= Shennong clan =

Chinese clan, c. 2600 BCE

Shennong 神農氏
- c. 2600 BCE–?
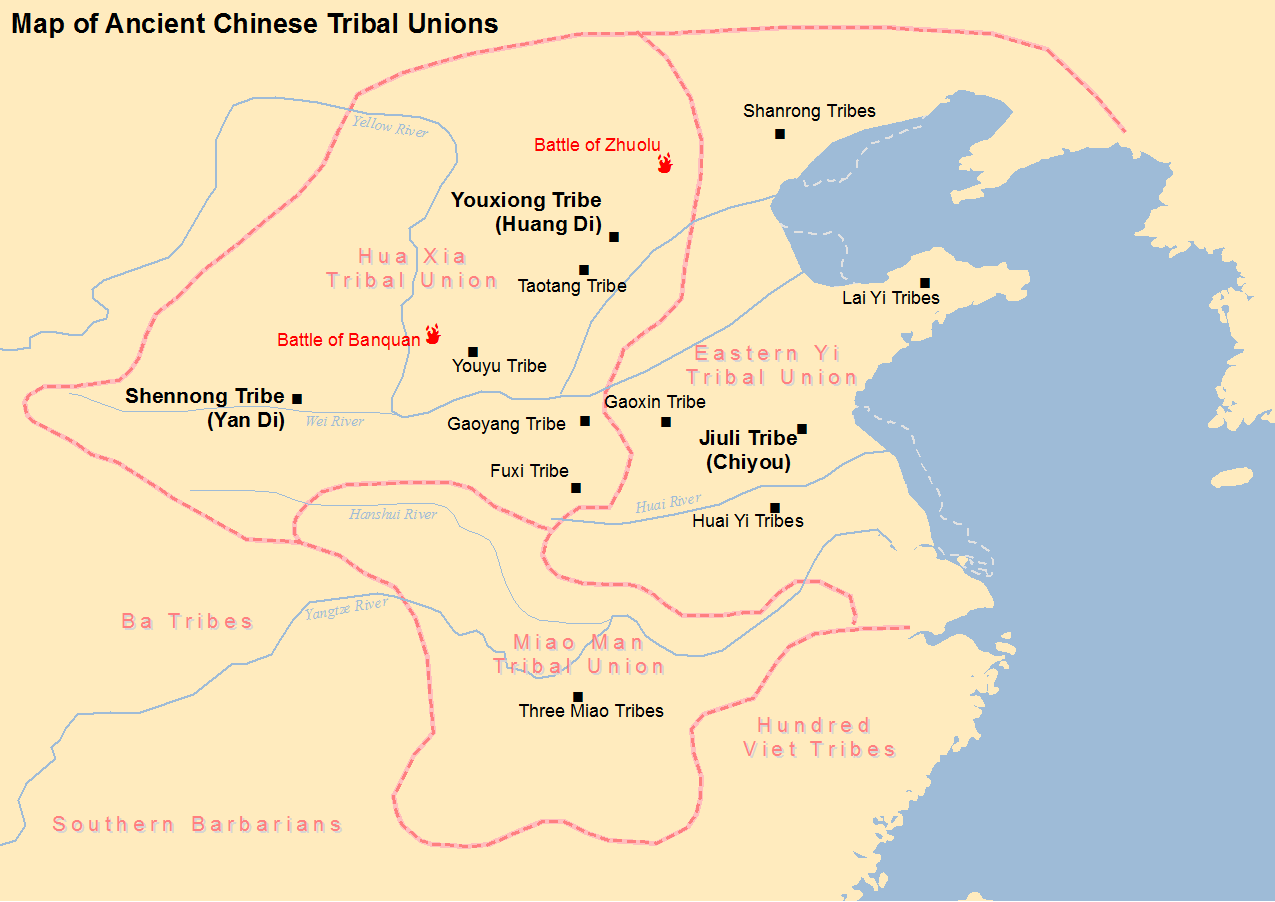
- Map of ancient tribal confederations during the Three Sovereigns and Five Emperors period.
- Common languages: Proto-Sinitic
- Government: Tribal confederation
- Yan Emperor
  - ?: Jiang Shinian
  - ?: Lin Kui (臨魁)
  - ?: Cheng (承)
  - ?: Ming (明)
  - ?: Zhi (直)
  - ?: Li (釐) or Ke (克) or Lai (來)
  - ?: Ai (哀)
  - ?: Yuwang
- Historical era: Three Sovereigns and Five Emperors
  - Established: c. 2600 BCE
  - Battle of Banquan: c. 2,600 BCE
  - Battle of Zhuolu: c. 2,600 BCE
  - Disestablished: ?
Preceded by
Fu Xi
Youqiao clan
Succeeded by
Yanhuang
Taotang clan
Youyu clan
- Today part of: Weibin District, Baoji

The Shennong clan was a legendary tribal confederation said to have existed during the Three Sovereigns and Five Emperors period of Chinese history. It is known for having the historical title of Flame Emperor and is credited with the creation of many traditional implements of Chinese culture.

== Name ==
"Shennong" literally translates to "spirit-farmer," and is thought to have been applied to Jiang Shinian, the clan's progenitor, because he was good at agriculture. The combination of Shennong and the Yan (Flame) Emperor is often thought to be influenced by the innovation of slash-and-burn agriculture, which dates back thousands of years.

== In traditional historiography ==
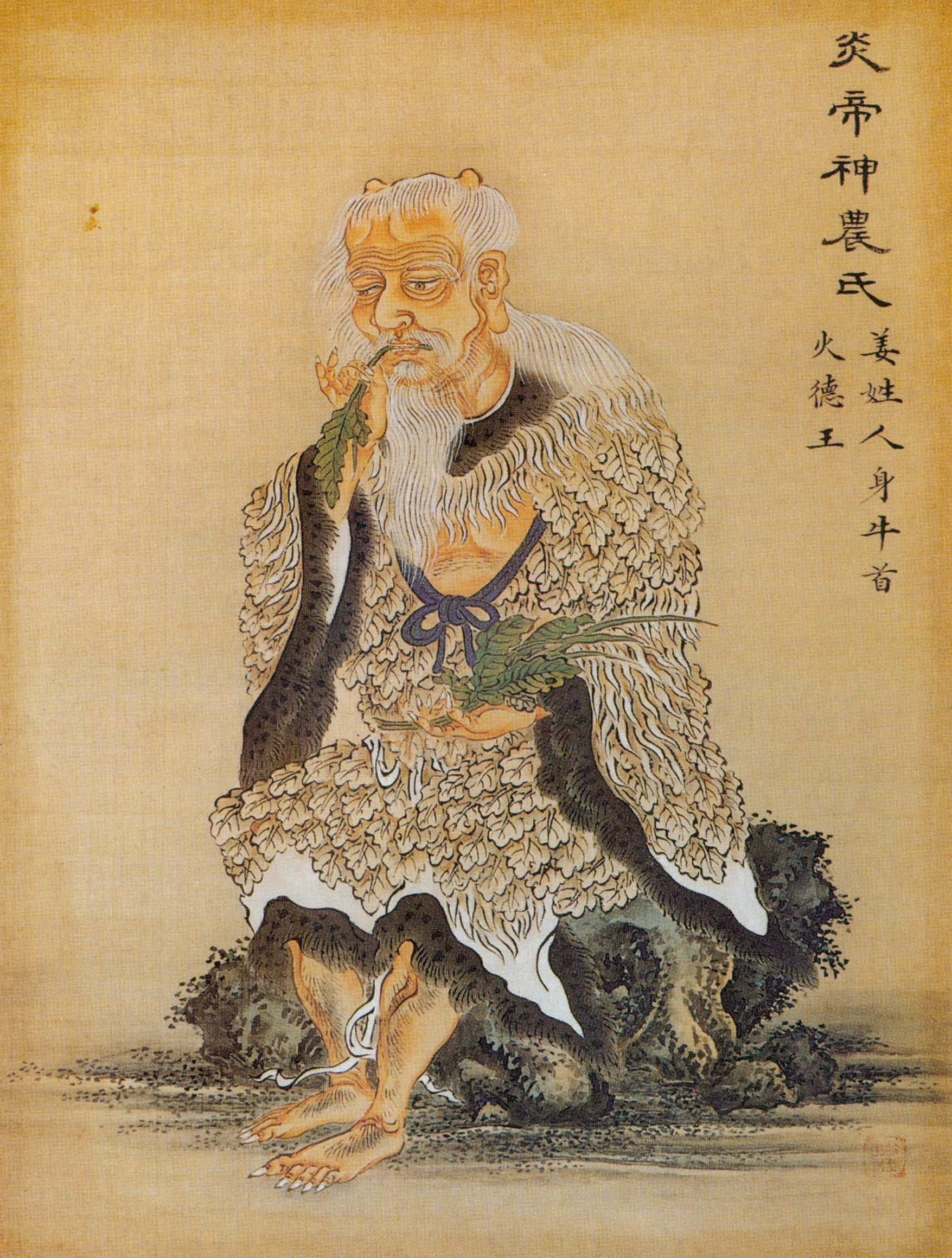
Jiang Shinian, Shennong, tasting plants to identify their traits. By Xu Jetian, c. 18th Century.

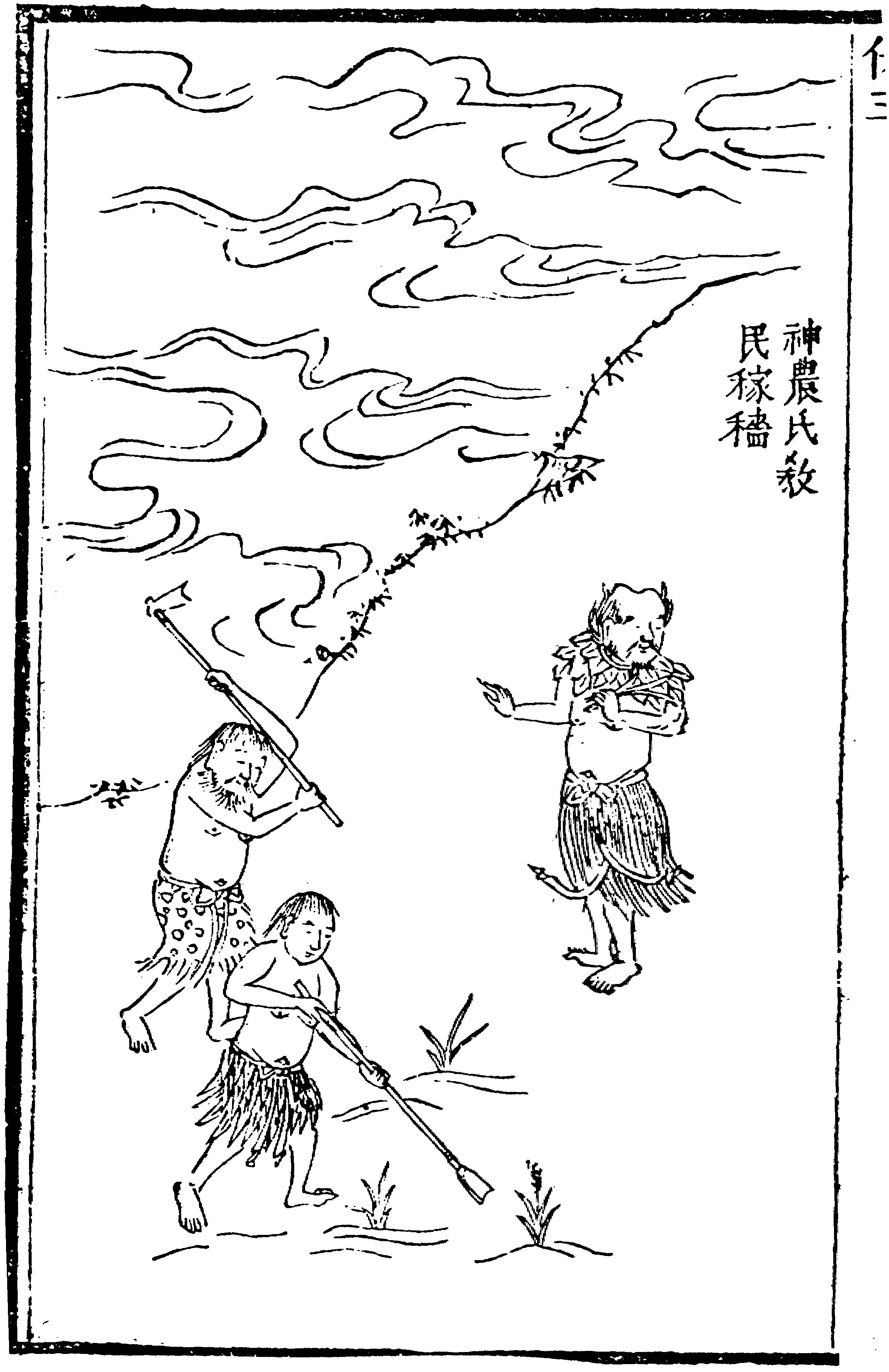
1736 illustration of the Shennong clan farming.

The Shennong clan coexisted with the Jiuli tribe and Youxiong clan, which were its rivals. It claimed descent from Shao Dian and the Youqiao clan (有蟜氏). Other texts, such as the Classic of Changes, state that the Shennong clan rose after the fall of the Fu Xi clan. Leaders of the Shennong clan were given the title of Yan Emperor, or "Flame Emperor," which would last for around 500 years. Guoyu records a Jin noble named Xu Chen (胥臣) speaking, where he describes the Shennong clan as having resided by the Jiang River; this would be taken as the surname for the Yan Emperors.

Shuo Yuan records a Susha clan (夙沙) attacking their own feudal lord to submit to the Shennong clan.

The Shennong clan is credited with the invention of numerous implements, particularly those related to farming; for example, the plow, hoe, wells, irrigation, and the makings of traditional Chinese medicine. Jiang Shinian, aka Shennong, the first Yan Emperor, is often depicted tasting herbs and plants to identify their properties. The preface to Xu Shen's Shuowen Jiezi mentions that the Shennong clan had invented the concept of tying knots as a precursor to Cangjie's mythical invention of the Han script, similar to quipu.

During the reign of Yuwang, the Shennong clan experienced a period of decline and infighting. This culminated in a war against the Youxiong clan at the Battle of Banquan. After three excursions, the Shennong clan eventually lost and capitulated to the Yellow Emperor, uniting under the Yanhuang clan. The united clan then went to war against Chi You's Jiuli tribe together, defeating them and securing dominance over the Chinese region. After the fall of the overall Shennong clan, the Classic of Changes states that the Taotang and Youyu clans rose alongside the Youxiong.

== Historicity ==
The story of the Shennong clan as told in the classics was considered historical for an extremely long time, until it was challenged by the Doubting Antiquity School. As there are no contemporary records of the Shennong clan, anyone who did live during this time cannot speak for themselves; all records that exist were written during the Warring States period of the Eastern Zhou or later. Therefore, there is no proof that the Shennong clan actually existed. Mark Edward Lewis states that Jiang Shinian, the first Flame Emperor, along with figures such as the Yellow Emperor, is generally seen by academics as a deity that was humanised over time.

=== Attempted identification ===
He Wandan (贺晚旦) and Yang Hongbao (杨红保) identify Yangtou Mountain (羊頭山) in Weibin District, Baoji as the historical territory of the Shennong clan.

== Legacy ==
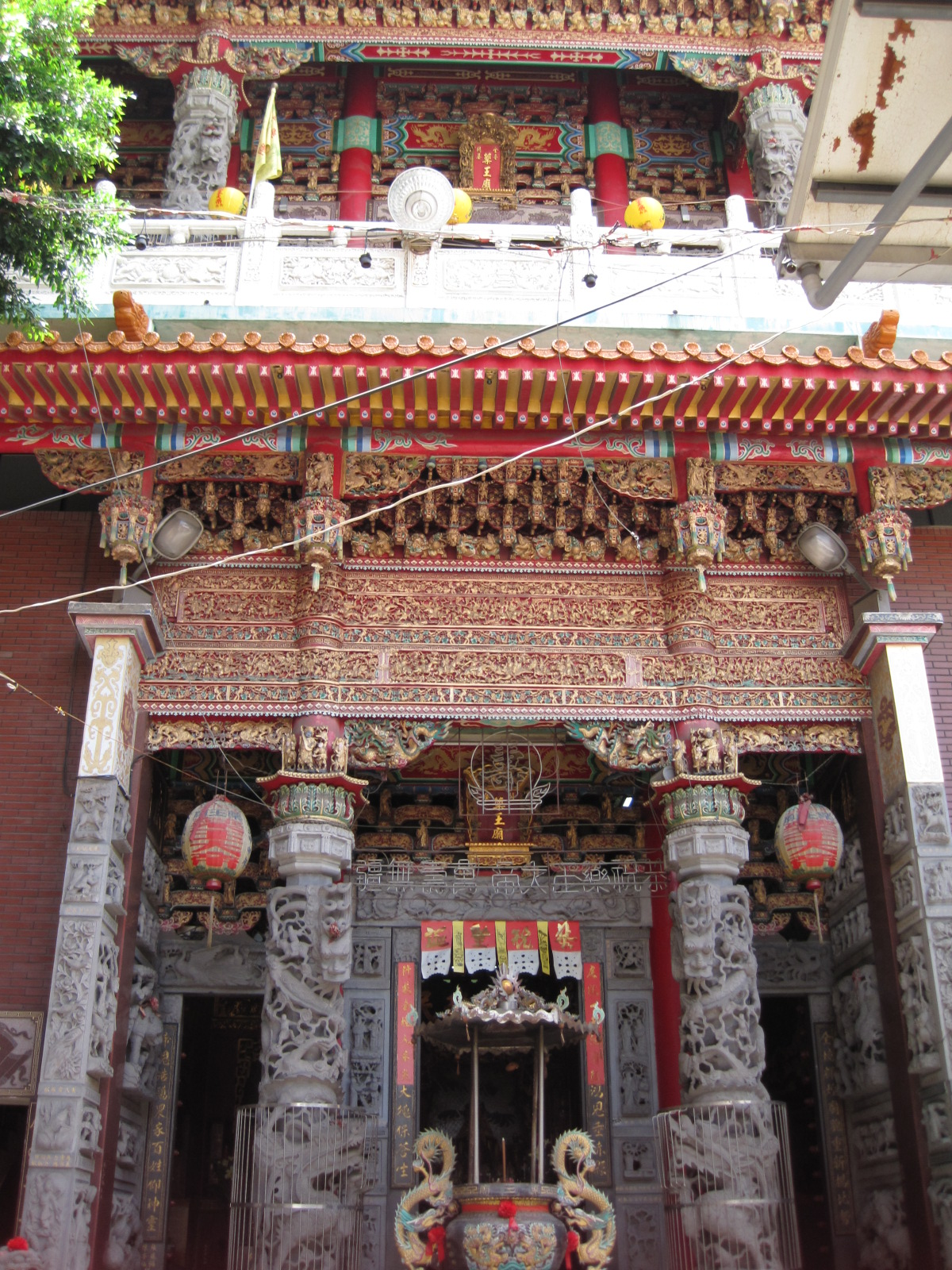
Temple of Shennong in Tainan, Taiwan.

After the decline of the Shennong clan, Cao Wei writer Huangfu Mi records that ministers of the clan maintained important ceremonial positions under rulers such as Zhuanxu, such as a minister of soil (土正). The unification of the Shennong and Youxiong tribes led to the saying Yanhuang Zizun (炎黃子孫), which refers to all Han Chinese descending from the Yan Emperor Yuwang and the Yellow Emperor.

Daoist texts tend to refer to the Shennong clan. For example, Zhuang Zhou, in his eponymous text, cites the Shennong clan as a broader philosophical point about how, despite living objectively worse lives, were still happy in their simple lives.

== Notable people ==
- Shennong
- Yuwang

== See also ==
- Chi You
- Gonggong
- Zhurong
