= Battle of Banquan =

Ancient battle in China

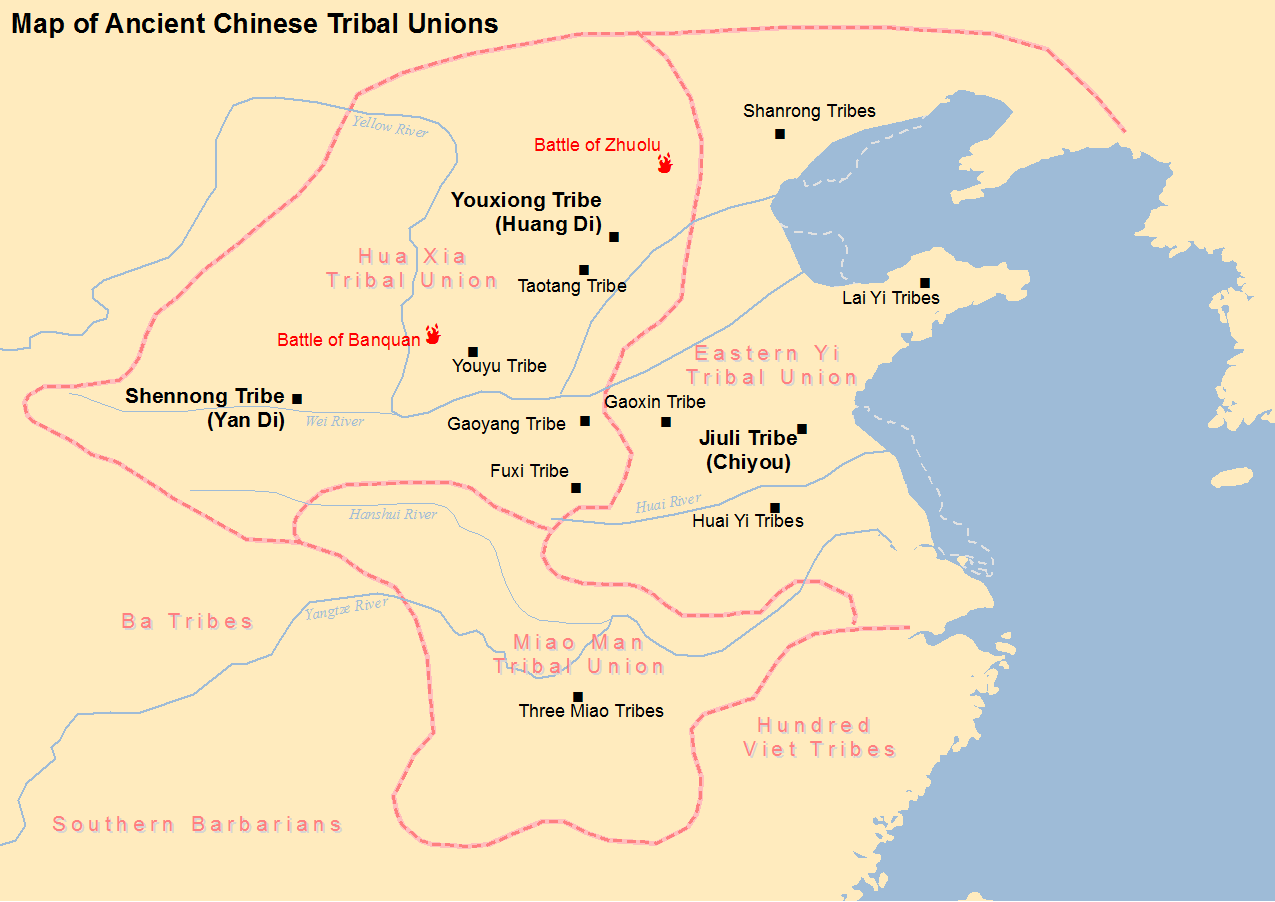
- Map showing a possible location of the battle and distribution of tribal unions at the time
Date	c. 2500 BC
Location	Banquan, China (disputed)
Result	Youxiong victory

Belligerents
Shennong clan	Youxiong clan

Commanders and leaders
Flame Emperor Yuwang	Yellow Emperor Huangdi

The Battle of Banquan (simplified Chinese: 阪泉之战; traditional Chinese: 阪泉之戰; pinyin: Bǎn Quán Zhī Zhàn) was a legendary battle in ancient Chinese history, said to have taken place c. 2500 BC. It was recorded by Sima Qian's Records of the Grand Historian. It was fought by Huangdi, the Yellow Emperor, and Yandi, the Flame Emperor.

== Background ==
The "Battle of Banquan" may actually only refer to the third of a series of three battles. The Yellow Emperor shortly afterwards fought Chiyou at the Battle of Zhuolu. Both battles were fought not long apart, and on nearby plains, and both involved the Yellow Emperor. Some scholars have concluded that they may have been the same battle. The Battle of Banquan is credited for the formation of the Yanhuang tribe, the precursor of the Huaxia civilization, which is the basis of the Chinese civilization.

Not much is known about this battle since it, along with other events of the era, is clouded by mythology. Thus, the historical accuracy of accounts of this battle is disputed. Chinese historiographical tradition places it in the 26th century BC.

The Shennong tribes originally were a branch of the late Neolithic agricultural people from the Guanzhong Plain in the west, who expanded across the Loess Plateau before eventually venturing east beyond the Taihang Mountains. Generations later, the tribe was in conflict with other expanding tribes at the time, such as the Jiuli tribes led by Chiyou, and the Youxiong tribes led by the Yellow Emperor. Yuwang, the last Flame Emperor first went to war with Chiyou but was defeated, and in retreating came to territorial conflict against the Yellow Emperor, who raised armies against Shennong.

The armies of Yellow Emperor, under the totems of the black bear (熊), brown bear (羆), pixiu (貔貅), (Note: Axel Schuessler (2007) states that in old texts 貔 pí referred to large panther-like cats; reconstructing 貔's Old Chinese pronunciation as *bi, Schuessler compares it to Tibetan: དབྱི།, Wylie: dbyi "lynx" and proposes a probable Sino-Tibetan etymology. According to Xu Ke (徐珂), the 貔 pi is male while the 貅 xiu is female.) and tigers (貙虎), (Note: According to Erya and Shuowen Jiezi, the 貙 chū looks like a 貍 lí; meanwhile, Guo Pu indicates that in his time the chū denotes a dog-sized tiger with markings like a lí. Guangyun defines the 貍 lí as a "wild cat"; sinologist and historian of medicine Paul U. Unschuld, identifies the 貍 lí as the leopard cat. Li Shizhen cites Records of the Commanderies and States (郡國志)'s description of the chu as "small tigers with five fingers".) met the armies of Shennong in Banquan in the first large-scale battle in Chinese history. After three major engagements, the Flame Emperor lost the battle and surrendered the leadership to the Yellow Emperor. The Youxiong and the Shennong tribes then made an alliance, forming the Yanhuang tribes, incorporating the small tribes around them.

The ever-expanding Yanhuang tribe soon drew the envy of Chiyou, who attacked Shennong's territories again. The Yanhuang tribe then reacted by facing Chiyou in the Battle of Zhuolu, and emerged victorious. The Yanhuang tribe could then expand eastwards without hindrance, and soon formed what came to be known as the Huaxia civilization, the precursor of the Han Chinese civilization. To this day, Chinese people still call themselves "the Descendants of Yan and Huang".

== Location of the battle ==
The actual location of Banquan, where this battle was fought, is in dispute. There are three likely locations:

1. Southeast of Zhuolu, Hebei
2. Banquan village of Yanqing District, Beijing
3. Xiezhou county, Yuncheng, Shanxi

Of these three, the third one is seen to be the most probable since the other two would imply that the two forces would both have to travel north to meet each other, which would be impractical.

Another possibility is that all three are correct, as both Confucius and Sima Qian appear to agree what took place was a series of three battles between Huangdi and Yandi (followed by the Battle of Zhuolu between Chiyou and an alliance of Huangdi, some princes and some lords on a nearby plain).

== Dissenting view ==
Historians Xia Zengyou (夏曾佑), Lü Simian (呂思勉), and Ding Shan (丁山) propose that the two different battles supposedly taking place at Banquan and Zhuolu were in fact just one same battle, and the Red/Flame Emperor was one same person as Chi You, who had usurped the title from Emperor Yuwang (帝榆罔).
