= Timeline of Chinese mythology =

The timeline of Chinese mythology starts with P'an-Ku and ends with Yu the Great, spanning from 36,000 years before the creation of the Earth to circa 2000 BC (time of Yu's rule, when he managed to overcome the Epic Flood). Some other myths were added outside this initial timespan, such as the myths from the Ba Xian, or the Eight Immortals (most of them are said to be born in the Tang or Song dynasty).

== Timeline ==
Date	Ruler	Events	Other people/events
36,000 yrs before Creation of the Earth	P'an-Ku	Chinese mythology
2852 BC	Fuxi	Chinese mythology
2737 BC	Yan Emperor	Chinese mythology
2698 BC	Yellow Emperor	Chinese mythology	The Battle of Banquan, the first battle in Chinese history and the Battle of Zhuolu, the second battle in Chinese history, fought by the Yellow Emperor.
2650 BC	Yellow Emperor	Chinese mythology	Legend of Cangjie, inventor of the Chinese character
2597 BC	Emperor Shaohao	Chinese mythology
2514 BC	Emperor Zhuanxu	Chinese mythology
2436 BC	Emperor Ku	Chinese mythology
2366 BC	Emperor Zhi	Chinese mythology
2358 BC	Emperor Yao	Chinese mythology	Yao ordered Gun to tame the flooding of the rivers.
2255 BC	Emperor Shun	Chinese mythology	Gun failed in taming the flood and was executed on Shun's orders.
2205 BC	Emperor Shun	Chinese mythology	Yu the Great conquers the flood (est.)
