= Yuanshi society =

Yuanshi society (原始社會) is a term to describe the early ancient tribal society around the time of the Three Sovereigns and Five Emperors era in ancient Chinese history and mythology. The term literally means "primitive society".

== Tribe chart ==
Below is a sample of some of the existing tribes at the time. Depending on the sources Chi You may fall within many tribe groups.

Tribe class	Main tribe ancestors
Yanhuang (炎黃)	According to traditions, they were descended from Yan emperor and Yellow emperor
Dongyi (東夷)	Related to mythological figures such as Chi You (蚩尤)
Miao (苗), Man (蠻)	Related to mythological figures such as Zhurong (祝融)
Baiyue (百越)	Wuyue (吳越), Nanyue (南越), Ouyue (甌越), Coyue (楚越)

== See also ==
- Chinese people
- Ethnic groups in Chinese history
- Ethnic minorities in China
- List of ethnic groups in China
- List of Neolithic cultures of China
