= Youxiong clan =

Chinese clan, c. 2600 BCE

Youxiong 有熊氏
- pre-c. 2698 BCE–?
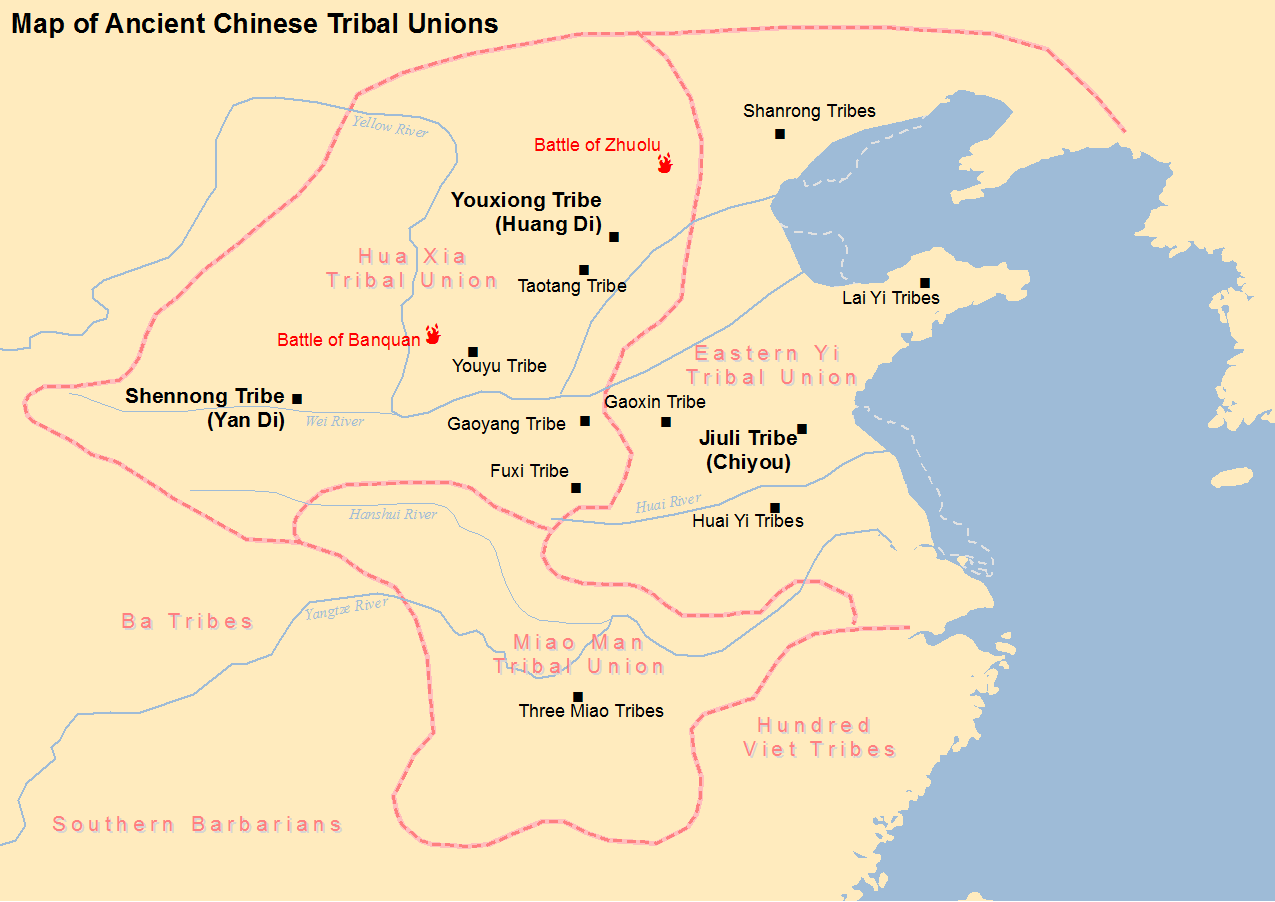
- Map of ancient tribal confederations during the Three Sovereigns and Five Emperors period.
- Capital: Zhuolu (涿鹿); Youxiong (有熊)
- Common languages: Proto-Sinitic
- Government: Tribal confederation
- Ruler
  - pre-c. 2698 BCE - c. 2698 BCE: Shaodian (disputed)
  - c. 2698 BCE - ?: Yellow Emperor
- Historical era: Three Sovereigns and Five Emperors
  - Established: pre-c. 2698 BCE
  - Battle of Banquan: c. 2,600 BCE
  - Battle of Zhuolu: c. 2,600 BCE
  - Disestablished: ?
Succeeded by
Yanhuang; Gaoyang clan
- Today part of: Xinzheng

The Youxiong clan (有熊氏), also known as the Xuanyuan (軒轅氏), Dihong (帝鴻氏), and/or Guizang clan (歸藏氏), is a legendary tribal confederation said to have existed during the Three Sovereigns and Five Emperors period of Chinese history.

== Names ==
The Youxiong clan is known by several names, all linked through different classics assigning the name to the Yellow Emperor. Tongzhi, written by Song dynasty scholar Zheng Qiao, lists four:

「黃帝軒轅氏，亦曰地皇，亦曰有熊氏，亦曰帝鴻氏，亦曰歸藏氏。或言有軒冕之服，故曰軒轅。作都於有熊，故曰有熊。」
The Yellow Emperor of the Xuanyuan clan is also known as Di Huang. He is also of the Youxiong clan and Guizang clan. Some say he wore crowns and robes, thus the name "Xuan". He established his capital in Youxiong, thus the name Youxiong.

Song dynasty scholar Luo Mi, in their text Lushi, believe that the name Xuanyuan refers to the clan having invented chariots. The name "Youxiong" is commonly cited as a part of a broader totemism theory, where bears were considered sacred to the ancient Sinitic peoples; the Chu people, for example, claimed descent from the Yellow Emperor and adopted the bear as their national symbol.

== In traditional historiography ==
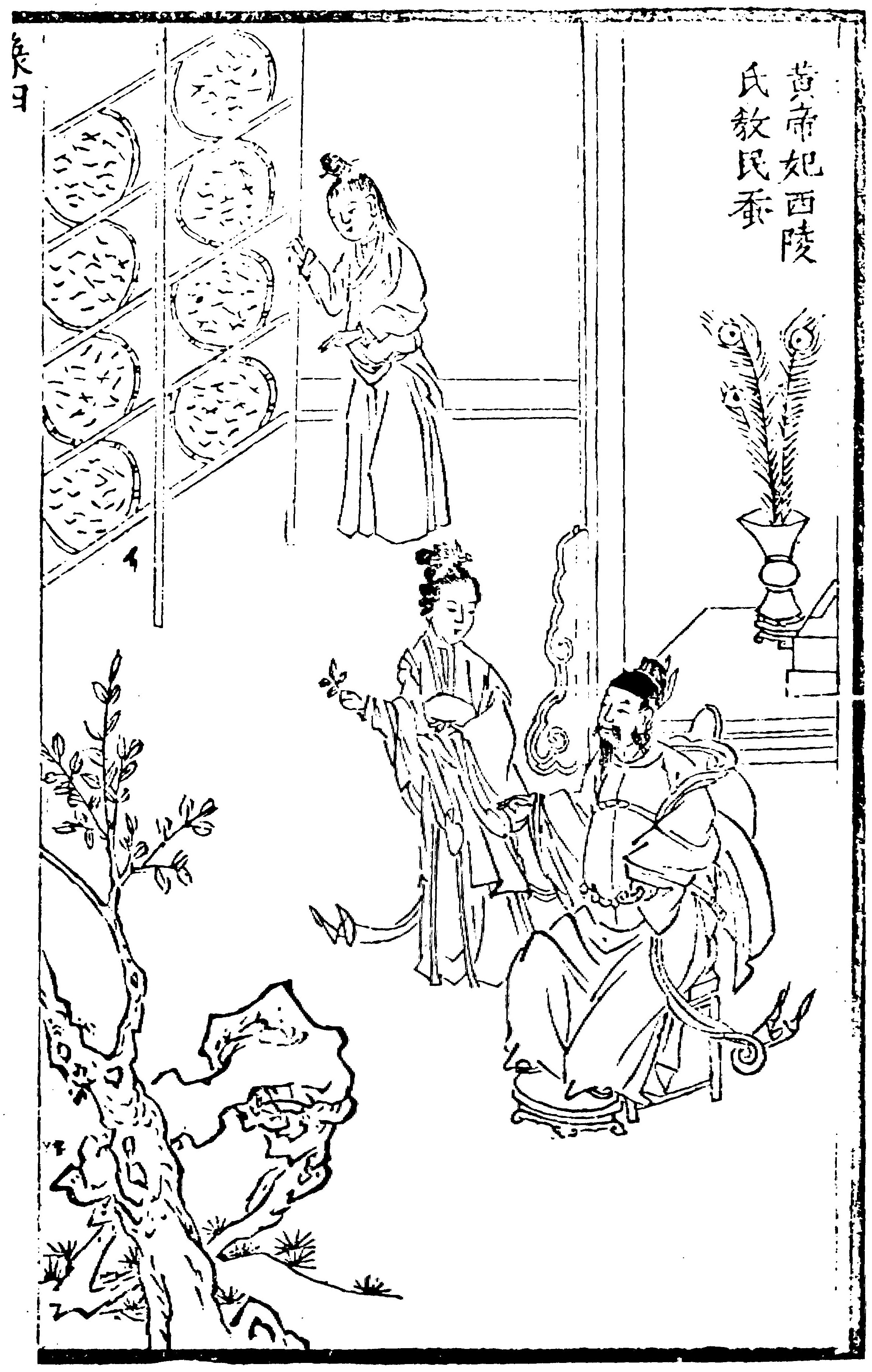
Leizu, the Yellow Emperor's wife, teaching sericulture (1736 illust.).

The Youxiong clan is said to have originated from either a person or clan named Shaodian. The idea of Shaodian being a clan and not a person started in the Tang dynasty with Sima Zhen's commentary. This was on the basis of a woman marrying a person from Shao Dian centuries later during the Qin dynasty. However, in the Qing dynasty, Cui Shu argued that this cannot be the case, as part of a broader argument about the Guoyu's discussion on the Flame and Yellow Emperor's ancestries; it would drive them centuries apart, when they were contemporaries. Despite this, Sima Zhen's argument generally holds.

The first capital of the Youxiong clan was in Zhuolu, which could be inherited from Shao Dian, which was once named Pengcheng. Upon taking power, the Yellow Emperor moved the capital to Youxiong, from which the Youxiong clan received its common name. The Bamboo Annals state that the Youxiong clan standardised court robes and implements, and officials were named after cloud patterns. A feng (鳳) arrived, which prompted a sacrifice at Luoshui. The Guanxiong (貫胸氏) and Changgu (長股氏) clans would arrive at the capital as guests. Eventually, during the 77th year of the Yellow Emperor, Changyi, his son, went to live by the Ruo River. Upon the hundredth year, an earthquake happened, and the Yellow Emperor died.

Traditional Chinese historiography assigns the creation of the Han script to the Youxiong clan through Cangjie, who served as a historian and scribe for the Yellow Emperor. Received texts state that Cangjie was ordered to invent a writing system by the Yellow Emperor, who would then use the tracks of birds and turtle plastrons, as well as Fuxi's bagua, as a reference point for the first writing system.

The Youxiong clan frequently went to war against the rival Jiuli tribe led by Chi You, as well as the Shennong clan led by the Flame Emperor. Sima Qian records the Youxiong taming various mammals to assist them in their wars, which resulted in victories such as those at the Battle of Banquan and Battle of Zhuolu. This involved warring against other tribes, such as those led by Kuafu. Liu Yuqing argues that the presence of Nüba, who is otherwise said to be the Yellow Emperor's daughter and a drought deity, during these wars, is a sign that there could have been a major natural drought during these periods; received folkloric accounts in Henan back this claim.

Upon the death of the Yellow Emperor, Zhuanxu would take power and found the Gaoyang clan.

== Historicity ==
Beginning with the Doubting Antiquity School, the historicity of the Three Sovereigns and Five Emperors period began facing heavy scrutiny. This was worsened come the unearthing of oracle bones, which fail to mention the Youxiong clan at all; therefore, much of the pre-Qin history as taught by figures such as Sima Qian is considered to be mythic history. The earliest mentions of the Youxiong clan come from Warring States period literature. Mark Edward Lewis states that most scholars of myth today believe that the Yellow Emperor was once a deity who became humanised over time.

=== Attempted identification ===
Xu Shunzhan (许顺湛), director of the Henan Museum, stated in 2017 that the Tanghu site in Xinzheng is highly likely to be the original capital of the Youxiong clan, based on classical texts dating back to the Song dynasty that identified the city as a historical location for the Youxiong clan, such as Tongzhi. Xin Yingjun (信应君) and Hu Yayi (胡亚毅) have further attempted to link the Youxiong clan to this site, and the Xinzheng Local Government cites this in its attempts to protect the site.

== Legacy ==
Numerous Chinese surnames have legends that trace themselves back to the Youxiong clan. The unification of the Shennong and Youxiong tribes led to the saying Yanhuang Zizun (炎黃子孫), which refers to all Han Chinese descending from the Yan Emperor Yuwang and the Yellow Emperor.

== Notable people ==
- Yellow Emperor - Inventor of various customs.
- Shaohao - Brother of the Yellow Emperor.
- Nüba - Drought deity and warrior woman.
- Changyi - Father of Zhuanxu.
- Cangjie - Inventor of writing.
