= Zhuolu =

Zhuolu may refer to:

- Zhuolu County, in Hebei, China
- Zhuolu Town, seat of Zhuolu County
- Site of the Battle of Zhuolu, in the 26th century BC between the Yellow Emperor and Chi You
