= Yuwang =

- Yan Emperor of the Shennong clan

Yan Emperor
- Predecessor: Ai
- Successor: title abolished
- Born: Jiang Yuwang
- Clan: Shennong
- Father: Ke
- Military career
- Allegiance: Shennong clan Yanhuang clan
- Conflicts: Battle of Banquan; Battle of Zhuolu

Emperor Yuwang (帝榆罔), surname Jiang (姜), was the eighth and the last legendary Yan Emperor and ruler of the Shennong clan during the era of the Three Sovereigns and Five Emperors.

== History ==
According to the Records of Emperors and Kings by Huangfu Mi, he was the last Yan Emperor of the Shennong clan. Born in Chengliu (承留) (present day southeast of Kaifeng County, Kaifeng, Henan Province) as the son of Jiang Ke (姜克), the sixth or seventh Yan Emperor. Their capital was at Yichuan (present day south of Luoyang, Henan).

According to the Records of the Grand Historian by Sima Zhen, Di Yuwang, the last Yan Emperor and his tribe engaged in the battle with the invading Chi You's Jiuli tribe and were defeated. They retreated from that recent invasion and came into territorial conflict with its neighbouring Youxiong tribes led by the Yellow Emperor.

The Youxiong tribe engaged the Shennong tribe in a large-scale Battle of Banquan in Chinese history. After three major engagements, the Yan Emperor lost the battle and surrendered to the Yellow Emperor. He agreed to merge his tribe with the Yellow Emperor's to form a new confederation, the Yanhuang tribe.

The Yellow Emperor and Yuwang the former Yan Emperor then led the newly merged Yanhuang tribe to war with Chiyou and his tribe in the Battle of Zhuolu and defeated them, thus establishing their cultural and political dominance in China proper.

Therefore, the Yan Emperor, together with the Yellow Emperor and Chi You, are collectively known as the "Three Patriarchs of China".

== Legacy ==
Cao Wei writer Huangfu Mi records that ministers of the Shennong clan maintained important ceremonial positions under rulers such as Zhuanxu, such as a minister of soil (土正). The unification of the Youxiong and Shennong clans resulted in the saying Yan Huang Zisun (炎黃子孫), which refers to all Han Chinese descending from the Yan Emperor Yuwang and the Yellow Emperor.
