= Xu Ke =

Xu Ke may refer to:

- Xu Ke (author) (1869–1928), Chinese author
- Tsui Hark (born 1950), pinyin Xu Ke, Hong Kong film director
