= Jiang River =

Historic river in China

The Jiang River (Chinese: 姜水, p Jiāng Shuǐ) is the ancient name of a river in China.

According to Sima Qian's Records of the Grand Historian, the river gave its name to Shennong's family.

According to the Guoyu, it was the birthplace of the Yan emperor.

It may be identical to the modern Wei River in Shaanxi.
