= Yao Grass =

Yao Grass (Chinese: 瑶草) is a type of mythical plant which appears in Chinese mythology, of which there were two types. It is one of various mythical plants encountered in Chinese myths. Two types of Yao Grass are attested to in the Shanhaijing.

== Guyao Mountain Yao Grass ==
One type grew on Guyao Mountain: this type of Yao Grass acted as a type of love potion, which would cause a person who ate it attract the love of others. This type was described as having lush leaves, yellow flowers and fruit like dodder. It originated as a transformation of Yan Di's daughter Yaoji after her death.

== Taishi Mountain Yao Grass ==
Another type of Yao Grass grew at Taishi Mountain: this type when used produced an effect of mental clarity, preventing confusion of the mind. This type was similar to the Atractylodes, with white flowers and black fruits.

== See also ==
- Chinese mythology
