= Nüba =

Drought Demon Goddess and Daughter of Yellow Emperor

Nüba (Chinese: 女魃; pinyin: nǚbá), also known as Ba (魃) and as Hanba (旱魃), is a Chinese drought deity. "Ba" is her proper name, with the nü being an added indication of being feminine and han meaning "drought".

== Legend ==
Ba is the daughter of the Yellow Emperor (Huangdi) whom she aided during his Battle at Zhuolu against Chiyou. After Chiyou had fielded a wind god (Feng Bo) and a rain god (Yu Shi), Ba descended from heaven to use her drought power to defeat their wind and rain powers. She is one of the first goddesses attested to in Chinese literature, appearing in the early collection of poetry, the Shijing, as well as in the later Shanhaijing. Nüba can be considered to be an ancient Chinese mythical drought demon. After having descended from Heaven to aid Huangdi at Zhuolu, instead of returning to heaven, Ba wandered to the northern parts of the earth. Wherever Ba appeared, there would be a drought. In the Book of the Later Han, Yinglong was connected as a companion to Nüba in the myth. They fought simultaneously against Chiyou's forces. This relationship led to the mythological romance of Nüba and Yinglong in later centuries. She is one of the four ancestors of the jiangshi. She became a jiangshi by one part of Denglong's soul entering her body.

== Appearance ==
Ba is described in the Shanhaijing as dressed in dark clothes. In the Shenyijing of the Han dynasty or Six Dynasties times, she is described as being about two to three chis in height, but otherwise looking like a person, who walked naked as fast as the wind.

== Rain ceremonies ==
Up through the middle of the twentieth century, ceremonies to produce rain were held in many regions of China. The basic idea of these ceremonies, which could last several hours, was to drive Ba out of the region. Once Ba was chased away, then the drought was thought to depart along with her and rain would then be sure to soon commence.

== See also ==
- Chinese folk religion
- Chinese mythology
- Religion in China
- Hiderigami, her Japanese counterpart
- Jiangshi
- Denglong (mythology)
