= Battle of Zhuolu =

Ancient battle in China

Date	c. 2500 BC
Location	Zhuolu, Hebei
Result	Decisive Yanhuang victory: Initiation of the Huaxia civilization; Exile and subjugation of the Jiuli tribes

Belligerents
Yanhuang tribe	Jiuli Kingdom

Commanders and leaders
Yellow Emperor; Flame Emperor Yuwang	Chiyou †

Strength
8,000–15,000	72–81 tribes, roughly estimated around 15,000–26,000

Casualties and losses
c. 1,200–3,000	Nearly entire invading force; 3,000 in the initial battle, 7,000+ in the retreat

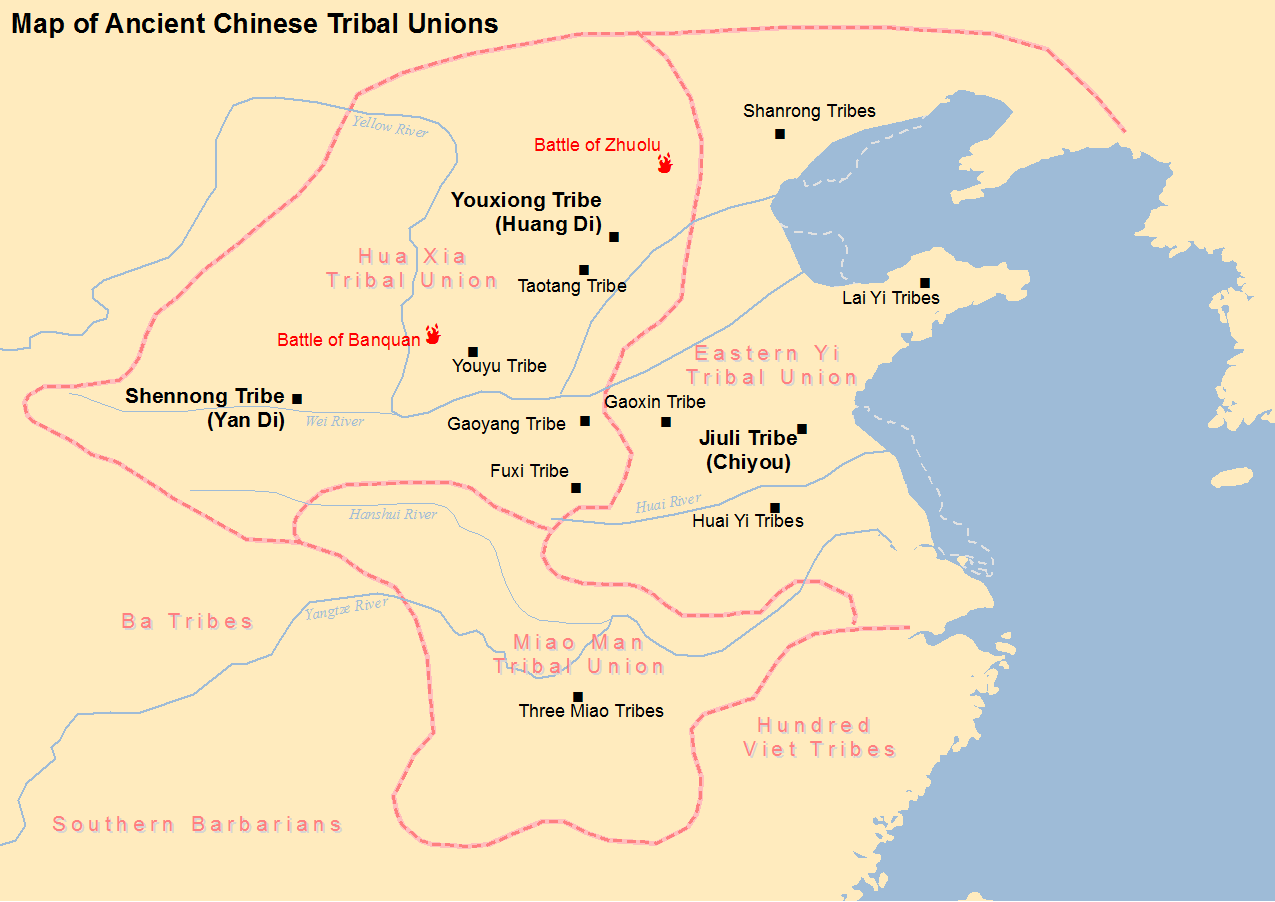
Map of tribes and tribal unions in Ancient China, including tribes of Huang Di (Yellow Emperor), Yan Di (Flame Emperor) and Chiyou. The location of Battle of Zhuolu is also shown.

The Battle of Zhuolu (simplified Chinese: 涿鹿之战; traditional Chinese: 涿鹿之戰) was a legendary battle in ancient Chinese history, said to have taken place c. 2500 BC. It was the second battle in the history of China as recorded in the Records of the Grand Historian, fought between the Yanhuang tribes led by the legendary Yellow Emperor and the Jiuli tribes led by Chiyou. The battle was fought in Zhuolu, near the present-day border of Hebei and Shanxi.

The victory for the Yellow Emperor here is often credited as history, although almost everything from that time period is considered legendary. Traditional Chinese historiography places the battle in the 26th century BC, although the Xia–Shang–Zhou Chronology Project has suggested the traditional dates to be at least some two centuries too early for the most remote recorded periods.

== Background ==
In prehistoric China, the Youxiong tribe of Yellow Emperor rose to power on the plains of Guanzhong and merged with Yan Emperor's Shennong tribe following the Battle of Banquan. The Yanhuang tribes, as the merged tribes were known, spread along the Yellow River towards the East China Sea. The Jiuli (Chinese: 九黎, "the nine Lis") tribes, led by Chiyou, had developed near the present-day borders of Shandong, Hebei, and Henan, and expanded towards the west. The Yanhuang and Jiuli tribes were in conflict over the fertile land in the Yellow River valley, and thus they fought in the plains of Zhuolu. Chiyou's tribes were fierce in war and skilled at making weapons; allying themselves with the Kua Fu tribe and the Sanmiao (Chinese: 三苗, "the three Miaos") tribe, they first attacked the Yan Emperor's tribe, driving them into the lands of the Yellow Emperor. The Yellow Emperor was angered by this, and went to war with Chiyou.

== Battle ==
The details of the battle are mostly seen as mythical by historians, but if such a battle did occur, these are the events said to have happened:

It was said that Chiyou led 72 to 81 tribes against the Yanhuang tribes in a thick fog. The Yellow Emperor sent tribes under the totems of the black bear (熊), brown bear (羆), pixiu (貔貅), (Note: Axel Schuessler (2007) states that in old texts 貔; pí referred to large panther-like cats; reconstructing 貔's Old Chinese pronunciation as *bi, Schuessler compares it to Tibetan: དབྱི།, Wylie: dbyi "lynx" and proposes a probable Sino-Tibetan etymology. According to Xu Ke (徐珂), the 貔; pi is male while the 貅; xiu is female.) and tigers (貙虎), (Note: According to Erya and Shuowen Jiezi, the 貙; chū looks like a 貍; lí; meanwhile, Guo Pu indicates that in his time the chū denotes a dog-sized tiger with markings like a lí. Guangyun defines the 貍; lí as a "wild cat"; sinologist and historian of medicine Paul U. Unschuld, identifies the 貍; lí as the leopard cat. Li Shizhen cites Records of the Commanderies and States (郡國志)'s description of the chu as "small tigers with five fingers".) in retaliation; but due to the fog, they initially suffered several defeats. To counter the fog, the Yellow Emperor brought forth the south-pointing chariot, a geared mechanism able to point in one constant direction designed by himself and built for him by the craftsman Fang Bo. In addition, the Xuannü (玄女) tribe helped the Yanhuang forces by blowing horns and hitting drums, thus frightening the enemy. The Yanhuang forces were ultimately victorious, killing Chiyou in Hebei.

== Aftermath ==
After the battle, the Yellow Emperor built his capital in Zhuolu, and established the agricultural confederacy that later came to be known as the Huaxia civilization, which would evolve into the Han Chinese nation. The Yellow Emperor and the Yan Emperor were often credited for allowing the Chinese civilization to thrive due to the battle, and many Chinese people call themselves "descendants of Yan and Huang" (炎黃子孫) to this day. Because of his ferocity in battle, Chiyou was also worshiped as a war deity in ancient China. According to the Records of the Grand Historian, Qin Shi Huang worshipped Chiyou as the God of War, and Liu Bang worshiped at Chiyou's shrine before his decisive battle against Xiang Yu. In modern China, the Hall of the Three Grand Ancestors built in Xinzheng is dedicated to Huangdi, Yandi and Chiyou who are collectively revered as the founding ancestors of the Chinese nation.

The Jiuli tribes that didn't submit to the rule of Yellow Emperor, however, were chased out of the central region of China, and split into two smaller splinter groups, the Miao (苗) and the Li (黎). The Miao moved southwest and the Li moved southeast, as the victorious Huaxia race expanded southwards. During the course of Chinese history, the Miao and the Li were regarded as "barbarians" by the increasingly technologically and culturally advanced Han Chinese. Some fragments of these groups were assimilated into the Chinese during the Zhou Dynasty.

Yet, in other versions of the post-Jiuli migration, the people of Jiuli fragmented in 3 different directions. It is said Chiyou had 3 sons, and after the fall of Jiuli, his eldest son led some people south, his middle son led some people north, and his youngest son remained in Zhuolu and was assimilated into the Huaxia culture. Those who were led to the south established the Sanmiao nation. Perhaps on account of this splitting into multiple groups, many Far Eastern peoples regard Chiyou as their ancestor, and by the same token, many question the ethnicity of Chiyou as exclusively Hmong or otherwise. Some Koreans who believe Hwandan Gogi as an authentic text claim Chiyou is an ancestor of Koreans, however, popular mainstream studies of Korea believe that Chiyou has no connection to Koreans.

== Mythology ==
According to the Chinese mythological account Classic of Mountains and Seas, Chiyou, with the giants, Jiuli tribes and evil spirits, rebelled against the Yellow Emperor at Zhuolu plains. Both sides used magical powers, but Chiyou had the advantage of forged swords and halberds. Using his powers, Chiyou covered the battlefield in thick fog. Only with the help of a magical compass chariot could the Yellow Emperor's troops find their way through the mist. He also used his daughter, Nüba, the Drought Daemon, to counter Chiyou's tactics and harm Chiyou's troops. Later on, Chiyou suffered more defeats and was captured; he was either slain by Yinglong (應龍, lit. "Responsive Dragon") or Nüba, who could not return to heaven.

== Dissenting view ==
Historians Xia Zengyou (夏曾佑), Lü Simian (呂思勉), and Ding Shan (丁山) propose that the two different battles supposedly taking place at Banquan and Zhuolu were in fact just one same battle, and the Red/Flame Emperor (赤帝/炎帝) was one same person as Chi You, who had usurped the title from Emperor Yuwang (帝榆罔).
