= Yanhuang =

Mythical ethnic group of ancient China

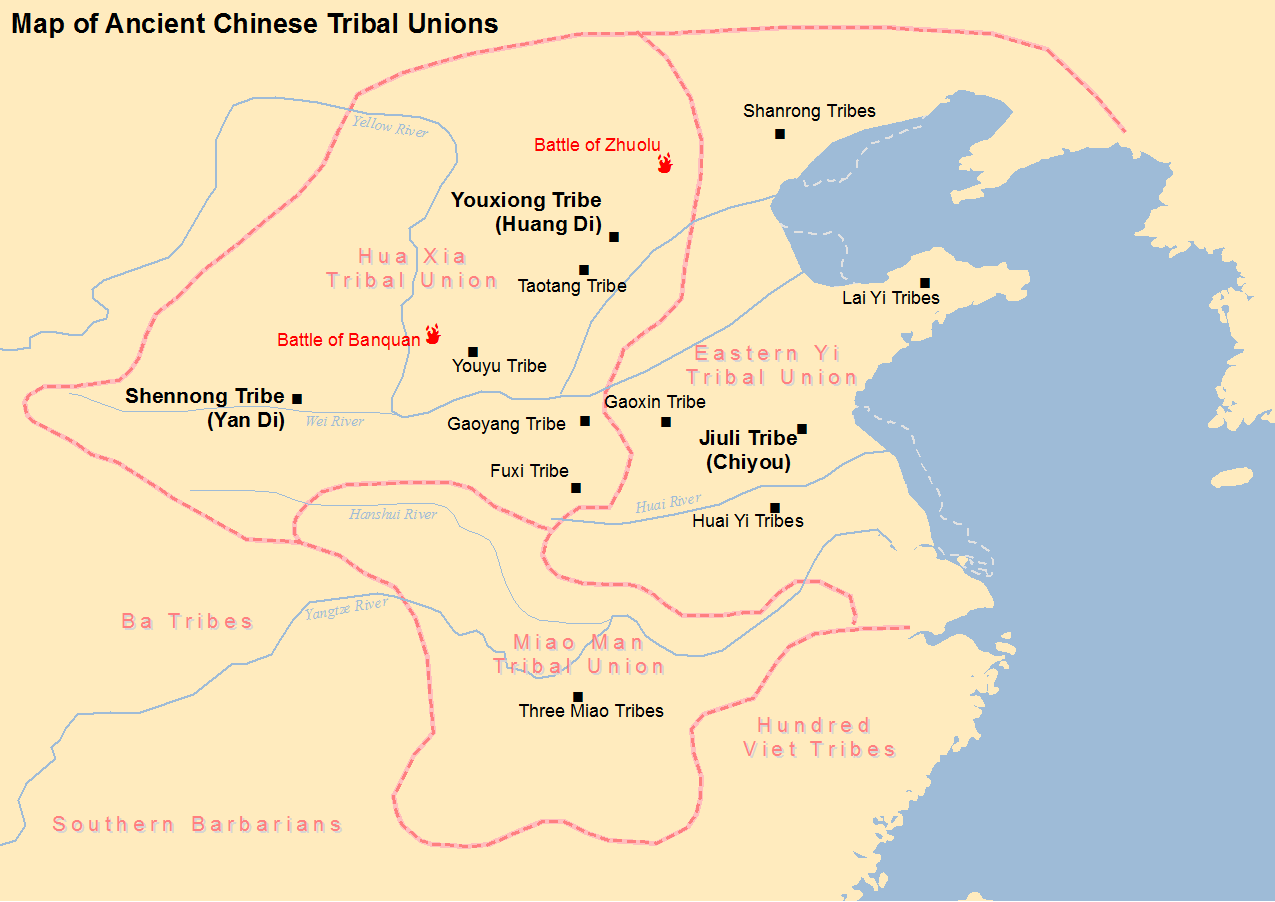
Map of tribes and tribal unions in Ancient China. Yanhuang is shown as Hua Xia Tribal Union in the map.

Yanhuang or Yan Huang (simplified Chinese: 炎黄; traditional Chinese: 炎黃; pinyin: Yán Huáng) was the name of a legendary East Asian ethnic group who were said to have inhabited the middle Yellow River basin in ancient China. The name comes from their alleged descent from two early Bronze Age agrarian tribal confederacies led by the Flame Emperor (Yandi) and Yellow Emperor (Huangdi), whose allied victory over the eastern Jiuli tribes led by the Chiyou at the mythical Battle of Zhuolu has been considered as the foundation for the Chinese civilization and the cultural identity of the Chinese people.

Shaodian's wife Youjiao gave birth to the Yellow Emperor near the Ji River and the Yan Emperor next to the Jiang River which accounted for their different temperaments. Although Shaodian preceded the Yellow and Yan emperors, he was not their father.

During the time of Huangdi, Shennong's descendants declined. Hong Sheng and the Yan emperor were descended from Shennong. They both possessed comprehensive knowledge. Five hundred years elapsed from Shennong to the time of the Yellow and Yan emperors. The Yan emperor was the last generation; Shennong, Shaodian, the Flame [Yan] Emperors, and Huangdi all preceded him.

The Yanhuang tribes subsequently expanded in territories and cultural dominance and evolved into the Huaxia people during the Xia, Shang and Zhou dynasties. To this day, the Chinese people, particularly the majority Han Chinese, still refer to themselves with the term Yan Huang Zisun (meaning "descendants of Yan and Huang").

== See also ==
- Huaxia
- Yan Huang Zisun, literally "descendants of Yan and Yellow Emperor"
- Emperors Yan and Huang (monument)
- Battle of Banquan
- Battle of Zhuolu
