= Zhuolu Town =

Zhuolu 涿鹿
- Town
- 涿鹿镇
- Location within China
- Coordinates: 40°22′31″N 115°12′54″E
- Country: China
- Province: Hebei
- Prefecture-level city: Zhangjiakou
- County: Zhuolu County

Area
  - Total: 77.21 km^{2} (29.81 sq mi)
- Elevation: 528 m (1,732 ft)

Population (2010)
  - Total: 72,538
  - Density: 939.5/km^{2} (2,433/sq mi)
- Time zone: UTC+8 (China Standard)

Zhuolu (Chinese: 涿鹿; pinyin: Zhuōlù; Wade–Giles: Chuo-lu) is a town and the county seat of Zhuolu County, northwestern Hebei province, Northern China. It has an area of 77.21 square kilometres (29.81 sq mi) and a population of 72,538 as of 2010, and is made up of six communities and 30 villages. It is located 52 kilometres (32 mi) southeast of Zhangjiakou.

== Historical uncertainty ==
Modern Zhuolu may or may not have been the location of the historical Battle of Zhuolu. However, it is promoted for tourism as such. Modern Zhuolu may or may not have been the location of what is claimed to be a city founded by the legendary Yellow Emperor, Huáng dì (黄帝), although there is evidence to support this case. According to tradition, Zhuolu was a city that the Yellow Emperor, Huáng dì, founded. Zhuolu Town, is also considered by many to be a legendary birthplace of the Miao and has a statue of Chi You commemorating him as the ancestor of the Hmong.
