= Weibin District, Baoji =

Coordinates: 34°17′07″N 107°05′16″E

Weibin 渭滨区
- District
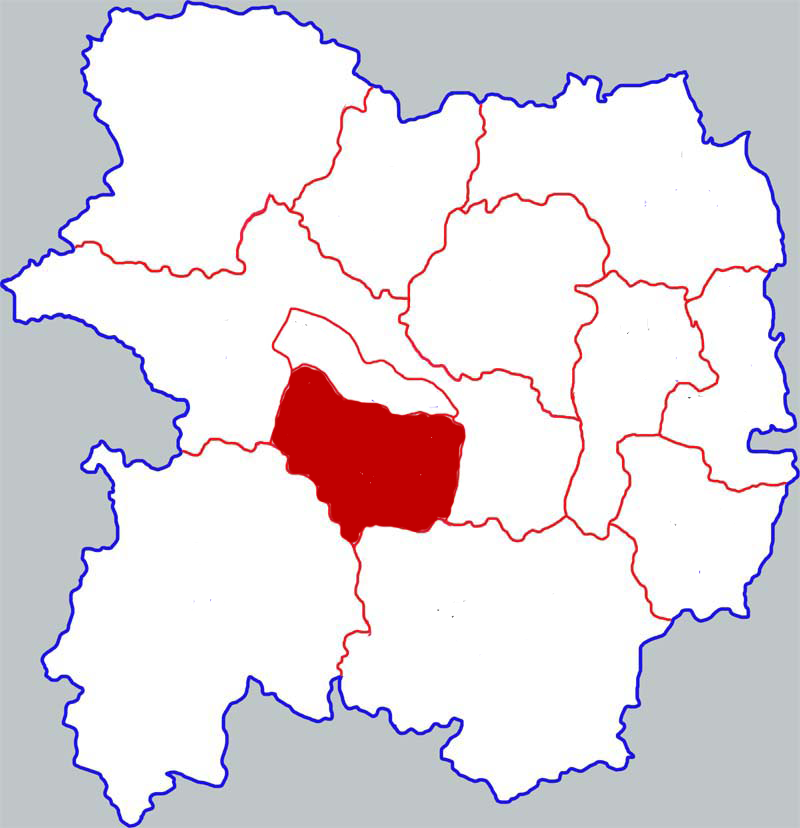
- Country: China
- Province: Shaanxi
- Prefecture-level city: Baoji

Area
  - Total: 728 km^{2} (281 sq mi)

Population (2019)
  - Total: 426,366
  - Density: 586/km^{2} (1,520/sq mi)
- Time zone: UTC+8 (China standard time)
- Postal code: 721000
- Licence plates: 陕C

Weibin District (simplified Chinese: 渭滨区; traditional Chinese: 渭濱區; pinyin: Wèibīn Qū) is a district of Baoji, Shaanxi, China.

== Administrative divisions ==
As of 2020, this district is divided to 5 subdistricts and 5 towns.

Subdistricts

- Weidihling Subdistrict (金陵街道)
- Jing'erlu Subdistrict (经二路街道)
- Qingjiang Subdistrict (清姜街道)
- Jiangtan Subdistrict (姜谭街道)
- Qiaonan Subdistrict (桥南街道)

Towns

- Maying (马营镇)
- Shigu (石鼓镇)
- Shennong (神农镇)
- Gaojia (高家镇)
- Bayu (八鱼镇)
