= Xia Zengyou =

Chinese historian

- Chinese: 夏曾佑
Transcriptions
Standard Mandarin
- Hanyu Pinyin: Xià Zéngyòu
- Wade–Giles: Hsia4 Tseng2-yu4

Bieshi
- Traditional Chinese: 別士
- Simplified Chinese: 别士
Transcriptions
Standard Mandarin
- Hanyu Pinyin: Biéshì
- Wade–Giles: Pieh2-shih4

Xia Zengyou (Chinese: 夏曾佑; 1863–1924) was a Chinese Buddhist scholar, historian and poet active in the late Qing dynasty who published a general history of China in 1904, titled Zhongguo lishi jiaokeshu (中国历史教科书; literally "Chinese History: A Textbook"). He believed that his contemporaries had much to learn from history, writing in the preface of his textbook that "there is no greater wisdom than ... (drawing) inferences from past events". Commissioned by Commercial Press, the textbook was well-received for the rest of Xia's life and was reprinted in 1933. Described as an "important intermediary between the Buddhist milieu and the intellectuals" during his time, Xia is credited with introducing Buddhist literature to reformist official Sun Baoxuan as well as yogachara to philosopher Zhang Binglin. Xia was friends with Liang Qichao and Yan Fu, with whom he co-edited a couple of newsletters. He also occasionally wrote under the pseudonym of Bieshi.
