= Xu Ke (author) =

Chinese author

Xu Ke (Chinese: 徐珂; pinyin: Xú Kē; 1869–1928) was a Chinese writer. He wrote an "unofficial" history of the Qing dynasty, Qing Bai Lei Chao, published in 48 volumes in 1917. Author and UC Irvine professor Yong Chen said the book "provides an encyclopedic coverage of life during the Qing dynasty."
