= Shennong =

Legendary Chinese ancestral deity

Shennong 神農
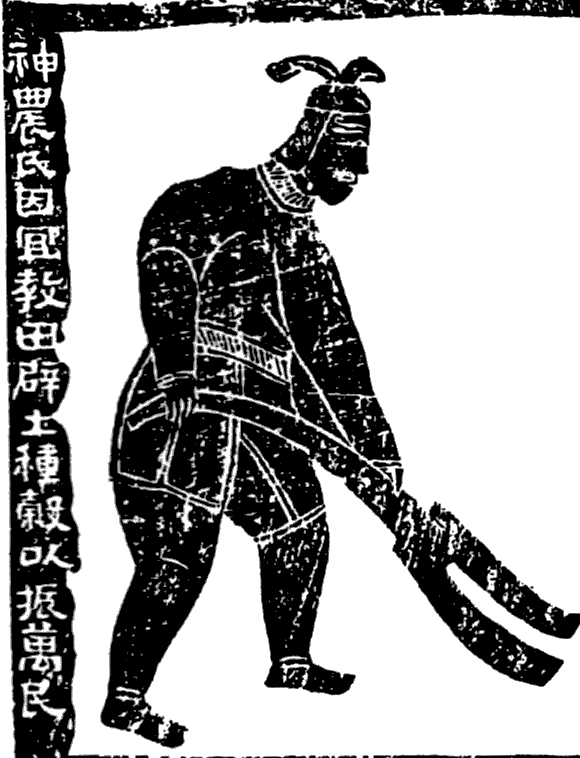
- Emperor Shennong as depicted in Wu Family Shrines in Jiaxiang, Shandong, from the mid 2nd century AD.

Yan Emperor
- Reign: 120 years
- Successor: Linkui
- Born: Jiang Shinian (姜石年)
- Issue: Linkui
- Clan: Shennong
- Father: Shaodian
- Mother: Nüdeng

Emperor Shennong
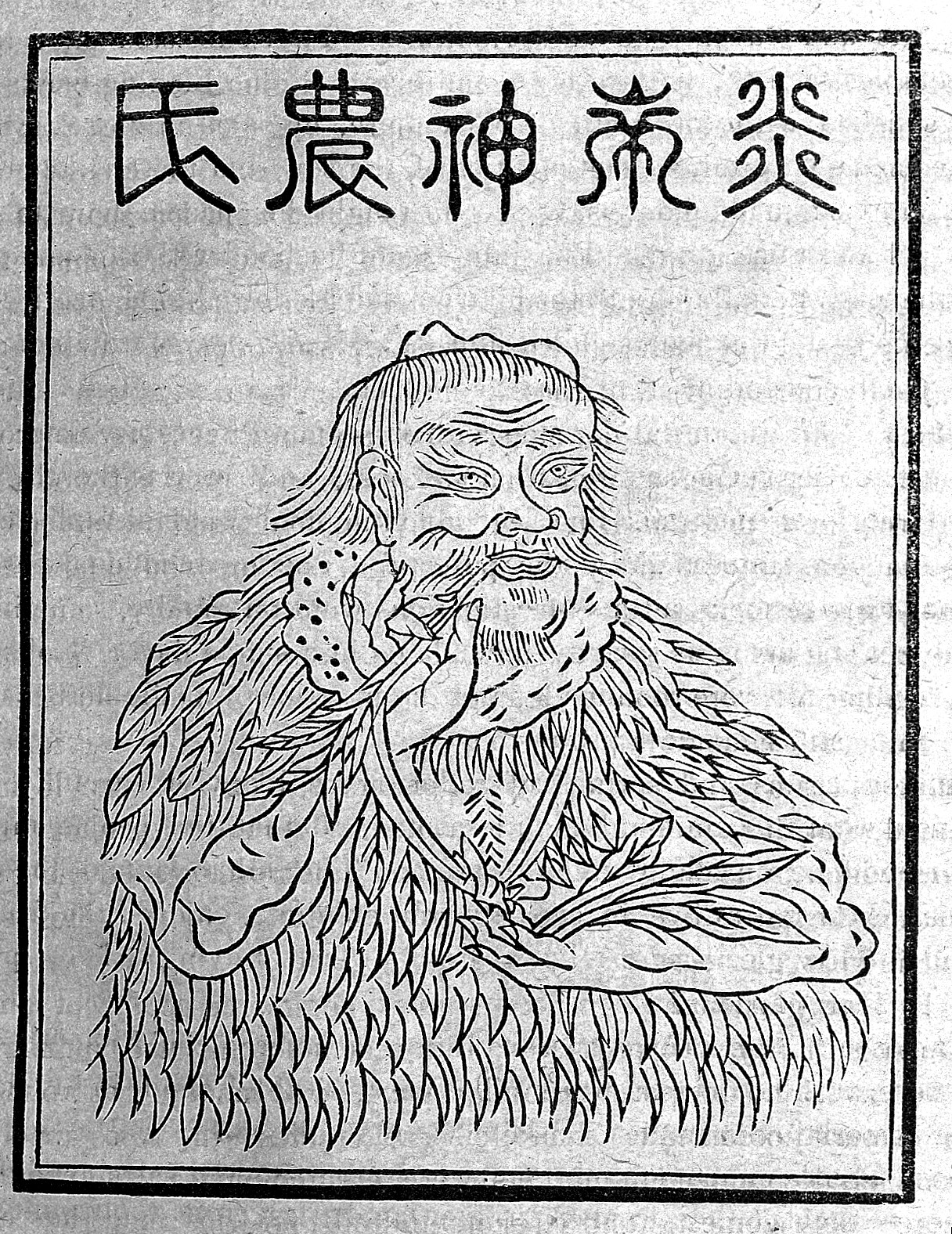
- Portrait of Shennong featuring his title and clan in small seal script.

Chinese name
- Traditional Chinese: 神農
- Simplified Chinese: 神农
- Literal meaning: "Divine Farmer/Husbandman"
Transcriptions
Standard Mandarin
- Hanyu Pinyin: Shénnóng
- Wade–Giles: Shen^{2}-nung^{2}
- IPA: [ʂə̌n.nʊ̌ŋ]
Hakka
- Romanization: Sṳ̀n-nùng
Yue: Cantonese
- Yale Romanization: Sàhn-nùhng
- Jyutping: San4-nung4
- IPA: [sɐn˩.nʊŋ˩]
Southern Min
- Hokkien POJ: Sîn-lông

Vietnamese name
- Vietnamese alphabet: Thần Nông
- Chữ Hán: 神農

Korean name
- Hangul: 신농
- Hanja: 神農
Transcriptions
- Revised Romanization: Sinnong

Japanese name
- Kanji: 神農
Transcriptions
- Romanization: Shin'nō

Shennong (Chinese: 神農; pinyin: Shénnóng), variously translated as "Divine Farmer" or "Divine Husbandman", born Jiang Shinian (姜石年), was a mythological Chinese ruler known as the Yan Emperor and a deity in Chinese folk religion. He is venerated as a culture hero in China.

Shennong has at times been counted amongst the Three Sovereigns (also known as "Three Kings" or "Three Patrons"), a group of ancient deities or deified kings of prehistoric China. Shennong has been thought to have taught the ancient Chinese not only their practices of agriculture, but also the use of herbal medicine. Shennong was credited with various inventions: these include the hoe, plow (both leisi (耒耜) style and the plowshare), axe, digging wells, agricultural irrigation, preserving stored seeds by using boiled horse urine (to ward off the borers), trade, commerce, money, the weekly farmers market, the Chinese calendar (especially the division into the 24 jieqi or solar terms). He is also attributed to have refined the therapeutic understanding of taking pulse measurements, acupuncture, and moxibustion, as well as having instituted the harvest thanksgiving ceremony (zhaji (蜡祭) sacrificial rite, later known as the laji (腊祭) rite).

"Shennong" can also be taken to refer to his people, the Shennong clan.

== Mythology ==
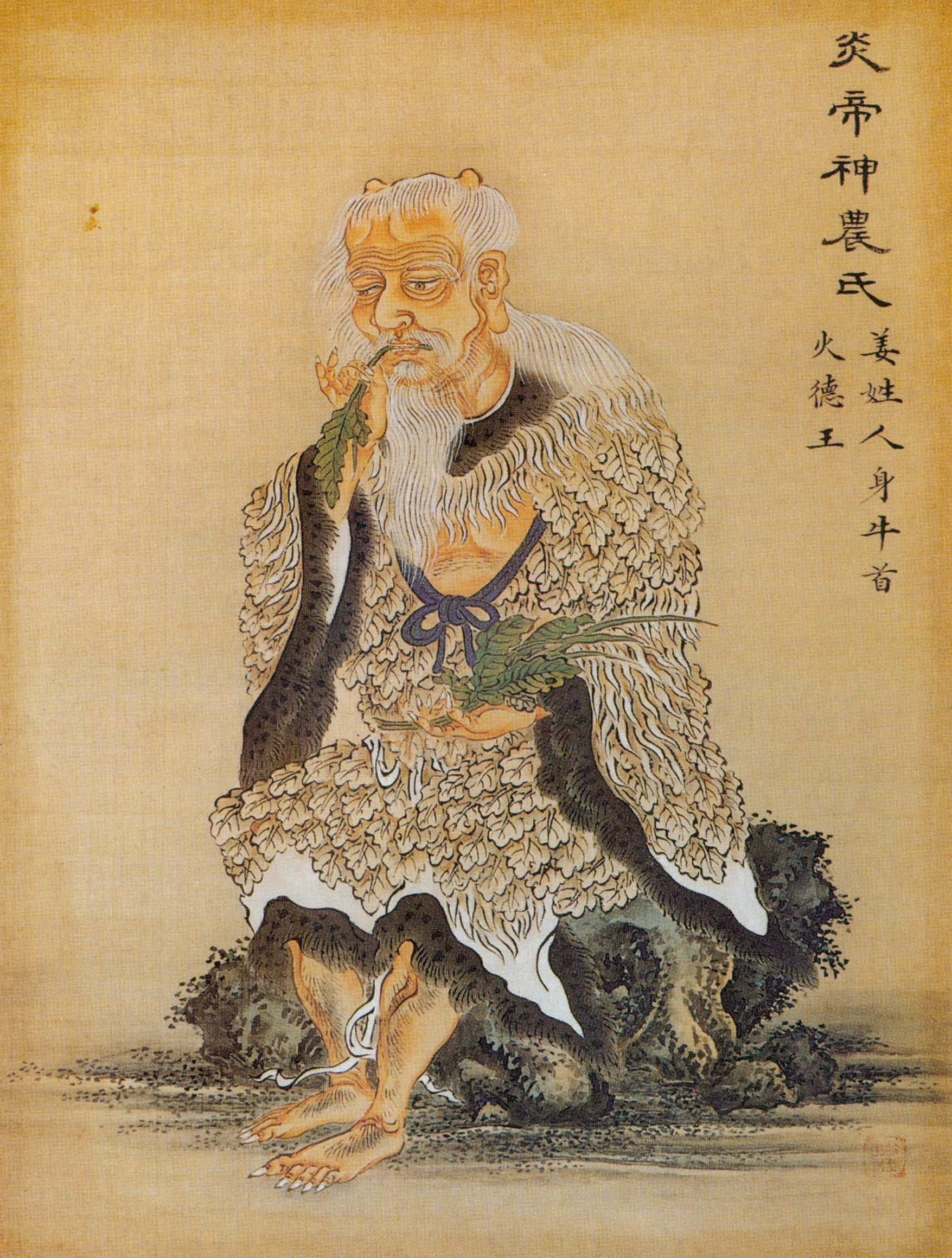
Portrait of Shennong by Xu Jetian, 18th century.

According to legend, Shennong's mother swallowed the vapor of a dragon and nine days later, her son was born on the banks of the river Jiang. He had a bull (or ox's) head with a man's body. He developed rapidly and began speaking after three days, eventually growing to over eight feet tall.

In Chinese mythology, he obtained a mystical book of herbs from a Taoist master and later journeyed across China to record 365 medicinal herbs and fungi that became essential in traditional Chinese medicine. Shennong also taught humans the use of the plow, aspects of basic agriculture, and the use of cannabis. Possibly influenced by the Yan Emperor mythos or the use of slash-and-burn agriculture, Shennong was a god of burning wind. He was also sometimes said to be a progenitor to, or to have had as one of his ministers, Chiyou (and like him, was ox-headed, sharp-horned, bronze-foreheaded, and iron-skulled).

Shennong is also thought to be the father of the Yellow Emperor (黃帝) who carried on the secrets of medicine, immortality, and making gold. According to the eighth century AD historian Sima Zhen's commentary to the second century BC Shiji (or, Records of the Grand Historian), Shennong is a kinsman of the Yellow Emperor and is said to be an ancestor, or a patriarch, of the ancient forebears of the Chinese.

After the Zhou dynasty, Shennong was thought to have existed within it by some "ancient Chinese historians" and religious practitioners as the "deified" form of "mythical wise king" Hou Ji whose descendants later founded the Zhou.

As an alternative to this view, Shennong was also thought of in the era of the Hundred Schools of Thought as a culture hero rather than a god, but one with a supernatural digestive system who ate a specimen of every single plant that existed in the time of the Hundred Schools to find which ones were edible by humans. In the third century BCE, during times of political crisis and expansionism and wars among Chinese kingdoms, Shennong received new myths about his status as an ideal prehistoric ruler who valued laborers and farmers and "ruled without ministers, laws or punishments."

== In literature ==
Sima Qian (司馬遷) mentioned that the rulers directly preceding the Yellow Emperor were of the house (or societal group) of Shennong. Sima Zhen, who added a prologue for the Records of the Grand Historian (史記), said his surname was Jiang (姜), and proceeded to list his successors. An older and more famous reference is in the Huainanzi; it tells how, prior to Shennong, people were sickly, wanting, starved and diseased; but he then taught them agriculture, which he himself had researched, eating hundreds of plants — and even consuming seventy poisons in one day. Shennong also features in the book popularly known in English as I Ching. Here, he is referenced as coming to power after the end of the house (or reign) of Paoxi (Fu Xi), also inventing a bent-wood plow, a cut-wood rake, teaching these skills to others, and establishing a noonday market. Another reference is in the Lüshi Chunqiu, mentioning some violence with regard to the rise of the Shennong house, and that their power lasted seventeen generations.

The Shénnóng Běn Cǎo Jīng is a book on agriculture and medicinal plants, attributed to Shennong. Research suggests that it is a compilation of oral traditions, written between about 200 and 250 AD.

== Historicity ==
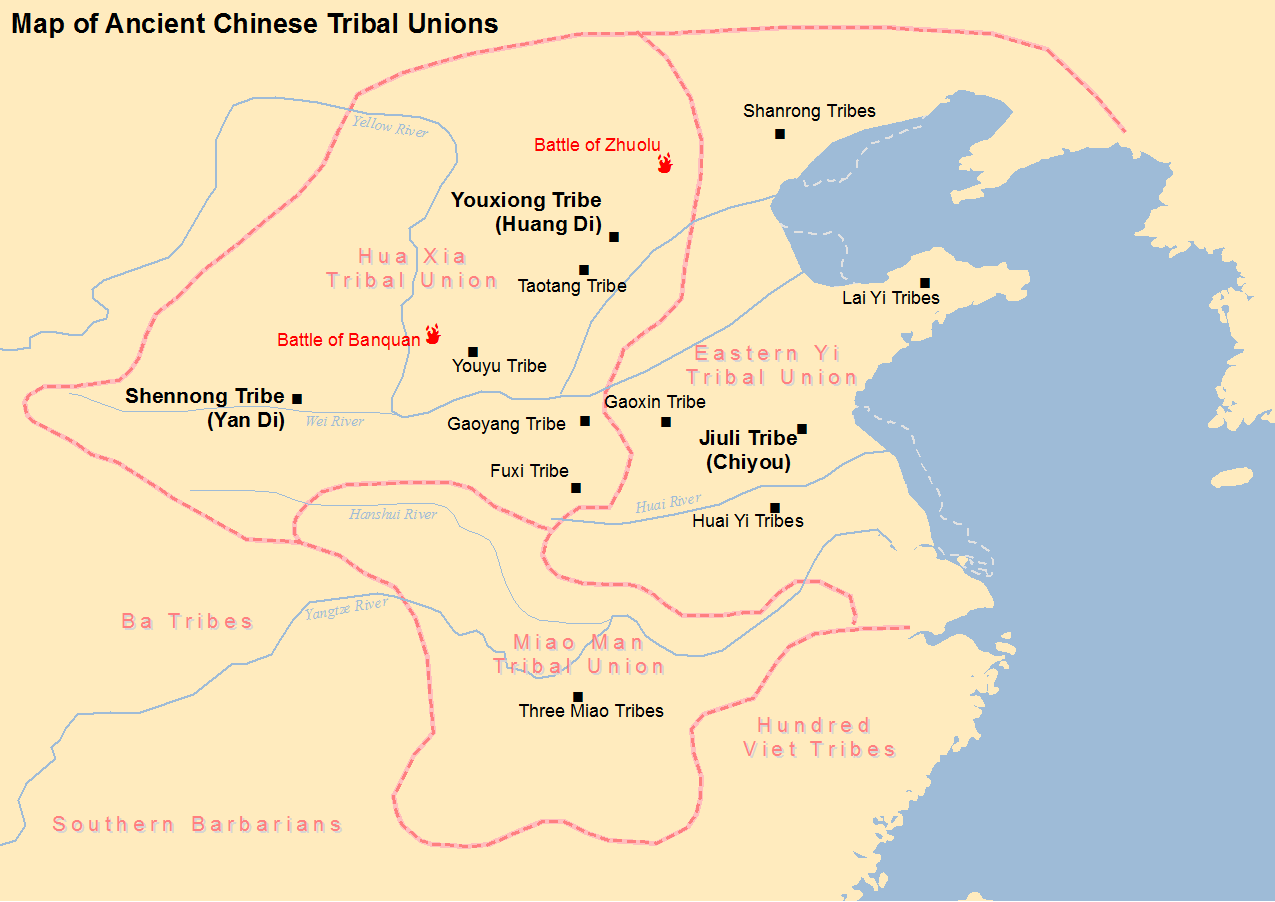
Map of tribes and tribal unions in Ancient China. The tribe of Shennong is in the west.

Reliable information on the history of China before the 13th century BC can come only from archaeological evidence because China's first established written system on a durable medium, the oracle bone script, did not exist until then. Thus, the concrete existence of even the Xia dynasty, said to be the successor to Shennong, is yet to be proven, despite efforts by Chinese archaeologists to link that dynasty with Bronze Age Erlitou archaeological sites.

However, Shennong, both the individual and the clan, are very important in Chinese cultural history, especially in regards to mythology and popular culture. Indeed, Shennong figures extensively in historical literature.

== Popular religion ==
According to some versions of the myths about Shennong, he eventually died as a result of his researches into the properties of plants by experimenting upon his own body, after, in one of his tests, he ate the yellow flower of a weed that caused his intestines to rupture before he had time to swallow his antidotal tea. The poisonous weed is thought to have been heartbreak grass (gelsemium elegans), as reported in chapter 6 of David Gibson's Planting Clues. Having thus given his life for humanity, he has since received special honor through his worship as the Medicine King (藥王; Yàowáng). The sacrifice of cows or oxen to Shennong in his various manifestations is never at all appropriate; instead pigs and sheep are acceptable. Fireworks and incense may also be used, especially at the appearance of his statue on his birthday, the 26th day of the fourth lunar month, according to popular tradition. Under his various names, Shennong is the patron deity of farmers, rice traders, and practitioners of traditional Chinese medicine. Many temples and other places dedicated to his commemoration exist.

== Popular culture ==
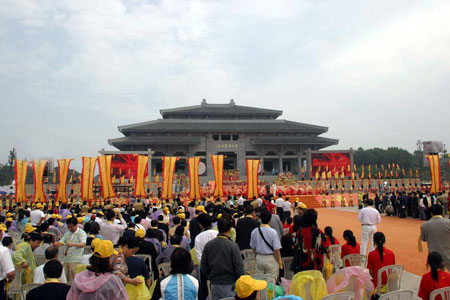
Communal worship of Shennong at the Great Temple of Yandi Shennong (炎帝神农大殿) in Suizhou, Hubei.

As noted above, Shennong is said in the Huainanzi to have tasted hundreds of herbs to test their medical value. The most well-known work attributed to Shennong is The Divine Farmer's Herb-Root Classic (神农本草经; 神農本草經; Shénnóng Běncǎo Jīng; Shen^{2}-nung^{2} Pen^{3}-ts'ao^{3} Ching^{1}), first compiled some time during the end of the Western Han Dynasty — several thousand years after Shennong might have existed. This work lists the various medicinal herbs, such as lingzhi, and marijuana that were discovered by Shennong and given grade and rarity ratings. It is considered to be the earliest Chinese pharmacopoeia, and includes 365 medicines derived from minerals, plants, and animals. Shennong is credited with identifying hundreds of medical (and poisonous) herbs by personally testing their properties, which was crucial to the development of traditional Chinese medicine. Legend holds that Shennong had a transparent body, and thus could see the effects of different plants and herbs on himself. He is also said to have discovered tea, which he found it to be acting as an antidote against the poisonous effects of some seventy herbs he tested on his body. Shennong first tasted it, traditionally in ca. 2437 BC, from tea leaves on burning tea twigs, after they were carried up from the fire by the hot air, landing in his cauldron of boiling water. Shennong is venerated as the Father of Chinese medicine. He is also believed to have introduced the technique of acupuncture.

Shennong is said to have played a part in the creation of the guqin, together with Fuxi and the Yellow Emperor. Scholarly works mention that the paternal family of famous Song dynasty General Yue Fei traced their origins back to Shennong.

== Places ==
Shennong is associated with certain geographic localities including Shennongjia, in Hubei, where the Calamoideae ladder which he used to climb the local mountain range is supposed to have transformed into a vast forest. The Shennong Stream flows from here into the Yangtze River.

== Gallery ==
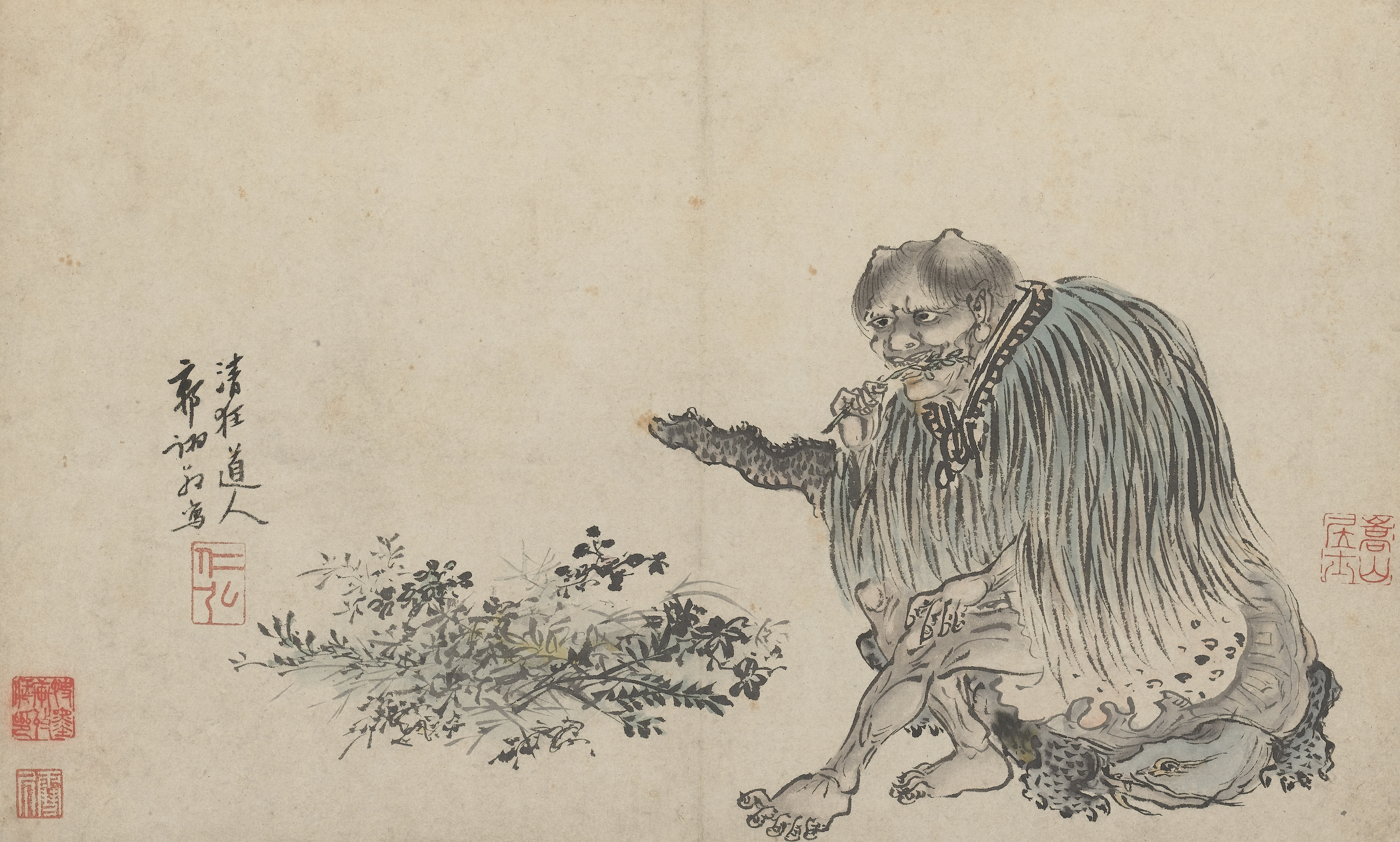
Shennong as depicted in a 1503 painting, by Guo Xu

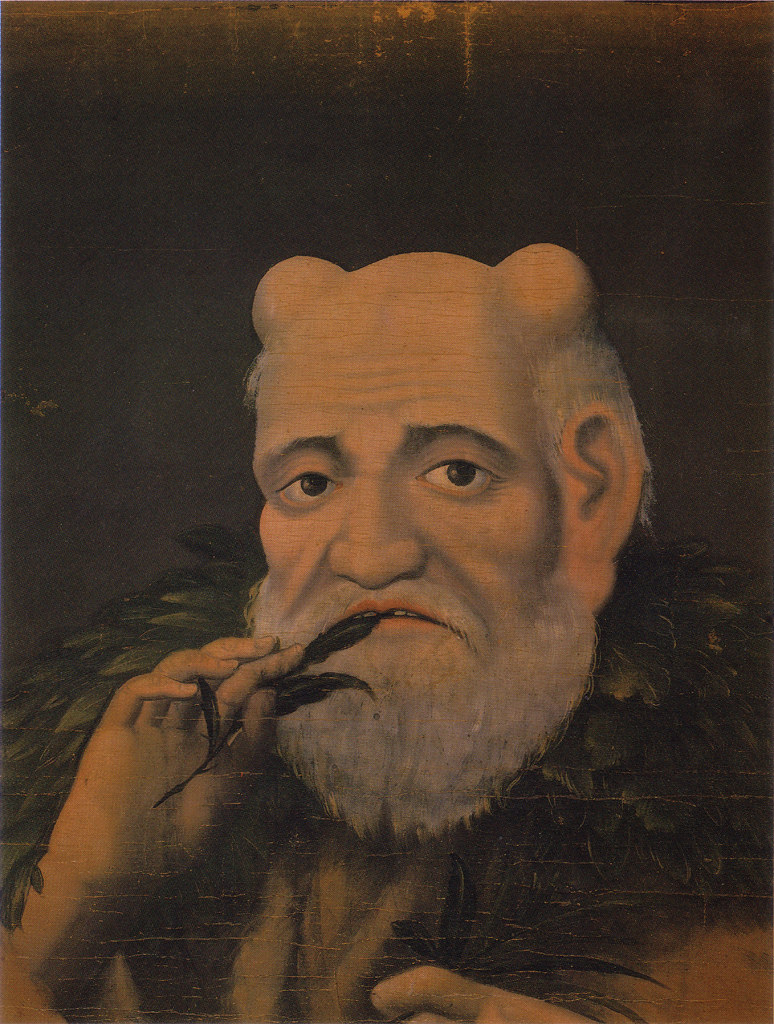
Shennong holding tea leaves, by Hasegawa Nobukata, early 17th century, Japan.

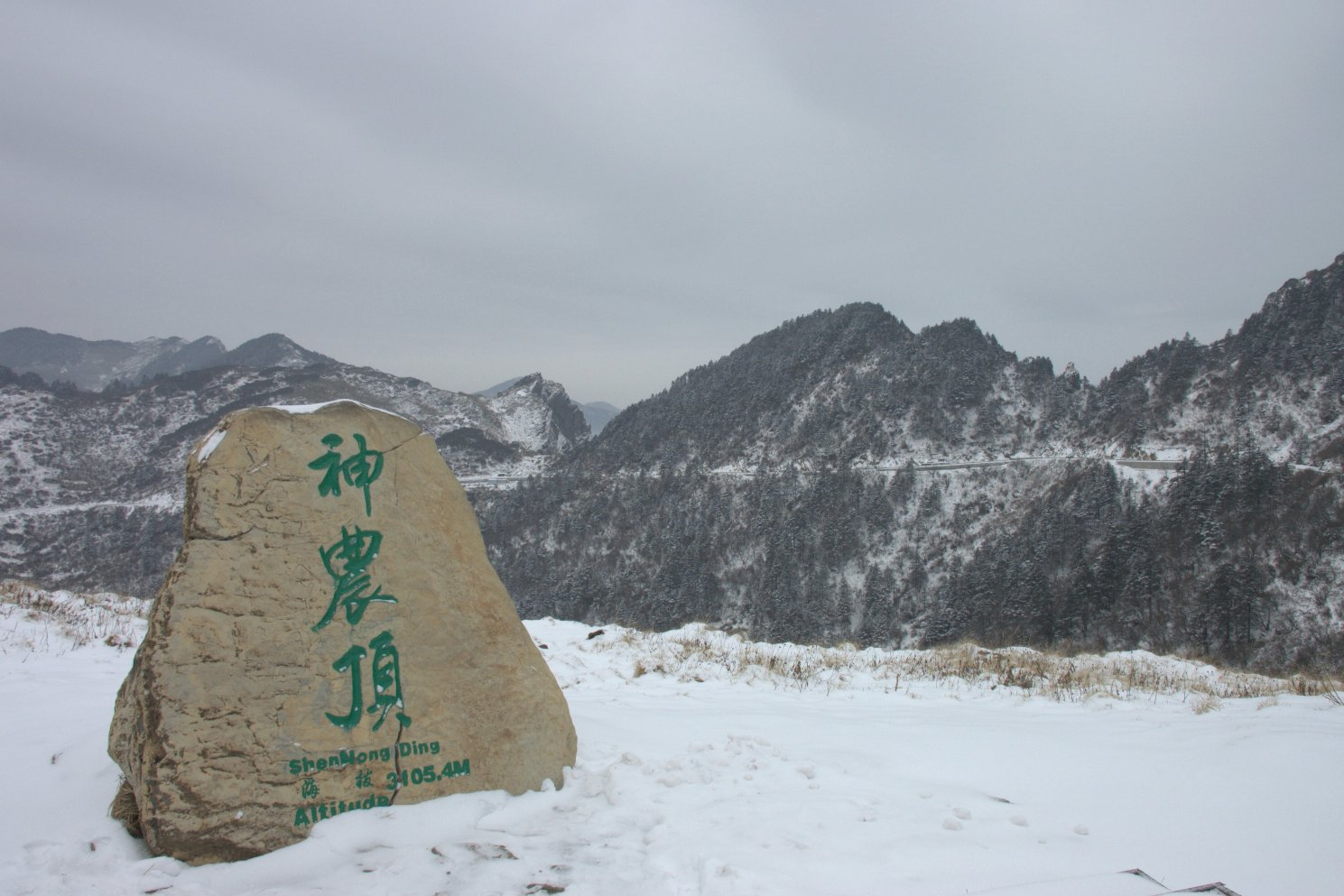
Shennongding (神農頂): "Shennong's peak", associated with the story that Shennong had a ladder which he used to climb up and down the mountain, and which later turned into the local forest.

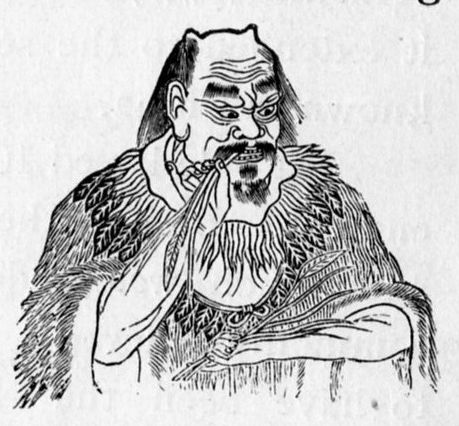
Shennong tasting plants to test their qualities on himself.

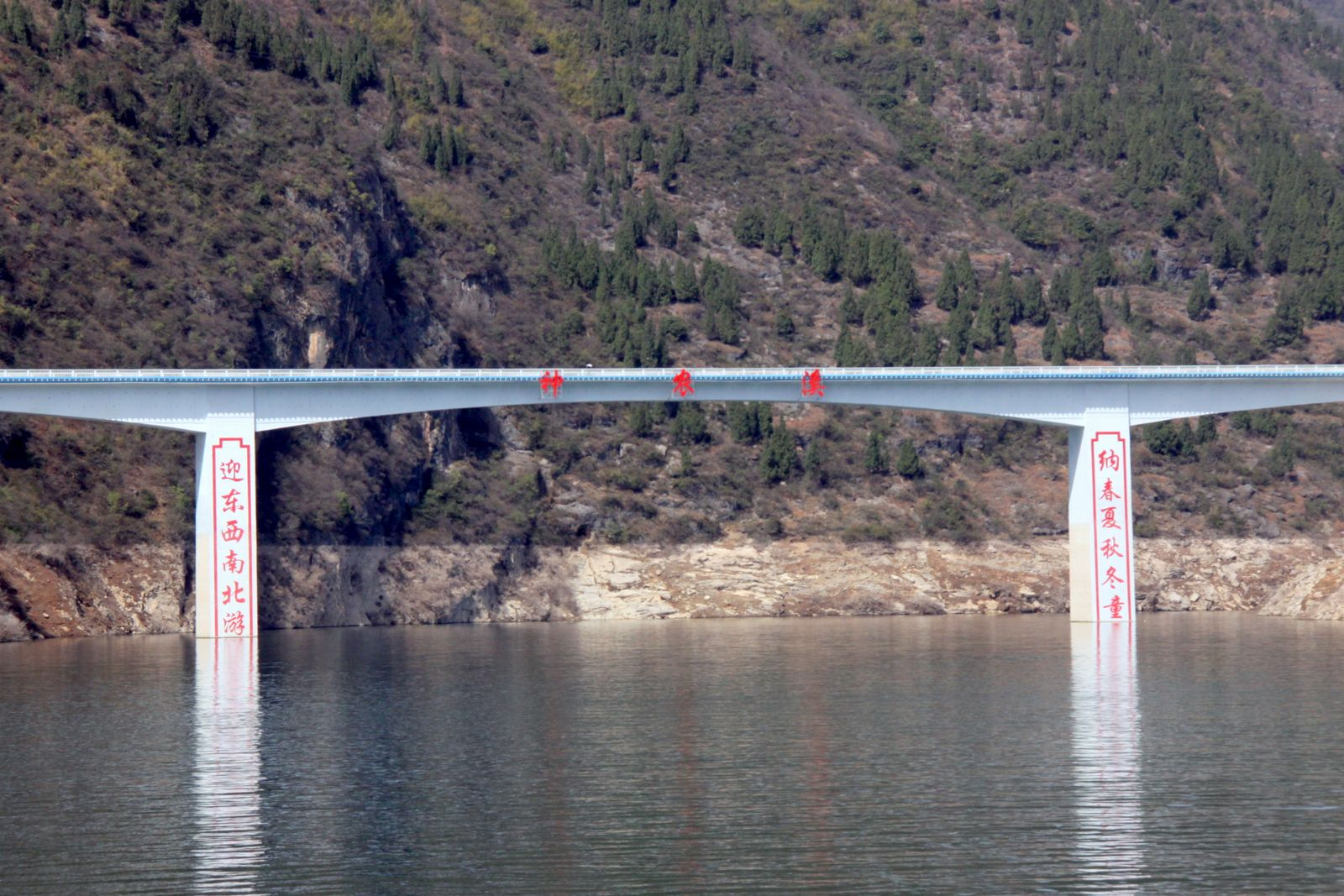
The Shennongxi (神農溪) Bridge near its confluence with the Yangtze River.

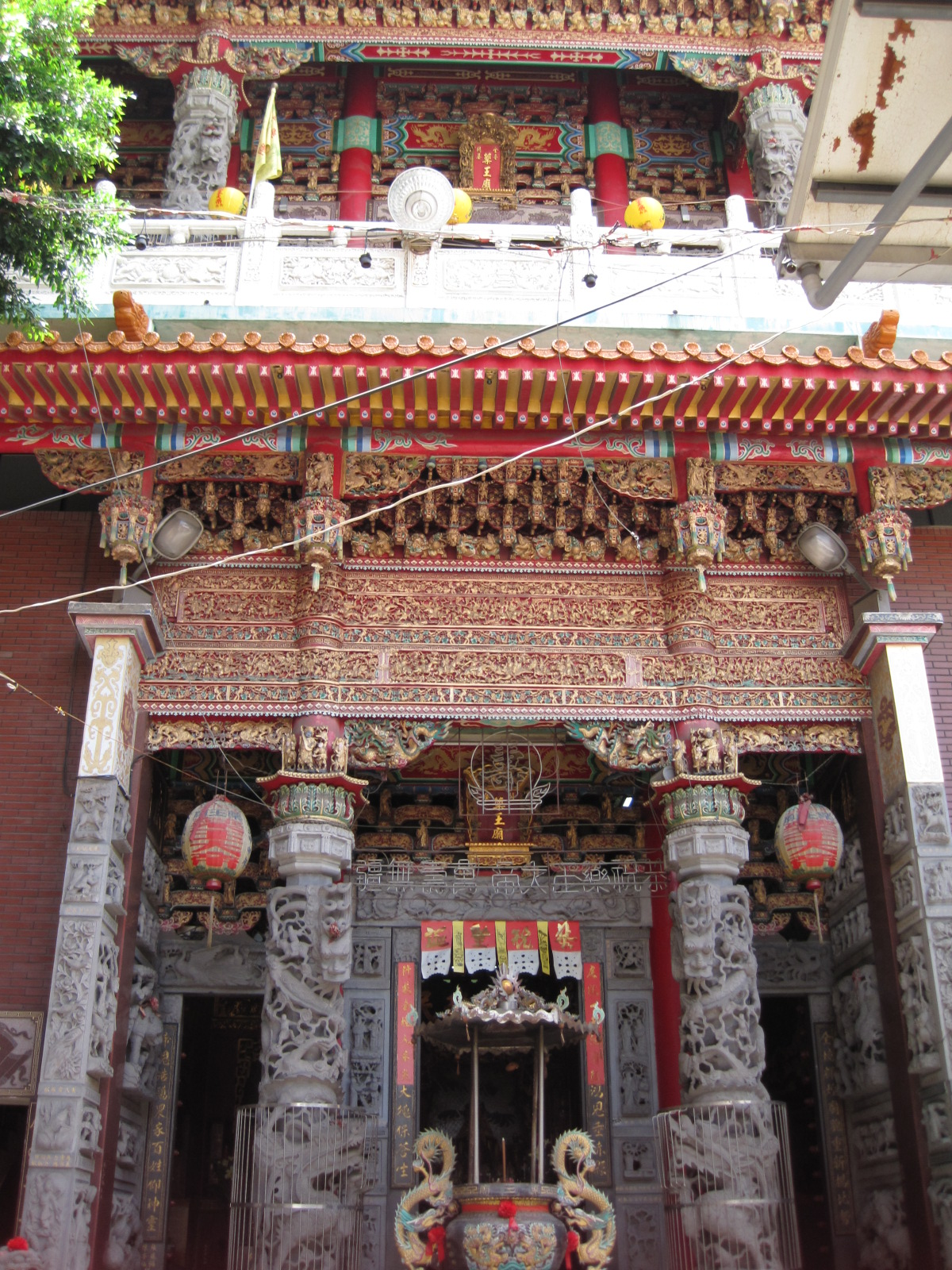
Shennong Temple in Tainan, Taiwan — where he is worshiped under the names King Yan (炎帝), God of Five Grains (五穀神), Shennong the Great Emperor, the Ancestor of Farming, Great Emperor of Medicine, God of Earth, and God of Fields.

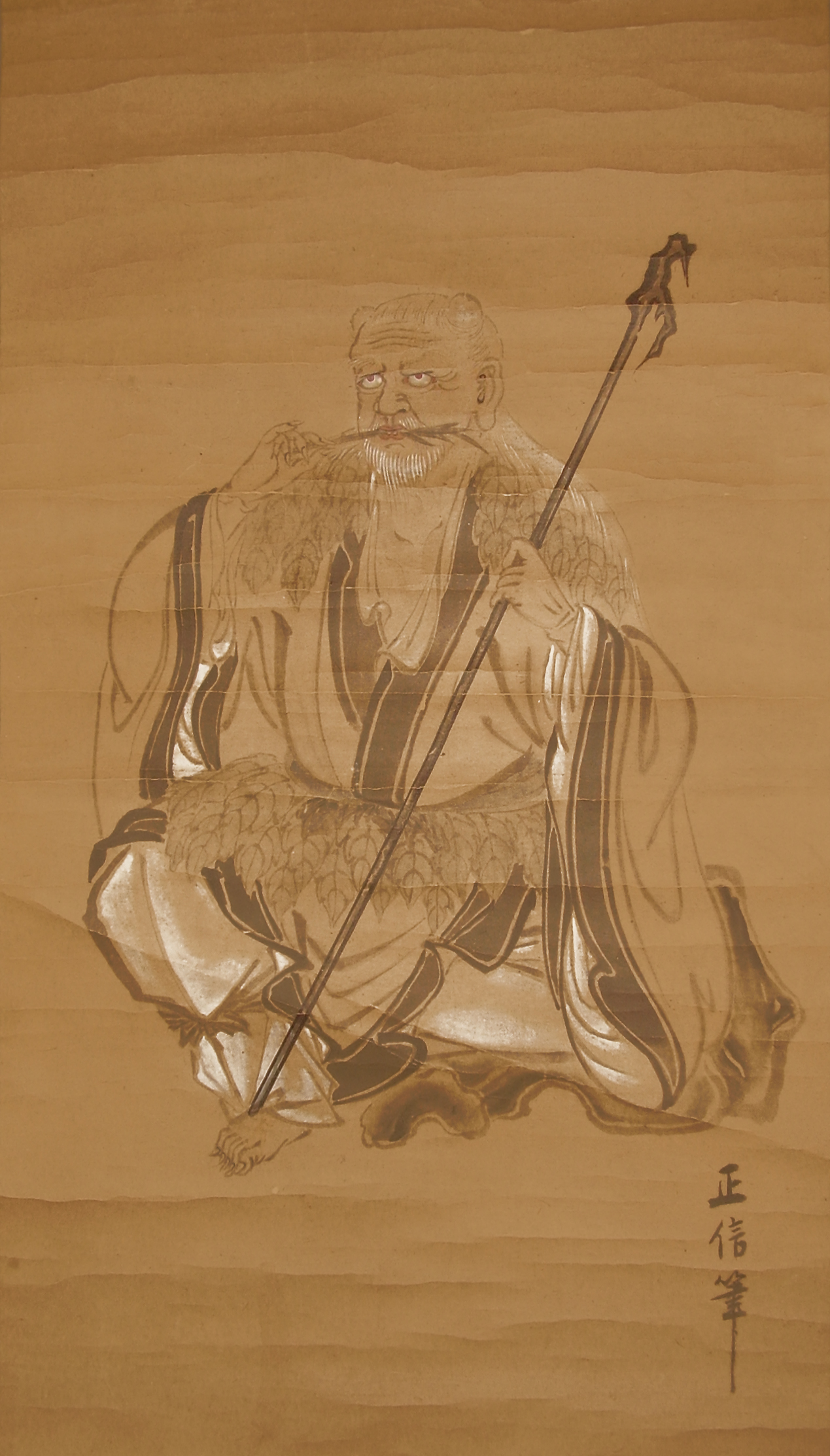
Shennong (Shinnō in Japanese) tasting herbs to discover their qualities; a distinctive, iconic pose often used in depictions of Shennong; in this case from a 19th-century Japanese painting.

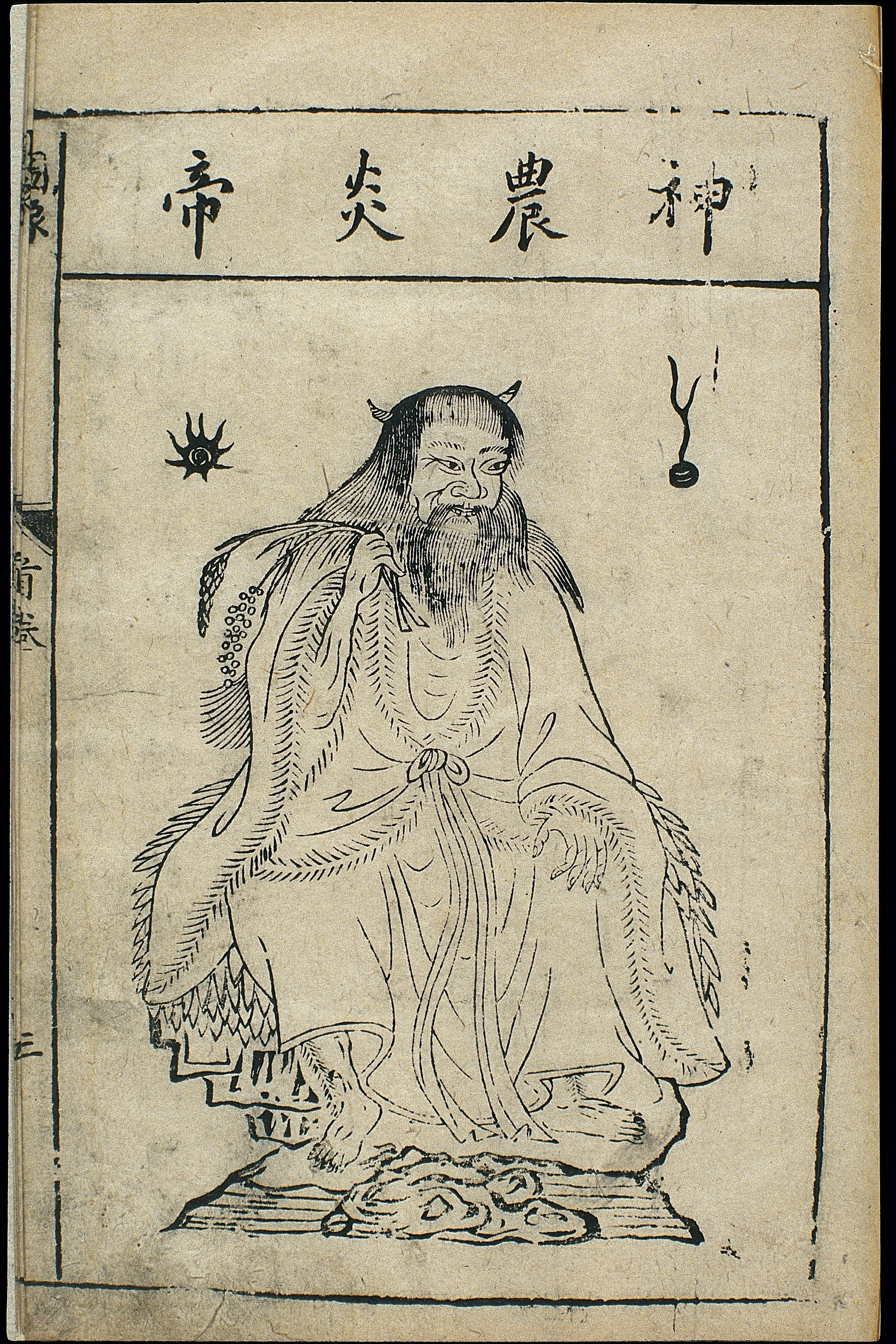
Shennong as depicted by Tang dynasty (618–907) figure Gan Bozong (甘伯宗), woodcut print in the Lìdài míngyì huà xìngshì (历代名医畵姓氏) a preface of an edition of the Ming dynasty book Běncǎoméngquán (本草蒙筌) by Chen Jiamo (陈嘉谟).

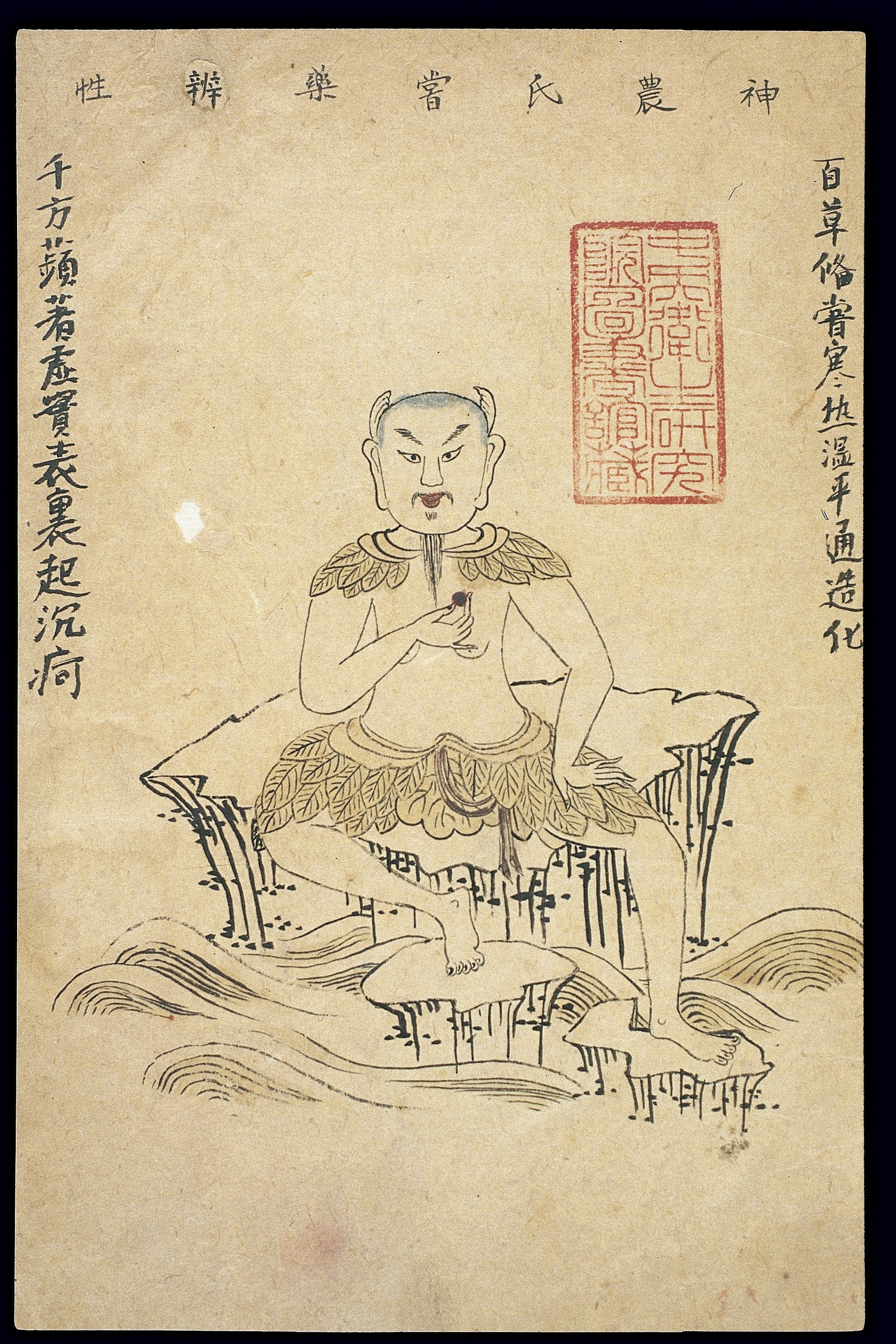
Chinese paintings of famous physicians: Shen Nong

== See also ==
- Yan Huang Zisun
- Shennong Stream
- Shilin Shennong Temple, Taiwan
- Three Sovereigns and Five Emperors
- Yan Emperor
- Yellow Emperor

Similar deities in other culture

- Phou Ningthou

Shennong Three Sovereigns and Five Emperors
Regnal titles
Preceded by Nüwa	Sovereign of China	Succeeded by Xuanyuan
