= Yan Emperor =

Legendary ancient Chinese title

Yan Emperor of Ancient China
- 炎帝
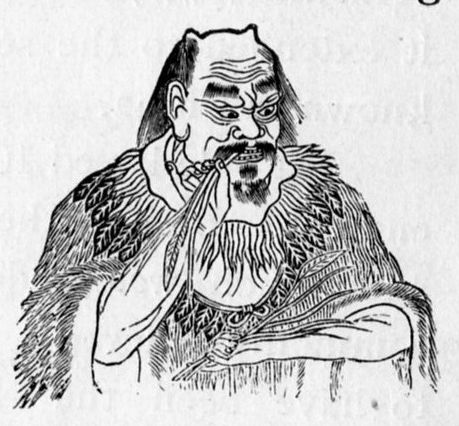
- Shennong tastes herbs to discover their qualities. 1913 depiction

Details
- First monarch: Shennong
- Last monarch: Yuwang
- Formed: Three Sovereigns and Five Emperors
- Abolished: Battle of Banquan

Yan Emperor
- Chinese: 炎帝
- Literal meaning: Flame Emperor
Transcriptions
Standard Mandarin
- Hanyu Pinyin: Yándì
- Wade–Giles: Yen-ti
Yue: Cantonese
- Jyutping: Yim^{4} Dai^{3}

The Yan Emperor (Chinese: 炎帝; pinyin: Yán Dì) or the Flame Emperor was a legendary ancient Chinese emperor in pre-dynastic times. Some modern Chinese scholars have identified the Sheep's Head Mountains (Yángtóu Shān) in Weibin District, Baoji as his homeland and territory.

A long debate has existed over whether or not the Yan Emperor was the same person as the legendary Shennong. An academic conference held in China in 2004 achieved general consensus that the Yan Emperor and Shennong were the same person. Another possibility is that the term "Yan Emperor" or "Flame Emperor" was a title, held by dynastic succession of tribal lords, with Shennong being known as Yandi perhaps posthumously. Accordingly, the term "Yan Emperors" or "Flame Emperors" would be generally more correct. The succession of these Yan or Flame emperors, from Shennong, the first Yan Emperor, until the time of the last Yan Emperor's defeat by the Yellow Emperor, may have been some 500 years.

== Historical records ==
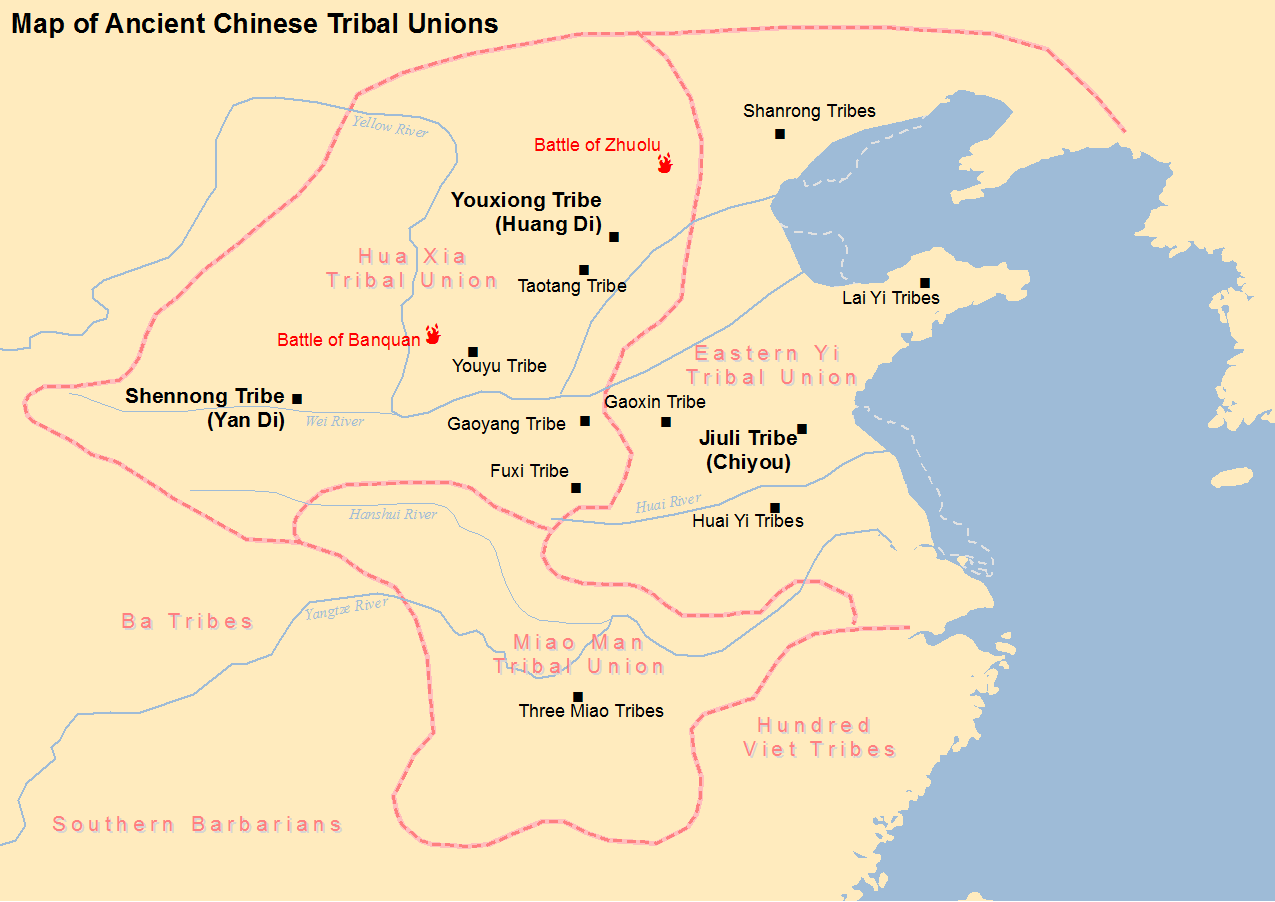
Map of tribes and tribal unions in Ancient China, including tribes of Huang Di (Yellow Emperor), Yan Di (Flame Emperor) and Chiyou.

No written records are known to exist from the era of Yan Emperor's reign. However, he and Shennong are mentioned in many of the classic works of ancient China. Yan literally means "flame", implying that Yan Emperor's people possibly uphold a symbol of fire as their tribal totems. K. C. Wu speculates that this appellation may be connected with the use of fire to clear the fields in slash and burn agriculture. In any case, it appears that agricultural innovations by Shennong and his descendants contributed to some sort of socioeconomic success that led them to style themselves as di (帝; 'emperors'), rather than hou (侯; 'lord'), as in the case of lesser tribal leaders. At this time it appears that there were only the bare beginnings of written language, and that for record keeping a system of knotting strings (perhaps similar to quipu) was in use. The Zuo Zhuan states that in 525 BC, the descendants of Yan were recognized as long having been masters of fire and having used fire in their names. Yan Emperor was known as "Emperor of the South"

== Downfall ==
The last Yan Emperor, Yuwang, met the end of his reign in the third of a series of three battles, known as the Battle of Banquan. The exact location of this battle is disputed among modern historians, due to multiple locations adopting the same name at various points through history. Possible candidates include Zhuolu County and Huailai County in Zhangjiakou, Hebei, Yanqing District in Beijing, Fugou County in Zhoukou, Henan, and Yanhu District in Yuncheng, Shanxi.

The Yan Emperor, retreating from a recent invasion from the forces of Chiyou, came into territorial conflict with its neighbouring Youxiong tribes, led by the Yellow Emperor. The Yan Emperor was defeated after three successive battles and surrendered to the Yellow Emperor, who assumed the title of overlord (共主) and agreed to merge the two tribes into a new confederation — the Yanhuang tribe. Under the Yellow Emperor's leadership, the newly combined tribes then went to war and defeated Chiyou in the Battle of Zhuolu, and established their cultural and political dominance in Central Plains China.

== Historicity ==
Since the Battle of Banquan is treated as a historical fact by Sima Qian in his Records of the Grand Historian, it would appear that this is a pivotal transition point between mythology and history. Ironically, the Yan Emperor enters history only with his submission to the will of the Yellow Emperor. In any case, the title of flame emperor apparently lapsed after this time. His tribe's descendants were said to be perpetuated through intermarriage with that of the Yellow Emperor, and Han Chinese throughout history have referred themselves as the "Descendants of Yan and Huang".

== In traditional culture ==
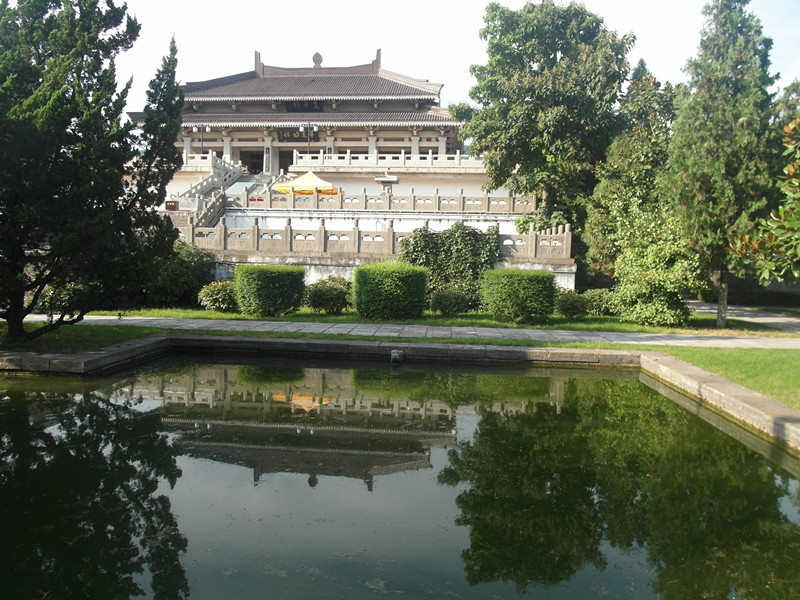
A temple dedicated to the worship of Yandi in Weibin District, Baoji

Both Huangdi and Yandi are considered in some sense ancestral to Chinese culture and people. Also, the tradition of associating a certain color with a particular dynasty may have begun with the Flame Emperors. According to the Five Elements, or Wu Xing model, red, fire, should be succeeded by yellow, earth—or Yandi by Huangdi.

According to the records of ancient history books by the Vietnamese such as Đại Việt sử ký toàn thư, the earliest monarch of Vietnam, Hồng Bàng, was allegedly a descendant of Emperor Yan. Because of this, all the ancient Vietnamese dynasties claim Emperor Yan as their common ancestor.

== List of Flame Emperors ==
This is the most common list given by Huangfu Mi, Xu Zheng, and Sima Zhen:

Name	Notes
Shennong 神農	Born Jiang Shinian 姜石年
Linkui 臨魁	
Cheng 承	
Ming 明	Considered father of Zhi and Loc Tuc in Vietnamese mythography.
Zhi 直	Father of Li (Lai).
Li 釐 or Ke 克 or Lai (來)	Sima Zhen puts him between Ai and Yuwang. Emperor Li (Lai) Considered father of Au Co in Vietnamese mythography, as Li and Lai are variant spellings.
Ai 哀	
Yuwang 榆罔	Defeated by Yellow Emperor at Banquan

List provided at the end of the Shan Hai Jing:

Name	Notes
Yandi 炎帝	
Yanju 炎居	Also possibly known as Zhu 柱
Jiebing 節並	
Xiqi 戲器	
Zhurong 祝融	
Gonggong 共工	
Shuqi 術器	
Houtu 后土	Brother of Shuqi
Yeming 噎鳴	

== See also ==
- Descendants of Yan and Yellow Emperors
- Emperors Yan and Huang (monument)
- Huaxia
- Shennong
- Three Sovereigns and Five Emperors
- Yao Grass
- Yellow Emperor
- Zhonghua Minzu
