= Chiyou =

Legendary leader of the Jiuli tribe

Chiyou 蚩尤
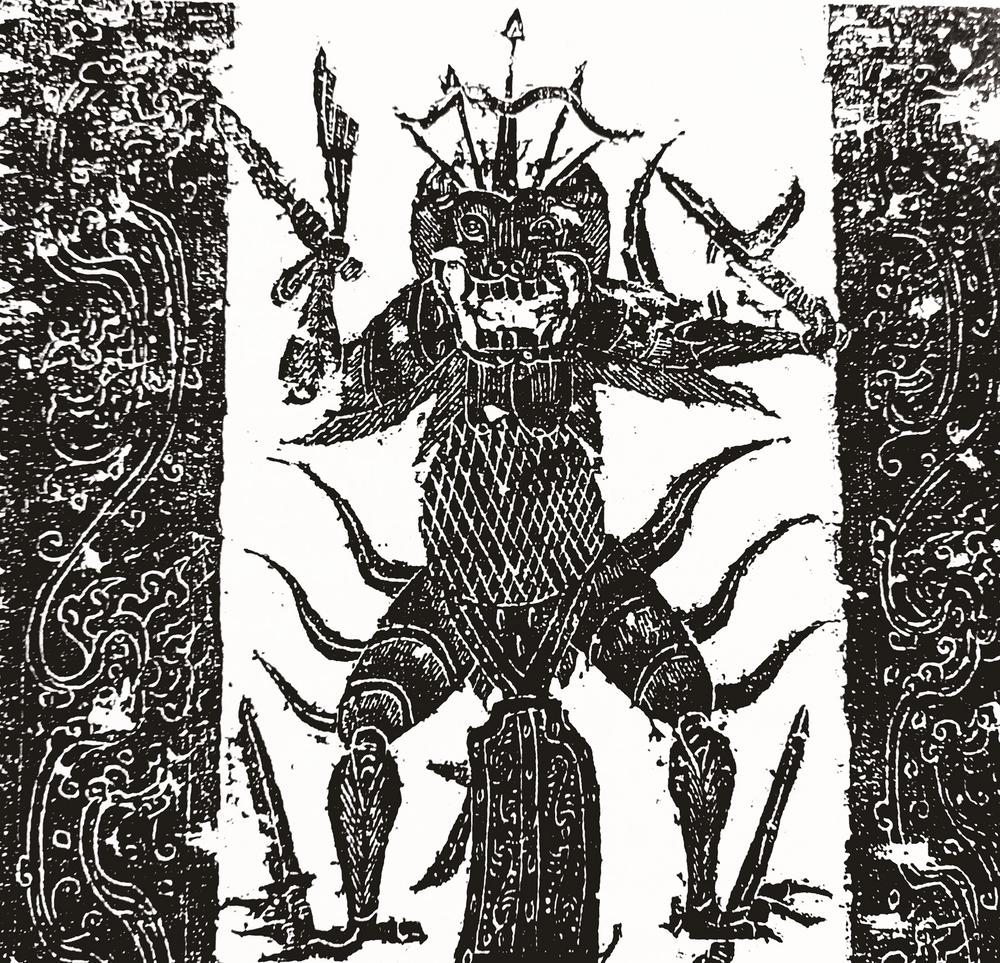
- Chiyou as depicted on a tomb relief of the Han dynasty

Ruler of the Jiuli
- Successor: Position abolished
- Died: Zhuolu
Names
- Family name: Jiang (姜)
Posthumous name
- Chi You (蚩尤, pejorative)
- Tribe: Jiuli
- Military career
- Allegiance: Jiuli tribe
- Conflicts: Battle of Zhuolu †

Chiyou
- Chinese: 蚩尤
- Literal meaning: Wormy Transgressor
Transcriptions
Standard Mandarin
- Hanyu Pinyin: chīyóu
- Wade–Giles: Chʻih^{1}-yu^{2}
- IPA: [ʈʂʰí.jǒʊ]
Yue: Cantonese
- Jyutping: ci^{1} jau^{4}
Middle Chinese
- Middle Chinese: /t͡ɕʰɨ ɦɨu/
Old Chinese
- Zhengzhang: /*tʰjɯ ɢʷɯ/

Chiyou (蚩尤) was a leader of the Jiuli tribe mentioned in traditional Chinese historiography of the legendary Three Sovereigns and Five Emperors period. A nemesis of the Yellow Emperor, he is best known for his role in the Battle of Zhuolu.

== Name ==
Chi (蚩) can translate to ignorant, ugly, uncouth, and/or one who is treated with contempt. You (尤) can translate to fault, error, shortcoming, one who finds fault, or a special case (wherein it can be an adverb akin to "especially". The name is therefore considered a pejorative title, compared with Di Xin being named "King Zhou of Shang" (lit. King "Horse Crupper") and Di Gui being named Jie of Xia (lit. "Savage of Xia"). The name Chiyou can therefore be translated as "ignorant fault."

According to the Song dynasty history book Lushi, Chiyou's surname was Jiang (姜), and he was a descendant of the Flame Emperor.

== Appearance ==
According to legend, Chiyou had a bronze head with a distinct metal forehead. He had four eyes and six arms, wielding terrible sharp weapons in every hand, similar to a description of fangxiangshi. In some sources, Chiyou had certain features associated with various mythological bovines: his head was that of a bull with two horns, although the body was human, and his hindquarters were those of a bear. He is said to have been unbelievably fierce, and to have had 81 brothers and many followers. Historical sources often described him as 'bold leader', as well as 'brave'. Some sources have asserted that the figure 81 should rather be associated with 81 clans in his kingdom. Chiyou knows the constellations and the ancients spells for calling upon the weather. For example, he called upon a fog to surround Huangdi and his soldiers during the Battle of Zhuolu.

== Reign ==
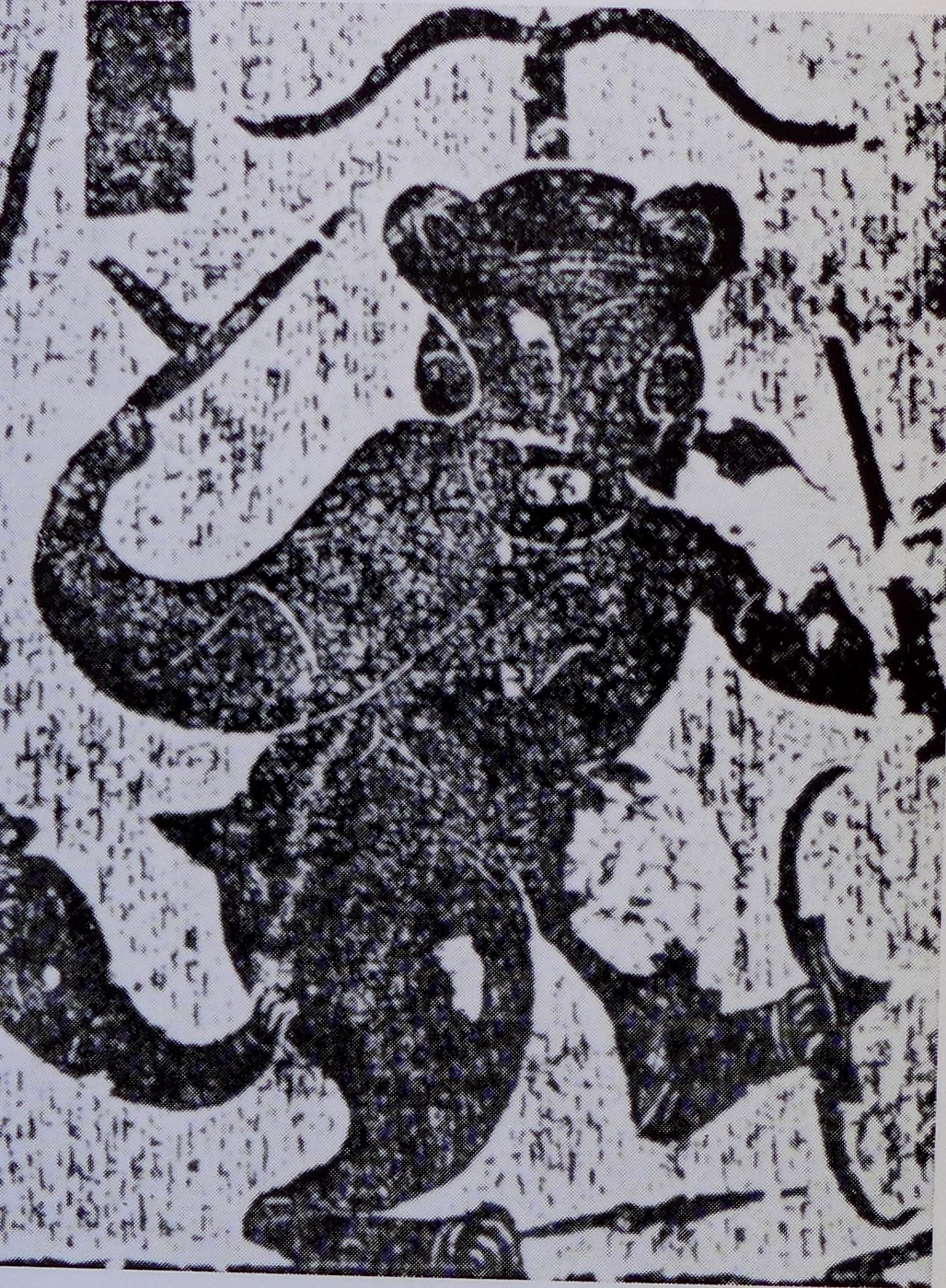
Wu family shrine stone carving of Chi You.

Chiyou was leader of the Jiuli tribe. However, his exact ethnic affiliations are quite complex, with multiple sources reporting him as belonging to various tribes, in addition to a number of diverse peoples supposedly descending from him. Some sources from later dynasties, such as Guoyu, considered the Jiuli to be related to the ancient Sanmiao tribe (三苗). In various sources, the Jiuli tribe is called the "Jiuli kingdom." Modern Han Chinese scholar Weng Dujian considers Jiuli and Sanmiao to be Man southerners. Chiyou has also been counted as part of the Dongyi.

In Records of the Grand Historian, Sima Qian records Chiyou as living during the period in which the Youxiong clan was most dominant. He would hold a bent banner resembling a Broom Star, which Sima believed signified his attempts to conquer all of China under the Mandate of Heaven. The Warring States Lost Book of Zhou records Chiyou as having been assigned to monitor the four directions under Shaohao, only to betray him and frighten the Red Emperor. The Yue Jue Shu from Eastern Han expands on this, saying that Chiyou was made Master of Metal when working with Shaohao.

=== Battle of Zhuolu ===
During his reign, Xuanyuan, the Yellow Emperor, would engage in punitive expeditions to subdue those who would not submit. Chiyou, however, stood firm. The last Flame Emperor and leader of the Shennong clan, Yuwang, wanted to invade the feudal lords of Chiyou's Jiuli tribe, but could not match him. After combining under the Yanhuang clan, Yuwang begged for help from the Yellow Emperor for assistance in subduing Chiyou. This would culminate in the Battle of Zhuolu. The battle lasted for 10 years with Chiyou having the upper hand.

The battle dragged on for days while the emperor's side was in danger. Only after the Yellow Emperor invented the south-pointing chariot, did he find his way out of the battlefield. The Classic of Mountains and Seas states that Chiyou then conjured up a heavy storm by calling Fengbo, a wind deity, and Yu Shi, a master of rain. The Yellow Emperor then called upon the drought demon Nüba, who blew away the storm clouds and cleared the battlefield. Chiyou and his army could not hold up, and were later killed by the Yellow Emperor. After this defeat, the Yellow Emperor is said to become the ancestor of all Huaxia. However, Nüba was unable to return to the sky from which she came, and thus, wherever she went, there was a drought. His followers were forced to live in the mountains and leave the land of the Jiuli.

=== Death ===
The fate of Chiyou at Zhuolu is uncertain. The earliest account from the Eastern Zhou Lost Book of Zhou states that Chiyou would eventually be captured and killed in Zhongji (中冀). However, the Han dynasty Jiaoshi Yilin states that Chiyou died in an area called Lushou (魯首). (Note: One line claims Chiyou died in the mouth of a fish, though this could be a scribal error given the graphic similarity between the characters.) Eastern Han scholar Fan Ye notes that the accounts of the Battle of Zhuolu usually end after Chiyou being defeated, but one esoteric poem notes that Emperor Yao of the Taotang clan received the Mandate of Heaven directly after the Battle of Zhuolu, with no elaboration.

== Folkloric accounts ==
The Classic of Mountains and Seas records a beast called Yinglong (應龍) which, ordered by the Yellow Emperor, killed Chiyou and Kuafu. It also records a maple tree where Chiyou discarded his shackles.

In one mythical episode, after Chiyou had claimed he could not be conquered, the goddess Nüwa dropped a stone tablet on him from Mount Tai. The stone failed to crush Chiyou, who managed to escape. From then on, the 5-finger-shaped stone tablet, inscribed "Mount Tai shigandang" (泰山石敢當) became a spiritual weapon to ward off evil and disasters.

== Legacy ==
Since the classical period, Chiyou has been deified and is often associated with chaos and war, earning him the status of a demon god in later mythological interpretations, especially in northern China. In some Daoist traditions, he is considered a demon or evil god representing war and violence. His image has also been used as a protective figure, especially by soldiers, who see him as a war deity capable of offering protection in battle. Conversely, for some Hmong people, Chiyou or Txiv Yawg was a sagacious mythical king. He has a particularly complex and controversial ancestry, as he may fall under Dongyi Miao or even Man, depending on the source and view.

In the Eastern Han text Da Dai Li Ji (大戴禮記), Confucius regards Chiyou as a "greedy commoner" who, in his lack of righteousness and affliction of greed, disregarded his family and caused his own demise. Wang Chong compares the punishment of disfigurement used by Chiyou, a form of torture, to that of the Qin dynasty. Sima Qian compared the brutality and war of the Qin dynasty to that of Chiyou's wars, claiming that there had not been so much bloodshed since those days.

A statue venerating Chiyou is present in Zhuolu Town as the original ancestor of the Miao people. Zhuolu is regarded as the birthplace of the Sanmiao / Miao people, the Hmong being a subgroup of the Miao.

According to the Records of the Grand Historian, Qin Shi Huang worshipped Chiyou as the God of War, and Liu Bang worshipped at Chiyou's shrine before his decisive battle against Xiang Yu. The mythical title God of War was given to Chiyou because the Yellow Emperor and Yan Emperor could not defeat Chiyou alone. Altogether, Chiyou won nine major battles including 80 minor confrontations. On the 10th and final war, both emperors combined their forces and conquered Chiyou. Chiyou remains as a figure of worship today.

Chiyou is also identified with the Taotie motif present on ritual bronze vessels. The historian Luo Bi, in his work the Lushi, writes of Chiyou that the Yellow Emperor "cut his head off; and for this reason sages later cast his portrait on bronzes to warn the greedy." Luo Bi's son, Luo Ping, then expanded on this, writing that:

Chiyou was a spirit of the heavenly magic; his nature and shape were never consistent. The bronzes from the three dynasties were often cast with Chiyou's portrait to warn those who are greedy. The form of Chiyou is most likely an animal, with the addition of wings of flesh; it started at the time of the Yellow Emperor.

In Chinese honghuang novels and online literature, Chiyou ranks first among the "Ten Great Demon Gods of Ancient Times", including Xingtian, Kuafu, Gonggong, Feilian, Pingyi, Shentu and Yulei, Houqing, Hanba, and Yinlingzi.

The Tale of Heike mentions a comet "of the type called Chiyou's Banner or Red Breath," referencing accounts of Chiyou's banner from Records of the Grand Historian.

== In popular culture ==
- Ch'ih-yu (conceptualized as a dragon) is one of the characters in the background story in The Settlers III.
- Chi You is a name for an Aragami creature in the PlayStation Portable game, God Eater.
- The comic book Heavenly Executioner Chiwoo is partly based on the legends about Chiyou.
- The main antagonist of the Shenmue saga, Lan Di is one of the leaders of a group called the Chi You Men, who seek to awake the power of the god Chi You.
- A series of South Korean bullion coins minted by KOMSCO feature Chiyou, referred to as the Chiwoo Cheonwang series.
- Chi You appears as an antagonist in the TMNT/Ghostbusters miniseries of the Teenage Mutant Ninja Turtles IDW comics continuity. Herein he is a godling or immortal creature who is engaged with others of his kind—including the Rat King and Kitsune—in a "game" for dominion over mankind.
- There is a mechanical mod used in the vaping community known as the Chi You.
- Chi You is a reoccurring demon in the Megami Tensei video game series, including games such as Persona 5.
- Chi You appears as sub-boss enemy in the video game La-Mulana.
- Chi You's clan became a group of priestess/assassin combo in Kingdom, where Qiang Lei was once part of.
- In the 1997 South Korean cartoon Mythology of Heaven by Lee Hyun-se, Chiyou appears as the protagonist in book two.
- The descendants of Chi You formed a warrior order named Saulabi in the novel of The God of High School.
- He is one of the kings represented by the members of the K-pop boy group Kingdom, as one of them is named "Chiwoo". His story is told in the album History of Kingdom: Part II. Chiwoo.
- He appears as a man-eating evil deity in the manga Record of Ragnarok.
- Chiyou appears in Marvel Comics as a major antagonist of the Chinese superhero Lin Lie and the patron god of Lie's archnemesis brother Lin Feng.
- In the mobile game Arknights, Superintendent Ch'en of the Lungmen Guard Department wields a "dragon-slaying" sword named Chi You.
- Appears as the primary antagonist of Assassin's Creed: Jade.
- In You Shou Yan, his tiger mount, Zhanhu, is a side character in the show and has mentioned his master before.
- In the video game Pokémon Scarlet and Violet, the legendary fire/dark type Pokémon Chi-Yu is named after Chiyou, with its fire typing alluding to Chiyu's lineage from the Flame Emperor, and its dark typing reflecting Chiyu's role as an adversary to the Yellow Emperor, in line with his antagonistic depiction in modern media.
- Chiyou as the primary antagonist of Age of Mythology Retold: The Immortal Pillars campaign.
- In the Chinese cultivation manhua Apotheosis, Chiyou appears as the grandfather of the main character, Luo Zheng.
- In the video game Nine Sols, Chi You appears as a war machine that achieved consciousness.

== See also ==
- Mogwai
- Ox-Head and Horse-Face
- Ox in Chinese mythology
- Zhuolu County
- Shennong clan

== Bibliography ==
- Michael J. Puett, The Ambivalence of Creation: Debates Concerning Innovation and Artifice in Early China. 2001
