= Color in Chinese culture =

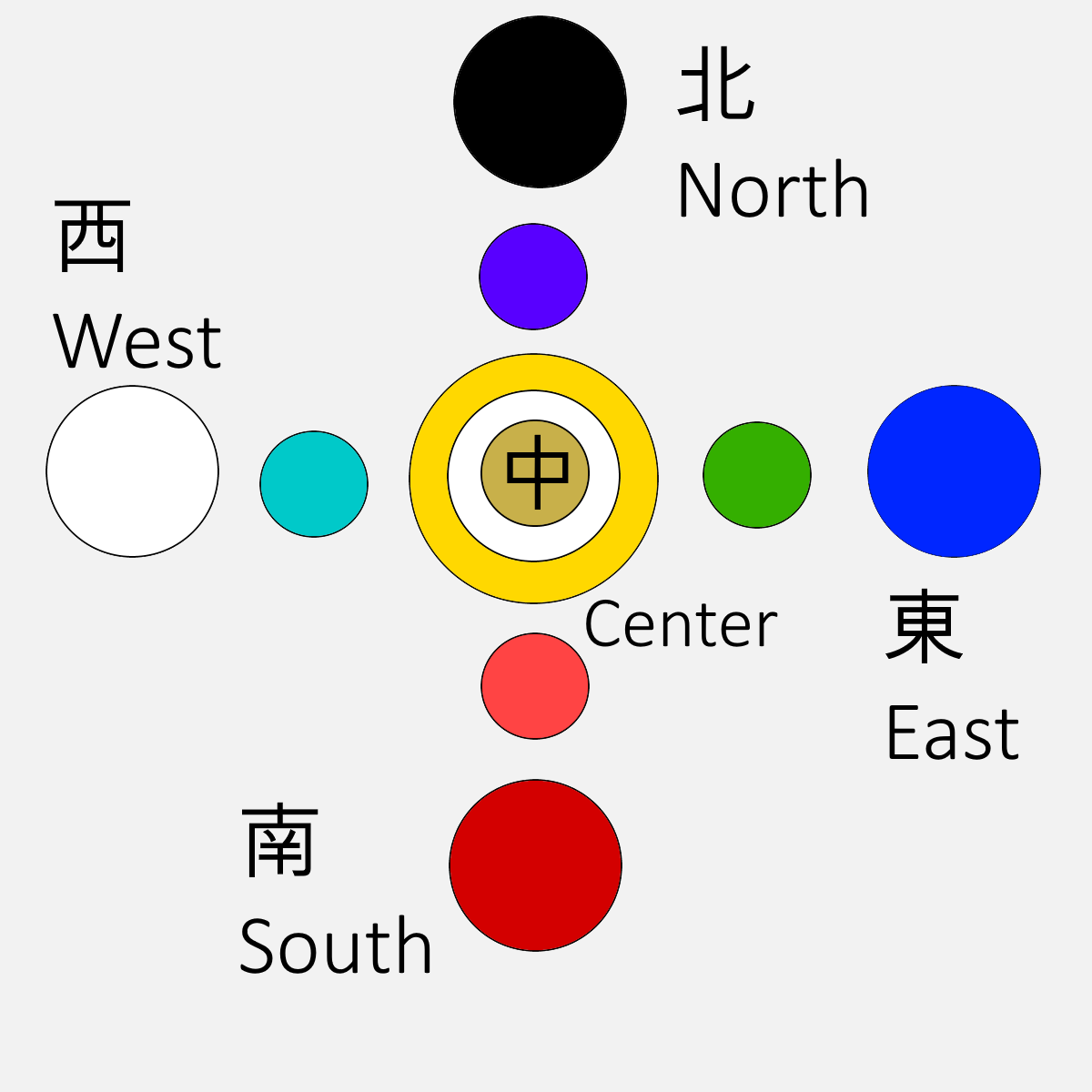
Chinese elementary and intermediary colors

Chinese culture attaches certain values to colors, such as considering some to be auspicious (吉利) or inauspicious (不利). The Chinese word for 'color' is yánsè (顏色). In Literary Chinese, the character 色 more literally corresponds to 'color in the face' or 'emotion'. It was generally used alone and often implied sexual desire or desirability. During the Tang dynasty (618–907), the word yánsè came to mean 'all color'. A Chinese idiom meaning 'multi-colored', Wǔyánliùsè (五顏六色), can also refer to 'colors' in general.

In Chinese mythology, the goddess Nüwa is said to have mended the Heavens after a disaster destroyed the original pillars that held up the skies, using five colored stones in the five auspicious colors to patch up the crumbling heavens, accounting for the many colors that the skies can take on.

== Wuxing ==
Traditionally, these colors are considered "cardinal colors"in Chinese culture: cyan (青; qīng, conventionally translated to "cyan", but can range from green to blue), red, yellow, white, and black. Respectively, these correspond to wood, fire, earth, metal, and water, which comprise the 'five elements' (wuxing) of traditional Chinese metaphysics. Throughout the Shang, Tang, Zhou and Qin dynasties, China's emperors used the Theory of the Five Elements to select colors. Other colors were considered by Confucius to be "inferior".

Element Qualities	Wood	Fire	Earth	Metal	Water
Elementary Color	Blue (Cyan)	Red	Yellow	White	Black
Intermediary Color	Green	Orange	Grey	Aquamarine	Purple
Direction	east	south	center	west	north
Planet	Jupiter	Mars	Saturn	Venus	Mercury
Heavenly creature	Azure Dragon	Vermilion Bird	Yellow Dragon	White Tiger	Black Turtle-Snake
Heavenly Stems	甲, 乙	丙, 丁	戊, 己	庚, 辛	壬, 癸
Wufang Shangdi	Cāngdì	Chide	Huangdi	Baidi	Heidi
Phase	New Yang	Full Yang	Balance	New Yin	Full Yin
Energy	Generative	Expansive	Stabilizing	Contracting	Conserving
Season	Spring	Summer	Change of seasons (Every third month)	Autumn	Winter
Climate	Windy	Hot	Damp	Dry	Cold
Development	Sprouting	Blooming	Ripening	Withering	Dormant
Livestock	dog	sheep, goat	cattle	chicken	pig
Fruit	Chinese plum	apricot	jujube	peach	Chinese chestnut
Grain	wheat	legume	rice	hemp	pearl millet

== Yellow ==
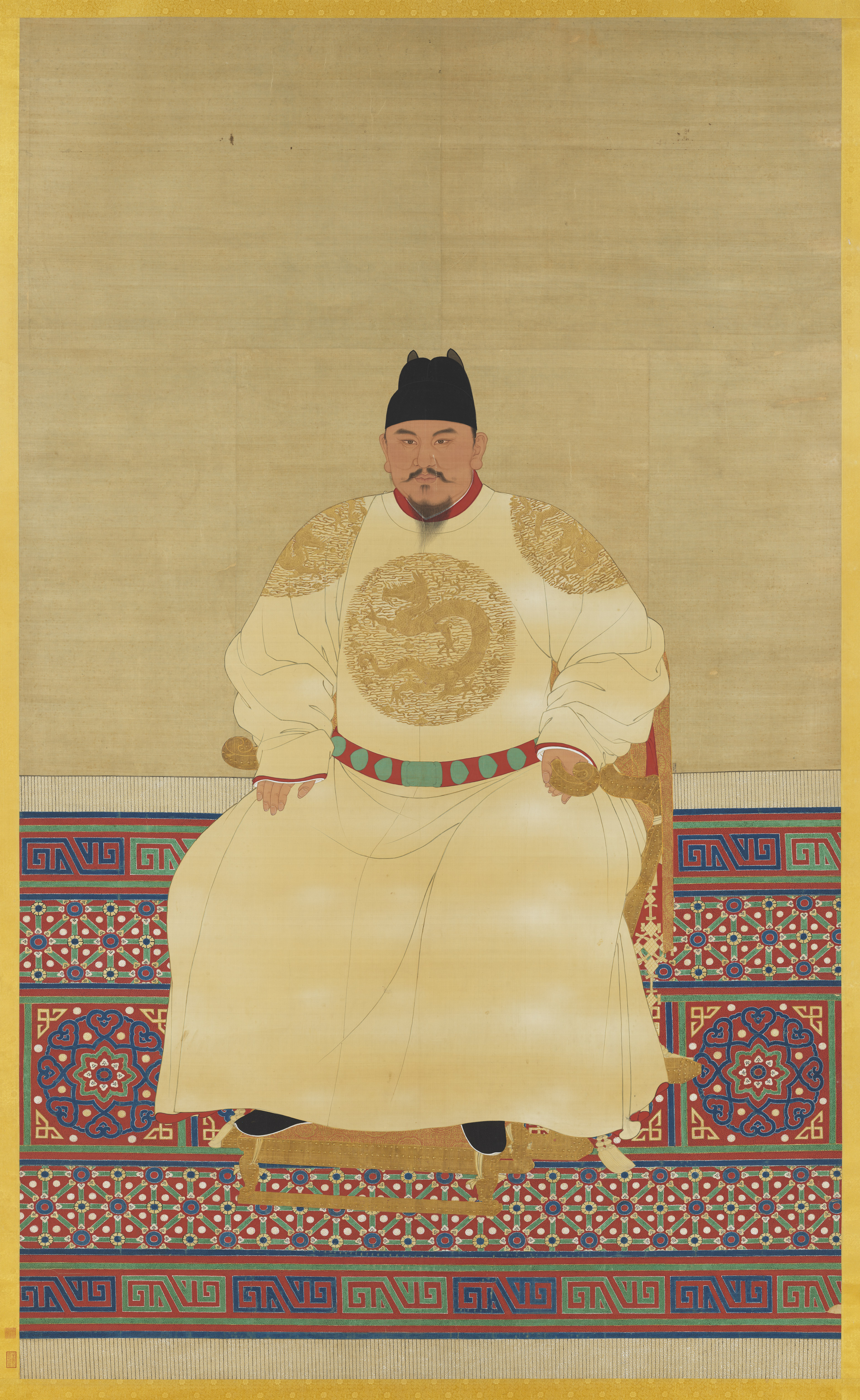
Portrait of the Hongwu Emperor in a silk yellow dragon robe embroidered with the Yellow Dragon

Yellow is considered the most beautiful and prestigious color. The Chinese conception of yellow (黃 huáng) is inclusive of many shades considered tan or brown in English, and its primary association is with the earth rather than the sun. It was formerly inclusive of many oranges, although speakers of modern Standard Mandarin increasingly map their use of huáng to shades corresponding to English yellow. The Chinese saying "Yellow generates yin and yang" implies that yellow is the center of everything. Associated with but ranked above brown, yellow signifies neutrality and good luck. Yellow is sometimes paired with red in place of gold.

The Yellow River is the cradle of Chinese civilization. In imperial China, yellow was the color of the emperor, and is held as the symbolic color of the five legendary emperors of ancient China, such as the Yellow Emperor. The Yellow Dragon is the zoomorphic incarnation of the Yellow Emperor of the center of the universe in Chinese religion and mythology. The flag of the Qing dynasty featured golden yellow as the background. The Plain Yellow Banner and the Bordered Yellow Banner were two of the upper three banners of Later Jin and Qing dynasty.

Yellow often decorates royal palaces, altars and temples, and the color was used in the dragon robes and attire of the emperors. It was a rare honor to receive the imperial yellow jacket.

Yellow also represents freedom from worldly cares and is thus esteemed in Buddhism. Monks' garments are yellow, as are elements of Buddhist temples. Yellow is also used as a mourning color for Chinese Buddhists.

Yellow is also symbolic of heroism, as opposed to the Western association of the color with cowardice.

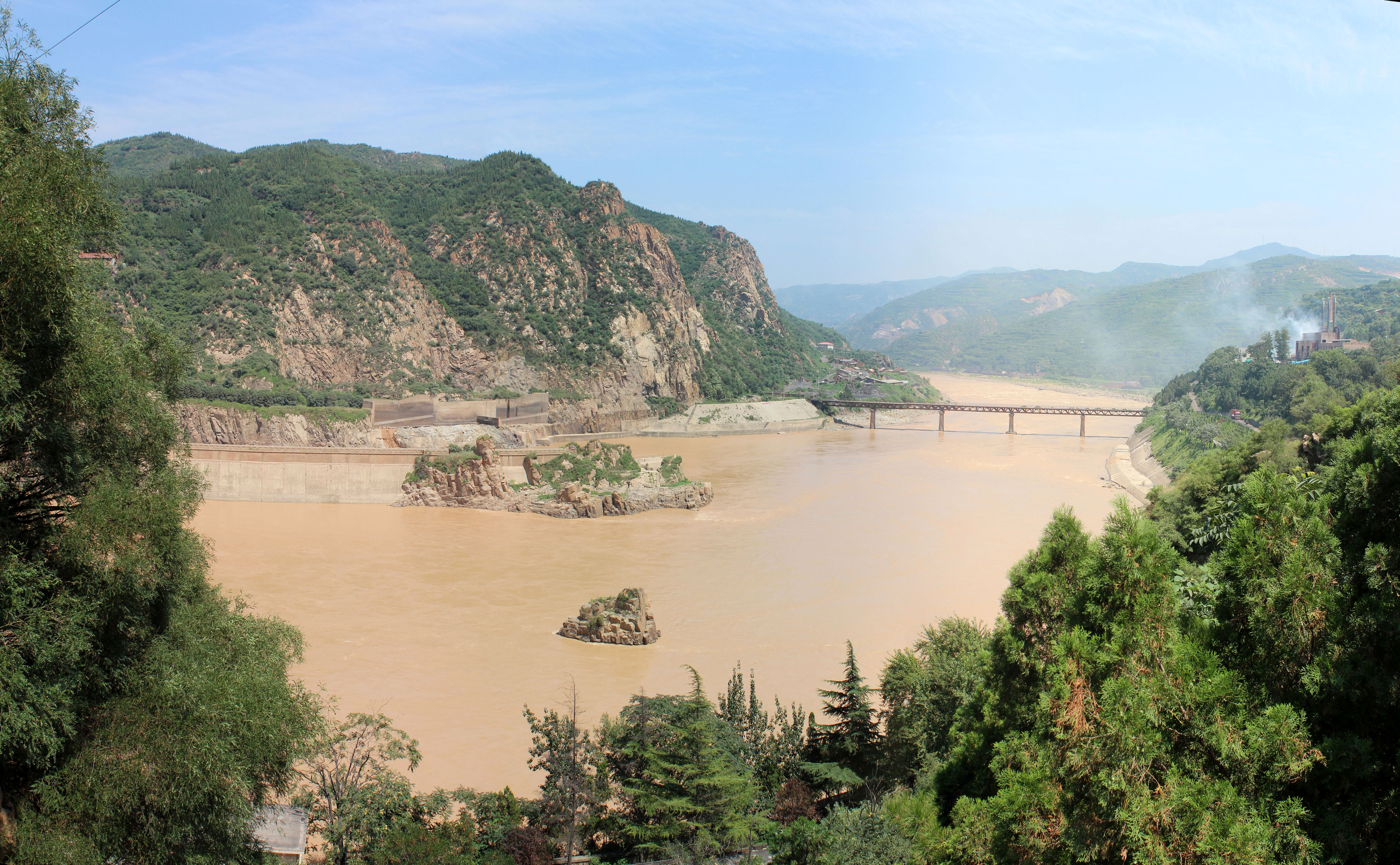
The Yellow River at Sanmenxia

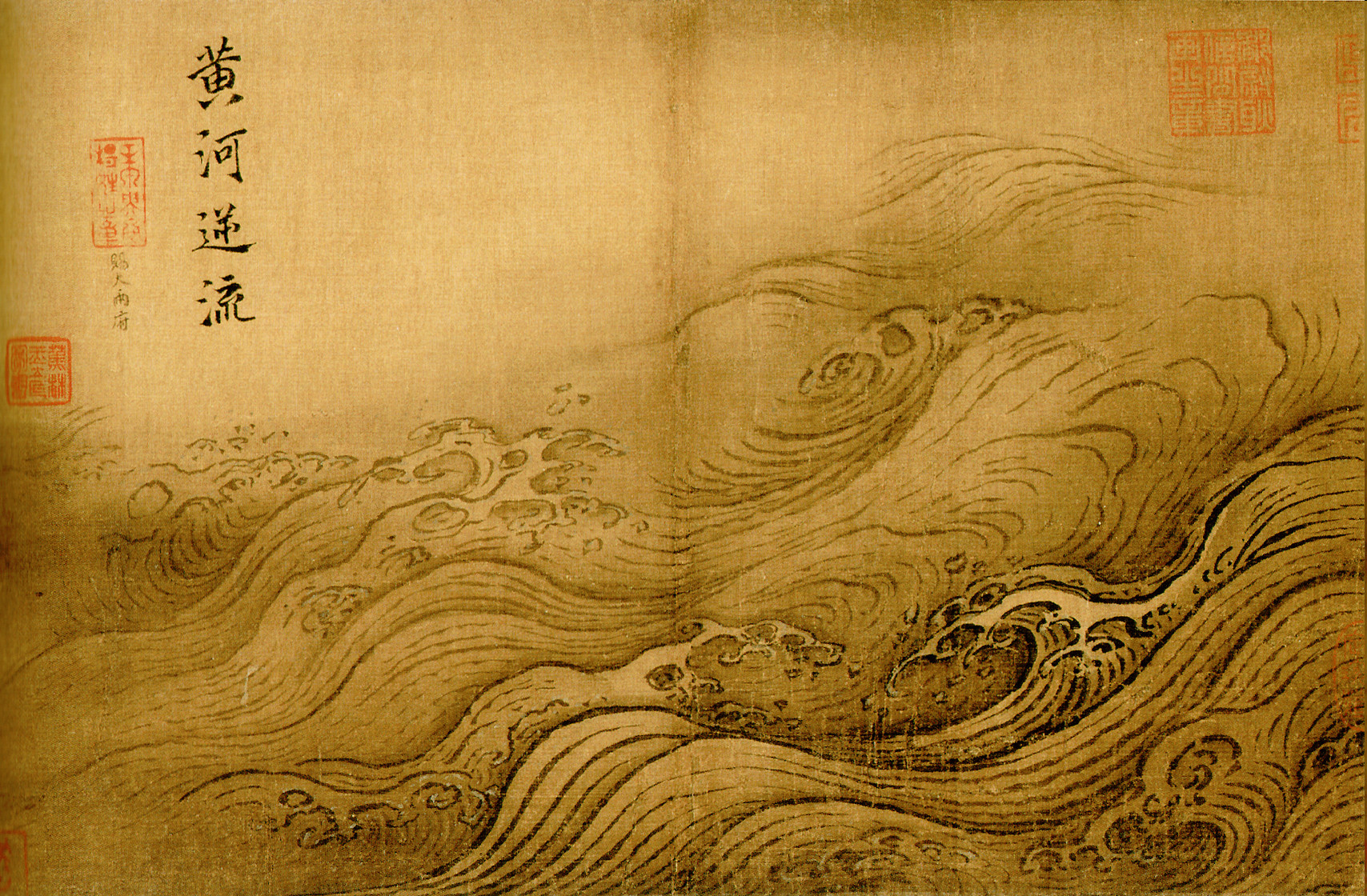
The Yellow River Breaches its Course by Ma Yuan (1160–1225), Song dynasty

The 1889–1912 flag of the Qing Empire

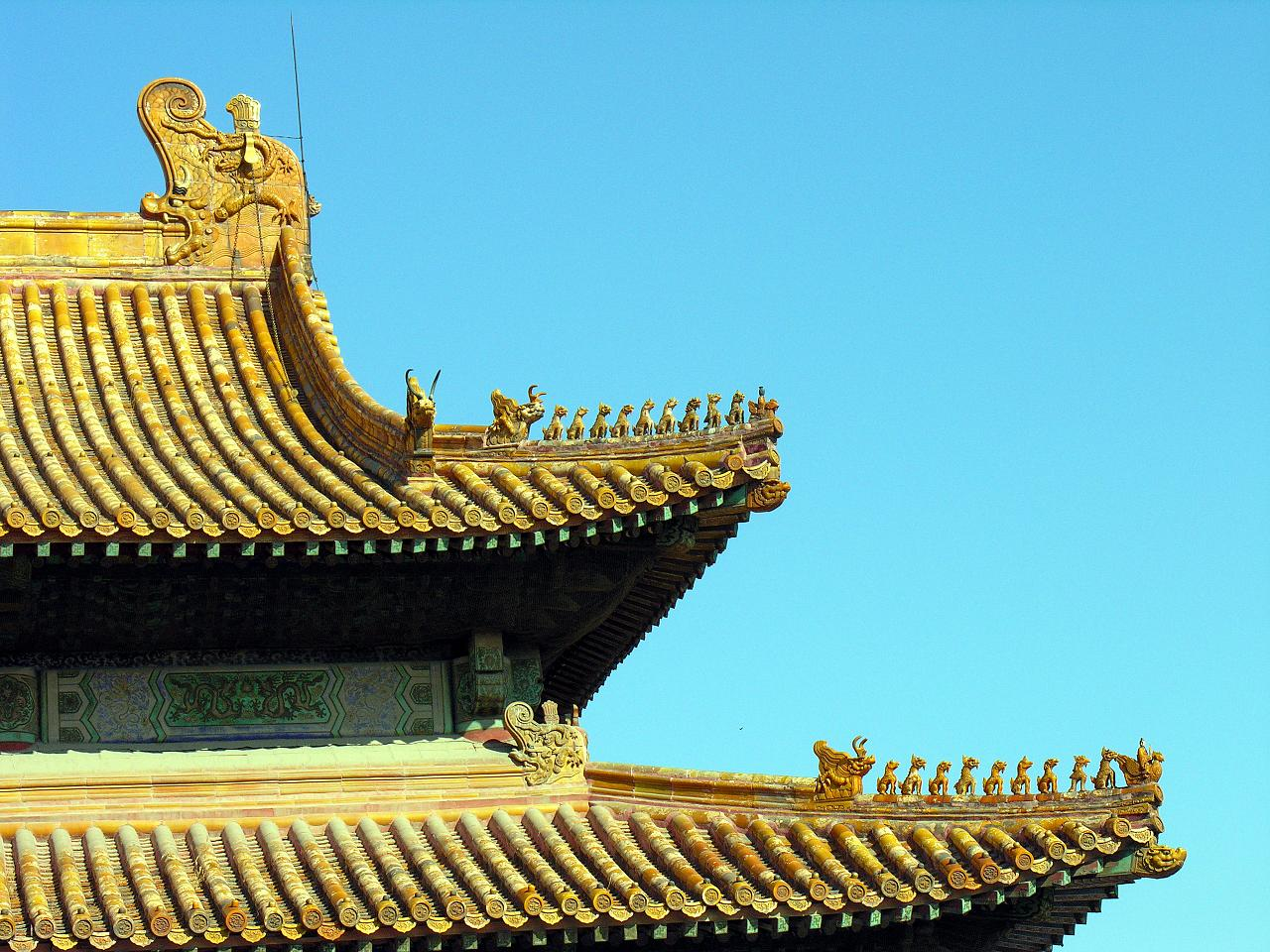
Yellow tiles and figures on the roof the Hall of Supreme Harmony in the Forbidden City

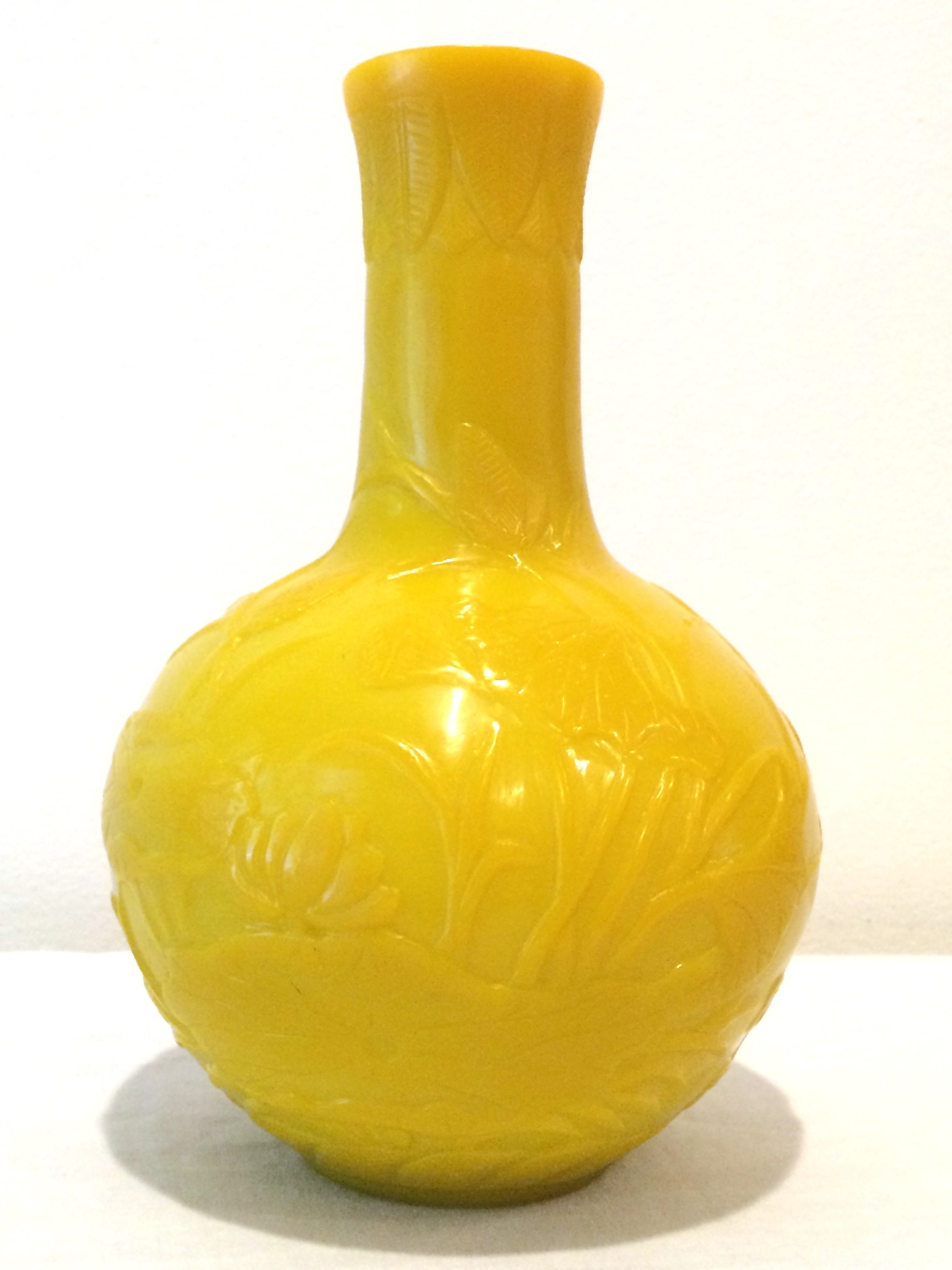
A Peking glass vase in Imperial Yellow, a shade of yellow so named for the banner of the Qing dynasty

== Black ==
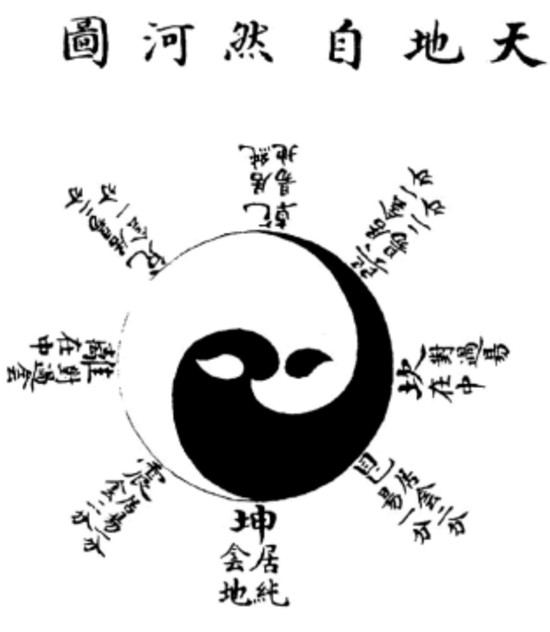
A black-and-white 18th-century representation of the Taijitu of Zhao Huiqian (1370s)

Black (黑 hēi), corresponding to water, it is generally understood as a neutral color, though it appears in many negative contexts in chengyu and common names. "Black cult" (黑幫 hēibāng) is the usual name for Chinese organized crime and the Thick Black Theory of the late Qing intellectual Li Zongwu (李宗吾, 1879–1943) is an exhortation to opportunism. In modern China, black is used in clothing, especially in professional contexts. Black has less association with mourning than white in traditional Chinese culture. Formal black jackets and slacks have become associated with international professionalism.

The I Ching regards black as Heaven's color. The saying "heaven and earth are black" was rooted in the observation that the northern sky was black. Ancient Chinese people believed Tiandi resided in the North Star. The taijitu uses black and white or red to represent the unity of yin and yang. Ancient Chinese people regarded black as the king of colors and honored black more consistently than any other color. Laozi said "know the white, keep the black", and Taoists believe black is the color of the Tao.

== White ==
White (白, bái) corresponds with metal among the wuxing and represents, transparency through to gold. It symbolizes brightness, purity, and clarity.

White is also the traditional color of mourning. Death rituals are "white affairs" (Baishi 白事). White is the color of yin force and traditionally associated with ghosts.

Ever since the reform and opening up and influx of Western cultural values, white wedding gowns have become more popular.

== Red ==
Red (紅; 红 hóng), vermilion (丹 dān), and scarlet (赤 chì) are associated with good fortune, wealth, happiness, masculine yang energy, and fire. Red is the traditional color used during Chinese New Year and other celebrations. It is frequently used in weddings and wedding gowns. Chinese reds are traditionally inclusive of shades that may be considered as orange or warm brown in English.

Writing in red ink was traditionally exclusive to an emperor's comments added to memorials. Writing someone's name in red ink is a traditional taboo.

A hongbao, a red envelope stuffed with money, now frequently red 100 RMB notes, is the usual gift in Chinese communities for Chinese New Year, birthdays, marriages, bribes, and other special occasions. The red color of the packet symbolizes good luck. Red is strictly forbidden at funerals as it is traditionally symbolic of happiness.

In the People's Republic of China, red remains a very popular color and is affiliated with and used by the Communist Party and the government.

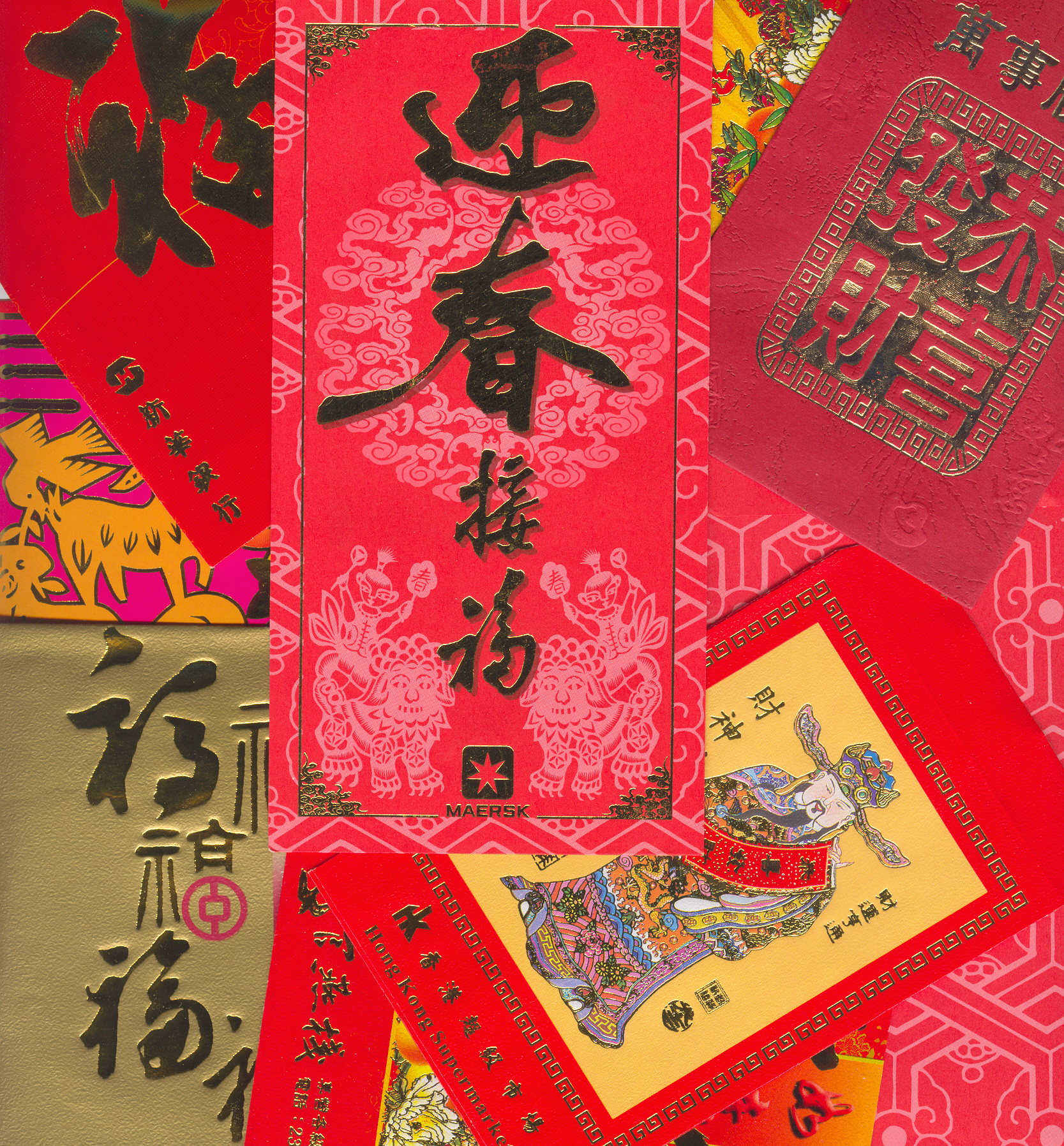
Contemporary red envelopes

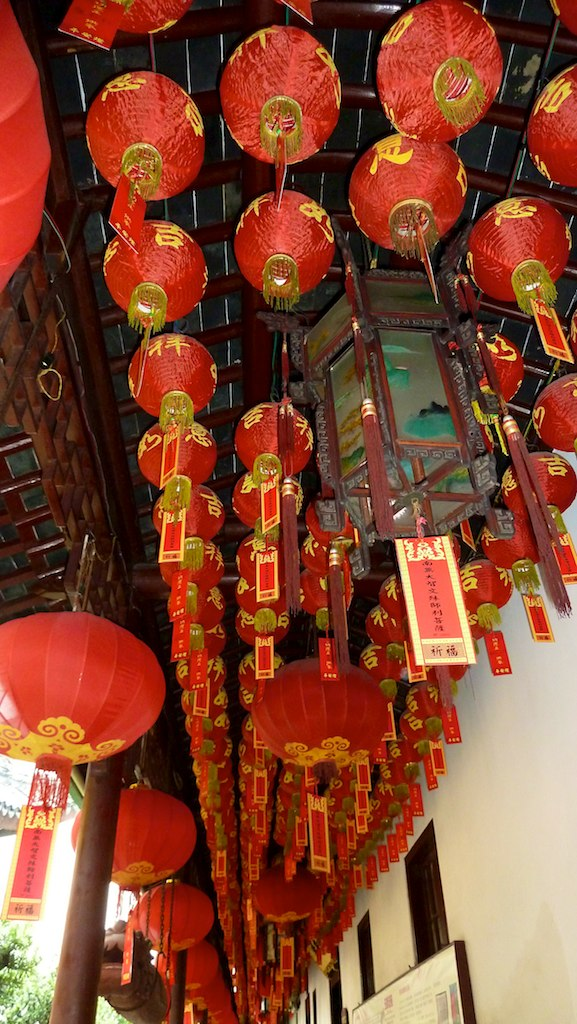
Red paper lanterns for sale in Shanghai. The color red symbolizes luck and is believed to ward away evil.

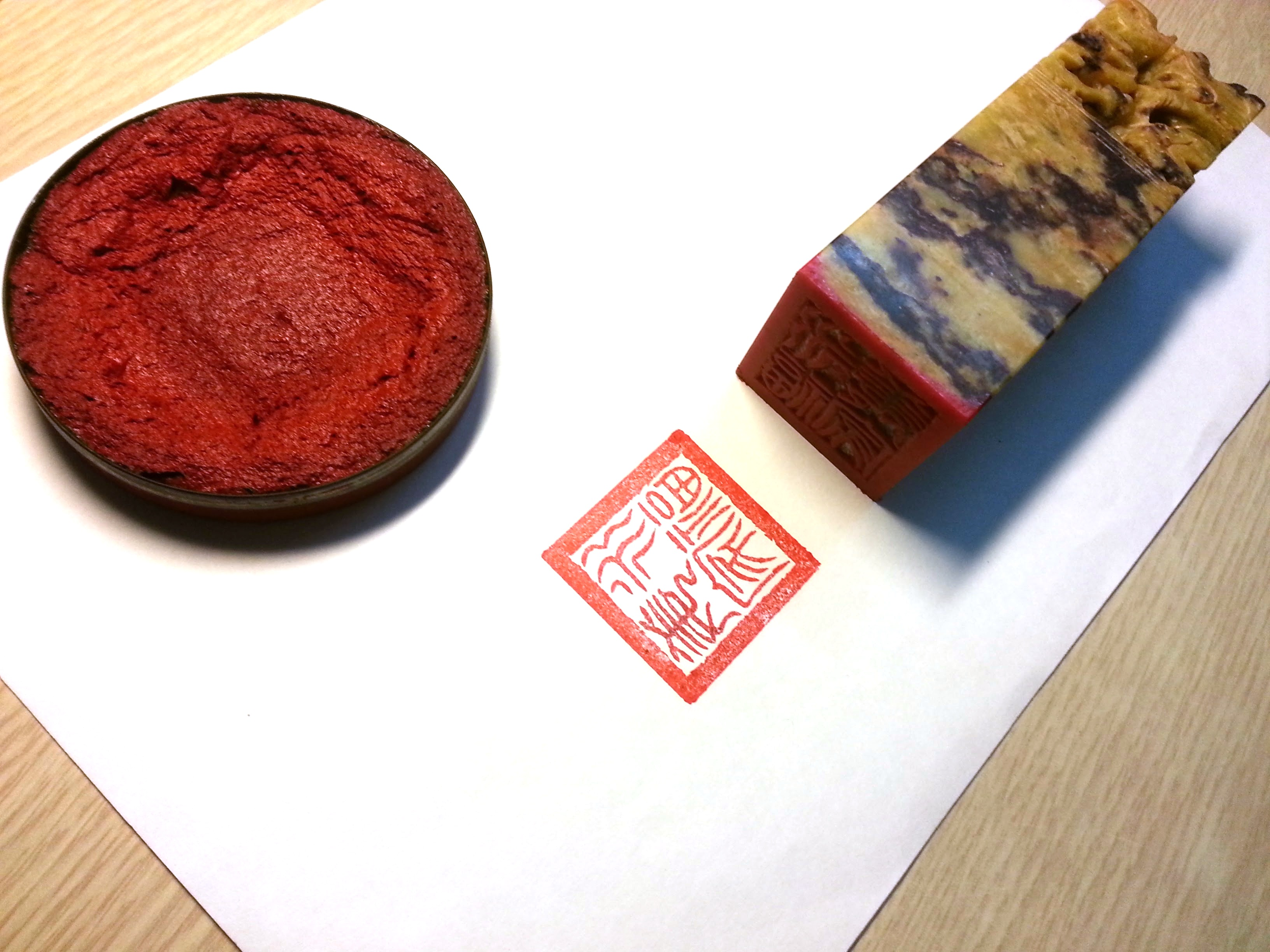
Chinese seal and red seal paste

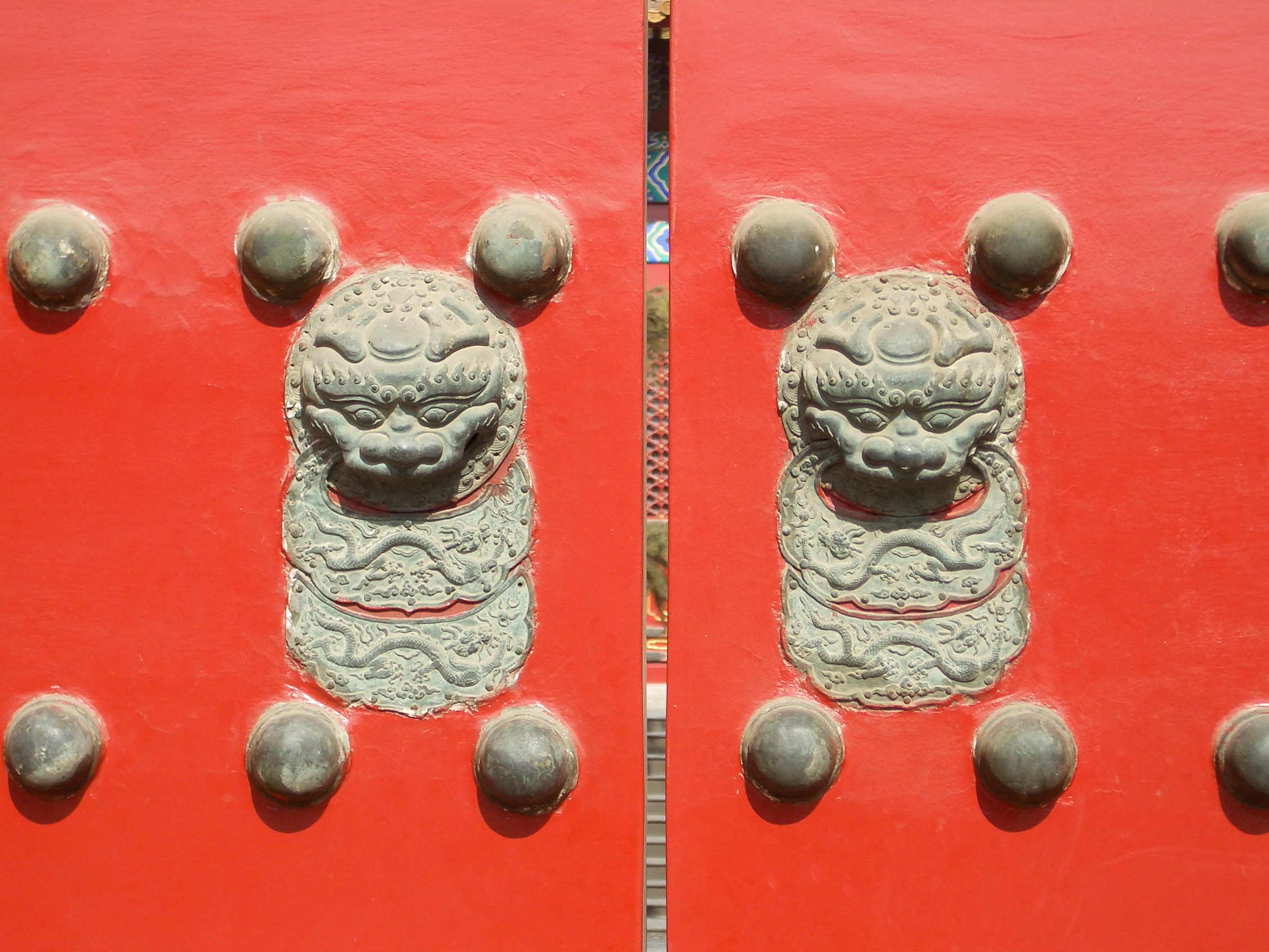
One of the red gates to the Forbidden City

== Blue and green ==
Old Chinese did not make a blue-green distinction, having a single verdant color (青, qīng) that encompassed both. The blue sky and green vegetables were considered shades of a single color which could even include black as its darkest hue in some contexts. Modern Standard Mandarin makes the blue-green distinction using lǜ (綠; 绿 'leafy') for green and lán (藍; 蓝 'indigo') for blue.

Qīng was associated with health, prosperity, and harmony. It was used for the roof tiles and ornate interior of the Temple of Heaven and in other structures to represent Heaven. It is also the color of most jade as well as the greenware pottery that was developed to imitate it.

Separately, green hats are associated with infidelity and used as an idiom for a cuckold. In modern scientific contexts, qīng refers to cyan as a narrow range of color in between blue and green, and the modern color names are used when referring to other shades of blue or of green.

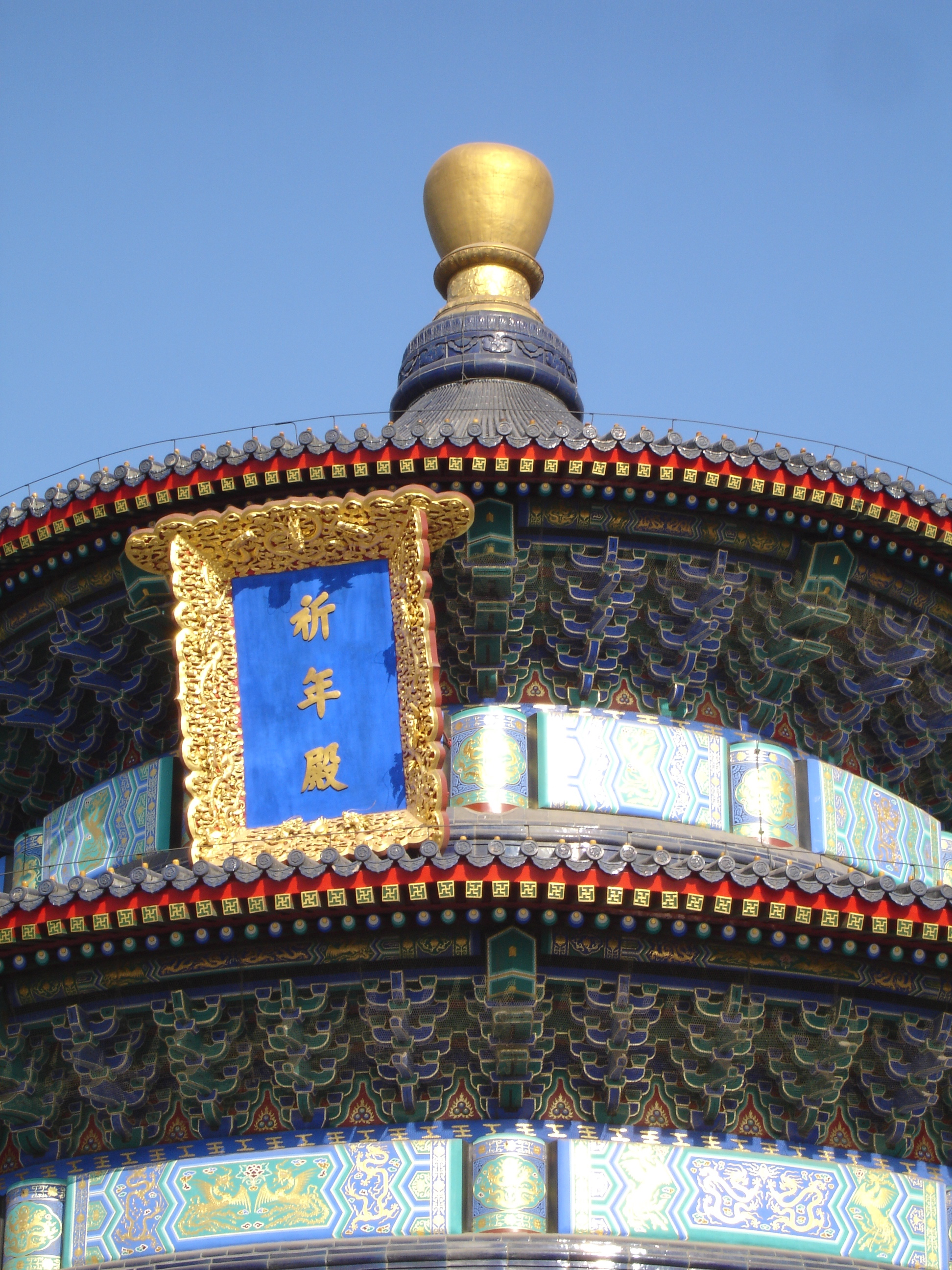
Azure roof structure and name plaque of the Temple of Heaven

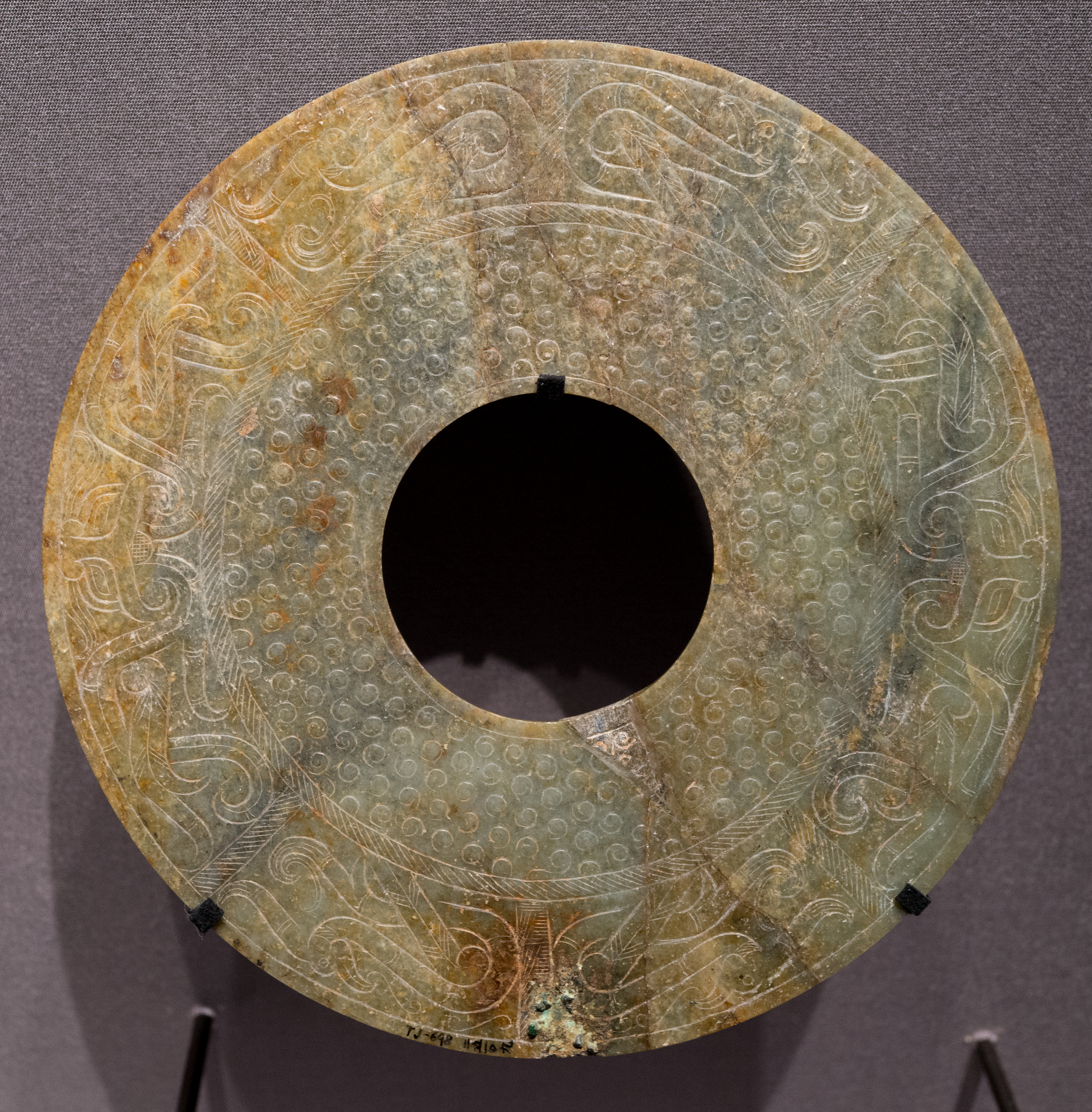
A Western Han dynasty green jade Bi disk, with dragon designs

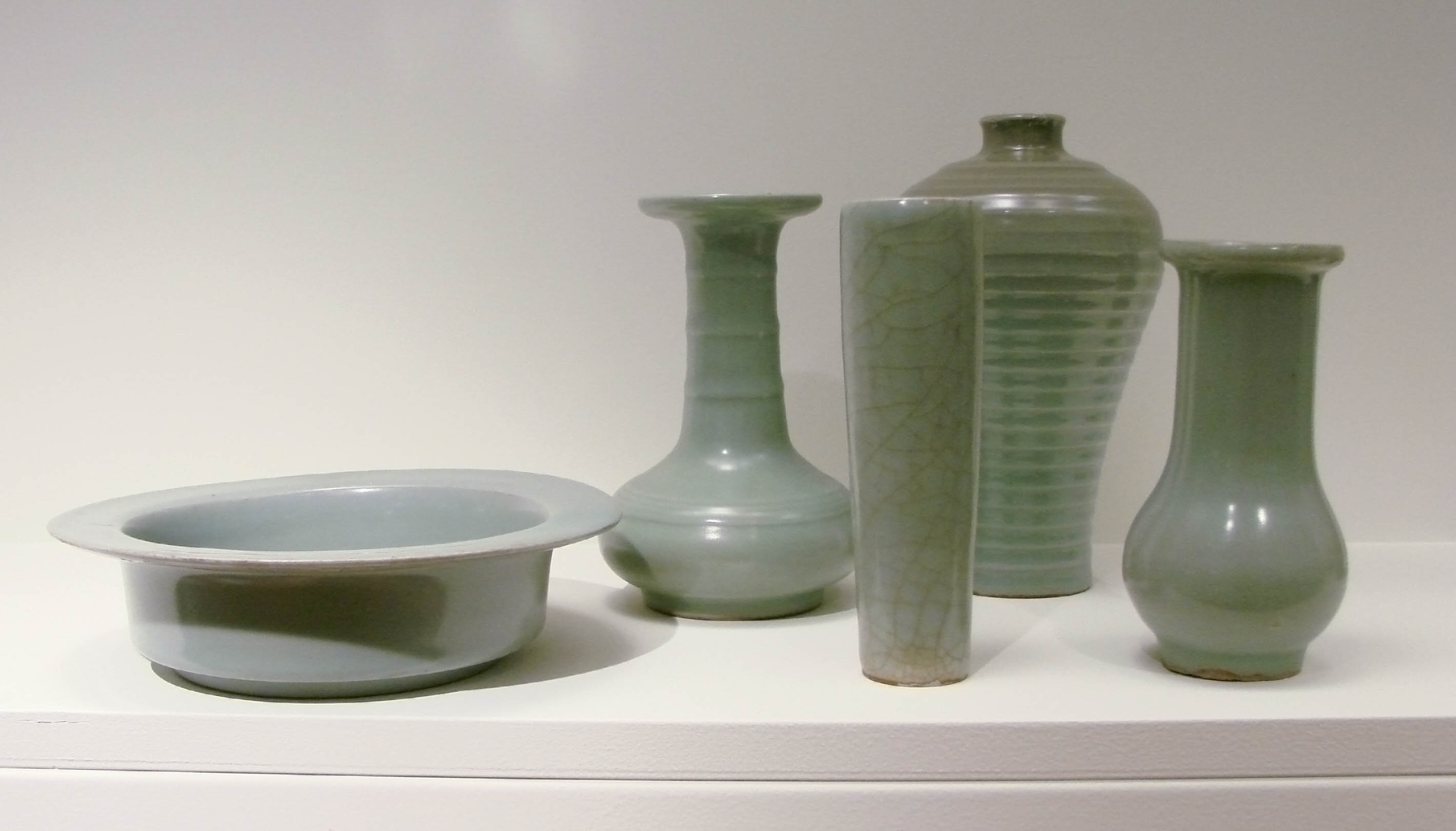
Green Longquan celadon from Zhejiang, Song dynasty, 13th century

== Intermediary colors ==
The five intermediary colors (五間色 wǔjiànsè) are formed as combinations of the five elementary colors. These are:

- 綠 lǜ 'green': The intermediary color of the east, combination of central yellow and eastern blue
- 粉紅 fěnhóng 'light red': The intermediary color of the south, combination of western white and southern red
- 碧 bì 'emerald blue': The intermediary color of the west, combination of eastern blue and western white
- 紫 zǐ 'violet': The intermediary color of the north, combination of southern red and northern black
- 駵黄 liúhuáng 'horse-brown': The intermediary color of the center, combination of northern black and central yellow

== See also ==
- Chinese art
- Culture of China
- Culture of the People's Republic of China
- Fashion of China
- Haint blue
- Luck
- Numbers in Chinese culture
- Jing (Chinese opera)#Face design for information on color in Chinese opera face paintings
- Four Symbols
- Wufang Shangdi
- Obangsaek for the five elementary colors (五方色 wǔfāngsè)
