= Blue emperor =

Blue emperor may refer to

- Anax imperator, a hawker dragonfly found in Europe and nearby Africa and Asia
- Papilio ulysses, a metallic blue butterfly endemic to New Guinea
- Qīngdì (青帝 "Blue Emperor"), the east and spring aspect of the Wufang Shangdi
