= Dongyue =

Dongyue may refer to:

- Dongyue, Henan, a town in Xi County, Henan, China
- Dongyue, Hongya County, a town in Hongya County, Sichuan, China
- Dongyue Township, Shehong County, a township in Shehong County, Sichuan, China
- Dongyue Township, Guang'an, a township in Guang'an, Sichuan, China
- Dongyue Township, Dazhou, a township in Dazhou, Sichuan, China
- Dongyue Subdistrict, a subdistrict in Longwen District, Zhangzhou, Fujian, China

== See also ==
- Dongyue Temple (disambiguation)
- Dongyue Emperor
- Mount Tai, a mountain in Shandong, China, traditionally known as Dongyue
