= Cangdi =

Chinese deity, member of the Wufang Shangdi

- Diagram of the Wufang Shangdi
- Major cult centre: Mount Tai
- Predecessor: Heidi (Wuxing cycle)
- Successor: Chidi (Wuxing cycle)
- Planet: Jupiter
- Consort: Bixia

Cāngdì (Chinese: 蒼帝) of pinyin: Dōngyuèdàdì (Chinese: 东岳大帝; trans. "Great Deity of the Eastern Peak") is the manifestation of the supreme God associated with the essence of wood and spring, for which he is worshipped as the god of fertility. The "Blue Dragon" (青龙; Qīnglóng) is both his animal form and constellation, and as a human, he was Tàihào 太昊 (Fu Xi). His female consort is the goddess of fertility Bixia. His astral body is Jupiter.

== Names ==
Cāngdì (蒼帝; "Green Deity" or "Green Emperor") goes by several other names, such as Cāngshén (蒼神; "Green God"), also known as Qīngdì (青帝; "Blue Deity" or "Blue Emperor") or Qīngshén (青神; "Blue God"), and cosmologically as the Dōngdì (东帝; "East Deity") or Dōngyuèdàdì (东岳大帝; "Great Deity of the Eastern Peak").

== Overview ==
The Confucian text, the Rites of Zhou, discusses the concept of the so-called "Wufang Shangdi". The History, quoted in the Kokuyo, refers to the following: Cangdi (or Qingdi), Huangdi, Heidi, Chidi, and Baidi. The names of the five emperors are not specified in the literature. The name of the Green Emperor is judged to be "Ling Wei Yang".

== Dongyue Emperor ==
Cangdi
- Chinese: 東嶽大帝
- Simplified Chinese: 东岳大帝
Transcriptions

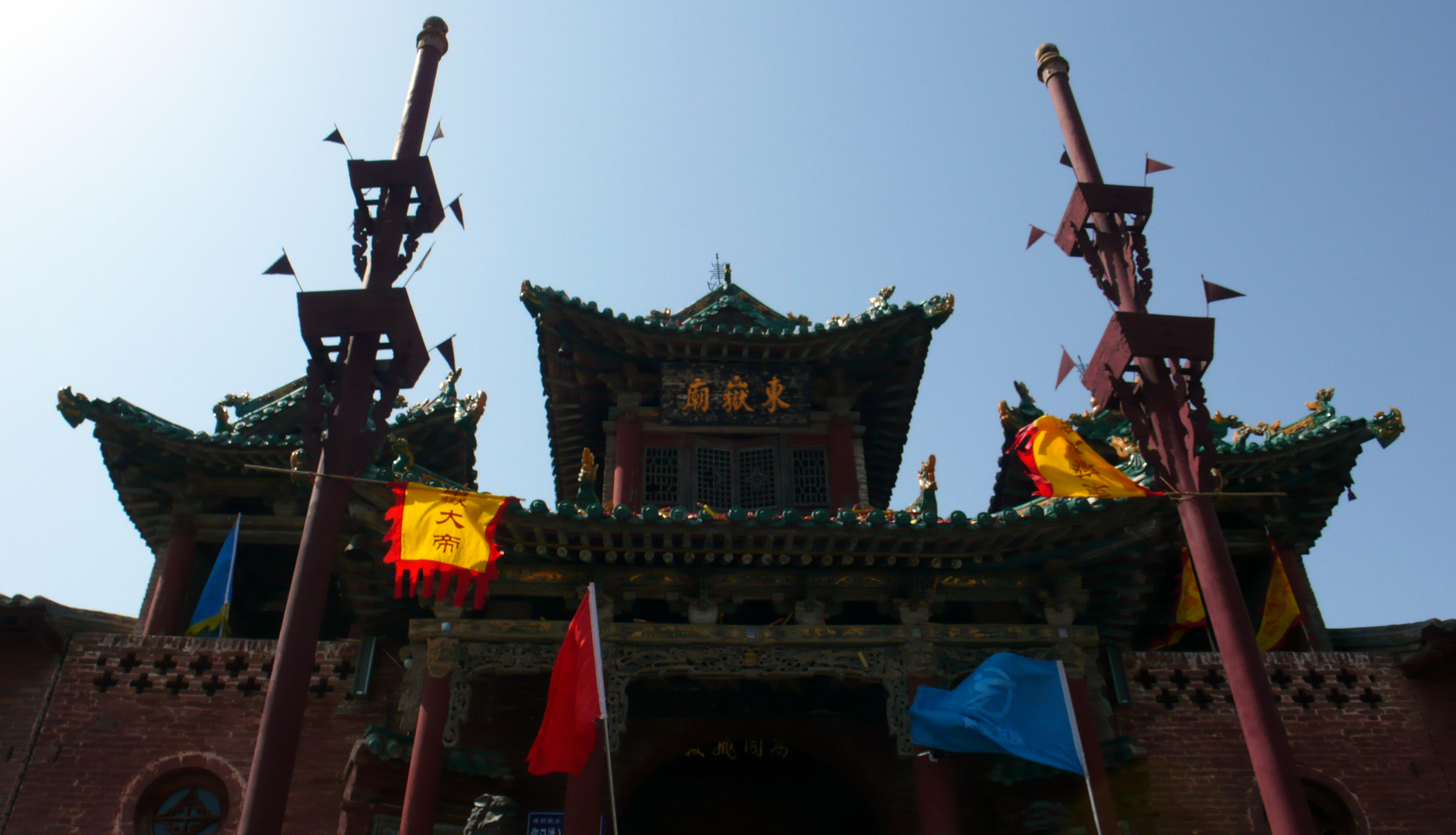
Temple of the Eastern Peak of Baishan, in Pu, Linfen, Shanxi.

As Dōngyuèdàdì (东岳大帝 "Great Deity of the Eastern Peak", which is Mount Tai), Cangdi is worshipped as a Daoist deity of the sacred mountain Mount Tai. He is also considered significant in Chinese Buddhism.

Since ancient times, Mount Tai has been seen as a place where the spirits of the dead gather, so the god of Mount Tai was thought to be the supreme deity of the underworld and governs the lifespan and status of humans in this world. In Daoism, it is often said that he is the grandson of the Jade Emperor.

During the Han dynasty, Emperors performed the Feng Shan ceremony on Mount Tai. At this time, the ceremony was considered highly important and completing Feng Shan allowed the emperor to receive the mandate of heaven. It was started in 219 BC, by Qin Shihuang, after unifying China.

Over time, the role of the Dongyue Emperor expanded, moving from a local deity to a deity associated with life and death as a whole.

The ritual of the storming of the city (打城) is performed in Taiwan and associated Dongyue Emperor, demonstrating this shift.

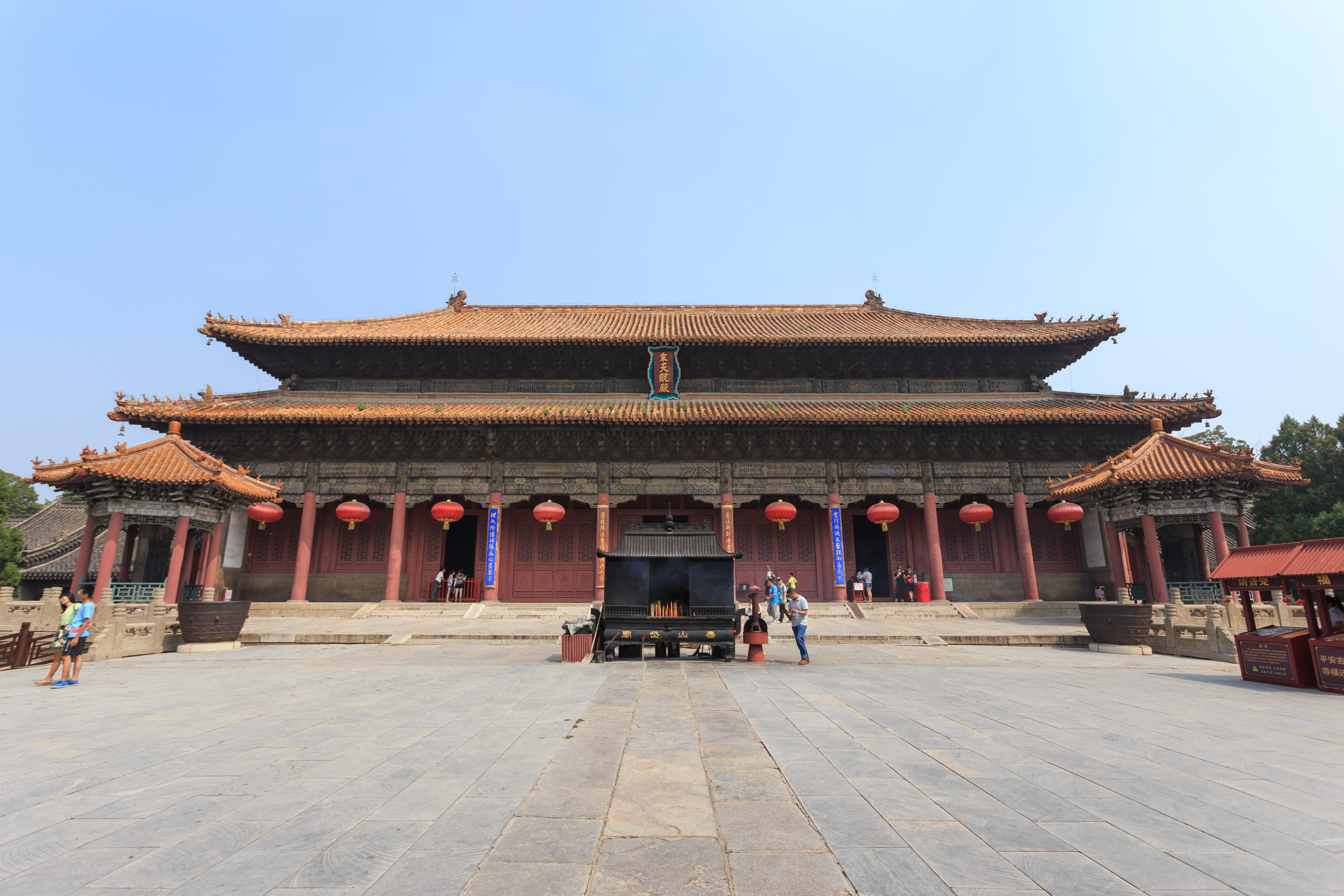
Main hall of the Dai Temple (岱庙; Dàimiào) at Mount Tai. As the major one of the Eastern Peak Temples, dedicated to the Blue Deity, the spring aspect of the Highest Deity, identified with Jupiter, it has been a site of fire sacrifice to Di since prehistoric times. Mount Tai is the holiest of China's sacred mountains. According to mythology, it formed from Pangu's head after his body's dissection.

== Literature ==
=== The Beginning of the Ji Zhou Period ===
The Etiquette and Ceremonial notes state that Jiang Shu, a later concubine of Emperor Xuan, became pregnant when she stepped on the giant footprints of Emperor Qing and gave birth to Huji, who became the founder of the Zhou dynasty.

== See also ==
- Taihao
- Wufang Shangdi
- Dongyue Emperor
- Mount Tai
- Feng Shan
- Mount Tai
- Dongyue Temple
- King Father of the East
- Yanluo Wang
