= Wudaxian =

Deities in northeastern Chinese religion

Five Great Immortals
- Cosmological diagram of the Five Great Immortals
- Simplified Chinese: 五大仙
Transcriptions
Standard Mandarin
- Hanyu Pinyin: Wǔdàxiān
- Wade–Giles: Wu Ta Hsien

The Wǔdàxiān (五大仙 "Five Great Immortals"), also known as Wǔdàjiā (五大家) and Wǔdàmén (五大门), meaning the "Five Great Genii", (Note: Etymologically the Latin word genius has the same derivation as nature from gēns (“tribe”, “people”) from the Indo-European root *gen-, "produce." Literally, the Chinese concept of 家 jia means a "family" in the sense of a category of beings produced by the same god, and 门 men, "gateway", in this context means the same thing by metaphor.) are a group of five zoomorphic deities of northeastern Chinese religion, and important to local shamanic practices. They are the localised adaptation of the Five Forms of the Highest Deity (五方上帝 Wǔfāng Shàngdì) of common Chinese theology.

== Names and meanings ==
In some places of Hebei, the cult comprises four instead of five zoomorphic gods, including the Fox, the Weasel, the Hedgehog and the Snake Gods (四大仙 Sìdàxiān, 四大门 Sìdàmén). While the Fox God and the Weasel God always remain the two prominent members of the cult, the other positions vary in some regions including the Tiger, the Wolf, the Hare and the Turtle Gods.

Li Qingchen (?-1897), a scholar of Tianjin, explained the images of the Five Great Immortals as follows:

[...] the Five Immortals [...] are: 狐 Hú is fox, 黄 Huáng is weasel, 白 Bái is hedgehog, 柳 Liǔ is snake and 灰 Huī is rat. I said these five can be distinguished by five colors. [...] White and yellow are hedgehog's and weasel's original colors, Huī is black and Liǔ is green. [...] The Ode of Songs reads: "Nothing is redder than fox".

As gods of wealth, the Five Immortals are also known by the epithet of "Little Wealth Gods" (小财神 Xiǎocáishén). The Five Immortals have both male and female form, usually represented twosomes.

=== Huxian—Fox Immortal ===
Húxiān (狐仙=胡仙 "Fox Immortal"), also called Húshén (狐神=胡神 "Fox God") or Húwáng (狐王=胡王 "Fox Ruler") is possibly the most important of the Five Immortals in northeast China. Nagao Ryuzō, a Japanese sinologist, observed that the Fox Gods "enjoy such popularity to be worshipped by almost every household in north China and Manchuria". Henry Doré documented the worship of the Fox God in the northern parts of Jiangsu and Anhui. In parts of Hebei, to every newborn is assigned his own běnshén (本神 patron god) manifestation of Huxian, usually a female for a boy and a male for a girl. After these boys and girls get married, their patrons will be represented sitting together. In his survey of popular shrines and temples in Manchuria, Takizawa Shunryō found the number dedicated to Fox Gods overwhelming.

The deity can be represented as either male or female, but is most frequently identified as the female Húxiān Niángniáng (狐仙娘娘 "Fox Immortal Lady") whose animal form is a nine-tailed fox. She is the Chinese equivalent of the Japanese Shintō cult of Inari Ōkami, both god(desses) of the foxes or collective representations of the fox sprites.

The fox deity is also represented as a couple of gods, male and female, called the Great Lord of the Three Foxes (胡三太爷 Húsān Tàiyé) and the Great Lady of the Three Foxes (胡三太奶 Húsān Tàinǎi). As a goddess, the Fox Immortal is related to Xīwángmǔ (西王母 "Queen Mother of the West"), the great goddess guardian of Mount Kunlun (axis mundi).

=== Huangxian—Weasel Immortal ===
Huángxiān (黃仙 literally "Yellow Immortal") is the Weasel God, and is identified as an incarnation of the pan-Chinese Yellow Deity (黄帝 Huángdì) and Huáng Dàxiān (黄大仙 "Great Yellow Immortal"). Another name which indicates the collective personification of weasels is "Great Lord of the Two Yellows" (黄二太爷 Huángèr Tàiyé).

=== Shexian—Snake Immortal ===
The Snake God is either called Shéxiān (蛇仙 literally "Snake Immortal"), Liǔxiān (柳仙 "Immortal Liu"), or Chángxiān (常仙 "Viper Immortal"). Alternatively he is Mǎngxiān (蟒仙 "Python (or Boa) Immortal"). Considered an incarnation of the Dragon God, the snake traditionally represents generation and activity (yang). As such, it is also associated to Fuxi and Nüwa, respectively the snake-bodied patron of heaven (天皇 Tiānhuáng) and patroness of earth (地皇 Dehuáng), who represent the two forces who concur in the birth of things.

=== Baixian—Hedgehog Immortal ===
The Báixiān (白仙 "White Immortal") is the Hedgehog God. He is primarily worshipped as a medical deity to prevent and cure diseases. One of his female forms is Báilǎo Tàitài (白老太太 "White Old Lady").

=== Heixian—Crow Immortal ===
The Hēixiān (黑仙 "Black Immortal") is a function occupied by different zoomorphic deities. The most common one is the Wūyāxiān (乌鸦仙 "Crow Immortal") and another popular one is the Huīxiān (灰仙 "Rat Immortal"), although the latter is said to be a misinterpretation of the former. The position can be taken also by the Lángshén (狼神 "Wolf God").

== See also ==
- Chinese theology
- Northeast China folk religion
- Wufang Shangdi
