= Taibai Jinxing =

Deity in Chinese folk religion and Taoism

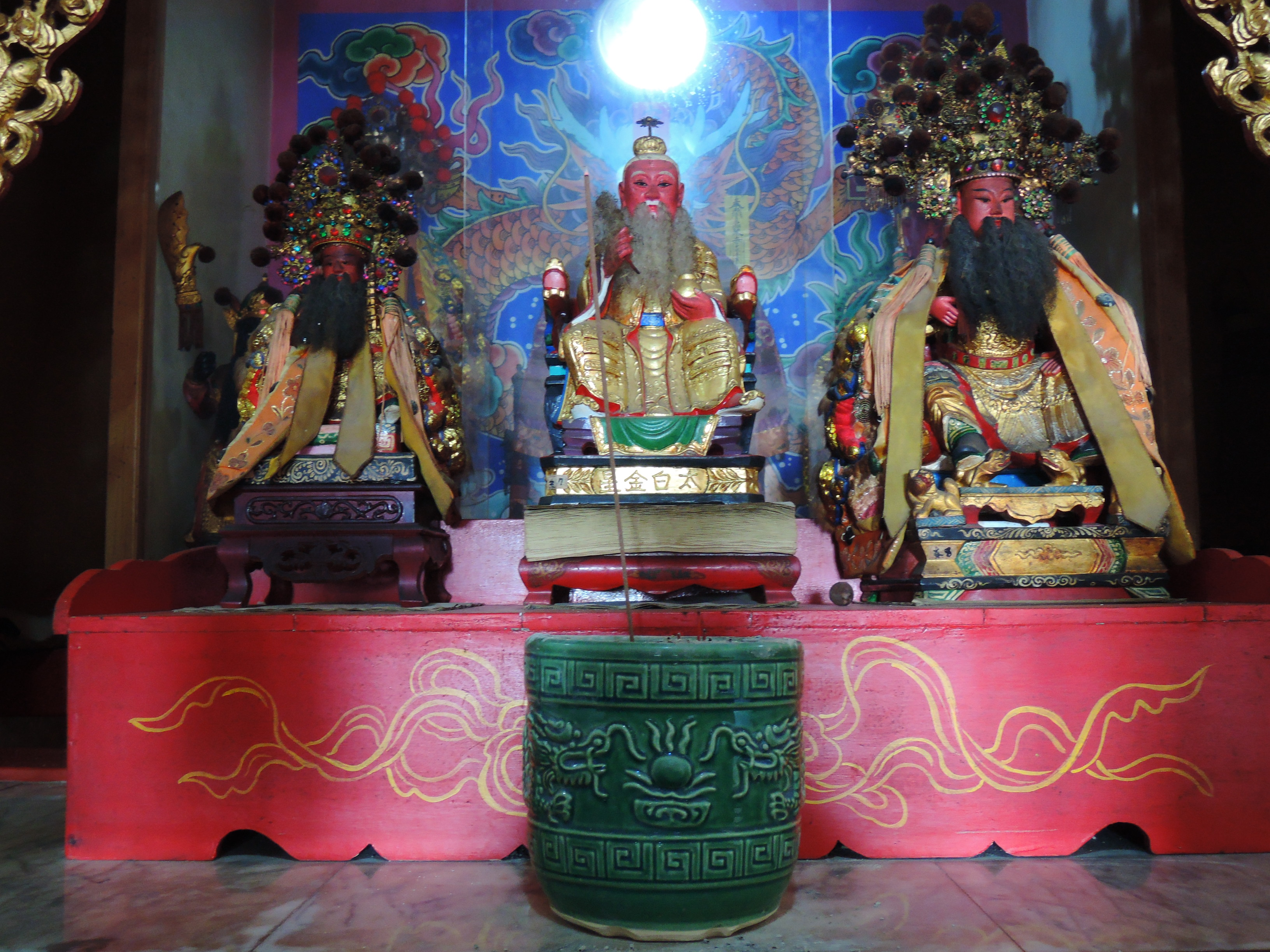
- Statue Of Taibai Jinxing (middle) in Tàibáidiàn (太白殿) Huxi, Penghu Taiwan
- Planet: Venus

Genealogy
- Parents: Baidi (father)

Taibai Jinxing (Chinese: 太白金星; pinyin: Tàibái Jīnxīng; lit. 'Great White Golden Star') is a deity in Chinese folk religion and Taoism. He is the son of Bai Di, the White Emperor, and his name means 'Evening Star'. The Fengshen Yanyi refers to him as an aide in the entourage of the Jade Emperor. In Chinese astronomy, Taibai Jinxing is the name for Venus.

== Legends ==
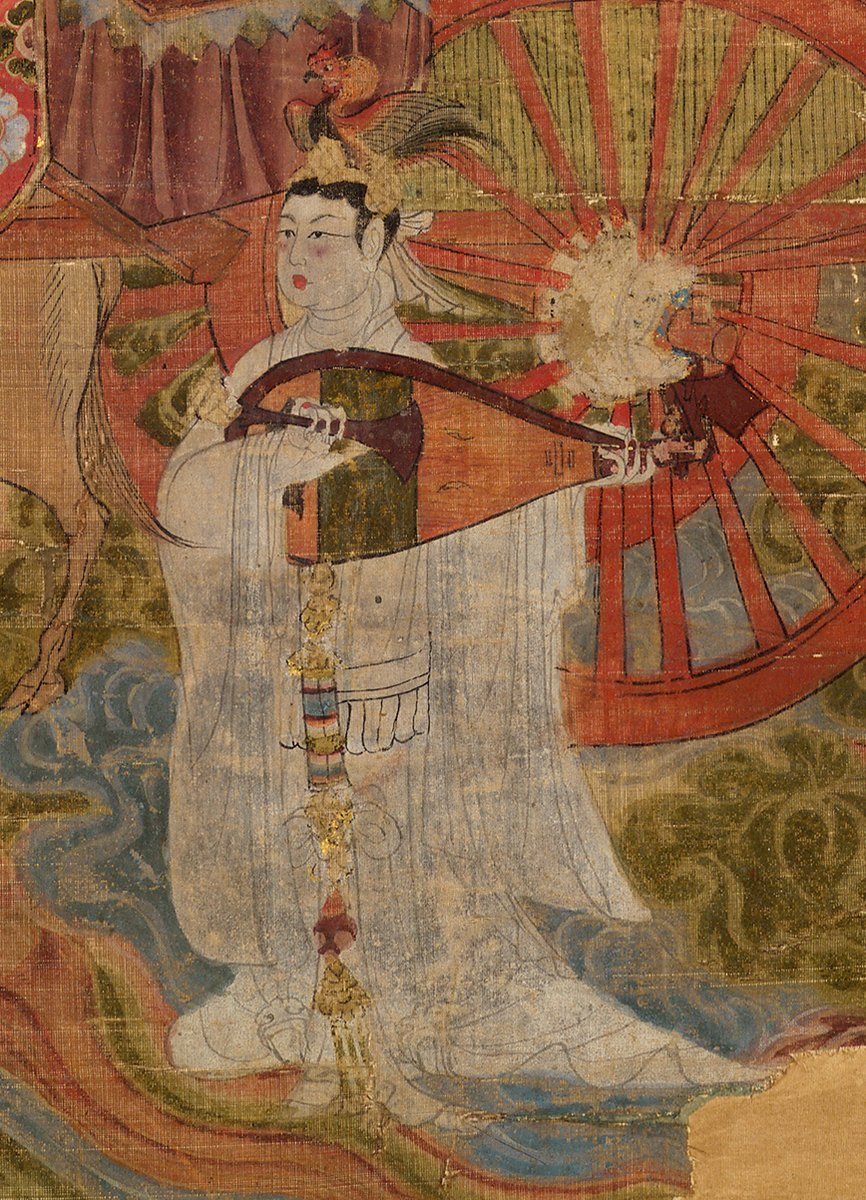
Female figure of Taibai from a Tang dynasty painting on silk, 897 A.D.

Passing mention in several storytellers' tales reveals little about him, though one tale, a variant on the usual seduction story, claims that heaven was scandalized when Taibai Jinxing, charmed by two celestial weaving girls, was led off to a cave where he remained with them, alone, for forty-six days. This escapade was uncovered during a celestial inquiry into the cause of a lengthy drought. Taibai Jinxing, responsible for rain, having been discovered and escorted back to his post, quickly brought rain to the parched region, and the weaving girls saved their skins by retiring to remote celestial palaces.

According to Taoist classical description, Taibai Jinxing is described as a goddess. The goddess is in yellow with a cockscomb-like hat and a lute in her hands. But after the Ming dynasty, as the classical novel Journey to the West was widely spread, in this novel Taibai Jinxing was an old male god and an envoy of the Jade Emperor, the ruler of Heaven. After hearing of the appearance of Sun Wukong, the Jade Emperor tasked Taibai Jinxing to summon him to Heaven. Initially Taibai Jinxing was the first person from Heaven that was to see Sun Wukong. After which Sun Wukong consented to leave with Taibai Jinxing. However, Sun Wukong was angry at the fact that he was appointed as the Protector of the Horses (i.e., made the stableboy as an insult), and rebelled against Heaven. This led to Taibai Jinxing to once again act as a messenger and somewhat a friend toward Sun Wukong. Taibai Jinxing is also associated as the messenger god in Chinese folk religion.

Dongfang Shuo, a Han dynasty scholar-official, was considered to be the reincarnation of Taibai Jinxing.

The Tang dynasty poet Li Bai's mother dreamed Taibai Jinxing when she was pregnant, so she believed that her son was the reincarnation of Taibai Jinxing, and named him 'Li Bai', expressing the words 'Taibai'.

Chinese folk religions consider the appearance of a Taibaixing (Great White Star) particularly during the daytime as a negative omen.
