= White Emperor =

Chinese deity

- Diagram of the Wufang Shangdi
- Major cult centre: Mount Hua
- Predecessor: Huangdi (Wuxing cycle and political)
- Successor: Heidi (Wuxing cycle, also political with Zhuanxu)
- Planet: Venus

Genealogy
- Children: Taibai Jinxing; Huayue Sanniang; Huashan Sanlang

Chinese: 白帝; pinyin: Báidì; trans. "White Emperor" or "White Deity" or Báishén (白神; "White God"), also known as the Xīdì (西帝; "West Deity") or Xīyuèdàdì (西岳大帝; "Great Deity of the Western Peak") is one of the five manifestations of the deity Shangdi. He is associated with metal, the west, and autumn. As a human he was Shǎohào (少昊), and he is the manifestation of the supreme God associated with the essence of metal and autumn. His animal form is the White Dragon (白龙; Báilóng) and his stellar animal is the tiger. His astral body is Venus.

Taibai Jinxing is his son.

== Uprising of the White Serpent ==
According to the legend of the "Uprising of the Slaying of the White Serpent" (斬白蛇起義), Liu's ascension to rulership was prophesied after becoming an outlaw. In the legend, a gigantic white serpent killed some of the outlaws with its poisonous breath; the serpent was killed by a drunk Liu during the night. The next morning, the outlaws encountered an old woman along the road; when asked why she was crying she mysteriously disappeared after replying: "My child, the White Emperor's son, has been slain by the son of the Red Emperor." Liu's reputation grew among his followers, who became convinced of his destiny.

== Xiyue Dadi ==
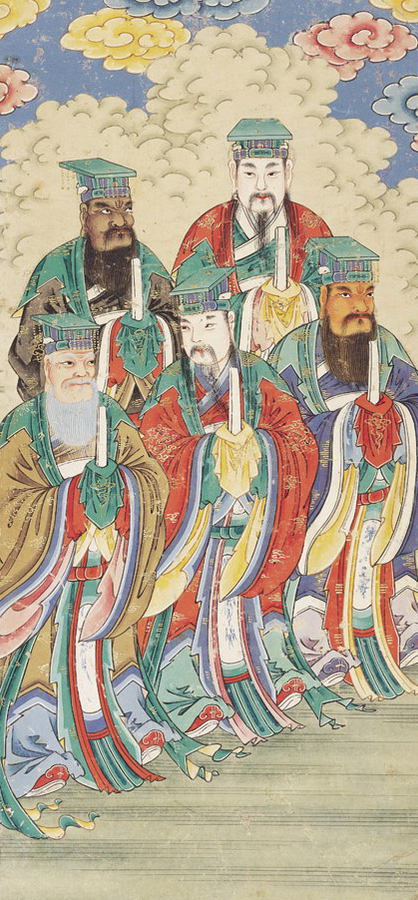
The Great Emperor of Five Mountains

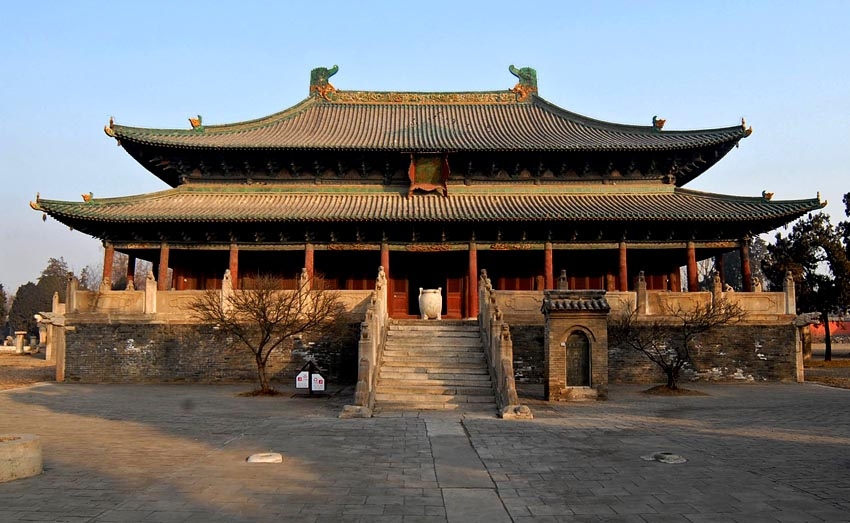
Temple of the Western Peak in Quyang, Baoding, Hebei

Xiyue Dadi (西岳大帝; "Great Deity of the Western Peak") is the god of Mount Hua and one of the Great Emperor of Five Mountains, identified with Baidi. The belief of Emperor Xiyue originated from the worship of mountains and rivers in ancient China. Among the five great mountains, Mount Hua has long been respected for its proximity to Chang'an, the capital of Han and Tang Dynasties. Emperor Wudi built the first worship temple of him at foot of the Mount Hua, he named the temple Jilinggong Palace later changed to Xiyue Temple. Xiyue Dadi is the father of Huayue Sanniang and Huashan Sanlang.

== See also ==
- Shaohao
- Wufang Shangdi
- Three Sovereigns and Five Emperors
- Baidicheng
- Gongsun Shu
- Zhao Gongming
