= Chidi (god) =

Chinese deity, member of the Wufang Shangdi

- Science and technology
- Member of Wufang Shangdi
- Diagram of the Wufang Shangdi
- Major cult centre: Mount Heng
- Predecessor: Cangdi (Wuxing cycle)
- Successor: Huangdi (Wuxing cycle and in office as the Yellow Emperor)
- Planet: Mars

Chìdì (赤帝 "Red Deity" or "Red Emperor") or Chìshén (赤神; "Red God"), also known as the Nándì (南帝; "South Deity") or Nányuèdàdì (南岳大帝; "Great Deity of the Southern Peak"), as a human was Shénnóng (神农; "Farmer God" or "Plowing God"), who is also the same as Yándì (炎帝; "Flame Deity" or "Fiery Deity"), a function occupied by different gods and god-kings in mytho-history. Shennong is also one of the Three Patrons, specifically the patron of humanity (人皇; Rénhuáng), and the point of intersection of the Three Patrons and Huangdi.

In response to Wuxing thought and Tu Shi, the founder of the Han dynasty, Liu Bang, is said to be the son of the Red Emperor; in the Han dynasty God of the Five Directions, the Red Emperor represents the Southern God. Among the Taoist deities, there are also deities that use the title of Red Emperor, such as Hung Shing.

The title has been used to refer to Yan Emperor, Shennong, Emperor Yao and Zhurong.

He is also associated with Chīyóu (蚩尤), the god of some southern peoples, in both iconography and myth, as both Shennong Yandi and Chiyou fought against the Yellow Emperor, although Chiyou is traditionally considered more violent and has the horns of a fighting bull, while Shennong Yandi is more peaceful and has the horns of a plowing buffalo.

He is the manifestation of the supreme God associated with the essence of fire; his animal form is the Red Dragon (朱龙; Zhūlóng) and his stellar animal is the phoenix. He is the god of agriculture, animal husbandry, medicinal plants and market. In broader conceptualisation, he is the god of science and craft, and the patron of doctors and apothecaries. His astral body is Mars.

== Yandi ==
The Yi Zhou Shu states that Chiyou was once a vassal of the Red Emperor and was appointed to rule the land of Shaohao. As Chiyou became more powerful, he fought with the Red Emperor in Zhuolu. The Red Emperor was defeated and turned to the Huang Di for help. The Yellow Emperor defeated Chi You and restored peace to the world.。

According to Wang Fu's "The Theory of Subtlety", the Flame Emperor's Shennong clan, son of the divine dragon, called himself Yan Di, inherited the title of Shennong and replaced Fuxi as the common lord of the world.。

== Shennong ==
Shennong often identified with the Red Emperor

== Yao and Liu Bang ==
The saying that Yao was the Red Emperor originated in the Han dynasty. The Shiji (Records of the Grand Historian), citing the Shippen and the Da Dai Li (Records of the Grand Ritual), states that Yao was one of the Five Emperors. In line with the Five Virtues of the Beginning, Yao is considered to be the Red Emperor. Legend has it that Liu Bang was the son of the Red Emperor after Yao.。

== Zhurong ==
Zhurong is often identified with the Red Emperor

== Bibliography ==
- Sun, Xiaochun; Kistemaker, Jacob (1997). The Chinese Sky During the Han: Constellating Stars and Society. Brill. ISBN 9004107371.
- Fowler, Jeanine D. (2005). An Introduction to the Philosophy and Religion of Taoism: Pathways to Immortality. Sussex Academic Press. ISBN 1845190866.
- Bonnefoy, Yves (1993). Asian Mythologies. University of Chicago Press. ISBN 0226064565.
