= Dongyue Temple =

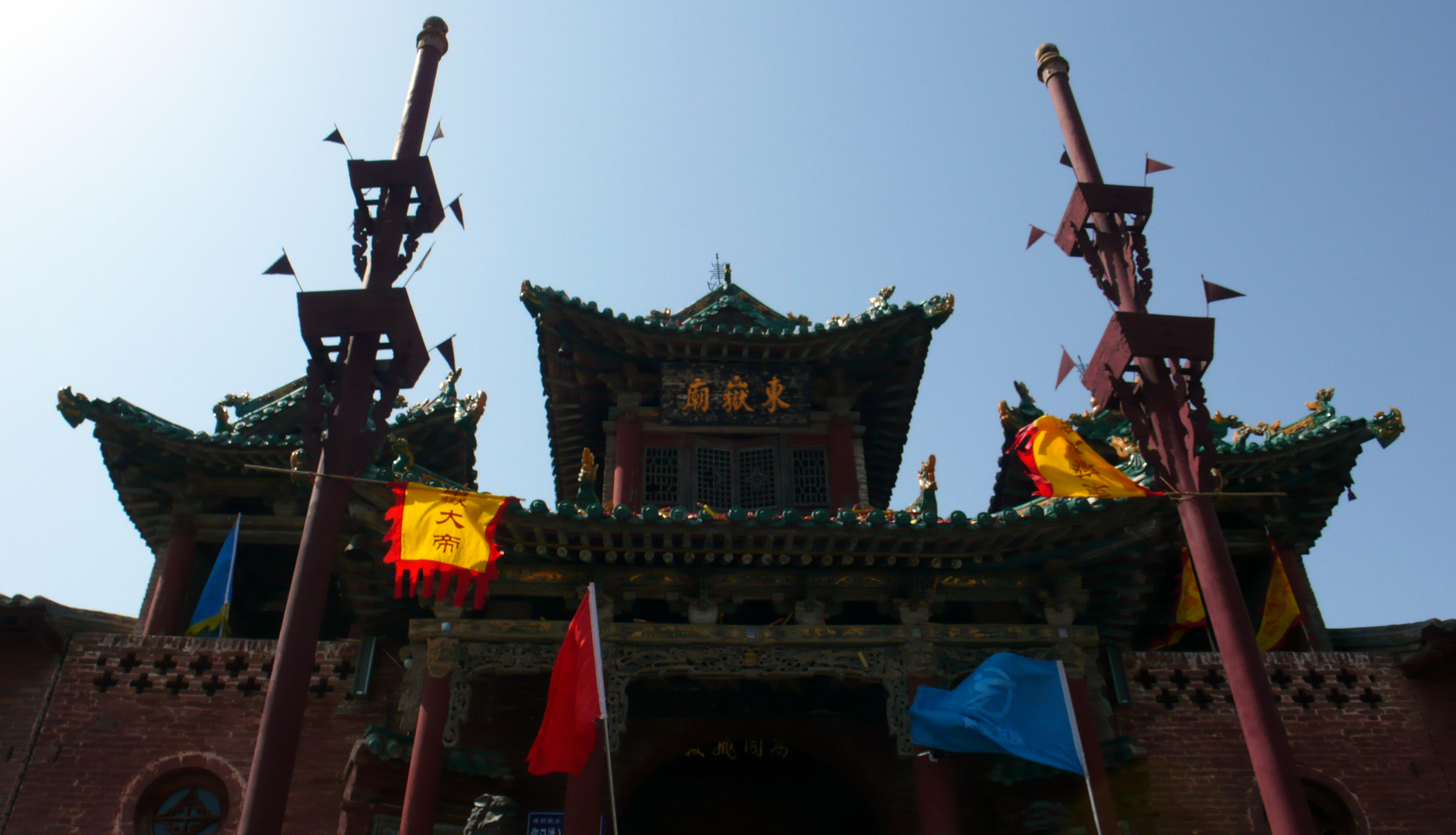
Baishan Dongyue Temple in Pu, Linfen, Shanxi.

Dongyue Temple may refer to several Taoist/folk religious temples dedicated to the Great Deity of the Eastern Peak (Chinese: 东岳大帝; pinyin: Dōngyuèdàdì), that is Mount Tai:

- Dongyue miao 东岳庙 (Beijing), Beijing Dongyue Temple
- Dongyue guan 东岳观 (Zhejiang, Pingyang)
- Dongyue guan 东岳观 (Zhejiang, Rui'an County)
- Dongyue miao 东岳庙 (Jiangsu, Huai'an)
- Dongyue miao 东岳庙 (Shandong)
- Jiexiu Dongyue miao 介休东岳庙, Jiexiu
- Wanrong Dongyue miao 万荣东岳庙, Wanrong, Shanxi
