= Wufang Shangdi =

Traditional Chinese fivefold deity

Five Forms of the Highest Deity
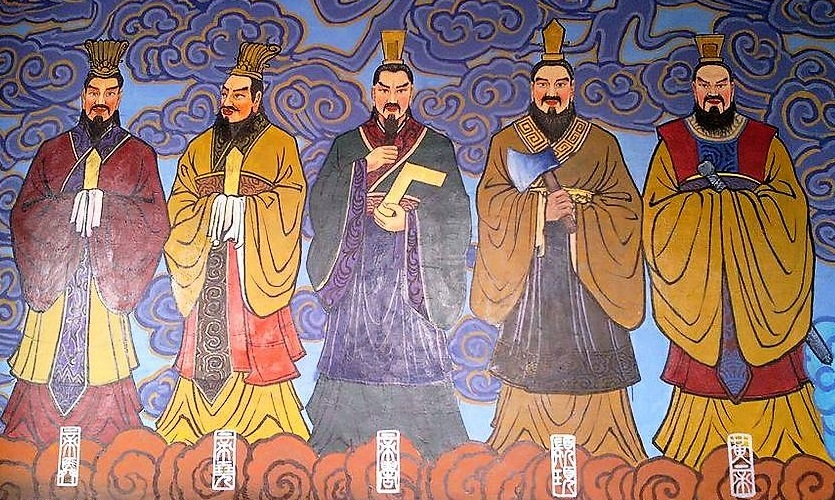
- Modern fresco representing the Five Deities

- Diagram of the associations from the Huainanzi
- Simplified Chinese: 五方上帝
Transcriptions
Standard Mandarin
- Hanyu Pinyin: Wǔfāng Shàngdì
- Wade–Giles: Wu Fang Shang Ti

Five Deities
- Chinese: 五帝
Transcriptions
Standard Mandarin
- Hanyu Pinyin: Wǔdì
- Wade–Giles: Wu Ti

The Wǔfāng Shàngdì (Chinese: 五方上帝 "Five Regions' Highest Deities" or "Highest Deities of the Five Regions" (Note: The grapheme 方, in its Shang versions, was alternately represented as a cross potent ☩, in homography with 巫; wū ("shaman").)), or simply Wǔdì (五帝; "Five Deities") or Wǔshén (五神; "Five Gods") are, in Chinese canonical texts and common Chinese religion, the fivefold manifestation of the supreme God of Heaven (天; Tiān, or equivalently 上帝; Shàngdì). This theology dates back at least to the Shang dynasty. Described as the "five changeable faces of Heaven", they represent Heaven's cosmic activity which shapes worlds as 壇; tán, "altars", imitating its order which is visible in the starry vault, the north celestial pole and its spinning constellations. (Note: The Chinese concept equivalent of the Indian mandala.) The Five Deities themselves represent these constellations. In accordance with the Three Powers (三才; Sāncái) they have a celestial, a terrestrial and a chthonic form. The Han Chinese identify themselves as the descendants of the Red and Yellow Deities.

They are associated with the five colors, the five phases of the continuous creation (五行; Wuxing), the five classical planets of the Solar System and the five constellations rotating around the celestial pole, the five sacred mountains and five directions of space (their terrestrial form), and the five Dragon Gods (龙神; Lóngshén) who represent their mounts, that is to say the material forces they preside over (their chthonic form). They have also been defined simply as five special forms of the worship of the God of Heaven, different "accesses" or perspectives, suitable for different situations, to serve Heaven.

According to Zheng Xuan, the influence of their activity begets different categories of beings on earth. Explaining the ancient theology about the origins of kings from Heaven's impregnation of earthly women, he commented:

王者之先祖, 皆感大微五帝之精以生 — Every ancestor of him who is the king was given birth to as the result of an influential movement [感; gǎn] made by the spirits of the Five Deities.

== Names and meanings ==
Other names by which the Five Deities are collectively known are:

- Wǔfāng Tiānshén (五方天神; "Five Regions' Heavenly Deities");
- Wǔfāngdì (五方帝; "Five Regions' Deities");
- Wǔtiāndì (五天帝; "Five Heavenly Deities");
- Wǔlǎojūn (五老君; "Five Olden Lords");
- Wǔdàoshén (五道神; "Five Ways God(s)");
- Xiāntiān Wǔdì (先天五帝; "Five Deities of the Former Heaven");
- Wǔsèdì (五色帝; "Five Colors' Deities").

In some works they are conceptualized as a single deity, the "Great Deity the Heavenly King" (天皇大帝; Tiānhuáng Dàdì) or "Highest Deity of the Vast Heaven" (昊天上帝; Hàotiān Shàngdì), which are therefore other epithets for the supreme God of Heaven. This concept relates in the microcosm to the Heart, and the four souls being a reflection of qualities of the Shen in Chinese medical theory.

=== Huangdi—Yellow Deity ===
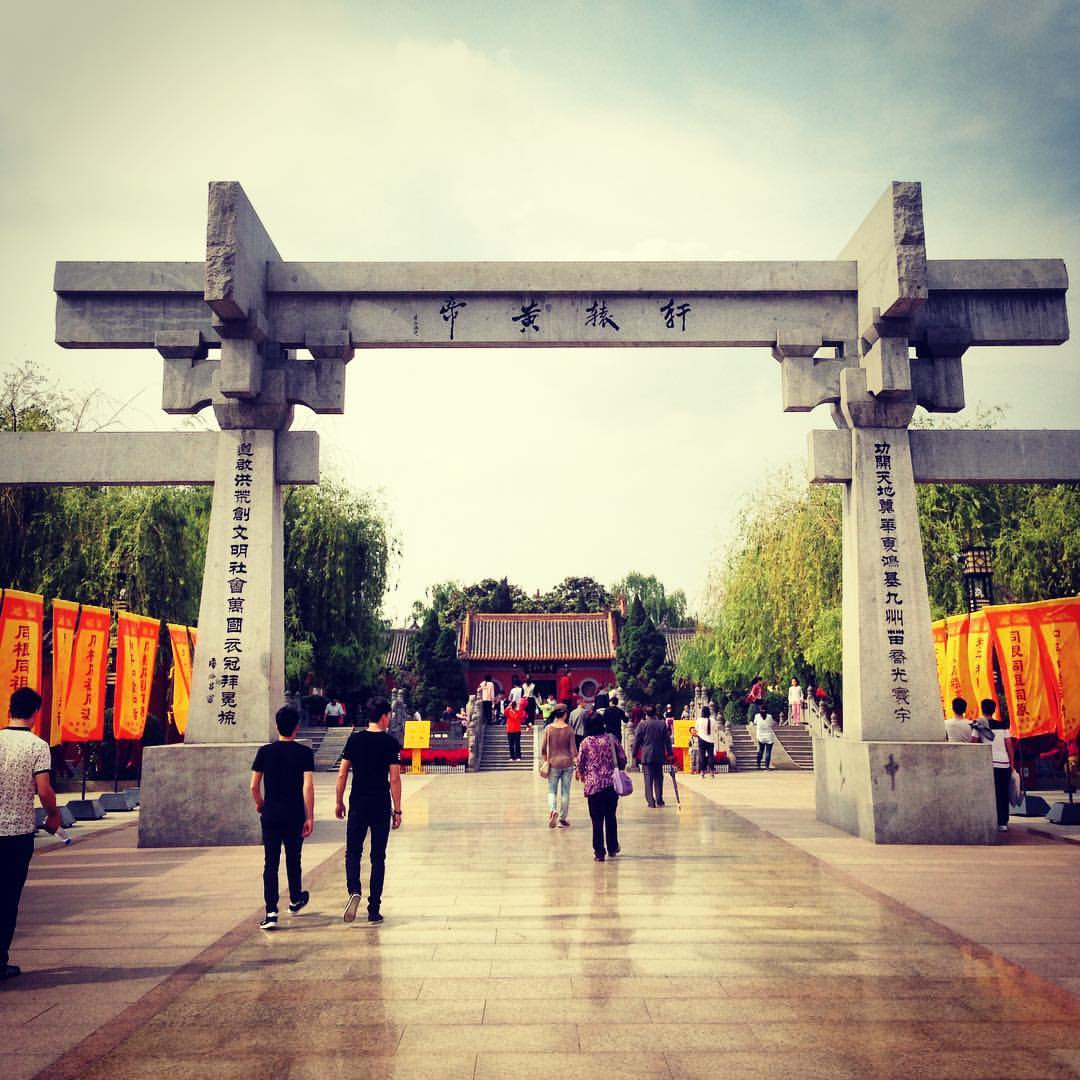
Temple of Huangdi in Xinzheng, the reputed birthplace of Xuanyuan, in Zhengzhou, Henan.

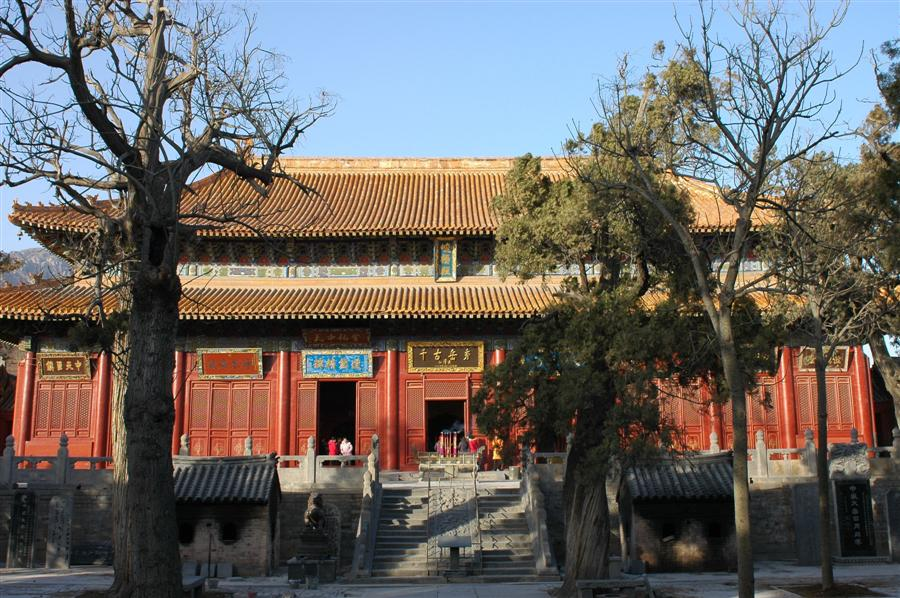
Temple of the Central Peak, Mount Song, in Henan.

Huángdì (黄帝) "Yellow Emperor" or "Yellow Deity"), also called Huángshén (黄神; "Yellow God"), is another name of the supreme God in Chinese traditions, associated to the northern culmen of the sky and the Big Dipper (or Great Chariot, or Ursa Major) in particular, and with the power of the wu (巫) shamans. He is also known, as a human culture hero and progenitor, as Xuānyuán (轩辕) "Chariot Shaft"), Xuānyuánshì (轩辕氏; "Master of the Chariot Shaft"), or Xuānyuán Huángdì (轩辕黄帝; "Yellow Deity of the Chariot Shaft"), and as a cosmological symbol as Zhōngyuèdàdì (中岳大帝; "Great Deity of the Central Peak"). He represents the essence of earth and the Yellow Dragon (黄龙; Huánglóng). The character 黄; huáng, for "yellow," was often used in ancient literature as an equivalent to 皇; huáng, for "august", "creator" and "radiant", attributes of the supreme God.

He is the deity who shapes the material world (地; Dì), the creator of the Huaxia civility, of marriage and morality, language and lineage, and primal ancestor of all the Chinese. In the cosmology of the Wufang Shangdi his astral body is Saturn, but he is also identified as the Sun God, and with the star Regulus (α Leonis) and constellations Leo and Lynx, of which the latter is said to represent the body of the Yellow Dragon.

He corresponds to the Huángshén Běidǒu (黄神北斗; "Yellow God of the Northern Dipper"), (Note: A 斗; dǒu in Chinese is an entire semantic field meaning the shape of a "dipper", as the Big Dipper (北斗; Běidǒu), or a "cup", signifying a "whirl", and also has martial connotations meaning "fight", "struggle", "battle".) of whom in certain historical sources he is described as the human form making an ontological distinction between the two. For instance, according to a definition given by apocryphal texts related to the Hétú, the Yellow Emperor "proceeds from the essence of the Yellow God of the Northern Dipper", is born to "a daughter of a chthonic deity", and as such he is "a cosmic product of the conflation of Heaven and Earth". The Yellow God is in turn described as the "spirit father and astral double" of the Yellow Emperor.

As a human being, the Yellow Emperor is said to have been the fruit of a virginal birth, as his mother Fubao was impregnated by a radiance (yuanqi, "primordial pneuma"), a lightning, which she saw encircling the Northern Dipper (Great Chariot, or Ursa Major), or the celestial pole, while she was walking in the countryside. She delivered her son after twenty-four months on the mount of Shou (Longevity) or mount Xuanyuan, after which he was named. Through his human side, he was a descendant of the Youxiong clan, a lineage of the Bear—another reference to the Ursa Major. Scholar John C. Didier has studied the parallels that the Yellow Emperor's mythology has in other cultures, deducing a plausible ancient origin of the myth in Siberia or in north Asia.

In older accounts, the Yellow Emperor is identified as a deity of light (and his name is explained in the Shuowen Jiezi to derive from 光; guāng; "light") and thunder, and as one and the same with the "Thunder God" (雷神; Léishén), who in turn, as a later mythological character, is distinguished as the Yellow Emperor's foremost pupil, such as in the Huangdi Neijing.

Huangdi represents the hub of creation, the axis mundi (Kunlun) that is the manifestation of the divine order in physical reality, opening the way to immortality. As the deity of the centre of the four directions, in the Shizi he is described as "Yellow Emperor with Four Faces" (黄帝四面; Huángdì Sìmiàn). The "Four-Faced God" or "Ubiquitous God" (四面神; Sìmiànshén) is also the Chinese name of Brahma. Huangdi is the model of those who merge their self with the self of the universal God, of the ascetics who reach enlightenment or immortality.

In Sima Qian's description of the Five Deities, the Yellow Emperor was portrayed as the grandfather of the Black Emperor of the north who personifies as well the pole stars, and as the tamer of the Red Emperor, his half-brother, who is the spirit of the southern populations known collectively as Chu in the Zhou dynasty.

The Wufang Shangdi were also thought to rule over points in the five cardinal directions, or "cardinal points". Huang Di rules over the center point.

=== Cangdi—Blue Deity ===
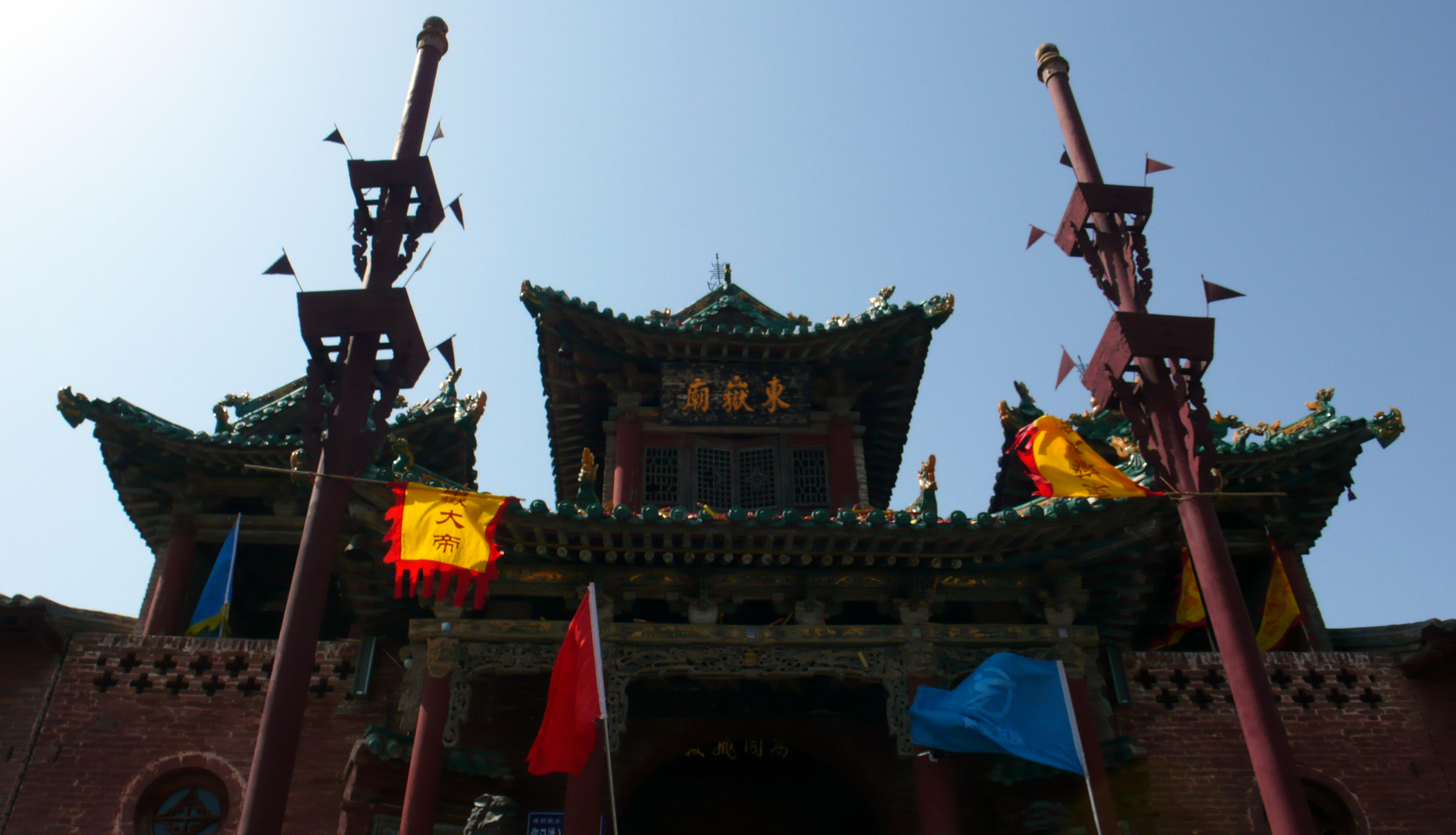
Temple of the Eastern Peak of Baishan, in Pu, Linfen, Shanxi.

Cāngdì (蒼帝; "Green Deity" or "Green Emperor") or Cāngshén (蒼神; "Green God"), also known as Qīngdì (青帝; "Blue Deity" or "Blue Emperor") or Qīngshén (青神; "Blue God"), and cosmologically as the Dōngdì (东帝; "East Deity") or Dōngyuèdàdì (东岳大帝; "Great Deity of the Eastern Peak"), is the manifestation of the supreme God associated with the essence of wood and spring, for which he is worshipped as the god of fertility. The Blue Dragon (青龙; Qīnglóng) is both his animal form and constellation, and as a human he was Tàihào (太昊) (Fu Xi). His female consort is the goddess of fertility Bixia. His astral body is Jupiter.

=== Heidi—Black Deity ===
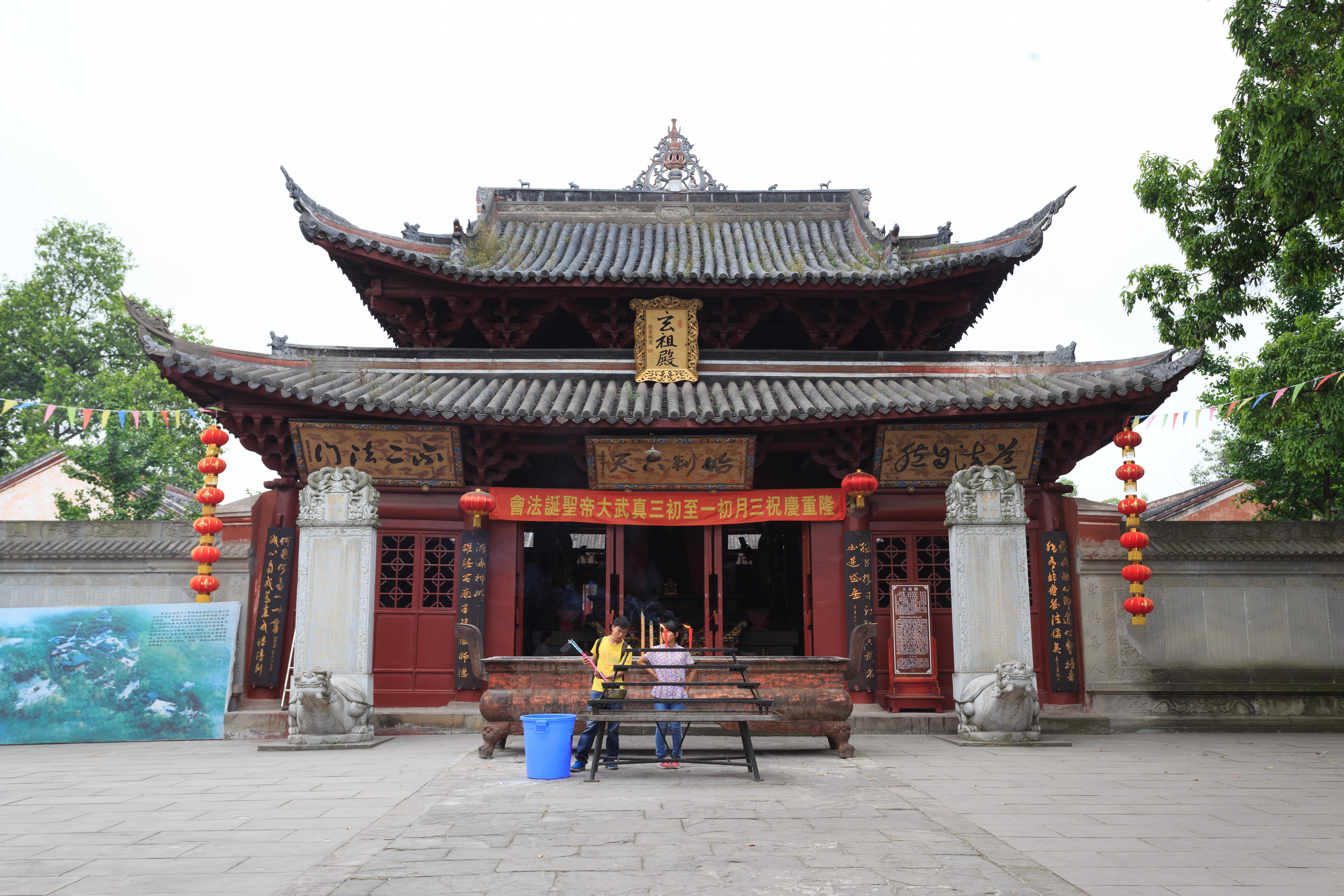
Temple of the Dark Ancestor in Yibin, Sichuan.

Hēidì (黑帝; "Black Deity" or "Black Emperor") or Hēishén (黑神; "Black God"), also known as the cosmological Běidì (北帝; "North Deity") or Běiyuèdàdì (北岳大帝; "Great Deity of the Northern Peak"), and identified as Zhuānxū (颛顼), today frequently worshipped as Xuánwǔ (玄武; "Dark Warrior") or Zhēnwǔ, is the manifestation of the supreme God associated with the essence of water and winter. His animal form is the Black Dragon (玄龙; Xuánlóng; 'Dark Dragon', 'Mysterious Dragon') and his stellar animal is the turtle-snake. His astral body is Mercury.

=== Chidi—Red Deity ===
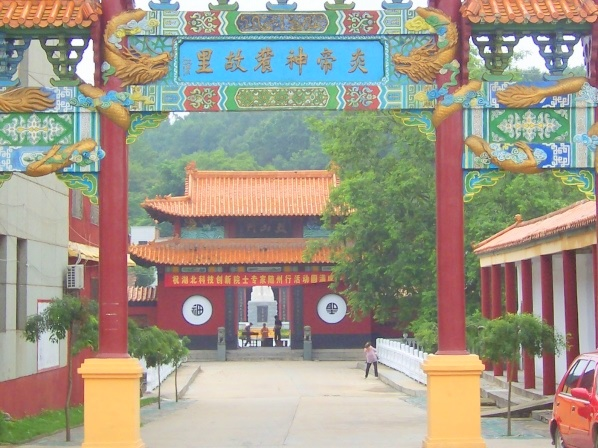
Temple of Yandi in his reputed birthplace in Suizhou, Hubei.

Chìdì (赤帝; "Red Deity" or "Red Emperor") or Chìshén (赤神; "Red God"), also known as the Nándì (南帝; "South Deity") or Nányuèdàdì (南岳大帝; "Great Deity of the Southern Peak"), as a human was Shénnóng (神农; "Farmer God" or "Plowing God"), who is also the same as Yándì (炎帝; "Flame Deity" or "Fiery Deity"), a function occupied by different gods and god-kings in mytho-history. Shennong is also one of the Three Patrons, specifically the patron of humanity (人皇; Rénhuáng, and the point of intersection of the Three Patrons and Huangdi.

He is also associated with Chīyóu (蚩尤), the god of some southern peoples, in both iconography and myth, as both Shennong Yandi and Chiyou fought against the Yellow Emperor, although Chiyou is traditionally considered more violent and has the horns of a fighting bull, while Shennong Yandi is more peaceful and has the horns of a plowing buffalo.

He is the manifestation of the supreme God associated with the essence of fire; his animal form is the Red Dragon (朱龙; Zhūlóng) and his stellar animal is the phoenix. He is the god of agriculture, animal husbandry, medicinal plants and market. In broader conceptualisation, he is the god of science and craft, and the patron of doctors and apothecaries. His astral body is Mars.

=== Baidi—White Deity ===
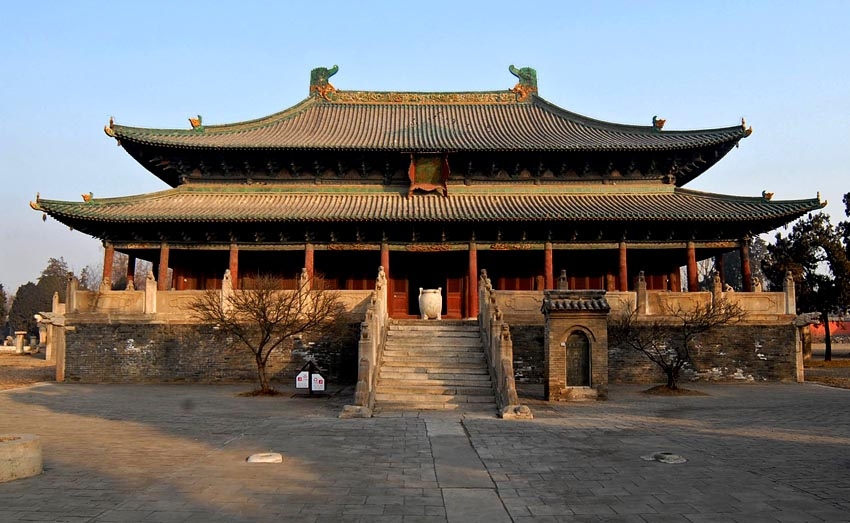
Temple of the Western Peak in Quyang, Baoding, Hebei.

Báidì (白帝; "White Emperor" or "White Deity") or Báishén (白神; "White God"), also known as the Xīdì (西帝; "West Deity") or Xīyuèdàdì (西岳大帝; "Great Deity of the Western Peak"), as a human was Shǎohào (少昊), and he is the manifestation of the supreme God associated with the essence of metal and autumn. His animal form is the White Dragon (白龙; Báilóng) and his stellar animal is the tiger. His astral body is Venus.

== Contrast between the Red and the Yellow Deities ==
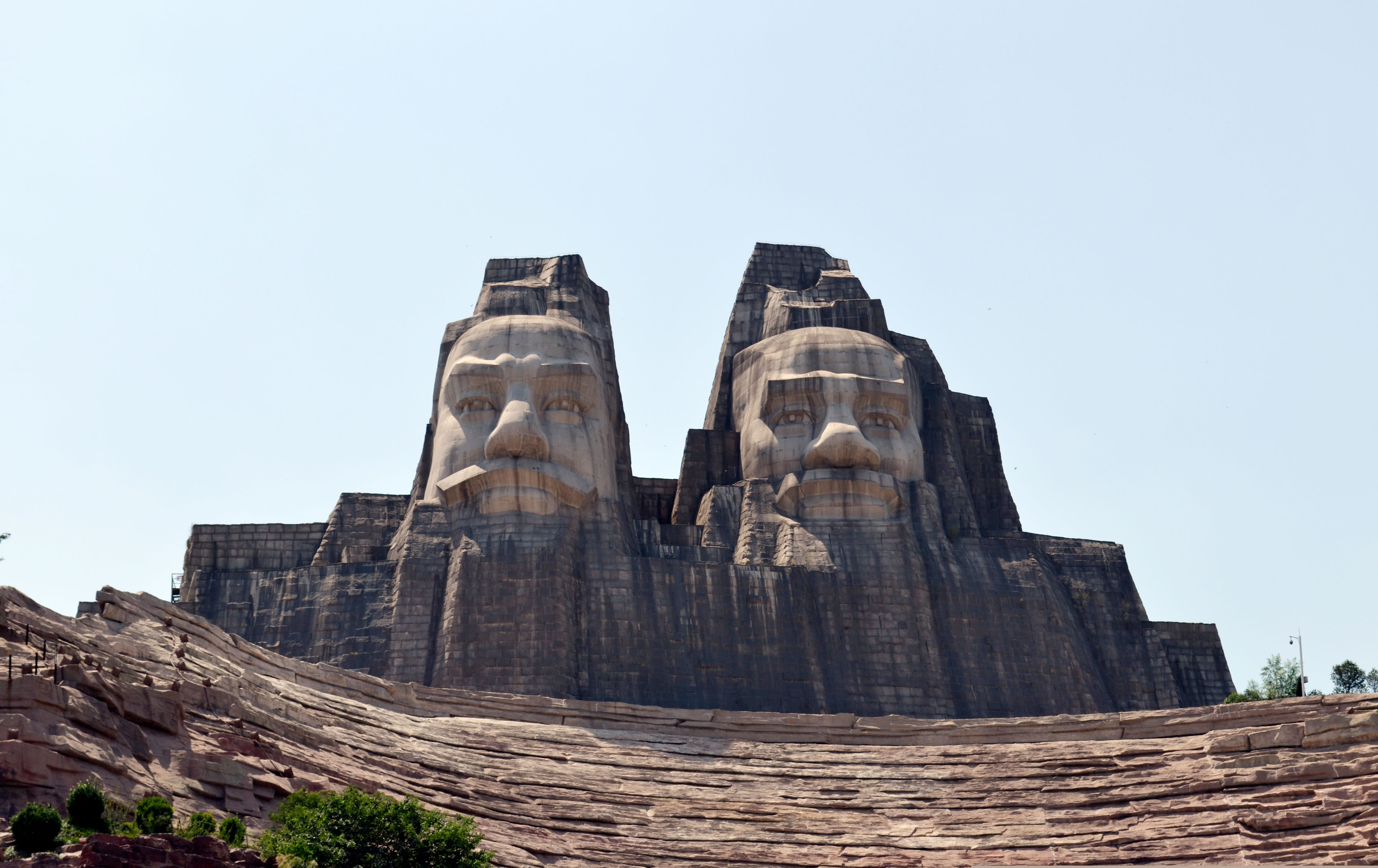
Statue and ceremonial complex of the Yellow and Red Deities in Zhengzhou, Henan.

In mythology, Huangdi and Yandi fought a battle against each other; and Huang finally defeated Yan with the help of the Dragon (the controller of water, who is Huangdi himself).

This myth symbolises the equipoise of yin and yang, here the fire of knowledge (reason and craft) and earthly stability. 炎; Yan is flame, scorching fire, or an excess of it (it is important to notice that graphically it is a double 火; huo; "fire").

As an excess of fire brings destruction to the earth, it has to be controlled by a ruling principle. Nothing is good in itself, without limits; good outcomes depend on the proportion in the composition of things and their interactions, never on extremes in absolute terms. Huangdi and Yandi are complementary opposites, necessary for the existence of one another, and they are powers that exist together within the human being.

== History of the cult of the Five Deities ==
The worship of the Five Deities by both commoners and rulers of China is a very ancient practice, dating back at least to the Neolithic. Already in the theology of the Shang dynasty, the supreme God of Heaven (Shangdi or Di) was conceived as manifesting in a fourfold form and will, the four 方; fāng ("directions" or "sides") and their 風; fēng ("winds").

=== Qin dynasty ===
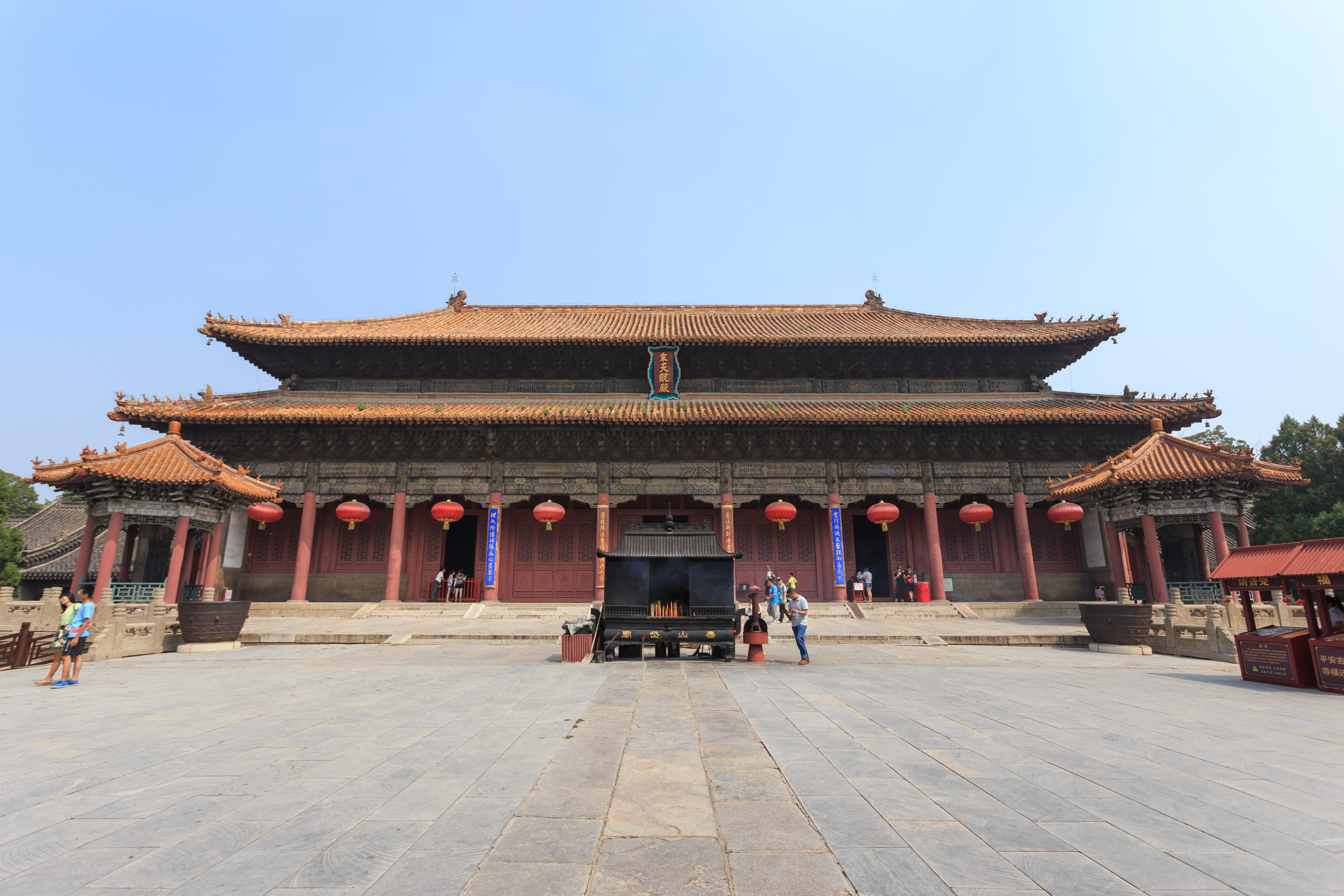
Main hall of the Dai Temple (岱庙; Dàimiào) at Mount Tai. As the major one of the Eastern Peak Temples, dedicated to the Blue Deity, the spring aspect of the Highest Deity identified with Jupiter, it is a site of fire sacrifice to Di since prehistoric times. Mount Tai is the holiest of China's sacred mountains; according to mythology it formed from Pangu's head after his body's dissection.

The official religion and ritual of the state of Qin (9th century BCE–221 BCE) was largely based on that of the Zhou dynasty (c. 1046 BCE–256 BCE). The emperors worshipped the supreme God at a location in the suburbs of their capital Xianyang. The cults of the White, Blue, Yellow and Red Deities had been celebrated separately in different parts of the state. In 677 BCE, Yong, an ancient sacred site where the Yellow Emperor himself was said to have sacrificed and the Zhou dynasty carried out 醮; jiào rituals, or "suburban sacrifices", became the capital of Qin.

It is attested that in 671 BCE, Duke Xuan (675–664) carried out the sacrifices for the Blue Deity in Mi, south of the Wei River. Then, Duke Ling (?–384) instituted the sacred sites of Shàng (上; "Above") and Xià (下; "Below"), for the Yellow and Red Deities, in Wuyang, near Yong. Originally, the sacrifice for the White Deity had been carried out in 769 BCE by Duke Xiang (778–766) in Xi, near Lanzhou in Gansu. In 753 they were carried out by Duke Wen (765–716) in Fu, northeast Shaanxi.

In 253 BCE the great-grandfather of Qin Shihuang unified the imperial cult of the four forms of God in Yong, constructing there altars for the White, Blue, Yellow and Red Deities. In 219, Qin Shihuang, founder of the Qin empire (221 BCE–206 BCE), personally sacrificed at Mount Tai, the sacred mountain at the centre of Shandong, a site for the worship of the supreme godhead in the erstwhile states of Qi and Lu. He modelled the sacrifice on that performed at Yong, in alignment with the Qin tradition, consisting of three types of victims—horses, rams and oxen.

=== Han dynasty ===
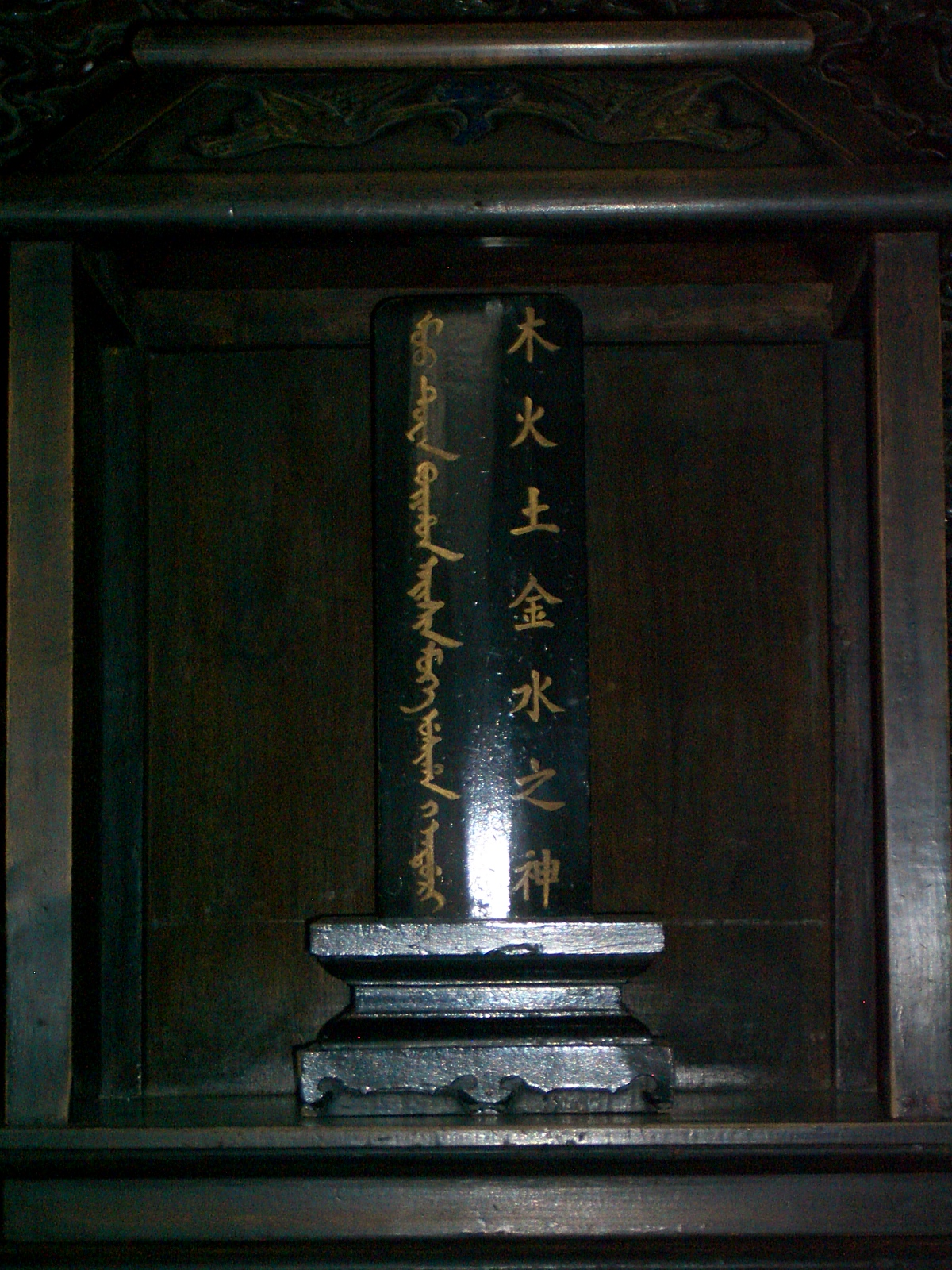
Tablet in the Temple of Heaven of Beijing, written in Chinese and Manchu, dedicated to the Five Deities. The Manchu word usiha, meaning "star", explains that this tablet is dedicated to the five planets: Jupiter, Mars, Saturn, Venus and Mercury and the movements which they govern.

The ritual system of the early emperors of the Han dynasty (206 BCE–220 AD) was not different from that of the Qin, with the only change consisting in the integration of the Black Deity by Gaozu or Liu Bang (206–195), the first emperor of the dynasty. However, Han state religion soon found itself divided between two factions. On one hand there were the Confucians who pushed for a new ritual system and a religio-political centralisation around the worship of the God of Heaven by the emperor, the God of Heaven's son, and the worship of lesser deities who had to be approved by the Confucians themselves, who considered themselves the only ones capable of interpreting the signs of Heaven in accordance with the classics. On the other hand, there were the fangshi (方士; "masters of directions"), ritual masters who formulated what would have been called the "Huang–Lao" proto-Taoist religious movement, who presented themselves as the continuators of the traditions of the erstwhile kingdoms, and who emphasised the worship of local deities integrated into a theology in which the supreme God of Heaven was named Taiyi ("Great One"), and its human manifestation was the ancestral Yellow Emperor whom the emperors had to imitate.

The imperial temple at Yong which was established by the great-grandfather of Qin Shihuang was rearranged placing the altars of the gods each in its respective direction, and that of the Yellow Deity at the centre. Outside Yong, two other temples dedicated to the Five Deities were built during the reign of Emperor Wen (180–157), one in Weiyang, northeast of Chang'an, and one in Chengji near the modern county of Tongwei in Gansu. The sacrifices at Yong held a central positions and were carried out every three years by the emperor. If the emperor was absent, the rituals were performed by masters of rites, at various times throughout the year based on the ritual calendar of the Qin.

In 113 BCE, Emperor Wu of Han innovated the Confucian state religion integrating the Huang–Lao conception of Taiyi with the Five Deities and the cult of Houtu ("Queen of the Earth"). In 135 BCE, the fangshi Miu Ji, from Bo in modern Shandong, insisted that Taiyi was the same supreme God, master of the Five Deities, worshipped since remote antiquity by the emperors through the three-victims sacrifice. The rite lasted seven days and took place at a temple with "eight entrances for the numina" in the southeastern suburb of the capital. In conformity with the instructions of Miu Ji, the emperor built a temple in the outskirts of Chang'an and appointed a great invocator (taizhu) to conduct the sacrifices. Twenty years later—under the influence of another prominent court fangshi, Gongsun Qing—the sacrifice was held by the emperor in person. A temple of Taiyi and the Five Deities was built in Ganquan, 70 km (43 mi) northeast of Chang'an. Regarding the liturgy, sacrificial protocol and architectural layout, the sites of Ganquan and Mount Tai followed the model of Yong. Besides the highest gods of the pantheon, the emperor or the central administration celebrated the cults of other gods, including those devoted to mountains and rivers, the sun and moon, stars and constellations, and heroes.

In later times the expansion of the empire to different provinces and peoples was accompanied by a policy of identification or association of native gods and their cults to the imperial Han pantheon, so that the cults officially celebrated by the administration proliferated to the hundreds. In 31 BCE, Confucians at the court, especially Kuang Heng and Zhang Tan, disposed a reform of the state sacrifices, suppressing hundreds of local sacrifices and restricting those performed by the emperor in person only to the worship of Taiyi and Houtu, or Heaven and Earth.

== See also ==
- Three Sovereigns and Five Emperors
- Chinese astrology

Associations

- Jade Emperor
- Three Sovereigns and Five Emperors, mytho-historical personalities
- 五福大帝 Wǔfúdàdì—Five Blessing Great Deities, Fuzhou localised version, known as Emperor Wufu or Wufu Emperor in English
- 五顯大帝 Wǔxiǎndàdì—Five Manifest Great Deities, Taoist adaptation, also known as the "Great Thearch and Divine agent of Five Manifestations", but not related to similarly named deities such as the Wutong Shen
- 五方如來 Wǔfāngrúlái— Five Tathagatas
- 五大仙 Wǔdàxiān—Northeast China's zoomorphic version
- Tenno taitei

General articles

- Chinese folk religion
- Chinese gods and immortals
- Chinese theology
- Sanxing (deities)
- Four Symbols
  - Color in Chinese culture
  - List of Journey to the West characters § Taoist pantheon
- Navagraha (the Classical planets in Hindu mythology).
- Planetae (the Classical planets in Ancient Greek mythology).
