= Youjiao clan =

Chinese clan during the era of Three Sovereigns and Five Emperors

The Youjiao clan (有蟜氏) was a Chinese clan that existed during the Three Sovereigns and Five Emperors period. It is traditionally attributed as the clan of Fubao, who is the mother of the Yellow Emperor. (Note: Book4 of Discourses of the States, named Discourses of Jin, writes, "Earlier, Shaodian married a Youjiao(as in family name youjiao), and gave birth to the Yellow Emperor and Yan Emperor (昔少典娶于有蟜氏,生黄帝、炎帝)") The clan lived in Pingfeng Mountain (平逢山) in Luoyang, and had a bee as their totem for generations in Song County. The earliest record about the clan can be found in the Classic of Mountains and Seas. (Note: 6th section of classics of the mountain:central. "The peak of the gao di mountain is called pingfeng mountain, where Yi River (Henan) and the Luo River (Henan) can be seen when you look at the southern part, Gu cheng mountain can be seen when you look at the eastern part, and have no vegetation, water and a lot of sand and pebbles. The god they worship looks like a two headed human, and is called jiao chong. which is the leader of all the thing that stings, and its actually their home. The ritual to the god uses a rooster, which they do not kill. (中次六经 缟羝山之首，曰平逢之山，南望伊洛，东望穀城之山，无草木，无水，多沙石。有神焉，其状如人而二首，名曰骄虫，是为螫虫，实为蜂蜜之庐。其祠之，用一雄鸡，禳而勿杀。)) Pingfeng is an old name of "Mang mountain (邙山)" in the region of Luoyang,
