= Duis =

Duis is a surname. Notable people with this surname include:

- Robert Duis (1913–1991), German basketball player
- Thomas Duis (born 1958), German pianist

== See also ==
- Dui (vessel), a type of ritual bronze vessel
- Luis
