= Tongyushi =

Legendary Chinese empress

Tongyushi (Chinese: 彤魚氏) was a legendary Chinese empress, the third wife of the Yellow Emperor. According to tradition, she invented the cooking and chopsticks in the 27th century BC.
