= Fubao =

Mother of Huangdi

Fubao (traditional Chinese: 附寶; simplified Chinese: 附宝; pinyin: fùbǎo), a woman from the Youjiao clan, was, according to Chinese mythology sources, the mother-in-law of the inventor of silk, Leizu; mother of Huang Di the Yellow Emperor; and wife of Shaodian. However, the mythological genealogy varies. Fubao is viewed as an ancestress by the Han people, who form the majority of the population of China.

== Daughter-in-law, Leizu ==
Fubao was mother-in-law to Leizu, who was the inventor of sericulture, the art of silk production, according to Chinese mythology. Silk and fabrics made from silk are some of the world's important textiles. Silk is believed to have been produced since Neolithic times in China. The "Silk Road" was named after the trade in silk across Eurasia.

== Husband, Shaodian ==
Fubao married Shaodian, who according to the Records of the Grand Historian, was the father of Huang Di.

== Son, Huang Di ==
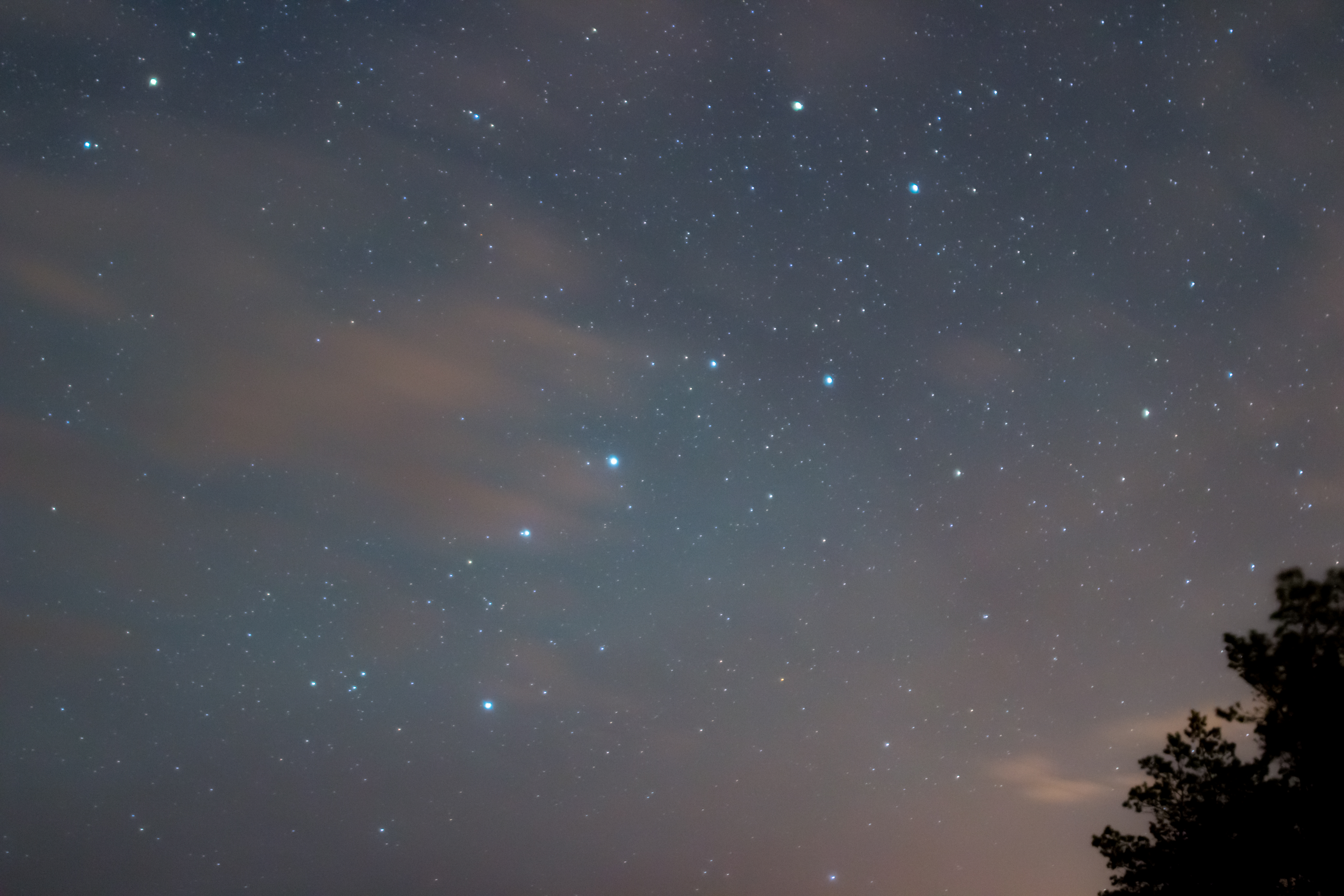
Ursa Major, the Great Bear or Big Dipper

Fubao was the mother of Huang Di, also called the Yellow Emperor. According to Chinese mythology, the birth was miraculous. Fubao is said to have seen a bolt of lightning (or aurora borealis) circling around one of the stars of the Great Bear (Big Dipper). The light was very bright, and she got pregnant. Twenty-four months later Fubao was said to have given birth to Huang Di.

== See also ==
- Chinese folk religion
- Yellow Dragon
