= Shaodian =

Chinese legend, tribal leader

Shaodian 少典
- Spouse: Fubao; Nüdeng
- Issue: Yellow Emperor; Yan Emperor
- Clan: Youxiong
- Father: Fuxi
- Mother: Nuwa

Shaodian (Chinese: 少典) was the father of the Yellow Emperor (黄帝), according to the Records of the Grand Historian. He started the Youxiong clan, whilst his wives were Fubao and Nüdeng of the Youjiao clan. Fubao later gave birth to Huangdi (the Yellow Emperor) and Nüdeng (女登) gave birth to Yandi.

According to Discourses of the States, Shaodian was a stepfather of the Yellow Emperor:

"It was said that Shaodian's wife Fubao gave birth to the Yellow Emperor near the Ji River and the Yan Emperor next to the Jiang River which accounted to their different temperaments. Some said “Although Shaodian preceded the Yellow and Yan emperors, he was not their father.”

"

Lady Hua, the wife of Ye the Great and mother of Fei the Great (also known as Boyi), was said to be his descendant.
