= Momu (goddess) =

Goddess in Chinese mythology

Momu (Chinese: 嫫母) is a Chinese goddess and was a legendary empress as the fourth wife of the Yellow Emperor. According to tradition, she invented the mirror, in the 27th century BC.

Momu is one of the "Five Ugliest Women of Ancient China" along with Zhongli Chun, Meng Guang, Huang Yudying and Lady Ruan. Metaphorically juxtaposing Xi Shi and Momu as two rare extremes, Huainan Zi states that Xi Shi was pleasant to look at even without cosmetics, while Momu was horrible to look at even with them. The Yellow Emperor granted her the official position of "Fang Xiangshi" (方相氏) and used her appearance to drive away evil spirits.

== Physical appearance ==
The Diao Yuji·Chouren Pian of the Tang dynasty described her appearance as: "her shape colored black, the forehead is like a spindle, the nose is tight and her body is as fat like as a box, and she looks black as lacquer."

== Legends ==
According to legend, Momu was an extremely ugly woman with a hunched back and club-feet, who impressed the Yellow Emperor by healing a girl who had been bitten by a poisonous snake. Momu and her family lived in a place surrounded by rivers on the south bank of the Han River, according to the Classic of Mountains and Seas. She was renowned for her gentle nature, feminine virtue, inventive ingenuity, and wise military strategies. She was invited to oversee the divine palace, and her administration was ever proficient, partly because her ugliness drove away evil spirits. To this day villagers keep pictures of her, to ward off evil.

=== Legend of the first mirror ===
According to legend, Momu created the first mirror used by mankind. People in the palace often dressed by a pool of water to see their reflections. Since Momu felt that she was ugly, she didn't dress by the water, or show her face casually on festivals. She only knew to work for the Yellow Emperor all day.

One day the Tongyu clan asked Momu to go up the mountain with them to dig stone slabs. She had a lot of strength, and dug slabs faster than the other women, more than 20 pieces in less than half a day. At noon, when the sun was shining, she found a shiny piece of stone in the pile of rocks. She gently dug it out of the ground with her hand. She was shocked when she looked at it and wondered what kind of monster she saw, with all her ugly faces illuminated on this piece of stone. She quietly hid the stone in her clothing, and did not tell anyone about it when she returned to the palace. When she was alone she took out the stone slice again and found that its surface was uneven and her face's reflections were distorted. In the workshop where stone knives and stone axes were made, she found a grindstone, and rubbed repeatedly the stone with it repeatedly to smooth its surface, and her reflection became much clearer than before.

When the Yellow Emperor heard about this, he came to Momu and tested the mirror and said "This is your great discovery. Not only for you, but you also made a great contribution!". The use of mirrors by mankind has been in the history of the Chinese nation ever since.
