= Yellow Emperor =

Mythical Chinese sovereign

Yellow Emperor 黃帝
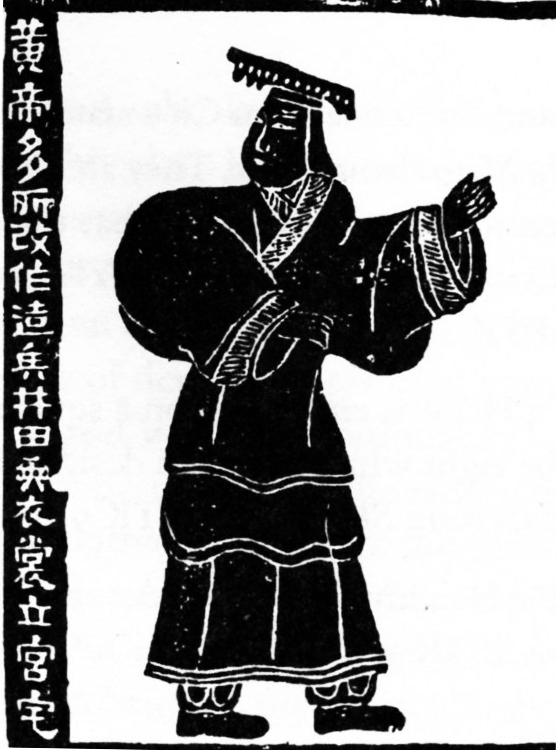
- The Yellow Emperor as depicted in Wu Family Shrines in Jiaxiang, Shandong, from the mid 2nd century AD. The inscription reads: "The Yellow Emperor created and changed a great many things; he invented weapons and the well-field system; he devised upper and lower garments, and established palaces and houses."

Leader of Youxiong
- Predecessor: Shaodian
- Successor: Shaohao
- Born: Gongsun Xuanyuan
- Spouse: Leizu; Fenglei; Tongyushi; Momu
- Issue: Shaohao; Nüba; Changyi
Names
- Ancestral name: Gongsun; Given name: Xuānyuán (軒轅)
- Clan: Youxiong
- Father: Shaodian
- Mother: Fubao

Chinese name
- Traditional Chinese: 黃帝
- Simplified Chinese: 黄帝
- Literal meaning: "Yellow Emperor"; "Yellow Thearch"
Transcriptions
Standard Mandarin
- Hanyu Pinyin: Huángdì
- Bopomofo: ㄏㄨㄤˊ ㄉㄧˋ
- Gwoyeu Romatzyh: Hwangdih
- Wade–Giles: Huang^{2}-ti^{4}
- IPA: [xwǎŋtî]
Yue: Cantonese
- Yale Romanization: Wòhng-dai
- Jyutping: Wong^{4}-dai^{3}
Southern Min
- Tâi-lô: N̂g-tè (col.); Hông-tè (lit.)
Old Chinese
- Baxter–Sagart (2014): *N-kʷˤaŋ tˤek-s

Gongsun Xuanyuan
- Traditional Chinese: 公孫軒轅
- Simplified Chinese: 公孙轩辕
Transcriptions
Standard Mandarin
- Hanyu Pinyin: Gōngsūn Xuānyuán
- Bopomofo: ㄍㄨㄥ ㄙㄨㄣ ㄒㄩㄢ ㄩㄢˊ

Ji Xuanyuan
- Traditional Chinese: 姬軒轅
- Simplified Chinese: 姬轩辕
Transcriptions
Standard Mandarin
- Hanyu Pinyin: Jī Xuānyuán
- Bopomofo: ㄐㄧ ㄒㄩㄢ ㄩㄢˊ
- Member of Wufang Shangdi
- Major cult centre: Mount Song
- Predecessor: Chidi (Wuxing cycle, also political with the Flame Emperor)
- Successor: Baidi (Wuxing cycle, also political with Shaohao)
- Planet: Saturn

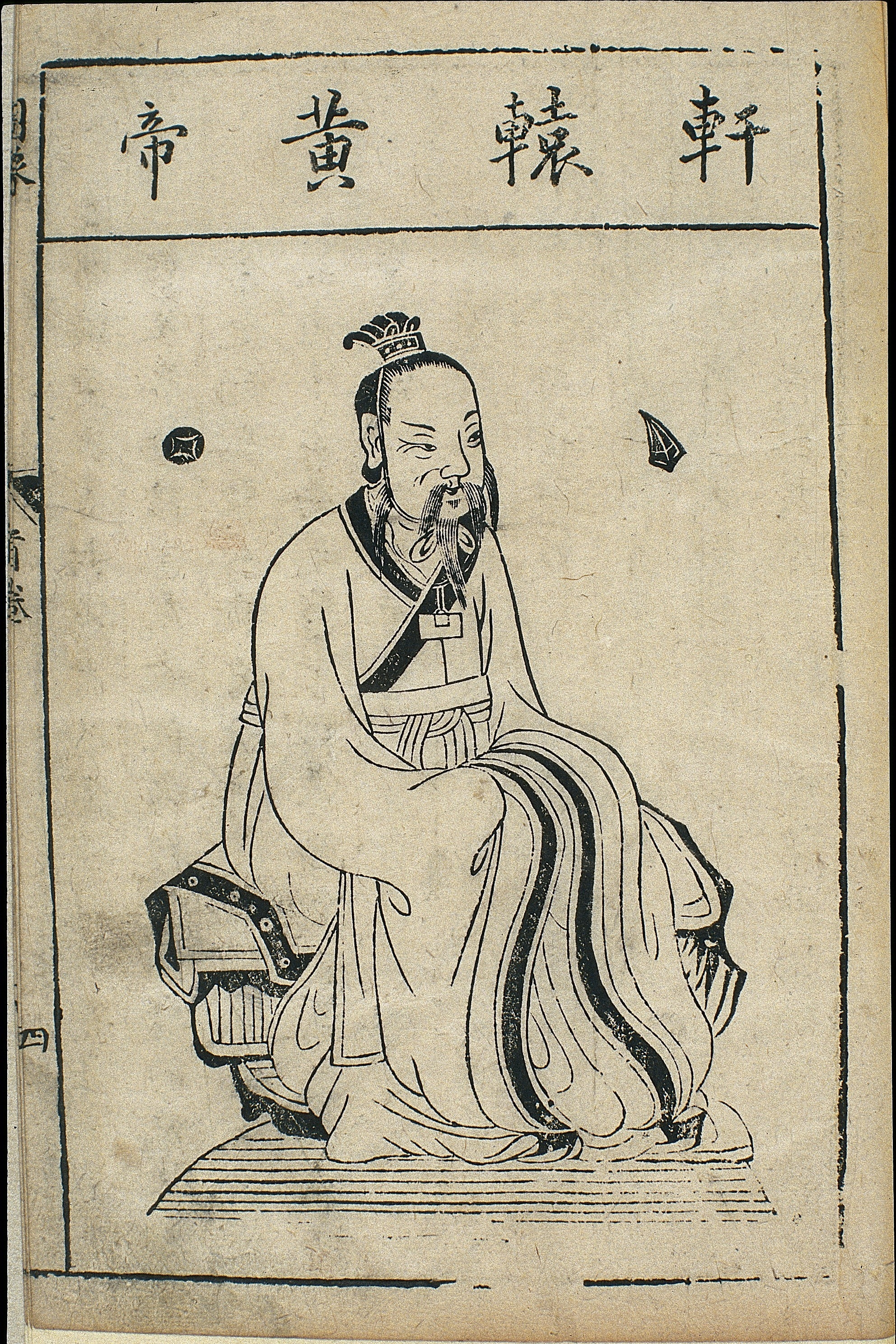
As depicted by Gan Bozong, woodcut print, Tang dynasty (618–907)

The Yellow Emperor, also known as the Yellow Thearch or Huangdi (traditional Chinese: 黃帝; simplified Chinese: 黄帝), was a legendary Chinese leader of the Youxiong clan, a culture hero included among the legendary Three Sovereigns and Five Emperors. He is revered as a deity individually or as part of the Five Regions Highest Deities (Chinese: 五方上帝; pinyin: Wǔfāng Shàngdì) in Chinese folk religion. Regarded as the initiator of Chinese culture, he is traditionally credited with numerous innovations – including the traditional Chinese calendar, Taoism, wooden houses, boats, carts, the compass needle, "the earliest forms of writing", and cuju, a ball game. Calculated by Jesuit missionaries, as based on various Chinese chronicles, Huangdi's traditional reign dates begin in either 2698 or 2697 BC, spanning one hundred years exactly, later accepted by the twentieth-century promoters of a universal calendar starting with the Yellow Emperor.

Huangdi's cult is first attested in the Warring States period, and became prominent late in that same period and into the early Han dynasty, when he was portrayed as the originator of the centralized state, as a cosmic ruler, and as a patron of esoteric arts. A large number of texts – such as the Huangdi Neijing, a medical classic, and the Huangdi Sijing, a group of political treatises – were thus attributed to him. Having waned in influence during most of the imperial period, in the early twentieth century Huangdi became a rallying figure for Han Chinese attempts to overthrow the rule of the Qing dynasty, remaining a powerful symbol within modern Chinese nationalism.

== Names ==
=== Huangdi ===
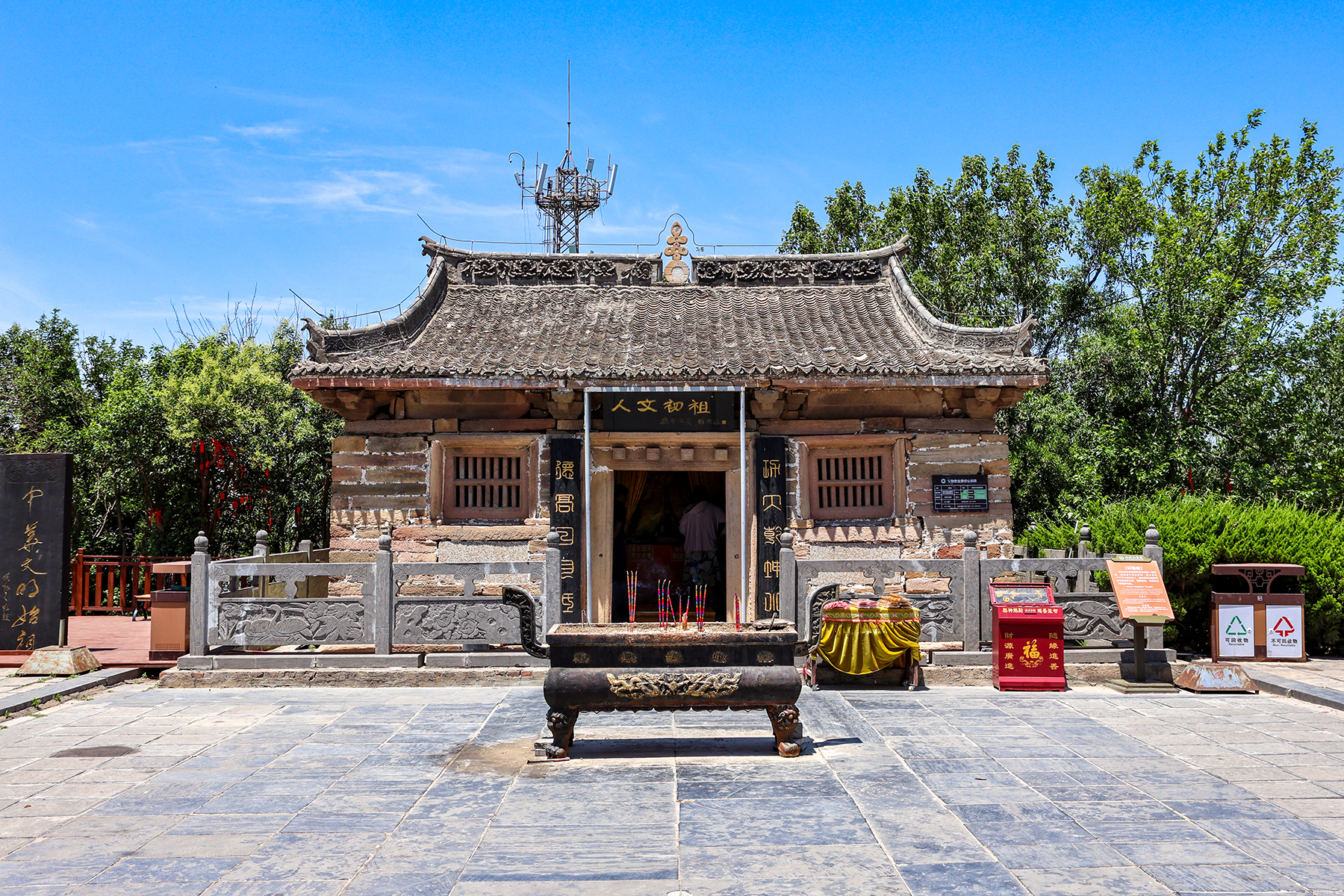
Xuanyuan Temple in the birthplace of Huangdi in Xinzheng, Zhengzhou, Henan

Until 221 BC, when Qin Shi Huang of the Qin dynasty coined the title huangdi (皇帝) – conventionally "emperor" - the character di 帝 did not refer to earthly rulers but to Shangdi, the highest god of the Shang dynasty (c. 1600–1046 BC) pantheon. In the Warring States period (c. 475–221 BC), the term di on its own could also refer to the deities associated with the five Sacred Mountains of China and colors. Huangdi (黃帝), the "yellow di", was one of the latter. To emphasize the religious meaning of di in pre-imperial times, historians of early China commonly translate the god's name as "Yellow Thearch" and the first emperor's title as "August Thearch", in which "thearch" refers to a godly ruler.

In the late Warring States period, the Yellow Emperor was integrated into the cosmological scheme of the Five Phases, in which the color yellow represents the earth phase, the Yellow Dragon, and the center. The correlation of the colors in association with different dynasties was mentioned in the Lüshi Chunqiu (late 3rd century BC), where the Yellow Emperor's reign was seen to be governed by earth. The character huang 黃 ("yellow") was often used as an equivalent to huang 皇, which means "august" (in the sense of 'distinguished') or "radiant", giving Huangdi attributes close to those of Shangdi, the Shang supreme god.

=== Xuanyuan and Youxiong ===
The Records of the Grand Historian, compiled by Sima Qian in the first century BC, gives the Yellow Emperor's name as "Xuan Yuan" (traditional Chinese: 軒轅; simplified Chinese: 轩辕; pinyin: Xuān Yuán < Old Chinese (B-S) *qʰa[r]-[ɢ]ʷa[n], lit. "Chariot Shaft"). Third-century scholar Huangfu Mi, who wrote a work on the sovereigns of antiquity, commented that Xuanyuan was the name of a hill where Huangdi had lived and that he later took as a name. The Classic of Mountains and Seas mentions a Xuanyuan nation whose inhabitants have human faces, snake bodies, and tails twisting above their heads; Yuan Ke, a contemporary scholar of early Chinese mythology, "noted that the appearance of these people is characteristic of gods and suggested that they may reflect the form of the Yellow Thearch himself". The Qing dynasty scholar Liang Yusheng (梁玉繩, 1745–1819) argued instead that the hill was named after the Yellow Emperor. Xuanyuan is also the name of the star Regulus in Chinese, the star being associated with Huangdi in traditional astronomy. He is also associated to the broader constellations Leo and Lynx, of which the latter is said to represent the body of the Yellow Dragon (黃龍 Huánglóng), Huangdi's animal form.

Huangdi was also referred to as "Youxiong" (有熊; Yǒuxióng). This name has been interpreted as either a place name or a clan name. According to British sinologist Herbert Allen Giles (1845–1935), that name was "taken from that of [Huangdi's] hereditary principality". William Nienhauser, a modern translator of the Records of the Grand Historian, states that Huangdi was originally the head of the Youxiong clan, which lived near what is now Xinzheng in Henan. Rémi Mathieu, a French historian of Chinese myths and religion, translates "Youxiong" as "possessor of bears" and links Huangdi to the broader theme of the bear in world mythology. Ye Shuxian has also associated the Yellow Emperor with bear legends common across northeast Asia people as well as the Dangun legend.

=== Other names ===
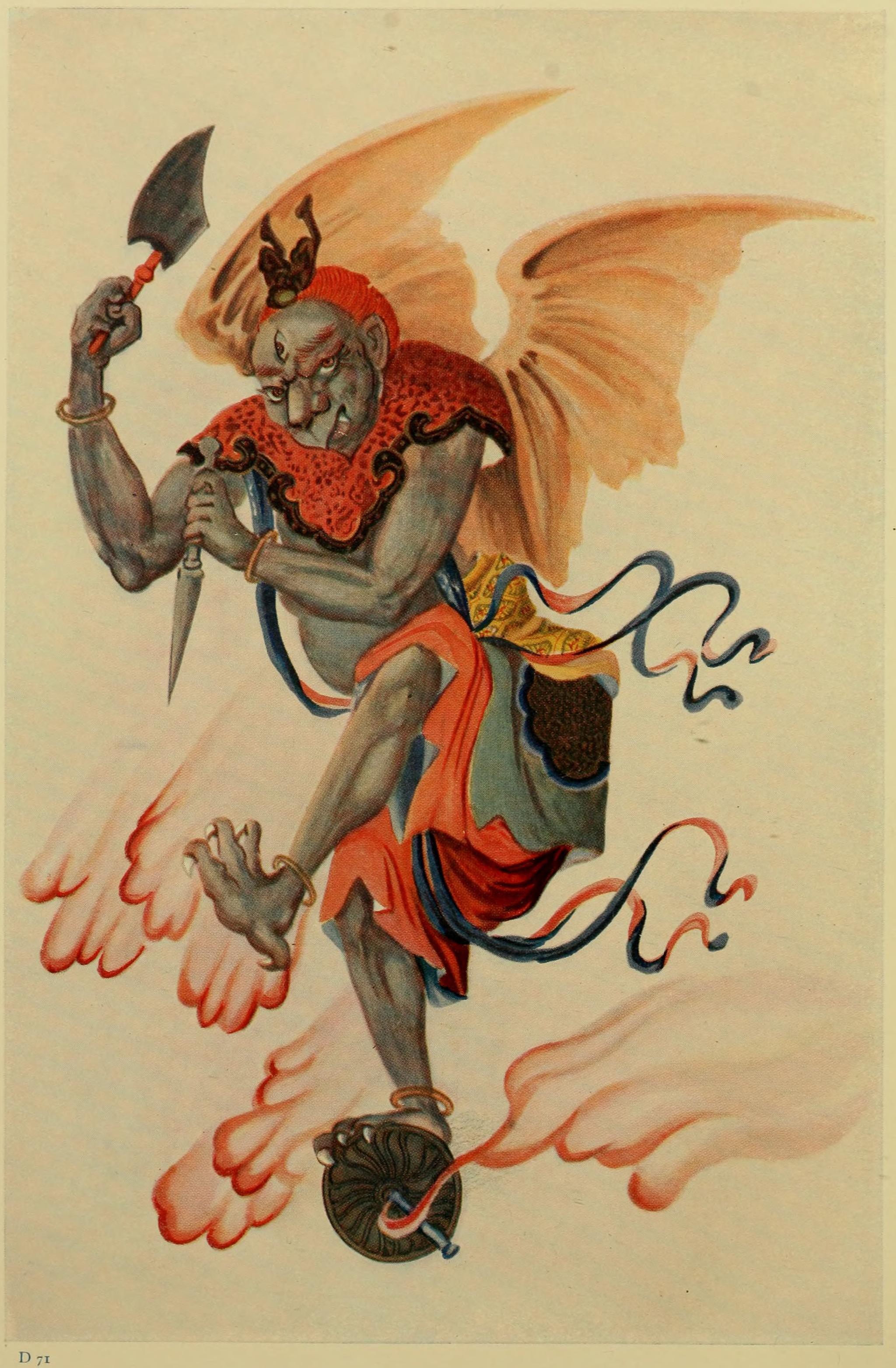
The eagle-faced Thunder God (雷神 Léishén) in a 1923 drawing, punisher of those who go against the order of Heaven

Sima Qian's Records of the Grand Historian describes the Yellow Emperor's family name as Gongsun (公孫). Xu Shen's Shuowen Jiezi, however, describes the Yellow Emperor taking on the family name 姬 Jī after the Ji River he lived close to.

In Han dynasty texts, the Yellow Emperor is also called upon as the "Yellow God" (黃神 Huángshén). Certain accounts interpret him as the incarnation of the "Yellow God of the Northern Dipper" (黄神北斗 Huángshén Běidǒu), (Note: A 斗 dǒu in Chinese is an entire semantic field. Its base meaning is a "dipper" or the shape of one, as the Big Dipper (北斗 Běidǒu). It can also be read as a measure of volume, meaning a "dipperful" in some usages and multiple liters in others. It can also signify a "whirl". In Simplified Chinese characters, 斗 is used to write the word 鬥 (dòu) and its graphical synonyms, which connote "contend", "struggle", "battle".) another name of the universal god (Shangdi 上帝 or Tiandi 天帝). According to a definition in apocryphal texts related to the Hétú 河圖, the Yellow Emperor "proceeds from the essence of the Yellow God".

As a cosmological deity, the Yellow Emperor is known as the "Great Emperor of the Central Peak" (中岳大帝 Zhōngyuè Dàdì), and in the Shizi as the "Yellow Emperor with Four Faces" (黃帝四面 Huángdì Sìmiàn). In old accounts the Yellow Emperor is identified as a deity of light (and his name is explained in the Shuowen jiezi to derive from guāng 光, "light") and thunder, and as one and the same with the "Thunder God" (雷神 Léishén), who in turn, as a later mythological character, is distinguished as the Yellow Emperor's foremost pupil, such as in the Huangdi Neijing.

== Historicity ==
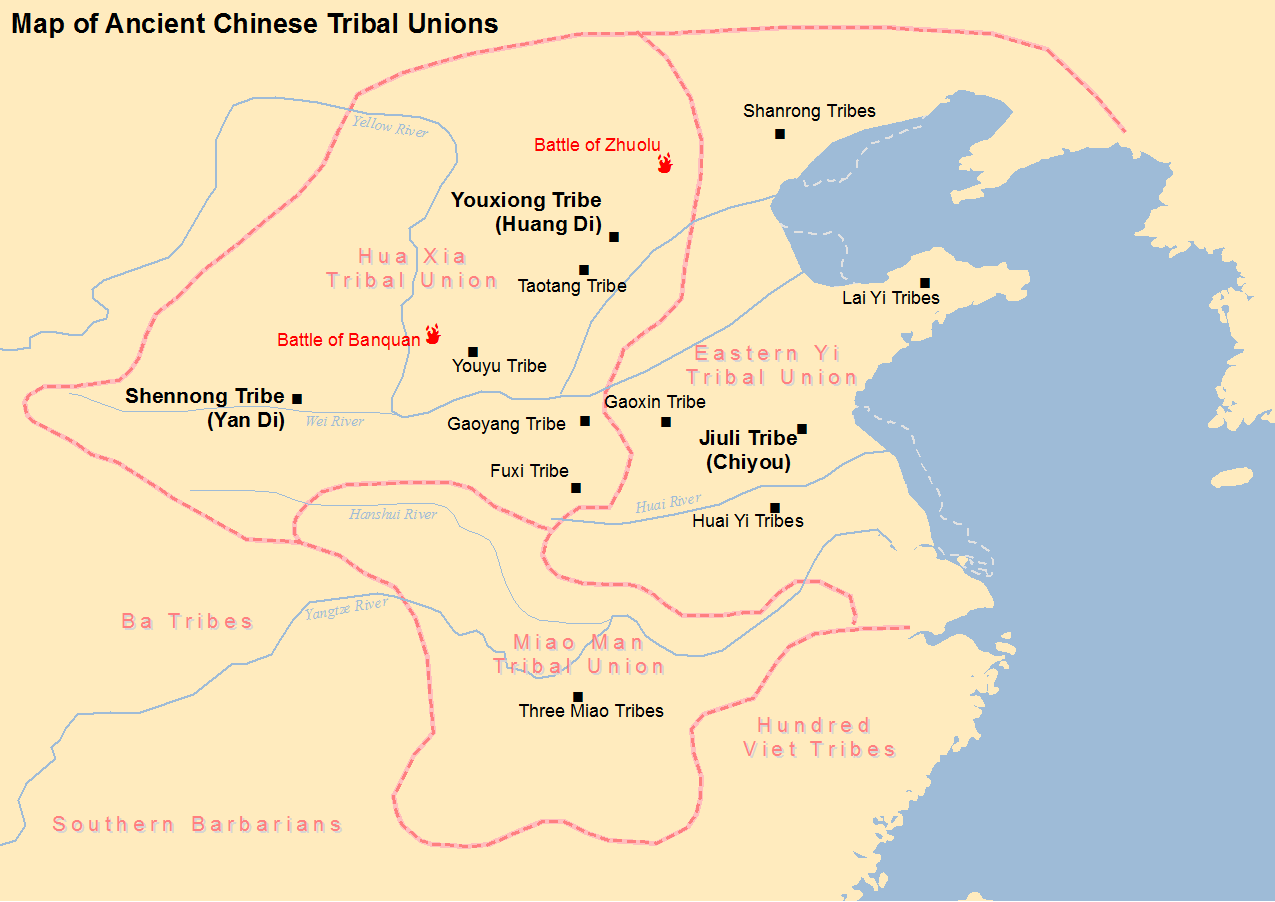
Map of tribes and tribal unions in Ancient China, including tribes of Huang Di (Yellow Emperor), Yan Di (Flame Emperor) and Chiyou

The Chinese historian Sima Qian – and much Chinese historiography following him – considered the Yellow Emperor to be a more historical figure than earlier legendary figures such as Fu Xi, Nüwa, and Shennong. Sima Qian's Records of the Grand Historian begins with the Yellow Emperor, while passing over the others.

Throughout most of Chinese history, the Yellow Emperor and the other ancient sages were considered to be historical figures. Their historicity started to be questioned in the 1920s by historians such as Gu Jiegang, one of the founders of the Doubting Antiquity School in China. In their attempts to prove that the earliest figures of Chinese history were mythological, Gu and his followers argued that these ancient sages were originally gods who were later depicted as humans by the rationalist intellectuals of the Warring States period. Yang Kuan, a member of the same current of historiography, noted that only in the Warring States period had the Yellow Emperor started to be described as the first ruler of China. Yang thus argued that Huangdi was a later transformation of Shangdi, the supreme god of the Shang dynasty's pantheon.

Also in the 1920s, French scholars Henri Maspero and Marcel Granet published critical studies of China's accounts of high antiquity. In his Danses et légendes de la Chine ancienne ["Dances and legends of ancient China"], for example, Granet argued that these tales were "historicized legends" that said more about the time when they were written than about the time they purported to describe.

In the "middle of the [20th] century, a group of" Chinese "historians proposed the theory that [the Three Sovereigns and Five Emperors]" were originally Chinese gods who became thought of as human during the later period of the Zhou dynasty. Most scholars now agree that the Yellow Emperor originated as a god who was later represented as a historical person. K. C. Chang sees Huangdi and other cultural heroes as "ancient religious figures" who were "euhemerized" in the late Warring States and Han periods. Historian of ancient China Mark Edward Lewis speaks of the Yellow Emperor's "earlier nature as a god", whereas Roel Sterckx, a professor at University of Cambridge, calls Huangdi a "legendary cultural hero".

== Origin of the myth ==
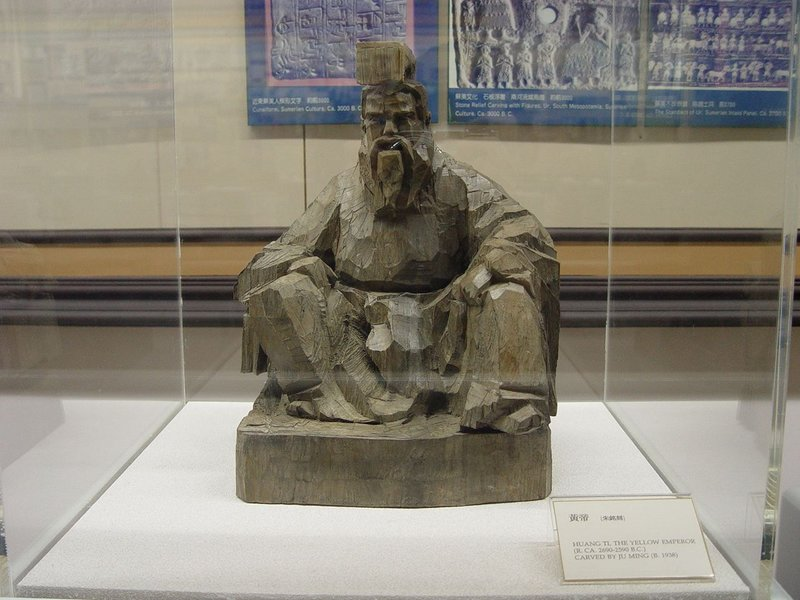
Twentieth-century statue of the Yellow Emperor, carved by Ju Ming on display at the National Palace Museum in Taipei

The origin of Huangdi's mythology is unclear, but historians have formulated several hypotheses about it. Yang Kuan, a member of the Doubting Antiquity School (1920s–40s), argued that the Yellow Emperor was derived from Shangdi, the highest god of the Shang dynasty. Yang reconstructs the etymology as follows: Shangdi 上帝 → Huang Shangdi 皇上帝 → Huangdi 皇帝 → Huangdi 黄帝, in which he claims that huáng 黃 ("yellow") either was a variant Chinese character for huáng 皇 ("august") or was used as a way to avoid the naming taboo for the latter. Yang's view has been criticized by Mitarai Masaru and by Michael Puett.

Historian Mark Edward Lewis agrees that huáng 黄 and huáng 皇 were often interchangeable, but disagreeing with Yang, he claims that huáng meaning "yellow" appeared first. Based on what he admits is a "novel etymology" likening huáng 黄 to the phonetically close wāng 尪 (the "burned shaman" in Shang rainmaking rituals), Lewis suggests that "huáng" in "Huangdi" might originally have meant "rainmaking shaman" or "rainmaking ritual." Citing late Warring States and early Han versions of Huangdi's myth, he further argues that the figure of the Yellow Emperor originated in ancient rain-making rituals in which Huangdi represented the power of rain and clouds, whereas his mythical rival Chiyou (or the Yan Emperor) stood for fire and drought.

Also disagreeing with Yang Kuan's hypothesis, Sarah Allan finds it unlikely that such a popular myth as the Yellow Emperor's could have come from a taboo character. She argues instead that pre-Shang "'history'," including the story of the Yellow Emperor, "can all be understood as a later transformation and systematization of Shang mythology." In her view, Huangdi was originally an unnamed "lord of the underworld" (or the "Yellow Springs"), the mythological counterpart of the Shang sky deity Shangdi. At the time, Shang rulers claimed that their mythical ancestors, identified with "the [ten] suns, birds, east, life, [and] the Lord on High" (i.e., Shangdi), had defeated an earlier people associated with "the underworld, dragons, west." After the Zhou dynasty overthrew the Shang dynasty in the eleventh century BC, Zhou leaders reinterpreted Shang myths as meaning that the Shang had vanquished a real political dynasty, which was eventually named the Xia dynasty. By Han times – as seen in Sima Qian's account in the Shiji – the Yellow Emperor, who as lord of the underworld had been symbolically linked to the Xia, had become a historical ruler whose descendants were thought to have founded the Xia.

Given that the earliest extant mention of the Yellow Emperor was on a fourth-century BC Chinese bronze inscription (Note: Specifically, the inscription on the Chen Hou Yinqi dui (陳侯因齊敦), cast by King Wei of Qi (r. 356–320 BCE).) claiming that he was the ancestor of the royal house of the state of Qi, Lothar von Falkenhausen speculates that Huangdi was invented as an ancestral figure as part of a strategy to claim that all ruling clans in the "Zhou dynasty culture sphere" shared common ancestry.

== History of Huangdi ==
=== Earliest mention ===
Explicit accounts of the Yellow Emperor started to appear in Chinese texts during the Warring States period. The earliest extant mention of Huangdi is an inscription on the Chen Hou Yinqi dui (陳侯因齊敦), cast during the first half of the fourth century BC by the royal family (surnamed Tian 田) of the state of Qi, a powerful eastern state. As the Tian family had usurped the throne of Qi, establishing such a divine heritage would positively affect their claim to legitimacy.

Harvard University historian Michael Puett writes that the Qi bronze inscription was one of several references to the Yellow Emperor in the fourth and third centuries BC within accounts of the creation of the state. Noting that many of the thinkers who were later identified as precursors of the Huang–Lao – "Huangdi and Laozi" – tradition came from the state of Qi, Robin D. S. Yates hypothesizes that Huang–Lao originated in that region.

=== Warring States period ===
The cult of Huangdi became very popular during the Warring States period (5th century – 221 BC), a period of intense competition between rival states which ended with the unification of the realm by the state of Qin. In addition to his role as ancestor, he became associated with "centralized statecraft" and emerged as a figure paradigmatic of emperorship.

=== The state of Qin ===
In his Shiji, Sima Qian claims that the state of Qin started worshipping the Yellow Emperor in the fifth century BC, along with Yandi, the Fiery Emperor. The altars were established at Yong 雍 (near modern Fengxiang County in Shaanxi province), which was the capital of Qin from 677 to 383 BC. By the time of King Zheng, who became king of Qin in 247 BC and First Emperor of a unified China in 221 BC, Huangdi had become by far the most important of the four "thearchs" (di 帝) who were then worshiped at Yong.

=== The Shiji version ===
The Shiji (史記) begins with the Basic Annals of the Five Emperors (五帝本紀), which opens with the Yellow Emperor. At the end of this part, Sima Qian, author of the Shiji, acknowledged the difficulty of verifying the Yellow Emperor's existence due to unreliable legends. To authenticate the history, he conducted field research at sites like Zhuolu and Kongtong. His core methodology was cross-verification: he concluded that oral traditions which aligned with ancient texts were generally credible. Based on this standard, he selected the most "refined" accounts to compile the Basic Annals.

According to the Shiji, the Yellow Emperor, named Xuanyuan (軒轅) (surname Gongsun, 公孫), was the son of Shaodian (少典). Described as possessing a divine nature and great intelligence from birth, he grew into a wise and capable leader. During the decline of the Shennong (神農) clan, feudal lords fought among themselves, and the Flame Emperor (Yandi, 炎帝) sought to oppress them. Xuanyuan cultivated virtue and trained an army to oppose him. He fought the Flame Emperor at the Battle of Banquan (阪泉) and, after three engagements, emerged victorious.

When the violent chieftain Chi You (蚩尤) rebelled, Xuanyuan levied the armies of the feudal lords and defeated him at the Battle of Zhuolu (涿鹿), capturing and executing him. Following this victory, the lords honored Xuanyuan as the "Yellow Emperor" to replace the Shennong dynasty, and he became the ruler of the realm.

The Emperor established a vast domain extending to the sea in the east and the Yangtze River in the south. He appointed officials titled "Cloud Officers" (雲) and performed frequent sacrifices to spirits and mountains. With the aid of ministers such as Feng Hou (風后), he regulated the calendar and guided the people in the timely sowing of grains and the use of natural resources. He was titled the "Yellow Emperor" because his reign corresponded to the auspicious Earth Virtue (associated with the color yellow).

The Yellow Emperor had twenty-five sons. His primary consort, Leizu (嫘祖), bore him two sons: Xuanxiao (玄囂) and Changyi (昌意). Upon the Yellow Emperor's death (buried at Mount Qiao, 橋山), he was succeeded by his grandson Gaoyang (高陽) (the son of Changyi), who became Emperor Zhuanxu (顓頊).

=== Imperial era ===
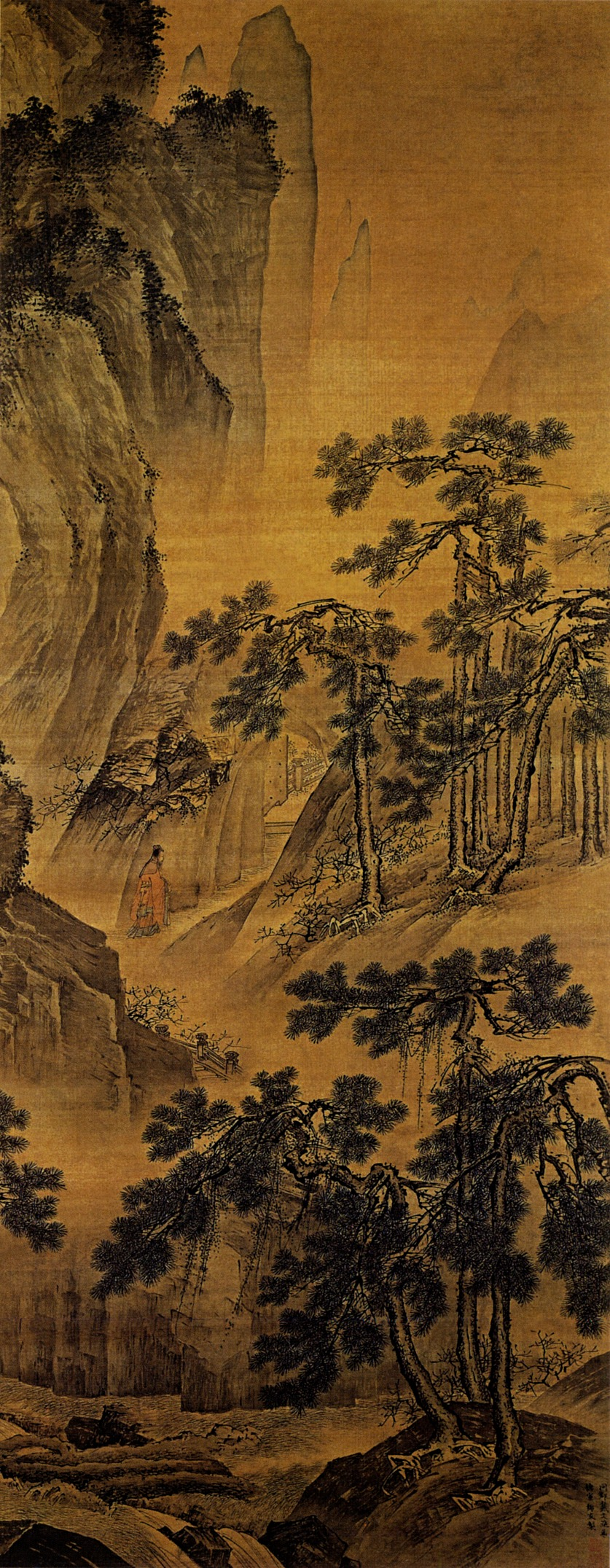
Inquiring of the Dao at the Cave of Paradise, hanging scroll, color on silk, 210.5 x 83 cm by Dai Jin (1388–1462). This painting is based on the story, first recounted in the Zhuangzi, that the Yellow Emperor traveled to the Kongtong Mountains to inquire about the Dao with the Daoist sage Guangchengzi.

The Dai Dai Liji (大戴禮記), compiled by Dai De towards the end of the Western Han dynasty, carries a quote attributed to Confucius:

生而民得其利百年, 死而民畏其神百年, 亡而民用其教百年, 故曰三百年.

Translation:

When [the Yellow Emperor] was alive, people benefited from his rule for a hundred years; after he died, people stood in awe of his spirit for a hundred years; after [his spirit] disappeared, people used his teachings for a hundred years. For this reason, people say [that the Yellow Emperor lived for] three hundred years.

The Yellow Emperor was credited with an enormous number of cultural legacies and esoteric teachings. While Taoism is often regarded in the West as arising from Laozi, many Chinese Taoists claim the Yellow Emperor formulated many of their precepts, including the quest for "long life". The Yellow Emperor's Inner Canon (黃帝內經 Huángdì Nèijīng), which presents the doctrinal basis of traditional Chinese medicine, was named after him. He was also credited with composing the Four Books of the Yellow Emperor (黃帝四經 Huángdì Sìjīng), the Yellow Emperor's Book of the Hidden Symbol (黃帝陰符經 Huángdì Yīnfújīng), and the "Yellow Emperor's Four Seasons Poem (軒轅黃帝四季詩)" included in the Tung Shing fortune-telling almanac.

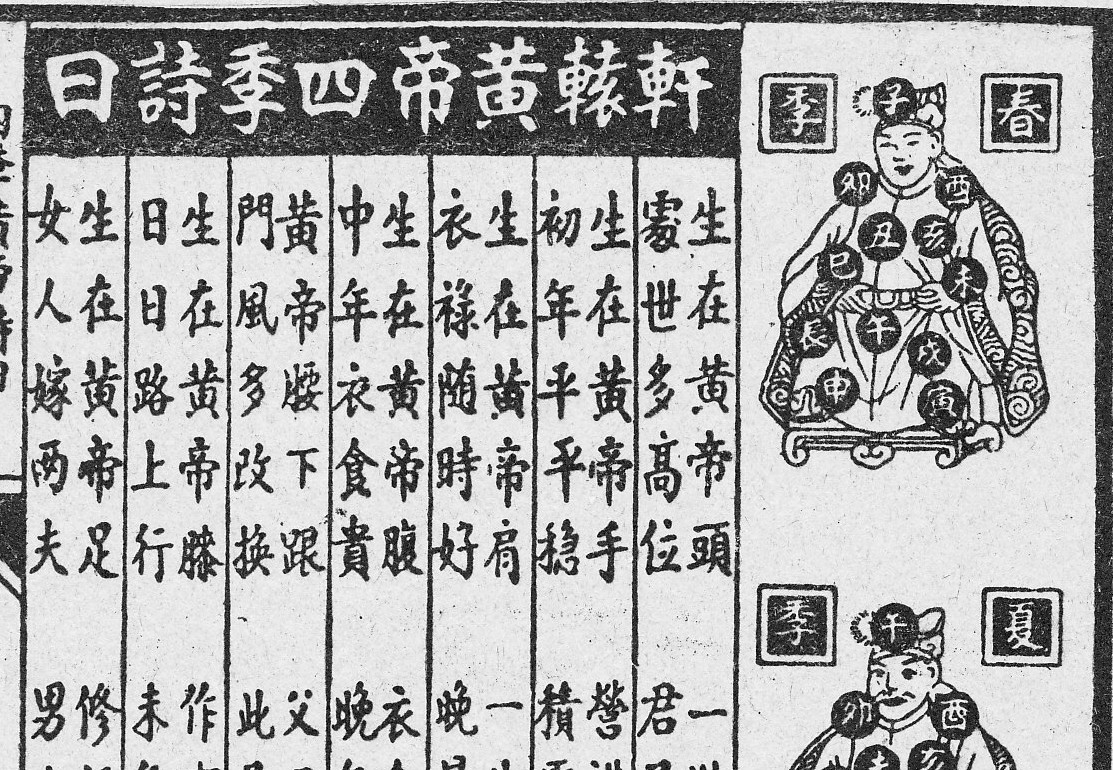
A section of the four seasons poem from the Tung Shing, which is believed to have fortune telling properties.

"Xuanyuan (+ number)" is also the Chinese name for Regulus and other stars of the constellations Leo and Lynx, of which the latter is said to represent the body of the Yellow Dragon. In the Hall of Supreme Harmony in Beijing's Forbidden City, there is also a mirror called the "Xuanyuan Mirror".

=== In Taoism ===
In the second century AD, Huangdi's role as a deity was diminished because of the rise of a deified Laozi. A state sacrifice offered to "Huang-Lao jun" was not offered to Huangdi and Laozi, as the term Huang-Lao would have meant a few centuries earlier, "yellow Laozi". Nonetheless, Huangdi kept being considered as an immortal: he was seen as a master of longevity techniques and as a god who could reveal new teachings – in the form of texts such as the sixth-century Huangdi Yinfujing – to his earthly followers.

=== Twentieth century ===
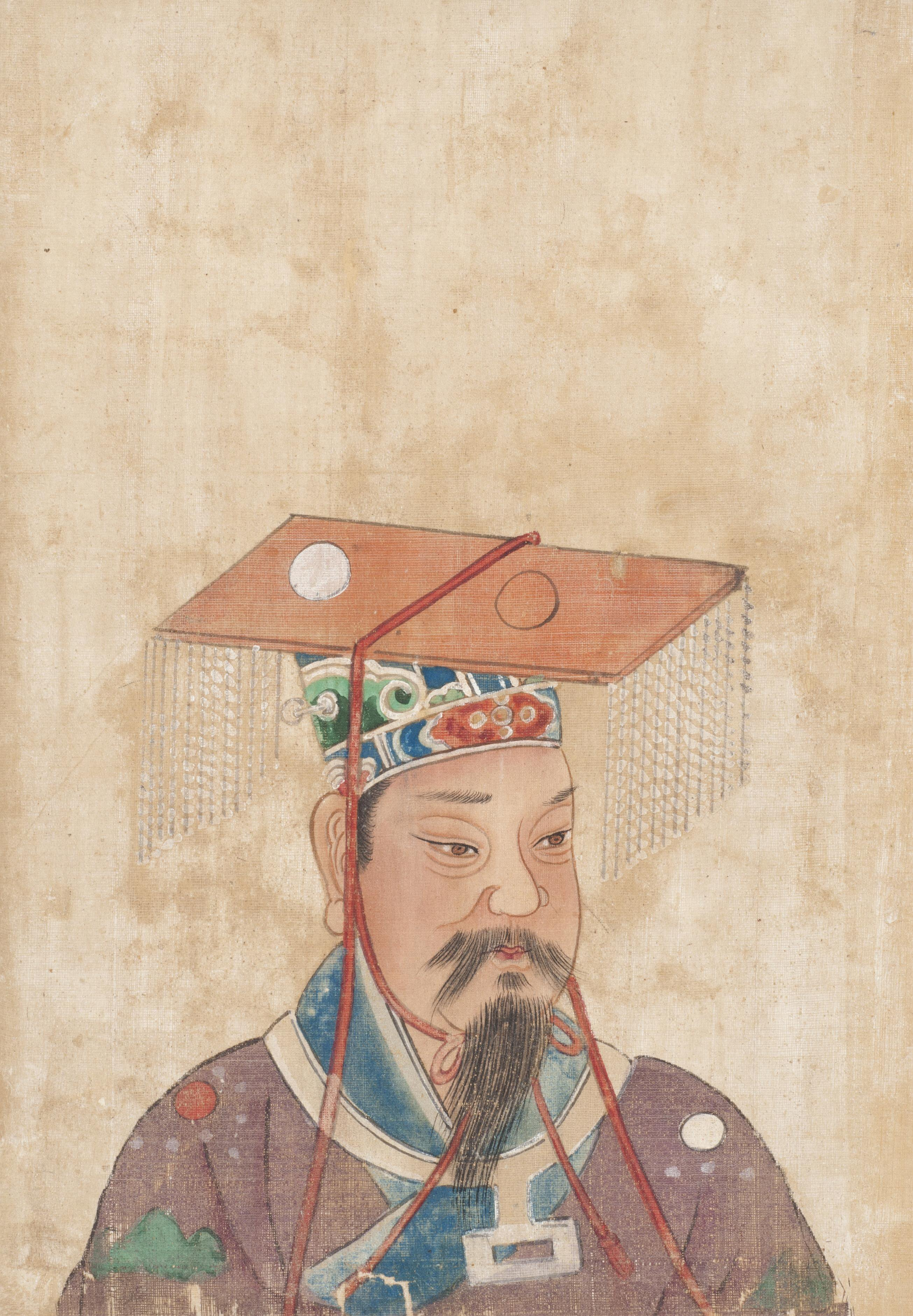
As depicted in the album Portraits of Famous Men c. 1900 CE, housed in the Philadelphia Museum of Art

The Yellow Emperor became a powerful national symbol in the last decade of the Qing dynasty (1644–1911) and remained dominant in Chinese nationalist discourse throughout the Republican period (1912–1949). The early twentieth century is also when the Yellow Emperor was first referred to as the ancestor of all Chinese people.

==== Late Qing ====
Starting in 1903, radical publications started using the projected date of his birth as the first year of the Chinese calendar. Intellectuals such as Liu Shipei (1884–1919) found this practice necessary in order to "preserve the [Han] race" (baozhong 保種) from both dominance by Manchu people and foreign encroachment. Revolutionaries motivated by Anti-Manchuism such as Chen Tianhua (1875–1905), Zou Rong (1885–1905), and Zhang Binglin (1868–1936) tried to foster the racial consciousness they thought was missing from their compatriots, and thus depicted the Manchus as racially inferior barbarians who were unfit to rule over Han Chinese. Chen's widely circulated pamphlets claimed that the "Han race" formed one big family descended from the Yellow Emperor. The first issue (Nov. 1905) of the Minbao 民報 ("People's Journal"), which was founded in Tokyo by revolutionaries of the Tongmenghui, featured the Yellow Emperor on its cover and called Huangdi "the first great nationalist of the world." It was one of several nationalist magazines that featured the Yellow Emperor on their cover in the early twentieth century. The fact that Huangdi meant "yellow" emperor also served to buttress the theory that he was the originator of the "yellow race".

Many historians interpret this sudden popularity of the Yellow Emperor as a reaction to the theories of French scholar Albert Terrien de Lacouperie (1845–94), who in a book called The Western Origin of the Early Chinese Civilization, from 2300 B.C. to 200 A.D. (1892) had claimed that Chinese civilization was founded around 2300 BCE by Babylonian immigrants. Lacouperie's "Sino-Babylonianism" posited that Huangdi was King Nakhunte, a Mesopotamian tribal leader who had led a massive migration of his people, from the Bak ethnic group, into China around 2300 BC and founded what later became Chinese civilization. European sinologists quickly rejected these theories, but in 1900 two Japanese historians, Shirakawa Jirō and Kokubu Tanenori, omitted these criticisms and published a long summary that presented Lacouperie's views as the most advanced Western scholarship on China. Chinese scholars were quickly attracted by "the historicization of Chinese mythology" that the two Japanese authors advocated.

Anti-Manchu intellectuals and activists who searched for China's "national essence" (guocui 國粹) adapted Sino-Babylonianism to their needs. Zhang Binglin explained Huangdi's battle with Chi You as a conflict opposing the newly arrived civilized Mesopotamians to backward local tribes, a battle that transformed China into one of the most civilized places in the world. Zhang's reinterpretation of Sima Qian's account "underscored the need to recover the glory of early China." Liu Shipei also presented these early times as the golden age of Chinese civilization. In addition to tying the Chinese to an ancient center of human civilization in Mesopotamia, Lacouperie's theories suggested that China should be ruled by the descendants of Huangdi. In a controversial essay called History of the Yellow Race (Huangshi 黃史), which was published serially from 1905 to 1908, Huang Jie (黃節; 1873–1935) claimed that the "Han race" was the true master of China because it was descended from the Yellow Emperor. Reinforced by the values of filial piety and the Chinese patrilineal clan, the racial vision defended by Huang and others turned vengeance against the Manchus into a duty owed to one's ancestors.

==== Republican period ====
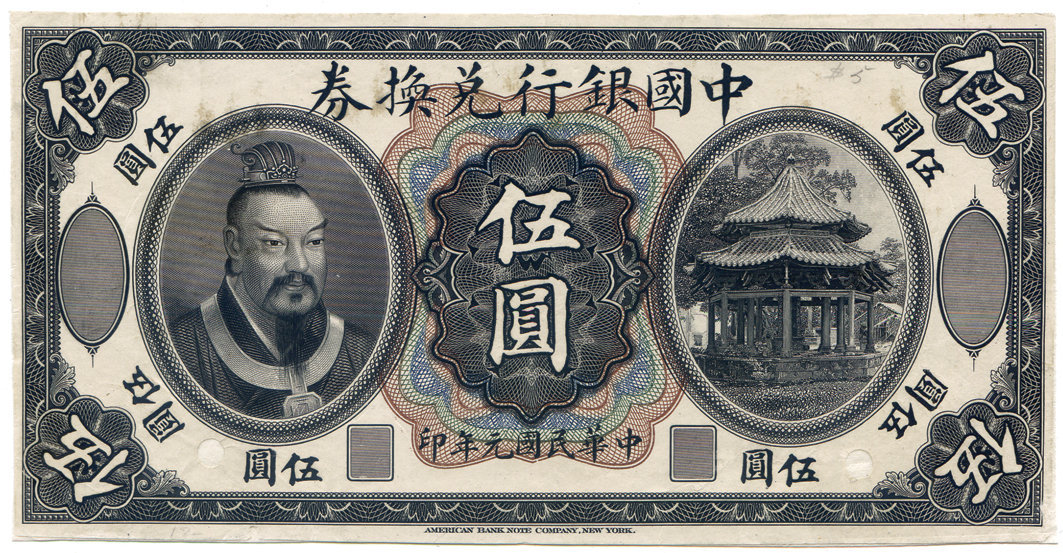
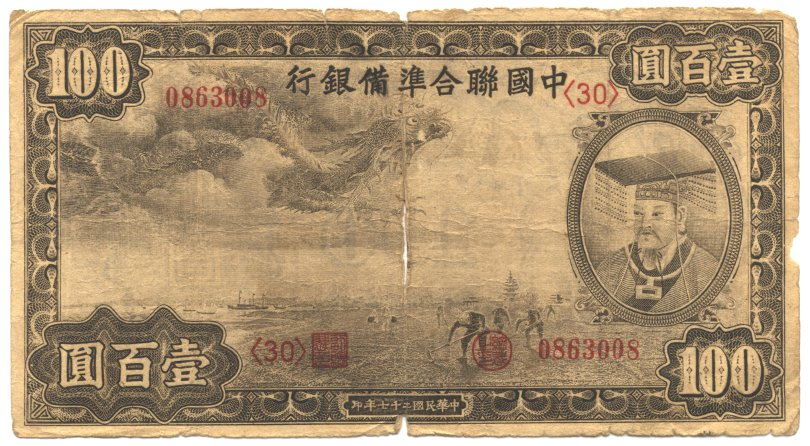
Top image: A five-yuan banknote carrying the effigy of the Yellow Emperor, issued in 1912 by the government of the newly established Republic of China
Bottom image: A 100-yuan banknote displaying the Yellow Emperor, issued in 1938 by the Federal Reserve Bank of China of the Provisional Government of the Republic of China (1937–40), a Japanese puppet regime in North China

The Yellow Emperor continued to be revered after the 1911 Revolution, which overthrew the Qing dynasty. In 1912, for instance, banknotes carrying Huangdi's effigy were issued by the new Republican government. After 1911, however, the Yellow Emperor as national symbol changed from first progenitor of the Han race to ancestor of China's entire multi-ethnic population. Under the ideology of the Five Races Under One Union, Huangdi became the common ancestor of the Han Chinese, the Manchu people, the Mongols, the Tibetans, and the Hui people, who were said to form the Zhonghua minzu, a broadly understood Chinese nation. Sixteen state ceremonies were held between 1911 and 1949 to Huangdi as the "founding ancestor of the Chinese nation" (中華民族始祖) and even "the founding ancestor of human civilization" (人文始祖).

=== Modern significance ===
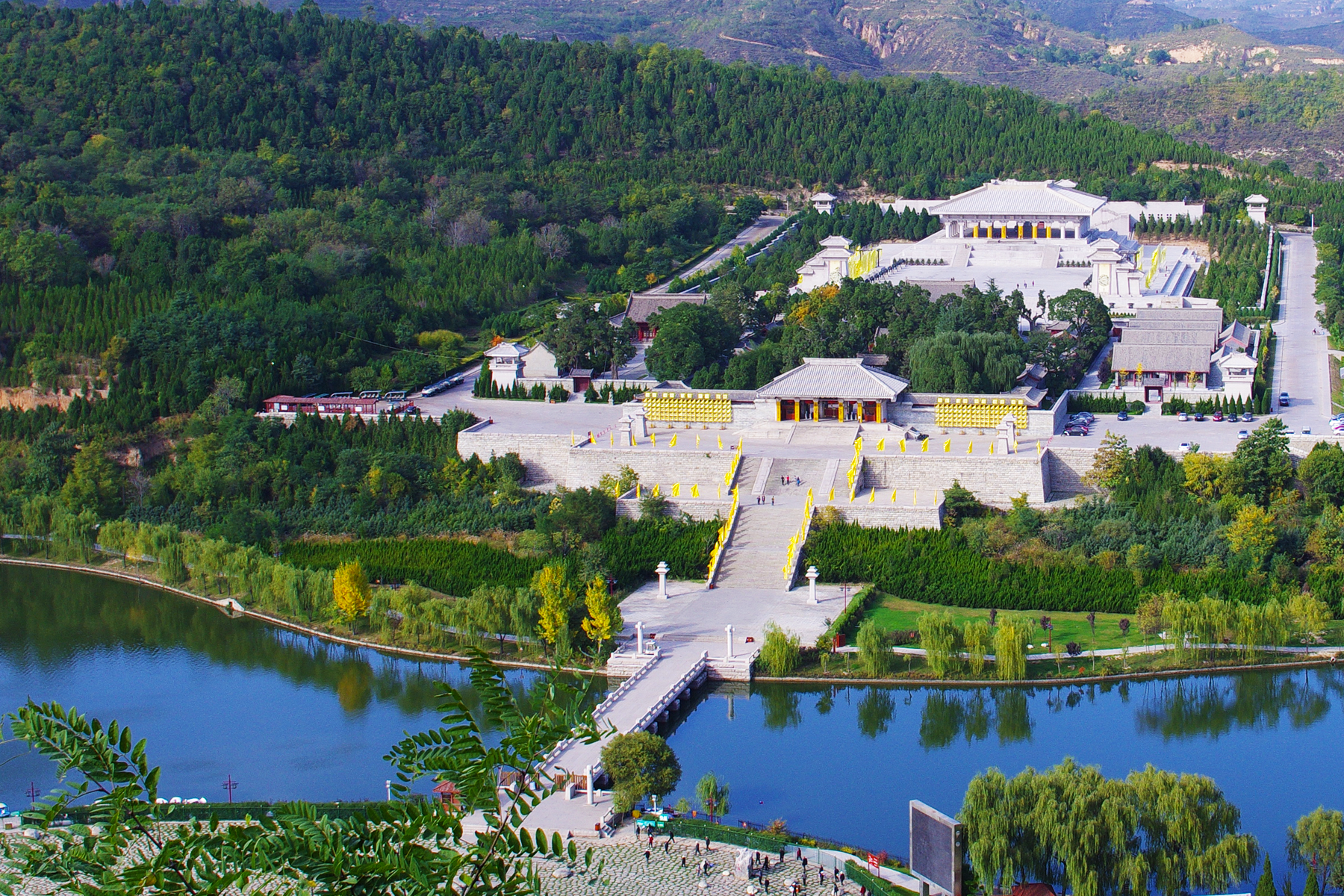
Mausoleum of Huangdi in Huangling, Yan'an, Shaanxi

The cult of the Yellow Emperor was forbidden in the People's Republic of China until the end of the Cultural Revolution. The prohibition was halted during the 1980s when the government reversed itself and resurrected the "Yellow Emperor cult". Starting in the 1980s, the cult was revived and phrases relating to the "Descendants of Yan and Huang" were sometimes used by the Chinese state when referring to people of Chinese descent. In 1984, for example, Deng Xiaoping argued for Chinese unification saying "Taiwan is rooted in the hearts of the descendants of the Yellow Emperor," whereas in 1986 the PRC acclaimed the Chinese-American astronaut Taylor Wang as the first of the Yellow Emperor's descendants to travel in space. In the first half of the 1980s, the Party had internally debated whether this usage would make ethnic minorities feel excluded. After consulting experts from Beijing University, the Chinese Academy of Social Science, and the Central Nationalities Institute, the Central Propaganda Department recommended on 27 March 1985, that the Party speak of the Zhonghua Minzu – the "Chinese nation" broadly defined – in official statements, but that the phrase "sons and grand-sons of Yandi and the Yellow Emperor" could be used in informal statements by party leaders and in "relations with Hong Kong and Taiwanese compatriots and overseas Chinese compatriots". Worship of the Yellow Emperor increased substantially in the 1980s, especially with the financial support of overseas Chinese.

After retreating to Taiwan in late 1949 at the end of the Chinese Civil War, Chiang Kai-shek and the Kuomintang (KMT) ruled that the Republic of China (ROC) would keep paying homage to the Yellow Emperor on 4 April, the National Tomb Sweeping Day, but neither he nor the three presidents that succeeded him ever paid homage in person. In 1955, the KMT, which was led by Mandarin speakers and still poised on retaking the mainland from the Communists, sponsored the production of the movie Children of the Yellow Emperor (Huangdi zisun 黃帝子孫), which was filmed mostly in Taiwanese Hokkien and showed extensive passages of Taiwanese folk opera. Directed by Bai Ke (1914–1964), a former assistant of Yuan Muzhi, it was a propaganda effort to convince speakers of Taiyu that they were linked to mainland people by common blood. In 2009 Ma Ying-jeou was the first ROC president to celebrate the Tomb Sweeping Day rituals for Huangdi in person, on which occasion he proclaimed that both Chinese culture and common descent from the Yellow Emperor united people from Taiwan and the mainland. Later the same year, Lien Chan – a former Vice President of the Republic of China who is now Honorary Chairman of the Kuomintang – and his wife Lien Fang Yu paid homage at the Mausoleum of the Yellow Emperor in Huangling, Yan'an, in mainland China.

Ji Yun (1724–1805) mentioned in his popular Yuewei caotang biji (閱微草堂筆記; 'The Thatched Study of Close Scrutiny') that some claimed "loving underage males began with the Yellow Emperor" (孌童始黄帝), a claim that Ji dismissed.

Today, Xuanyuanjiao based on Taiwan represents an organised form of Yellow Emperor worship married to Confucian orthodoxy.

== Elements of Huangdi's myth ==
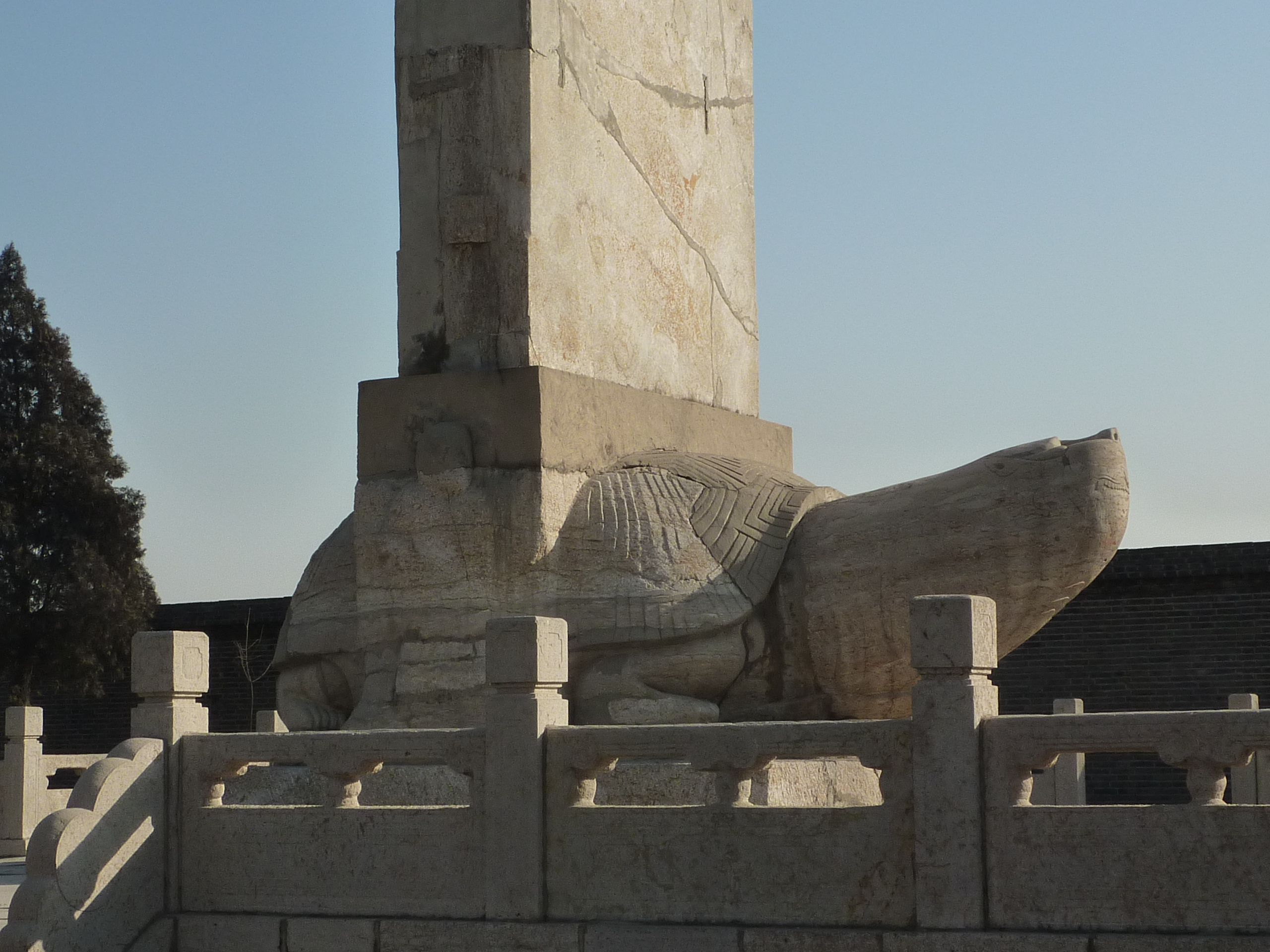
One of the two turtle-based steles at Shou Qiu, Qufu, Shandong, the legendary birthplace of the Yellow Emperor

As with any myth, there are numerous versions of Huangdi's story, emphasizing different themes and interpreting the main character's significance in different ways.

=== Birth ===
According to Huangfu Mi (215–282), the Yellow Emperor was born in Shou Qiu ("Longevity Hill"), which is today on the outskirts of the city of Qufu in Shandong. Early on, he lived with his tribe near the Ji River – Edwin Pulleyblank states that "there seems to be no record of a Ji River outside the myth" – and later migrated to Zhuolu in modern-day Hebei. He then became a farmer and tamed six different special beasts: the bear (熊), the brown bear (罴; 羆), the pí (貔) and xiū (貅) (which later combined to form the mythical Pixiu), the ferocious chū (貙), and the tiger (虎).

Huangdi is sometimes said to have been the fruit of extraordinary birth, as his mother Fubao conceived him as she was aroused, while walking in the country, by a lightning bolt from the Big Dipper. She delivered her son on the mount of Shou (Longevity) or mount Xuanyuan, after which he was named.

Another story states that "Huang Di came into being when the energies that instigated the beginning of the world merged with one another, and created human beings by placing earthen statues at the cardinal points of the world and leaving them exposed for 300 years. During that time, the statues became filled with the breath of creation and eventually began to move [after the 300 years]. Huang Di...received his magic powers when he was 100 years old. He [became a xian] and, riding a dragon, rose to heaven where he became one of the five [Wufang Shangdi]. Huang Di himself rules over the fifth cardinal point, the centre."

=== Achievements ===
In traditional Chinese accounts, the Yellow Emperor is credited with teaching his people how to build shelters, tame wild animals, and grow the Five Grains, although other accounts credit Shennong with the last. He invents carts, boats, and clothing.

Other inventions credited to the emperor include the Chinese diadem (冠冕), throne rooms (宮室), the bow sling, early Chinese astronomy, the Chinese calendar, math calculations, code of sound laws (音律), coins and the concept of money, and cuju, an early Chinese version of football. He is also sometimes said to have been partially responsible for the invention of the guqin zither, although others credit the Yan Emperor with inventing instruments for Ling Lun's compositions.

There are other major traditions where Fuxi was the one who invented the calendar and the Yellow Emperor merely reformed and intercalated it.

In traditional accounts, he also goads the historian Cangjie into creating the first Chinese character writing system, the Oracle bone script, and his principal wife Leizu invents sericulture and teaches his people how to weave silk and dye clothes.

At one point in his reign the Yellow Emperor allegedly visited the mythical East sea and met a talking beast called the Bai Ze who taught him the knowledge of all supernatural creatures. This beast explained to him there were 11,522 (or 1,522) kinds of supernatural creatures.

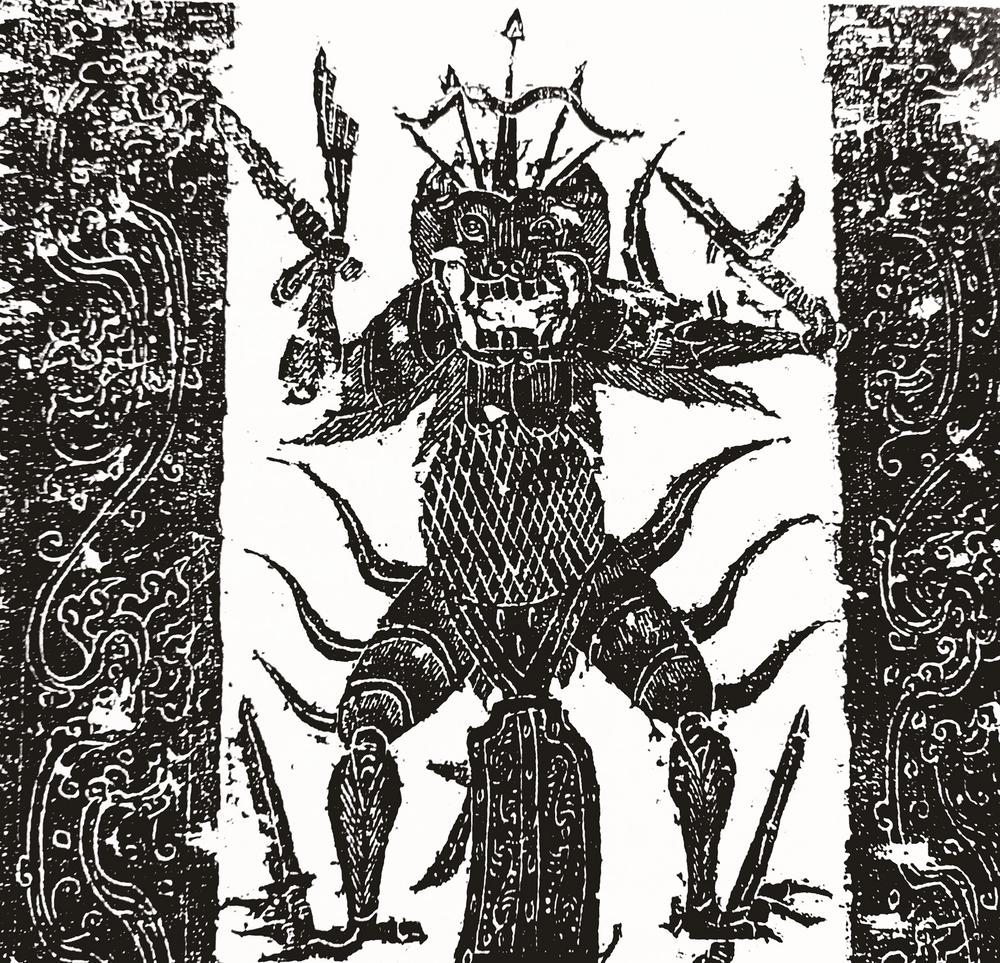
Chiyou, the monstrous war god opponent of The Yellow Emperor at the Battle of Zhuolu, here depicted in a Han-dynasty tomb relief

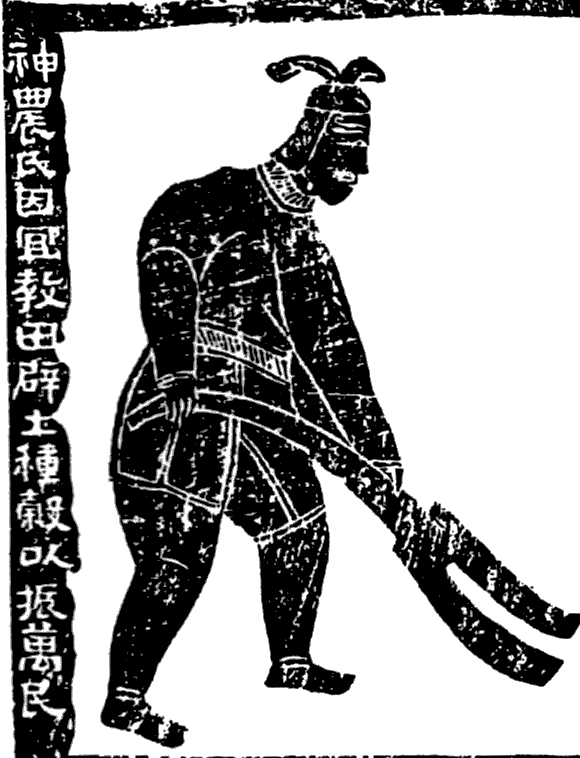
Yandi, the divine farmer opponent of The Yellow Emperor at the Battle of Banquan, here depicted in a Han-dynasty tomb relief

=== Battles ===
The Yellow Emperor and the Yan Emperor were both leaders of a tribe or a combination of two tribes near the Yellow River. The Yan Emperor hailed from a different area around the Jiang River, which a geographical work called the Shuijingzhu identified as a stream near Qishan in what was the Zhou homeland before they defeated the Shang. Both emperors lived in a time of warfare. The Yan Emperor proving unable to control the disorder within his realm, the Yellow Emperor took up arms to establish his domination over various warring factions.

According to traditional accounts, the Yan Emperor meets the force of the "Nine Li" (九黎) under their bronze-headed leader, Chiyou, and his 81 horned and four-eyed brothers and suffers a decisive defeat. He flees to Zhuolu and begs the Yellow Emperor for help. During the ensuing Battle of Zhuolu the Yellow Emperor employs his tamed animals and Chi You darkens the sky by breathing out a thick fog. This leads the emperor to develop the south-pointing chariot, which he uses to lead his army out of the miasma. He next calls upon the drought demon Nüba to dispel Chi You's storm. He then destroys the Nine Li and defeats Chi You. Later he engages in battle with the Yan Emperor, defeating him at the Battle of Banquan and replacing him as the primary ruler.

=== Death ===
The Yellow Emperor was said to have lived for over a hundred years before meeting a phoenix and a qilin and then dying. Two tombs were built in Shaanxi within the Mausoleum of the Yellow Emperor, in addition to others in Henan, Hebei and Gansu.

Modern-day Chinese people sometimes refer to themselves as the "Descendants of Yan and Yellow Emperor", although non-Han minority groups in China may have their own myths or not count as descendants of the emperor.

== Meaning as a deity ==
=== Symbol of the centre of the universe ===
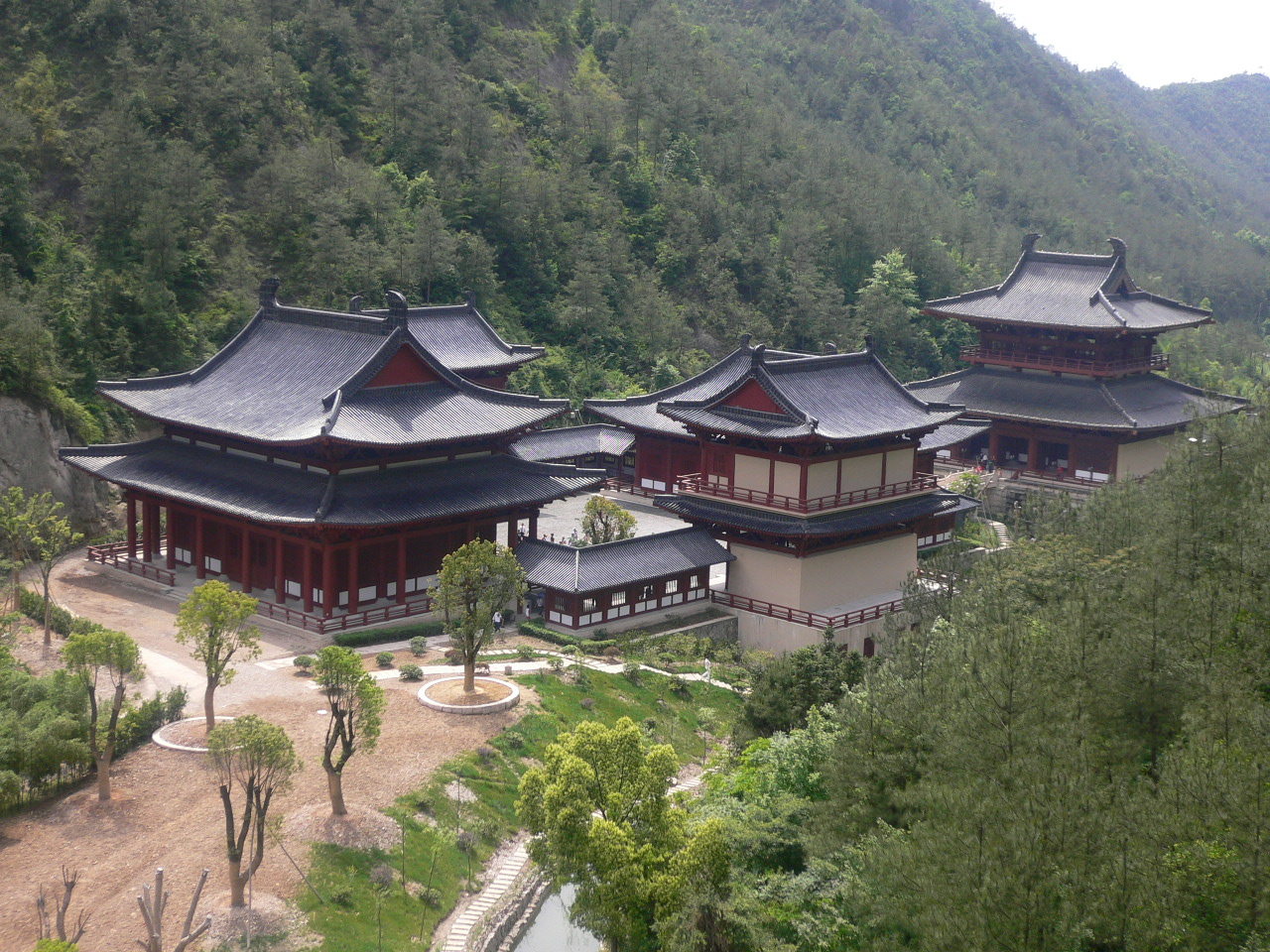
Temple of Huangdi in Jinyun, Lishui, Zhejiang, China

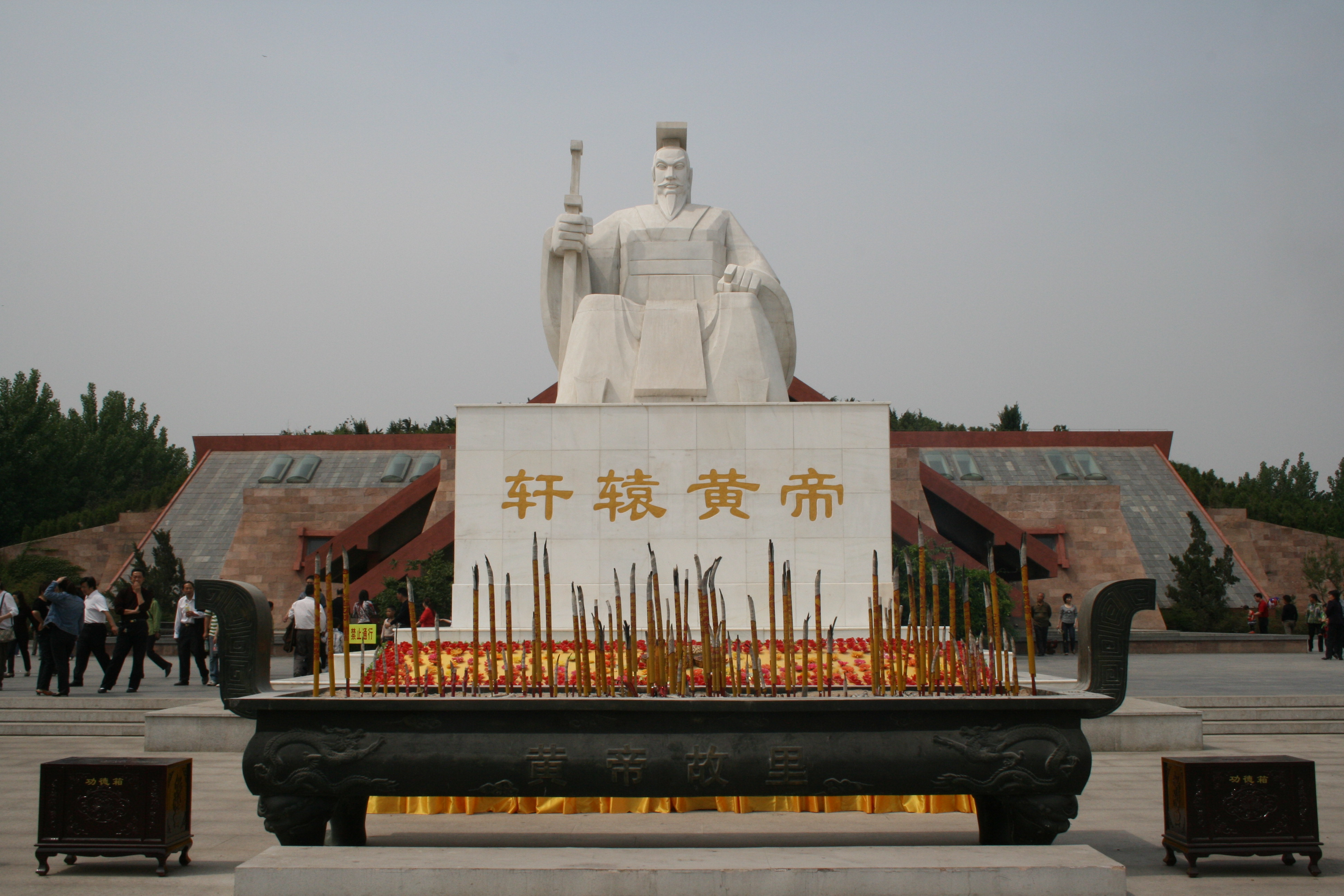
Huangdi Shrine, Xinzheng City, Henan Province

As the Yellow Deity with Four Faces (黃帝四面 Huángdì Sìmiàn) he represents the centre of the universe and vision of the unity which controls the four directions. It is explained in the Huangdi Sijing ("Four Scriptures of the Yellow Emperor") that regulating "heart within brings order outside". In order to reign, one must "reduce himself" abandoning emotions, "drying up like a corpse", never allowing oneself to be carried away, as the Yellow Emperor himself did during his three years of refuge on Mount Bowang in order to find himself according to the myth. This practice creates an internal void where all the vital forces of creation gather, and the more indeterminate they remain, the more powerful they will be.

It is from this centre that equilibrium and harmony emanate, equilibrium of the vital organs which becomes harmony between the person and the environment. As sovereign of the centre, the Yellow Emperor is the very image of the concentration or re-centering of the self. By self-control, taking charge of his own body one becomes powerful outside. The centre is also the vital point in the microcosm by means of which the internal universe viewed as an altar is created. The body is a universe, and by going into himself and by incorporating the fundamental structures of the universe, the sage will gain access to the gates of Heaven, the unique point where communication between Heaven, Earth and Man can occur. The centre is the convergence of within and outside, the contraction of chaos on the point which is equidistant from all directions. It is the place which is no place, where all creation is born and dies.

The Great Deity of the Central Peak (中岳大帝 Zhōngyuèdàdì) is another epithet representing Huangdi as the hub of creation, the axis mundi (which in Chinese mythology is Kunlun) that is the manifestation of the divine order in physical reality, that opens to immortality.

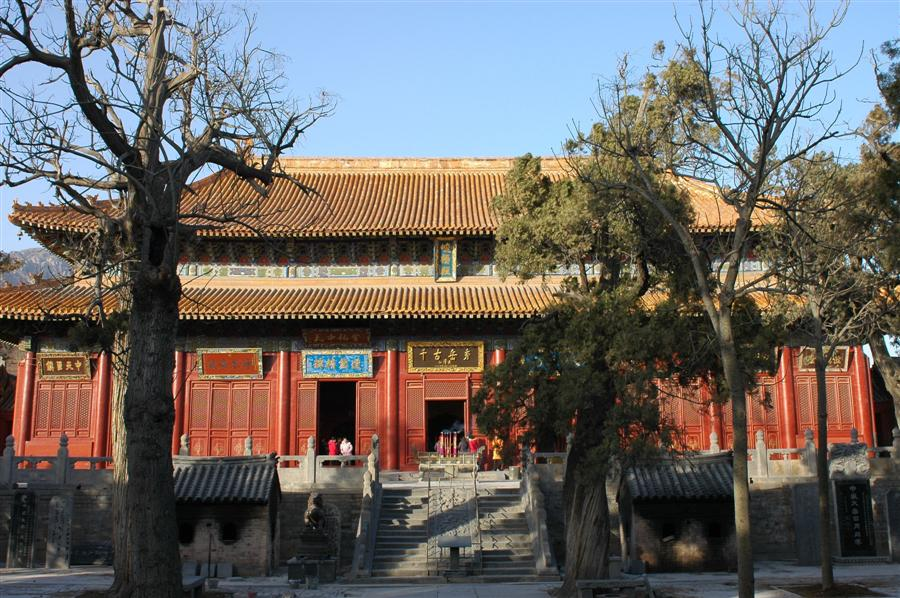
Temple of the Central Peak, Mount Song, in Henan.

=== As ancestor ===
Throughout history, several sovereigns and dynasties claimed (or were claimed) to descend from the Yellow Emperor. Sima Qian's Shiji presented Huangdi as ancestor of the two legendary rulers Yao and Shun, and traced various lines of descent from Huangdi to the founders of the Xia, Shang, and Zhou dynasties. He claimed that Liu Bang, the first emperor of the Han dynasty, was a descendant of Huangdi. He believed that the ruling house of the Qin dynasty was originated also from the Yellow Emperor.

Claiming descent from illustrious ancestors remained a common tool of political legitimacy in the following ages. Wang Mang (c. 45 BC – 23 AD), of the short-lived Xin dynasty, claimed to descend from the Yellow Emperor in order to justify his overthrow of the Han. As he announced in January of 9 AD: "I possess no virtue, [but] I rely upon the fact that] I am a descendant of my august original ancestor, the Yellow Emperor..." About two hundred years later a ritual specialist named Dong Ba 董巴, who worked for at the court of the Cao Wei, which had recently succeeded the Han, promoted the idea that the Cao family was descended from Huangdi via Emperor Zhuanxu.

During the Tang dynasty, non-Han rulers also claimed descent from the Yellow Emperor, for individual and national prestige, as well as to connect themselves to the Tang. Most Chinese noble families also claimed descent from Huangdi. This practice was well established in Tang and Song times, when hundreds of clans claimed such descent. The main support for this theory – as recorded in the Tongdian (801 AD) and the Tongzhi (mid 12th century) – was the Shiji's statement that Huangdi's 25 sons were given 12 different surnames, and that these surnames had diversified into all Chinese surnames. After Emperor Zhenzong (r. 997–1022) of the Song dynasty dreamed of a figure he was told was the Yellow Emperor, the Song imperial family started to claim Huangdi as its first ancestor.

A number of overseas Chinese clans that keep a genealogy also trace their family ultimately to Huangdi, explaining their different surnames as name changes claimed to have derived from the fourteen surnames of Huangdi's descendants. Many Chinese clans, both overseas and in China, claim Huangdi as their ancestor to reinforce their sense of being Chinese.

Gun, Yu, Zhuanxu, Zhong, Li, Shujun, and Yuqiang are various emperors, gods, and heroes whose ancestor was also supposed to be Huangdi. The Huantou, Miaomin, and Quanrong peoples were said to be descended from Huangdi.

== Traditional dates ==
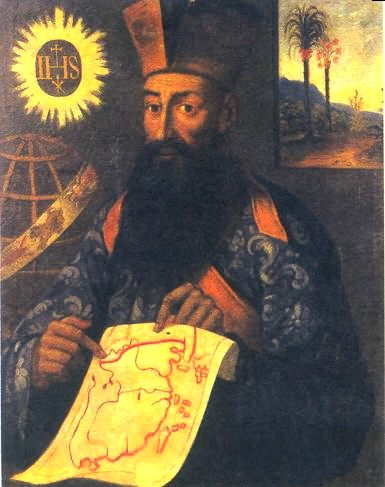
Martino Martini, a seventeenth-century Jesuit who, based on Chinese historical records, calculated that the Yellow Emperor's reign began in 2697 BC. Martini's dates are still used today.

Although the traditional Chinese calendar did not mark years continuously, some Han-dynasty astronomers tried to determine the years of the life and reign of the Yellow Emperor. In 78 BC, under the reign of Emperor Zhao of Han, an official called Zhang Shouwang (張壽望) calculated that 6,000 years had passed since the time of Huangdi; the court refused his proposal for reform, countering that only 3,629 years had elapsed. In the proleptic Julian calendar, the court's calculations would have placed the Yellow Emperor in the late 38th century BC rather than in the 27th century BC that is conventional nowadays.

During their Jesuit missions in China in the seventeenth century, the Jesuits tried to determine what year should be considered the epoch of the Chinese calendar. In his Sinicae historiae decas prima (first published in Munich in 1658), Martino Martini (1614–1661) dated the royal ascension of Huangdi to 2697 BC, but started the Chinese calendar with the reign of Fuxi, which he claimed started in 2952 BCE. Philippe Couplet's (1623–1693) "Chronological table of Chinese monarchs" (Tabula chronologica monarchiae sinicae; 1686) also gave the same date for the Yellow Emperor. The Jesuits' dates provoked great interest in Europe, where they were used for comparisons with Biblical chronology. Modern Chinese chronology has generally accepted Martini's dates, except that it usually places the reign of Huangdi in 2698 BC (see next paragraph) and omits Huangdi's predecessors Fuxi and Shennong, who are considered "too legendary to include."

Helmer Aslaksen, a mathematician who teaches at the National University of Singapore and specializes in the Chinese calendar, explains that those who use 2698 BC as a first year probably do so because they want to have "a year 0 as the starting point", or because "they assume that the Yellow Emperor started his year with the Winter solstice of 2698 BC", hence the difference with the year 2697 BC calculated by the Jesuits.

Starting in 1903, radical publications started using the projected date of birth of the Yellow Emperor as the first year of the Chinese calendar. Different newspapers and magazines proposed different dates. Jiangsu, for example counted 1905 as year 4396 (making 2491 BC the first year of the Chinese calendar), whereas the Minbao (the organ of the Tongmenghui) reckoned 1905 as 4603 (first year: 2698 BC). Liu Shipei (1884–1919) created the Yellow Emperor Calendar to show the unbroken continuity of the Han race and Han culture from earliest times. There is no evidence that this calendar was used before the 20th century. Liu's calendar started with the birth of the Yellow Emperor, which was reckoned to be 2711 BC. When Sun Yat-sen declared the foundation of the Republic of China on 2 January 1912, he decreed that this was the 12th day of the 11th month of year 4609 (epoch: 2698 BCE), but that the state would now be using the solar calendar and count 1912 as the first year of the Republic. Chronological tables published in the 1938 edition of the Cihai dictionary followed Sun Yat-sen in using 2698 BC as the year of Huangdi's accession; this chronology is now "widely reproduced, with little variation".

== See also ==
- Chinese folk religion
- Chinese theology
- Emperors Yan and Huang (monument)
- Jiutian Xuannü, goddess of war, sex, and longevity as well as teacher of the Yellow Emperor
- Simianshen
- Tianxia
- Xuanyuanism
- Jade Emperor

== Notes ==
Yellow Emperor Three Sovereigns and Five Emperors
Regnal titles
| Preceded by Shennong | Emperor of China | Succeeded by Shaohao |
