= Dui (vessel) =

Chinese ritual bronze vessel

- dui in bronze script
- Chinese: 敦
Transcriptions
Standard Mandarin
- Hanyu Pinyin: duī
- Wade–Giles: tui^{1}
- IPA: [twéɪ]
Middle Chinese
- Middle Chinese: twoj
Old Chinese
- Zhengzhang: *tˤur

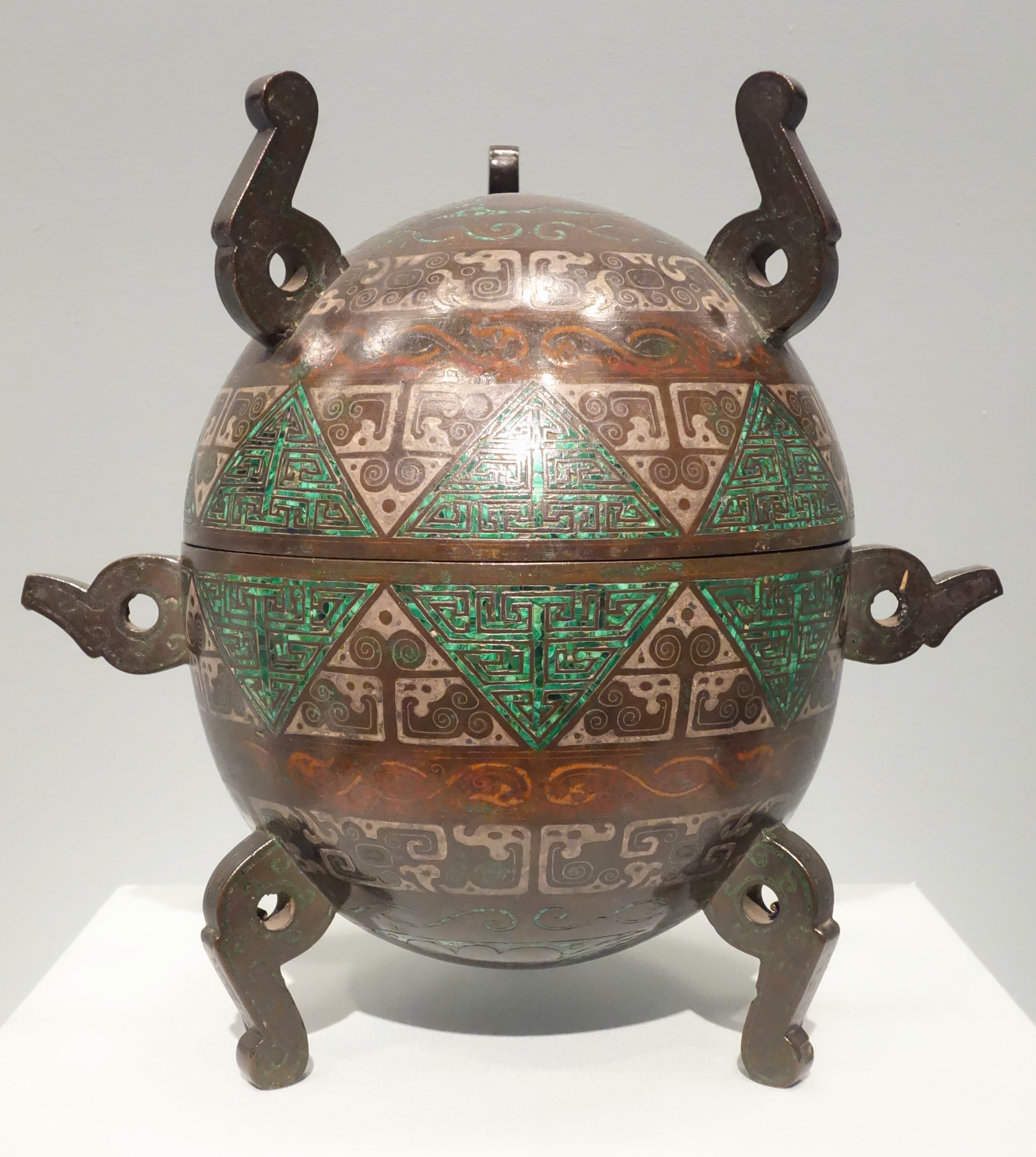
Lacquered bronze dui vessel with turquoise and silver inlays.

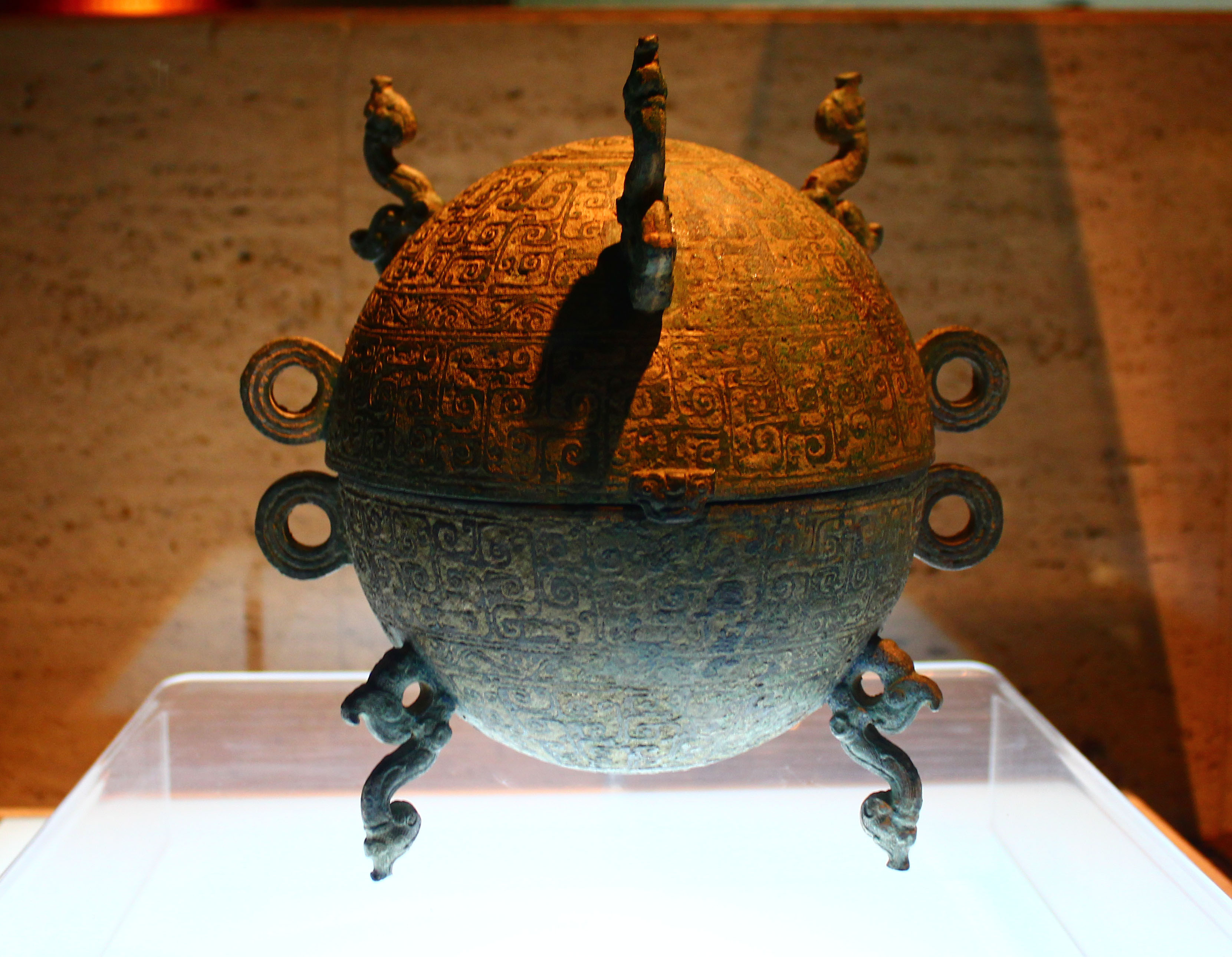
Bronze dui vessel with inlaid geometric cloud pattern, Hubei Provincial Museum.

A dui (Chinese: 敦; pinyin: duì) is a type of Chinese ritual bronze vessel used in the late Zhou dynasty and the Warring States period of ancient China. It was a food container used as a ritual vessel. Most dui consist of two bowls supported on three legs.

== Form ==
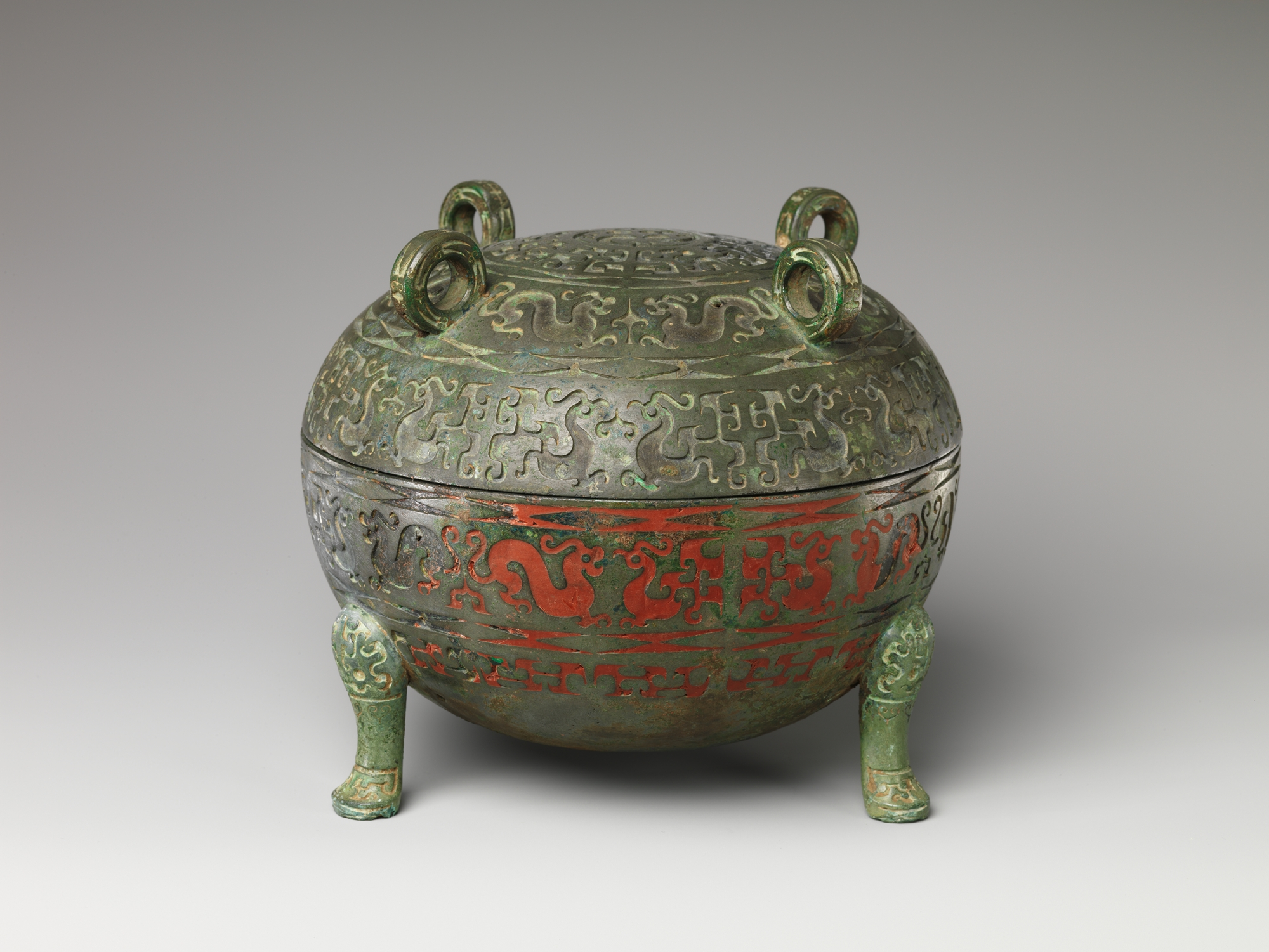
Zhou dynasty dui

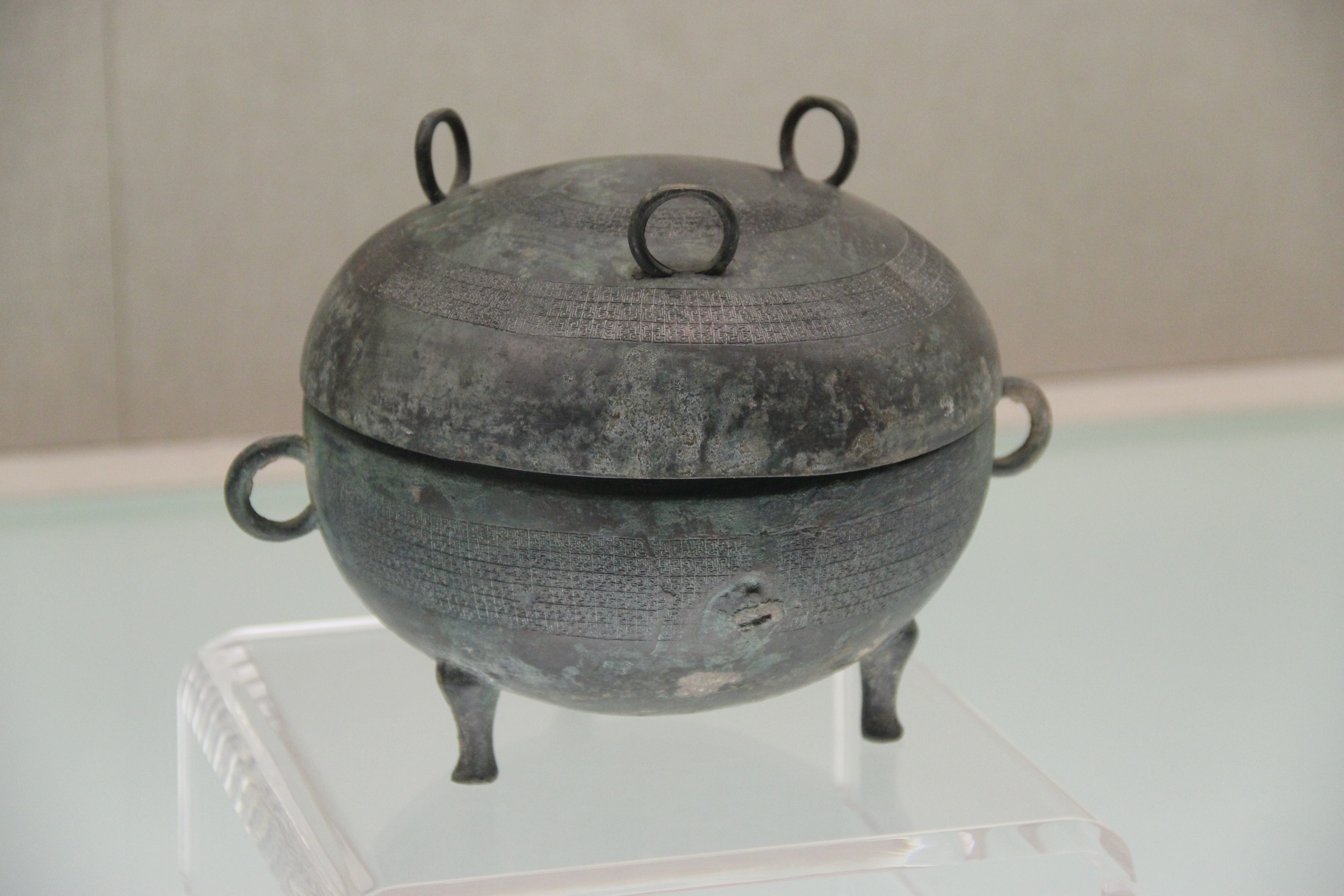
Spring & Autumn Period dui

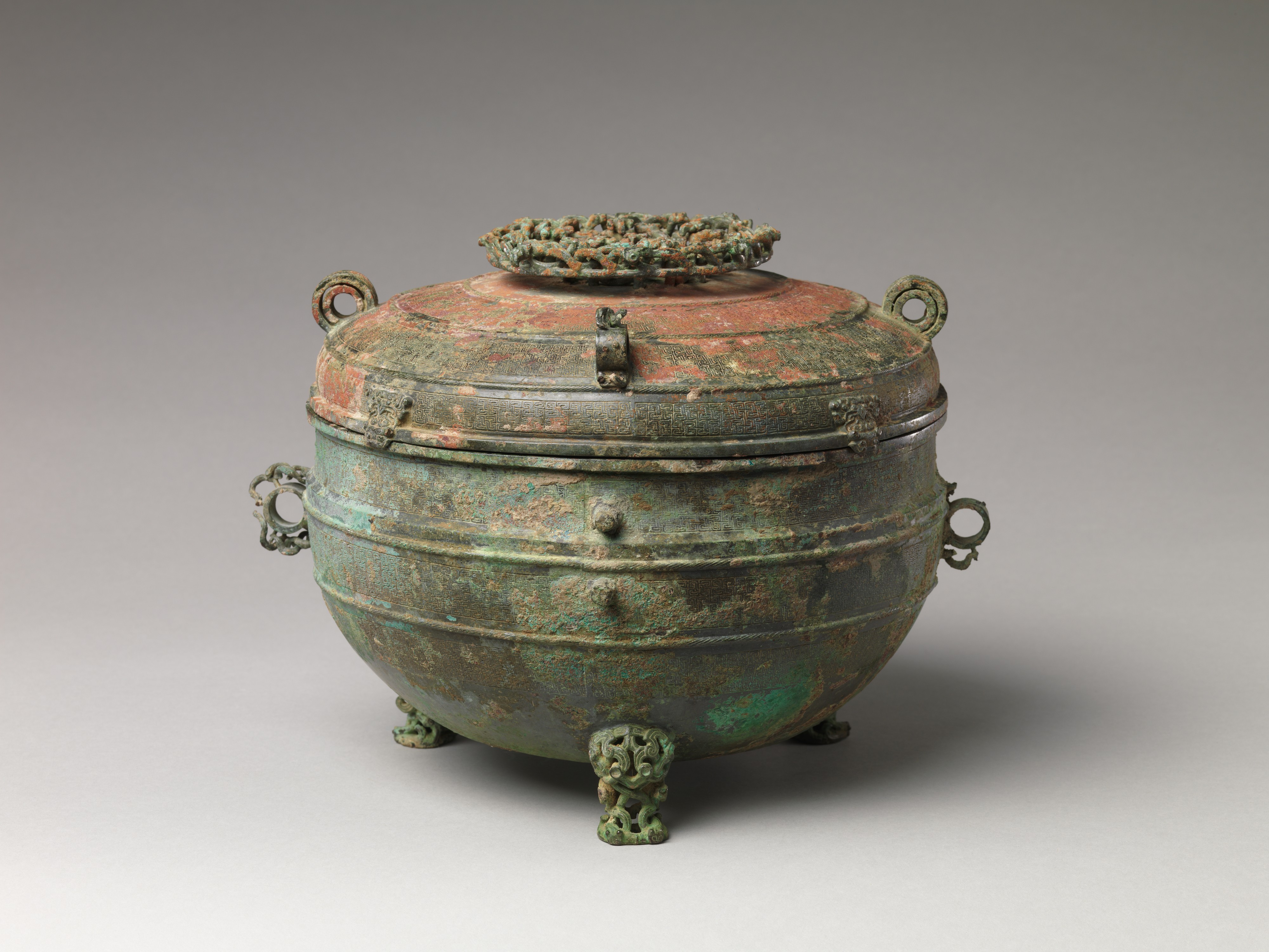
Spring & Autumn Period dui

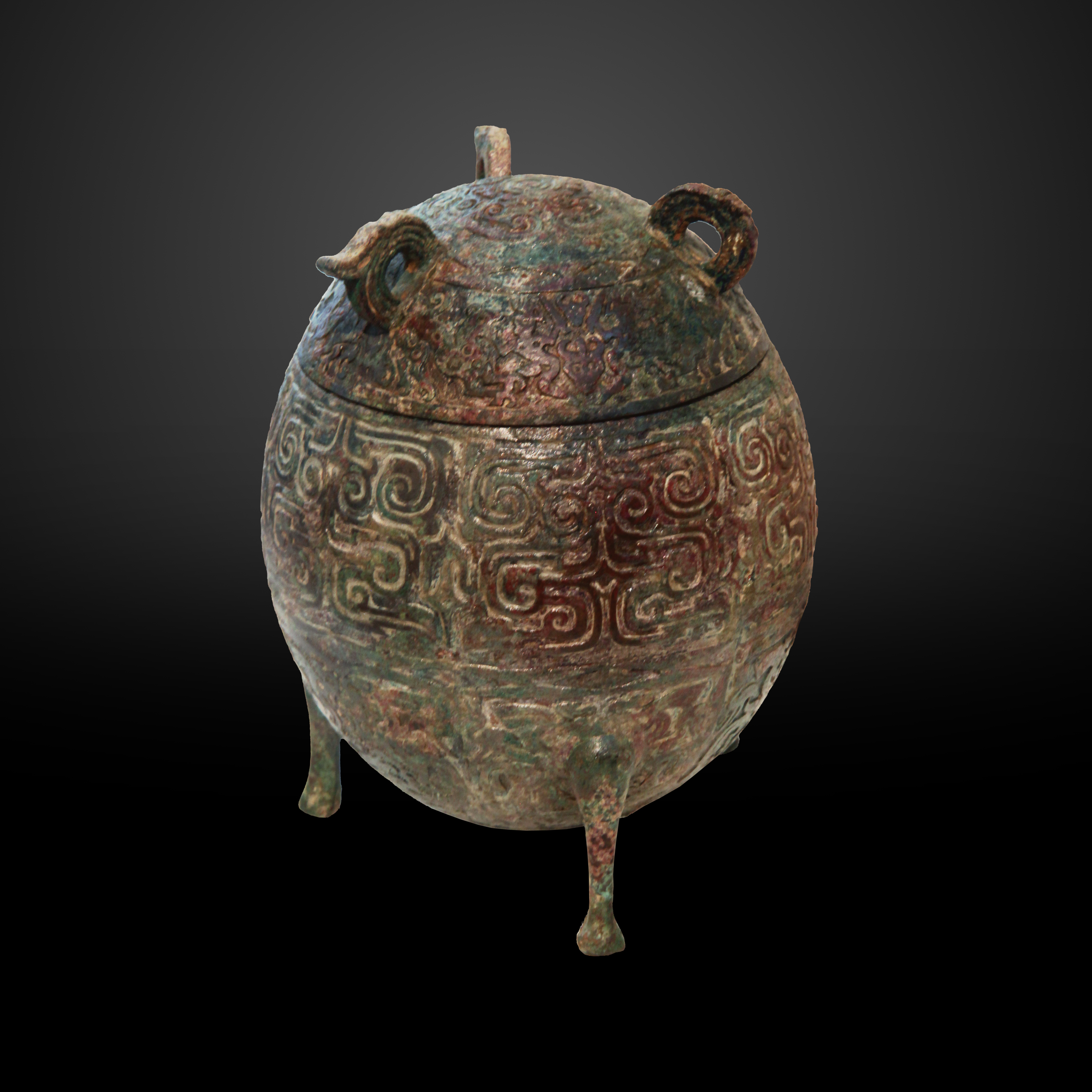
Ovular dui, Warring States Period

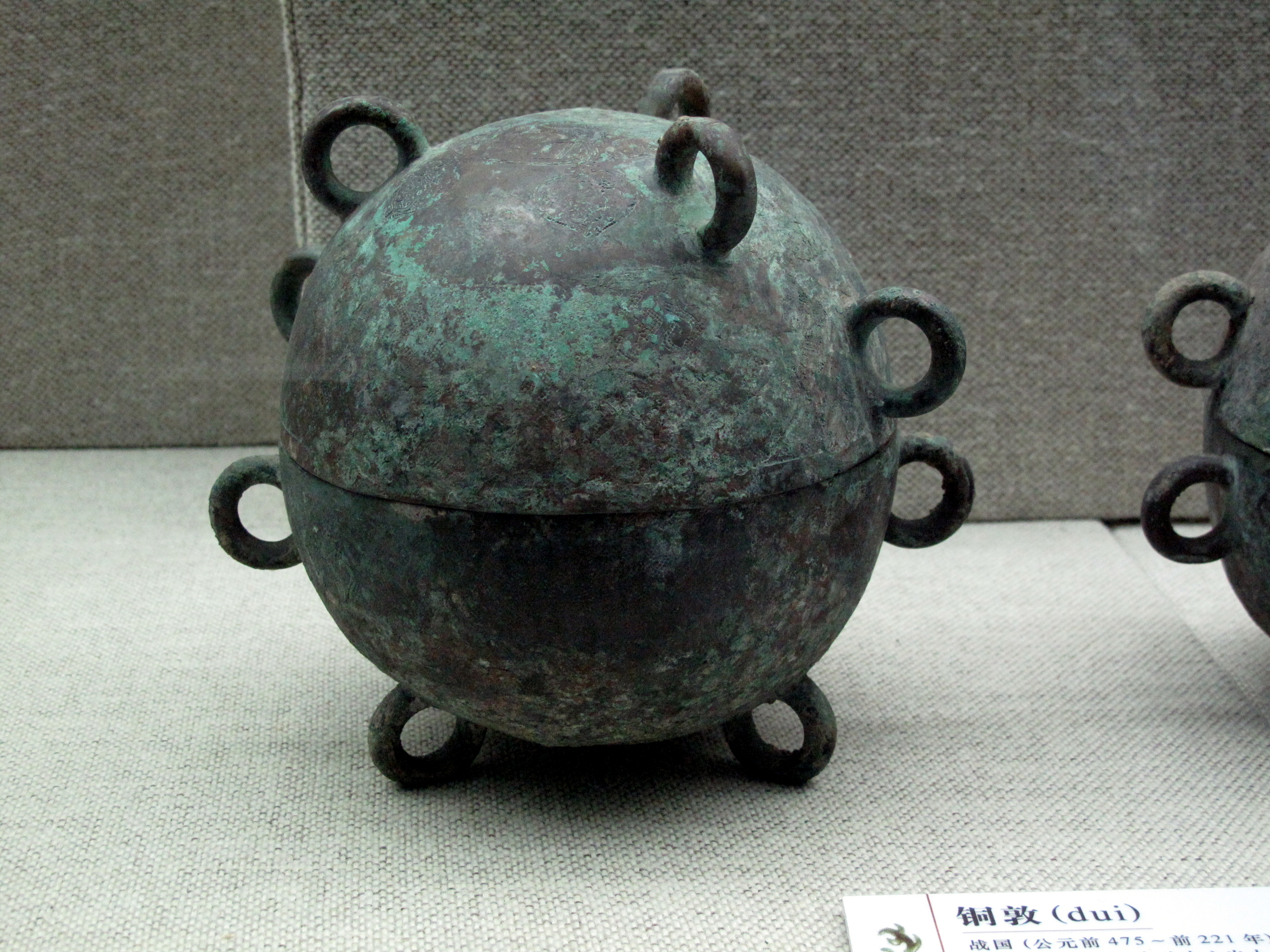
Warring-States-Period dui with an abundance of rings.

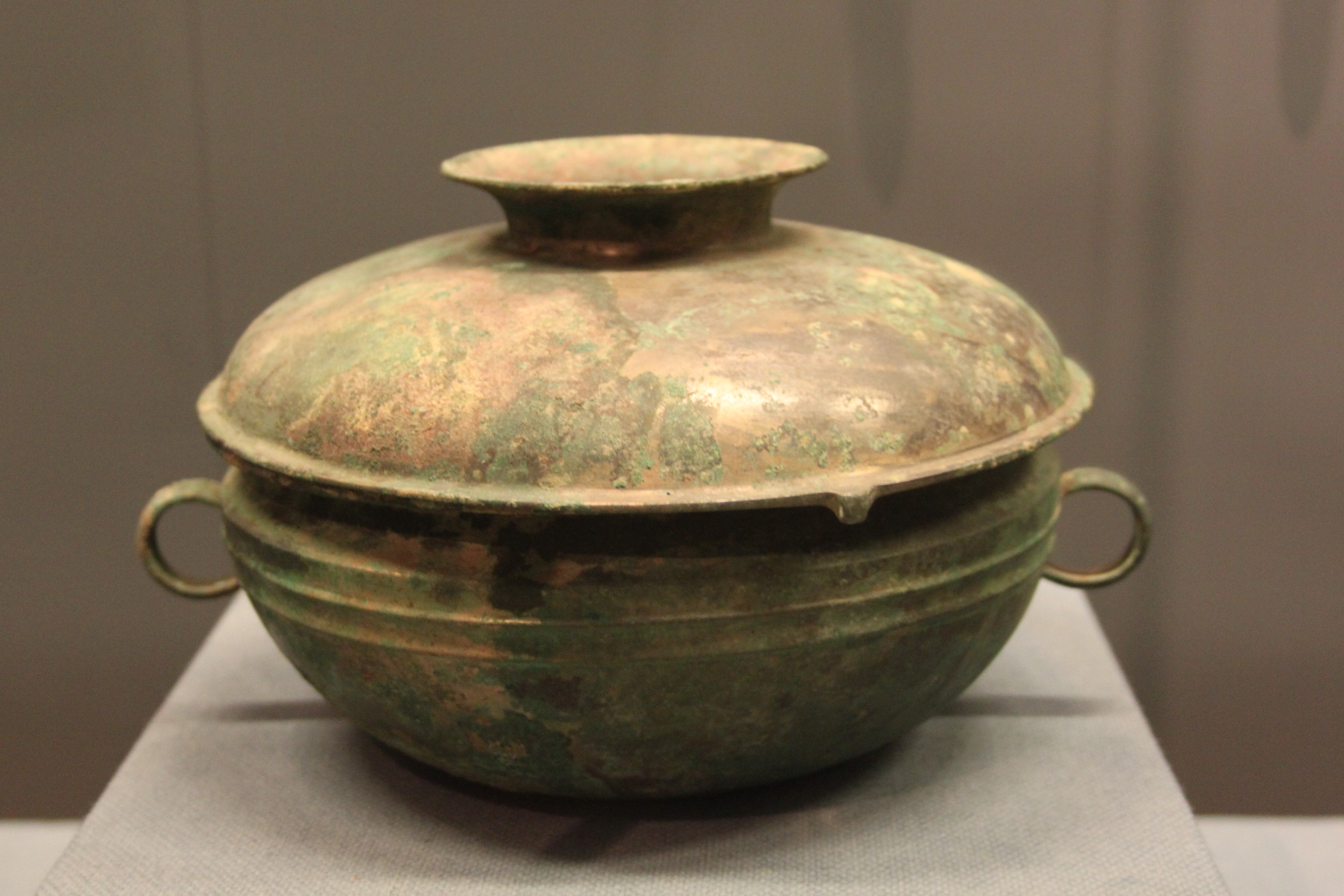
Warring-States-Period dui with pedestals

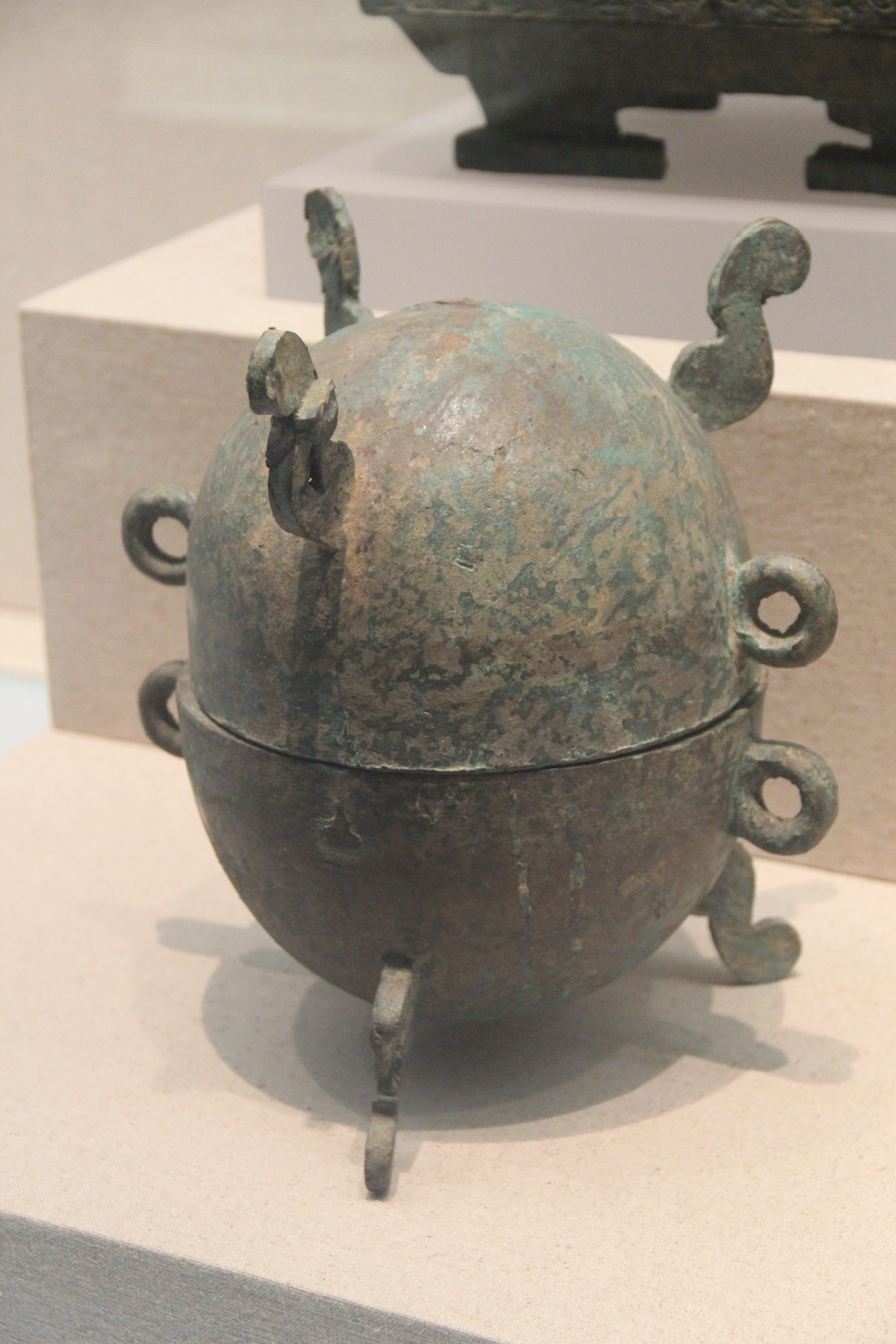
Warring-States-Period ovular dui

The dui is typically spherical in shape, possessing a half-domed bowl on bottom with a similarly shaped container fitting on top. Shapes vary from circular, ovular, or subcircular. Types from the late Eastern Zhou appear more spheroidal; containers become more ovular during the Spring and Autumn period; and transitioning from the late Spring and Autumn to the Warring States period, vessel types appear less round in shape, possessing a flattened lid paired with a rounded bowl. The vessel stands on either a single pedestal or is supported by three legs (similarly to the ding). The three legs would permit heating of the food within. Each vessel sports two handles; either set or unfixed rings adorn the bottom portion of the vessel, allowing for easy transport.

== Decor ==
The containers themselves possess highly intricate detailing, varying in geometric and curvilinear designs distributed in symmetrical registers. Many of these carvings assume biomorphic forms, depicting typical animal imagery found throughout ancient China such as cats, snakes, dragons or birds. Many of the designs are inlaid with metal, though few complete renditions still exist.

=== Examples ===
From the specimen found from the Warring States period, proof of copper in-lay can be found in swirling spherical patterns that accentuate the shape of the dui. Incised geometric patterning along with cat-like outlines emanate from the container.

Types coming out of the Late Eastern Zhou are spherical in form and possess three animal masks in relief; the heads are situated symmetrically around the lid, mirroring the three ding-like feet supporting the base. Simple linear patterning covers the vessel in clearly defined registers, while high-relief rope bands separate the basin from the lid.

From the Warring States period, ovular forms become subcircular shapes. Four fantastical creatures adorn the lid of this period's example, forming upright rings. Animal pendant masks hold moveable rings in their mouths, allowing for easy transport. In-lay patterning surfaces in this example too, with turquoise and silver in typical registers. Curvilinear patterns accentuate the shape; the more prominent bands of decoration portray symmetrical bird figures with intertwining bodies encircling the vessel. Border designs consist of S-shaped bands around the foot, lid, and body.

== Function and Usage ==
In some examples the two symmetric hemispheres could be used individually or as a bowl with lid when facilitating the ritual process. Lidded varieties are evidenced by the lack of supporting structure on each bowl. The vessel might be displayed prominently within a temple or hall but also found use during feasts commemorating ancestors. At times, the vessel was produced solely for burial. In later periods the vessel became a symbol of societal prominence and the religious aspect receded.

== Historical Development ==
The dui functioned and was created in the Late Zhou dynasties and Warring States period in early China. The dui is one of the earliest types of near-spherical shape of vessel. In the middle of the Spring and Autumn period, people gradually began to use the dui as a warming and serving food vessel. According to scholar K.C. Chang, the term "dui" was said to have been written in the catalogue incorrectly by cataloguers from the Song dynasty. First seen in Eastern Zhou, "dui" means "gobular vessel", but in Shang and Western Zhou, this particular vessel was called "gui". "Dui" was transcribed into the modern equivalent of "gui".

Some dui vessels were inspired by nomadic Steppe art with sophisticated designs and colorful exteriors. After the Eastern Zhou dynasty, the dui might have been seen as a status symbol or used in various rituals. It was most popular during the Late Zhou Dynasty, but later it was replaced by another food container named "sheng" that was used during the Qin and Han dynasties. In the Warring States Period, the form was changed to an oval and the lid was transformed to reflect the body in a mirror image. They are sometimes marked as "watermelon ding" which were dated back to the early Warring States Period.

== Important specimens ==
The Chen Hou Yinqi dui (陳侯因齊敦), cast by King Wei of Qi (r. 356–320 BCE), bears an inscription containing the earliest attestation of the Yellow Emperor in the historical record.

In 2004, a dui vessel was discovered in tomb M6 in Zhenghan Road, Xinzheng City by the Xinzheng Work Station of the Henan Provincial Cultural Relics and Archaeology Institute.

== Works cited ==
- Chang, K.C. (October 1981). "Archaeology and Chinese Historiography". World Archaeology. 13 (2): 156–169. doi:10.1080/00438243.1981.9979823.
- China Heritage Project (September 2005). "Heritage and Archaeological News Briefs: New bronze discoveries". China Heritage Newsletter (3). The Australian National University. ISSN 1833-8461.
- "Food serving vessel (dui)". New York: The Metropolitan Museum of Art.
- Lawton, Thomas (1983). Chinese Art of the Warring States Period: Change and Continuity. Washington, D.C.: Smithsonian Institution. pp. 32–42.
- Lefebvre d'Argence, Rene-Yvon (1977). Bronze Vessels in the Avery Brundage Collection. San Francisco, CA: Asian Art Museum. pp. 122–123.
- Li Xueqin (1980). The Wonder of Chinese Bronzes. Beijing: Foreign Languages Press. pp. 12–13.
- Loehr, Max (1968). Ritual Vessels of Bronze Age China. Harvard University: The Asia Society, Inc. pp. 150–153 – via New York Graphic Society.
- Su Xiaowei (蘇曉威) (2017). "Researching the image of the Yellow Emperor in China's textual sources and archaeological materials". Journal of Chinese Humanities. 3. Translated by Weber, Catarina. Lieden: Brill: 48–71. doi:10.1163/23521341-12340043.
