= Empress Feng =

Empress Feng may refer to several empresses in Chinese history:

- Empress Dowager Feng (442–490), empress dowager and de facto ruler of Northern Wei, wife of Emperor Wencheng
- Empress Feng Qing, empress of Northern Wei, first empress of Emperor Xiaowen
- Empress Feng Run (died 499), empress of Northern Wei, second empress of Emperor Xiaowen
- Empress Feng (Later Jin), empress of Later Jin
