= Chinese Taipei =

Name used by Taiwan in international organizations and events

- Traditional Chinese: 中華臺北
- Simplified Chinese: 中华台北
- Postal: Chunghwa Taipei
Transcriptions
Standard Mandarin
- Hanyu Pinyin: Zhōnghuá Táiběi
- Bopomofo: ㄓㄨㄥ ㄏㄨㄚˊㄊㄞˊㄅㄟˇ
- Gwoyeu Romatzyh: Jonghua Tairbeei
- Wade–Giles: Chung^{1}-hua^{2} T'ai^{2}-pei^{3}
- Tongyong Pinyin: Jhong-huá Táiběi
- MPS2: Jūnghuá Táiběi
- IPA: [ʈʂʊ́ŋ.xwǎ tʰǎɪ.pèɪ]
Hakka
- Romanization: Chûng-fà Thòi-pet
Southern Min
- Hokkien POJ: Tiong-hôa Tâi-pak
- Tâi-lô: Tiong-huâ Tâi-pak
Eastern Min
- Fuzhou BUC: Dṳ̆ng-huà Dài-báe̤k

"Chinese Taipei" is the name used in various international organizations and tournaments for groups or delegations representing the Republic of China (ROC), a country commonly known as Taiwan.

Due to the one China principle stipulated by the People's Republic of China (PRC, China), Taiwan, being a non-UN member after its expulsion in 1971 with ongoing dispute of its sovereignty, was prohibited from using or displaying any of its national symbols that would represent the statehood of Taiwan, such as its national name, anthem and flag, at international events. The term "Chinese Taipei" was first proposed in 1979 and was eventually approved in the Nagoya Resolution, whereby both the ROC/Taiwan and the PRC/China obtained their right of participation and would remain as separate delegations in any activities of the International Olympic Committee (IOC) and its associated organizations. This term came into official use in 1981 following a name change of the Republic of China Olympic Committee (ROCOC) to the Chinese Taipei Olympic Committee. This arrangement later became a model for the ROC/Taiwan to continue participating in various international organizations and diplomatic affairs other than the Olympic Games, including the World Trade Organization, the World Health Organization, the Metre Convention, APEC, and international pageants.

"Chinese Taipei" is a deliberately ambiguous term, designed to be equivocal about the political status of the ROC/Taiwan. The meaning of "Chinese" (Zhōnghuá, Chinese: 中華) is also ambiguous, so that either party is able to interpret it as national identity or cultural sphere (similar to ethnonyms as Anglo, Arab, Hispanic or Iranian). The specific mention of "Taipei" signifies its capital city without explicitly defining the certain territorial boundary of the ROC. Since the IOC has ruled out the use of the name "Republic of China", the neologism was considered as an expedient resolution and a more inclusive term than just "Taiwan" to both the Kuomintang, the ruling party of the ROC at the time during the Nagoya Resolution, and the PRC. The PRC's persistent policy is to keep Taipei isolated on the world stage and disagrees with any use of "Taiwan" as an official title, in order to prevent Taiwan from gaining international recognition for "independent statehood" separate from the PRC. The term "Taiwan, China" or "Taipei, China" was rejected by the ROC government because it could be construed as Taiwan being a subordinate region to the PRC.

Popular opinion in Taiwan has changed drastically in regard to the cross-strait relations and the nationalistic discourses since the democratization of Taiwan and the end of one-party rule by the Kuomintang. "Chinese Taipei" has since been viewed by many Taiwanese as an anachronistic, aggravating, and humiliating term. The Taiwan Name Rectification Campaign sought to alter the formal name from "Chinese Taipei" to "Taiwan" for representation in Olympic Games and further potential international events. A nationwide referendum was held in 2018, in which a proposal for the name change was rejected. The main argument against such a move was the uncertain consequences of such a renaming; at worst, the renaming dispute could be used by China as an excuse to pressure the IOC to exclude Taiwan from participating in the Olympic Games completely and force its existing membership to be revoked. This was the case when Taiwan was stripped of the right to host the 2019 East Asian Youth Games amid its renaming issue with China during that year.

== Origins ==
=== Two Chinas at the Olympics ===
In the aftermath of the Chinese Civil War in 1949, the People's Republic of China (PRC) was established and the nationalist Republic of China (ROC) government retreated to Taiwan, previously a Qing territory that was ceded to Japanese rule from 1895 until its surrender at the end of World War II in 1945. As time went on, the increased official recognition of the PRC in international activities, such as when accorded recognition in 1971 by the United Nations, instead of that accorded previously to the ROC saw existing diplomatic relations transfer from Taipei to Beijing. The ROC needed to come to a beneficial conclusion to how it would be referred when there was participation by the PRC in the same forum.

The International Olympic Committee (IOC) recognized both the PRC and the ROC Olympic Committees in 1954. In 1958, the PRC withdrew its membership from the IOC and other international sports organizations in protest over the continued recognition of the ROC.

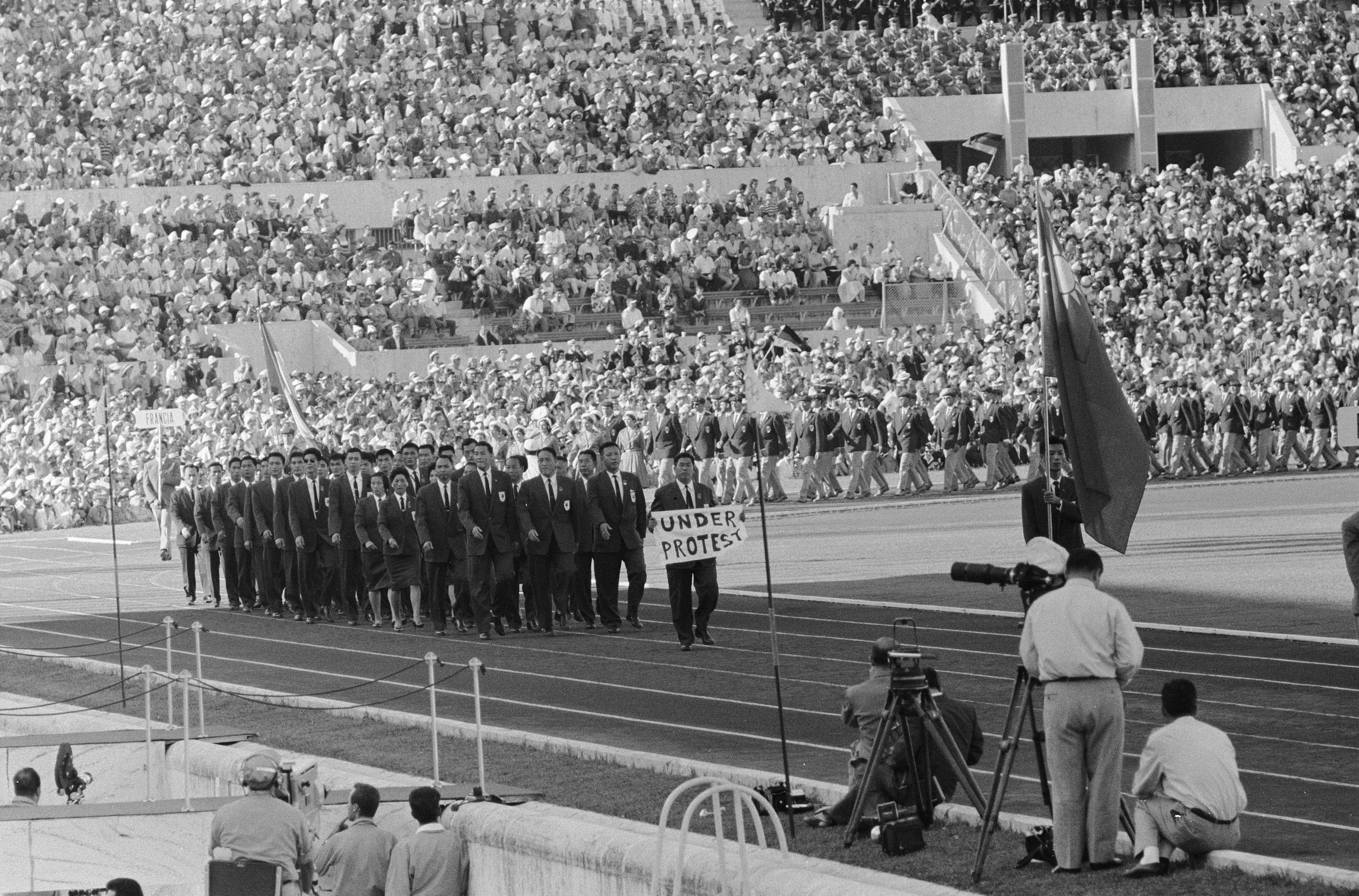
The ROC team marched behind an "Under Protest" banner against the name "Formosa" at the 1960 Summer Olympics opening ceremony

Following the PRC's withdrawal in 1958, the IOC continued to grapple with the question of China's representation. In 1959, Soviet Union members of the IOC requested that the ROC's National Olympic Committee change its name because "this NOC cannot possibly supervise sports in mainland China." The IOC ruled that the committee based in Taipei could no longer be recognized under the name "Chinese National Olympic Committee" and stated that any application for recognition under a different name would be considered. The ROC delegation competed under different designations in subsequent Games, using "Formosa" at the 1960 Summer Olympics and "Taiwan" at the 1964 and 1968 Summer Olympics. The IOC subsequently permitted the ROC to compete under the name Republic of China in 1972.

In 1975, the PRC applied to rejoin the IOC as the sole sports organization representing the whole China. The following year, the government of the host country, Canada, refused to allow the ROC team to compete under the name "Republic of China" or to use "China" in its name at the 1976 Summer Olympics. The IOC then voted to change the name of the ROC team to "Taiwan", which was rejected by the ROC, and the ROC announced their withdrawal from the 1976 Summer Olympics a day before the opening ceremony.

The top ROC leadership at the time asserted Chinese nationalism, contending both parts of divided China are Chinese territories and Taiwan did not represent all the regions of the ROC. What people refer to as Taiwan is one of several areas or islands (Penghu, Kinmen and Matsu in addition to Taiwan) and Taiwan alone did not reflect the "territorial extent" of the ROC. Furthermore, although it is true that most products from the area controlled by the ROC are labeled "made in Taiwan", the trade practices of the ROC are such that the regional area of production is used for labeling. Some wines from Kinmen are labeled "made in Kinmen", just as some perfume are labeled "made in Paris" and not "made in France". Therefore, the ROC government refused to accept the name of Taiwan during the period.

=== 1979 IOC resolutions ===
Following the 1976 Montreal Olympics, IOC President Lord Killanin established a commission to examine the issue of "Two Chinas." Killanin aimed to reintegrate the PRC into the Olympic Movement, and the matter was designated as a principal topic of discussion at the 81st IOC Session, held in Montevideo in April 1979. At that session, the IOC officially recognized the Olympic Committee of the PRC while continuing to acknowledge the Olympic Committee based in Taipei. The resolution left problems relating to the names, anthems and flags of both committees unsolved. The PRC showed a willingness to allow Taiwan to be included in the IOC but objected to the resolution, reaffirming sports organizations in Taiwan must not use any of the emblems of the Republic of China. He Zhenliang, a representative of the PRC, stated in Montevideo:

According to the Olympic Charter, only one Chinese Olympic Committee should be recognized. In consideration of the athletes in Taiwan having an opportunity to compete in the Olympic Games, the sports constitution in Taiwan could function as a local organization of China and still remain in the Olympic Movement in the name of the Chinese Taipei Olympic Committee. However, its anthem, flag and constitutions should be changed correspondingly.

After the 81st Session, the IOC Executive Board designated the Olympic Committee in Beijing as the Chinese Olympic Committee, with the PRC's anthem, flag and emblem. The Olympic Committee in Taipei was designated as the Chinese Taipei Olympic Committee, with a different anthem, flag and emblem from those the ROC used and which must be approved by the executive board. Lord Killanin submitted the resolution to IOC members for a postal vote following the conclusion of the IOC Executive Board meeting held in October 1979 in Nagoya. The resolution, known as the Nagoya Resolution, was approved in November 1979 by the IOC members, and later other international sports federations adopted the resolution. From 1949 until 1979, the ROC had represented "China" in most of the world's sports federations.

The Nagoya Resolution was welcomed by the PRC as the resolution followed the PRC's One China principle, whereas the ROC decided that the ROC Olympic Committee must strongly protest against the decisions. From November 1979, the ROC Olympic Committee and Taiwan's IOC member, Henry Hsu, filed a series of lawsuits in Lausanne against the IOC for annulment of the Nagoya Resolution. Taiwanese officials also boycotted the 1980 Winter and Summer Games in protest of not being allowed to use the ROC's official name, flag and national anthem.

=== 1981 agreement ===
In 1980, the IOC amended the Olympic Charter so that all National Olympic Committees (NOCs) when participating in the Games could use delegation flags and anthems, instead of national ones. Juan Antonio Samaranch, the new president of the IOC, met Henry Hsu several times to discuss the ROC Olympic Committee's status in the IOC. In order for the youth to participate in the Olympic Games and counteract the PRC's strategy of isolating the ROC, the ROC government concluded that the ROC Olympic Committee should not withdraw from the IOC.

The Chinese Taipei Olympic flag has been in use since 1981

National Flag Anthem of the Republic of China

In 1981, the ROC government formally accepted the name "Chinese Taipei". A flag bearing the emblem of its Olympic Committee against a white background as the Chinese Taipei Olympic flag was confirmed in January. Based on the Olympic Charter amended at the 82nd IOC Session, an agreement was signed on 23 March in Lausanne by Juan Antonio Samaranch, the president of the IOC, and Shen Chia-ming, the president of the Chinese Taipei Olympic Committee (CTOC). The 1981 agreement, also known as the Lausanne Agreement, specified the name, flag and emblem of the CTOC. The CTOC is therefore entitled to be treated on the equal footing as other NOCs. In 1983, the National Flag Anthem of the Republic of China was chosen as the anthem of the Chinese Taipei delegation, and Chinese Taipei has been listed under the "T" group in IOC protocol order. Taiwan has competed under this name and flag exclusively at each Games since the 1984 Winter Olympics, as well as at the Paralympics and at other international events (with flags on which the Olympic rings are replaced by a symbol appropriate to the event).

== Translation compromise ==
=== Chinese ===
Both the Republic of China (ROC) and the People's Republic of China (PRC) agree to use the English name "Chinese Taipei". The English word "Chinese" is ambiguous, and may refer to either the state or the culture. The ROC translates "Chinese Taipei" as Zhōnghuá Táiběi (simplified Chinese: 中华台北; traditional Chinese: 中華臺北). The term Zhōnghuá is also used in the ROC's official name and state-owned enterprises. Meanwhile, the PRC translates the name as Zhōngguó Táiběi (中国台北; 中國臺北) or literally "Taipei, China", in the same manner as Zhōngguó Xiānggǎng (中国香港; 中國香港, lit. 'Hong Kong, China'), explicitly connoting that Taipei is a part of the Chinese state. The disagreement was left unresolved, with both governments using their own translation domestically, until just before the 1990 Asian Games where Taiwan would officially participate under the Chinese Taipei name in a Chinese-language region for the first time, forcing the need for an agreement.

In 1989, the two Olympic committees signed a pact in Hong Kong where the PRC agreed to use the ROC's translation in international sports-related occasions hosted in China. Domestically, the PRC continues to use its own "Taipei, China" translation. During the 2008 Summer Olympics, Chinese state media used the agreed-upon Zhōnghuá Táiběi both internationally and in domestic press. However, during the 2020 Summer Olympics, state media began using Zhōngguó Táiběi domestically 93% of the time. During the 2022 Winter Olympics opening ceremony, China's state media's broadcast cut away to a clip of General Secretary of the Chinese Communist Party Xi Jinping when Taiwan's delegation paraded as Zhōnghuá Táiběi. The broadcast in the stadium introduced the team as Zhōnghuá Táiběi, while the television broadcast commentator of China Central Television announced the delegation's name as Zhōngguó Táiběi.

The World Health Organization, the international organization to both have Chinese as one of its official languages and have the ROC officially participate, uses Zhōnghuá Táiběi in meeting minutes when the ROC is officially invited, but uses Zhōngguó Táiběi in all other contexts.

=== Other languages ===
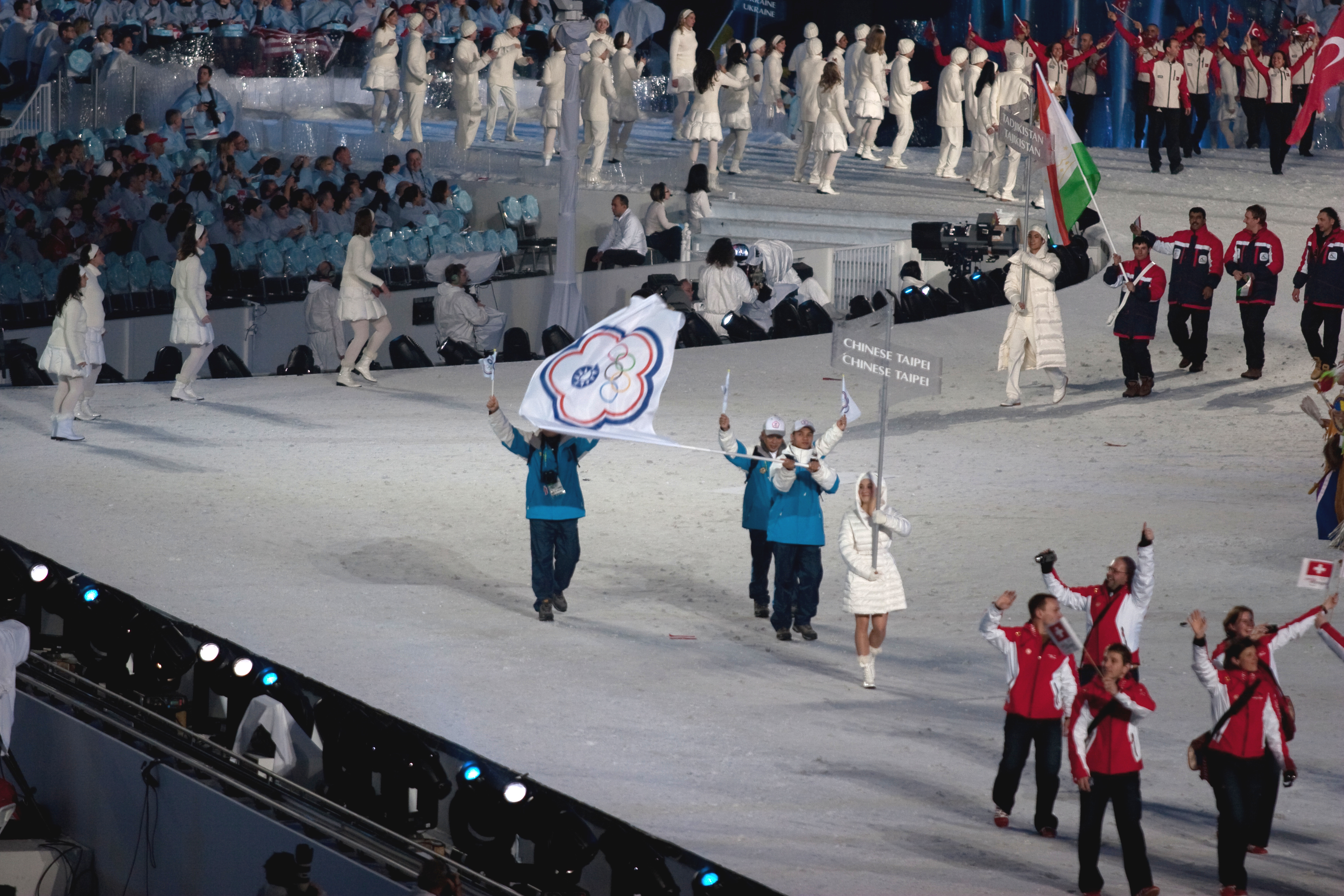
Taiwanese team at the 2010 Winter Olympics opening ceremony under the name of Chinese Taipei in both French and English

In French, multiple different names have been officially used. The World Trade Organization officially translates the name as Taipei Chinois, which has an ambiguous meaning. The text of the IOC's Nagoya Resolution in 1979 used the name Taipei de Chine suggesting the state meaning of "Chinese". Before signing the agreement between the IOC and the Chinese Taipei Olympic Committee in 1981, representatives of two committees decided that the French name need not be stated. Only the English name would be used in the future IOC official documents. To this day, Chinese Taipei's page on the French-language IOC's website internally uses both Taipei de Chine and Taipei chinois (with a lowercase "c"; capitalization is not used by default for geographic origin adjectives in French) for some image alt text, but the title of the page itself simply uses the English name "Chinese Taipei". When the name is announced during the Parade of Nations, the French and English announcers both repeat the identical name "Chinese Taipei" in English.

The IOC's practice of leaving "Chinese Taipei" untranslated in French was subsequently adopted in other languages. For instance, during the Parade of Nations at the 1992 Summer Olympics in Barcelona, "Chinese Taipei" was not translated into Spanish or Catalan. While the name was translated into Italian as Taipei Cinese at the 2006 Winter Olympics opening ceremony in Turin, this approach changed twenty years later. At the 2026 Winter Olympics in Milan, the delegation's name was no longer translated into Italian, appearing instead only in its English form.

In East Asian languages that would normally transcribe directly from Chinese, an English transliteration is used instead to sidestep the issue. Thus Japan uses Chainīzu Taipei (チャイニーズ・タイペイ) while South Korea uses Chainiseu Taibei (차이니스 타이베이) for their respective-language announcements during the Olympic Games or Asian Games. Meanwhile, Vietnam mostly follows ROC's translation and adapts the Sino-Vietnamese transcription to call Chinese Taipei as Đài Bắc Trung Hoa (alternatively Đài Bắc, Trung Hoa with a comma or Đài Bắc (Trung Hoa) with the brackets used; chữ Hán: 臺北中華, lit. 'Taipei, Zhonghua') likely due to the cosmetic and grammatical inconvenience when using direct English transliteration or the original English designation in Vietnamese context.

== Use of the name ==
=== International organizations and forums ===
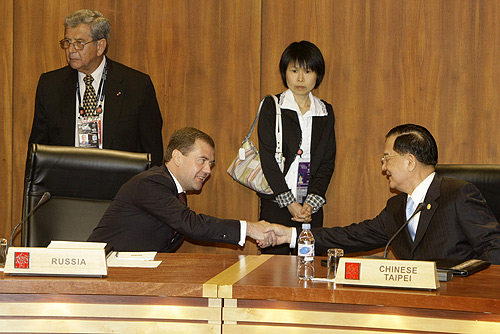
ROC participating as Chinese Taipei in 2008 APEC Summit in Peru

Besides the International Olympic Committee and sports organizations, Taiwan is a member economy of APEC and its official name in the organization is "Chinese Taipei". Taiwan's name in the World Trade Organization, "Separate Customs Territory of Taiwan, Penghu, Kinmen and Matsu", is frequently abbreviated as Chinese Taipei. It also participated as an invited guest in the World Health Organization (WHO) under the name of Chinese Taipei. The WHO is the only agency of the United Nations that the ROC is able, provided it is invited each year, to participate in since 1971.

The terminology has spilled into apolitical arenas. The PRC has successfully pressured some international organizations and NGOs to refer to the ROC as Chinese Taipei. The International Society for Horticultural Science replaced "Taiwan" with "Chinese Taipei" in designation used for the membership. In a similar case, two Taiwanese medical groups were forced to change the word "Taiwan" in their membership names of ISRRT due to a request by the WHO.

In the Miss World 1998, the government of the PRC pressured the Miss World Organization to rename Miss Republic of China 1998 to "Miss Chinese Taipei". The same happened in 2000, but with the Miss Universe Organization. Three years later at the Miss Universe pageant in Panama, the first official Miss China and Miss Taiwan competed alongside each other for the first time in history, prompting the PRC government to again demand that Miss Taiwan assume the title "Miss Chinese Taipei". Today, neither Miss Universe nor Miss World, the two largest pageant contests in the world, allow Taiwan's entrants to compete under the Taiwan label. In 2005, the third-largest pageant contest, Miss Earth, initially allowed Taiwanese contestant to compete as "Miss Taiwan"; a week into the pageant, however, the contestant's sash was updated to "Taiwan ROC". In 2008, Miss Earth changed the country's label to Chinese Taipei.

=== In Taiwan ===
The name is controversial in modern Taiwan; many Taiwanese see it as a result of shameful but necessary compromise, and a symbol of oppression that mainland China forced upon them. The title "Chinese Taipei" has been described as confusing, as it leads some people to believe that "Taipei" is a country or that it is located in or governed by mainland China. Taiwanese Olympian Chi Cheng has described competing under the name as "aggravating, humiliating and depressing."

Changing demographics and opinions in the country meant that more than 80% of citizens in 2016 saw themselves as Taiwanese, not Chinese, whereas in 1991, this figure was only 13.6%. This radical upswell in Taiwanese national identity has seen a re-appraisal and removal of "sinocentric" labels and figures established by the government during the period of Martial Law. For sporting events, the ROC team is abbreviated in Taiwan as the Team Zhonghua (中華隊). Starting around the time of the 2004 Summer Olympics, there has been a movement in Taiwan to change media references to the team to "Taiwan". During the 2020 Summer Olympics, most TV channels referred to the ROC as Team Zhonghua while some channels preferred Team Taiwan (台灣隊).

==== 2017 Summer Universiade ====
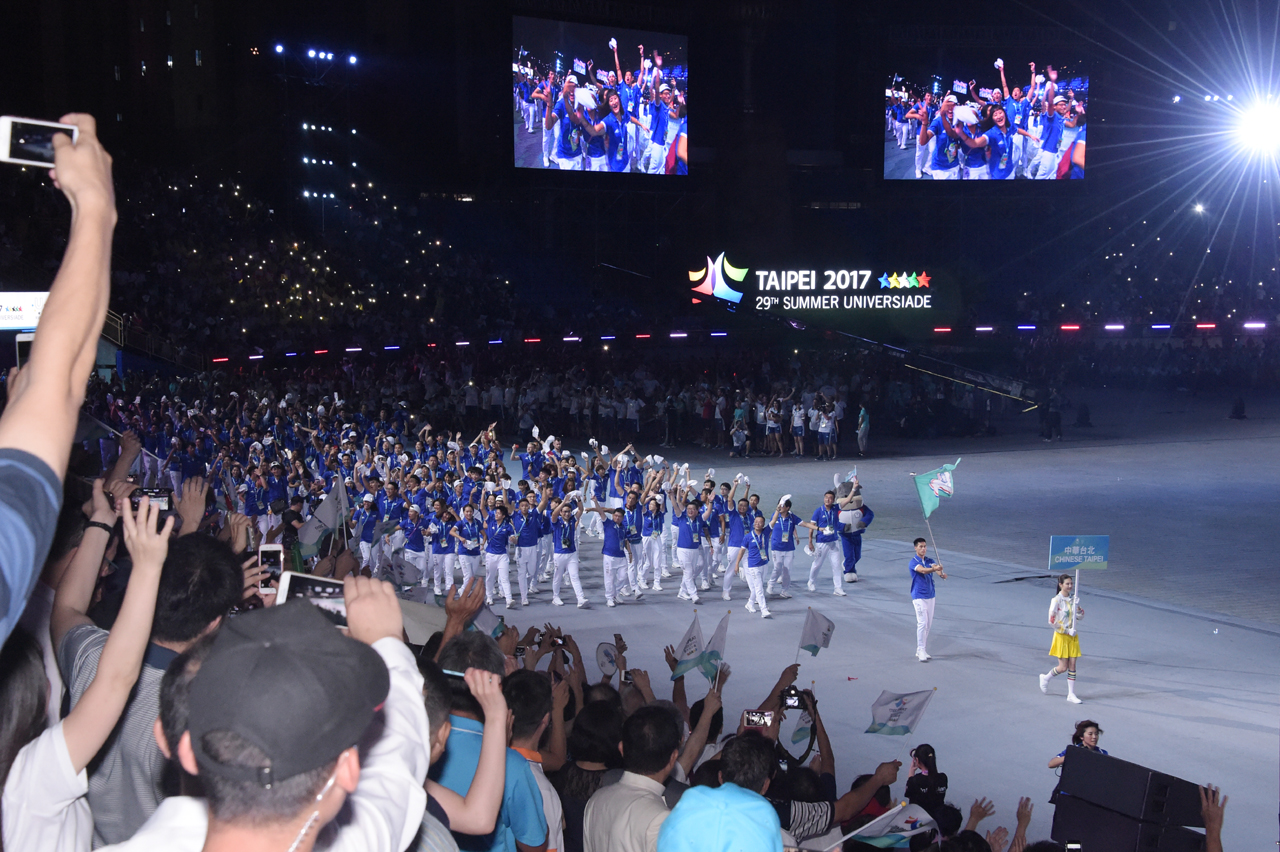
Chinese Taipei delegation at the 2017 Summer Universiade

Use of the label came under vigorous renewed criticism during the run-up to the 2017 Summer Universiade, hosted in Taiwan. An English-language guide to the Universiade was lambasted for its "absurd" use of the label. The guide was rendered nonsensically by completely avoiding the name "Taiwan" not only when referring to the label under which Taiwanese athletes compete, but even when referring to geographical features such as the island of Taiwan itself. These statements included "Introduction of our Island: ... Chinese Taipei is long and narrow that lies north to south", and "Chinese Taipei is a special island and its Capital Taipei is a great place to experience Taipei's culture."

In response, the guide was withdrawn and shortly thereafter re-issued with the designation "Taiwan" reinstated. Despite these corrections, hundreds of Taiwanese demonstrated in Taipei, demanding that Taiwan cease using "Chinese Taipei" at sporting events.

==== 2018 referendum ====
In February 2018, an alliance of civic organizations submitted a proposal to Taiwan's Central Election Commission (CEC). The proposed referendum asks if the nation should apply under the name of "Taiwan" for all international sports events, including the 2020 Tokyo Olympics. The proposal influenced the East Asian Olympic Committee (EAOC) to revoke Taichung's right to host the first East Asian Youth Games due to "political factors". An International Olympic Committee (IOC) representative reportedly said this was entirely the decision of the EAOC, and the IOC had no role in the ruling. The IOC also disapproved the altered name and sent three different warnings to the Chinese Taipei Olympic Committee ahead of the referendum vote, concerning the renaming issue which may disbar Taiwan from Olympic competitions.

Taiwanese people voted during the 2018 referendum to reject the proposal to change their official Olympic-designated name from Chinese Taipei to Taiwan. The main argument for opposing the name change was worrying that Taiwan may lose its Olympic membership under Chinese pressure, which would result in athletes unable to compete in the Olympics. Another proposal for the 2024 Summer Olympics was submitted to the Taiwan's CEC in 2021. The proposal was ultimately rejected by the CEC due to concerns that it might fall outside the scope of the Referendum Act of Taiwan, potentially rendering the Act inapplicable to the matter at hand.

== Other alternative references to Taiwan ==
The terminology used to refer to the Republic of China has varied according to the geopolitical situation. Initially, the Republic of China was known simply as "China" until 1971, when the People's Republic of China replaced the Republic of China as the exclusive legitimate representative of "China" at the United Nations. In order to distinguish the Republic of China from the People's Republic of China, there has been a growing current of support for the use of "Taiwan" in place of "China" to refer to the former.

=== Separate Customs Territory of Taiwan, Penghu, Kinmen and Matsu ===
In the World Trade Organization, the official full name of Taiwan is "Separate Customs Territory of Taiwan, Penghu, Kinmen and Matsu", while its official short name is "Chinese Taipei". (In the same way, the official full name of the PRC is "People's Republic of China", while its official short name is "China", as seen in both members' accession protocols.)

- Traditional Chinese: 臺澎金馬個別關稅領域
- Simplified Chinese: 台澎金马个别关税领域
Transcriptions
Standard Mandarin
- Hanyu Pinyin: Tái Péng Jīn Mǎ Gèbié Guānshuì Lǐngyù
- Bopomofo: ㄊㄞˊㄆㄥˊㄐㄧㄣ ㄇㄚˇㄍㄜˋㄅㄧㄝˊㄍㄨㄢ ㄕㄨㄟˋㄌㄧㄥˇㄩˋ
- Gwoyeu Romatzyh: Tair Perng Jin Maa Gehbye Guanshuey Liingyuh
- Wade–Giles: T'ai^{2} P'eng^{2} Chin^{1} Ma^{3} Ko^{4}-pieh^{2} Kuan^{1}-shui^{4} Ling^{3}-yü^{4}
- Tongyong Pinyin: Tái Péng Jin Mǎ Gè-bié Guan-shuèi Lǐng-yù
- MPS2: Tái Péng Jīn Mǎ Gèbié Guānshuèi Lǐngyù
- IPA: [tʰǎɪ pʰə̌ŋ tɕín mà kɤ̂.pjě kwán.ʂwêɪ lìŋ.ŷ]
Southern Min
- Hokkien POJ: Tâi-phêⁿ-Kim-bé Kò-piàt Koan-sòe Léng-hèk
- Tâi-lô: Tâi-phêⁿ-Kim-bé Kò-piàt Kuan-sùe Líng-hìk

As with "Chinese Taipei", the ROC and PRC also disagree on the Chinese translation of this name. The ROC uses Tái Pēng Jīn Mǎ Gèbié Guānshuì Lǐngyù (台澎金马个别关税领域; 臺澎金馬個別關稅領域; 'Separate Customs Territory of Taiwan', 'Penghu', 'Kinmen and Matsu'), while the PRC uses Zhōngguó Táiběi Dāndú Guānshuì Qū (中国台北单独关税区; 中國台北單獨關稅區; 'Separate Customs Region of Taipei', 'China') and Tái Pēng Jīn Mǎ Dāndú Guānshuì Qū (台澎金马单独关税区; 台澎金馬單獨關稅區; 'Separate Customs Region of Taiwan', 'Penghu', 'Kinmen and Matsu').

=== Taiwan, Province of China ===
International organizations in which the PRC participates generally do not recognize Taiwan or allow its membership. Thus, for example, whenever the United Nations makes reference to Taiwan, which does not appear on its member countries list, it uses the designation "Taiwan, Province of China", and organizations that follow UN standards usually do the same, such as the International Organization for Standardization in its listing of ISO 3166-1 country codes. Certain web-based postal address programs also label the country designation name for Taiwan as "Taiwan, Province of China".

Taiwan's Ministry of Foreign Affairs objected to the term together with other names including "Taiwan, China", "Taipei, China" and "Chinese Taiwan" in guidelines issued in 2018.

=== Island of Taiwan/Formosa ===
The term island of Taiwan or Formosa is used sometimes to avoid any misunderstanding about the Taiwan independence movement just referring to the island.

=== China or Republic of China ===
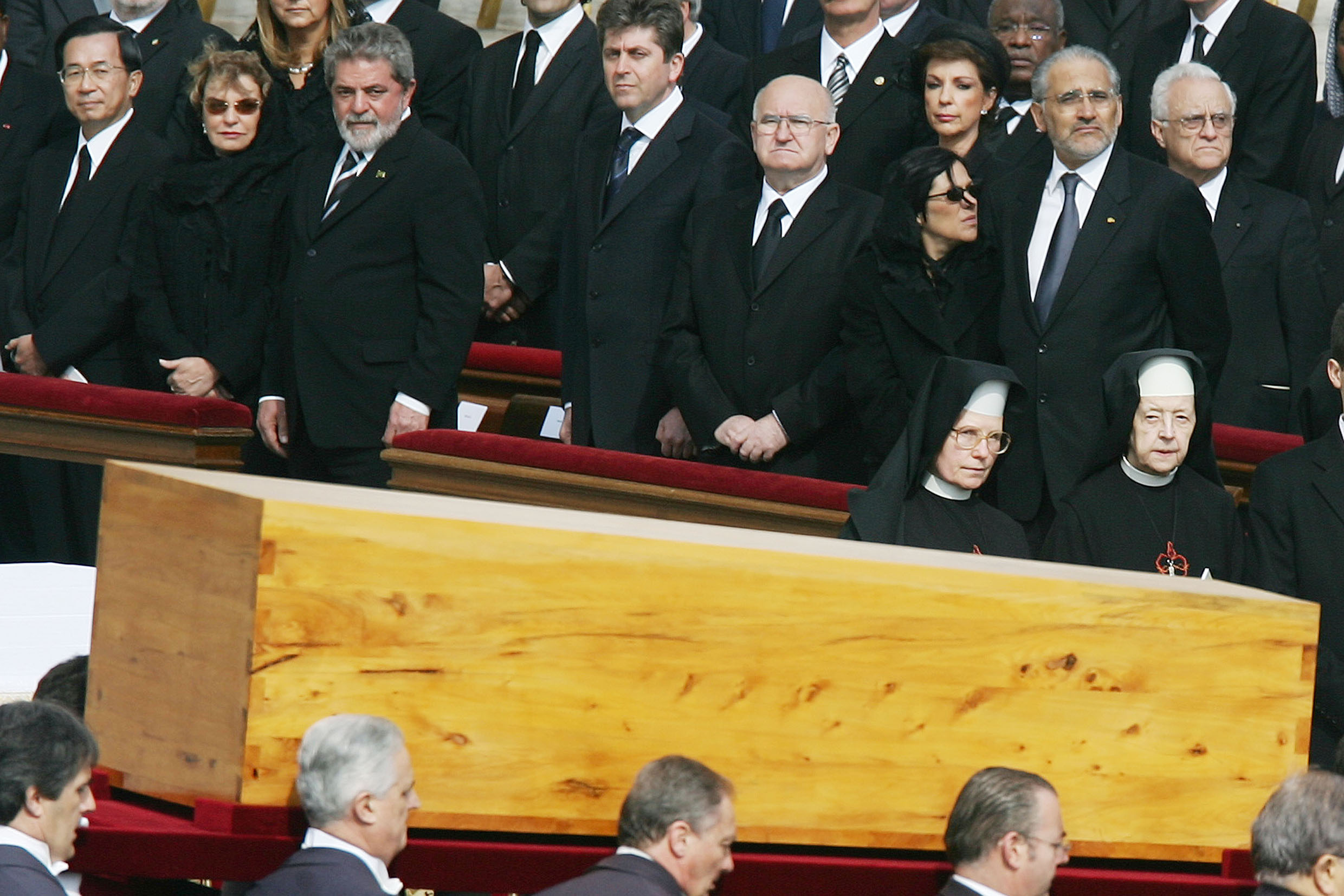
President Chen Shui-bian (far left) who attended the funeral of Pope John Paul II was seated in the first row in French alphabetical order beside the then-first lady and president of Brazil.

Some non-governmental organizations which the PRC does not participate in continue to use "China" or the "Republic of China". The World Organization of the Scout Movement is one of the few international organizations that continue to use the name of "Republic of China", and the ROC affiliate as the Scouts of China. This is because Scouting in mainland China is very limited or not really active. Likewise, Freemasonry is outlawed in the PRC and thus the Grand Lodge of China is based in Taiwan.

=== Governing authorities on Taiwan and TECRO ===
The United States uses the term "governing authorities on Taiwan" in the Taiwan Relations Act, officially defining the term "Taiwan" to "include...the islands of Taiwan and the Pescadores...and the governing authorities on Taiwan recognized by the United States as the Republic of China prior to 1 January 1979." Geographically and following the similar content in the earlier defense treaty from 1955, it excludes the other islands or archipelagos under the control of the Republic of China, such as Kinmen and the Matsu Islands.

In some contexts and agencies such as in Defense Security Cooperation Agency's notices of arms sales approvals, the government of Taiwan is formally represented under the name of Taipei Economic and Cultural Representative Office (TECRO) in the United States, which practically serves as ROC's de facto embassy and diplomatic mission to the US.

=== Other non-specified areas ===
The United Nations publishes population projections for each nation, with nations grouped under geographic area; in 2015, the East Asia group contained an entry named "Other non-specified areas" referring to Taiwan. However, the 2017 publication updated the entry's name to the UN's preferred "Taiwan, Province of China".

== Gallery of Chinese Taipei flags ==
Flag of the Republic of China, origin of the Blue Sky with a White Sun symbol used in Olympic and other "Chinese Taipei" flags

Chinese Taipei Olympic flag

Chinese Taipei Paralympic flag

Chinese Taipei Deaflympics flag

Chinese Taipei FISU World University Games (Universiade) flag

Chinese Taipei WorldSkills flag

Chinese Taipei FIRST Robotics Competition flag

Chinese Taipei volleyball flag

Flag of Chinese Taipei used in the Overwatch World Cup

Chinese Taipei Gymnasiade flag.

== See also ==
- Foreign relations of Taiwan
- History of the Republic of China
- Sports in Taiwan
- Chinese Taipei at the Olympics
- Chinese Taipei at the Paralympics
- Chinese Taipei at the AFC Asian Cup
- Chinese Taipei at the Asian Games
- Chinese Taipei at the Hopman Cup
- Chinese Taipei at the Universiade
