= Yan Huang Zisun =

Demonym of the Han Chinese

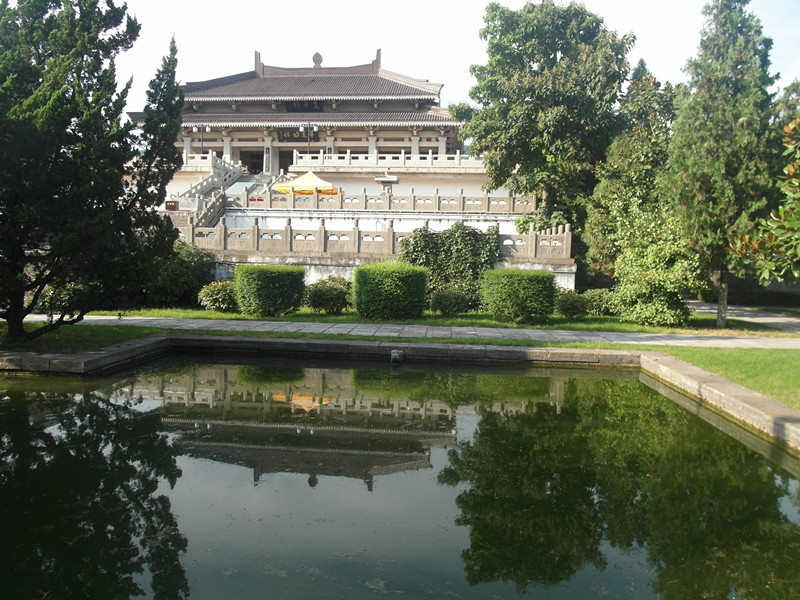
A temple dedicated to the worship of Yandi in Baoji, Shaanxi

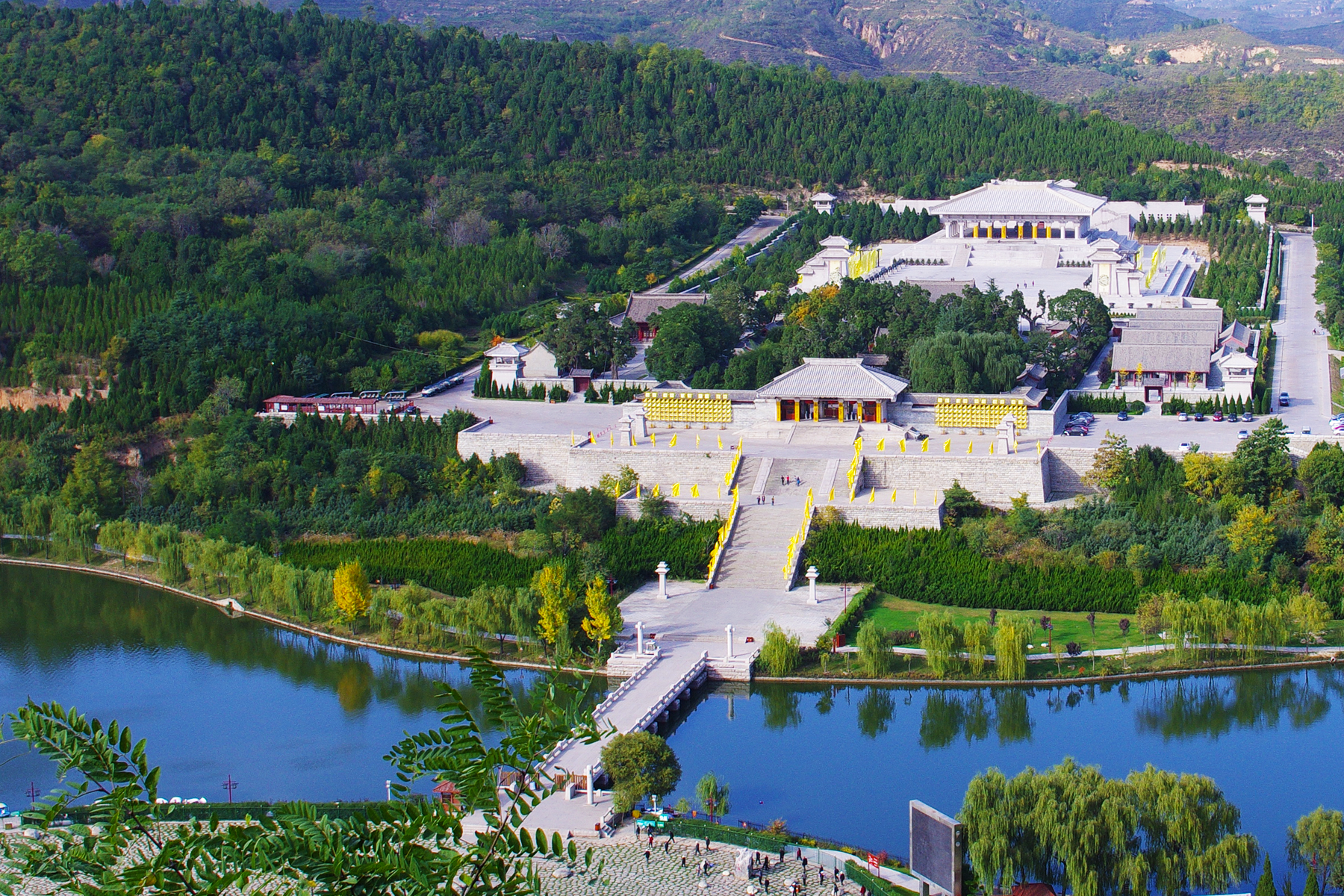
Xuanyuan Temple, dedicated to the worship of Huangdi, in Yan'an, Shaanxi

Yan Huang Zisun (Chinese: 炎黃子孫; lit. 'Descendants of Yan[di] and Huang[di]') is a term that represents the Chinese people and denotes an ethnocultural identity rooted in a shared ancestry linked to mythological origins.

This term refers to Yandi (炎帝) and Huangdi (黃帝), two legendary figures regarded as the ancestral founders of the Huaxia people, who are themselves considered the progenitors of the Han people. More specifically, the expression primarily applies to the Han ethnic group, as it does not include groups that do not trace their lineage to these legendary ancestors.

== Modern usage ==
To this day, the Chinese still refer to themselves with this term.

Ma Ying-jeou, who served as President of the Republic of China (Taiwan), used this term to refer to all Chinese people in the context of his view on cross-strait relations. The derivation of the term is mentioned as Yan Huang Shizhou (炎黃世胄) in the National Flag Anthem of the Republic of China.

== See also ==
- Emperors Yan and Huang (monument)
- Huaxia, confederation of pre-Qin peoples.
  - Yanhuang, an ancestral group around the Yellow River.
