= Huang Tzu =

Chinese composer (1904–1938)

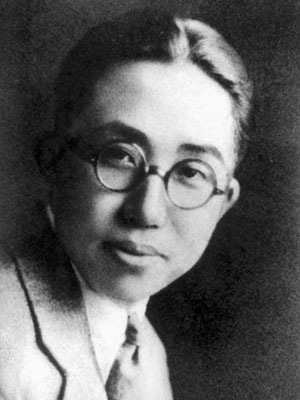

Background information
- Born: 23 March 1904; Shanghai, China
- Died: 9 May 1938 (aged 34)
- Genres: Classical Chinese music, Choir, Symphony
- Occupation: Composer

Huang Tzu (simplified Chinese: 黄自; traditional Chinese: 黃自; pinyin: Huáng Zì; Wade–Giles: Huang Tzu; 23 March 1904 - 9 May 1938), courtesy name Jinwu (Chinese: 今吾; pinyin: Jīnwú; Wade–Giles: Chin-wu), was a Chinese composer of the early 20th century.

== Life ==
Huang was born in Chuansha, Shanghai, during the final years of the Qing Dynasty. His father Huang Hongpei was a factory manager, and his mother Lu Meixian founded the first women’s school in Shanghai. He was also a distant relative of Huang Yanpei. He was accepted into Tsinghua College in 1916 and was introduced to Western music there. While at Tsinghua, he studied piano and vocal music, and was well-known within the local community. At that time, he was also influenced by the May Fourth Movement, which occurred in 1919.

After his graduation in 1924, Huang went on to study psychology in Oberlin College in Ohio, United States, assisted by the Boxer Indemnity Scholarship. There, he studied music theory, sight-singing, dictation, and keyboard harmony. In 1928, he was accepted into Yale University, where he studied Western music. At Yale, he composed the overture In Memoriam (also known as Nostalgia), which was the first large-scale orchestral work by a Chinese composer and was first played at the Yale School of Music's graduation concert in 1929.

In 1929, Huang returned to China and taught in the University of Shanghai, National Music College and other music schools. After the Mukden Incident in 1931, Huang wrote patriotic songs such as Resist the Enemy Song (抗敌歌). During this time, he also faced censorship from the Chinese government, and had to change "enemy" for "Japan" in the song's title. In 1935, he established the Shanghai Orchestra, the first all-Chinese orchestra. Some of his students, including He Luting, Ding Shande, Zhu Ying, Jiang Dingxian, Lin Sheng, Lin Shengxi and Liu Xue'an, became famous musicians later.

== Works ==
Huang's best-known works include: Philosophical Song (天倫歌); Plum Blossoms in the Snow (踏雪尋梅), a 1933 large cantata based on Bai Juyi's poem Chang hen ge; Flower in the Mist (花非花); Lotus Song (採蓮謠); Benshi (本事). He also composed the National Flag Anthem of the Republic of China. Huang died of typhoid fever in Shanghai in 1938.

=== List by year ===
Title	Year	Instrumentation	Text
Nostalgia (怀旧)	1929	Orchestra	N/A
Missing Homeland (思乡)	1932	Voice and piano	Wei Hanzhang
Spring Nostalgia (春思曲)	1932	Voice and piano	Wei Hanzhang
Three Wishes From a Rose (玫瑰三愿)	1932	Voice, violin, and piano	Long Qi
Present to the Front Line Soldiers (赠前敌将士)	1932		He Xiangning
West Lake After Rain (雨后西湖)	1933		Wei Hanzhang
September 18 (九一八)	1933		Wei Hanzhang
Plum Blossoms in the Snow (踏雪寻梅)	1933		Liu Xue'an
Down to Jiangling (下江陵)	1933		Li Bai
Flower in the Mist (花非花)	1933	Voice and piano	Bai Juyi
Ode to Ascending the Tower (点绛唇 · 赋登楼)	1934	Voice and piano	Wang Zhuo
Students' Year of National Goods Song (学生国货年歌)	1934		Huang Yanpei
Thoughts on Climbing Beigu Pavilion in Jingkou (南乡子·登京口北固亭有怀)	1934		Xin Qiji
Composed in Residence at Huangzhou Dinghui Garden (卜算子·黄州定慧院寓居作)	1934		Su Shi
The West Wind's Words (西风的话)	1934		Liao Fushu
Swallow Speak (燕语)	1934		Wei Hanzhang
Sleeping Lion (睡狮)	1934		Wei Hanzhang
Lotus Song (采莲谣)	1934		Wei Hanzhang
Philosophical Song (天伦歌)	1936		Zhong Shigen
Song of Enthusiasm (热血歌)	1937		Wu Zonghai
