= Searching for Plum Blossoms in Snow =

"Searching for Plum Blossoms in the Snow"

Song
- Language: Chinese
- Genre: Folk
- Songwriter: Liu Xue An
- Composer: Huang Tzu

"Searching for Plum Blossoms in Snow" (Chinese: 踏雪尋梅; pinyin: tàxuěxúnméi ), is a popular Chinese folk song with music written by the Chinese composer Huang Tzu and lyrics by Liu Xue An. The song describes riding a donkey into the snow to gather plum blossoms and hearing the chiming off bells. The song is often included in compilations of children's music.

== Translated lyrics ==
After snow, sunny day! Plum blossoms scent the air

Ride my donkey past the bridge, his bell sounds ding dong.
Sounds ding dong! Sounds ding dong! Sounds ding dong! Sounds ding dong!

Such lovely flowers beside my chair! I read and play music, such a happy time!
