= Emperors Yan and Huang =

Monumental sculpture in China

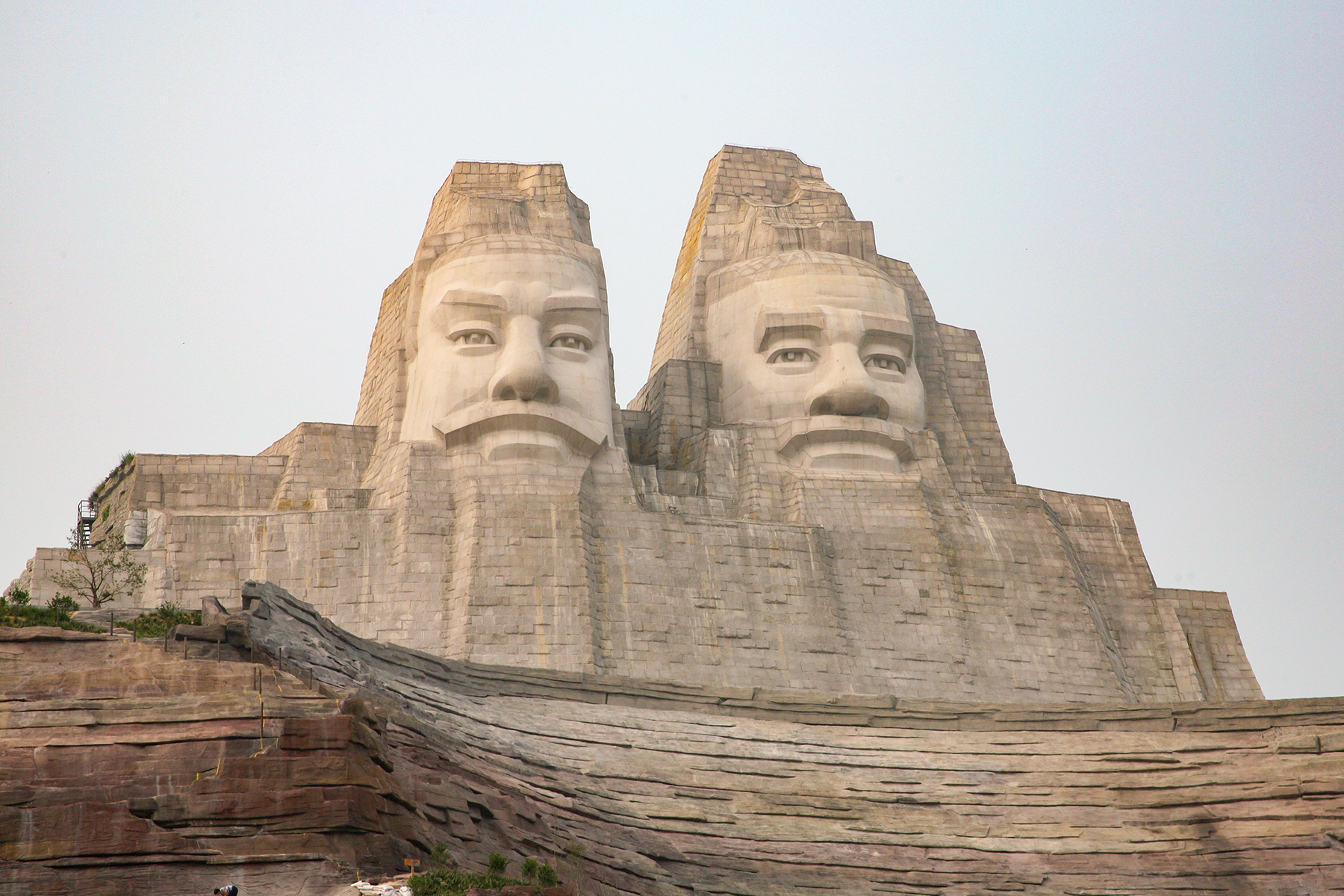
- Interactive map of Emperors Yan and Huang
- Location: Yan Huang Plaza, Zhengzhou, Henan, China
- Coordinates: 34.9514°N 113.5110°E
- Type: statue
- Height: 106 metres (348 ft)
- Beginning date: 1991
- Completion date: 2007
- Dedicated to: Yan Emperor and Yellow Emperor

The sculpture of Emperors Yan and Huang is a monument in China that was carved from a mountain on the Yellow River. The overall monument height is 106 metres (348 ft); a 55-meter base platform with 51-meter busts on top. They depict the two mythical emperors known as Yan Emperor (Yandi) and Yellow Emperor (Huangdi). The construction lasted 20 years and was completed in 2007, at a cost of US$22.5 million. They are located in Zhengzhou, the capital of Henan province, People's Republic of China. The statues commemorate politics and the economy.

== History ==
In 1987, Wang Renmin, a key figure at a Zhengzhou City tourist attraction, was inspired during visits to Singapore and the United States, where he encountered strong support for the concept of Yan and Huang Emperors' descendants. This inspired him to propose building a sculpture of the emperors by the Yellow River. On October 15, 1987, Wang Renmin announced plans for the sculpture and initiated a global donation campaign. Over the next five years, he lobbied extensively. In 1988, the Yanhuang Emperor Giant Sculpture Preparatory Committee was formed in Beijing, followed by the establishment of the national Chinese Yanhuang Culture Research Association on May 10, 1991. The foundation for the sculpture was laid on September 12, 1991, and construction began in September 1994 but faced funding issues. In 2004, the project was handed over to the Zhengzhou Municipal Government and became a key city project. With government and investment support, construction progressed smoothly, culminating in the statue's inauguration on April 18, 2007.

== Construction ==
The giant sculpture, standing 106 meters tall, combines a mountain and human figures, symbolizing unity. It surpasses the Statue of Liberty in height by 8 meters and the Motherland Calls in Russia by 2 meters. The sculpture features Emperor Yan and Emperor Huang, with identical facial features. Their eyes are 3 meters long, and their noses are 8 meters long. The faces together cover over 1,000 square meters. The sculpture is made from over 7,000 cubic meters of concrete, 1,500 tons of steel, and 6,000 cubic meters of granite, all sourced from Taihang Mountain. The project cost approximately 180 million yuan.

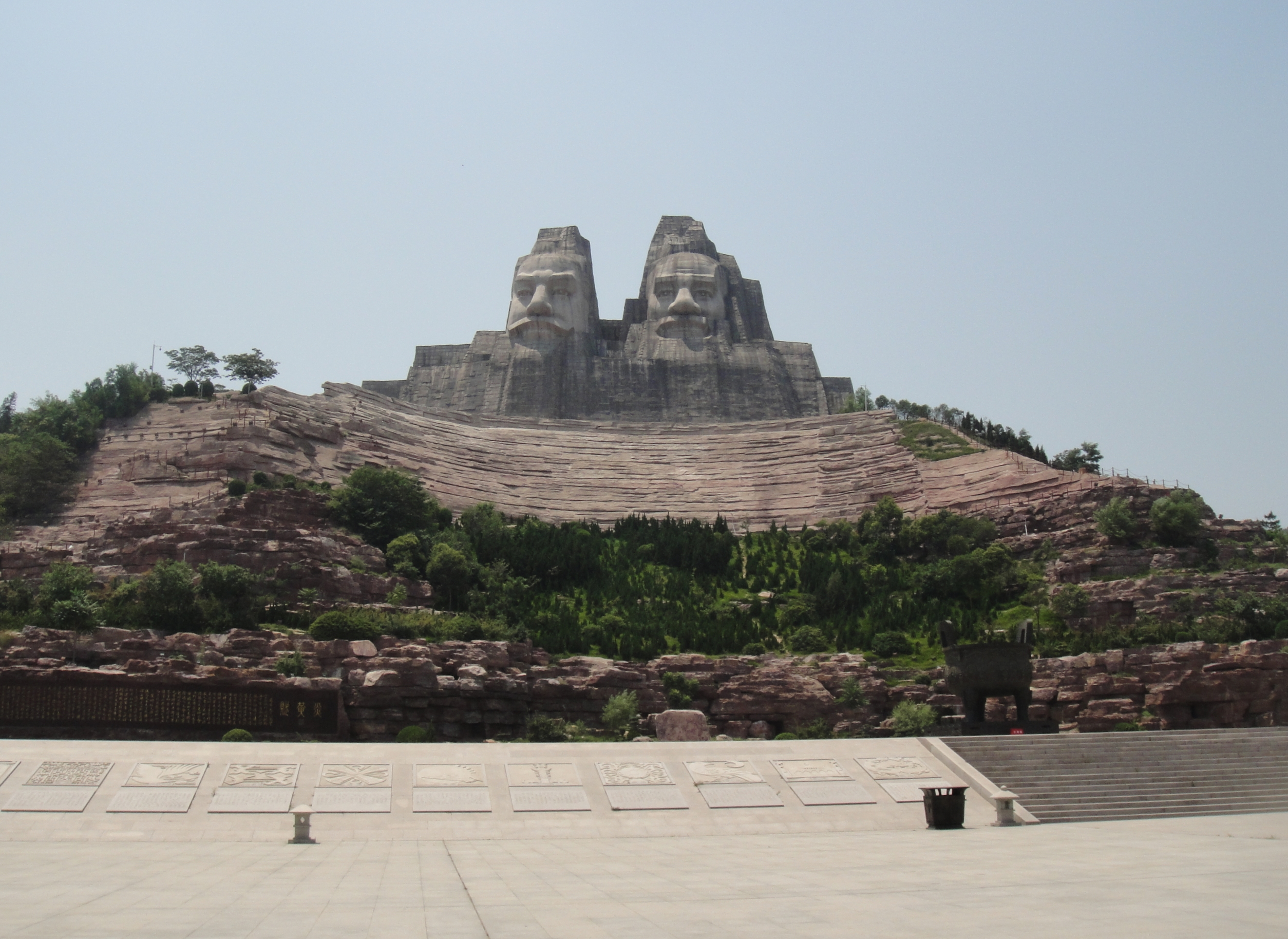

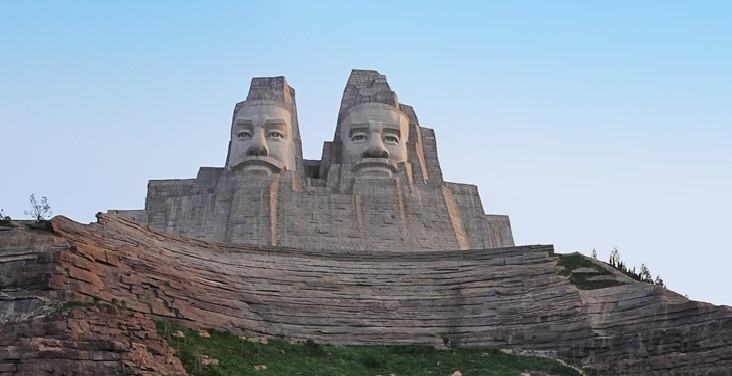

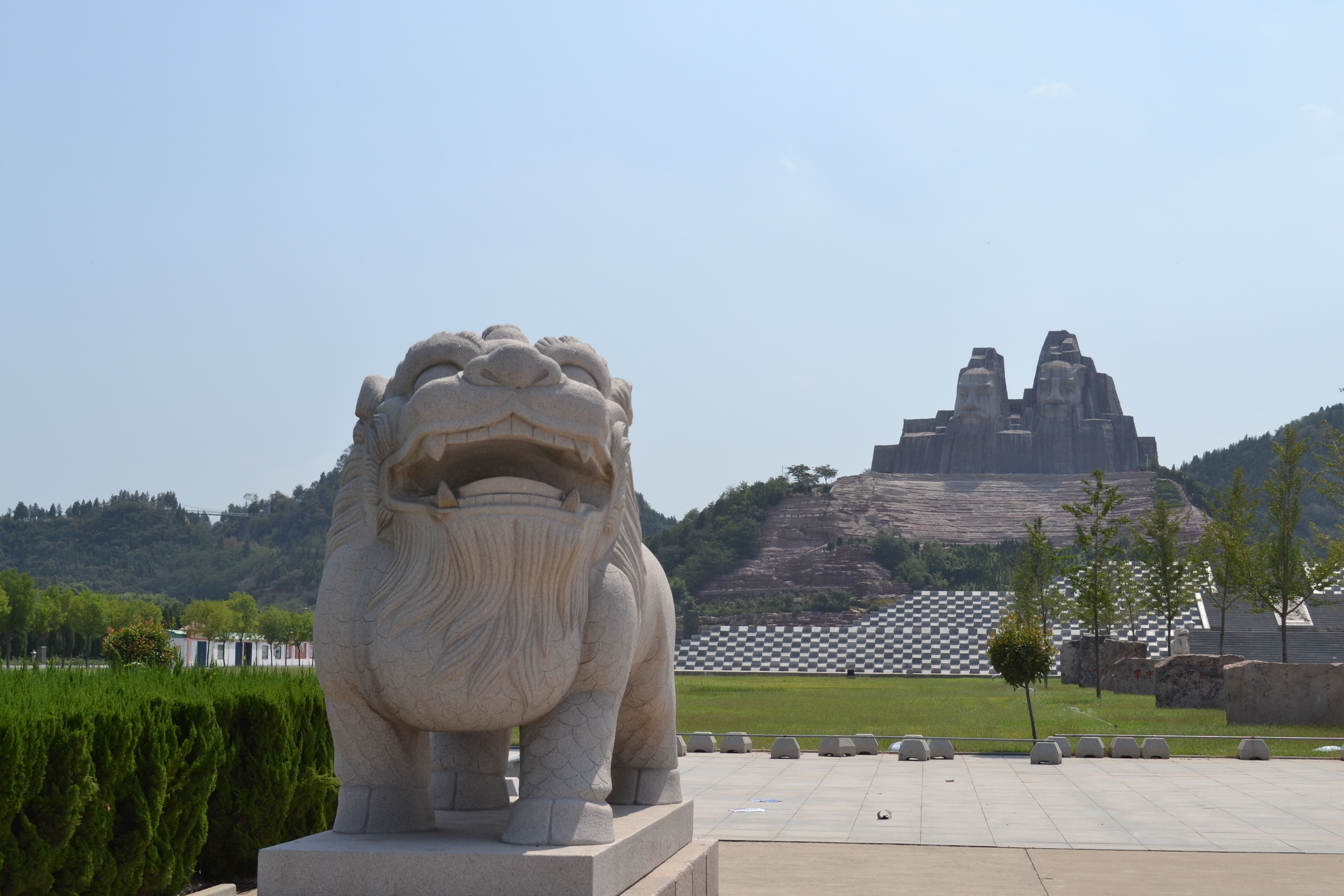

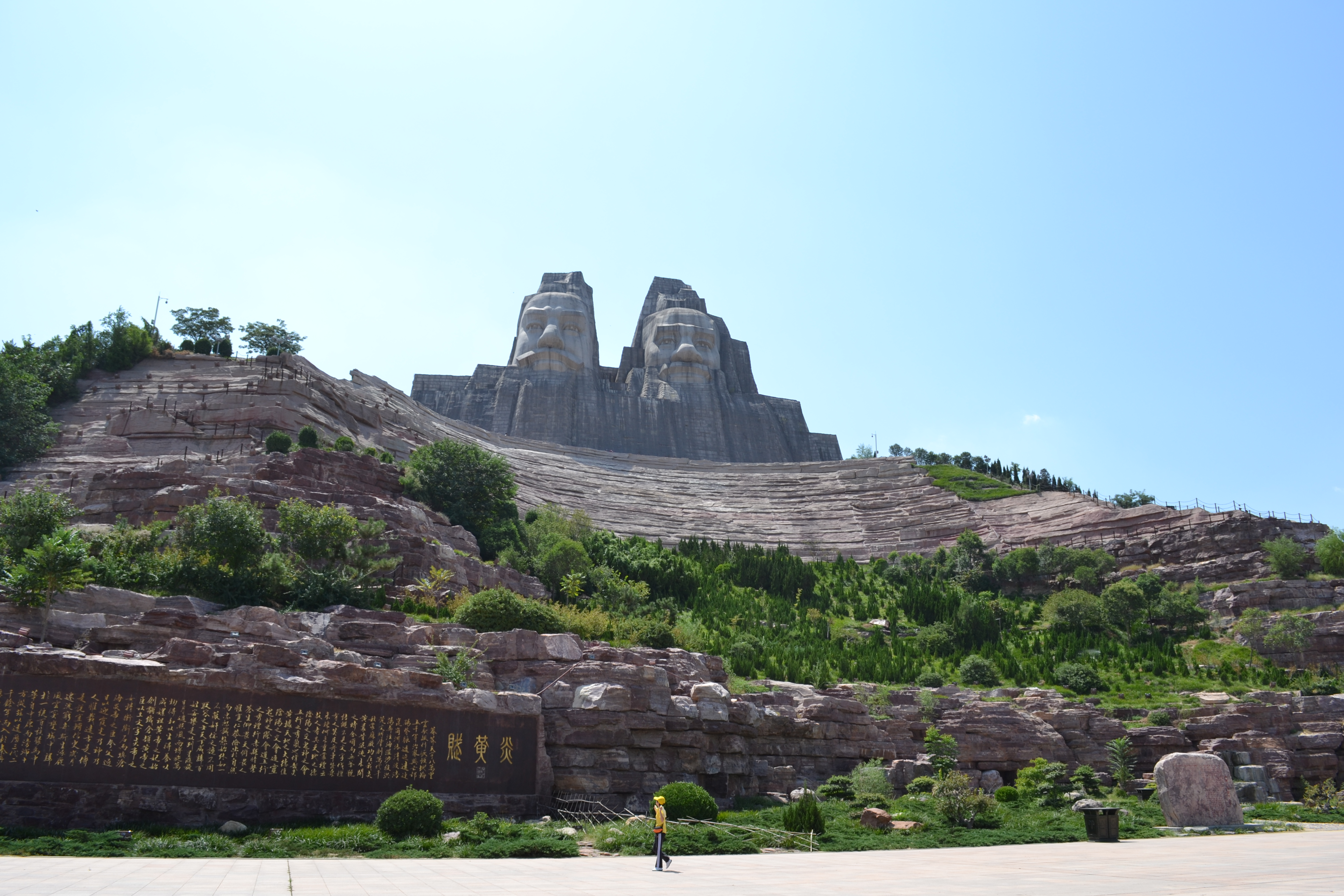

== See also ==
- Yanhuang
- List of tallest statues
- Three Sovereigns and Five Emperors
- Yan Huang Zisun
