= Great Unity =

Utopian vision in Chinese philosophy

Chinese name
- Chinese: 大同
Transcriptions
Standard Mandarin
- Hanyu Pinyin: dàtóng
- Bopomofo: ㄉㄚˋㄊㄨㄥˊ
- Wade–Giles: ta^{4}t'ung^{2}
- Tongyong Pinyin: dàtóng
Wu
- Romanization: da^{去} don^{平}
Hakka
- Romanization: tai^{55} tung^{11}
Yue: Cantonese
- Jyutping: daai^{6} tung^{4}
Southern Min
- Hokkien POJ: tāi-tông

Vietnamese name
- Vietnamese alphabet: Đại đồng
- Hán-Nôm: 大同

Korean name
- Hangul: 대동
- Hanja: 大同
Transcriptions
- Revised Romanization: daedong
- McCune–Reischauer: taedong

Japanese name
- Kanji: 大同
- Kana: だいどう
Transcriptions
- Revised Hepburn: daidō

The Great Unity (Chinese: 大同; pinyin: dàtóng), also translated as Grand Union, Great Equality or Universal Harmony, or Great Harmony, is a Chinese vision of the ideal world originating in ancient Chinese philosophy, which was based on the idealized image of the values of "eminent men of the three dynasties" (Xia, Shang, Zhou) as understood by the Confucian tradition. In this ideal societal model, everyone and everything was at peace and lived in harmony and mutual-support, and its advocates believed in the need to restore such a model of society. Although it is found in classical Chinese philosophy as a model based on the idealized past, modern intellectuals adapted the concept beginning with Kang Youwei (1858 – 1927), often combining it with utopian ideas.

== History ==
Confucius said: “When the Great Way prevailed, it was shared by the whole world. (天下為公) The men of worth and ability were chosen; trust was spoken and harmony cultivated. Therefore people did not cherish only their own parents, nor nurture only their own children. The aged were able to complete their years, the strong had employment, the young were able to grow, and the widowed, the orphaned, the solitary, the childless, the disabled, and the sick were all provided for. Men had their proper roles, women their proper homes. Goods were disliked if they lay wasted upon the ground, yet it was not necessary that they be stored for one’s own use; strength was disliked if it were not exerted, yet it was not necessary that it be exerted for oneself alone. Hence schemes were shut away and did not arise; theft, robbery, and disorder did not occur. Therefore outer doors were left open and not closed. This was called the ‘Great Unity’ (Datong).” — Confucius, Book of Rites (Liji), “Liyun”

The notion of the "Great Unity" appeared in the "Lǐyùn" (禮運) chapter of the Book of Rites, one of the Confucian Chinese classics. According to it, the society in Great Unity was ruled by the public, where the people elected men of virtue and ability to administer, and valued trust and amity. People did not only love their own parents and children, but others as well. People also secured the living of the elderly until their ends, let the adults be of use to the society, and helped the young grow. Those who were widowed, orphaned, childless, handicapped and diseased were all taken care of. Men took their responsibilities and women had their homes. People disliked seeing resources being wasted but did not seek to possess them; they wanted to exert their strength but did not do it for their own benefit. Therefore, selfish thoughts were dismissed, people refrained from stealing and robbery, and the outer doors remained open.

The concept was used by Kang Youwei in his visionary utopian treatise, The Book of Great Unity (Chinese: 大同書). He also described "moderate prosperity" as the stage before the Great Unity. Kang's disciple Tan Sitong equated the Chinese Great Unity ideal with Edward Bellamy's socialist utopia in Looking Backward. Early Chinese socialist Jiang Kanghu used datong as the translation for "socialism".

The Great Unity is also often mentioned in the writings of Sun Yat-sen and is included in his lyrics of the National Anthem of the Republic of China, currently in official use in Taiwan.

This ideology can be reflected in the following examples, each from a national anthem of the Republic of China:

- 「三民主義，吾黨所宗，以建民國，以進大同。」 (literal translation: "Three Principles of the People, the aim of us (The Kuomintang), to build the Republic, to advance into Great Unity.") - National Anthem of the Republic of China
- 「毋自暴自棄，毋故步自封，光我民族，促進大同。」(literal translation: "Never abandon in desperation, nor being complacent with achievement; Glorify our nation and work promoting Great Unity.") - National Flag Anthem of the Republic of China

One of the early forerunners of the Chinese Communist Party (CCP) was the Great Unity Party (大同黨), which was formed by student activist Yao Zuobin and supported by the Communist International (Comintern). For the student activists, the term "Great Unity" (alternatively translated as "Great Equality") was equated with the idea of "equality of people in a socialist world". One of the early translations for "communism" into Chinese was datong zhuyi (datong-ism), which links itself to the ancient Chinese concept of "great harmony" of "all under heaven", without specifying the means to accomplish those ideals. Early CCP leader Guo Moruo was also initially drawn to communism as he interpreted Confucius' writings on datong to be equivalent to the communist critique of private ownership, and believed that Karl Marx's promise of a cosmopolitan paradise was the same as the Confucian dream of datong. Guo also wrote a short story in 1925 entitled "Marx enters a Confucian temple" where a hypothetical Karl Marx and Confucius converse and conclude that Marxism is the same ideal as datong. Mao Zedong continued along with these ideas throughout his revolutionary career. He emphasized the importance given to datong in Sun Yat-sen's revolutionary program, theorizing that China's liberation from colonialism would be the only way for it to participate in an international movement "for world datong".

The concept was invoked in prominent occasions several times by Mao Zedong, including in his address On the People's Democratic Dictatorship in 1949, as the CCP prepared to assume control throughout mainland China. Mao said the CCP would create "conditions where classes, state power and political parties will die out very naturally" and that "China can develop steadily, under the leadership of the working class and the Communist Party, from an agricultural into an industrial country, and from a new-democratic into a socialist and communist society, [and then] can abolish classes and realize Great Unity".

== Religion And Great Unity ==
The "World Harmony (datong) Launch Ceremony", themed "Religious Harmony and World Peace", was solemnly held at the Guanyin Temple in Pingzhen District, Taoyuan City.

== Philosophical context ==
The concept of "Great Unity" originates from early Chinese philosophical debates on how to unify a society marked by division and conflict, particularly during the Warring States period. In the Book of Rites, the "Lǐyùn" (禮運) chapter presents datong as an ideal social and political order in which "the world is shared by all" (天下为公).

Scholars have noted that the idea of datong is closely related to the broader concept of tong (同), often translated as "unity" or "togetherness." However, recent interpretations suggest that tong more precisely refers to the process by which differences are brought into alignment or coordination, rather than eliminated.

== See also ==
- Harmonious Society
- Moderately prosperous society
- Great Peace (Baháʼí)
- Omega Point

== Bibliography ==
- Cheng, Chung-ying (2009). "On harmony as transformation: Paradigms from the Yijing". Philosophy of the Yi: Unity and dialectics. Malden: Wiley-Blackwell. ISBN 9781444334111.
- Pearce, Scott (2001). "Form and matter: Archaizing reform in sixth-century China". Culture and power in the reconstitution of the Chinese realm, 200-600. Cambridge: Harvard University Press. ISBN 9780674005235.
