= National Flag Anthem of the Republic of China =

中華民國國旗歌
- National Flag Anthem of the Republic of China
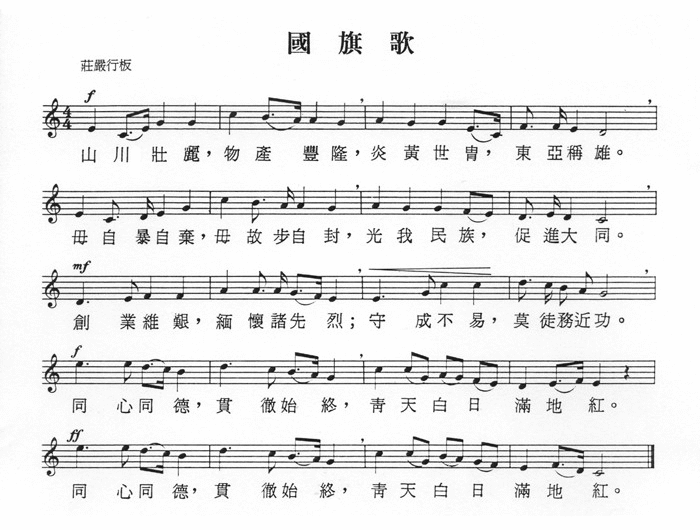
- The Sheet of National Flag Anthem
- Flag anthem of the Republic of China Sporting anthem of Chinese Taipei
- Also known as: 中華臺北奧會會歌 (English: "Anthem of the Chinese Taipei Olympic Committee") 中華臺北國歌 (English: National Anthem of Chinese Taipei)
- Lyrics: Disputed (usually attributed to Tai Chi-tao and sometimes Liang Desuo), 1937
- Music: Huang Tzu, 1936
- Adopted: 1937 (mainland China); 1945 (Taiwan)

Audio sample
- "National Flag Anthem of the Republic of China" (instrumental): file; help

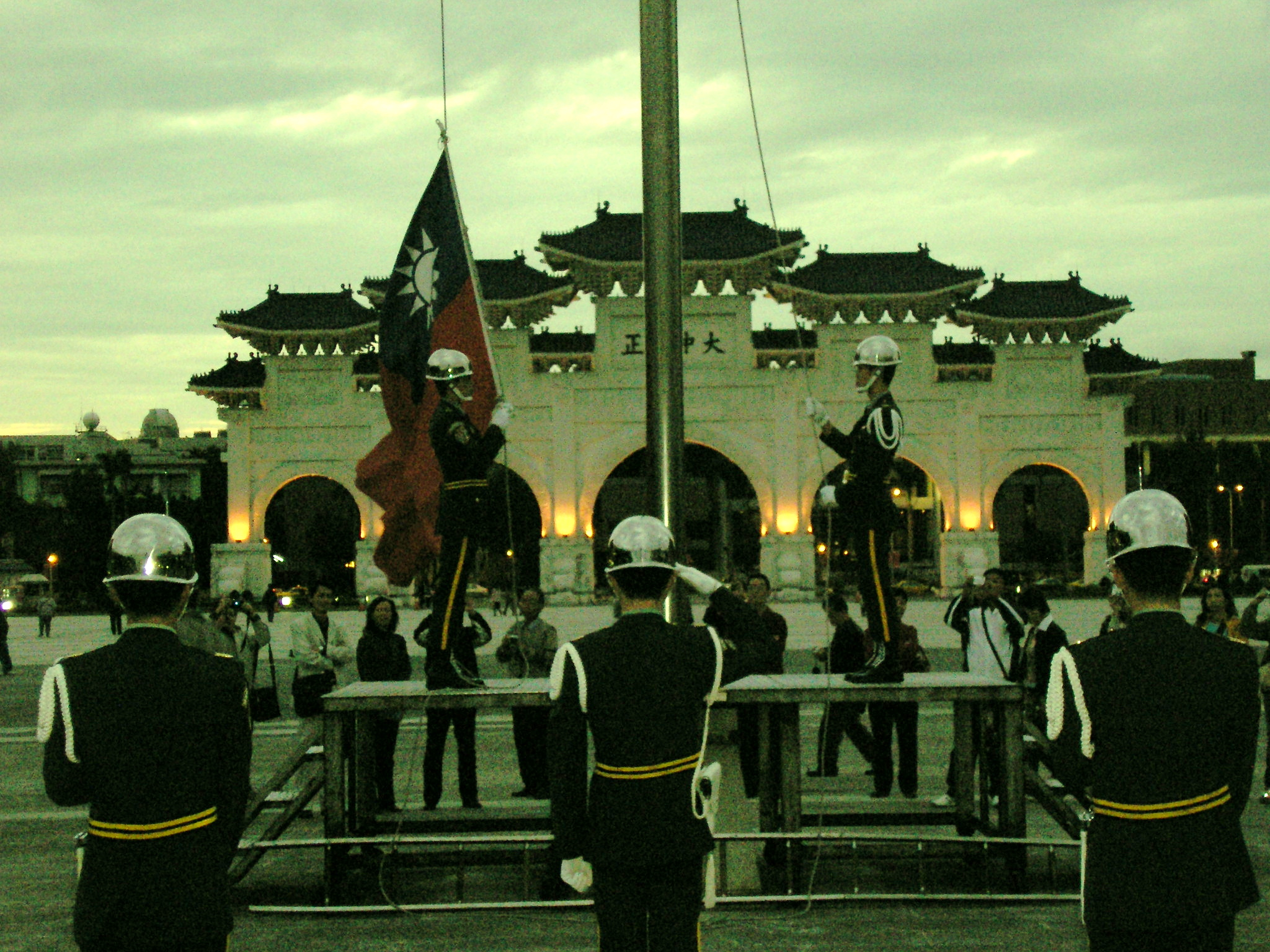
The National Banner Song is played during the raising and lowering of the Republic of China national flag, such as at this daily ceremony at the front of the Chiang Kai-shek Memorial Hall in 2005, where the flag is lowered by the honor guards of ROC Navy.

The National Flag Anthem of the Republic of China (Chinese: 中華民國國旗歌; pinyin: Zhōnghuá Mínguó Guóqígē; Wade–Giles: Chung^{1}hua^{2} Min^{2}kuo^{2} Kuo^{2}chʻi^{2}ko^{1}) is a patriotic song typically played during the raising and lowering of the flag of the Republic of China. Domestically, the flag anthem is typically played immediately following the national anthem during flag ceremonies. It is also played at international sporting events such as the World Baseball Classic and Olympic Games, where Taiwan officially participates under the name of Chinese Taipei. The song is thus considered to be effectively a secondary national anthem; Republic of China nationals and supporters stand when it is performed and salute it as they would salute the national anthem.

== Origin ==
After the Kuomintang Anthem became the de facto National Anthem of the Republic of China in 1930, the Ministry of Education had invited submissions for a new official national anthem. The music composed by Huang Tzu was eventually chosen in 1936, but the Nationalist Government refused to adopt it as the national anthem. As a compromise, the National Anthem remained unchanged, while Huang Tzu's music was adopted as the National Flag Anthem, with lyrics written in Classical Chinese usually attributed to Tai Chi-tao, who had also contributed to the lyrics of the National Anthem.

=== Dispute of the author of lyrics ===
According to Liu Yiling from the National Library of the Republic of China, there remains a dispute over the authorship of the lyrics. In some earlier publications, the lyrics were attributed as an anonymous work. However, later publications attributed it to Tai Chi-tao, who did compose a song with the title "National Flag Anthem" in 1928. Nevertheless, that work was very different from the current version. In 1929, Liang Desuo published "Blue Sky, White Sun, and a Wholly Red Earth", and some attribute the authorship of the National Flag Anthem to him due to the resemblance between that work and the current lyrics.

== Use ==
Since 1983, the song (officially with different lyrics) has been used at Olympic competitions instead of the National Anthem due to pressure from the Chinese Olympic Committee and the International Olympic Committee. This also changed the symbols used by Taiwan during the Olympics and other sporting events, and their name officially changed to "Chinese Taipei" (中華臺北). During the 2004 Summer Olympics, Chinese Taipei won its first gold medals, and the Banner Song was played at the ceremonial raising of the flag of the gold medal team. When introduced, the song is officially called the "National Anthem of Chinese Taipei." However, in the 16th Asian Games held in Guangzhou, China, the song was introduced as the "Anthem of the Chinese Taipei Olympic Committee" (中華臺北奧會會歌), with new lyrics written by Chang Pi-te (張彼德). In schools and national monuments in Taiwan, the National Anthem and the National Flag Anthem are played every morning before classes or opening at an outdoor ceremony. The national anthem is sung while the flag is being held before raising and the National Flag Anthem is played when the National Flag is raised. When the flag is lowered, only the National Flag Anthem is played.

During the 2017 Summer Universiade held in Taipei, Taiwan, the song was introduced as the "National Anthem of Chinese Taipei."

== Lyrics ==
=== Original ===
Traditional Chinese
(with Bopomofo)

山川(ㄕㄢ ㄔㄨㄢ)壯麗(ㄓㄨㄤˋ ㄌㄧˋ)，物產(ㄨˋ ㄔㄢˇ)豐(ㄈㄥ)隆(ㄌㄨㄥˊ)，炎黃(ㄧㄢˊ ㄏㄨㄤˊ)世(ㄕˋ)胄(ㄓㄡˋ)，東亞(ㄉㄨㄥ ㄧㄚˇ)稱雄(ㄔㄥ ㄒㄩㄥˊ)。
毋(ㄨˊ)自暴自棄(ㄗˋ ㄅㄠˋ ㄗˋ ㄑㄧˋ)，毋(ㄨˊ)故步自封(ㄍㄨˋ ㄅㄨˋ ㄗˋ ㄈㄥ)，光(ㄍㄨㄤ)我(ㄨㄛˇ)民族(ㄇㄧㄣˊ ㄗㄨˊ)，促進(ㄘㄨˋ ㄐㄧㄣˋ)大同(ㄉㄚˋ ㄊㄨㄥˊ)。
創業(ㄔㄨㄤˋ ㄧㄝˋ)維(ㄨㄟˊ)艱(ㄐㄧㄢ)，緬懷(ㄇㄧㄢˇ ㄏㄨㄞˊ)諸(ㄓㄨ)先烈(ㄒㄧㄢ ㄌㄧㄝˋ)；守成(ㄕㄡˇ ㄔㄥˊ)不易(ㄅㄨˋ ㄧˋ)，莫(ㄇㄛˋ)徒(ㄊㄨˊ)務(ㄨˋ)近(ㄐㄧㄣˋ)功(ㄍㄨㄥ)。
同心(ㄊㄨㄥˊ ㄒㄧㄣ)同(ㄊㄨㄥˊ)德(ㄉㄜˊ)，貫徹(ㄍㄨㄢˋ ㄔㄜˋ)始終(ㄕˇ ㄓㄨㄥ)，青天白日(ㄑㄧㄥ ㄊㄧㄢ ㄅㄞˊ ㄖˋ)滿(ㄇㄢˇ)地(ㄉㄧˋ)紅(ㄏㄨㄥˊ)。
同心(ㄊㄨㄥˊ ㄒㄧㄣ)同(ㄊㄨㄥˊ)德(ㄉㄜˊ)，貫徹(ㄍㄨㄢˋ ㄔㄜˋ)始終(ㄕˇ ㄓㄨㄥ)，青天白日(ㄑㄧㄥ ㄊㄧㄢ ㄅㄞˊ ㄖˋ)滿(ㄇㄢˇ)地(ㄉㄧˋ)紅(ㄏㄨㄥˊ)。

Simplified Chinese
(with Hanyu Pinyin)

山川(Shānchuān)壮丽(zhuànglì)，物产(wùchǎn)丰(fēng)隆(lóng)，炎黄(yánhuáng)世(shì)胄(zhòu)，东亚(dōngyǎ)称雄(chēngxióng)。
毋(Wú)自暴自弃(zìbàozìqì)，毋(Wú)故步自封(gùbùzìfēng)，光(guāng)我(wǒ)民族(mínzú)，促进(cùjìn)大同(dàtóng)。
创业(Chuàngyè)维(wéi)艰(jiān)，缅怀(miǎnhuái)诸(zhū)先烈(xiānliè)；守成(shǒuchéng)不易(búyì)，莫(mò)徒(tú)务(wù)近(jìn)功(gōng)。
同心(Tóngxīn)同(tóng)德(dé)，贯彻(guànchè)始终(shǐzhōng)，青天白日(qīngtiānbáirì)满(mǎn)地(dì)红(hóng)。
同心(Tóngxīn)同(tóng)德(dé)，贯彻(guànchè)始终(shǐzhōng)，青天白日(qīngtiānbáirì)满(mǎn)地(dì)红(hóng)。

English literal translation

Magnificent mountains and rivers, (with) bountiful and diverse goods;
Descendants of Yan and Huang, to be the heroes of East Asia.
Never abandon in desperation, nor be complacent with achievement,
Glorify our nation and work promoting Great Unity.
Pioneering work was full of hardships and (we should) commemorate those founders and martyrs,
Maintaining (their achievements) is not easy (either) and (we should) never seek only for instant benefit.
With one heart and one soul, carrying (these virtues) from beginning to end,
Blue Sky, White Sun, and a Wholly Red Earth.
(repeat last two lines)

=== For use as Chinese Taipei in Olympic events ===
Chinese Taipei Olympic Committee's Anthem share the same melody as the flag anthem, but with different lyrics written by Chang Pi-te. The lyrics were certified by the IOC in 1983.

Traditional Chinese
奧林匹克，奧林匹克，無分宗教，不論種族。

為促進友誼，為世界和平，五洲青年，聚會奧運。

公平競賽，創造新紀錄，得勝勿驕，失敗亦毋餒。

努力向前，更快更遠，奧林匹克永光輝。

努力向前，更快更強，奧林匹克永光輝。

Simplified Chinese
奥林匹克，奥林匹克，无分宗教，不论种族。

为促进友谊，为世界和平，五洲青年，聚会奥运。

公平竞赛，创造新纪录，得胜勿骄，失败亦毋馁。

努力向前，更快更远，奥林匹克永光辉。

努力向前，更快更强，奥林匹克永光辉。

Bopomofo
ㄠˋ ㄌㄧㄣˊ ㄆㄧˇ ㄎㄜˋ ， ㄠˋ ㄌㄧㄣˊ ㄆㄧˇ ㄎㄜˋ ， ㄨˊ ㄈㄣ ㄗㄨㄥ ㄐㄧㄠˋ ， ㄅㄨˋ ㄌㄨㄣˋ ㄓㄨㄥˇ ㄗㄨˊ 。

ㄨㄟˊ ㄘㄨˋ ㄐㄧㄣˋ ㄧㄡˇ ㄧˋ ， ㄨㄟˊ ㄕˋ ㄐㄧㄝˋ ㄏㄜˊ ㄆㄧㄥˊ ， ㄨˇ ㄓㄡ ㄑㄧㄥ ㄋㄧㄢˊ ， ㄐㄩˋ ㄏㄨㄟˋ ㄠˋ ㄩㄣˋ 。

ㄍㄨㄥ ㄆㄧㄥˊ ㄐㄧㄥˋ ㄙㄞˋ ， ㄔㄨㄤˋ ㄗㄠˋ ㄒㄧㄣ ㄐㄧˋ ㄌㄨˋ ， ㄉㄜˊ ㄕㄥˋ ㄨˋ ㄐㄧㄠ ， ㄕ ㄅㄞˋ ㄧˋ ㄨˊ ㄋㄟˇ 。

ㄋㄨˇ ㄌㄧˋ ㄒㄧㄤˋ ㄑㄧㄢˊ ， ㄍㄥ ㄎㄨㄞˋ ㄍㄥ ㄩㄢˇ ， ㄠˋ ㄌㄧㄣˊ ㄆㄧˇ ㄎㄜˋ ㄩㄥˇ ㄍㄨㄤ ㄏㄨㄟ 。

ㄋㄨˇ ㄌㄧˋ ㄒㄧㄤˋ ㄑㄧㄢˊ ， ㄍㄥ ㄎㄨㄞˋ ㄍㄥ ㄑㄧㄤˊ ， ㄠˋ ㄌㄧㄣˊ ㄆㄧˇ ㄎㄜˋ ㄩㄥˇ ㄍㄨㄤ ㄏㄨㄟ 。

Hanyu Pinyin
Àolínpǐkè, àolínpǐkè, wú fēn zōngjiào, bùlùn zhǒngzú.

Wèi cùjìn yǒuyì, wèi shìjiè hépíng, wǔzhōu qīngnián, jùhuì àoyùn.

Gōngpíng jìngsài, chuàngzào xīn jìlù, déshèng wù jiāo, shībài yì wú něi.

Nǔlì xiàng qián, gèng kuài gèng yuǎn, àolínpǐkè yǒng guānghuī.

Nǔlì xiàng qián, gèng kuài gèng qiáng, àolínpǐkè yǒng guānghuī.

Official English translation from the Lausanne Agreement

Olympic! Olympic!
Regardless of religion and race
To promote good followship and world peace
Youths from the five continents gather at the Olympic Games
In fair competition, create new records
Don’t be proud when you win
Don’t be discouraged when you loss
Strive to go forward
Faster and further
The glory of Olympic will last forever!
Strive to go forward-
Higher and stronger
The glory of Olympic will last forever!

== See also ==
- Chinese Taipei
- Flag of the Republic of China
- National Anthem of the Republic of China
