= Cheng Maoyun =

Chinese composer

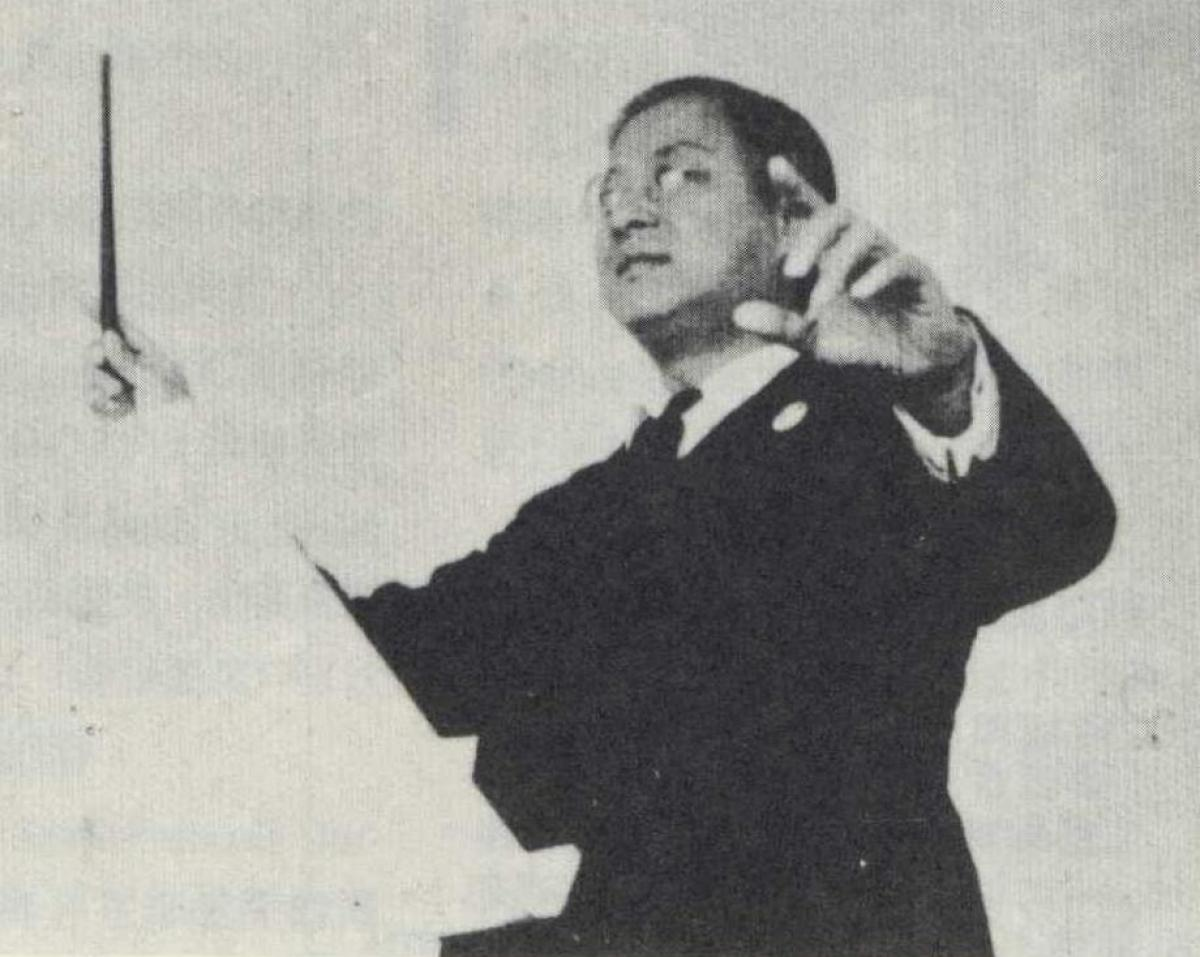
Cheng Maoyun composing

Cheng Maoyun (Chinese: 程懋筠; pinyin: Chéng Màoyún; Wade–Giles: Ch'eng Mao-yün; 25 August 1900 – 31 July 1957) was a Chinese composer and a professor at National Central University and Hangzhou Societal University (杭州社會大學). He composed the National Anthem of the Republic of China.

== Early life and education ==
He was born in Xinjian (新建), Jiangxi to a family of officials. He studied music in Jiangxi Provincial Higher Normal School (江西省立高等师范学校 Jiāngxī shěnglì gāoděng shīfàn xuéxiào), and the Ueno Music Academy (上野音樂學院) in Tokyo. He majored in violin, then music theory, and composition.

== Career ==
In 1928, his submission of the melody of "Three Principles of the People" was chosen. In 1947, he travelled to Taiwan for the first time, where Hsiao Er-hua (蕭而化 Xiāo Érhuà), head of the College of Music in the Taiwan Provincial Normal University, offered Cheng Maoyun a position, but he refused. He never returned to Taiwan again. He had a stroke in 1951 in Xi'an, and he died of a second stroke on July 31, 1957.

The official university song of the National Central University is also composed by Cheng.

== Personal life ==
His wife and son are also musicians. Zhang Yongzhen (张咏真), Cheng's wife, is a piano professor at the Xi'an Music Academy. His son, Zhang Jiannan (张坚男; born 1945), is a composer.

== See also ==
- Music of China
- List of Chinese composers
