= Chinese Taipei at the AFC Asian Cup =

National football delegation

Chinese Taipei national football team or Taiwan has participated in two AFC Asian Cup since it was founded.

During their participation, the team was known as Republic of China due to that time, they were recognized as the only real China, since the People's Republic of China was not a member of FIFA or AFC until 1978. Being one of Asia's most powerful teams back to 1960s, they had won third place in 1960 edition, and it was their best performance in the history of their participancy. Since 1968, Chinese Taipei had not qualified to the AFC Asian Cup.

== 1960 Asian Cup ==
All times are Korea Standard Time (UTC+9)

| Team | Pld | W | D | L | GF | GA | GD | Pts |
|---|---|---|---|---|---|---|---|---|
| South Korea | 3 | 3 | 0 | 0 | 9 | 1 | +8 | 6 |
| Israel | 3 | 2 | 0 | 1 | 6 | 4 | +2 | 4 |
| Republic of China | 3 | 1 | 0 | 2 | 2 | 2 | 0 | 2 |
| South Vietnam | 3 | 0 | 0 | 3 | 2 | 12 | −10 | 0 |

17 October 1960

| Republic of China | 2 – 0 | South Vietnam |
|---|---|---|
| | Report |

Hyochang Stadium, Seoul

21 October 1960
15:00

| South Korea | 1 – 0 | Republic of China |
|---|---|---|
| Moon Jung-Sik 54' | Report |

Hyochang Stadium, Seoul

23 October 1960

| Israel | 1 – 0 | Republic of China |
|---|---|---|
| S. Levi 72' | Report |

Hyochang Stadium, Seoul
Attendance: 25,000
Referee: Yozo Yokoyama (Japan)

== 1968 Asian Cup ==
| Team | Pld | W | D | L | GF | GA | GD | Pts |
|---|---|---|---|---|---|---|---|---|
| Iran | 4 | 4 | 0 | 0 | 11 | 2 | +9 | 8 |
| Burma | 4 | 2 | 1 | 1 | 5 | 4 | +1 | 5 |
| Israel | 4 | 2 | 0 | 2 | 11 | 5 | +6 | 4 |
| Republic of China | 4 | 0 | 2 | 2 | 3 | 10 | −7 | 2 |
| Hong Kong | 4 | 0 | 1 | 3 | 2 | 11 | −9 | 1 |

11 May 1968

| Republic of China | 1–1 | Burma |
|---|---|---|
| Lim Lu-shoor 63' | | Maung Hla Htay 13' |

Amjadieh Stadium, Tehran

13 May 1968

| Iran | 4–0 | Republic of China |
|---|---|---|
| Behzadi 31'; Kalani 34'; Eftekhari 51'; Farzami 56' |

Amjadieh Stadium, Tehran
Attendance: 30,000
Referee: Alex Joseph Vaz (India)

15 May 1968

| Hong Kong | 1–1 | Republic of China |
|---|---|---|
| Li Kwok Keung | | Lo Kwok Tai |

Amjadieh Stadium, Tehran

17 May 1968

| Israel | 4–1 | Republic of China |
|---|---|---|
| Romano 2', 60'; Rosenthal 70'; Spiegel 76' | | Li Huan-wen 45+1' |

Amjadieh Stadium, Tehran
Attendance: 20,000
Referee: Narayan Ghosh (India)

== Record ==
AFC Asian Cup record
| Year | Round | Position | Pld | W | D | L | GF | GA |
|---|---|---|---|---|---|---|---|---|
| (Hong Kong) 1956 | Did not qualify | | | | | | | |
| (South Korea) 1960 | Third place | 3rd | 3 | 1 | 0 | 2 | 2 | 2 |
| (Israel) 1964 | Did not qualify | | | | | | | |
| (Iran) 1968 | Fourth place | 4th | 4 | 0 | 2 | 2 | 3 | 10 |
| (Thailand) 1972 to (Qatar) 2023 | Did not qualify | | | | | | | |
| Total | Third place | 2/18 | 7 | 1 | 2 | 4 | 5 | 12 |
