= National Anthem of the Republic of China =

中華民國國歌
English: National Anthem of the Republic of China
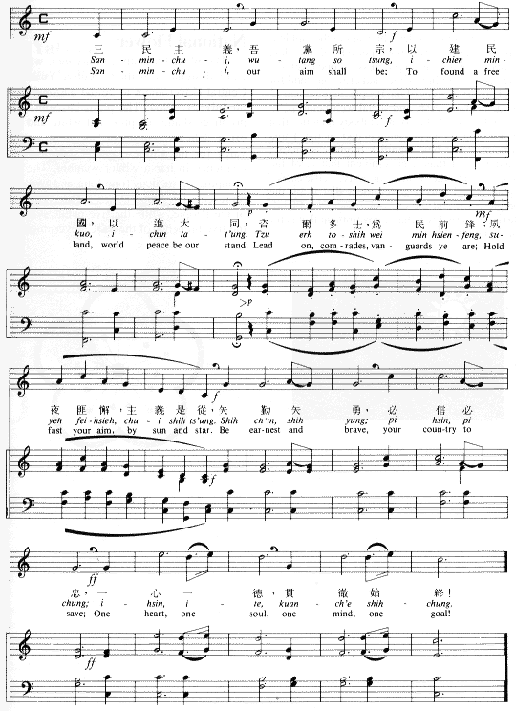
- Sheet music
- National anthem of the Republic of China Party anthem of the Kuomintang
- Lyrics: Sun Yat-sen, 1924 (Note: Adapted from a speech.)
- Music: Cheng Maoyun, 1928
- Adopted: 1930 (in Mainland China); 1945 (in Taiwan)
- Relinquished: 1949 (in Mainland China)

Audio sample
- Official instrumental rendition in E-flat major: file; help

National Anthem of the Republic of China
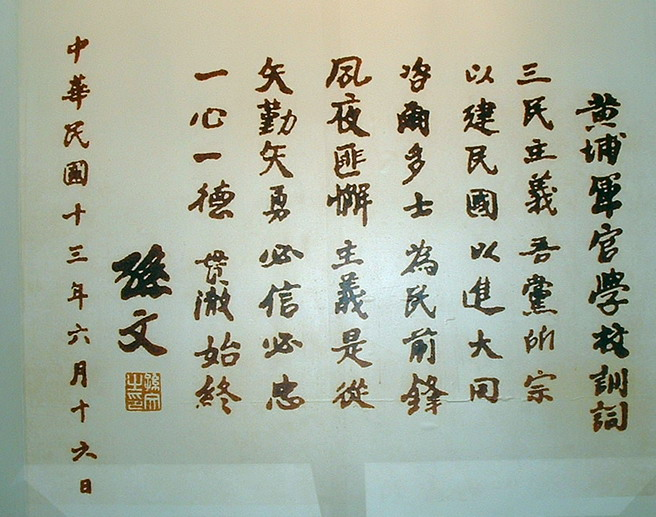
- The original Whampoa Military Academy speech in Sun's handwriting.
- Traditional Chinese: 中華民國國歌
- Simplified Chinese: 中华民国国歌
- Hanyu Pinyin: Zhōnghuá Mínguó guógē
Transcriptions
Standard Mandarin
- Hanyu Pinyin: Zhōnghuá Mínguó guógē
- Bopomofo: ㄓㄨㄥ ㄏㄨㄚˊ ㄇㄧㄣˊ ㄍㄨㄛˊ ㄍㄨㄛˊ ㄍㄜ
- Wade–Giles: Chung^{1}-hua^{2} Min^{2}-kuo^{2} kuo^{2}-ko^{1}
- Tongyong Pinyin: Jhong-huá Mín-guó guó-ge
- Yale Romanization: Jūnghwá Mín'gwó gwógē
- IPA: [ʈʂʊ́ŋ.xwǎ mǐn.kwǒ kwǒ.kɤ́]
other Mandarin
- Xiao'erjing: ﺟْﻮ ﺧُﻮَ مٍ ﻗُﻮَع ﻗُﻮَع قْ
Hakka
- Pha̍k-fa-sṳ: Chûng-fà Mìn-koet koet-kô
Yue: Cantonese
- Yale Romanization: Jūng'wà Màn'gwok Gwokgō
- Jyutping: zung1 waa4 man4 gwok3 gwok3 go1
- IPA: [tsʊŋ˥ wa˩ mɐn˩ kʷɔk̚˧ kʷɔk̚˧ kɔ˥]
Southern Min
- Hokkien POJ: Tiong-hôa-bîn-kok Kok-koa

Three Principles of the People
- Traditional Chinese: 三民主義歌
- Simplified Chinese: 三民主义歌
- Hanyu Pinyin: Sānmín Zhǔyì Gē
- Literal meaning: Song of the Three Principles of the People
Transcriptions
Standard Mandarin
- Hanyu Pinyin: Sānmín Zhǔyì Gē
- Bopomofo: ㄙㄢ ㄇㄧㄣˊ ㄓㄨˇ ㄧˋ
- Wade–Giles: San^{1}-min^{2} Chu^{3}-i^{4} Ge^{1}
- Tongyong Pinyin: San-mín Jhǔ-yì
- IPA: [sán.mǐn ʈʂù.î]
Yue: Cantonese
- Jyutping: saam1 man4 zyu2 ji6 go1
- IPA: [sam˥ mɐn˩ tsy˧˥ ji˨]
Southern Min
- Hokkien POJ: Sam-bîn Chú-gī

The "National Anthem of the Republic of China", also known by its incipit "Three Principles of the People", is the national anthem of the Republic of China, commonly called Taiwan, as well as the party anthem of the Kuomintang. It was adopted in 1930 as the national anthem, replacing the "Song to the Auspicious Cloud". It became the national anthem in Taiwan on October 25, 1945 as a consequence of Taiwan's return to Chinese rule after the surrender of Japan. Following the retreat of the government of the Republic of China to Taiwan and the establishment of the People's Republic of China, it was discontinued as a national anthem on the mainland and replaced by "March of the Volunteers" there.

The national anthem's words are adapted from a 1924 speech by Sun Yat-sen in 1927. The lyrics relate to how the vision and hopes of a new nation and its people can be achieved and maintained. Informally, the song is sometimes known as "San Min Chu-i" from its opening line, which references the Three Principles of the People (三民主義; sānmín zhǔyì; san^{1}-min^{2} chu^{3}-i^{4}), but this name is never used on formal or official occasions. During flag-raising ceremonies, the national anthem is played at the start prior to flag-raising followed by the National Flag Anthem of the Republic of China during actual flag-raising.

== History ==
The text was a collaboration between several Kuomintang (KMT) party members: Hu Hanmin, Tai Chi-tao, Liao Zhongkai, and Shao Yuanchong. The text debuted on 16 June 1924, as the opening of a speech by Sun Yat-sen at the opening ceremony of the Whampoa Military Academy. After the success of the Northern Expedition, the Kuomintang party chose the text to be its party anthem and publicly solicited for accompanying music. Cheng Maoyun won in a contest of 139 participants.

Vocal version of the National Anthem of the Republic of China, c.1942

On 24 March 1930, numerous Kuomintang party members proposed to use the speech by Sun as the lyrics to the national anthem. At the time, the national anthem of the republic was the "Song to the Auspicious Cloud". Due to opposition over using a symbol of a political party to represent the entire nation, the National Anthem Editing and Research Committee (國歌編製研究委員會) was set up, which endorsed the KMT party song. On 3 June 1937, the Central Standing Committee approved the proposal, and in the 1940s, the song formally became the official national anthem of the Republic of China. For many Taiwanese, the anthem carries a number of meanings, often conflicting. Some Taiwanese reject the anthem outright as an anachronistic symbol of the vanquished KMT dictatorship.

== Tune ==
Anthem of Republic China 1930s

Three Principle of People, by Sun Yat Sen

== Lyrics ==
Traditional Chinese
(with Bopomofo)

三(ㄙㄢ)民(ㄇㄧㄣˊ)主(ㄓㄨˇ)義(ㄧˋ)，吾(ㄨˊ)黨(ㄉㄤˇ)所(ㄙㄨㄛˇ)宗(ㄗㄨㄥ)；
以(ㄧˇ)建(ㄐㄧㄢˋ)民(ㄇㄧㄣˊ)國(ㄍㄨㄛˊ)，以(ㄧˇ)進(ㄐㄧㄣˋ)大(ㄉㄚˋ)同(ㄊㄨㄥˊ)。
咨(ㄗ)爾(ㄦˇ)多(ㄉㄨㄛ)士(ㄕˋ)，為(ㄨㄟˋ)民(ㄇㄧㄣˊ)前(ㄑㄧㄢˊ)鋒(ㄈㄥ)；
夙(ㄙㄨˋ)夜(ㄧㄝˋ)匪(ㄈㄟˇ)懈(ㄒㄧㄝˋ)，主(ㄓㄨˇ)義(ㄧˋ)是(ㄕˋ)從(ㄘㄨㄥˊ)。
矢(ㄕˇ)勤(ㄑㄧㄣˊ)矢(ㄕˇ)勇(ㄩㄥˇ)，必(ㄅㄧˋ)信(ㄒㄧㄣˋ)必(ㄅㄧˋ)忠(ㄓㄨㄥ)；
一(ㄧˋ)心(ㄒㄧㄣ)一(ㄧˋ)德(ㄉㄜˊ)，貫(ㄍㄨㄢˋ)徹(ㄔㄜˋ)始(ㄕˇ)終(ㄓㄨㄥ)。

Simplified Chinese
(with Hanyu Pinyin)

三民(Sānmín)主义(zhǔyì)，吾(wú)党(dǎng)所(suǒ)宗(zōng)；
以(Yǐ)建(jiàn)民国(Mínguó)，以(yǐ)进(jìn)大同(dàtóng)。
咨(Zī)尔(ěr)多士(duōshì)，为(wèi)民(mín)前锋(qiánfēng)；
夙夜(Sùyè)匪(fěi)懈(xiè)，主义(zhǔyì)是(shì)从(cóng)。
矢(Shǐ)勤(qín)矢(shǐ)勇(yǒng)，必(bì)信(xìn)必(bì)忠(zhōng)；
一(Yì)心(xīn)一(yì)德(dé)，贯彻(guànchè)始(shǐ)终(zhōng)。

IPA transcription (Note: See Help:IPA/Mandarin and Standard Chinese phonology.)

[sán.mǐn ʈ͡ʂù.î ǔ tàŋ swɔ̀ t͡sʊ́ŋ]
[ì t͡ɕjɛ̂n mǐn.kwɔ̌ ì t͡ɕîn tâ.tʰʊ̌ŋ]
[t͡sɹ̩́ àɚ twɔ́.ʂɻ̩̂ wɛ̂i mǐn t͡ɕʰjɛ̌n.fɤ́ŋ]
[sû.jɛ̂ fɛ̀i ɕjɛ̂ ʈ͡ʂù.î ʂɻ̩̂ t͡sʰʊ̌ŋ]
[ʂɻ̩̀ t͡ɕʰǐn ʂɻ̩̀ jʊ̀ŋ pî ɕîn pî ʈ͡ʂʊ́ŋ]
[î ɕín î tɤ̌ kwân.ʈ͡ʂʰɤ̂ ʂɻ̩̀ ʈ͡ʂʊ́ŋ]

The lyrics are in classical literary Chinese. For example:

- ěr (爾) is a literary equivalent of both singular and plural "you" (which are differentiated in modern Chinese) depending on the context. In this case, it is the plural of "you".
- fěi (匪) is a classical synonym of "not" (非 fēi).
- zī (咨) is a classical, archaic interjection, and is not used in this sense in the modern vernacular language.

In this respect, the national anthem of the Republic of China stands in contrast to the People's Republic of China's "March of the Volunteers", which was written a few years later entirely in modern vernacular Chinese.

As well as being written in classical Chinese, the national anthem follows classical poetic conventions. The ancient Fu style follows that of a four-character poem, where the last character of each line rhymes in -ong or -eng, which are equivalent.

=== English translations ===
The official translation by Theodore B. Tu appears in English-language guides to the ROC published by the government.

Official

San Min Chu-i
Our aim shall be:
To found a free land,
World peace, be our stand.
Lead on, comrades,
Vanguards ye are.
Hold fast your aim,
By sun and star.
Be earnest and brave,
Your country to save,
One heart, one soul,
One mind, one goal.

Literal

The Three Principles of the People
The foundational principle that we follow. (Note: The 吾黨 may simply mean "we/our" but it may also mean "our party".)
Using this, we establish the Republic;
Using this, we advance towards Great Unity.
Oh, you, righteous men,
For the people, be their vanguards.
Day or night, without resting,
Follow the Principles.
Swear to be diligent; swear to be courageous.
Obliged to be trustworthy; obliged to be loyal.
With one heart and one virtue,
We carry through until the very end.

=== Transcriptions in other Sinitic languages ===
Cantonese (Yale)

Sāam màhn jyú yih, ngh dóng só jūng,
Yíh gin màhn gwok, yíh jeun daaih duhng,
Jī yíh dō sih, wàih màhn chìhn fūng,
Sūk yeh féi háaih, jyú yih sih chùhng,
Chí kàhn chí yúhng, bīt seun bīt jūng,
Yāt sām yāt dāk, gun chit chí jūng!

Taiwanese Hokkien (Pe̍h-ōe-jī)

Sam bîn chú gī, ngô͘ tóng só͘ chong,
Í kiàn Bîn-kok, í chìn tāi tông,
Chu ní to sū, ûi bîn chiân hong,
Siok iā húi hāi, chú gī sī chiông,
Sí khîn sí ióng, pit sìn pit tiong,
i̍t sim i̍t tek, koàn thiat sí tiong!

== Notes ==
Preceded by Song to the Auspicious Cloud (1913–1928)	National anthem of China; 1930–1949	Succeeded by March of the Volunteers (1949–present)
Preceded by Kimigayo (1895–1945)	National anthem of Taiwan; 1945–present	Incumbent
