= Mausoleum of Shaohao =

Historic site in Shandong Province, China

Coordinates: 35.610802°N 117.033°E

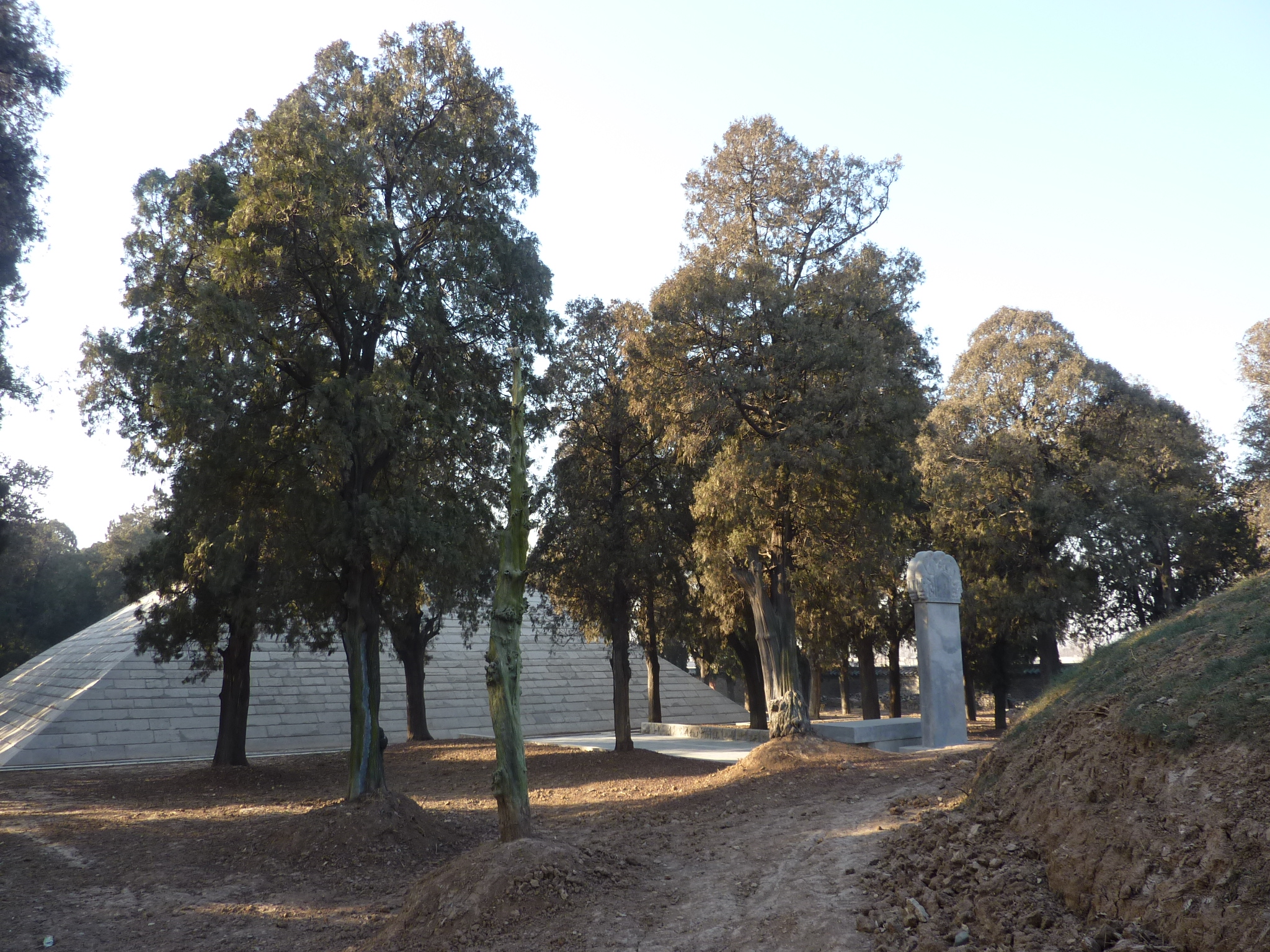
The tomb (the earthen tumulus) (right) is seen with the stele inscribed "Shao Hao Ling" ("Shaohao Tomb") between it and the Shou Qiu (the pyramid) (left).

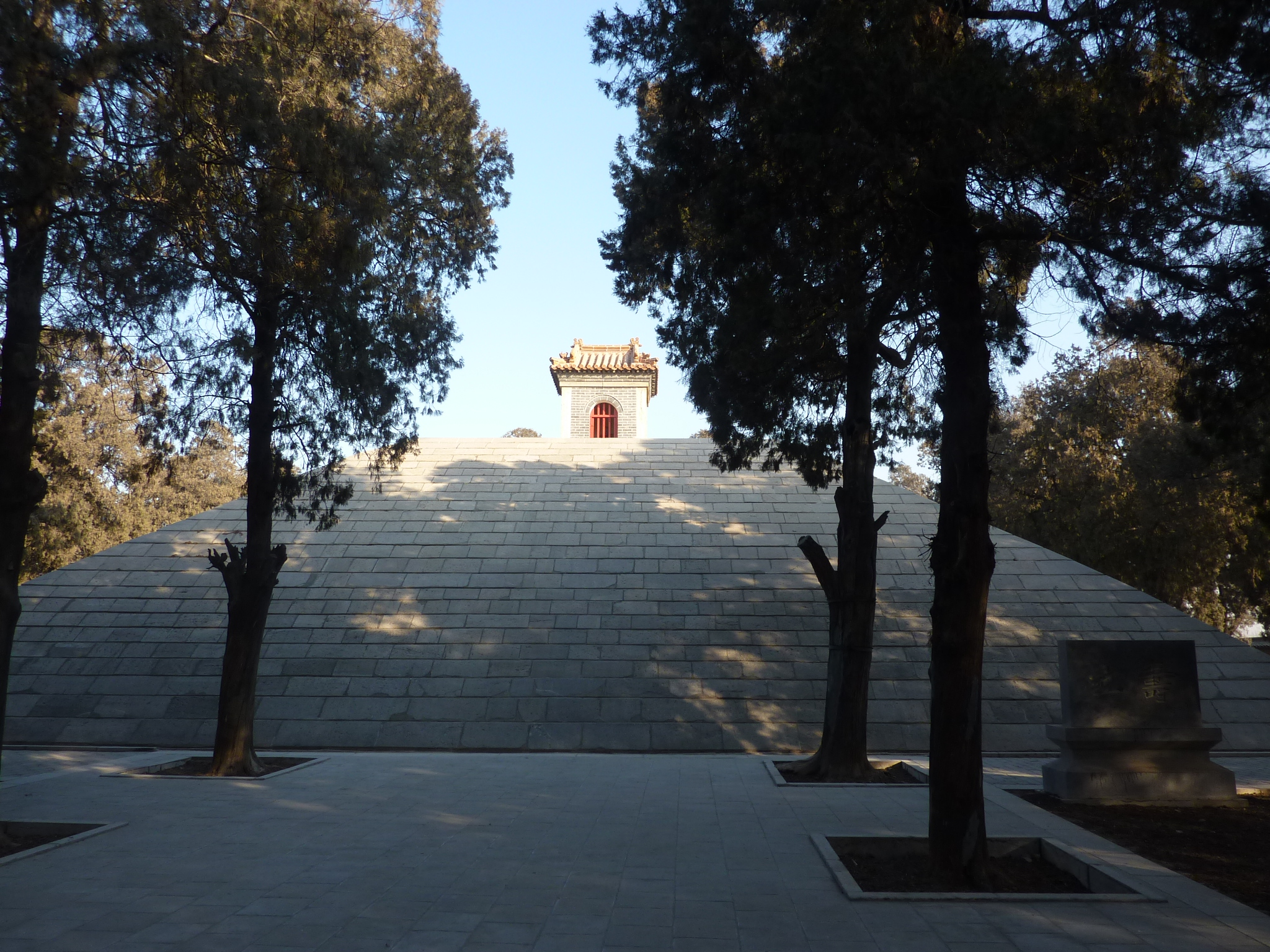
Another view on the pyramid

The Mausoleum of Shaohao (Chinese: 少昊陵; pinyin: Shǎohào Líng) is located in the north-east of Jiuxian Village, on the eastern outskirts of the city of Qufu in Shandong Province, China. The mausoleum complex honours Shaohao, the son of the first mythical Chinese ruler (the Yellow Emperor) and one of the mythical five emperors himself.

The mausoleum complex is best known for the pyramidal monument which stands in front of the tomb itself, and which is often mistaken for the tomb. Called "Shou Qiu" ("mound or hill of longevity"), this monument marks the birthplace of the Yellow Emperor according to legend. It is unique in China because of its pyramid-shaped stone construction. It consists of a mound that has been covered with stone slabs during the reign of Emperor Huizong of the Song dynasty in 1111 CE. The entire pyramid is 28.5 metres wide and 8.73 meters high. On its flat top stands a small pavilion that houses a statue, variously identified as the Yellow Emperor or Shaohao. The mound and tomb stands inside a compound with many old trees, chiefly thujas planted on the orders of the Qianlong Emperor of the Qing dynasty, who visited the site in 1748.

The rather unusual design of this monument has long attracted visitors' notice. As Rev. A. Williamson, who visited the site in 1865, wrote:

The pyramid was not at all to be compared to the Egyptian ones for size, but of the same shape, and instantly reminded one of them. Anywhere but in China would we look for such structures. But this is another indication of the antiquity of the Chinese, and the oneness of the human race.

The tomb proper is only a few metres behind Shou Qiu. Shou Qiu was originally separate from Shaohao's tomb, but after the 12th century renovation of the tomb became part of the same complex that also included a shrine dedicated to the Yellow Emperor, and other buildings. When the tomb was renovated in 1738, the remainder of the complex had long disappeared, so a sacrificial hall was built for Shaohao (as was traditional for large tombs). As a site of mythological significance itself, Shou Qiu had to be preserved, so the sacrificial hall was built in front of Shou Qiu, and the pyramid was enclosed into the complex. The tomb itself is the large earthen tumulus behind the pyramidal monument.

Although there are no records of the excavation of the tomb itself, in 1978 excavations of the grounds of the enclosure uncovered various artefacts identified as Neolithic stone axes and shovels, and ceramics.

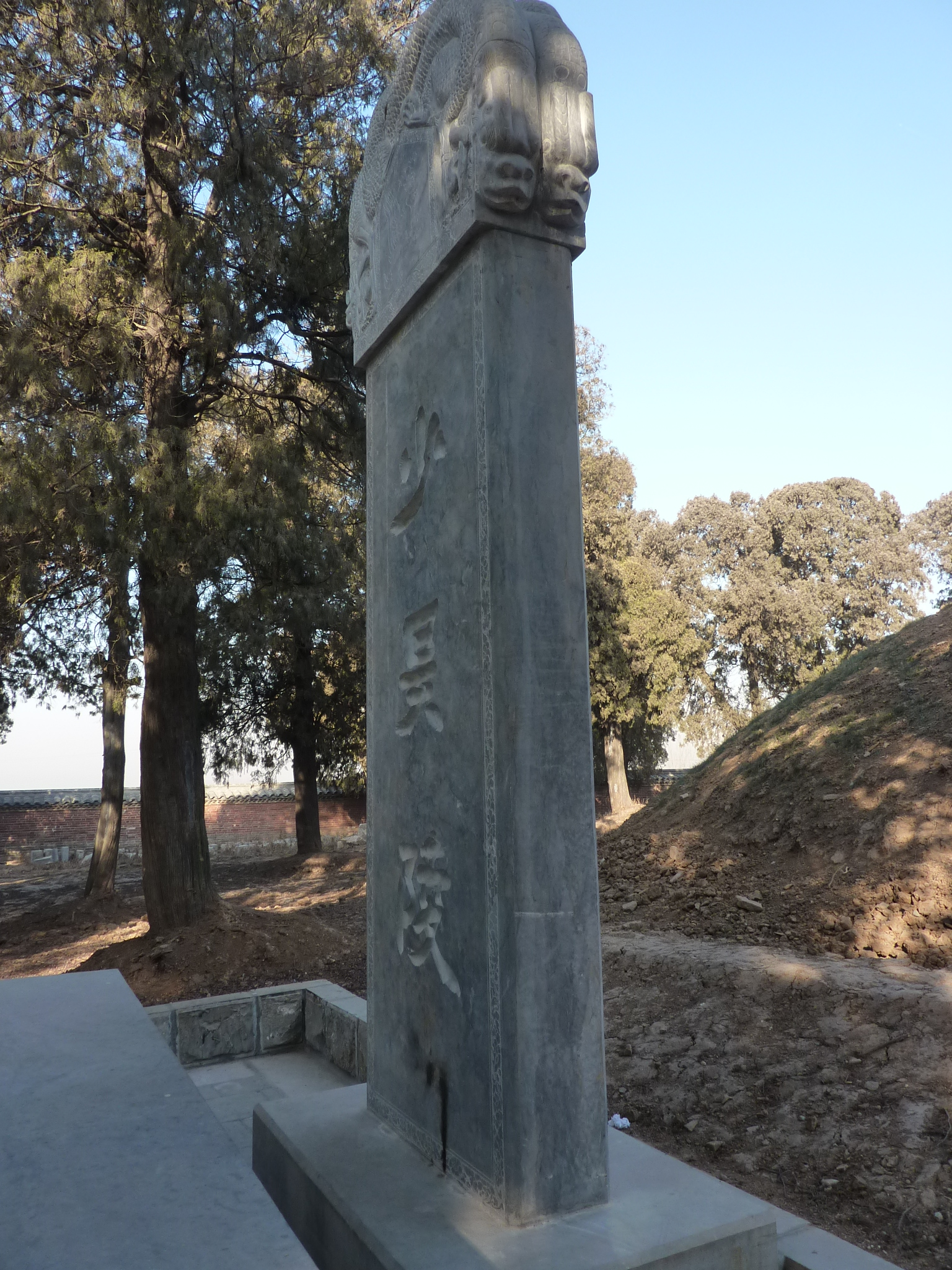
Stele

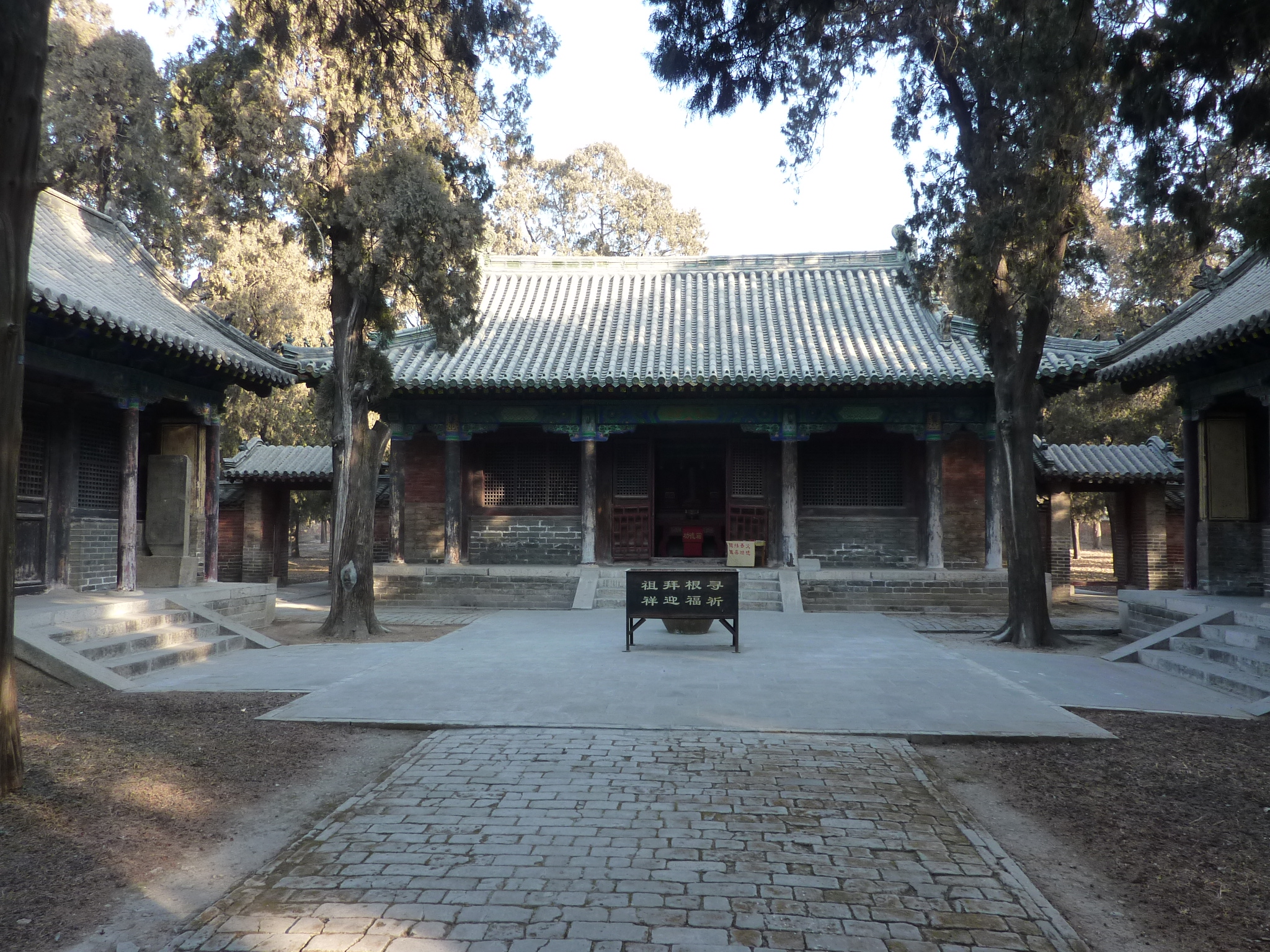
Courtyard

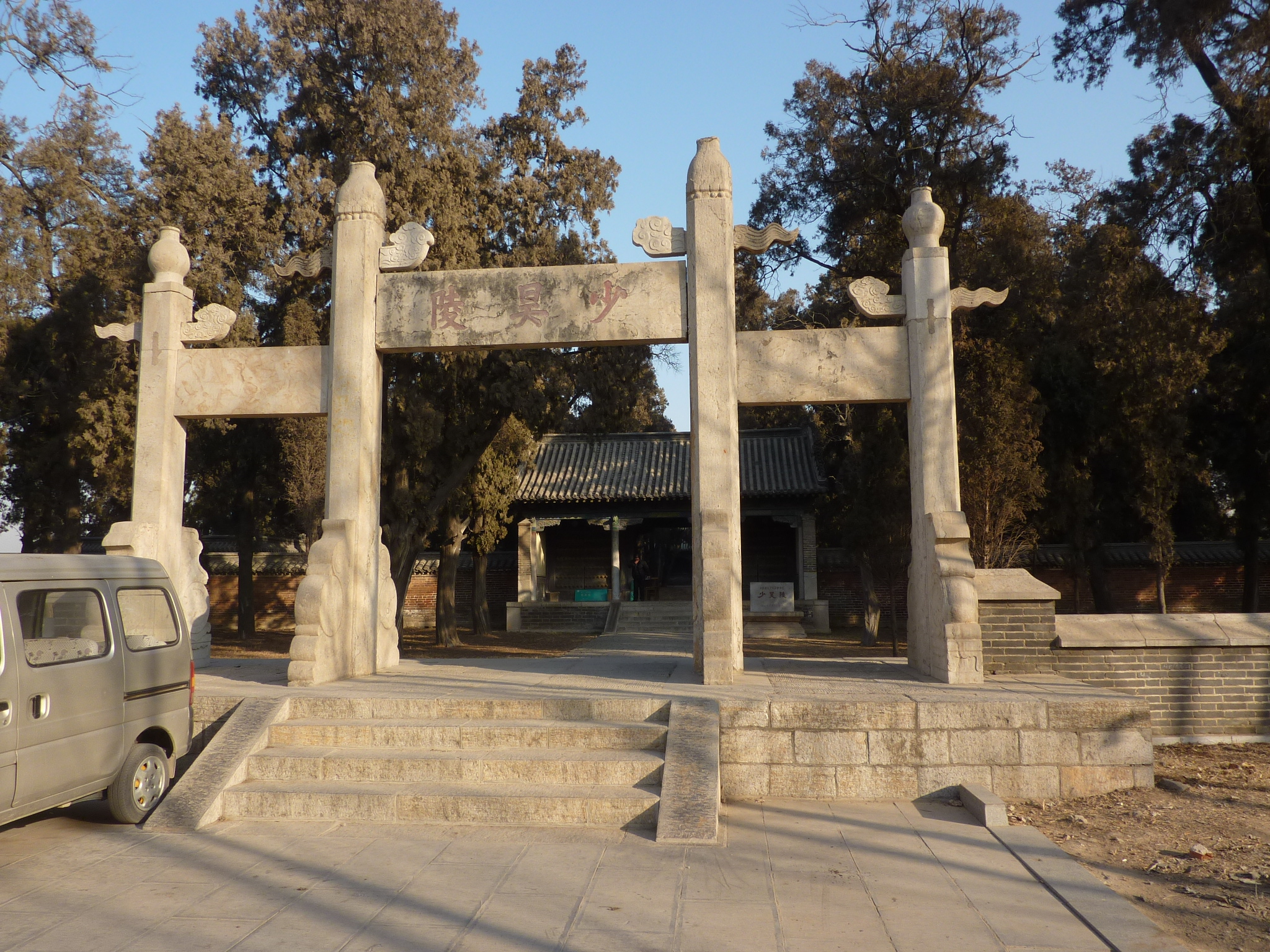
Gates of the tomb

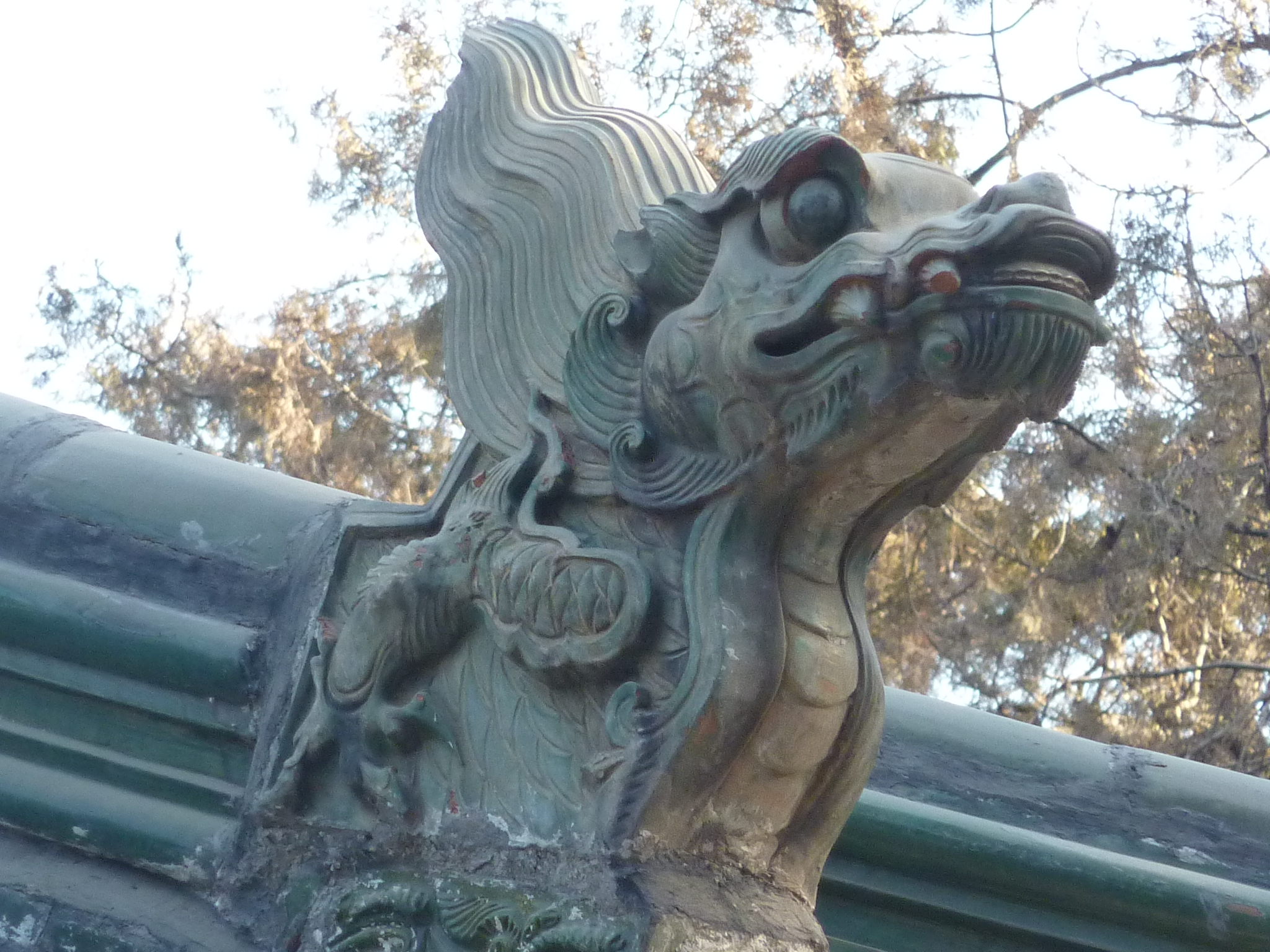
Gable figure

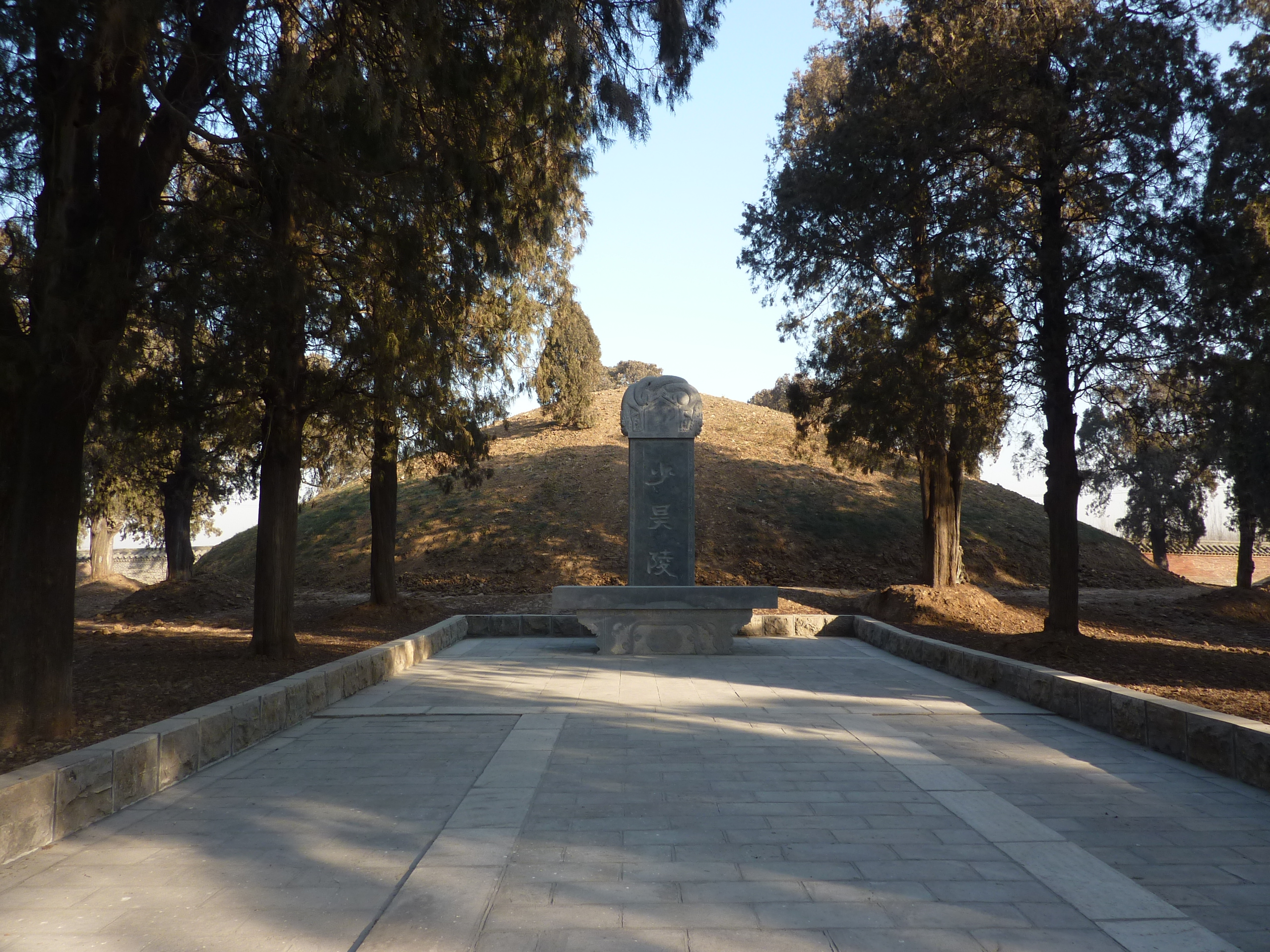
Front-on view of tomb and stele, from the back of Shou Qiu
