= Shou Qiu =

Historical site in Shandong Province, China

Coordinates: 35°36′18″N 117°1′55″E

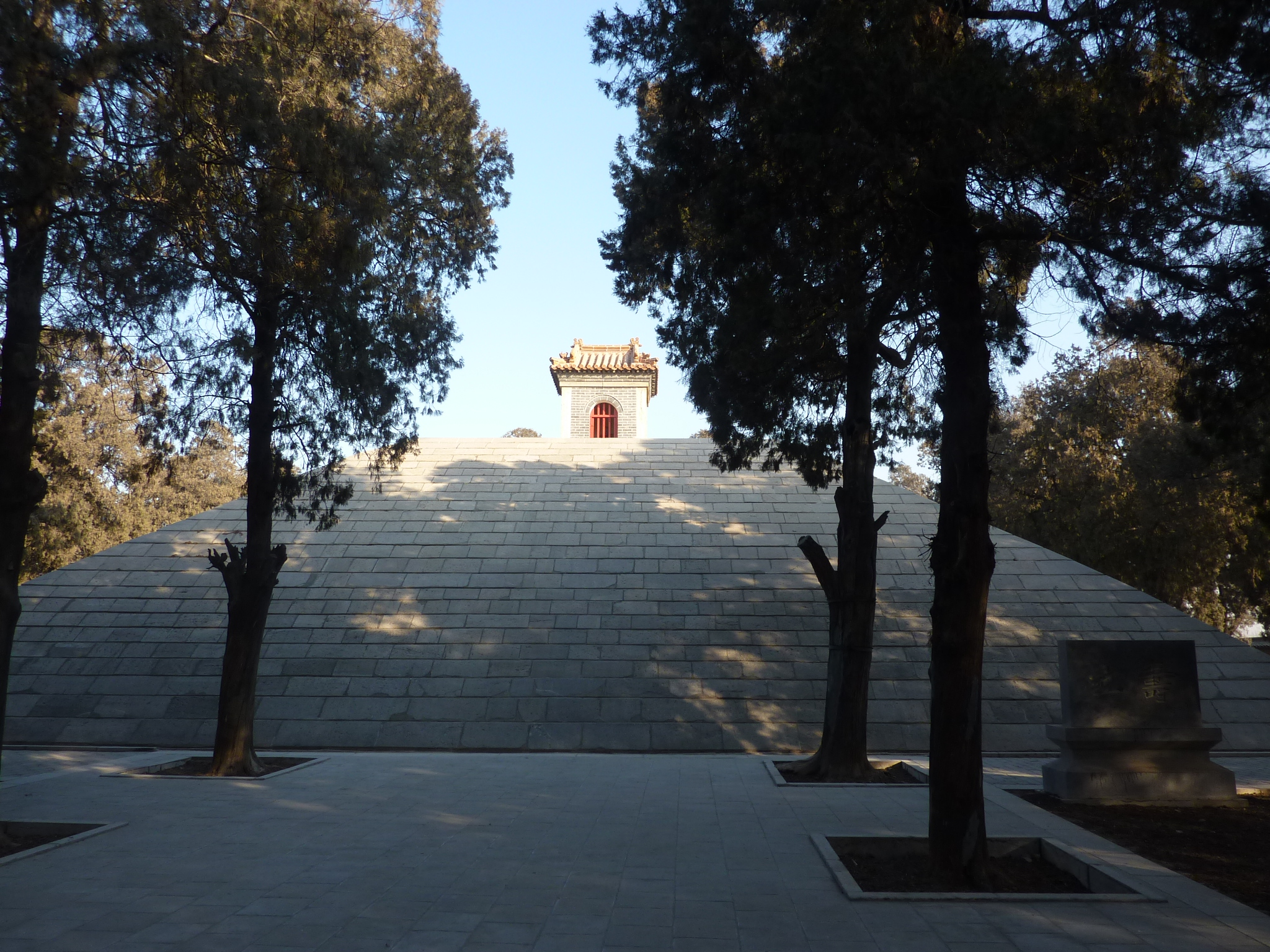
Shou Qiu pyramid, front-on view.

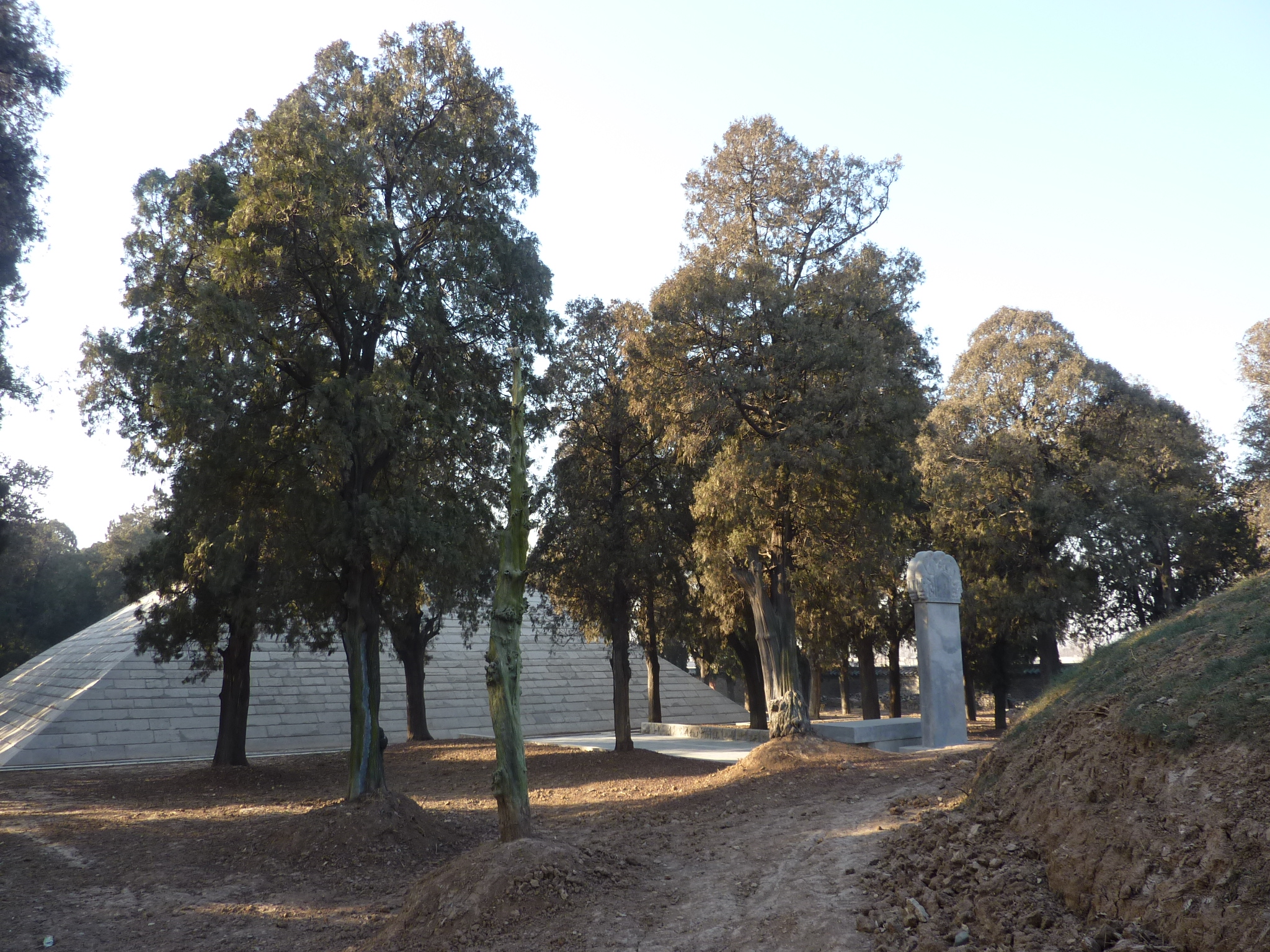
Shou Qiu mound itself (left), with the tomb stele and Shaohao's tumulus tomb (right) behind it.

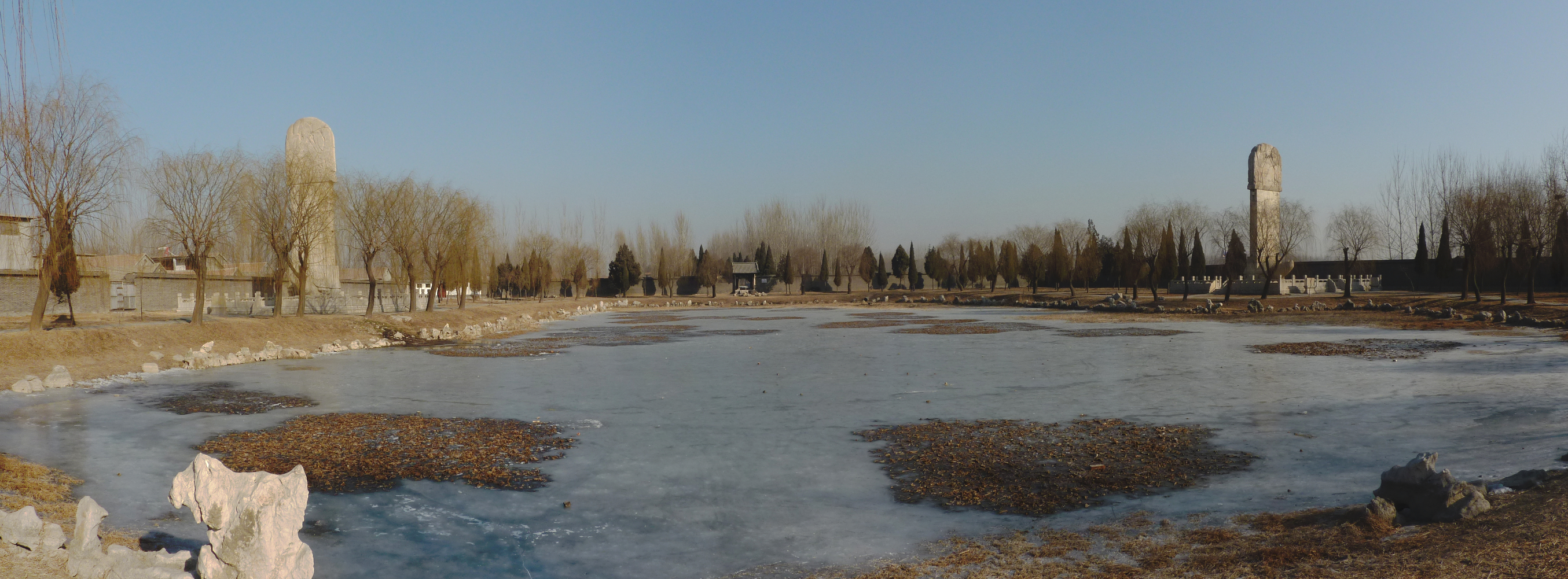
A panorama of the site of the former temple attached to Shou Qiu, seen from the south. The western stele (Qing Shou Bei) on the left, the eastern stele (Wan Ren Chou Bei) on the right.

Shou Qiu (Chinese: 寿丘; pinyin: Shòu Qiū; lit. 'Longevity Hill') is a historical site on the eastern outskirts of the city of Qufu in Shandong Province, China. According to the legend, Shou Qiu is the birthplace of the Yellow Emperor.

Shou Qiu itself is today marked only by a pyramidal monument, covered in stone in the 12th century, that represents the legendary hill itself. It is now part of the same complex as the tomb of Shaohao, the son of the Yellow Emperor. Because Shaohao's tomb stands very closely behind the pyramidal monument, the pyramid is often mistaken as the tomb itself.

Shou Qiu was encased in stone in the 12th century, resulting in a step pyramid. At its top is a small pavilion. The structure seen today dates from the Qianlong era. The pavilion contains a small statue, the identity of which is now uncertain; since the Qing dynasty reorganisation of the enclosure, the statue has been identified as one of Shaohao.

In the 11th century, a large complex was built around the pyramid, including governmental buildings and a shrine to the Yellow Emperor himself. The reigning Song dynasty emperors at the time venerated the Yellow Emperor as their ancestor, so the shrine was intended to feature two giant turtle-borne steles that were much larger than was usual for temples.

Today, the two stele are all that remain of the original complex. They now stand near the Shou Qiu monument with a small lake between them. The western stele is known as the "Qing Shou" Stele (Chinese: 庆寿碑; pinyin: Qìng Shòu Bēi; lit. 'Celebrate Longevity Stele'); the eastern stele as the "Wan Ren Chou" Stele (Chinese: 万人愁碑; pinyin: Wàn Rén Chóu Bēi; lit. 'Sorrow of Ten Thousand Stele'), supposedly because it took so many people to move it. The former shrine to the Yellow Emperor on the site was built in 1012 CE, during the Xuanhe era of the Huizong Emperor of the Song dynasty. The steles were also carved on site during the time, but were left lying on the ground unfinished, because the Song dynasty lost control of the area to the invading Jurchens in the Jin–Song wars.

After suffering further damage during the Cultural Revolution, the steles were restored in 1992. Missing fragments that could not be located had to be replaced; some say that this resulted in some changes of the giant tortoises' appearance: according to one local guide, "the older claws were sharper and showed more strength. The newer replicas are flabby and lack character."

With more than 16 metres (52 ft) in height, the steles are among the tallest in China. The "Wan Ren Chou" Stele, which (including the turtle base and the dragon crown) is 16.95 m tall, 3.75 m wide, 1.14 m thick, and weighs 250 tons, is often said to be the largest blank stele in China.

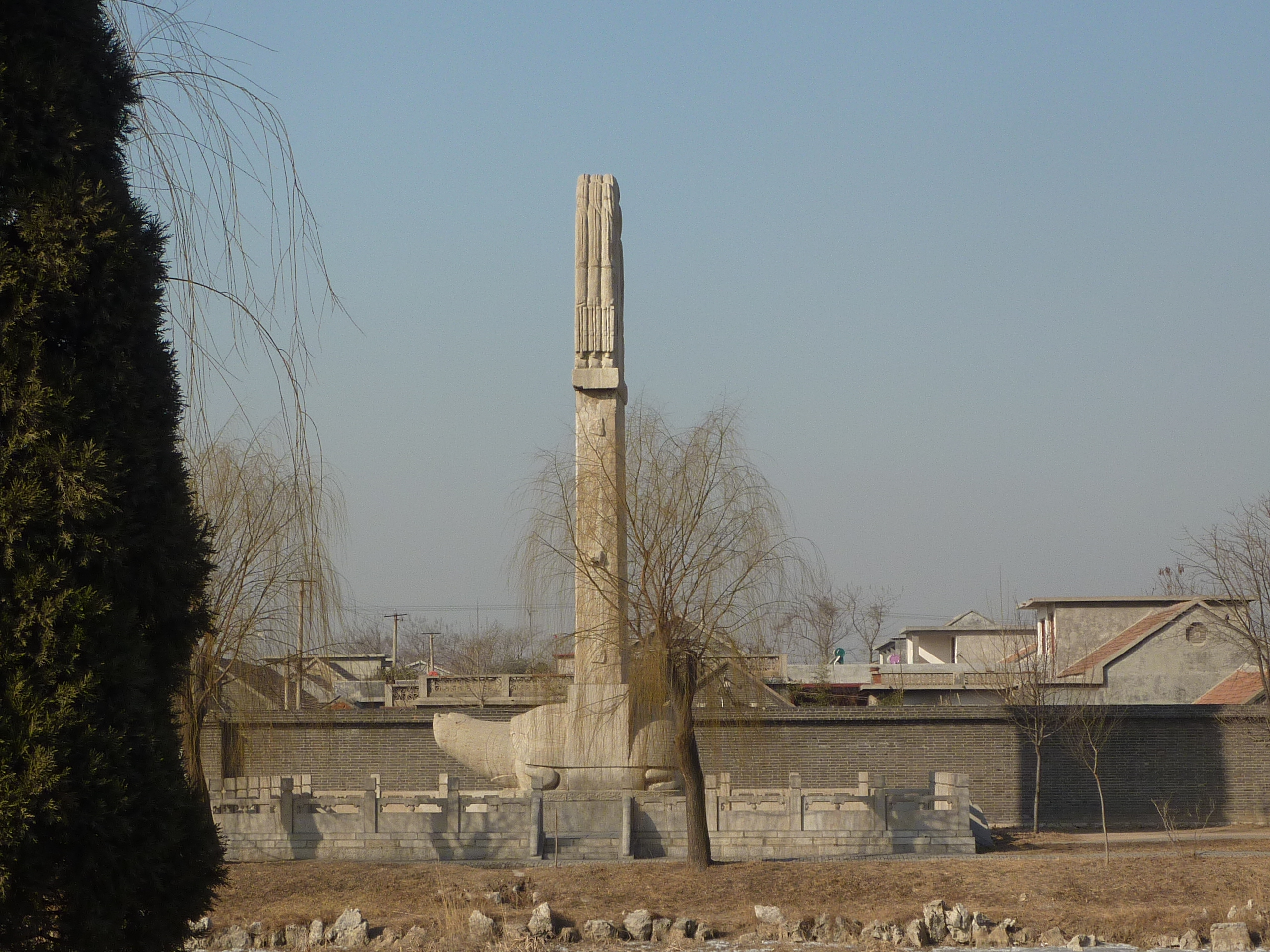
The Qing Shou Stele

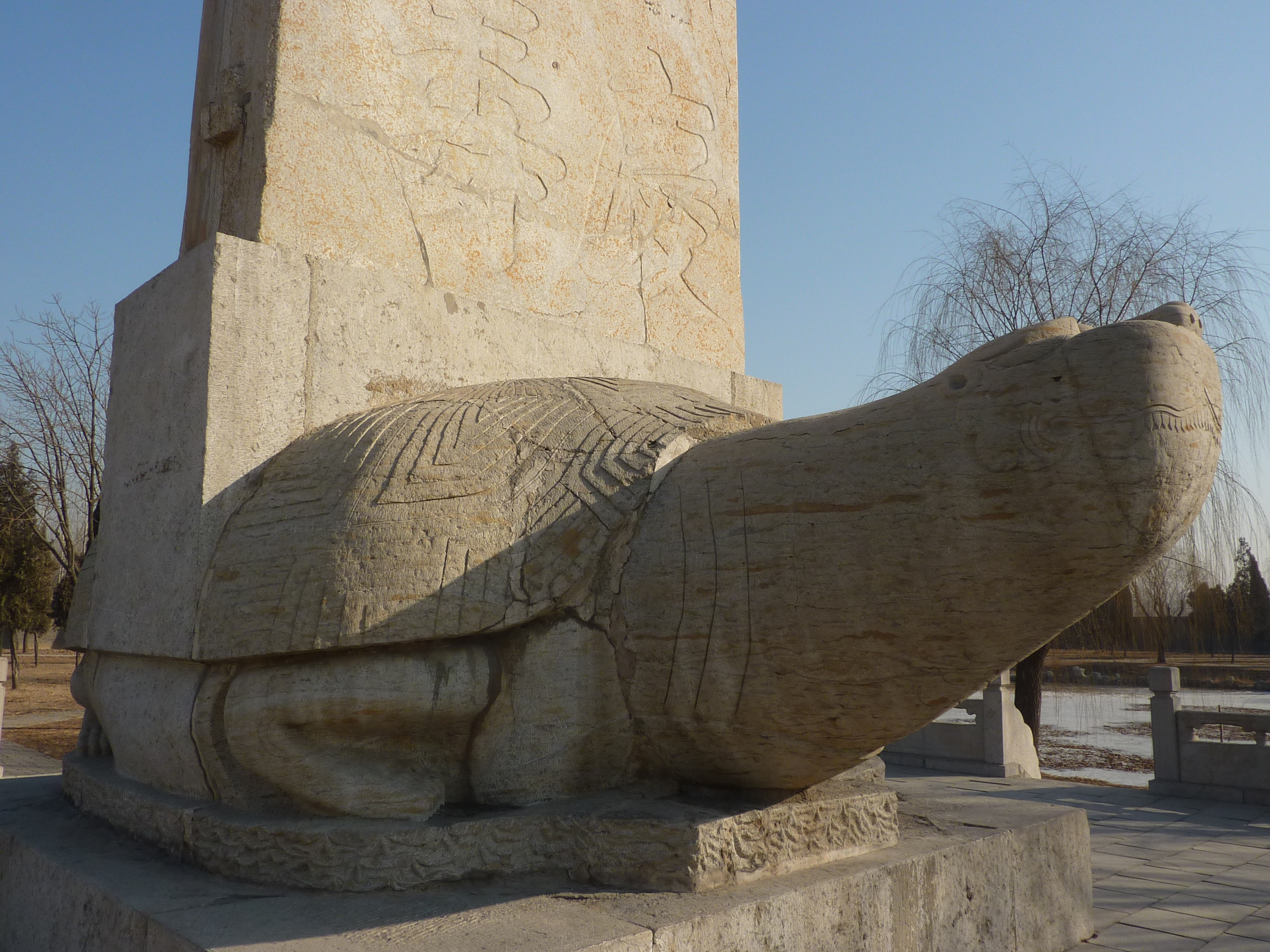
The Qing Shou Stele, close-up

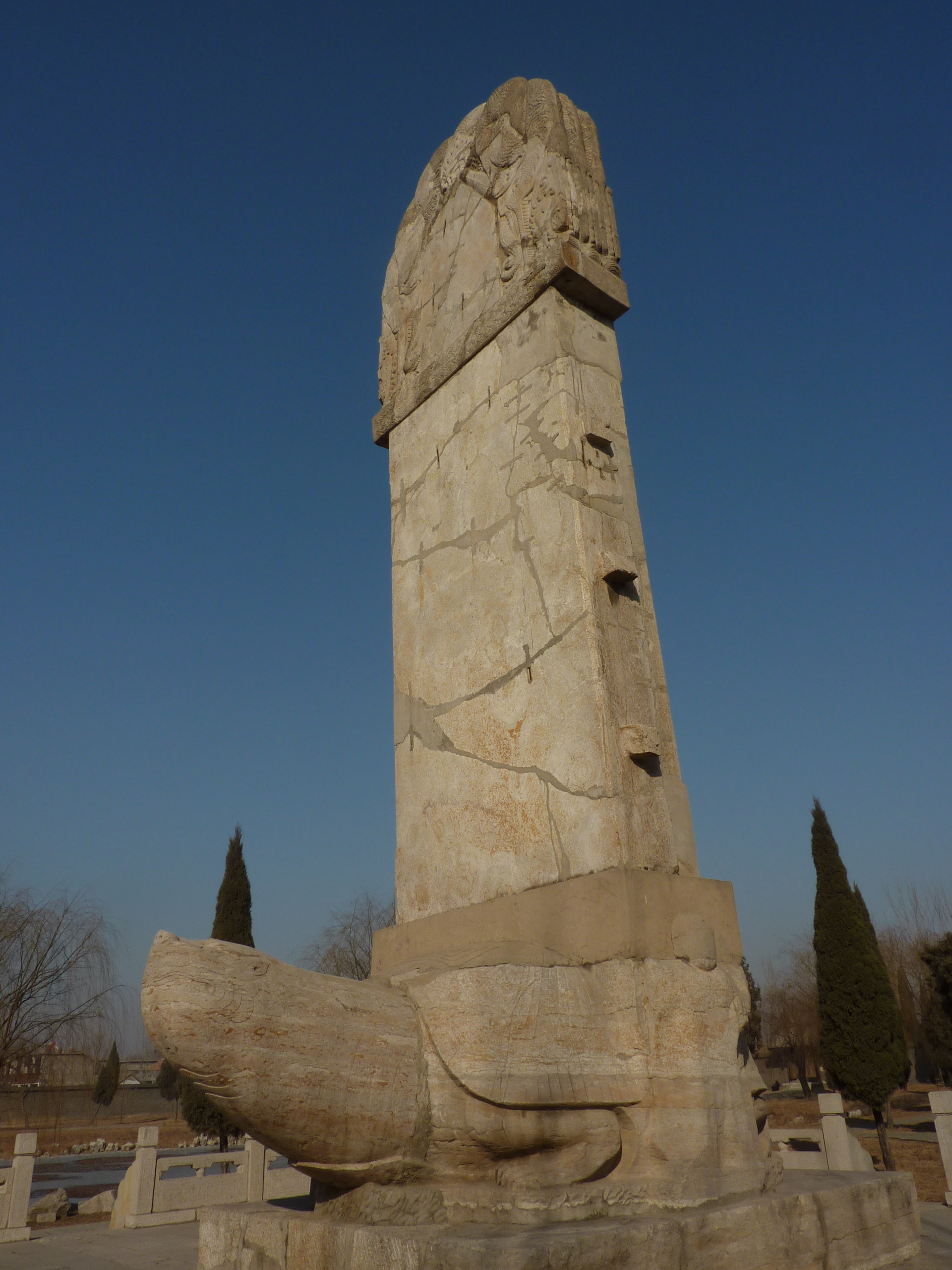
The Wan Ren Chou Stele

== See also ==
- Shaohao Tomb, nearby site (just 100 m to the north of the stele), traditionally believed to be the burial site of the Yellow Emperor's son, and which encloses the Shou Qiu monument itself
- Mausoleum of the Yellow Emperor, in Yan'an, Shaanxi
- Han Family Tombs (韩氏家族墓地), a monumental complex at the graves of the Tang-era jiedushi Han Yunzhong and his relatives, in Shandong's Shen County. It is centered around a pair of giant tortoise-borne stelae fairly similar to those at Shou Qiu.
