= Hong Kong Military Service Corps =

Hong Kong Military Service Corps 香港軍事服務團
- Active: Hong Kong Chinese Regiment (1941); Hong Kong Chinese Training Unit (HKCTU) (1948 – January 1962); Hong Kong Military Service Corps (HKMSC) (1962 – 14 December 1996)
- Country: United Kingdom; British Hong Kong
- Branch: British Army
- Type: Infantry
- Role: Territorial Defence; Logistics Support
- Size: 1800 men
- Part of: British Forces Overseas Hong Kong
- Nicknames: Buffalo (Traditional Chinese: 水牛); Water mine and coastal artillery soldiers (Traditional Chinese: 水雷炮兵)
- March: Lion Rock (Quick March)

Commanders
- Current commander: Commandant HKMSC
- Honorary Brigadier: Brigadier 48 Brigade DCBF Hong Kong

The Hong Kong Military Service Corps (HKMSC) (Traditional Chinese: 香港軍事服務團) was a British army unit and part of the British garrison in Hong Kong (see British Forces Overseas Hong Kong). Throughout the history of Hong Kong, it has been the only regular British army unit raised in the territory made up almost entirely of Locally Enlisted Personnel (LEP).

== Overview ==
=== History ===
The history of Hong Kong ethnic Chinese soldiers serving in the British Army can be traced back to the 1880s when Hong Kong locals were employed by the Royal Engineers in the building of barracks and defence works.

Many ethnic Chinese from Hong Kong fought alongside the British troops in the defence of Hong Kong in World War II. The British Battle Group consisted of 1st Battalion Middlesex Regiment, 2nd Battalion Royal Scots and the Hong Kong Chinese Regiment. Other Battle Groups were Royal Artillery, Canadian Battalions, Indian Forces and the Hong Kong Volunteer Defence Force. A large number of ethnic Hong Kong Chinese were killed or became prisoners of war.

Ethnic Hong Kong Chinese also saw active service outside Hong Kong in Burma in 1942 against the Japanese forces, where they fought alongside the 1st Battalion Gloucestershire Regiment.

In January 1948, the Hong Kong Chinese Training Unit (HKCTU) was formed by the Hong Kong ethnic Chinese who had served in the various artillery and coastal defence units during the Battle of Hong Kong in World War II, with the aim of recruiting and training Hong Kong ethnic Chinese soldiers to assist and support the British Garrison in Hong Kong. Hong Kong-born ethnic Chinese soldiers (British Dependent Territories Citizens) of the HKCTU pledged allegiance to the Monarch of the United Kingdom and were enlisted into the General Service Corps (GSC) of the British Regular Army and they wore the GSC capbadge. Members of the HKCTU were later frequently nicknamed, locally, in Cantonese Chinese, as sui lui pao bing (Chinese: 水雷炮兵; lit. 'water mine and coastal artillery soldiers') or sui ngau (Chinese: 水牛; lit. 'buffalo') in memory of their predecessors. Those enlisted before World War II were numbered HK1802xxx; those who joined after World War II, HK1826XXXX and HK1827xxxx.

In 1962, the HKCTU became the Hong Kong Military Service Corps (HKMSC) and consequently the GSC capbadge was replaced by a Dragon emblem. Initially the Dragon insignia, which was a Division Sign, had represented the Hong Kong Garrison and all British army soldiers serving in Hong Kong wore a Dragon cloth-badge on their uniform. The Dragon logo was officially adopted by the HKMSC as their Corps Badge and Corps Flag. The HKMSC became a part of the General Service Corps of the British Army.

=== British Army careers ===
The HKMSC offered locally recruited and trained Hong Kong Chinese soldiers the opportunity to pursue a full career in the British Regular Army up to and including Queen's Commissioned Officer rank in the General List (HKMSC). As all members of the HKMSC were British Regular Army soldiers, they received a Regular Army Service Record Book when they left the army. Many of them were also awarded the Long Service and Good Conduct Medal (LS&GC) after 15 years of good and loyal service. British gallantry awards, membership of orders of chivalry, decorations and medals were also presented /granted to some HKMSC soldiers; these include the Queen's Gallantry Medal (QGM), the British Empire Medal (BEM), Member of the Most Excellent Order of the British Empire (MBE) status and Officer of the Most Excellent Order of the British Empire (OBE) status.

HKMSC soldiers paid United Kingdom income tax (at a 'Hong Kong' rate), via the MoD, like their British counterparts.

The unit's Headquarters and Training Depot were originally located in Lyemun Barracks in 1948, between Shau Kei Wan and Chai Wan. It then moved to the Stonecutters Island in 1985. The HQ and Depot was commanded by a British Lieutenant Colonel, as Commandant, with a British Depot Adjutant and a Hong Kong Chinese Corps Adjutant (both Majors), a British Depot Regimental Sergeant Major (RSM) and a Hong Kong Chinese Corps RSM (both WO1s) and a British Regimental Quartermaster Sergeant (RQMS) and Superintendent Clerk (ORQMS), (both WO2s). Recruitment, selection and training was carried out by Training Company, commanded by a British Army Major, adopting the British Regular Army Recruit Training Syllabus. The HKMSC recruit training instructors were all initially trained in Hong Kong by the KHMSC, then in the UK. Training Company were also responsible for training the Ammunition Sub-Depot guards, made up of Hong Kong Sikhs (recruited as their religion barred them from smoking). The Deputy Commander British Forces (a Brigadier), was the Brigadier HKMSC (a largely honorary title).

=== Military life ===
The Hong Kong Military Service Corps maintained its reputation for loyalty and military skills at the highest level, often outshining British and Gurkha troops based in Hong Kong. The HKMSC Shooting Team won the Team and Individual champion pistol shot a number of times at RASAAM (the Regular Army Skill at Arms Meeting) at Bisley, in the UK, and in 1992 a Training Company team representing the HQ and Depot HKMSC won the Dragon Cup for military skills (outperforming the Queen's Gurkha Signals in signalling and the British Military Hospital team in first aid); the competition was not held again.

The HKMSC reached a peak strength of 1,200 men, providing the British garrison in Hong Kong with support personnel. All HKMSC soldiers did their basic training in Hong Kong and afterwards from time to time attended upgrading and trade courses in the United Kingdom. HKMSC soldiers who were posted to and served with other non-HKMSC units wore the other units' cap badges.

Unit personnel were enlisted as light-infantry, Regimental Police, interpreters and clerks in Dragon Company of the General Service Corps (GSC) headquartered in Osborn Barracks, Kowloon Tong; officers and drivers in 29 Squadron, Royal Corps of Transport (RCT) based in Gun Club Hill Barracks; crews for 415 Maritime Troop based on Stonecutters' Island; dog handlers in the Defence Animal Support Unit (DASU) of the Royal Army Veterinary Corps (RAVC) based in Sek Kong; officer instructors in the Royal Army Educational Corps (RAEC); officers and clerks in the Royal Army Pay Corps (RAPC); technicians in the Royal Signals (R Sigs) of the Queen's Gurkha Signals (QGS) and engineers and armourers in the Royal Electrical and Mechanical Engineers (REME).

HKMSC trained physical training instructors (PTI) also served in the Army Physical Training Corps (APTC), as medics in the Royal Army Medical Corps (RAMC) based in the British Military Hospital (BMH), military police in the Royal Military Police (RMP), helicopter support crews in No. 660 Squadron AAC, Army Air Corps (AAC) based at Sek Kong Airfield, cooks in the Army Catering Corps (ACC), Weapons and Supplies Storekeepers in the Royal Army Ordnance Corps (RAOC) and intelligence staff in the Intelligence Corps.

=== The modern era ===
During the Gulf War and in the early 1990s, the HKMSC provided officers and soldiers, primarily drivers and ambulance crews, to the United Nations Peacekeeping Force in Cyprus (UNFICYP) on peacekeeping operations.

In 1996, the unit was disbanded prior to the transfer of Hong Kong's sovereignty to China in 1997. Just before the handover, the Hong Kong ex-servicemen Association was formed by some of the local ex-servicemen; the association has branches in the UK and Canada.

In July 2006, Britain granted full British citizenship to all Gurkha soldiers and their dependants who had served in Hong Kong. Only 159 Hong Kong servicemen were granted British citizenship under the British Nationality Selection Scheme (BNSS) on handover of Kong Kong in 1997 for their Armed Forces service based upon a 'points system of criteria'.

Some ex-Hong Kong servicemen who were resident in the United Kingdom re-enlisted in the British Army on a Military Local Service Engagement (MLSE), with the Military Provost Guard Service (MPGS), and others joined the British Territorial Army (TA).

In March 2012, Peter Vorberg and Russell Banks RMP Veterans started the Right of Abode Campaign for all former British Hong Kong military servicemen supported by Roger Ching HKMSC RMP HK veteran, Huw Matthews RMP Veteran, Jo Lee HKMSC - RMP HK Veteran, Alain Lau HKMSC - HK RAVC Veteran, Victor Ho RHKR (Volunteers) Veteran, Set Yuen RMP HKSMC - RMP HK Veteran and later in 2019 by Stella Thornton WRAC Provost RMP Veteran. In 2019 Roger Ching left the Campaign team.

In late 2012/2013, The Honorable Mr Andrew Rosindell MP (for Romford) United Kingdom (Conservative) took and led this RoA Campaign into the British parliament establishing a 'Parliamentary Support Group' in April 2013. Rosindell summoned strong support within Government over the following 10 years of parliamentary work, some 350 voices, votes for the ex-Hong Kong servicemen. Rosindell was supported by Russell Banks and Peter Vorberg throughout the Campaign. Vorberg took over team leadership from Banks Veteran on 31 January 2019. Veteran Banks continued as a RoA advisor to the Campaign until its end on 29 Mar 2023.

In 2019 both the British Ministry of Defence MOD and the British Government formerly recognised the Hong Kong Military Service Corps HKMSC as a regular British Army Corps and not as only a former Hong Kong Garrison Local Employed Personnel LEP unit. *This recognition came about as it was one of the discussion areas brought forward by the RoA Campaign / evidence brought forward.

On 29 Mar 2023, it was agreed by the British Government and announced this day that RoA in the United Kingdom will be sanctioned to those ex-Hong Kong Servicemen not given RoA on or the handover to PRC China in 1997 under the title, 'New Settlement Route for former Hong Kong Servicemen. *See the British Government statement below.

== Facilities ==
- Depot Hong Kong Military Service Corps, Lyemun Barracks
- Stonecutters Island – now a PLA Naval base and no longer an "island"

== See also ==
- Royal Hong Kong Regiment
- British Army Aid Group
- Hong Kong Adventure Corps
- Hong Kong Air Cadet Corps
- Hong Kong Sea Cadet Corps
- Hong Kong Chinese Regiment
- Hong Kong Volunteer Company
- Royal Hong Kong Auxiliary Air Force
- Volunteer Force (Great Britain)
