= Lei Yue Mun Park and Holiday Village =

Holiday resort in Hong Kong

- Lyemun Barracks (former name)
- 鯉魚門公園及度假村
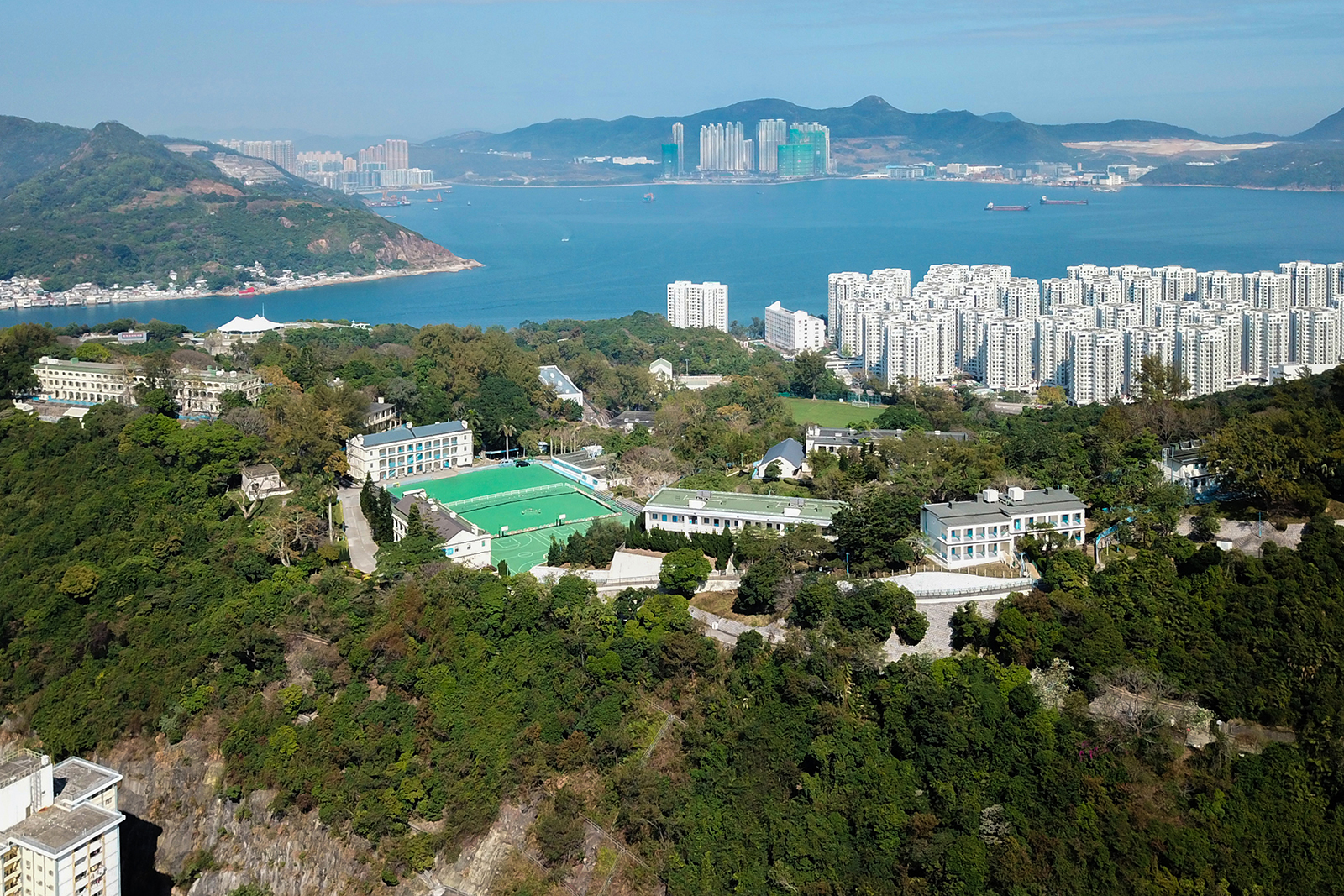
- Overview of Lei Yue Mun Park and Holiday Village in February 2018
- Interactive map of Lei Yue Mun Park and Holiday Village
- Type: Holiday village
- Location: Shau Kei Wan
- Area: 22.97 hectares (0.2297 km^{2})
- Established: 1889; 137 years ago

Chinese name
- Traditional Chinese: 鯉魚門公園及度假村
Transcriptions
Yue: Cantonese
- Yale Romanization: Léih yùh mùhn gūng yún kahp douh gaa chyūn
- Jyutping: Lei5 jyu4 mun4 gung1 jyun2 kap6 dou6 gaa3 cyun1

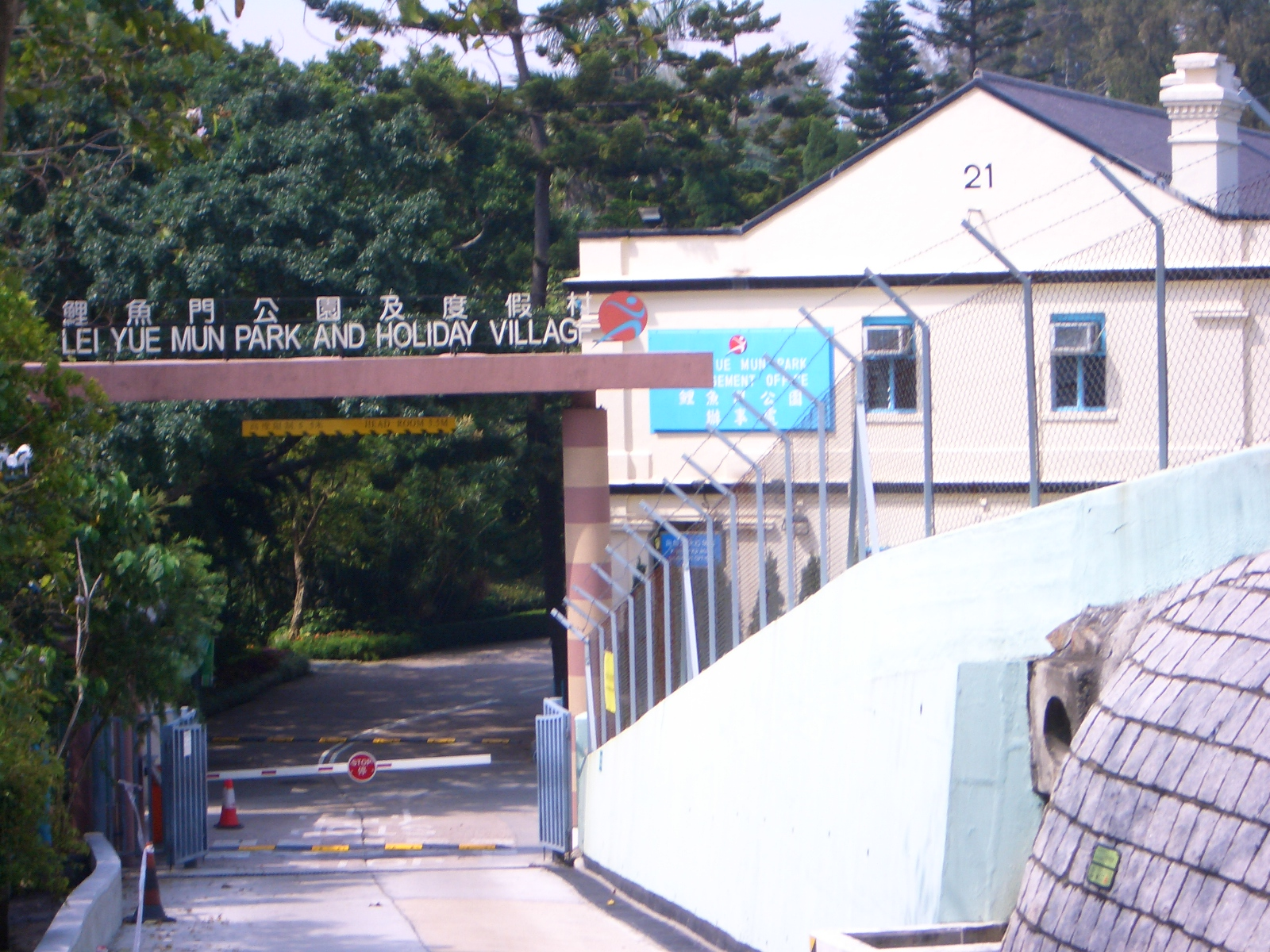
Entrance of Lei Yue Mun Park and Holiday Village.

Lei Yue Mun Park and Holiday Village is a holiday village in the east of Shau Kei Wan, facing Lei Yue Mun, with an area of 22.97 hectares (0.2297 km^{2}). It was formerly known as Lyemun Barracks, barracks for the British soldiers stationed in Hong Kong, before being converted into a holiday village. It is the only holiday camp owned by the government in the urban districts of Hong Kong (Hong Kong Island and Kowloon).

== History ==
=== Early Construction ===
Lyemun Barracks was named after the fishing village of Lei Yue Mun. The old Lyemun Barracks was one of the earliest and most important British Army fortifications in Hong Kong. Situated at the northeast corner of Hong Kong Island overlooking the eastern approach to the Victoria Harbour, Lei Yue Mun occupied a strategic position. It was for this reason that the British army had already constructed barracks on Sai Wan Hill just south of the coastline as early as 1844. However, the rampant spread of diseases such as malaria and dysentery at the time caused many soldiers and civilians to fall ill and die, leading the British forces to subsequently withdraw. Eventually, amid fears of potential incursions from Russia and France, the British army elected to build permanent infrastructure and fortifications at the entrance to the Lyemun Channel in 1885, with funds allocated by the then Governor of Hong Kong, Sir John Pope Hennessy. Later in 1889, the land was transferred to the War Department for the construction. The Barracks consisted mainly of three portions:

The central area: Main Barracks (Lei Yue Mun Park and Holiday Village)

The western ridge: Upper Fort (Sai Wan Battery)

The headland: (Lei Yue Mun Fort, now the Hong Kong Museum of Coastal Defence, Pak Sha Wan Battery)

The fortifications of Lei Yue Mun had already become an important point of coastal defence during the 1890s and continued to expand in the following decades. By the 1930s, however, the strategic importance of Lei Yue Mun had declined considerably as a result of technological and tactical advances.

The main barracks in the central area were completed between 1889 and 1939. These barracks were primarily used as offices for the British military, soldier's quarters and training grounds until the British Army withdrew from the Lyemun Barracks in 1987 and the subsequent handover to the Government.

=== Significance in World War II (1941–1945) ===
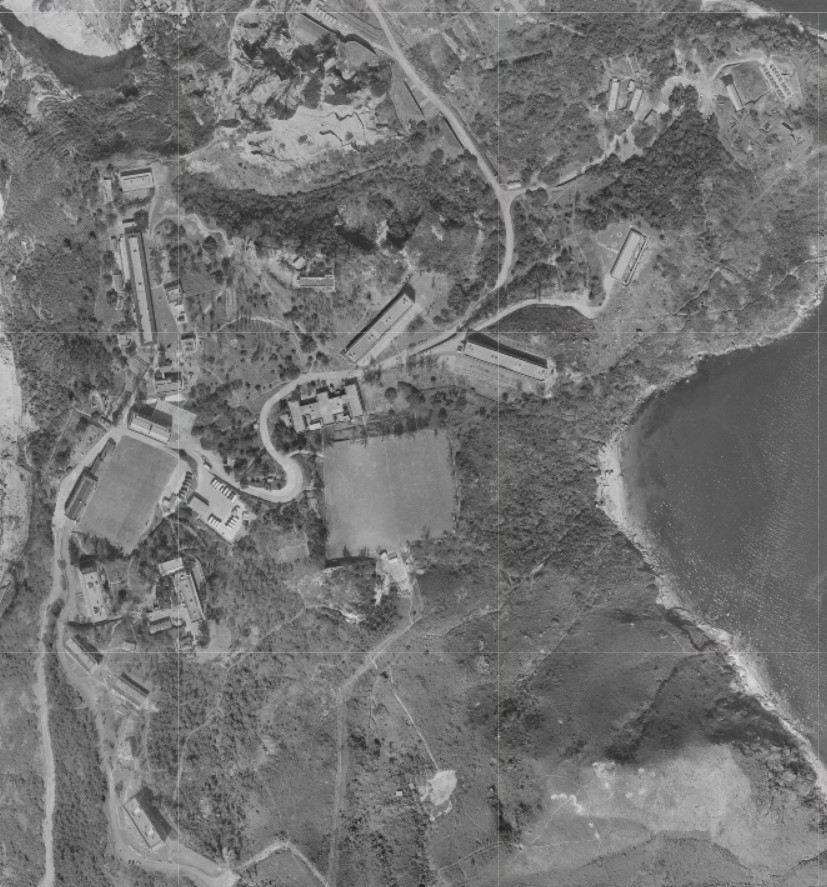
Lyemun Barracks as seen from aerial surveillance in 1963.

The Japanese army commenced the attack on Hong Kong on 8 December 1941, and had forced all British regular and colonial troops to retreat from the New Territories and the Kowloon Peninsula to Hong Kong Island 5 days later on 13 December 1941. Lyemun Barracks became a focal point in the Japanese army's attack on Hong Kong Island. The coastline was defended by the 5th Battalion, 7th Rajput Regiment along with the Royal Rifles of Canada. A small contingent of Canadian troops was stationed around the Lower Battery, while the artillery unit at Lyemun Barracks was composed of the Hong Kong Naval Volunteer Force and the Hong Kong-Singapore Royal Artillery. The upper battery section was defended by the Hong Kong Volunteer Defence Corps. The Japanese army began their artillery bombardment on December 14 from the opposite shore on Devil's Peak and made their first attempt to land the following evening, retreating without success. Between 16 December and 17 December, Hong Kong Island suffered heavy shelling, causing the roads from Central to Shau Kei Wan to be blocked by tram cables and debris. By the evening of 18 December 1941, the Lyemun barracks began to suffer a large-scale attack. At 8:30 that evening, the first wave of Japanese troops crossed the Lei Yue Mun channel and commenced attack on the barracks, followed by a second wave of Japanese troops two hours later. One battalion landed at Shau Kei Wan, while another deboarded next to the Lower Battery. The Japanese army eventually broke through the defense of the Indian troops to the west of the barracks after rounds of gunfire and occupied Mount Parker behind the barracks the next morning. Simultaneously, the Japanese troops that had landed at the dock were also advancing toward the Sai Wan Battery.

The Canadian forces launched a full counterattack despite being heavily outnumbered. However, on 19 December 1941, the Barracks along with the Sai Wan Battery fell into the hands of the Japanese. At 7:45 PM, a detachment of Japanese soldiers along with collaborators, broke through the fence in a lorry, killing the British sentries at the Sai Wan Battery using bombs. The 29 remaining British soldiers were then locked in an ammunition magazine until around midnight, when the Japanese ordered them to come out, and proceeded to bayonet all of the soldiers. Two Chinese-British soldiers survived by hiding under the corpses, escaping successfully after four days of lying still amongst the corpses.

There were counterattacks made by 'C' Company of the Royal Rifles of Canada to recapture the battery and the barracks during the 19th of December. However, the Japanese having the advantage of high ground and being well-entrenched rendered the counterattacks unsuccessful.

=== Conversion to the Holiday Village ===
The Barracks housed the Depot and Record Office of the Hong Kong Military Service Corps between 1948 and 1984, and since 1948 have been used as training grounds for the Royal Hong Kong Regiment. The Barracks were then handed over to the Government in 1987 upon the withdrawal of the British Army.

The construction of the Island Eastern Corridor between August 1986 and October 1989 separated the headland from the main barracks and the western ridge. As a result, the main barracks were converted to the Lei Yue Mun Park and Holiday Village in 1988 and was then opened to the public, while the headland was left isolated until the Lei Yue Mun Fort was converted into the Hong Kong Museum of Coastal Defence in 2000. The Pak Sha Wan Battery and its nearby barracks remain isolated and is not open to the public to this day.

The whole former barracks compound is graded as Grade I historic building because of its historic significance. The buildings of the compound are graded as Grade I and II historic buildings separately, however.

=== SARS Outbreak ===
During the outbreak of the Severe acute respiratory syndrome (SARS) in 2003, a larger cluster of cases in Hong Kong were focused on the Amoy Gardens housing estate, particularly in Block E. Its spread was later suspected to have been facilitated by defects in its drainage system, and it was subsequently discovered that fecal-oral transmission of SARS was possible. By March, the total number of infected people have reached over 200, 137 of those residing in Block E. By the end of the month, the government issued an order to transfer the remaining unaffected residents of Block E into isolation in the Lei Yue Mun Park and Holiday Village and the Lady MacLehose Holiday Village in Sai Kung. The residents were subsequently returned to their homes after Hong Kong was removed from the World Health Organization (WHO)'s list of 'Affected Areas' in late-June 2003.

=== Coronavirus ===
In January 2020, SARS-CoV-2 emerged in Wuhan, China, and began spreading across the globe. By January 22nd, 2 confirmed cases of COVID-19 emerged in the SAR and the government set up two quarantine locations, the Lei Yue Mun Park and Holiday Village and the Lady MacLehose Holiday Village. 5 citizens who came in close contact with the 2 victims of the coronavirus were put into isolation at one of the two quarantine camps. The facility consisting of 350 units was put into operation in July 2020, specifically for treating mild patients under the age of 50. The Holiday Village, now managed by the Leisure and Cultural Services Department, will be closed from June 2026 onwards to commence demolition of the isolation facilities, and will aim to reopen to the public by October 2026.

== Buildings and facilities ==
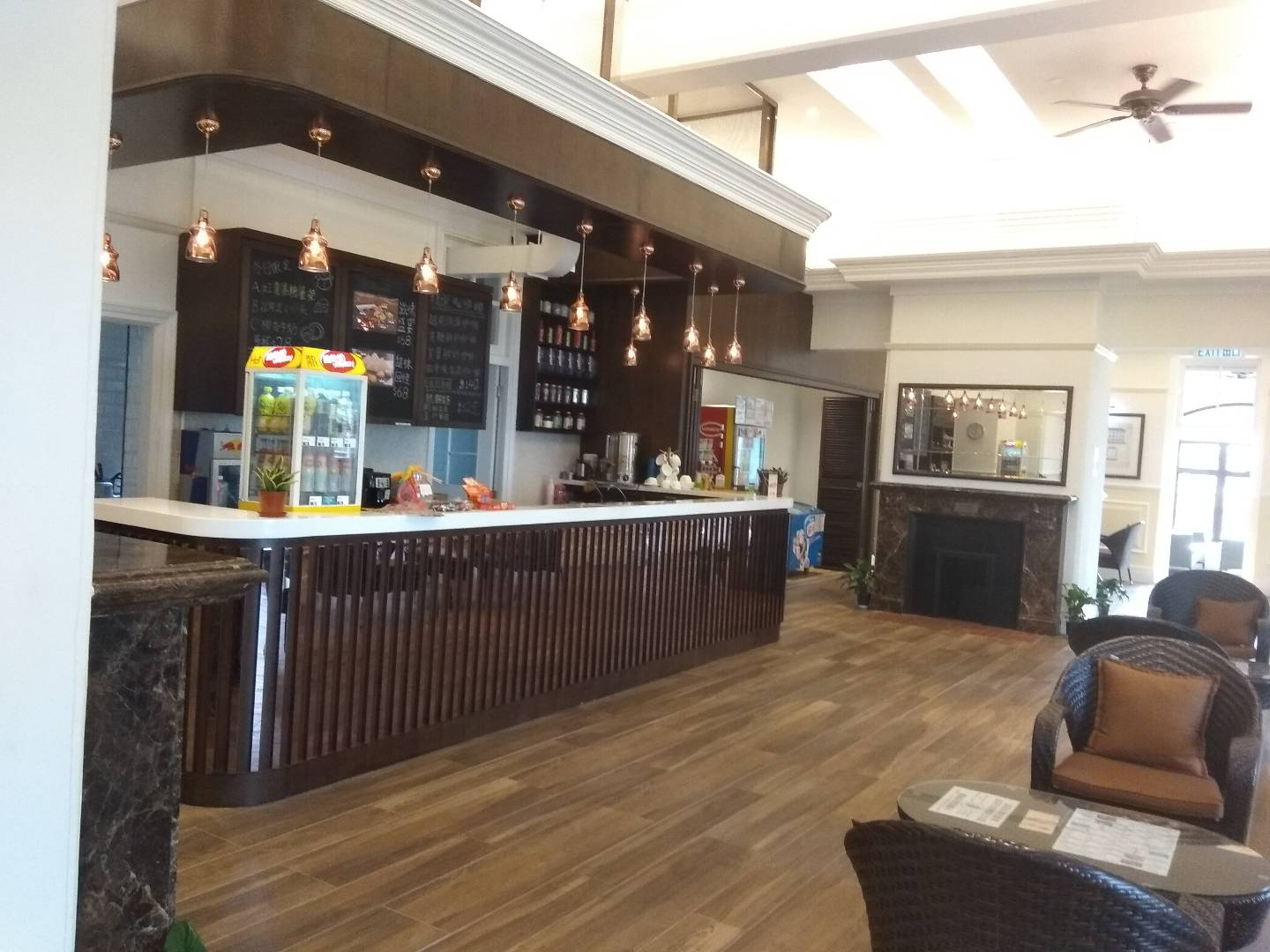
The interior of Block 7, the 'Coffee Corner'.

=== Facilities ===
The holiday village include a total of 4 family hostels and 2 group hostels, all provided with balconies, bedrooms, and lavatories with showering facilities, accommodating the living of up to 282 people. The holiday village offers facilities such as rope courses, an archery range, a public horse-riding school, tennis courts, basketball courts, football pitches, as well as other facilities for numerous indoor and outdoor entertainment. The barracks once housed by soldiers were transformed into small living quarters for the holiday village. Each block serves a different purpose, functioning as public holiday camp accommodations for visitors and campers. The Main Recreational Centre, Block 10, offers a wide variety of indoor games and activities, including indoor rock climbing, indoor archery and indoor table tennis.

The holiday village also offers facilities for catering and dining. Block 4 serves as the Main Canteen for the Holiday Village, while Block 7 serves as the 'Coffee Corner', an indoor café offering refreshments and light snacks. The Holiday Village also offers an outdoor barbecue area behind Block 10, with Blocks 11 and 12 used as Indoor Barbecue Areas in the event of strong winds and rainy weather.

=== Buildings ===
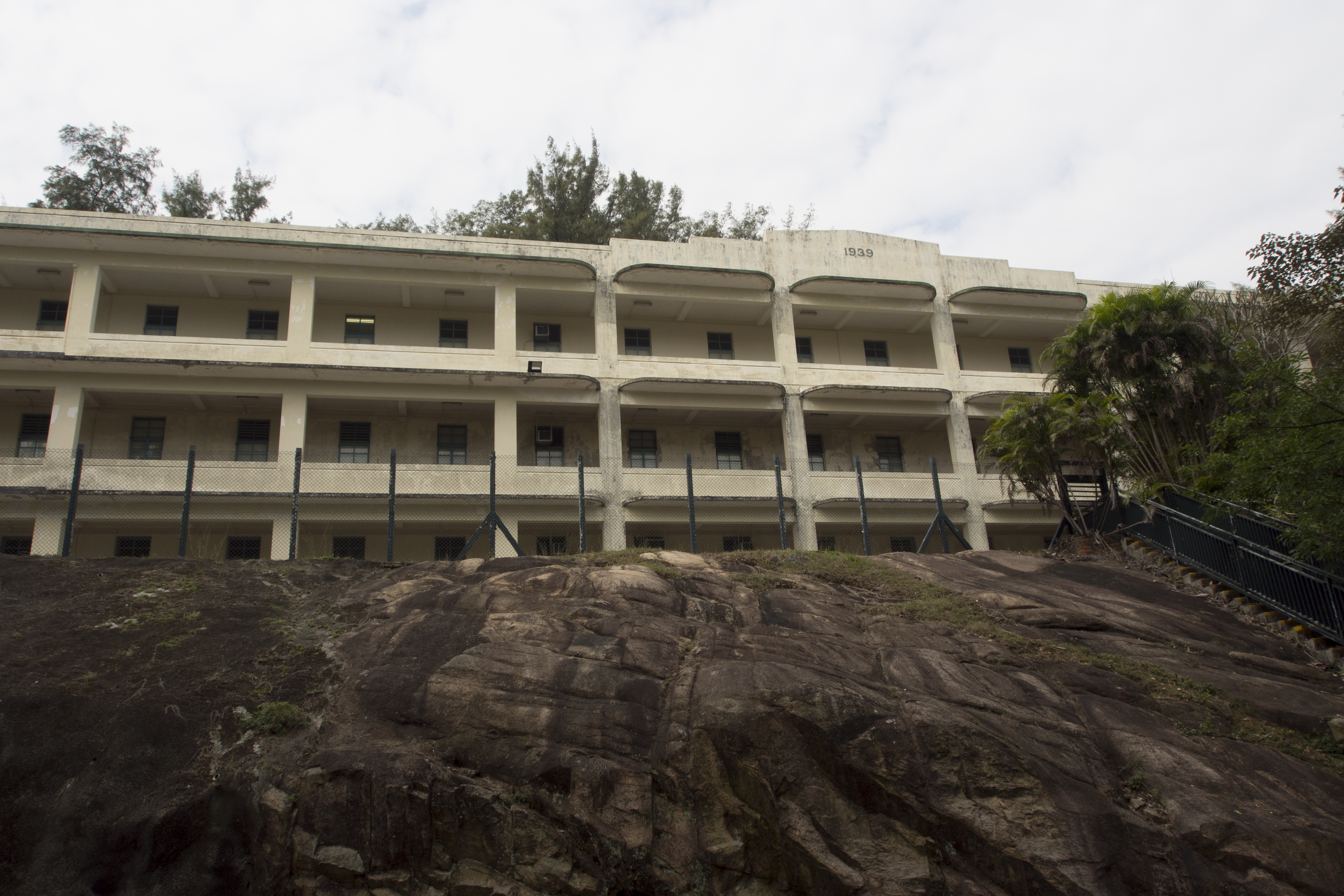
Formerly the Soldiers' Quarters and built in 1939, Block 3 was proposed by the government to be converted into a quarantine facility in May 2016.

As the former Lyemun Barracks was constructed between the late 19th century and the early 20th century, the buildings inside the Holiday Camp were modelled on the European-style buildings at the time of their construction. Most buildings share a similar color scheme, with white as their primary color and light blue as their accent color, often found on window frames. The buildings were located across hillsides, with passageways linking them.

Most of the buildings within the central area of Lyemun Barracks were converted into Lei Yue Mun Park and Holiday Village with only a few exceptions. Block 8, which previously served as the outhouse connected to Block 7, became redundant and was eventually left unused. The area surrounding Block 8 is listed as out of bounds and prohibited to enter, while Block 7 was converted into the Coffee Corner.

Block 3, which previously served as the Soldiers' Quarters, was left without purpose upon the barracks' conversion to the Holiday Village. Despite being located across from Block 4, the Main Canteen, and well within the grounds of the Holiday Village, Block 3 was never integrated into the Holiday Village and does not function as an accommodation for camp visitors. In May 2016, the Food and Environmental Hygiene Department proposed converting Block 3 into a quarantine facility, with the function to prevent epidemics from spreading in case of an outbreak. The conversion would have been scheduled to undergo in late-2017 to 2019, however the proposed plan never went through. As a result, Block 3 was never opened to the public and currently only serves partially as a storage area for the Hong Kong Film Archive.

Some structures and buildings were altered upon the barracks' conversion to the Holiday Village as a result of their renewed purposes. Block 7's original interior layout consisted of 4 moderately-sized individual rooms to accommodate officers of the Royal Artillery. With its current purpose as an indoor café for camp visitors, the walls separating these rooms were removed and the layout now consists of an open, wider central area for easier accessibility.

=== Block 7's Renovation and the History of the Royal Artillery Barracks ===
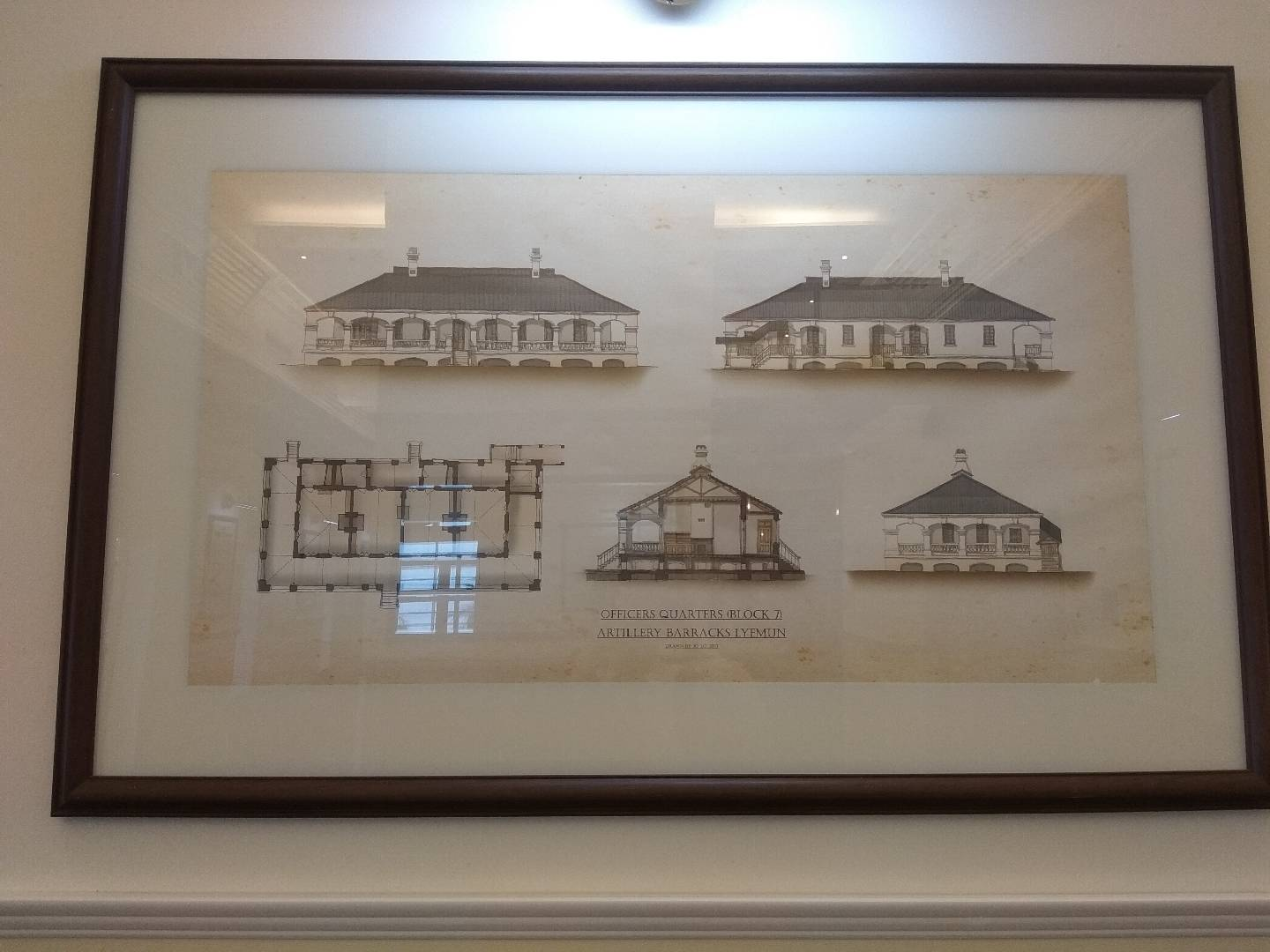
The layout of the Officers' Barracks (Block 7) during its days as part of the Royal Artillery Barracks, with a noticeably different interior structure.

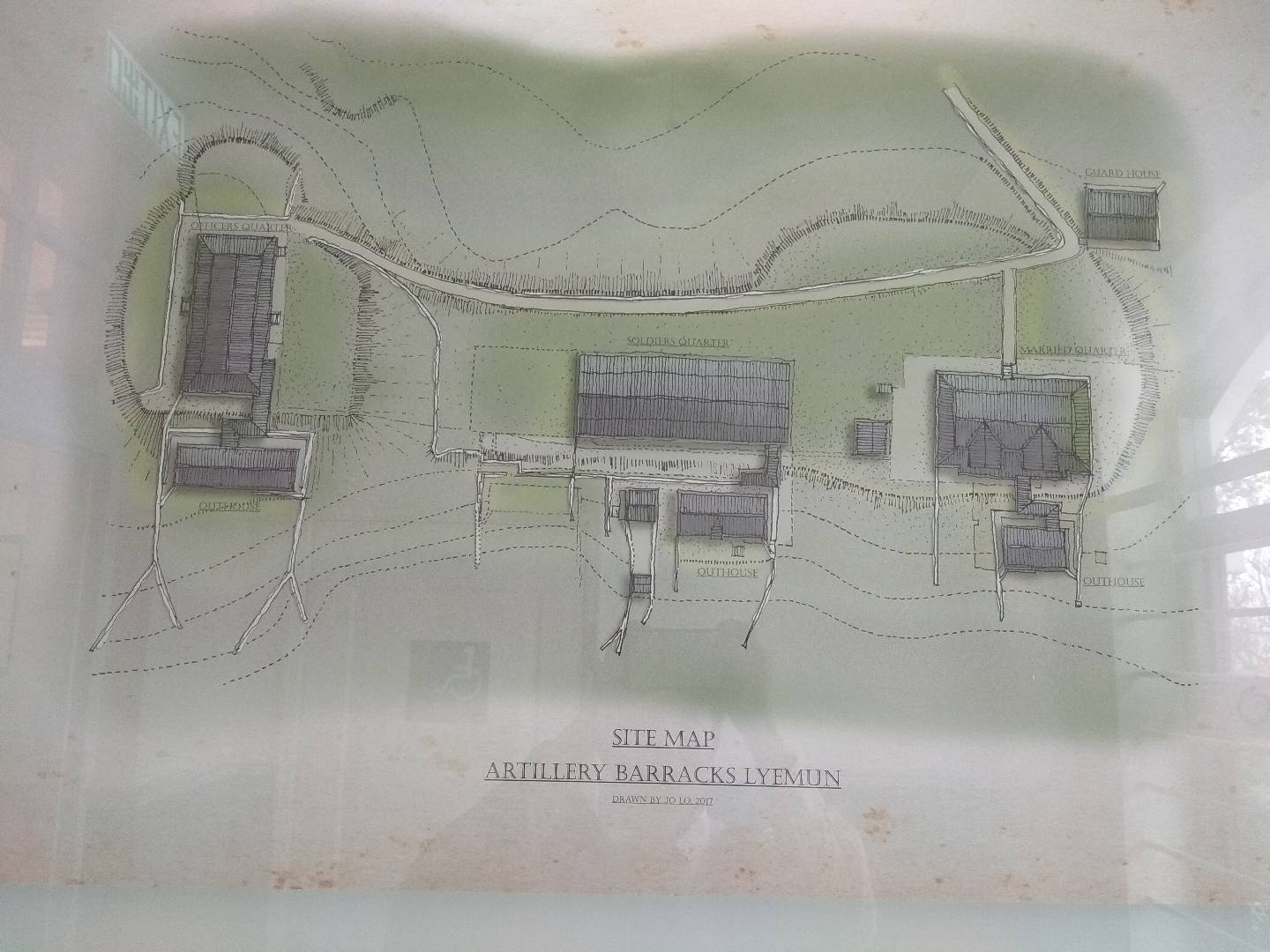
Layout of the Royal Artillery Barracks prior to Block 10's extension in 1935.

In between January and July 2018, Block 7, the 'Coffee Corner', underwent renovation procedures to improve the building's interior. The Coffee Corner was reopened in August 2018 with major changes to the floor, replacing plastic texture sheets with polished wood tiles. Parts of walls and pillars were fitted with dark marble coatings, and general lighting improvements. This renovation also introduced drawings hung on walls, depicting the layout of the previously known Royal Artillery Barracks, housing soldiers of the Royal Regiment of Artillery. This includes the Soldiers' Barracks (Block 10), Officers' Barracks (Block 7), Outhouses (Block 8, Block 11, Block 12, Block 13), Married Quarters (Demolished) and the Guard House (Demolished). These illustrations show each building's exterior and interior structure in their days as the earliest constructed buildings of Lyemun Barracks, presumably prior to 1935, when Block 10 was extended subsequent to the demolition of the Married Quarters, which occupied said space. Block 9, being absent from these illustrations, is presumably yet to be constructed at the time of the residential period of the Royal Artillery Army. Roof slates were also present on most buildings and structures within the barracks, but have since been removed after World War II.

=== Numbers ===
One defining feature of the Holiday Village would be the numbers painted on the exterior of their buildings and structures. The numbers were painted in black and in noticeable places, usually on the side and near the top of the buildings (Most standard-issue British Army garrisons and barracks built from the late 19th century to the early 20th century also utilize painted numbers on their buildings for better navigation). The main purpose of these high-visibility numbers were to help distinguish the buildings of the former Lyemun Barracks from one another, each having been assigned a different number.

It is worth noting that the numbers were not assigned by the order they were constructed (In fact, Blocks 1, 2 and 3 were built in 1939, more recent than most other buildings). Therefore, these numbers were most likely assigned after The Battle of Hong Kong and World War II and during their time as training grounds for the Royal Hong Kong Regiment (This means the Married Quarters and Guard House of the Royal Artillery Barracks were never assigned numbers as they were demolished around 1935). Certain buildings have had their year of completion inscribed convexly, which includes Blocks 2, 3, 10 (Extension in 1935), 30, 31, 32, 33 and 34. Although most buildings within the Holiday Village have retained these numbers, due to maintenance of exteriors and re-painting, some buildings have had their numbers removed in the process or replaced with more modern fonts.

== Pak Sha Wan Battery ==
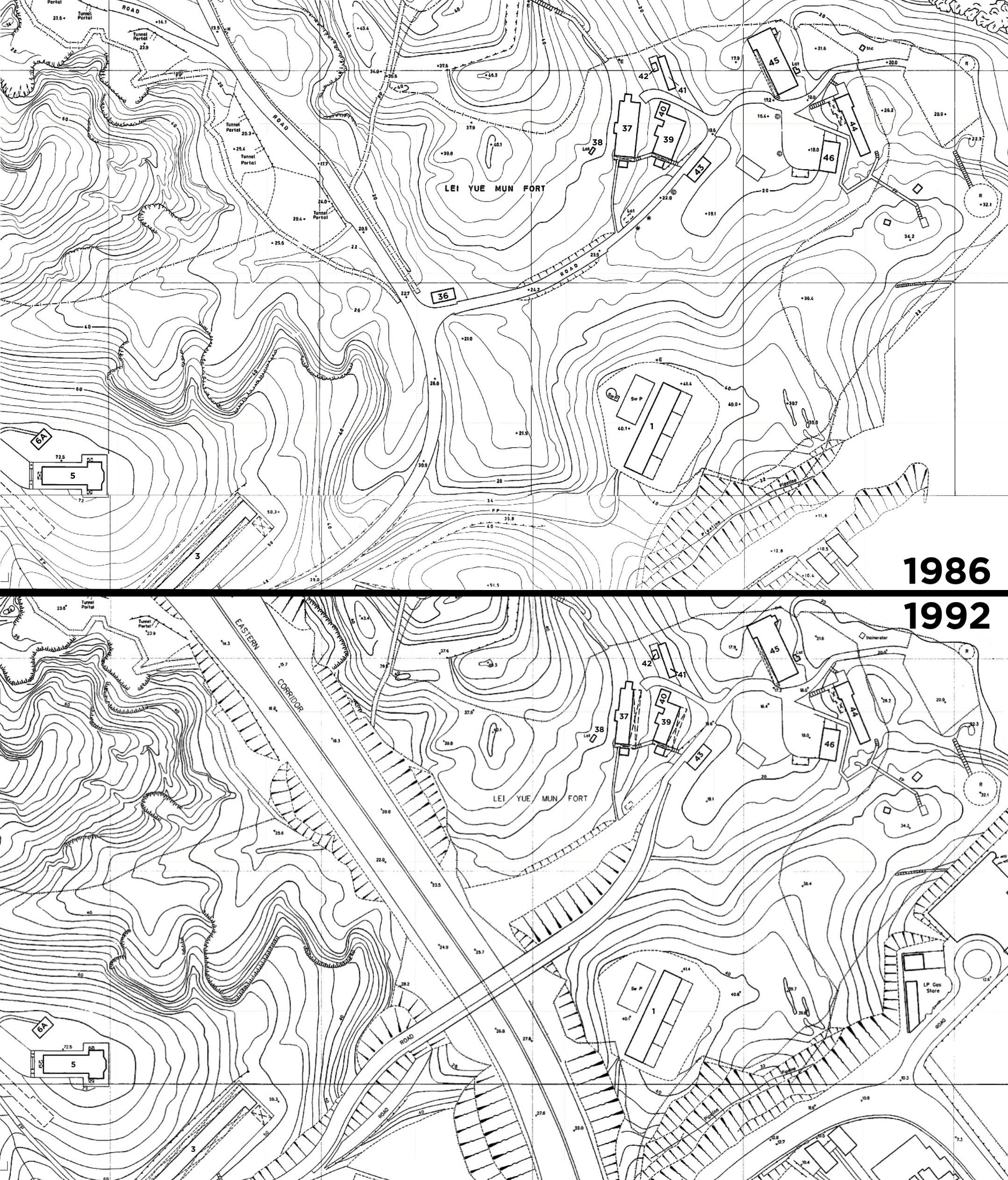
Map of Lyemun Barracks and Pak Sha Wan Battery before (1986) and after (1992) the completion of the Island Eastern Corridor.

In August 1986, the construction of the Island Eastern Corridor commenced the third and final phase, connecting Aldrich Bay and the private housing estate Heng Fa Chuen, which is under construction at the time. The Island Eastern Corridor would pass through A Kung Ngam, separating the main barracks and Sai Wan Battery to the west, with the Lei Yue Mun Fort and Pak Sha Wan Battery to the East. The road travelling north towards the pier at Aldrich Bay and the connecting road towards the headland were both cut off upon completion of the expressway in October 1989. Block 36, which was situated at the junction of the connecting roads was demolished during the construction of the expressway as a result.

A bridge was built over the Island Eastern Corridor afterwards to connect the main area to the headland, however the buildings and structures in the headland were left isolated until 2000, when the Lei Yue Mun Fort was converted to the Hong Kong Museum of Coastal Defence. With the main barracks converted to the Holiday Village in 1988, the bridge along with the Pak Sha Wan Battery and its surrounding barracks were left abandoned to this day. Maintenance in this area is poor, with structures in a state of disrepair and roads covered in fallen leaves and tree branches.

=== Block 1, the 'Changing Room' ===
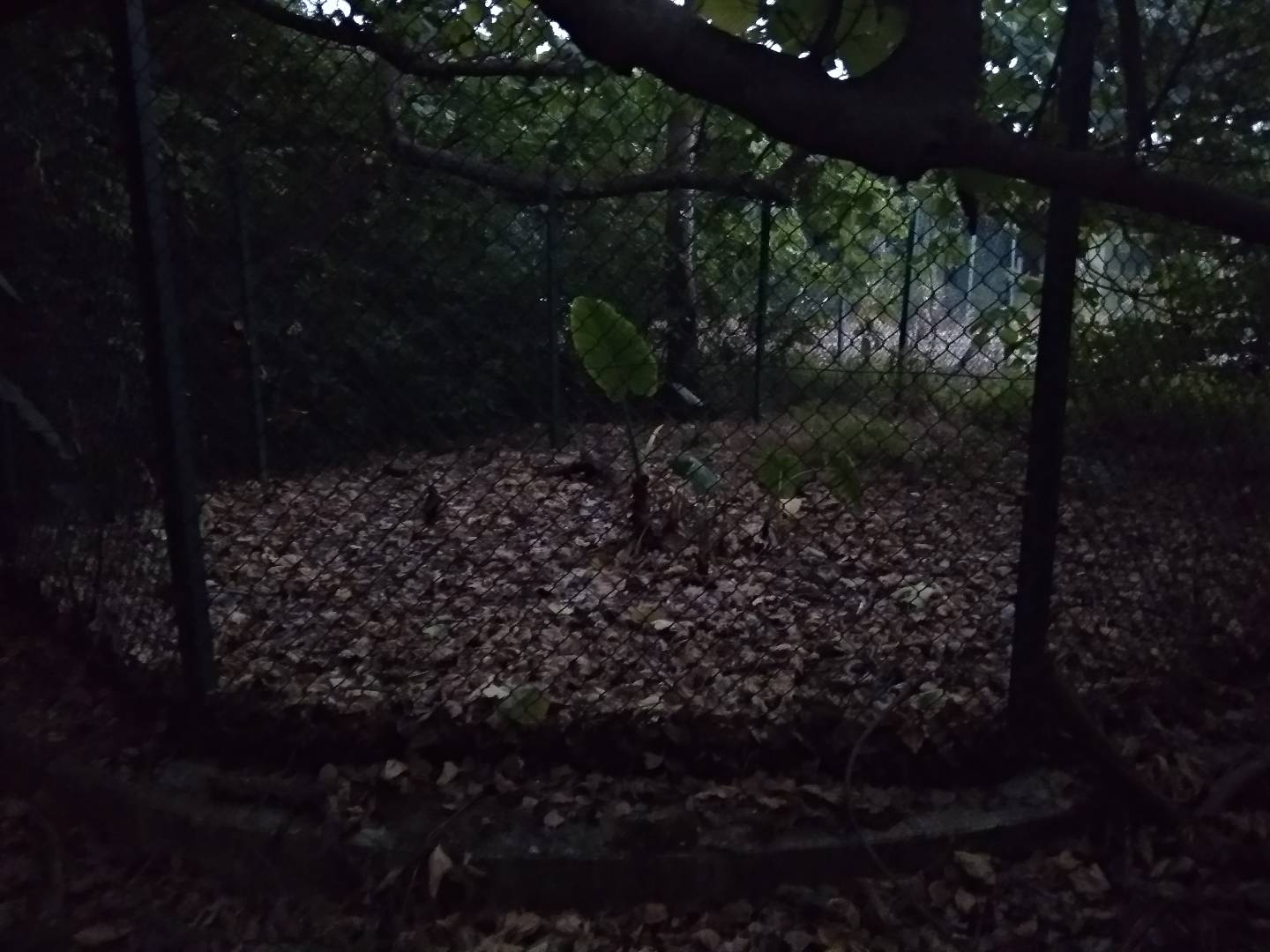
The hot tub besides the swimming pool near Block 1, in poor condition.

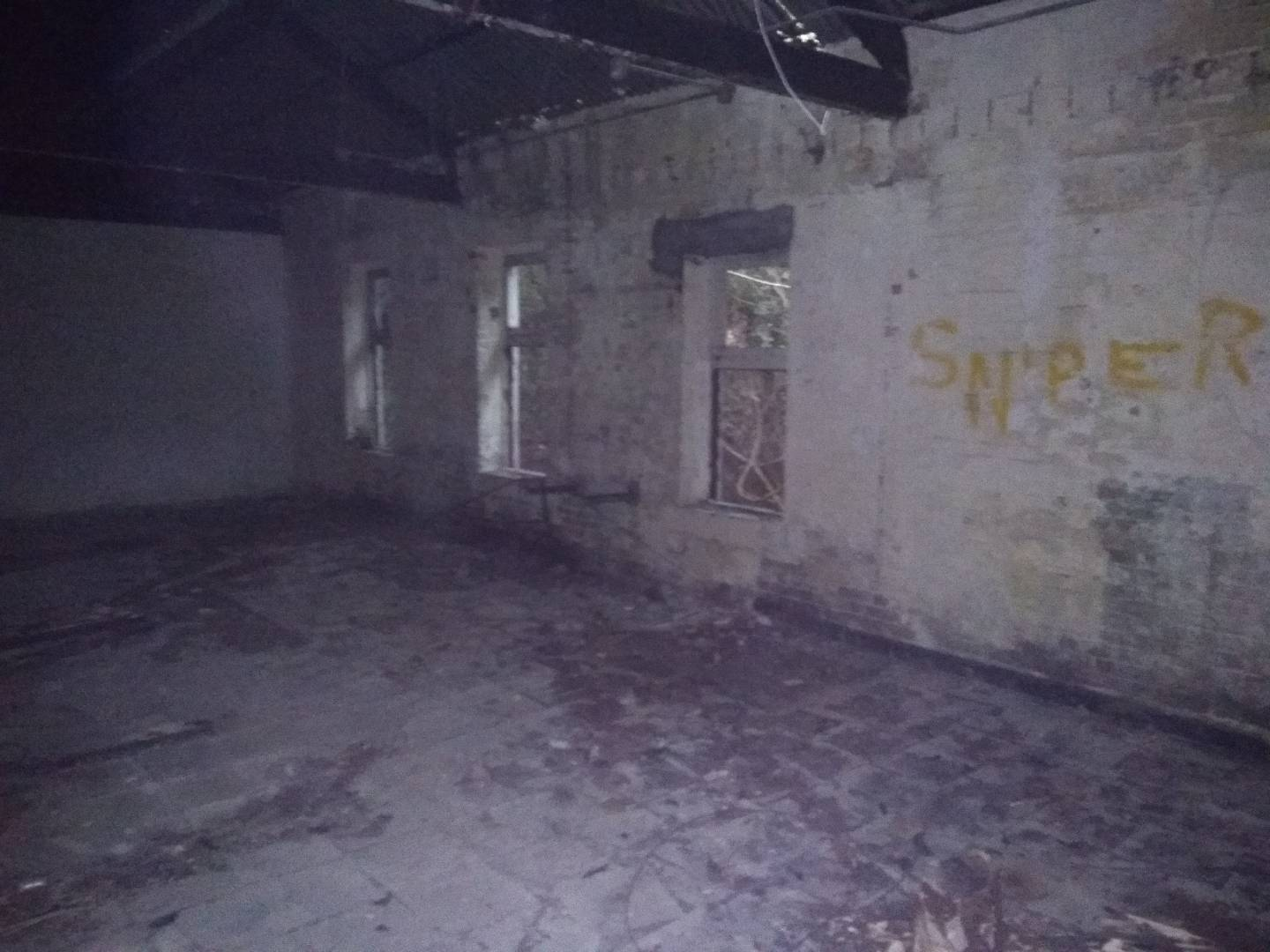
Block 44, 'Sniper Room'.

Block 1 appears as a green and white structure consisting of closed rooms and 4 courtyards. It was constructed around 1939 along with Blocks 2 and 3 and was used as a Changing Room for soldiers adjacent to a rectangular pool along with a hot tub (which have both been filled with concrete). Block 1's structure remains intact, though in poor condition, with glass pieces and layers of dried up paint scattered across the rooms, with broken doors and rusted shower pipes. Several signs pasted on the walls and pillars have also deteriorated and not legible. Prior to the construction of the Island Eastern Corridor, Block 1 was connected to the central area and the main barracks by means of a footpath next to Block 2, in which footpath has since been cut off by the expressway.

=== Block 44, the 'Sniper Room' ===
Block 44 is a 2-storey barracks room within the area around the Pak Sha Wan Battery. Block 44 resembles a sniper ranch with a round window near the roof of the front wall. The white structure remains intact with significant evidence of deterioration, with chipped paint on walls peeled off and broken floor tiles. The impaired condition shared by these isolated and deactivated buildings is a drastic comparison to the buildings converted into parts of the holiday village, in addition to its proof of the barracks' lengthy history. Block 44 was also previously used as the Public Works Department (PWD) Office before it was abandoned.

== Structures and historic buildings ==
The whole compound was graded as a Grade I historic structure, while some buildings were graded as Grade I and Grade II individually, these ratings were confirmed on 18 December 2009.

Three of the buildings in the Holiday Village were declared historical monument on 20 May 2016 and are now protected under the Antiquities and Monuments Ordinance. This includes Block 7, Block 10 and Block 25.

The following are all structures of the former Lyemun Barracks, some of them graded as Historic Buildings.

Number Location Note: [Original] implies that the number appears as its original font, [Replica] implies that it was re-painted on using a different font, represented by [Font].

Block Number	Built	Historic Grade	Current Status	Original Use	Current Use	Number Location	Additional Notes	Photographs
Block 1	Built in 1939	N/A	Isolated	Lyemun Barracks Swimming Pool Changing Room	N/A	Side, Top (Shown in Middle Photograph) [Original]	Isolated from the Holiday Village. Formerly used as a Changing Room for British soldiers prior to trainings carried out in a nearby swimming pool. Unlike the other buildings which utilizes the white and light blue color scheme, this block uses green as its primary exterior color, and white as its main interior color.	Lyemun Barracks block 01
Block 2	Built in 1939	N/A	Demolished in 1992	Soldiers' Quarters	N/A	Presumably Front, Top Left (Identical to Block 3)	Built in 1939 along with Block 3, Block 2 utilized the same architectural style as Block 3, and served the same purpose. In 1992, Block 2 was demolished to allocate space for the construction of the Lei Yue Mun Public Riding School, which was commissioned on 21 November 1992. The middle photograph shows Blocks 1, 2, 3, 4 and 5 in 1971. The bottom picture shows the location of Block 2 on a historical map in 1987.	
Block 3	Built in 1939	Grade II (2009)	In Use	Soldiers' Quarters	Partially used as storage for the Hong Kong Film Archive	Front, Top Left (Shown in Both Photographs) [Original] Currently Removed	Formerly used as Soldiers' Quarters. It was the subject of a proposed plan to be converted into a quarantine facility in 2016Block 3's structure features the International Style of Modern Architecture, and is said to be one of the only remaining structures used for military purposes that ulitizes this model.	
Block 4		N/A	In Use	Unknown	Main Canteen	Removed	The original Block 4's structural design altered throughout history and later split into 3 complementary rooms. (4B, 4C, 4D) The western wing that was constructed at a later date is now the designated Block 4, and serves as the Main Canteen of the Holiday Village.	
Block 4A		N/A	In Use	Staff Quarters	Activity Room	Removed (Replaced with Sign)	Now used as one of the Activity Rooms alongside Blocks 4B and 4C.	
Block 4B		N/A	In Use		Activity Room	Removed (Replaced with Sign)	Now used as one of the Activity Rooms alongside Blocks 4A and 4C.	
Block 4C		N/A	In Use		Activity Room	Removed (Replaced with Sign)	Now used as one of the Activity Rooms alongside Blocks 4A and 4B.	
Block 4D		N/A	In Use		Storage Room	Removed (Replaced with Sign)	Now used as a Storage Room.	
Block 5	Built in 1920s – 1930s	Grade II (2009)	In Use	Church and Garrison Hall	Chapel and Assembly Hall	Front, Top Center (Shown in Photograph) [Original]	Former Church and Garrison Hall of the Barracks, now used as the Chapel of the Holiday Village. It is served as a venue for weddings due to its resemblance to a 20th-century European church.	
Block 6		N/A	In Use	Unknown	Orchid House	Side, Top Center (Shown in Photograph) [Original]	Now used as the Orchid House of the Holiday Village.	
Block 6A		N/A	In Use	Unknown	African Violet House	Front, Top Center (Shown in Photograph)[Original]	Now used as the African Violet House of the Holiday Village.	
Block 7	Built in 1890–1895	Grade I (2009)	In Use	Field Officers' Quarters	Coffee Corner	Side, Top Center (Shown in Photograph) [Original]	Formerly used as the Officers Quarters of the Artillery Barracks, later used as the "HKMSC Training Complex", now used as the Coffee Corner of the Holiday Village. Block 7 went under renovation between January and June 2018. It was declared a monument on 20 May 2016 and is protected under the Antiquities and Monuments Ordinance along with Block 10 and Block 25. The architectural style of Block 7 is “Colonial Vernacular”, which featured the characteristic wide open verandahs on three sides, a raised ground floor and a central “Jack-Roof”.	
Block 8	Built in 1890-1895	N/A	In Use	Outhouse of Field Officers' Quarters	Storage Room	Side, Top Center (Shown in Photographs) [Original]	Formerly an outhouse connected to Block 7 and is now deactivated. The bottom photograph shows the difference in condition between both buildings, with Block 7 in the background. Block 8 is not open to the public and now serves as a storage room of the Holiday Village.	
Block 9	Built in 1930s	N/A	In Use	Unknown	Children Play House	Front, Top Center (Shown in Photograph) [Original]	Now used as the Children Play House of the Holiday Village.	
Block 10	Built in 1890–1895 (Extended in 1935)	Grade I (2009)	In Use	Soldiers' Quarters	Indoor Recreational Centre	Front, Top Center (Shown in Bottom Photograph) [Original]	Formerly used as the Soldiers Quarters of the Artillery Barracks. Now used as the Indoor Recreational Centre of the Holiday Village. It was declared a monument on 20 May 2016 and is protected under the Antiquities and Monuments Ordinance along with Block 7 and Block 25. Block 10 is a rare piece of simplified Classical design architecture. It is a three-storey long rectangular building featuring open arched, colonnaded and balustraded verandahs on the front and rear facades.The segmental arches are supported on square Tuscan order columns. The first and second floor verandahs have classical urn-shaped balustrading. The extension in 1935 was generally constructed to the same scale and to the same design as the older block.	
Block 11		N/A	In Use	Outhouse	Indoor Barbecue Area	Front, Top (Shown in Photograph) [Replica] [Helvetica]	Formerly used as an outhouse of the Artillery Barracks. Now used as an Indoor Barbecue Area.	
Block 12		N/A	In Use	Outhouse	Indoor Barbecue Area	Behind, Top (Shown in Photograph) [Replica] [Helvetica]	Formerly used as an outhouse of the Artillery Barracks. Now used as an Indoor Barbecue Area.	
Block 13		N/A	In Use	Outhouse	Toilet	Front, Top (Shown in Photograph) [Replica] [Helvetica]	Now used as a Latrine of the Holiday Village.	
Married Quarters		N/A	Demolished in 1935	Married Quarters	N/A	N/A	Formerly used as the Married Quarters of the Artillery Barracks. This block was demolished prior to the number assignment.	
Guard House		N/A	Demolished in 1935	Guard House	N/A	N/A	Formerly used as the Guard House of the Artillery Barracks. This block was demolished prior to the number assignment.	
Block 14		N/A	Demolished in 1996	Outhouse	N/A	N/A	Formerly used as an outhouse of the Artillery Barracks connected to the Married Quarters of the Artillery Barracks. Block 14 was situated below Block 10 alongside Blocks 11, 12 and 13 until it was demolished in 1996. The area has been left empty since. The top picture shows the location of Block 14 on Historic Maps. The bottom picture is a photograph taken of Block 14 and its surrounding blocks before 1996.	
Block 15		N/A	In Use	Architectural Services Department Property Services Branch District Management Office	Horticultural Centre	Removed	Built in the location of the former Guard House of the Artillery Barracks after it was demolished. Now used as the Horticultural Centre of the Holiday Village.	
Block 16		N/A	In Use	Unknown	Storage	Front, Top (Shown in Photograph) [Original]	Now used as a Storage Room.	
Block 17	Early 1900s	Grade II (2009)	In Use	Sergeants' Mess	Multi-purpose Centre, Storage	Formerly Side, Top (Shown in Top Photograph) [Original] Front, beside bridge entrance (Shown in Bottom Photograph) [Replica] [Helvetica]	Formerly used as the Sergeants' Mess, now used as a Multi-purpose Centre of the Holiday Village.	
Block 17A		N/A	In Use	Unknown	Storage	Front, Middle (Shown in Photograph) [Replica] [Times New Roman]	Now used as a Storage Room.	
Block 18	Built in late 1890s and early 1990s	Grade I (2009)	In Use	Soldiers' Quarters, Adult School, Company Office & Storage	Multi-purpose Centre	Side, Top (Shown in Bottom Photograph) [Original]	Formerly used as Soldiers' Quarters, Institution, Office and Storage. Now used as a Multi-purpose Centre of the Holiday Village.	
Block 19		N/A	Demolished in 1997	Unknown	N/A	N/A	Not much is known about Block 19, which was a rectangular block near Block 16 before being demolished in 1997. Both pictures show the location of Block 19 prior to its demolishment.	
Block 20	Built in late 1890s and early 1990s	Grade I (2009)	In Use	Ablution House, Cook House	Entertainment Centre (Karaoke Room)	Side, Top (Shown in Photograph) [Replaced with Replica after maintenance] [Arial]	Formerly used as the Bathhouse and Kitchen. Now used as the Entertainment Center of the Holiday Village.	
Block 21	Built in late 1890s and early 1990s	Grade I (2009)	In Use	Soldiers' Quarters	Park Management Office	Side, Top (Shown in Photograph) [Original]	Formerly used as Soldiers' Quarters. Later used as the H.K.M.S.C. Headquarters. Now used as the main park management office of the Holiday Village.	
Block 22		N/A	In Use	Unknown	Toilet, Changing Room	Front Right (Shown in Top Photograph) [Original]	Now used as a Toilet and a Changing Room of the Holiday Village. Block 22 was previously an L-shaped block as shown in the bottom photograph.	
Block 23		N/A	In Use	Garage Office	Store Room	Formerly Side, Top (Shown in Top Photograph) [Original] Currently Front, Top Left (Shown in Bottom Photograph) [Replica] [Calibri]	Formerly used as the office for an Army personnel truck garage. Now used as a Store Room of the Holiday Village.	
Block 24		N/A	In Use (Original Block 24 was demolished in 2000s)	Garage	Plant Nursery	Removed	Originally, Block 24 was a miniature block within the parking area of the Garage near Block 23 before being demolished in the 2000s. The Garage that was repurposed into a Plant Nursery of the Holiday Village is now the designated Block 24.	
Block 25	Built in late 1890s to early 1900s	Grade I (2009)	In Use	Officers' Mess & Quarters	Group Hostel	Center Right (Shown in bottom Photograph) [Replica] [Times New Roman]	Formerly used as Officers' Mess of the Barracks, converted to a group hostel of the Holiday Village. It was declared a monument on 20 May 2016 and is protected under the Antiquities and Monuments Ordinance along with Block 7 and Block 10. Block 25 is a two-storey building with elegant simplified Classical design, featuring open colonnaded and balustraded verandahs on three sides.	
Block 25A		N/A	In Use	Unknown	Group Hostel	Removed (Replaced with sign)	Now used as a Group Hostel of the Holiday Village.	
Block 26		N/A	In Use	Unknown	Storage	Right Side (Shown in Photograph) [Replica] [Times New Roman]	Now used as a Storage Room of the Holiday Village.	
Block 27		N/A	Demolished in 2000s	Latrine	N/A	N/A	Formerly used as a Latrine next to Block 26. Demolished in 2000s.	
Block 28		N/A	In Use	Unknown	Squash Court Room	Formerly Front, Top [Original] (Shown in Top Photograph) Now Front Right (Shown in Bottom Photograph) [Replica] [Times New Roman]	Now used as a Squash Court Room of the Holiday Village.	
Block 29		N/A	In Use	Garage	Storage	Right Side (Shown in Photograph) [Replica] [Times New Roman]	Formerly used as a vehicle garage. Now used as multiple storage rooms.	
Block 30	Built in 1936	Grade I (2009)	In Use	Married Soldiers' Quarters	Family Hostel	Side, Top Center (Shown in Top Photograph) [Original] Front, Top, Alongside the word 'MASEFIELD' (Shown in Bottom Photograph)[Original]	"Masefield Block", named after English poet and writer John Masefield. Formerly used as Married Quarters. Now used as a family hostel of the Holiday Village.	
Block 31	Built in 1907 (Inscribed on side)	Grade I (2009)	In Use	Married Soldiers' Quarters	Family Hostel	Removed, presumably under the words "Shakespeare"	"Shakespeare Block", named after English poet William Shakespeare. Formerly used as Married Quarters. Now used as a family hostel of the Holiday Village.	
Block 32	Built in 1909 (Inscribed on side)	Grade I (2009)	In Use	Married Soldiers' Quarters	Family Hostel	Side, Top, Under the words "Tennyson" (Shown in Photograph) [Original]	"Tennyson Block", named after English poet Alfred Tennyson. Formerly used as Married Quarters. Now used as a family hostel of the Holiday Village.	
Block 33	Built in 1938 (Inscribed on side of top floor)	Grade II (2009)	Not In Use	Married Soldiers' Quarters, Staff Duty Rooms	N/A	Removed	"Milton Block", named after English poet John Milton. Formerly used as Married Quarters of the Lyemun Barracks. It was also formerly the Staff Duty Rooms of the Holiday Village but has now been left unused and showing signs of deterioration.	
Block 34	Built in 1936 (Inscribed on side)	Grade II (2009)	In Use	Married Soldiers' Quarters	Family Hostel	Removed, presumably under the words "Wordsworth"	"Wordsworth Block", named after English poet William Wordsworth. Formerly used as Married Quarters. Now used as a family hostel of the Holiday Village.	
Block 35	Built in 1982	N/A	In Use	Office	Activity Room	Removed (Replaced with Sign)	Built in 1982 replacing a playground next to Block 34. Formerly used as an office of the barracks. Now used as an Activity Room of the Holiday Village.	
Block 36		N/A	Demolished between 1986 and 1989	Unknown	N/A	N/A	Located at the junction of the roads leading to the headland and Aldrich Bay from the main barracks area, Block 36 was demolished during the construction of the Island Eastern Corridor.	
Block 37		N/A	In Use	Soldiers' Barracks	Storage (Hong Kong Museum of Coastal Defence)	Front, Top Left (Shown in Bottom Photograph) [Original]	Now used as a Storage Room for the Hong Kong Museum of Coastal Defense, and is one of the two only blocks within the area that is currently being used. Formerly used as a Barracks room.	
Block 38		N/A	Isolated	Latrine	N/A	Front (Shown in Photograph) [Original]	Formerly used as a Latrine of the barracks, now abandoned and left unused.	
Block 39		N/A	Isolated	Soldiers' Barracks	N/A	Front, Top Left (Shown in Photograph) [Original]	Formerly used as a Barracks room, connected to Block 40. It is now abandoned and left unused.	
Block 40		N/A	Isolated	Soldiers' Barracks	N/A	Beside Entrance (Shown in Photograph) [Original]	Formerly used as a Barracks room, connected to Block 39. It is now abandoned and left unused.	
Block 41		N/A	Isolated	Ablution Block	N/A	Side (Shown in Photograph) [Original]	Formerly used as a showering facility of the barracks, now abandoned and left unused.	
Block 42	Built in 1982	N/A	Isolated	Latrine	N/A	Side (Shown in Photograph) [Original]	Formerly used as a Latrine of the barracks connected to Block 41, now abandoned and left unused.	
Block 43		N/A	In Use	Unknown	Storage (Hong Kong Museum of Coastal Defence)	Side (Shown in Photograph) [Original]	Now used as a Storage Room for the Hong Kong Museum of Coastal Defense, and is one of the two only blocks within the area that is currently being used.	
Block 44		N/A	Isolated	Soldiers' Barracks, PWD Office		Front, Top (Shown in Photograph) [Original]	'Sniper Room'. Formerly used as a Barracks Room and a War Shelter for the Lyemun Barracks. Subsequently served as the Public Works Department (PWD) Office. Now abandoned and left unused.	
Block 45	Built in 1982	N/A	Isolated	Soldiers' Barracks	N/A	Side (Shown in Bottom Photograph) [Original]	'Hall-Fire Room'. Formerly used as a Barracks Room for the Lyemun Barracks. Now abandoned and left unused.	
Block 46		N/A	Isolated	Machinery Storage	N/A	Front (Shown in Photograph) [Original]	'Engine House'. Formerly used as a storage room for machinery and engines. Subsequently served as the Public Works Department (PWD) Workshop. In front of Block 46 is an anti-aircraft cannon kept in good condition.	
Block 47		N/A	Demolished in 1996	Unknown	N/A	N/A	Block 47 was a T-Shaped compact building connected to Block 31 via footpath. Demolished in 1996, Block 47 was possibly a storage room to Block 31 similarly to Block 48 being a storage room connected to Block 32.	
Block 48		N/A	In Use	Unknown	Storage	Front Top (Shown in Photograph) [Original]	Now used as a Storage Room. Block 48 is connected to Block 32 via footpath.	
Block 49		N/A	In Use	Hostel	Snooker Room	Beside Entrance, Side (Shown in Photographs) [Original]	Formerly used as a Hostel and is now used as a Snooker Room of the Holiday Village. However, this block is rarely used and its interior has deteriorated over time. This is the only known building to have its number painted on the side of the building and besides the entrance. Block 49 is also connected to Block 34.	
Block 50		N/A	In Use	Unknown	Storage	Left Side (Shown in Photograph) [Original]	Now used as a Storage Room.	
Block 51		N/A	Demolished in 1999	Unknown	N/A	N/A	Located near Blocks 4 and 4A. Similar size to Block 50 and was possibly used for storage purposes before being demolished in 1999.	
Block 52		N/A	Deactivated	Pump Room	N/A	Front, Left [Original]	Located outside the Barracks and beside Chai Wan Road and the Park's entrance. Formerly used as the Pump Room for the Barracks.	
