= Canton Coolie Corps =

British Army logistics unit

- Active: 1860
- Country: British Hong Kong
- Branch: British Colonial Auxiliary Forces
- Type: Logistics support
- Size: 3,000 men
- Engagements: Second Opium War

Commanders
- Notable commanders: John Temple

The Canton Coolie Corps was a British Army logistics unit raised in 1860 for service in the latter part of the Second Opium War. The unit was recruited from Chinese men, typically from members of the Hakka people, who would serve as coolies, manual labourers who carry goods. Recruitment was slowed due to false rumours that the British intended to use the coolies as human shields in battle but around 3,000 out of a targeted 4,000 were mustered. The unit served in the march on Beijing and were well regarded. It was disbanded at the end of the war.

== Background ==
The Second Opium War between Britain and Qing China broke out in 1856 following a dispute over the detention of a British-registered merchant vessel by the Chinese. The British were soon joined in the war by France, who cited the murder of a French missionary in China as a casus belli. The Chinese cities of Canton (Guangzhou, near the British colony of Hong Kong) and Tianjin, further north near the capital Beijing, were quickly captured and a peace treaty, the Treaty of Tientsin, signed. The treaty permitted the foreign import of opium to China and the residence of foreign officials at Beijing.

Following the signing of the treaty, the British withdrew from Tianjin but an attempt to escort officials to Beijing failed, with an Anglo-French force being repelled in the 1859 Battle of Taku Forts (the forts guarded the approach to Tianjin and, via the Hai River, to Beijing). Afterwards, the Chinese refused to ratify the Treaty of Tientsin and the British and French planned to renew hostilities.

== Formation ==
The British Army had no permanent logistics units stationed in East Asia so Lieutenant-General Sir Hope Grant ordered, in February 1860, the formation of the Canton Coolie Corps to support his upcoming operations (coolie is a term for a labourer who carries goods). The unit was intended to number around 4,000 men, drawn from the Chinese population in and near Hong Kong. It was split into ten companies, each of which was intended to be allocated to an individual British regiment to carry supplies. Additionally, the corps included a team of Chinese and Indian Army medical personnel. It was commanded by Major John Temple, seconded from the 12th Madras Native Infantry.

Temple was allocated a budget of £7,700 to recruit coolies. He preferred to select men of the Hakka people of northern China rather than the Punti of the Canton region as Temple considered the Hakka to be stronger and more suited to the work. Salaries were set at 5 yuan a month for coolies, around that of a skilled Chinese stonemason and greater than that available for other unskilled work. Some of the coolies, particularly those that could speak English, were appointed to the roles of assistant headman and headman, receiving 7 and 10 yuan a month respectively. The headman roles were intended to serve as assistants to the British officers and as translators. Chinese medical staff were paid 30 yuan a month. Food was provided in addition to the salary.

The coolies were given a uniform of a blue jacket, of Chinese style, and loose blue trousers. The jacket had the man's identification number and that of his company on the front and back in a circle. Each man also received a bamboo Asian conical hat with the letters CCC painted on the front. Men often kept their hair in the queue (pigtail) style mandated, on pain of death, by the Qing government.

British personnel were seconded from their regiments and comprised Captain Evans of the Royal Marine Light Infantry as deputy to Temple, 12 subalterns, 11 company sergeants (one to each company plus a clerk) and 280 privates. The British personnel received a supplement to their standard pay. British personnel wore the uniforms of their parent units, except that officers additionally wore white piping down each leg of their trousers.

== Pre-deployment ==
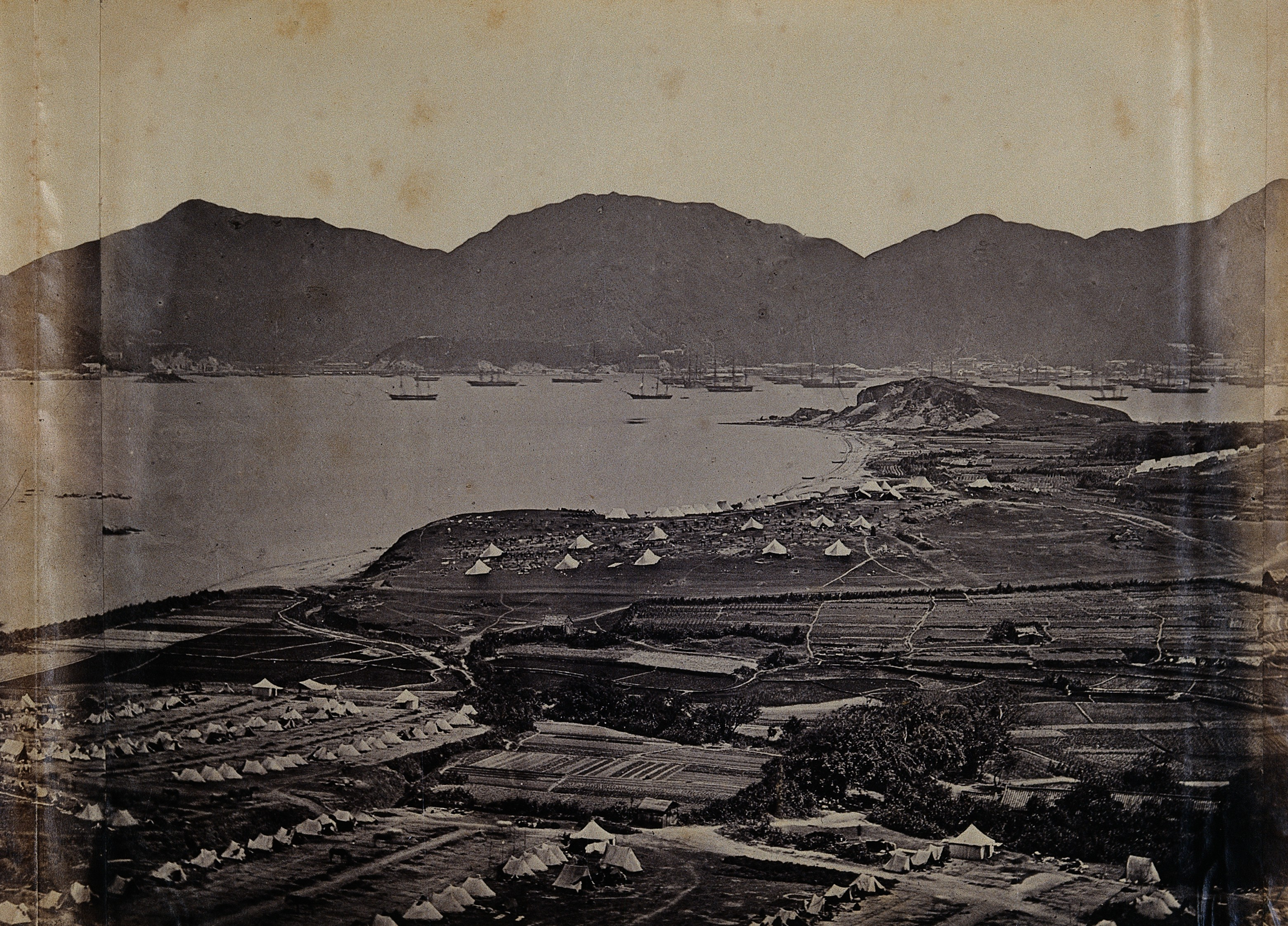
The Anglo-French encampment at Hong Kong, 1860

In the early stages, desertion proved a problem for the corps, particularly after false rumours spread among the coolies that they were to be used as human shields to protect British troops. Attempts by the British to have the coolies drill in formation lent credence to the rumours. The rumours meant the unit mustered only around half its mandated strength in the first few weeks. The British command attempted to reduce desertion by paying two months' salary in advance and increasing wages to 9 yuan a month for coolies, 11 yuan for assistant headmen and 14 yuan for headmen. Discipline gradually improved and desertion lessened, with the corps able to muster around 3,000 men in total.

The corps was housed in bamboo barrack blocks in Happy Valley, Hong Kong, before embarkation for North China. The first detachment of around 300 men embarked for service in mainland China at the end of April 1860. When transported by ship, the coolies were required to sleep below decks, as a precaution against any escape over the side. This led to some illness from the heat in the confined quarters. A detachment of 800 coolies were embarked on the storeship HMS Assistance on 1 June. The vessel ran aground in Deep Water Bay soon after leaving Hong Kong; a rush to jump overboard was prevented by British troops and more experienced coolies who recognised that the ship could be kept afloat for some hours. Seven coolies were lost in the incident, either deserted or drowned.

== Service on campaign ==
In late July 1860, the Canton Coolie Corps landed with the 19,000-strong Anglo-French expeditionary force at Beitang. The corps proved its worth in unloading the expedition's supplies through deep mud. Their efforts were rewarded by British commanders with an increase in their food rations, though some of the coolies had been mistreated by Royal Navy personnel during the unloading operation, despite orders against such. During August, the coolies carried water and baggage between the beachhead and the troops in the field. The coolies were responsible for carrying ammunition, luggage, rations, firewood, water and spare clothing to their assigned regiment, as well as the transfer of wounded and sick men. Each regiment's officer was also assigned two coolies to carry his personal baggage. Each man carried around 50 pounds (23 kg) of supplies, with more possible if a carrying pole was used. The corps also used locally sourced wooden wagons capable of carrying 400 pounds (180 kg) of equipment. Lieutenant-Colonel Garnet Wolseley, the British deputy-assistant quartermaster-general, noted that each coolie was capable of carrying loads that would normally be allocated to three pack animals. During the march on Dagu (Taku Forts), the coolies assisted the British artillery by pulling their guns and ammunition after many of the limber horses died from exhaustion.

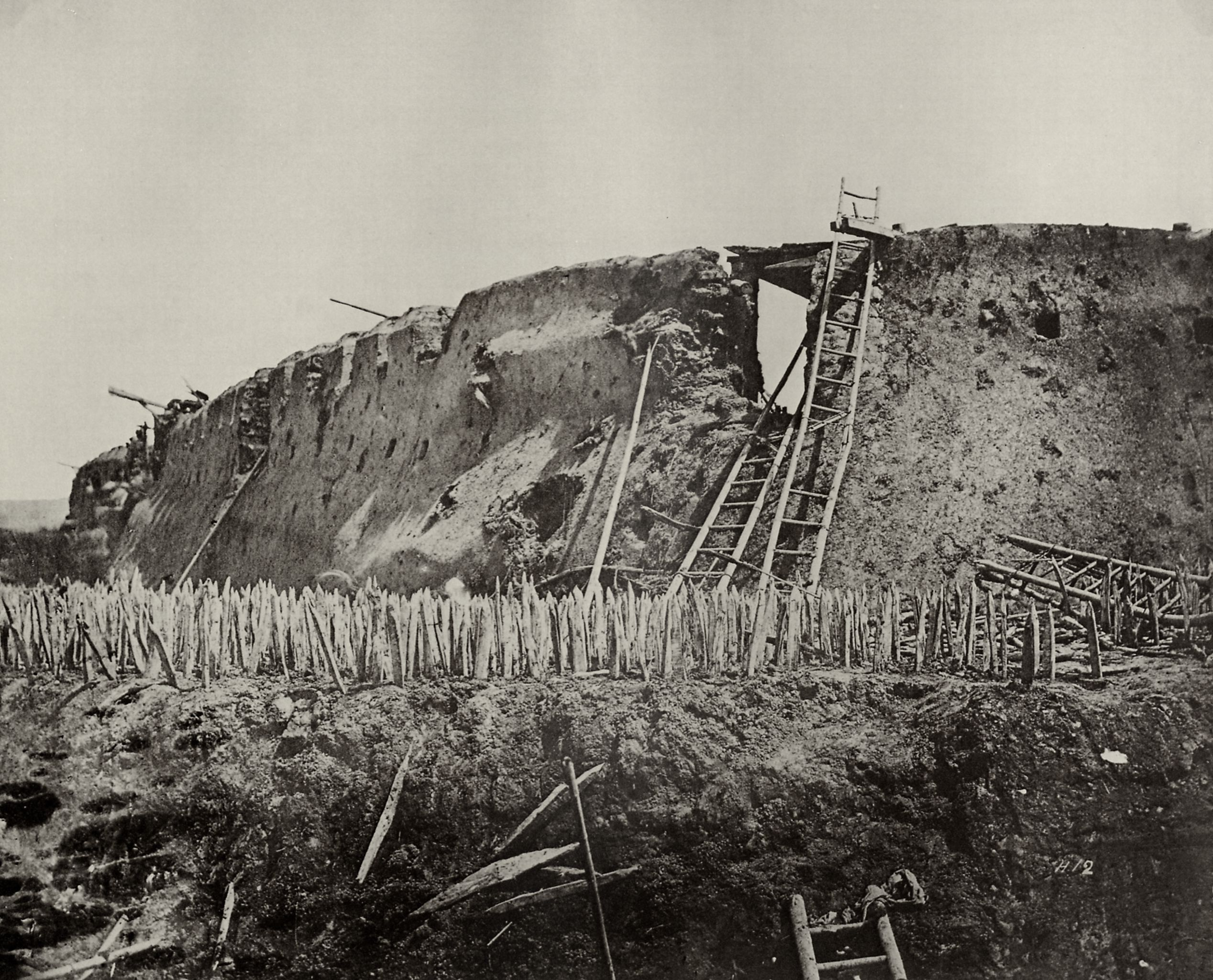
Scaling ladders used by French forces to enter one of the Taku forts

The French had formed a similar unit, the Corps Chinois, of around 1,000 men to support their army. There was frequent conflict between coolies of the two units, possibly because the French coolies were less well paid. During the Battle of Taku Forts, the corps carried supplies and retrieved wounded. While the corps was kept out of the front line in general, the French coolies were employed there, including as supports for ladders held above the water-filled moats while French troops crossed. Major Arthur Agincourt Fisher of the Royal Engineers noted the British corps "served the British faithfully and cheerfully before Canton, and throughout the operations in North China in 1860, they likewise proved invaluable. Their coolness under fire was admirable".

During the later campaign and march on Beijing, desertion from the corps was generally low due to the hostility of the local population and language differences between them and the coolies. One large-scale desertion of 90 coolies took place; the majority were killed by the local people and only six were returned alive to the British by a Chinese magistrate. At one stage, a Qing cavalry patrol captured 12 British coolies. They were returned after having their queues (pigtails) cut off, possibly to prevent them from returning to Chinese territory after the war. Some members of the corps looted from the Chinese and at least one was hanged by the British as a warning.

== Legacy ==
After the war, Temple suggested the corps should be retained and retrained as a combat unit for the garrison at Hong Kong, but it was disbanded. Discussion over such a force continued for decades and came close to being established in 1880 under Charles George Gordon, but opposition from the War Office and Prince George, Duke of Cambridge led to its abandonment. An all-Chinese fighting unit was not formed until 1941, when the Hong Kong Chinese Regiment was established, though individuals served with the British Army and Royal Navy in the meantime.
