= Hong Kong Adventure Corps =

- Active: 1995 – Present
- Country: Hong Kong (1995-1997); Hong Kong (1997-Present)
- Type: Volunteer Youth Organisation
- Role: JLW – Cadet Training; Adventure Training Team – Adventurous Training to Unit(s) and Organization(s)
- Size: 1 wing (9 sabre squadrons)
- Headquarters: High Island Training Camp, Sai Kung Man Yee Road, High Island Reservoir, Sai Kung, Hong Kong
- Motto: Nulli Secundus in Oriente (Second to None in the Orient)
- Colours: Red, Yellow, Blue
- March: Quick – The Leather Bottle
- Website: https://www.hkac.org/en

Commanders
- Commandant: Colonel Ricky KWONG
- Chairman of the Council: Mr Teddy Chung
- Patrons: Anson Chan (until July 2015), Tsang Yam Pui (until July 2015)

The Hong Kong Adventure Corps (Chinese: 香港少年領袖團; Cantonese Yale: Heung Gong Siu Nin Ling zau Tuen) is a voluntary uniformed group subsidised by the Hong Kong government and the Hong Kong Jockey Club. It was created in 1995 by the approval of the then home affairs bureau of the government secretariat for establishment. Like the Hong Kong Sea Cadet Corps and Hong Kong Air Cadet Corps, the HKAC exists to serve the Hong Kong community. The HKAC's values are based in those of the British Army, providing a tough and challenging training with a distinctive military tone of discipline and esprit de corps.

== History ==
Founded in 4 September, the HKAC succeeded the Royal Hong Kong Regiment's Junior Leader Corps (J Corps) in 1995 after the disbandment of the RHKR(V) and its J Corps in the same year. The RHKR(V) J Corps was created in 1971 by then colonial government taking reference from the British Army Cadet Force and Combined Cadet Force, and had the same mission as the current HKAC. The J Corps had a maximum strength of 300 members and was divided into two units: J1 Squadron and J2 Squadron. Unlike the HKAC, which trains both boys and girls, the RHKR J Corps accepted boys only.

"The Ninety Nine" and "The Nine"

The Hong Kong Volunteers in 1854 had its first establishment of 99 Europeans to defend Hong Kong, while the HKAC has its owned cadets of 9 in the first intake of recruits in 1995. This become the Corps' tradition to toast for the Ninety Nine and the Nine after the toast to the people in its Foundation Day Dinner.

== Guidon & Colour ==
Reflecting the nature of light reconnaissance unit of the Corps' predecessor regiment, the Royal Hong Kong Regiment (the Volunteers) which adopted honours and traditions of yeomanry, the Corps received its own guidon presented by the then commissioner of police in 2005. The scarlet swallow tailed guidon is crested with the Corps' "twin dragon" coat of arms surrounded by tudor style rose and thisle in the middle with the motto and the year of establishment embraided down below like the battle honour awarded "Hong Kong" of the regiment's guidon. When paraded or being trooped, guidon is carried by an adult or cadet warrant officer being commanded by senior warrant officer of the Corps, 2 adult or cadet senior non-commissioned officer next to the guidon will be escorting the guidon. Guidon will also be uncased and exhibited at the occasion of foundation day dinner of the Corps.

Before receiving the guidon, colour were being recognized by Corps member as the symbolic rallying point, the colour is crested with the logo of the Corps at Centre with the colour of red on top, yellow in the middle and blue at the bottom.

Colour are often used for formal occasion nowadays while guidon is used during ceremonial occasion only.

== Training ==
The HKAC is an army-orientated and disciplined youth organisation that aims to promote qualities of responsibility, self-reliance, resourcefulness, endurance, perseverance and a sense of service to the community, as well as developing its cadets' leadership and social awareness. The Corps is now an Operating Authority of the Hong Kong Award for Young People (the then the Duke of Edinburgh's Award in Hong Kong) (DEA).

The training facilities and Corps Headquarters is located in High Island, Sai Kung District, and was given to the Corps by the Hong Kong Government. The facility was formerly a British army camp. Another training camp, also located in High Island nearby, was formerly a staff quarters of correctional facility detaining Vietnamese refugees.

Among its members, the HKAC aims to provide:

- Challenges to stimulate potential
- Discipline to cultivate autonomy
- Demand to initiate growth

Training activities at the camp include:

- General/Basic training
- Drill & Parade
- Fitness & Adventure training, including abseiling tower and climbing wall, high event challenge course and obstacle course
- Field-crafts
- Indoor Air Rifles Shooting Programme

Field Training activities like tactics, night walk and camp craft are always conducted in the countryside nearby. Chong Hing (High Island) Water Sports Centre are often used by sabre unit for water sports activities.

Band provides marching band training to its member.

Cadet may also take part in a wide range of ceremonial activities by joining the guard of honour.

Unit training also proceeded in those schools with an affiliation to the Corps.

In the period from 1995 to 2009, former British Forces Camp, the Burma Lines Camp in Queen's Hill, Faniling were also used for training.

== Organisation ==
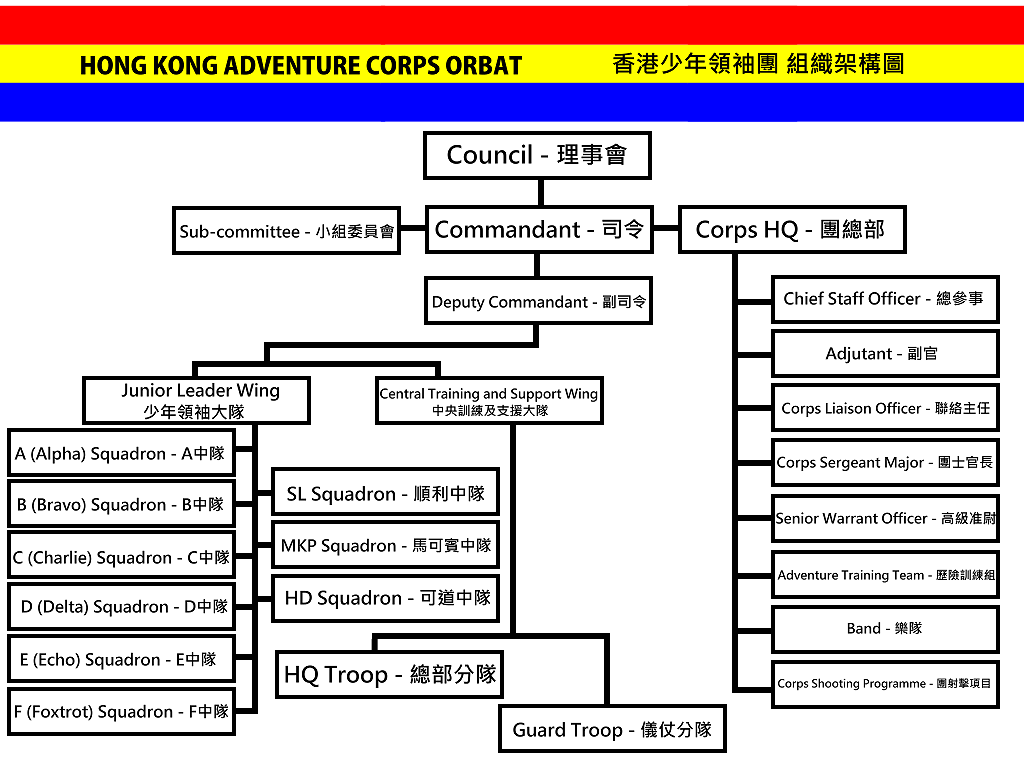
The organisation chart of the Corps.

CHQ/Council

- Chairman of Council and Honorary Commandant – Mr Teddy Chung
- Commandant – Colonel Ricky Kwong
- Deputy Commandant (Operations & Training) – Lieutenant Colonel Simon Ma
- Deputy Commandant (Support & Development) – Lieutenant Colonel YH Ng
- Chief staff Officer – Lieutenant Colonel Patrick Chan
- Adjutant – Captain - KO Au
- Corps Liaison Officer – Major Charlie Lee
- Corps Sergeant Major – WO1 CC Lee
- Senior Warrant Officer – WO1 YH Chan

Junior Leader Wing (Under DC(O&T)) In active service

- OC A Squadron – Major Bonny Tam
- OC B Squadron – Captain KF Lam
- OC C Squadron – Major Teddy Chiu
- OC D Squadron – Major YH Ng
- OC E Squadron – Major CM Li
- OC H Squadron – Major Taurus Yip
- OC S Squadron – Captain SW Sin
- OC YC Squadron – Captain Mark Mooney

Dissolved/Agglomerated Unit

MKP Squadron, school unit Ma Ko Pan Memorial College

F Squadron, target youth of parents whom are disciplined service personnel

Training Squadron, provides centralized Recruit Training

SL Squadron, school unit Shun Lee Catholic Secondary School

Headquarter Units (Under DC(S&D))

- OC Adventure Training Team – Captain SF Kwan
- OC Central Training Team – Major Banny Owen
- OC Corps Communications Team – Major Charlie Lee
- OC Medical Troop – Major Danny Wong
- OC Signal Troop – Captain LS Chan
- TA Corps Shooting Programme - Captain SK Fok
- BSM Band – WO2 CL Tong

== Ranks ==
=== Officers ===
Type	Officers						
Rank	Colonel	Lieutenant Colonel	Major	Captain	Lieutenant	Second Lieutenant	Officer Cadet
Abbreviation	Col	Lt Col	Maj	Capt	Lt	2Lt	OCdt
Insignia							

=== Other Ranks (Adult members) ===
Type	Instructors and WOs					
Rank	Warrant Officer Class 1	Warrant Officer Class 2	Staff Sergeant	Sergeant	Corporal	Instructor
Abbreviation	WO1	WO2	SSgt	Sgt	Cpl	Instr
Insignia						

=== Other Ranks (Cadets) ===
Type		Cadet SNCOs and JNCOs/Cadets				
Rank	Cadet Warrant Officer Class 2	Cadet Staff Sergeant	Cadet Sergeant	Cadet Corporal	Cadet Lance Corporal	Cadet
Abbreviation	CWO2	C/SSgt	C/Sgt	C/Cpl	C/LCpl	Cdt
Insignia						

== Qualifications ==
The age range for joining the HKAC is between 11 and 21, and new members are given the rank of Recruit. Recruits who attain sufficient training are qualified to the rank of Cadet after a Passing Out Parade. Cadets may be promoted to the following ranks:

- Cadet Lance Corporal
- Cadet Corporal
- Cadet Sergeant
- Cadet Staff Sergeant
- Cadet Warrant Officer Class Two

The Junior Dragon Squadron (JDS) was established in 2014, it recruits children aged 9 or above and has less physical requirements than normal army cadets. When members of the JDS reach 11, they have the choice to become recruits and received further training from the sabre unit.

Besides the rank system, the Corps also has a skill qualification system that recognises the skills of its members, and awards badges regardless of rank. These badges can be worn on a brassard while in uniform. The available badges are:

- First Aider Badge (Badge holder must be the 'trained person' stated in the HK Laws Cap. 509 Occupational and Safety Ordinance)
- Guard of Honour Badge
- Marksman Badge (Air rifles)
- Marksman Badge (Full-bore)
- Bandsman Badge
- HKAYP Award Badge
- Level Achievement Badge

== Uniform ==
The HKAC dress uniform is similar to the British Army dress uniform. Inheriting the tradition from its parent regiment, the Royal Hong Kong Regiment, there are some slight differences between uniforms worn by the Army and Corps members.

The HKAC badge is similar to the badge of the Royal Hong Kong Regiment, with two dragons facing each other. The crown in the badge was replaced by a bauhinia after the 1997 handover.

HKAC members cannot wear their uniform when:

- Engaging in a paid employment not associated with HKAC.
- Engaging in political activities.
- Participating in sports events (unless authorised by HKAC).

Cadet must wear their beret/headgear at any time, except when:

- Sitting
- Eating or Drinking
- At work and on board public transport
- In a hangar

=== Ceremonial Dress ===
By tradition, cadet members wear this dress with dark blue berets as their headgear, while adult members wear the No.1 Cap. Scarlet Red Sash is worn by all Senior Non-commissioned Officers (Sergeant or above). WO1s and Officers will wear the Sam Browne belt and carry the pattern 1897 infantry officer's sword when necessary; the Corps Sergeant Major and Senior Warrant Officer will also carry a regulation pattern Pace Stick as part of thieir uniform. Other ranks will not carry bayonet frogs (a pouch at the back of the belt for holding the bayonet) and will not mount bayonets onto their arms.

Some Non-commissioned officers will choose to wear Ammo Boots while Officers will wear George boots with spurs mounted or Oxford-style parade shoes.

=== Field Dress ===
Since the Corps was a sub-unit of Royal Hong Kong Regiment, DPM is adopted as field dress by the Corps. Dark blue berets with red flash (for cadet members) and green flash (for adult members) are worn as headdress. Jungle hats can be worn in field with authorisations from the unit commander.

Adult members who had military force service experiences might own sets of No.9 uniform, issued by both RHKR(V) and HKMSC. Others may buy DPM field dress themselves. Cadet members wear a pair of Olive Green lightweight trousers instead of DPM lightweight trousers. Combat Soldier 95 (CS95) shirts were restricted by the Corps as the system adopt shoulder straps rank slides instead of epaulettes. However, some members modified the shirts, putting epaulettes tapes onto the uniform to meet the standard of the Corps. Also, olive-green brassards used by Regular Army in early-1980s are adopted by the Corps, instead of rank patches used in late-1980s and early-1990s.

=== Mess Dress ===
Mess Dress is only available for adult members. Female members wear black mess jackets and black evening dresses, which is specially designed, unlike the "cavalry style" jacket adopted by the Regular Army.

=== General Service (GS)/Barrack Dress ===
Khaki long-sleeved shirt is worn by all members when they are in GS/ Barrack Dress. In summer time, sleeves are rolled up above elbow level. In winter time, olive-green pullovers or Combat Smock jackets can be worn, based on the orders from the commanders.

For GS Dress, olive green lightweight trousers are worn with high-leg boots. For Barrack dress, bottle-green barrack trousers (for male members) and skirt (for female members) are worn with Oxford-style parade shoes or ankle boots.

Stable belts or olive green working belts can be worn, based on the orders from the commanders. Cadet members are unauthorised to wear Barrack dress.

=== Service Dress ===
The Corps adopted the Service Dress in FAD (Future Army Dress of British Army) style to the adult members in both officer and other ranks in early 2012 and is now replacing the olive green barrack trousers.

== Equipment ==
The Corps uses equipment handed down after the disbanding of the Royal Hong Kong Regiment in 1995:

- Deactivated L1A1 SLR
- PLCE Webbing System

In addition, a number of M16A3 and L85A1 replica weapons are in the armoury of the Corps, which are used as aids for teaching field-crafts and skill-at-arms.

More recent arms appearing during Remembrance Day activities include what appears to be a QBZ-95.

Two decommissioned Russian BTR-70 APCs confiscated by the Hong Kong Customs and Excise Department in an illegal shipment in 2000 are on display at the High Island Training Camp.

== Fleet ==
The Corps has 8 vehicles in service, all of them are donated by the Hong Kong Jockey Club Charities Trust.

Types of vehicles:

- MPV
- Light Tender
- Middle-sized Tender
- 28 seater Coach

With the grant from the Sir David Trench Fund for Recreation managed by the Culture, Sports and Tourism Bureau, the Corps has replaced two ramshackled rubber boats into a new rigid inflatable boat used for water activities.

== Awards ==
The Hong Kong Adventure Corps issues its own awards to its members that are not a part of the government issued orders, decorations, and medals of Hong Kong. The medals and clasps are modelled after those awarded by the British Army, and a lanyard with the Corps' colours are awarded to members receiving the commandant commendations:

- Hong Kong Cadet Forces Medal for Distinguished Service
- Hong Kong Cadet Forces Medal for Meritorious Service
- First Clasp to the Hong Kong Cadet Forces Medal
- Hong Kong Cadet Forces Medal (for 10 Year Long Service)
- Hong Kong Adventure Corps Commandant Commendation

To celebrate the Silver Jubilee of establishment, the Corps issued its Silver Jubilee Medal to eligible members on 2020.

To encourage members who served the Corps, the Corps provides scholarships to members who received years of training upon being admitted to local universities as full-time students.

== Exchange Trips ==
The HKAC cadets are often visited by army cadets from other countries and they in turn visit cadets in other countries from time to time. The main exchange trip of the HKAC is with Britain's Army Cadet Force.

Cadets are also frequently participated in the mainland cultural exchange activities.

== Recruitment ==
The Corps recruits all year round since late 2017. Before the change, the Corps inducted teenagers aged between 11 and 21 (inclusive) from March to May every year. Selections were conducted before the start of recruit training. The annual Passing Out Parade was held in the following year's April for recruits who pass the Recruit Basic Training Course.

The Corps began receiving online application for cadets and instructor since 2017 and 2018 respectively to cope with society needs.

== See also ==
- Hong Kong Sea Cadet Corps
- Hong Kong Air Cadet Corps
  - Ceremonial Squadron
- Royal Hong Kong Regiment (The Volunteers)
- Cadets (youth program)
