= Hong Kong Sea Cadet Corps =

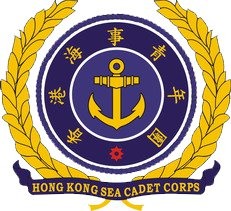
- Hong Kong Sea Cadet Corps badge
- Founded: 16 February 1968
- Allegiance: Hong Kong (1968-1997); Hong Kong (1997-Present)
- Type: Maritime youth charity
- Size: 1800 Cadets and Adult Staff
- Headquarters: Diamond Hill, Kowloon
- Website: http://www.seacadet.org.hk

Commanders
- Captain: Terence Chow
- Commander: Ponthey Yip
- Commander: Leo WONG Cheuk Wai

Hong Kong Sea Cadet Corps is a youth organization based in Hong Kong and formed in 1968 by former Royal Naval Reserve officers by the creation of Hong Kong Law (Hong Kong Sea Cadet Corps Ordinance)

The HKSCC was linked to British Armed Forces' Combined Cadet Force and Sea Cadet Corps. Since the handover in 1997, the HKSCC is mostly a government funded organization and does not have any official links to the People's Liberation Army Navy. It also receives financial support from Hong Kong Jockey Club and The Community Chest of Hong Kong.

Based at Diamond Hill, Kowloon, the 1800-strong HKSCC has 32 training units and two nautical centres (Stanley Bay and Sai Kung).

== Rank & Rates ==
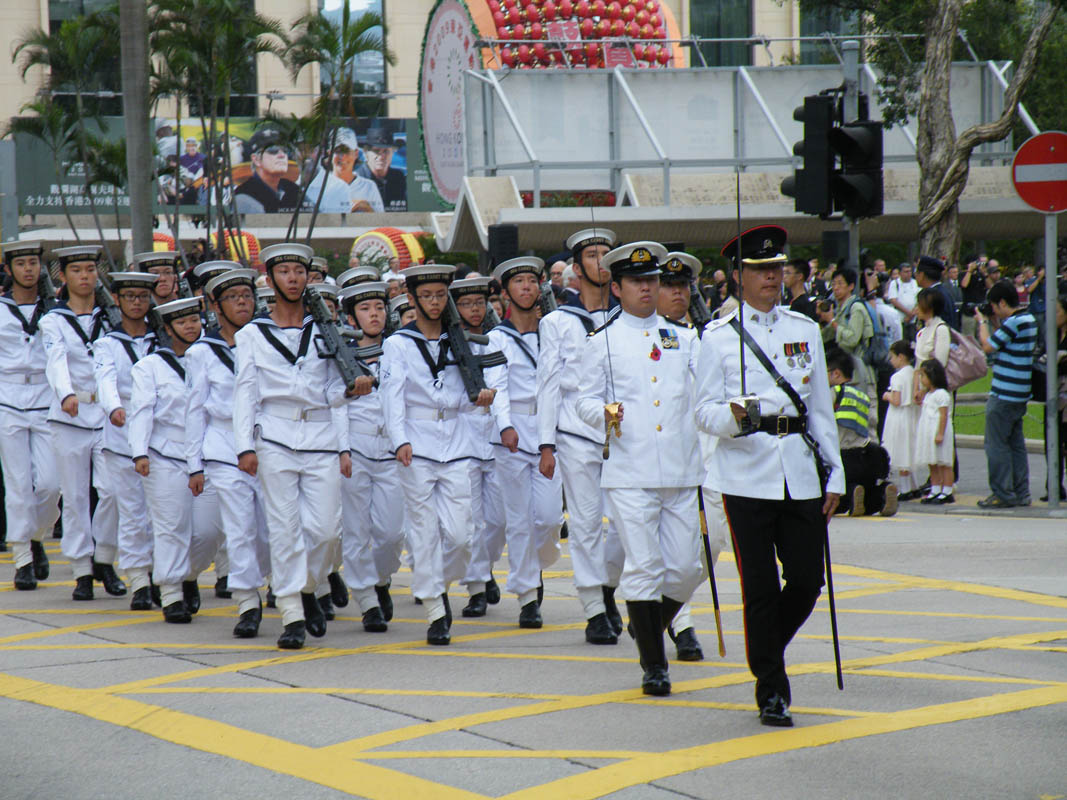
Ceremonial Guard of the HKSCC participating in a parade commemorating the end of World War II

HKSCC adopts the ranking system from the Royal Navy and their Sea Cadets program:

Ranks and Insignia of HKSCC Officers
Rank	Captain (Capt)	Commander (Cdr)	Lieutenant Commander (Lt Cdr)	Lieutenant (Lt)	Sub-Lieutenant (S/Lt)	Midshipman (Mid)
Insignia						

Ranks and Insignia of HKSCC Instructors/ NCO (Non-commissioned Officer)
Rank	Chief Petty Officer (CPO)	Petty Officer (PO)	Acting Petty officer (APO)
Insignia			

Ranks and Insignia HKSCC Junior Rates/ Cadets
Rank	Leading Cadet (LC)	Able Cadet (AC)	Ordinary Cadet (OC)	Junior Cadet (JC)	New Entry (NE)
Insignia					None

== Uniform ==
Officers, instructors and cadets wear dark navy berets (peaked, white caps for the instructors and officers), blue shirts, dark navy blue trousers and black boots named the Action Working Dress (AWD) during routine trainings. Its equivalent is the No.4AWD worn across the Royal Navy.

On occasions of ceremonial duties, parades or other public events they will wear white (No.6) or blue (No.1) dress uniforms in summer and winter respectively, similar to the Royal Navy uniform worn by officers, senior and junior rates.

Source: Uniforms of the Hong Kong Sea Cadet Corps

== Weapons ==
The Hong Kong Sea Cadet Corps Ceremonial Guard parade out with the replica Enfield L85A1/ (known as SA80 in Royal Navy) rifle.

In the past, they drilled with the Lee-Enfield L59A1 Drill Rifle but rarely do so today.

== Facilities ==
Training Ships or TS are land base training units for the HKSCC around the territory. Some are named after Her Majesty's Ships of the Royal Navy.

- TS Ark Royal - named after HMS Ark Royal
- TS Brilliant - named after HMS Brilliant
- TS Cornflower - named after HMS Cornflower
- TS Drake - named after HMS Drake
- TS Eternity
- TS Hero - named after HMS Hero
- TS King Ling
- TS Lightning - named after HMS Lightning
- TS Ma Ko Pan
- TS Mountbatten - named after Lord Louis Mountbatten, Former First Sea Lord of the Royal Navy
- TS Nelson - named after HMS Nelson / Admiral Lord Horatio Nelson
- TS Neptune - named after HMS Neptune
- TS Royalist - named after HMS Royalist
- TS Somerset - named after HMS Somerset
- TS Unicorn - named after HMS Unicorn
- TS York - named after HMS York

Training Centres

- Administration Headquarters, Diamond Hill, Kowloon
- Jubilee Centre, Stanley, Hong Kong Island
- Tang Shiu Kin Nautical Centre, Sai Kung, New Territories

Training Launch

- Supertee

Disbanded Units

- TS Anson - named after HMS Anson
- TS Collingwood - named after HMS Collingwood
- TS Courageous - named after HMS Courageous
- TS Chatham - named after HMS Chatham
- TS Rodney - named after HMS Rodney
- TS Swallow - named after HMS Swallow (P242)
- TS Talent - named after HMS Talent
- TS Victory - named after HMS Victory
- TS Zulu - named after HMS Zulu

== Awards ==
Hong Kong Sea Cadet Corps issues their own awards to their members and are not part of the government issued Orders, decorations, and medals of Hong Kong. The medals and clasps are modelled after the ones awarded by the United Kingdom Ministry of Defence:

- Outstanding Cadet(s) of the Year
- Best Unit of the Year
- Cadet Force Medal (before 1997)
- Hong Kong Sea Cadet Force Medal

== See also ==
- Cadets (youth program)
- Hong Kong Adventure Corps
- Hong Kong Air Cadet Corps
