= Royal Hong Kong Regiment =

Royal Hong Kong Regiment (The Volunteers)
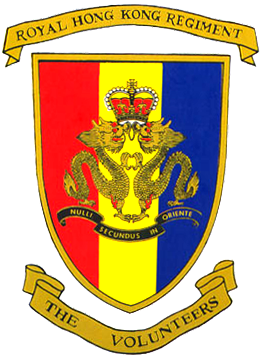
- Coat of arms of the Royal Hong Kong Regiment (The Volunteers)
- Active: 1854–1995
- Country: British Hong Kong
- Branch: British Army
- Type: colonial regiment (part of the Royal Armoured Corps from 1960s)
- Garrison/HQ: Hong Kong Garrison
- Motto: Nulli Secundus in Oriente (Second to None in the East)
Colours
red, yellow, blue
- Anniversaries: 1854, 1971, 1995
- Engagements: Battle of Hong Kong

Royal Hong Kong Regiment
- Traditional Chinese: 皇家香港軍團(義勇軍)
Transcriptions
Yue: Cantonese
- Yale Romanization: Wòhng gāa hēung góng gwān tyùhn (yih yúhng gwān)
- Jyutping: Wong^{4} gaa^{1} heong^{1} gong^{2} gwan^{1} tyun^{4} (ji^{6} jung^{5} gwan^{1})

The Royal Hong Kong Regiment (The Volunteers) (RHKR(V)) (Chinese: 皇家香港軍團(義勇軍)), formed in May 1854, was the only locally raised military unit in British Hong Kong. It was a Crown regiment established by Royal Warrant under the Royal Hong Kong Regiment Ordinance. While funded and locally administered by the Government of Hong Kong, it remained under the command of the Commander British Forces in Hong Kong, and its officers held Queen’s Commissions. From the early 1960s, the Regiment was affiliated to the Royal Armoured Corps and, from 1970, was formally incorporated into its order of battle under subsidiary regulations (L.N. 190 of 1970).

During the Imperial era, home defence units were raised in various British colonies to enable regular army units to be deployed elsewhere. These colonial forces were generally organised along British Army lines. The first locally raised militia in Hong Kong was the Hong Kong Volunteers, a forerunner of what became the Royal Hong Kong Regiment (The Volunteers). Members of this unit fought during the Battle of Hong Kong in 1941, suffering 289 killed or missing in action.

Although locally funded through the colonial government, the Regiment was established as a Crown military body under Royal Warrant and operated under the Army Act 1955 and Queen’s Regulations. It was not part of the United Kingdom’s Territorial Army but formed part of Her Majesty’s Armed Forces for the defence of the Colony. The Regiment was placed under the operational command of the Commander British Forces in Hong Kong and listed within the order of battle of the 48 Gurkha Infantry Brigade.

The Regiment met British military standards in organisation, training, and discipline. Many of its officers and NCOs attended courses with the Royal Armoured Corps in the United Kingdom, including armoured reconnaissance and driving & maintenance training. It operated Ferret scout cars, Land Rover reconnaissance variants, and standard British small arms identical to those used by RAC formations. Some members also served voluntarily on attachment to British Regular and Territorial Army units overseas.

The Regiment was formally disbanded in 1995 prior to the transfer of sovereignty. Its final parade was held at the Gallipoli Lines, Fanling, reviewed by the Governor and the Commander British Forces, who described it as "a proud and honourable chapter of the British Army in Hong Kong." It should not be confused with the separate, short-lived Hong Kong Regiment (1892–1902), which was a regular infantry regiment of the British Army recruited in India.

== History ==
=== The beginning ===
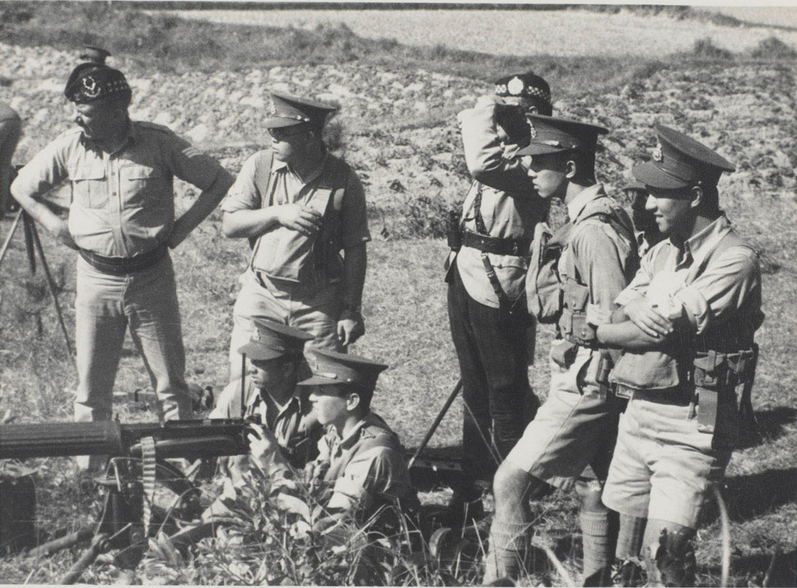
HKVDC soldiers operate a Vickers machine gun in New Territories.

The Hong Kong Volunteers was formed in 1854 when the Crimean War led to a reduction of the British military presence in Hong Kong. To help bolster the defences at a time when marauding pirates were still a hazard on the China coast a call for local volunteers was made. A total of 99 Europeans were recruited, mostly British but with some Portuguese, Scandinavians and Germans also answering the call. However almost as soon as it was founded, it was disbanded when the threat of war in Europe receded, and Regular units of the British Army were once again able to resume responsibility for the security of Hong Kong.

In 1862, the Hong Kong Volunteers was re-established, and in 1864 they were called out to help subdue a serious outbreak of rioting between British and Indian soldiers. In 1866 it was disbanded again. In 1878, the Hong Kong Volunteers was reborn as the "Hong Kong Artillery and Rifle Volunteer Corps". By 1917, it was renamed as the "Hong Kong Defence Corps" was actively engaged in guard and patrol duties during World War I when, owing to the recall of the British forces, they were the only military unit left in Hong Kong.

In 1933, the Hong Kong Defence Corps acquired their first armoured car, equipped with an armour-plated body and mountings for two machine-guns. Later, four others were bought by the colonial government. The bodywork was outfitted by the Hong Kong and Whampoa Dock Company. These armoured cars played an important role in the Battle of Hong Kong in December 1941.

=== World War II ===
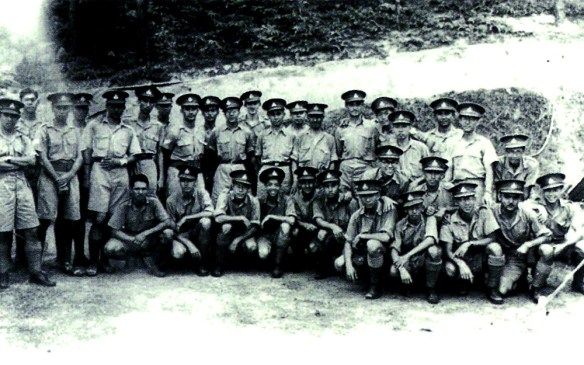
The 3rd company of Hong Kong Volunteer Defence Corps. Most of them died on 19 December 1941 in Wong Nai Chung Gap, the day that inflicted most casualties during the Battle of Hong Kong.

The Hong Kong Defence Corps, renamed the Hong Kong Volunteer Defence Corps (HKVDC), met their severest test in the bitter fighting that took place in the crucial weeks before the fall of Hong Kong on Christmas Day 1941. On 8 December 1941, the HKVDC, deployed a total fighting strength of 2200 all ranks in seven infantry companies, five artillery batteries, five machine gun companies equipped with Vickers machine gun and an armoured car platoon.

While only seeing light action in the New Territories at the beginning of the Japanese attack, the Volunteers were heavily engaged on Hong Kong Island, especially during the key battles of Wong Nai Chung Gap and Stanley. Casualties among 3 Coy at the former, and 1 Bty at the latter, were extremely heavy. 1 and 2 (Scottish) companies also suffered heavy losses, as did 5 Bty.

Out of the mobilised strength of 2200, 289 were listed either as missing or killed, and many others became prisoners of war. Some, however, made their way into China where the British Army Aid Group was formed to assist the Chinese Government in the struggle against the Japanese. A number of these men later joined the Hong Kong Volunteer Company in Burma, where they were attached to the Chindits under General Orde Wingate. The services of the defence corps were later recognised by the award of 19 decorations and 18 mentioned in despatch for gallantry and good service. As a recognition of The Hong Kong Volunteer Defence Corps defence of Hong Kong during 1941, the Corps was awarded the battle honour "Hong Kong".

The colours of the Hong Kong Volunteer Defence Corps was put under the care of Lt. Ralph James Shrigley who buried the colours during the battle near the Fortress HQ of the regiment to prevent their capture by Japanese forces. Lt. Shrigley was later captured on the 25 December 1941 and was transferred to "Camp S" as a prisoner of war before killing himself on the 28 June 1944 to prevent further mistreatment by the Kempetai looking for the colours. The burial place was later found in 1957 but the flags had already deteriorated leaving only the poles.

=== Post-WWII ===
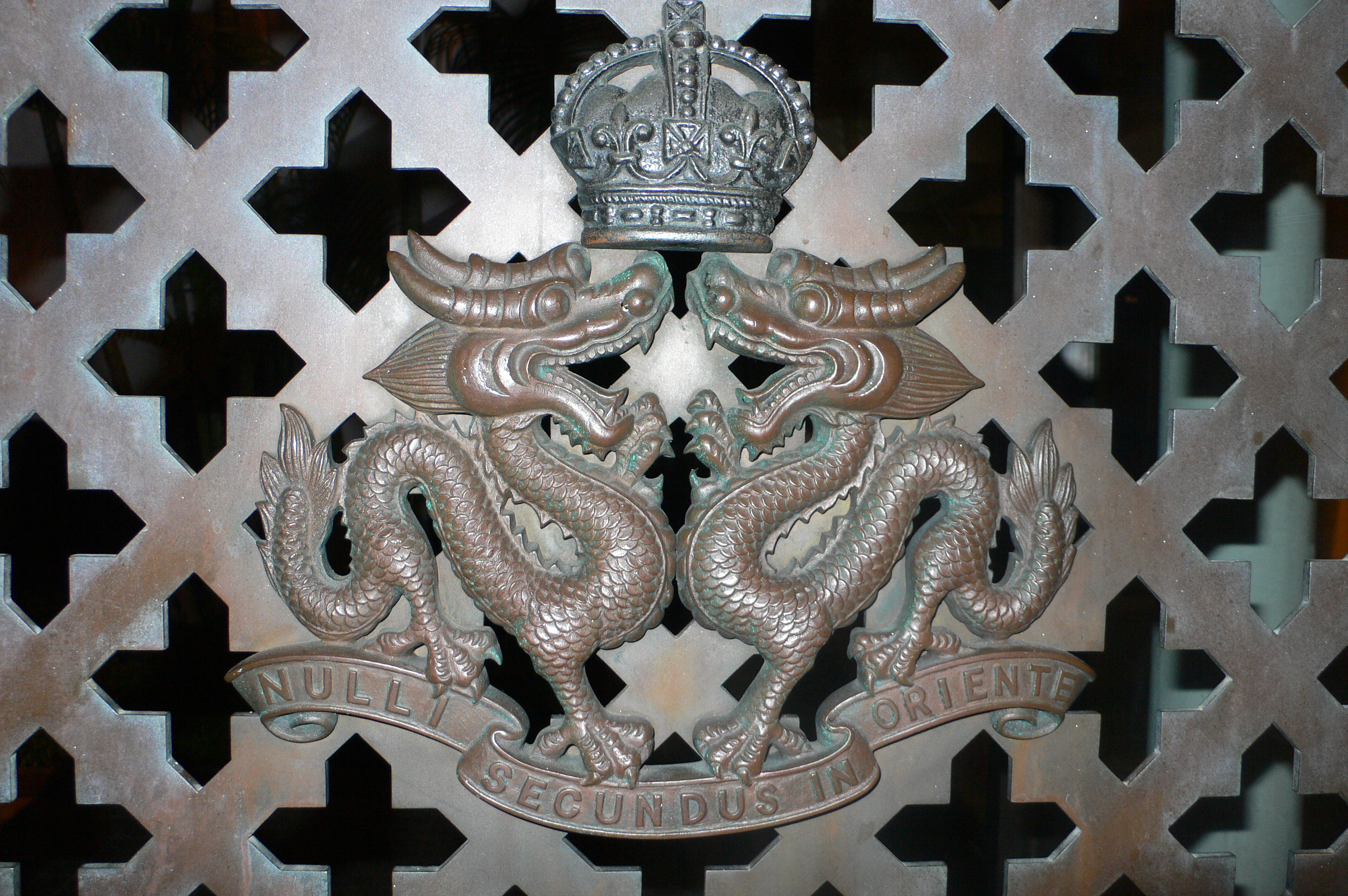
The coat of arms of the RHKR(V) with its Latin motto which means "Second to none in the orient".

In 1949, The Hong Kong Regiment were reorganised and became part of the Hong Kong Defence Force, which also included separate air and naval units. In 1951 the new combined defence force was granted the title 'Royal', and replacement colours were entrusted to the care of the regiment as successor to the defunct Defence Corps.

In the early 1960s, the role of the Royal Hong Kong Defence Force changed from that of an infantry battalion to a reconnaissance regiment equipped with six British Ferret armoured cars (each armed with Browning .30-inch machine-gun) that were acquired. The regiment was reorganised to form a headquarters, headquarters squadron, three reconnaissance squadrons, an infantry company and a home guard company. During the 1967 leftist riots, the Royal Hong Kong Defence Force were called out during the six-month disturbances in Hong Kong. The RHKR assisted in establishing the Junior Leaders Corps on 22 December 1969.

By 1970, the naval unit was phased out and in 1970 the Royal Hong Kong Defence Force was itself disbanded – the two remaining member units, the Hong Kong Regiment and the Hong Kong Auxiliary Air Force, officially becoming separate entities. At the same time, both were granted the 'Royal' title by Queen Elizabeth II, and the words 'The Volunteers' were incorporated into the Hong Kong Regiment's title. With its new title and colours, the RHKR(V) was reorganised as a light reconnaissance unit operating under the command of the British Forces Overseas Hong Kong.

In the late 1970s the Volunteers were deployed to assist the civil powers over the problem of illegal immigration from China; as the problem grew from 1980 till 1992 the Volunteers were deployed to man the defences of the Chinese-Hong Kong border. In the late 1980s to early 1990s the Volunteers were deployed to support the colonial government in controlling the flood of Vietnamese illegal migrants, commonly known as the "Boat People". This included guarding temporary detention camps for Vietnamese migrants.

=== Disbandment ===
The Sino-British Joint Declaration on the question of Hong Kong as a British colony was finalised and signed in Beijing on 19 December 1984. On 27 May 1985, instruments of ratification were exchanged and the agreement entered into force. It was registered at the United Nations by the British and Chinese governments on 12 June 1985.

In April 1992, the Security Branch of the Hong Kong Government formally announced that the regiment would disband in September 1995. The RHKR was officially disbanded on 3 September 1995. At the time of disbandment, the Royal Armoured Corps sent a message of appreciation, stating that it had been honoured to count the Royal Hong Kong Regiment within its order of battle for 34 years.

== Commanding Officers ==
- Lt Col K B L Simson April 1993-3rd September 1995

The Royal Hong Kong Regiment (The Volunteers) Association was created in 1995 as a charitable organization to support former members in Hong Kong with a Club House located at the Hong Kong Jockey Club Happy Valley Racecourse.

== Successive changes of titles ==
- 1854 – Hong Kong Volunteers
- 1878 – Hong Kong Artillery and Rifle Volunteer Corps
- 1917 – Hong Kong Defence Corps
- 1920 – Hong Kong Volunteer Defence Corps
- 1949 – Hong Kong Defence Force
- 1951 – Royal Hong Kong Defence Force
- 1961 – Hong Kong Regiment (The Volunteers)
- 1970 – Royal Hong Kong Regiment (The Volunteers)

== Organisation ==
The regiment included several units:

- Regimental Headquarters
- Headquarters Squadron
- A, B, C and D Sabre Squadrons
- Regimental Police
- Home Guard Squadron
- Training Squadron
- Band
- Junior Leader Corps - 'J Corps' was a youth organisation created by the RHKR(V) in 1971 and now renamed Hong Kong Adventure Corps.

== Equipment ==
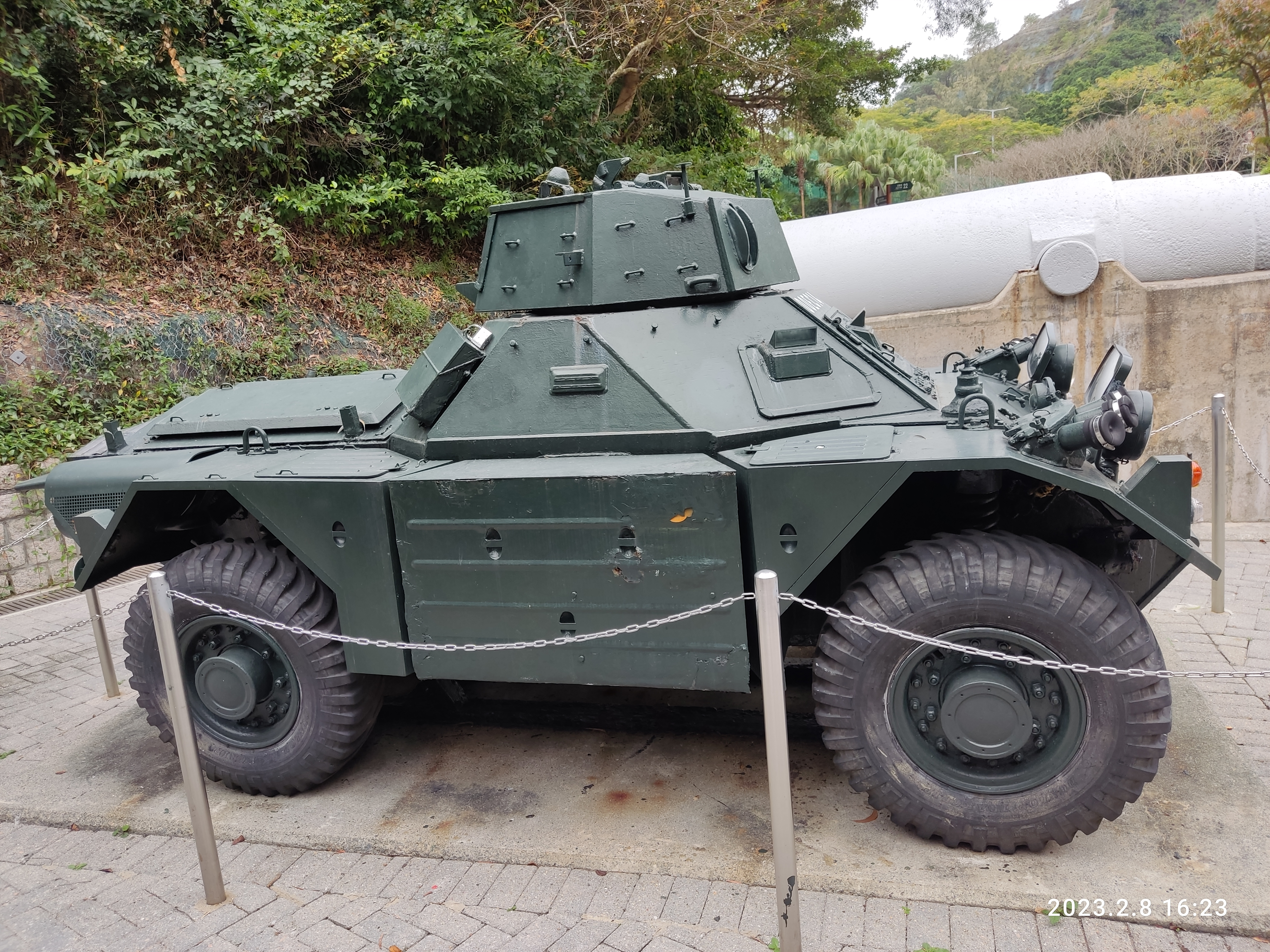
A Ferret scout car that was used by the Royal Hong Kong Regiment

=== Vehicles ===
List of vehicles used by regiment prior to disbanding:

==== 1925-65 ====
- one armoured car on Ford chassis with Vickers MG 1920s for Mounted Infantry Company
- one armoured car on Dennis chassis 1925 - modified by Hong Kong & Whampoa Dock for Mounted Infantry Company
- two armoured cars on Thornycroft chassis 1930-1933 - built by Hong Kong & Whampoa Dock
- motorcycles with Vickers machine guns
- four armoured cars on Bedford chassis 1940-1941 - built by Kowloon-Canton Railway Corporation

==== 1965-95 ====
- six Ferret scout cars 1963
- two Land Rovers
- Land Rover Defender - from British Army units station in Hong Kong during 1970s to 1990s

=== Weapons ===
List of small arms used by the RHKR prior to disbanding:

- Lee–Enfield No.4 MkI rifle
- L1A1 Self-Loading Rifle
- Colt M16A2 rifle
- Colt "Commando" M177 Assault Carbine
- SA80 L85
- Sterling submachine gun (SMG) 9mm L2A
- FN MAG General-purpose machine gun (GPMG)
- Bren LMG
- M1919 Browning machine gun
- Remington Model 870 Shotgun
- Browning Hi-Power

== Badge ==
The regiment's badge at disbandment consisted of:

- St. Edward's Crown
- Two Chinese dragons as supporters, but without a crest
- Motto: Nulli Secundus in Oriente

Earlier badges had a Tudor Crown and the Volunteer Corps had no Oriental features:

- Tudor Crown
- Ribbon with the regimental name
- Coat of Arms of the United Kingdom within the ribbon
- Motto: Nulli Secundus in Oriente
- Laurel wreath

== Colours and Guidons ==
King's Colour of the Hong Kong Volunteer Defence Corps (HKVDC). Used as stand in for the Hong Kong Defence Force

Regimental Colour of the Hong Kong Volunteer Defence Corps (HKVDC). Used as stand in for the Hong Kong Defence Force

Camp flag of the Royal Hong Kong Regiment (The Volunteers) (RHKR)

Regimental Guidon of the Royal Hong Kong Regiment (The Volunteers) (RHKR)

== See also ==
- British Army Aid Group
- Hong Kong Adventure Corps
- Hong Kong Air Cadet Corps
- Hong Kong Sea Cadet Corps
- Hong Kong Chinese Regiment
- Hong Kong Volunteer Company
- Royal Hong Kong Auxiliary Air Force
- Hong Kong Military Service Corps
