= HMS Talent =

Three submarines of the British Royal Navy have been named HMS Talent:

- HMS Talent (P322), a T-class submarine transferred to the Royal Netherlands Navy as HNLMS Zwaardvisch in 1943.
- HMS Talent was another T-class submarine, ordered in 1944, but cancelled in 1945.
- HMS Talent (P337) was another T-class submarine, previously named HMS Tasman but renamed shortly before commissioning in 1945. She served until 1966.
- HMS Talent (S92), a Trafalgar-class submarine launched in 1988 and decommissioned in 2022
