= British Army Aid Group =

- 英軍服務團
- Active: 1942–1945
- Country: British Hong Kong
- Allegiance: British Army; Allies
- Type: Para-military

British Army Aid Group
- Traditional Chinese: 英軍服務團
- Yale Romanization: Yīng gwān Fuhk mouh Tyùhn
- Jyutping: Jing^{1} gwan^{1} Fuk^{6} mou^{6} Tyun^{4}

The British Army Aid Group (B.A.A.G.) was a paramilitary organisation for British and Allied forces in southern China during the Second World War. The B.A.A.G. was officially classified in the British Army's order of battle as an MI9 unit that was responsible for assisting prisoners of war and internees to escape from the Imperial Japanese Army's camps.

== History ==
=== Background ===
After the Battle of Hong Kong, Lt. Colonel Sir Lindsay Ride, who was then a professor of Physiology at The University of Hong Kong, was captured. Before the end of the battle, he had been the commander of the Hong Kong Voluntary Defence Corps (H.K.V.D.C.) Field Ambulance, and, once hostilities commenced, was given command of the Combined Field Ambulance. Shortly after being captured, Ride escaped from Sham Shui Po POW camp to China with three trusted men. There, in order to further the war effort, support the Chinese, and shore up damaged British prestige in the area, he suggested forming a group that became known as the British Army Aid Group, which under the cover of acting as a humanitarian aid organisation, would help prisoners of war and internees to escape and at the same time, gather intelligence to further the war effort in the region. The idea was approved by General Archibald Wavell, the Commander-in-Chief, India, and with the agreement of the War Office in London, the new unit was incorporated into the structure of MI9, the Military Intelligence department responsible for support to resistance movements and POW escapes. Ride was appointed the MI9 representative in China and Commandant of the new group. A headquarters was established at Qiujiang in Guangdong Province, while a forward operating base was set up at Huizhou. The group became operational on 6 June 1942.

=== Service ===
The officers of the B.A.A.G. were mainly European men with a Hong Kong connection, and the operative agents were mostly local Hong Kong men and women who offered their services, often at great risk, in occupied Hong Kong and outside, in the fight for the restoration of their home and freedom. Due to concern about the number of Indian Army prisoners of war who were being recruited into the Japanese-sponsored Indian National Army, an Indian Section of the B.A.A.G. was established at Guilin under the command of Major Dinesh Misra, who had previously served in Hong Kong with the Rajputana Rifles. An imprisoned Indian officer, Captain Mateen Ansari, was executed by the Japanese for assisting the B.A.A.G. and was later awarded the George Cross.

Throughout the war the B.A.A.G. sent agents to gather intelligence – military, political and economic – about conditions in both Hong Kong and southern China. One important role was the provision of weather reports to the China Air Task Force of the United States Army Air Forces, who reciprocated by dropping medical supplies into the camps during raids. The agents' main role was to facilitate the escape of prisoners from Hong Kong; British, Commonwealth and Indian servicemen were then debriefed by B.A.A.G. staff and many subsequently rejoined the war effort. Many escaped Hong Kong Chinese joined the Hong Kong Volunteer Company, a unit formed by Ride which went on to fight in the Burma Campaign. The B.A.A.G. also gave medical and humanitarian assistance to civilians and military personnel in Southern China; the group's hospital gave medical treatment to some 30,000 Chinese annually. and during a famine in 1943, fed up to 6,000 people daily.

The B.A.A.G. continued its work after the Surrender of Japan and was finally disbanded on 31 December 1945. At the end of the war, Ride commissioned a formation patch for the group, depicting a scarlet pimpernel flower, after the hero of The Scarlet Pimpernel novels who helped prisoners escape from the French Revolution, but the badge was never officially recognised.

The various roles played by the B.A.A.G. during the war and following the end of the Japanese occupation of Hong Kong in August 1945 were summed up in an editorial published in The South China Morning Post in early 1946:

At the close of the year, Colonel L.T. Ride said good-bye to the men and women who have worked under him, in the British Army Aid Group, and this leave-taking marked the official end of an organisation that Hong Kong cannot allow to die. Tired memories still recall the desolation that overwhelmed us at the surrender. Then, recovering, for a time we toughened again, sure that the Allies would return very soon. Then hopelessness again, lapsing into despair. We came to regard ourselves a little bitterly as the forgotten folk—until we learned of the B.A.A.G. and the British Consul at Macao. There, miraculously, were friends, rallying round, beckoning us, assuring, us, impatient at times, no doubt, at the slowness of our response, venturing dangerously close, planning, providing, infiltrating at much risk—a resurgence and a rescue service almost without parallel. We did not know them then as the B.A.A.G. It was sufficient to know that Hong Kong men were on the perimeter, that we had not been abandoned at all: and thousands who were able to get away have full cause for gratitude to the B.A.A.G. for ready, generous and efficient help.

The work done by the B.A.A.G. was very varied, ranging from espionage organisation, and other contact-making, to the assistance of refugees and displaced persons, conveyance of news to anxious relatives and friends, and even including “scorched earth” service when the enemy invaded the interior bases. The B.A.A.G. was so well organised and so well served that the knowledge abroad of conditions in Hong Kong was remarkably accurate and up-to-date. Though in conventional sense not a combat unit, its work, in the advanced sections, was highly dangerous. It is known now that many of its messengers and its agents in Hong Kong were caught and savagely put to torture and death. Their names will live in our minds and hearts; and when the full story of the B.A.A.G. is written its roll of honour will be a tablet to treasure. In its leader the Hong Kong unit was fortunate. Able, familiar with the Colony, and blessed with personality. Colonel Ride was a most appropriate choice. He is also well qualified to be the official historian, and his book will be awaited with keenest interest.

To this Colony the essential virtue of our part of the B.A.A.G. is that it was Hong Kong. There is rivalry between interned and non-interned as to which section was the custodian of the Hong Kong spiritual relics. If there were during the occupation two Kong Kongs marooned here, there was a third Hong Kong outside—another Hong Kong fretting, worrying and grieving. Nor did its work cease abruptly with the war’s end: for four months the personnel have been here helping to mop up the post-war problems, dealing sympathetically with a host of domestic wants and participating in the avenging of unnecessary sufferings. The unit’s record of service is one for Hong Kong’s pride as well as its gratitude. There is another aspect which should not be overlooked. It is an old taunt that Kong Kong is not China and knows little of China. The Hong Kong folk who escaped, and those who returned from elsewhere to work with the B.A.A.G., have in appreciable degree removed that blemish. They now know China. They laboured in close association with the real Chinese, reaching understanding. They return as an embassy, and they have a further service to perform in educating Hong Kong to a more co-operative conception of things Chinese. It will be a great pity if the B.A.A.G. should be completely dispersed: it has earned its shrine of remembrance and there is still work that it could do.

== See also ==
- British Forces Overseas Hong Kong
- Hong Kong Chinese Regiment
- Hong Kong Volunteer Company
