= HMS Somerset =

Four ships of the Royal Navy have borne the name HMS Somerset:

- HMS Somerset (1698), a third rate of 1698
- HMS Somerset (1731), a third rate of 1731
- HMS Somerset (1748), a third rate of 1748
- HMS Somerset (F82), a Type 23 frigate launched in 1994

== Battle honours ==
Ships named Somerset have earned the following battle honours:

- Vigo 1702
- Velez Malaga 1704
- Louisburg 1758
- Quebec 1759
