= Hong Kong Volunteer Company =

- 香港志願連
- Active: 1943–1945
- Country: British Hong Kong
- Engagements: Burma Campaign

Hong Kong Volunteer Company (Chinese: 香港志願連) was a company of British-Chinese soldiers that escaped Japanese occupied Hong Kong, and served with the British in India and Burma during the Burma Campaign of World War II.

== History ==
Following the surrender of Hong Kong in December 1941, several British-Chinese soldiers made their escape to Free China, and subsequently volunteered to go to India to join the British Army and fight the Japanese. The volunteer company was initially made up of 128 Chinese members of the Hong Kong Volunteer Defence Corp, 49 Chinese members of the British Army, as well as several members from the Air Transport Auxiliary, Air Raid Precautions, and other personnel that escaped from Japanese occupied Hong Kong to overseas. Escapees were assisted by the British Army Aid Group, and transported to Assam, and then to Calcutta by the Royal Air Force.

Lieutenant Colonel Mike Calvert, a British officer who previously commanded local sappers in Hong Kong before 1941, called for volunteers from the escapees to serve with the Chindits. By February 1943, the Hong Kong Volunteer Company was put into service with the Chindits in Burma. They were later deployed to Japanese-occupied Malaya conducting special reconnaissance behind enemy lines.

== See also ==
- Hong Kong Chinese Regiment
- Royal Hong Kong Regiment
