= Hong Kong Chinese Regiment =

- Active: November 1941–December 1941
- Country: British Hong Kong
- Branch: British Army
- Type: Machine gun battalion
- Size: One battalion authorized
- Motto(s): 保衛蘆舍 (Protecting One's Home)
- Engagements: Battle of Hong Kong

Commanders
- Notable commanders: Major H. W. Mayer (or Rodney W. Mayer, CO)

The Hong Kong Chinese Regiment (HKCR) was a regiment that was raised by the British Army shortly before the Battle of Hong Kong during World War II.

== History ==
The idea of recruiting more local Hong Kong Chinese for the defence of the colony began as early as 1936, with the number of Chinese sappers employed by the British increasing to 250. With the outbreak of the Second Sino-Japanese War in the following year, the British recruited 250 Hong Kong Chinese gunners to support British artillery units based in Hong Kong. By 1941, Chinese gunners and sappers were dispersed throughout the various units in Hong Kong.

In November 1941, a month before the Japanese invasion of Hong Kong, the War Office agreed to form the Hong Kong Chinese Regiment, a battalion-sized military unit. Believing it was necessary to recruit a solid core of potential NCOs, and train them up using experienced officers and non-commissioned officers (NCOs) to the point where the regiment's first battalion could be built. The battalion was originally intended as a machine gun battalion similar to the 1st Middlesex Regiment, whose officers were providing the training cadre for the regiment. However, by the time the Battle of Hong Kong broke out, only a platoon-sized group had completed training.

The majority of the initial high-quality recruits (mainly from the New Territories) were passed medically by Dr. Scriven, and training was progressing well until interrupted by the Japanese attack. During the fighting, the HKCR was primarily used to guard military stores in Deep Water Bay, and also saw action at the ridge that resulted in several casualties.

After the surrender, several HKCR recruits escaped to China and joined up with the British Army Aid Group or the Hong Kong Volunteer Company shortly after. Others became POWs, but, like all POWs considered 'local Chinese' by the Japanese, they were released early, resulting in many of these highly motivated young men crossing the border. As a percentage, more HKCR men probably escaped, or evaded capture, and continued fighting than any other Hong Kong-based unit, thus proving the quality of the initial recruitment and selection.

== See also ==
- Royal Hong Kong Regiment
