= Remembrance Day =

Day honouring war military casualties

- A wreath of remembrance poppies being laid in front of a memorial during a Remembrance Day ceremony
- Also called: Poppy Day
- Observed by: Primarily countries in the Commonwealth of Nations
- Type: International
- Significance: Commemorates war dead
- Observances: Parades, silences
- Date: 11 November
- Next time: 11 November 2027
- Frequency: Annual
- Related to: Armistice Day, Anzac Day, Memorial Day, National Unity and Armed Forces Day, Veterans Day, Remembrance Sunday

Remembrance Day (also known as Poppy Day owing to the tradition of wearing a remembrance poppy) is a memorial day observed in former countries of the British Empire and current Commonwealth member states since the end of the First World War, to honour armed forces members who have died in the line of duty. The day is also marked by war remembrances in several other non-Commonwealth countries. In most countries, Remembrance Day is observed on 11 November to recall the end of First World War hostilities. Hostilities ended "at the 11th hour of the 11th day of the 11th month" of 1918, in accordance with the armistice signed by representatives of Germany and the Entente between 5:12 and 5:20 that morning. ("At the 11th hour" refers to the passing of the 11th hour, or 11:00 am.) The First World War formally ended with the signing of the Treaty of Versailles on 28 June 1919.

The tradition of Remembrance Day evolved out of Armistice Day. The initial Armistice Day was observed at Buckingham Palace, commencing with King George V hosting a "Banquet in Honour of the President of the French Republic" during the evening hours of 10 November 1919. The first official Armistice Day was subsequently held on the grounds of Buckingham Palace the following morning. During the Second World War, many countries changed the name of the holiday. Member states of the Commonwealth of Nations adopted Remembrance Day, while the US chose Veterans Day.

== Observance in the Commonwealth ==
The common British, Canadian, South African, and ANZAC tradition includes a one- or two-minute silence at the eleventh hour of the eleventh day of the eleventh month (11:00 am, 11 November), as that marks the time (in the United Kingdom) when the armistice became effective.

The Service of Remembrance in many Commonwealth countries generally includes a recitation of the Kohima Epitaph, followed by a sounding of the "Last Post". There is then a period of silence, concluded by the sounding of "Reveille" or sometimes just "The Rouse". The Service of Remembrance is finished by a recitation of the "Ode of Remembrance". The "Flowers of the Forest", "O Valiant Hearts", "I Vow to Thee, My Country" and "Jerusalem" are often played during the service. Services also include wreaths laid to honour the fallen, blessings, and national anthems.

The central ritual at cenotaphs throughout the Commonwealth is a stylised night vigil. "The Last Post" was the common bugle call at the close of the military day, and "The Rouse" was the first call of the morning. For military purposes, the traditional night vigil over the slain was not just to ensure they were indeed dead and not unconscious or in a coma, but also to guard them from being mutilated or despoiled by the enemy, or dragged off by scavengers. This makes the ritual more than just an act of remembrance but also a pledge to guard the honour of war dead. The act is enhanced by the use of dedicated cenotaphs (literally Greek for "empty tomb") and the laying of wreaths—the traditional means of signalling high honours in ancient Greece and Rome.

=== Australia ===
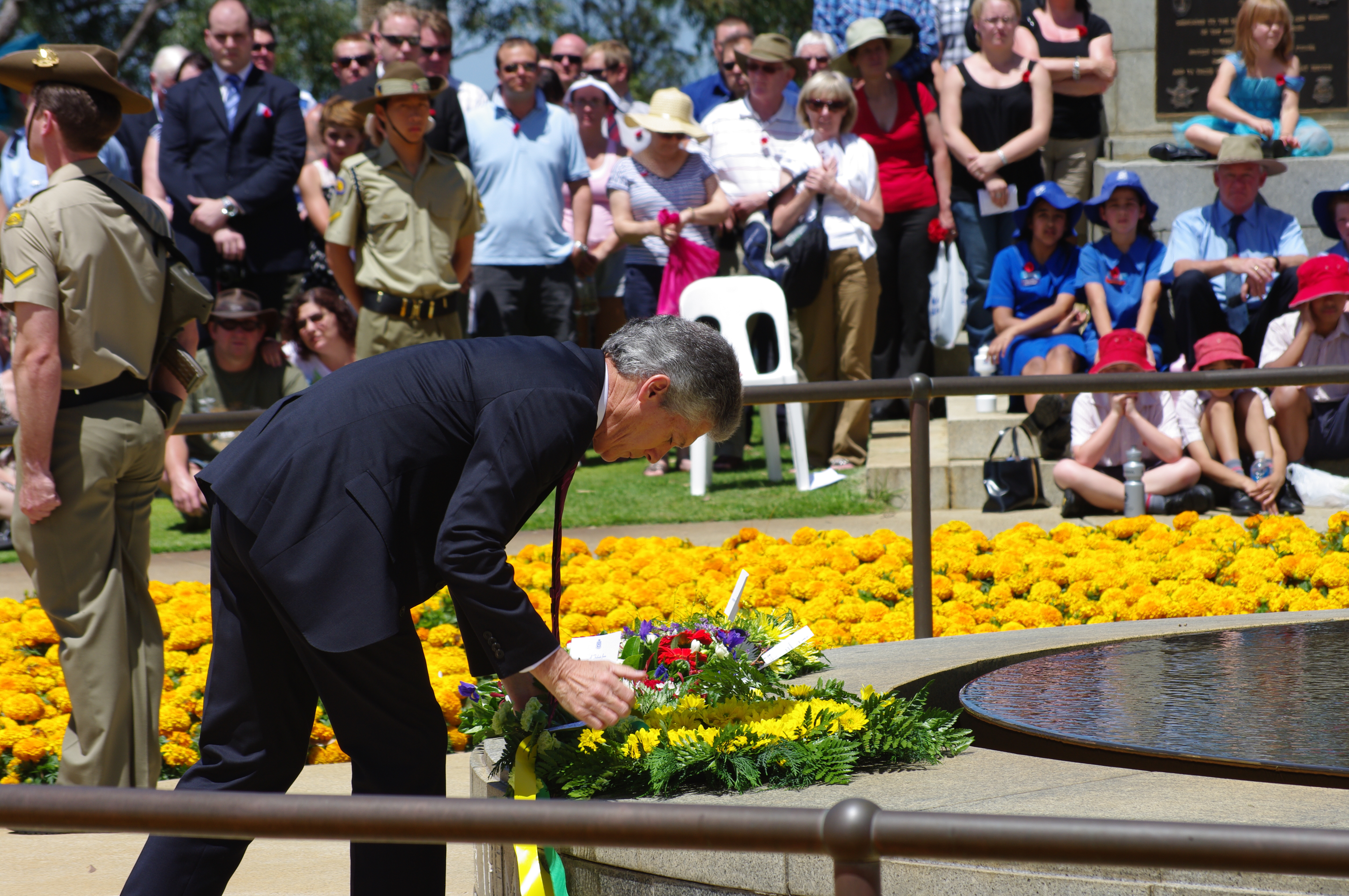
The Australian Minister of Defence, Stephen Smith, lays a wreath at the Eternal flame in Kings Park, Western Australia on Remembrance Day, 2011

In Australia, Remembrance Day is always observed on 11 November, regardless of the day of the week, and is not a public holiday; it is a time when people can pay their respects to the substantial number of soldiers who died in battle. Some institutions observe two-minutes' silence at 11 am through a program named Read 2 Remember, children read the Pledge of Remembrance by Rupert McCall, and teachers deliver specially developed resources to help children understand the significance of the day and the resilience of those who have fought for their country and call on children to also be resilient when facing difficult times. Services are held at 11 am at war memorials and schools in suburbs and cities across the country, at which the "Last Post" is sounded by a bugler and a one-minute silence is observed. When Remembrance Day falls on a normal working day in Melbourne and other major cities, buglers from the Australian Defence Force often play the "Last Post" at major street corners in the CBD. While this occurs, the majority of passers-by stop and observe a moment of silence while waiting for the bugler to finish the recital.

==== History in Australia ====
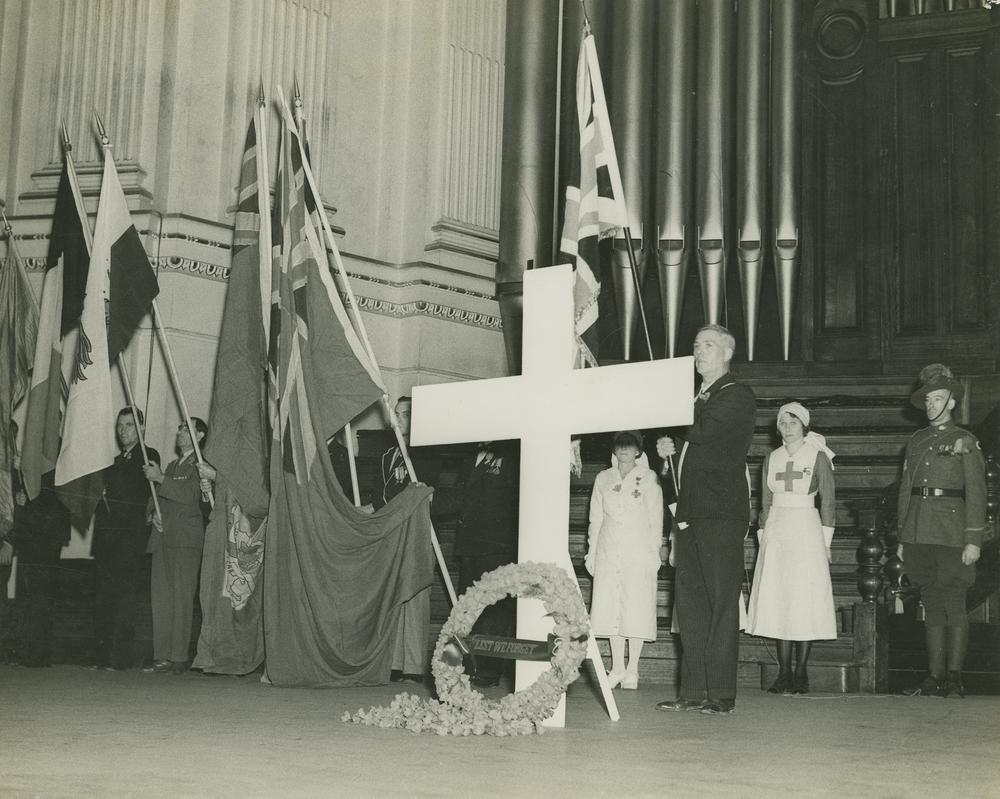
An Armistice Day service at Brisbane City Hall, 1940

In interwar Australia, Remembrance Day (then often referred to as Armistice Day) was a popular public commemoration. But from 1946 to the 1970s, Australians observed Remembrance Sunday following the British pattern. It is only in the 1980s and 1990s that Remembrance Day was once again systematically observed on 11 November. The resurgence of Remembrance Day became official on 30 October 1997, when the Governor-General, under the Howard government, proclaimed that "(a) 11 November in each year shall be known and observed as Remembrance Day; and (b) all Australians are urged to observe, unless impractical, a minute's silence at 11:00 on Remembrance Day each year".

In recent decades, Remembrance Day has been largely eclipsed as the national day of war commemoration by ANZAC Day (25 April), which is a public holiday in all states. Attendance at Anzac Day services boomed, while that of Remembrance Day services continued to decline. Historian Romain Fathi explains, "In Australia, ANZAC Day has addressed the question of the meaning of the war far better than Remembrance Day or Remembrance Sunday. It can acknowledge loss and suffering with a nod to the sacred, while simultaneously representing imagined distinct national values such as mateship, laconic humour and stoicism. This capacity to connect the national community to the numinous explains Anzac Day's primacy over Remembrance Day."

=== Barbados ===
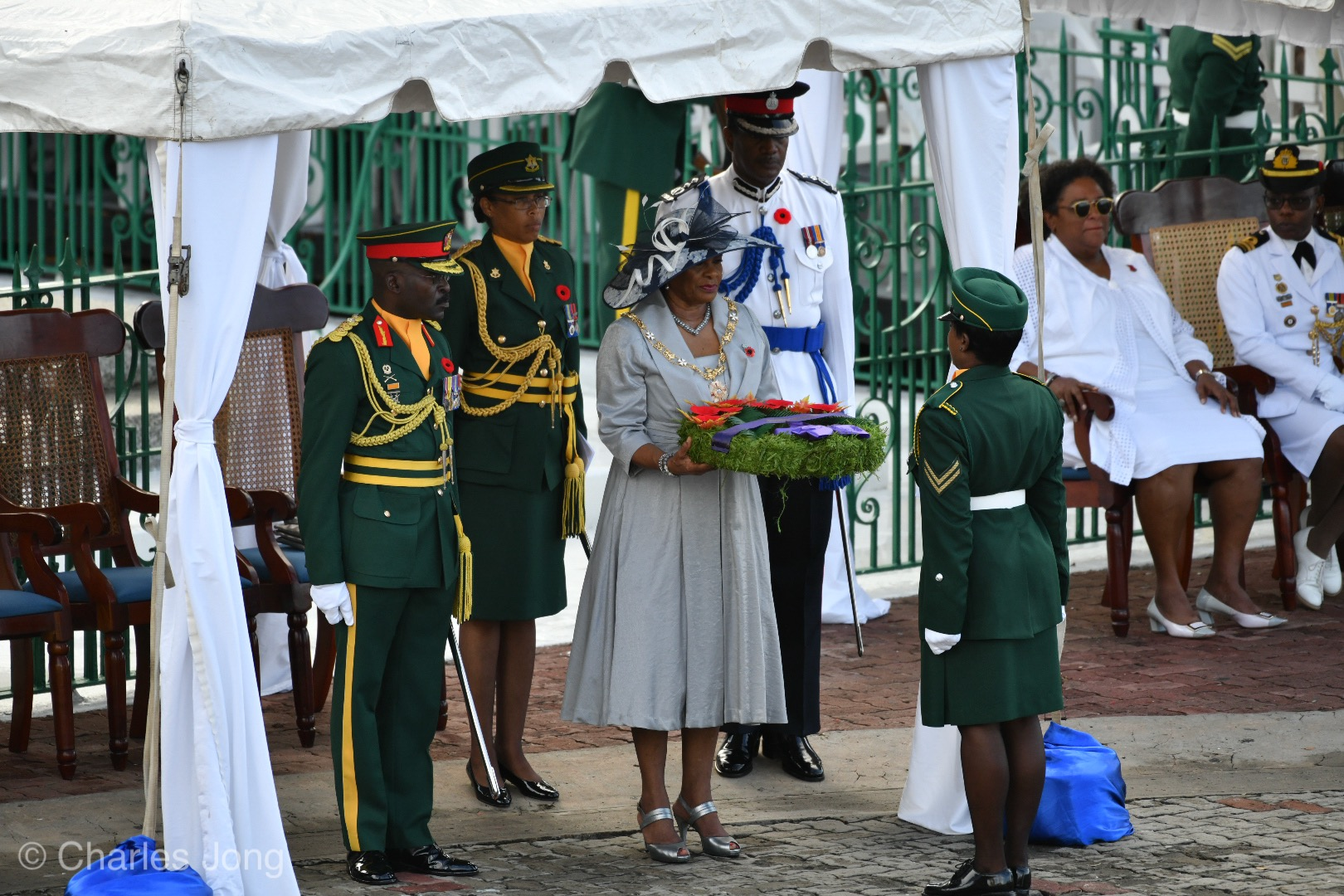
A Remembrance Day parade and service in Bridgetown, Barbados, 2019

In Barbados, Remembrance Day is not a public holiday. It is recognised as 11 November, but the parade and ceremonial events are carried out on Remembrance Sunday. The day is commemorated to recognise the Barbadian soldiers who died fighting in the First and Second World Wars. The parade is held at National Heroes' Square, where an interdenominational service is held. The Governor-General and Barbadian Prime Minister are among those who attend, along with other government dignitaries and the heads of the police and military forces. During the main ceremony a gun salute, wreaths, and prayers are also performed at the war memorial Cenotaph at the heart of Heroes' Square in Bridgetown.

=== Belize ===
In Belize, Remembrance Day is observed on 11 November. It is not a public holiday.

=== Bermuda ===
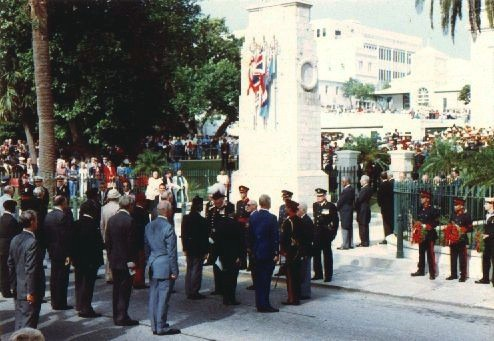
Remembrance Day Parade, Hamilton, Bermuda, 1991

In the British Overseas Territory of Bermuda, Remembrance Day is still an important holiday. The parade in Hamilton had historically been a large and colourful one, as contingents from the Royal Navy, British Regular Army and Territorial Army units of the Bermuda Garrison, the Canadian Forces, the US Army, Air Force, and Navy, and various cadet corps and other services all at one time or another marched with the veterans. In addition to the ceremony held in the City of Hamilton on Remembrance Day itself, marching to the Cenotaph (a smaller replica of the one in London), where wreaths are laid and orations made, the Royal Navy and the Bermuda Sea Cadet Corps held a parade the same day at the HMS Jervis Bay memorial in Hamilton, and a smaller military parade is also held in St. George's on the nearest Sunday to Remembrance Day before the Royal Garrison Artillery memorial in the King's Square.

=== Canada ===
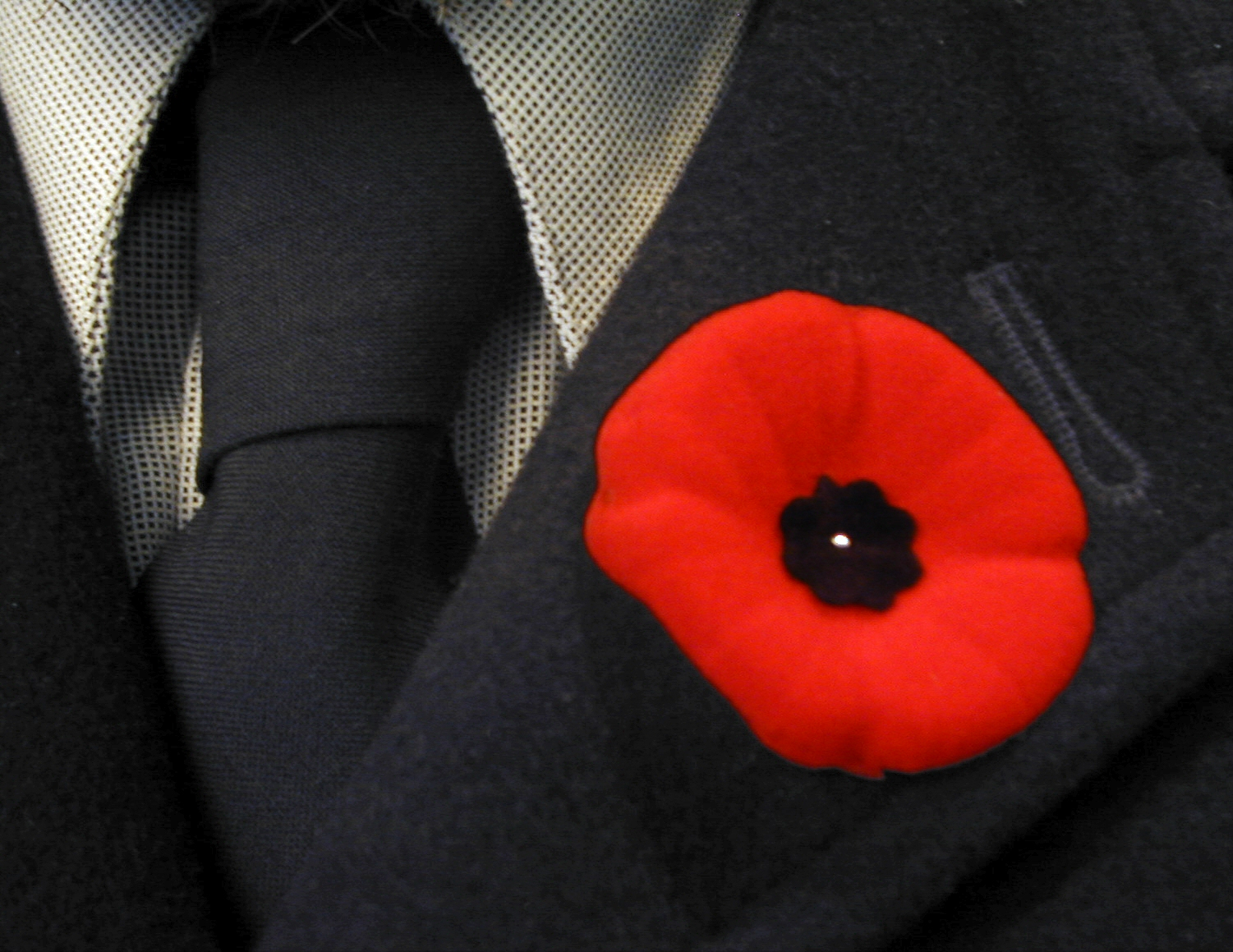
A remembrance poppy distributed by the Royal Canadian Legion worn on a lapel

Veterans Affairs Canada states that Remembrance Day (Jour du Souvenir) is intended for "remembrance for the men and women who have served, and continue to serve our country during times of war, conflict and peace"; particularly the First and Second World Wars, the Korean War, and all conflicts since then in which members of the Canadian Armed Forces have participated. The department runs a program called Canada Remembers, with the mission of helping young and new Canadians, most of whom have never known war, "come to understand and appreciate what those who have served Canada in times of war, armed conflict, and peace stand for and what they have sacrificed for their country."

Remembrance Day is a statutory holiday for federally regulated employees and a provincial and territorial statutory holiday in six of the 10 provinces and all three territories. Nova Scotia and Newfoundland and Labrador recognize the day under separate legislation. Manitoba, Ontario, and Quebec are the only three provinces where the day is not a statutory holiday. The Royal Canadian Legion is officially against making the day a national statutory holiday, in part because its leadership believes the time free from work or school would eventually overtake the memorial purpose of the occasion, whereas, having schools in regular session on that day would be an opportunity for children to be taught the day's true significance in a mandatory fashion. In a more informal manner, there has been opinion voiced against the trend of Christmas creep, so that the conclusion of Remembrance Day should be the earliest acceptable time in which to mark the beginning of the Christmas holidays.

==== History in Canada ====
Canadians began to commemorate their veterans and war dead as early as 1890, when Decoration Day began to be observed on 2 June, the anniversary of the Battle of Ridgeway against the Fenians in 1866. A further observance was, from 1900 to 1918, held on 27 February to mark the Canadian victory over the Boers at the Battle of Paardeberg.

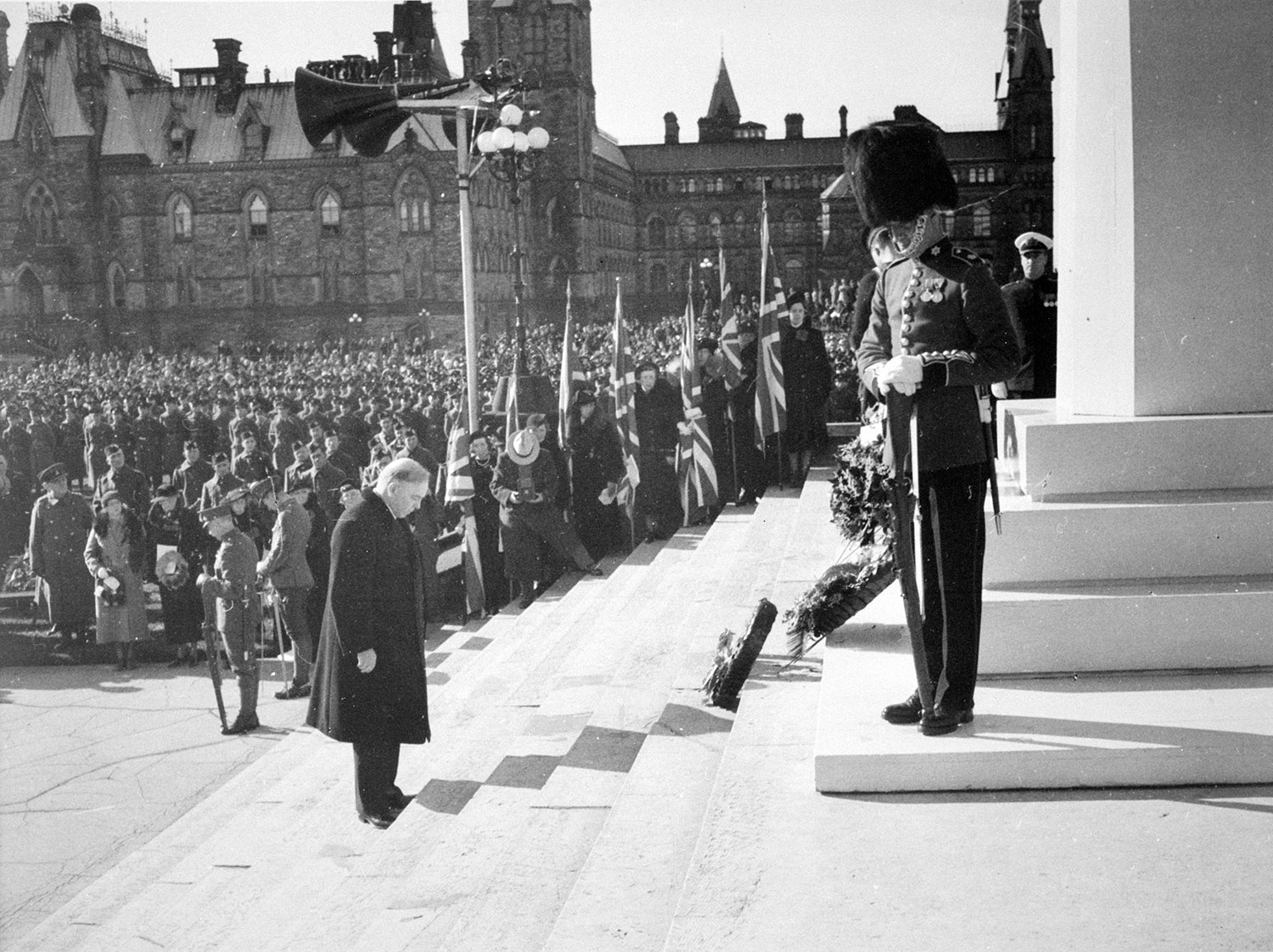
William Lyon Mackenzie King lays a wreath at the future location of the National War Memorial in Ottawa, 1937

The first Armistice Day commemoration was in 1919, when King George V called on all countries in the British Empire to observe it. It was later placed on a statutory footing in 1921, after the Parliament of Canada provided that Thanksgiving and Armistice Day would both be held on the Monday of the week in which 11 November fell. Charles Dickie, the Conservative Member of Parliament for Nanaimo, campaigned to change the name from Armistice Day to Remembrance Day, which was approved in 1931, when Parliament accordingly amended the act, with its observance fixed on 11 November.

Several other days of remembrance for veterans were also created, including the National Aboriginal Veterans Day, inaugurated in 1994 to recognise the contribution of Aboriginal soldiers. In 2001, Merchant Navy Remembrance Day was created by the Canadian Parliament, designating 3 September as a day to recognise the contributions and sacrifice of Canadian merchant mariners.

The No Stone Left Alone campaign started in 2011 in Edmonton's Beechmount Cemetery, where students lay poppies as an act of remembrance on the headstones of those who served.

==== Ceremonies ====
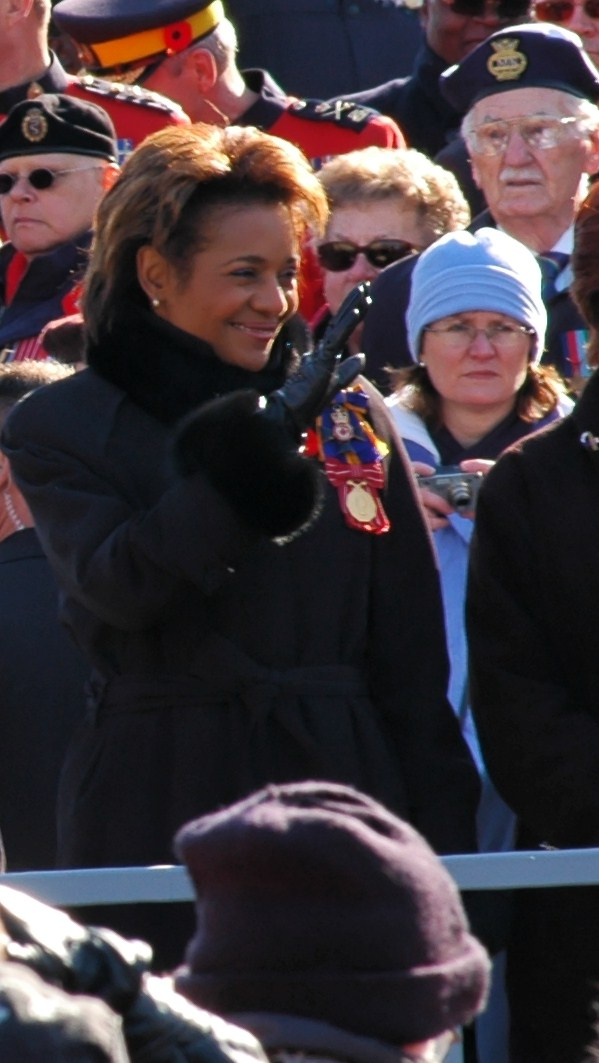
Michaëlle Jean, Governor General and Commander-in-Chief of the Canadian Armed Forces, at Remembrance Day ceremonies in Ottawa, 2007

The national ceremonies organized by the federal government are held at the National War Memorial in Ottawa. These are presided over by the governor general of Canada (who acts as commander-in-chief in the monarch's name) and attended by the Prime Minister of Canada, other dignitaries, the Silver Cross mother, and public observers. Occasionally, a member of the Canadian royal family may also be present (such as Prince Charles in 2009 and Princess Anne in 2014).

English and French languages are used throughout the ceremony because Ottawa is officially bilingual, and the Ottawa-Gatineau census metropolitan area is a mix of anglophones and francophones.

The Ottawa Children's Choir serves as the official choir of the ceremony while the Central Band of the Canadian Armed Forces serves as the official band of the ceremony.

Before the start of the event, four sentries and three sentinels (two flag sentinels and one nursing sister) are posted at the foot of the cenotaph. The commemoration then typically begins with the tolling of the carillon in the Peace Tower, during which current members of the Armed Forces arrive at Confederation Square, followed by the Ottawa diplomatic corps, ministers of the Crown, special guests, the RCL, the royal party (if present), and the viceregal party. The arrival of the governor general is announced by a trumpeter sounding the "Alert", whereupon the viceroy is met by the dominion president of the RCL and escorted to a dais to receive the "Vice Regal Salute", after which the national anthem, "O Canada", is played and sung in English and French.

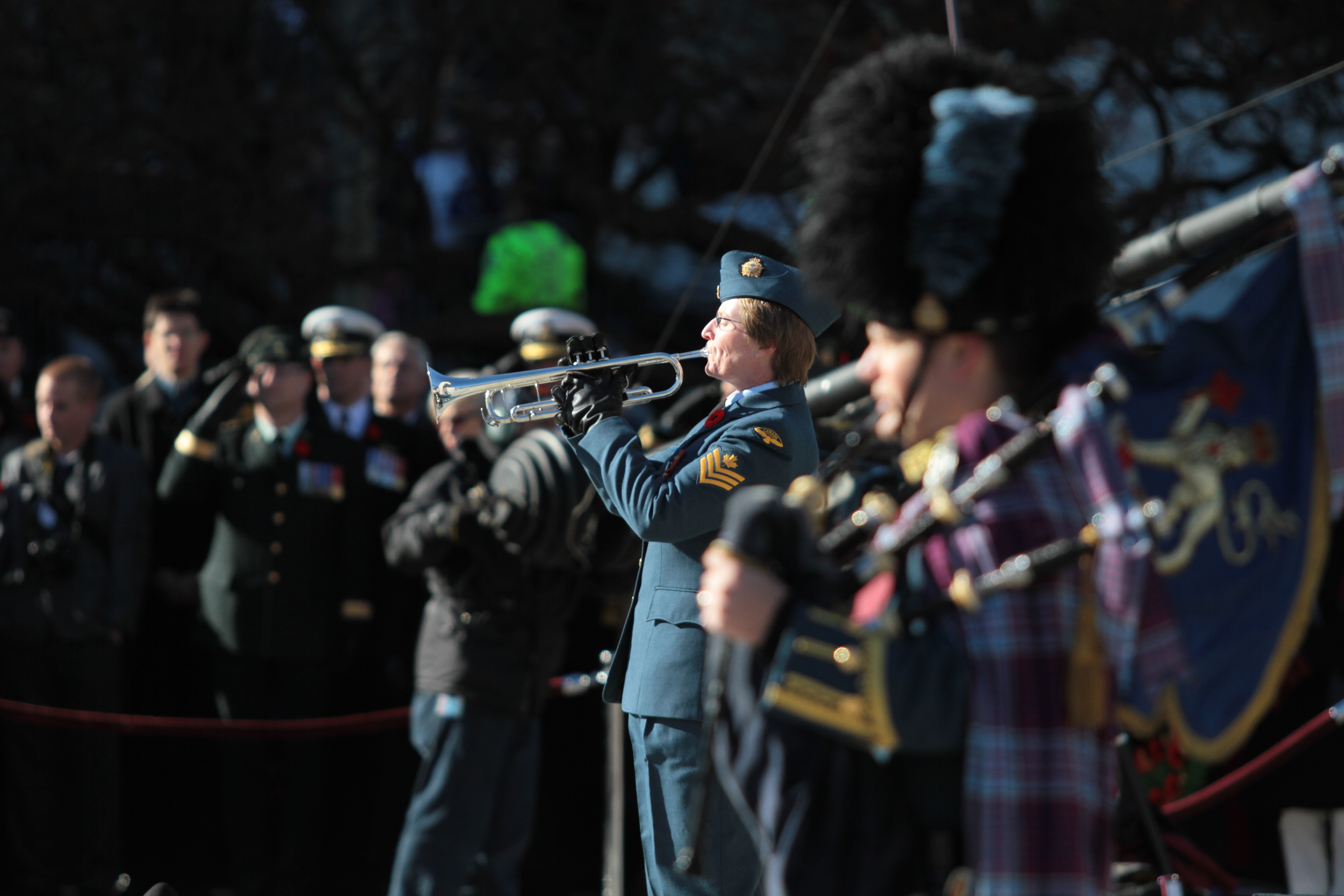
The moment of silence in Canada is preceded by the bugling of "Last Post" immediately before 11 am

The moment of remembrance begins with the bugling of "Last Post", immediately before 11:00 am, when the 21-gun salute fires and the bells of the Peace Tower toll the hour. Two minutes pass between the first and second volleys of the gun salute to maintain silence for that period, as instituted across the Commonwealth by King George V. The cessation of the two minutes of silence is cued by the playing of a lament, the bugling of "The Rouse", and the reading of the Act of Remembrance. A flypast of Royal Canadian Air Force craft then occurs, upon the completion of which a choir sings "In Flanders Fields".

The various parties then lay their wreaths at the base of the memorial. By tradition, the Governor General always lays the first wreath followed by the Silver Cross mother (a recent recipient of the Memorial Cross, on behalf of all mothers whose children died in conflicts in which Canada participated) and the Prime Minister. The viceregal and royal group return to the dais to receive the playing of the Canadian royal anthem, "God Save the King", sung in French and English, prior to the assembled armed forces personnel and veterans performing a march past in front of the viceroy and any royal guest, bringing about the end of the official ceremonies. A tradition of paying a more personal tribute has emerged since the Tomb of the Unknown Soldier was installed at the Canadian National War Memorial in 2000: after the official ceremony, the general public place their poppies atop the tomb.

Similar ceremonies take place in provincial capitals across the country, officiated by the relevant lieutenant governor, as well as in other cities, towns, and even hotels or corporate headquarters. Schools will usually hold special assemblies for the first half of the day or on the school day prior, with various presentations concerning the remembrance of the war dead. The ceremony participants include veterans, current members of the Canadian forces, and sea, army, and air cadet units.

=== India ===
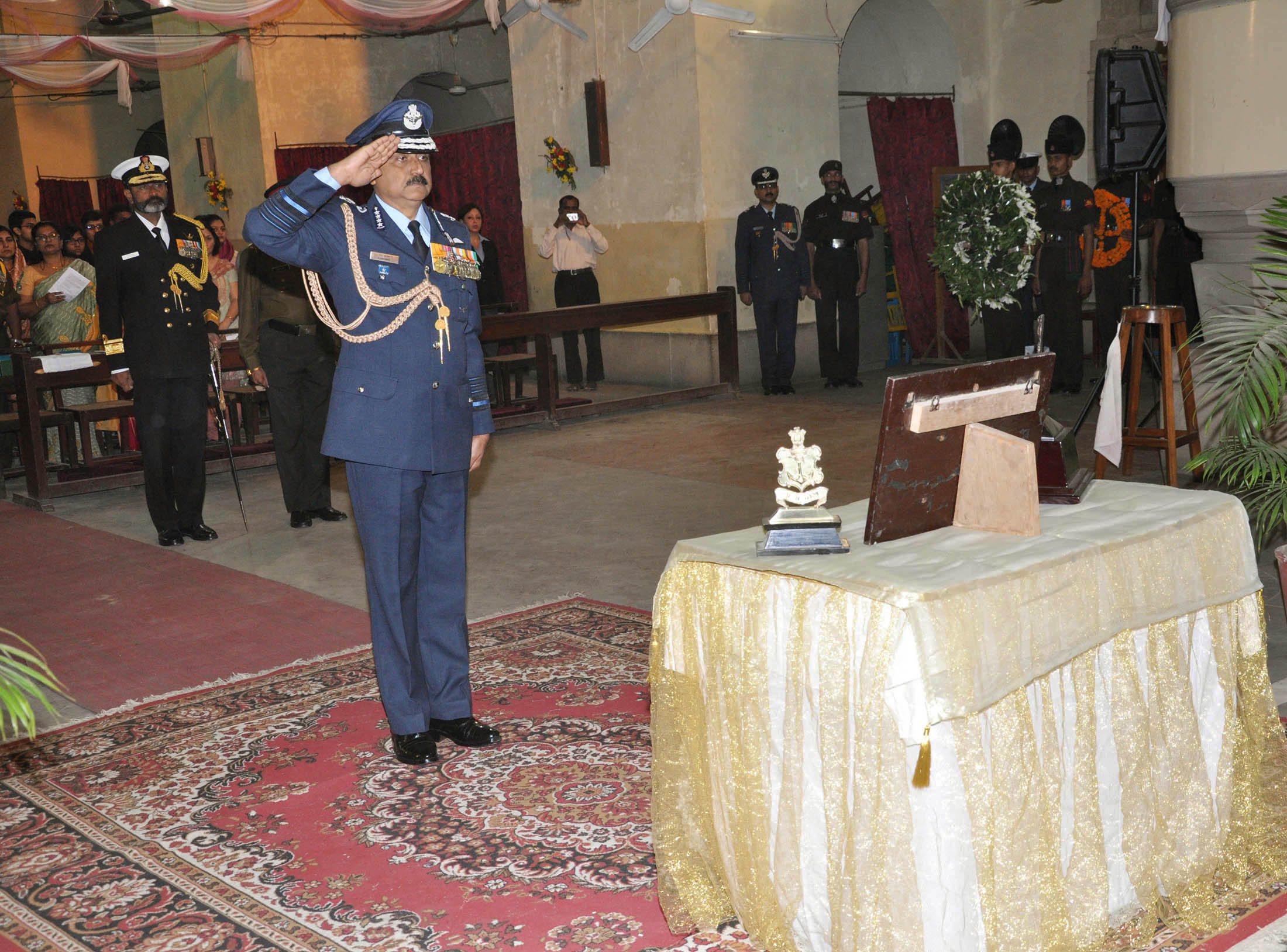
Chief of the Air Staff, Air Chief Marshal N. A. K. Browne leads a Remembrance Day tribute in New Delhi, 13 November 2011.

In India, the day is usually marked by tributes and ceremonies in army cantonments. There are memorial services in some churches such as St. Mark's Cathedral and St. John's Church in Bangalore. At Kohima and Imphal in the remote hillsides of Northeast India, services of remembrance supported by the Indian Army are observed at Kohima and Imphal War Cemeteries (maintained by the Commonwealth War Graves Commission). The day is also marked at the Delhi War Cemetery. In 2013, Prince Charles and Camilla, Duchess of Cornwall, marked the day in Mumbai's St. John the Evangelist Church.

=== Kenya ===
In Kenya, the Kenya Armed Forces Old Comrades Association (KAFOCA) was established in Kenya immediately in 1945 to cater for the welfare of the ex-servicemen of the First and Second World Wars. The KAFOCA and Kenyan Government recognise Remembrance Day.

=== New Zealand ===
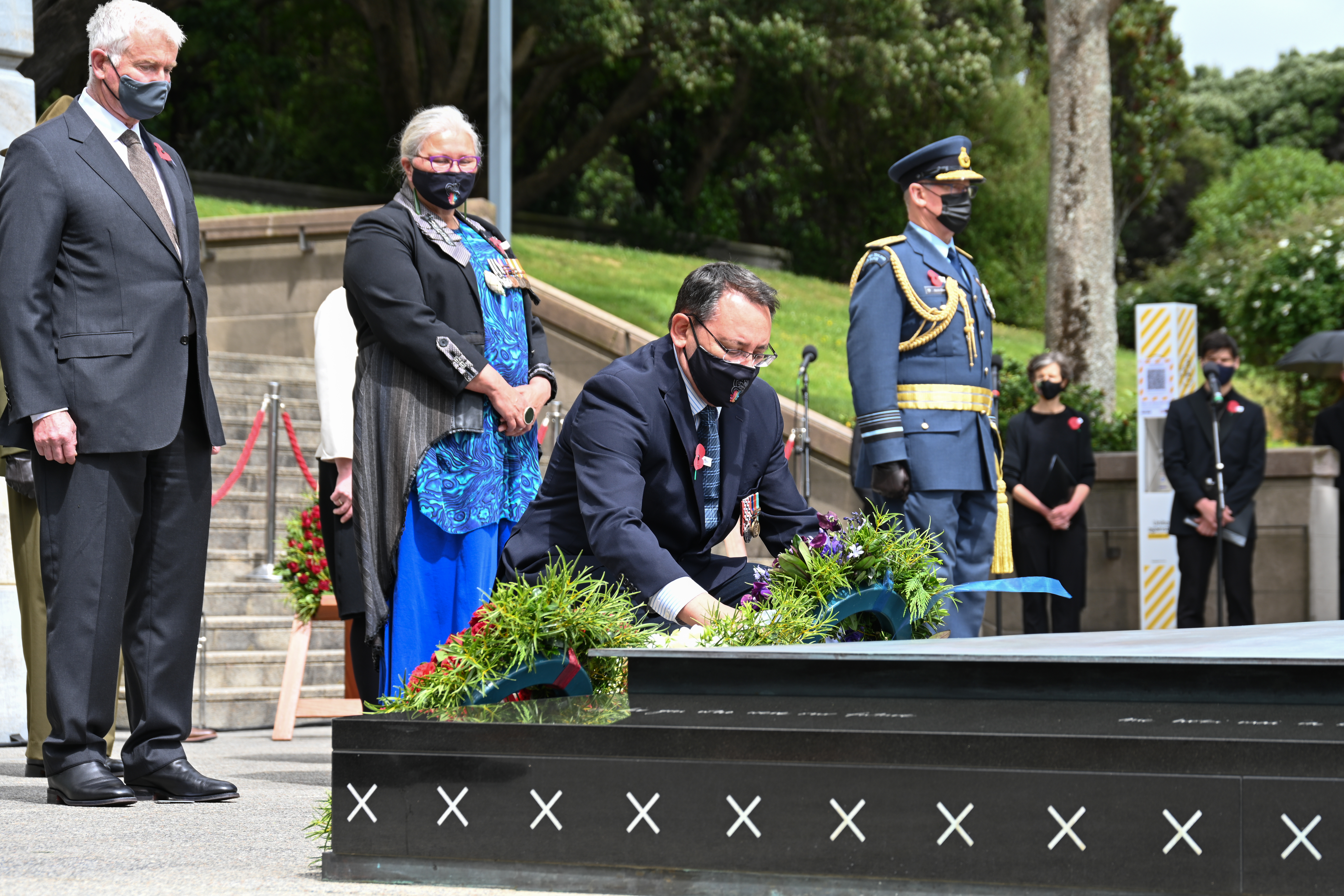
Shane Reti lays a wreath at the New Zealand Tomb of the Unknown Soldier on behalf of the Official Opposition to commemorate Armistice Day, 2021

Armistice Day was observed in New Zealand between the World Wars, although it was always secondary to Anzac Day. As in other countries, New Zealand's Armistice Day was converted to Remembrance Day after World War II. However, by the mid-1950s, the day was virtually ignored, even by churches and veterans' organisations.

As a result, New Zealand's national day of remembrance is Anzac Day, 25 April. Poppy Day usually occurs on the Friday before Anzac Day. The reason for New Zealand having their remembrance on Anzac Day happened in 1921. The paper Poppies for Armistice that year arrived by ship too late for 11 November 1921, so an RSA branch distributed them at the next commemoration date (25 April 1922, which happened to be Anzac Day) and that date stuck as the new Poppy Day in New Zealand.

=== Saint Lucia ===
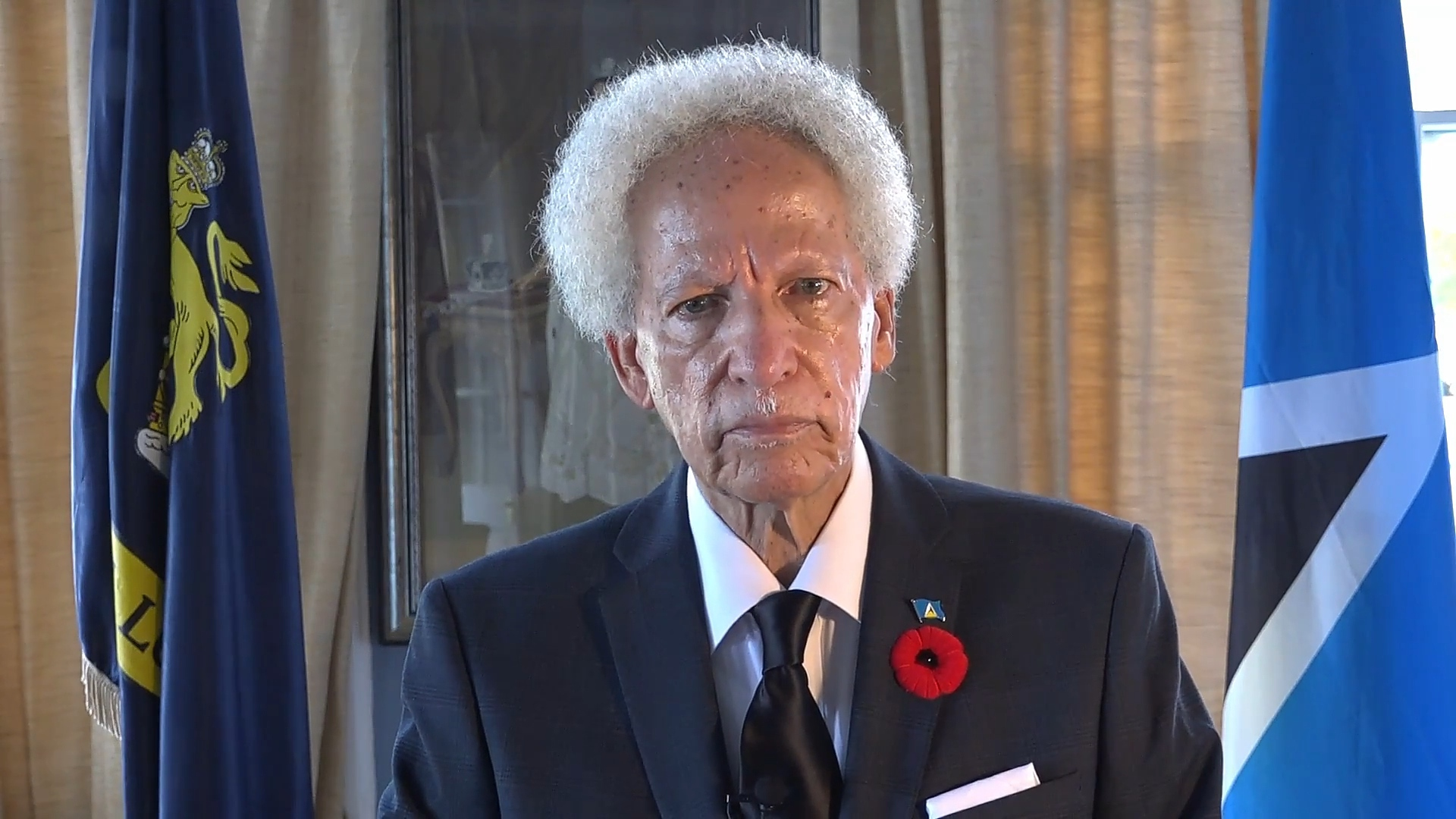
Saint Lucian Governor General Neville Cenac during his Remembrance Day address, 2018

Like Barbados, Saint Lucia does not recognise Remembrance Day as a public holiday. Instead, ceremonial events such as parades and other activities are held on Remembrance Sunday. The parade is held at the central square, namely the Derek Walcott Square, where the Cenotaph is located. There, members of the Royal St Lucia Police Force and other uniformed groups such as the St Lucia Cadet Corps pay tribute through commemoration of St. Lucian men and women who fought in the war.

=== South Africa ===
In South Africa, Remembrance Day is not a public holiday. Commemoration ceremonies are usually held on the nearest Sunday, at which the "Last Post" is played by a bugler followed by the observation of a two-minute silence. Ceremonies to mark the event in South Africa are held at the Cenotaph in Cape Town, and in Pretoria at the Voortrekker Monument cenotaph and the War Memorial at the Union Buildings. Many high schools hold Remembrance Day services to honour the past pupils who died in the two World Wars and the Border War. In addition, the South African Legion of Military Veterans holds a street collection on the nearest Saturday to gather funds to assist in welfare work among military veterans.

=== United Kingdom ===
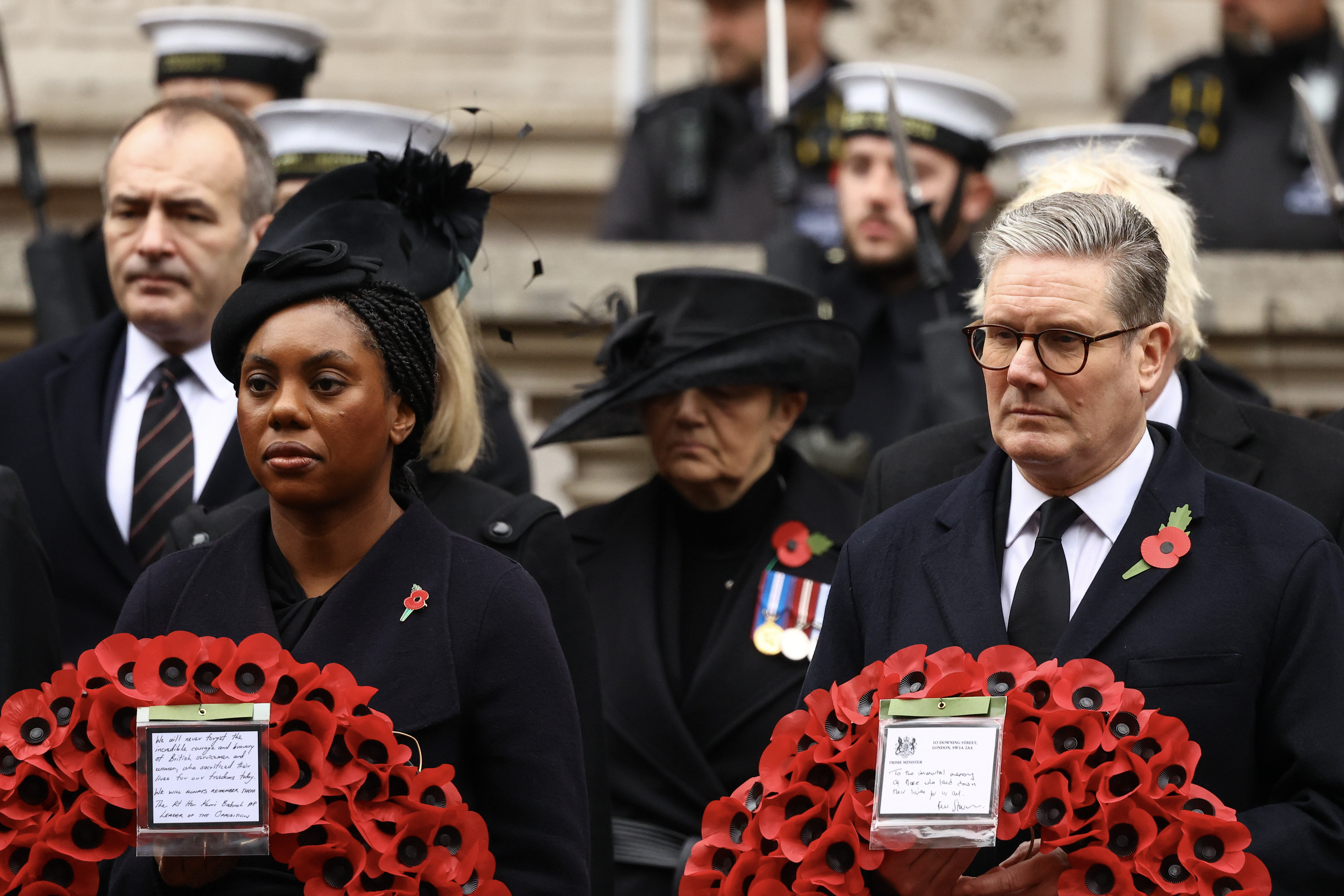
Prime Minister Keir Starmer and Opposition Leader Kemi Badenoch were seen together at the Remembrance Day event on November 10, 2024.

Wreath-laying ceremonies, usually organised by local branches of the Royal British Legion, are observed on Remembrance Day at most war memorials across the UK at 11 am on 11 November, with two minutes of silence observed; a custom which had lapsed before a campaign for its revival began in the early 1990s. The silence is also widely observed by radio and television broadcasters.

Many employers and businesses invite their staff and customers to observe the two minutes' silence at 11:00 am. The beginning and end of the two minutes' silence is often marked in large towns and cities by the firing of field artillery gun, often provided by the local Royal Artillery battery.

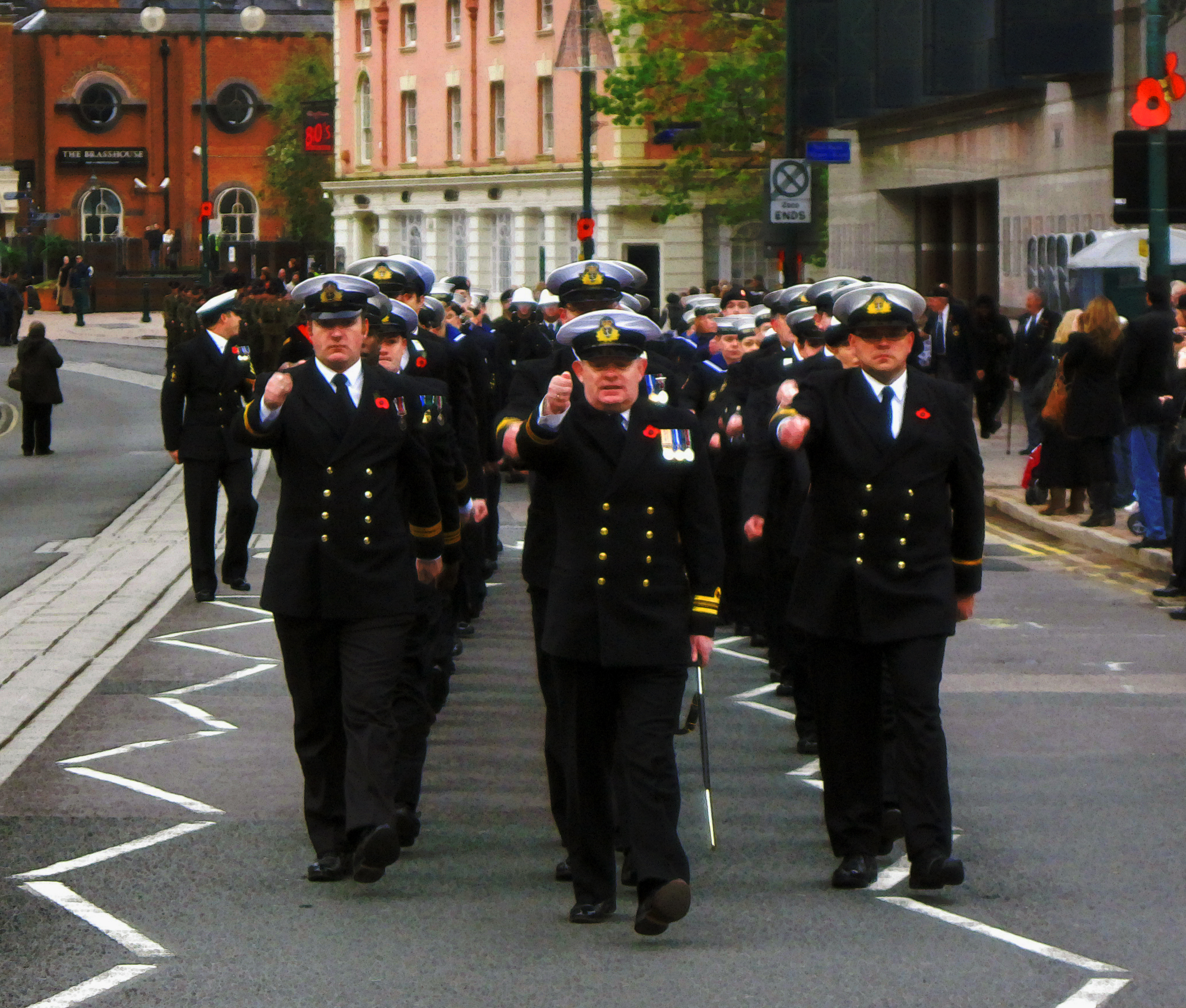
Officers of the Royal Navy on parade on Remembrance Day, 2010

The first two-minute silence held in London (11 November 1919) was reported in The Manchester Guardian on 12 November 1919:

The first stroke of eleven produced a magical effect.

The tram cars glided into stillness, motors ceased to cough and fume, and stopped dead, and the mighty-limbed dray horses hunched back upon their loads and stopped also, seeming to do it of their own volition.

Someone took off his hat, and with a nervous hesitancy the rest of the men bowed their heads also. Here and there an old soldier could be detected slipping unconsciously into the posture of 'attention'. An elderly woman, not far away, wiped her eyes, and the man beside her looked white and stern. Everyone stood very still ... The hush deepened. It had spread over the whole city and become so pronounced as to impress one with a sense of audibility. It was a silence which was almost pain ... And the spirit of memory brooded over it all.

==== Remembrance Sunday ====
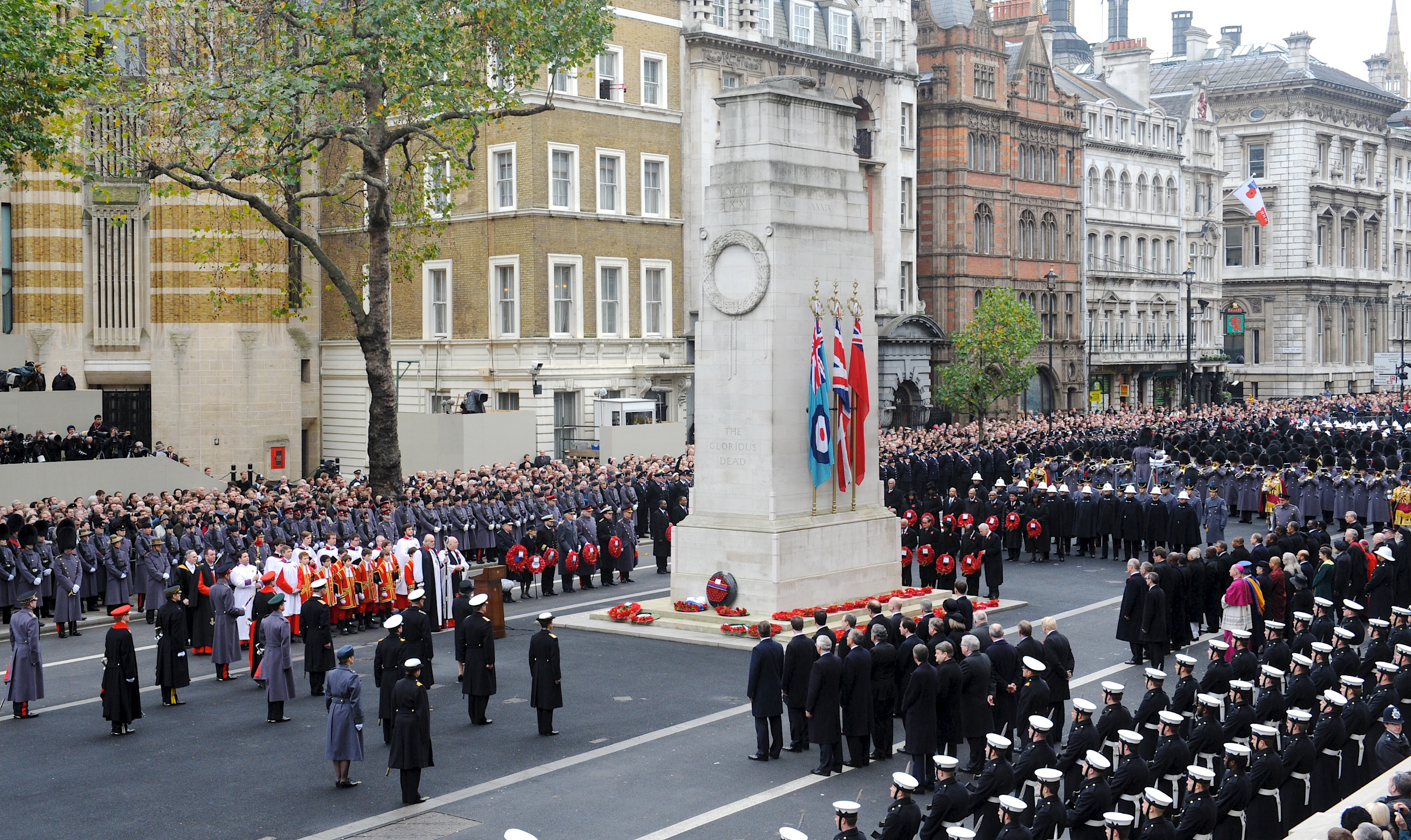
Wreath laying ceremony during the National Service of Remembrance, 2010

In the United Kingdom, the main observance is Remembrance Sunday, held on the Sunday nearest to 11 November. There is a National Service of Remembrance in London, as well as other services and ceremonies in the regions. Typically, poppy wreaths are laid by representatives of the Crown, the armed forces, and local civic leaders, as well as by local organisations including ex-servicemen organisations, cadet forces, the Scouts, Guides, Boys' Brigade, St John Ambulance and the Salvation Army. A minute's or two minutes' silence is also frequently incorporated into church services.

British diplomatic missions also organise services on Remembrance Sunday. Services organised by British missions in Israel include one at the Jerusalem British War Cemetery, organised by the British Consul in Jerusalem; and another at Ramleh Commonwealth War Graves Commission Cemetery, organised by the British embassy in Tel Aviv. The Ramleh ceremony is the larger and is also attended by veterans of the Second World War.

==== Commemorative coins and exhibitions ====
In 2014, the Royal Mint issued a colour-printed Alderney £5 coin, designed by engraver Laura Clancy, to commemorate Remembrance Day.

Also in 2014, to commemorate the outbreak of World War I a huge display called Blood Swept Lands and Seas of Red, consisting of 888,246 ceramic poppies was installed in the moat of the Tower of London, each poppy representing a British Empire fatality.

On 5 November 2018 and set to continue for 4 months, about 10,000 torches were lit at the foot of the Tower's walls, in its dry moat to mark the centenary of the end of the World War I.

==== Northern Ireland ====
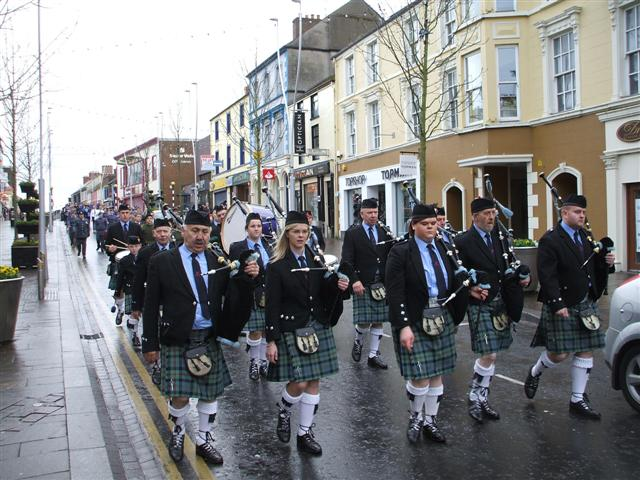
A Remembrance Day parade taking place in Omagh, 2007

Remembrance Day is officially observed in Northern Ireland in the same way as in the rest of United Kingdom, although it tends to be associated more with the unionist community. Most Irish nationalists and republicans do not take part in the public commemoration of British soldiers organised by the Royal British Legion. This is mainly due to the actions of the British Army during The Troubles. However, some moderate nationalists began to attend Remembrance Day events as a way to connect with the unionist community. In 1987 a bomb was detonated by the Provisional Irish Republican Army (IRA) just before a Remembrance Sunday ceremony in Enniskillen, killing eleven people. The bombing was widely condemned and attendance at Remembrance events, by both nationalists and unionists, rose in the following years. The Republic of Ireland has a National Day of Commemoration in July for all Irish people who have died in war.

== Related observances elsewhere ==
Alongside Commonwealth countries, several other countries also commemorate their war dead on 11 November, the anniversary of the Armistice of Compiègne. Several other countries observe the anniversary of other notable events in World War I to commemorate the war dead from that conflict, such as the date of the Armistice of Villa Giusti, which went into effect on 4 November.

=== Belgium and France ===
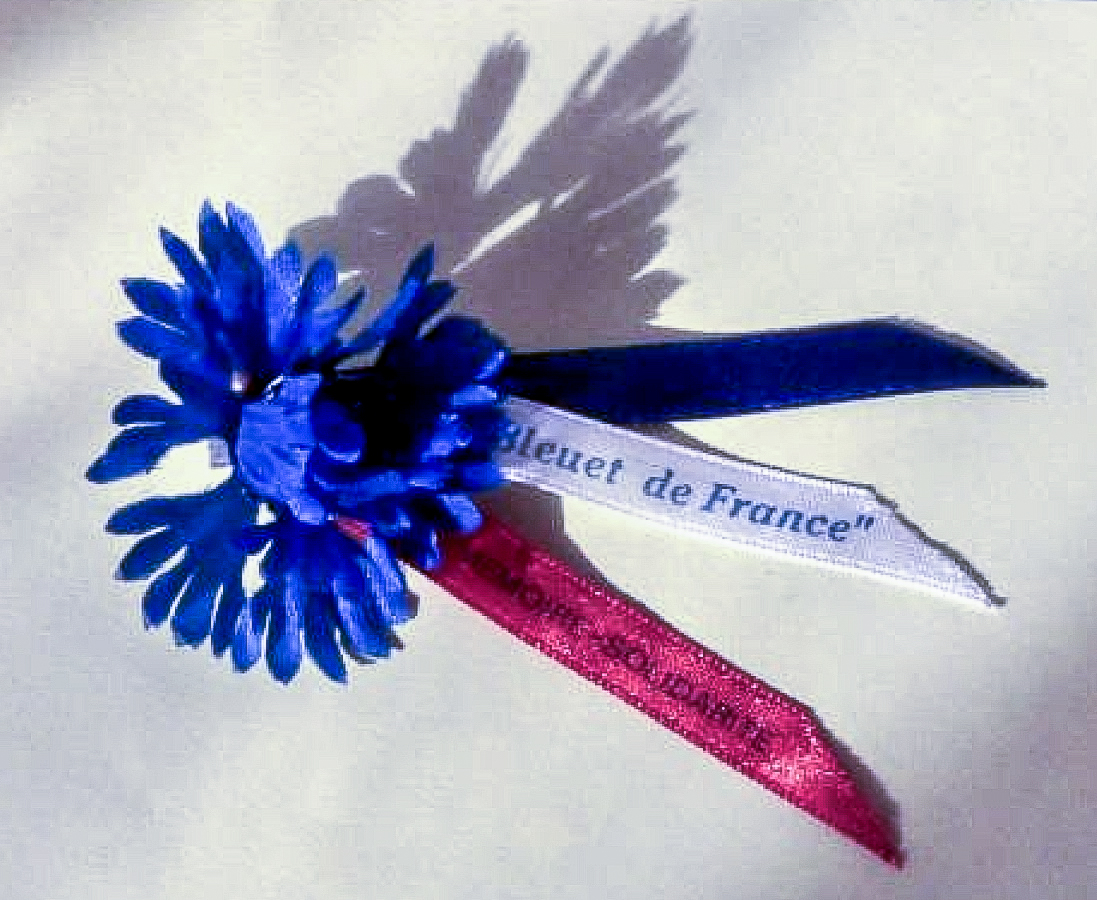
Bleuet de France, circa 1950

Remembrance Day (11 November) is a national holiday in France and Belgium. It commemorates the armistice signed between the Allies and Germany at Compiègne, France, for the cessation of hostilities on the Western Front, which took effect at 11:00 am—the "eleventh hour of the eleventh day of the eleventh month." Armistice Day is one of the most important military commemorations in France, since it was a major French victory, and the French paid a heavy price in blood to achieve it. The First World War was considered in France as the "Great Patriotic War". Almost all French villages feature memorials dedicated to those fallen during the conflict. In France the blue cornflower (Bleuet de France) is used symbolically rather than the poppy.

=== Hong Kong ===
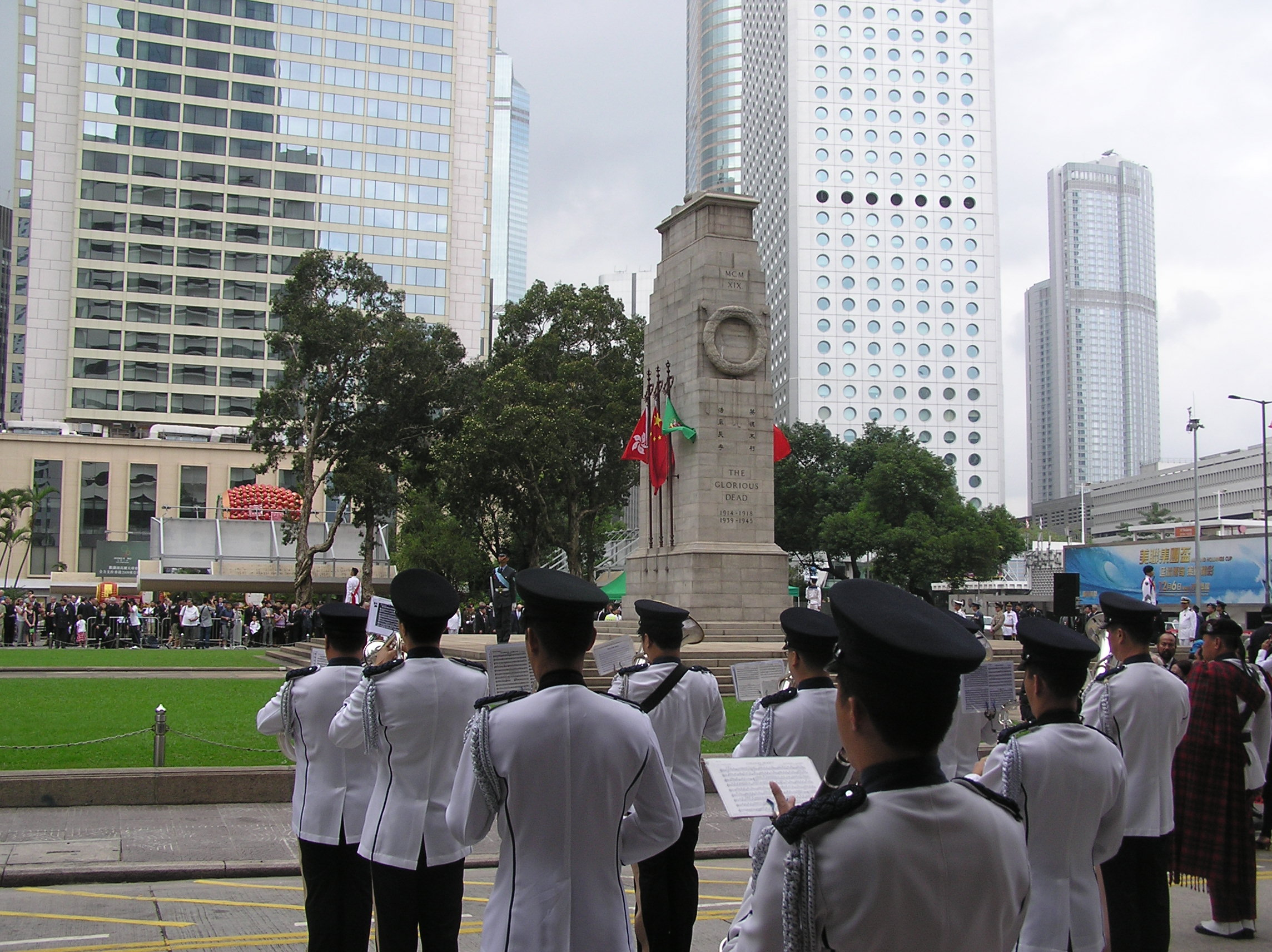
The Hong Kong Police Band at the memorial service by the Cenotaph in Central, Hong Kong

Remembrance Day was formerly observed in British Hong Kong, although it has not been a public holiday since the handover of Hong Kong from the UK to China in July 1997.

However, members of the Hong Kong Ex-Servicemen's Association continue to organise a Remembrance Sunday multi-faith memorial service at the Cenotaph in Central, Hong Kong. The service has been attended by various government officials and the representatives of religious groups. The memorial service resembles the services performed in other Commonwealth countries. The service includes the sounding of "Last Post", two minutes of silence, the sounding of "Reveille", the laying of wreaths, and prayers, and ends with a recitation of the "Ode of Remembrance". The Hong Kong Police Band continues to perform their ceremonial duty at the service. Members of the Hong Kong Air Cadet Corps (including the Ceremonial Squadron), Hong Kong Adventure Corps, Hong Kong Sea Cadet Corps and scouting organisations are also in attendance.

=== Italy ===
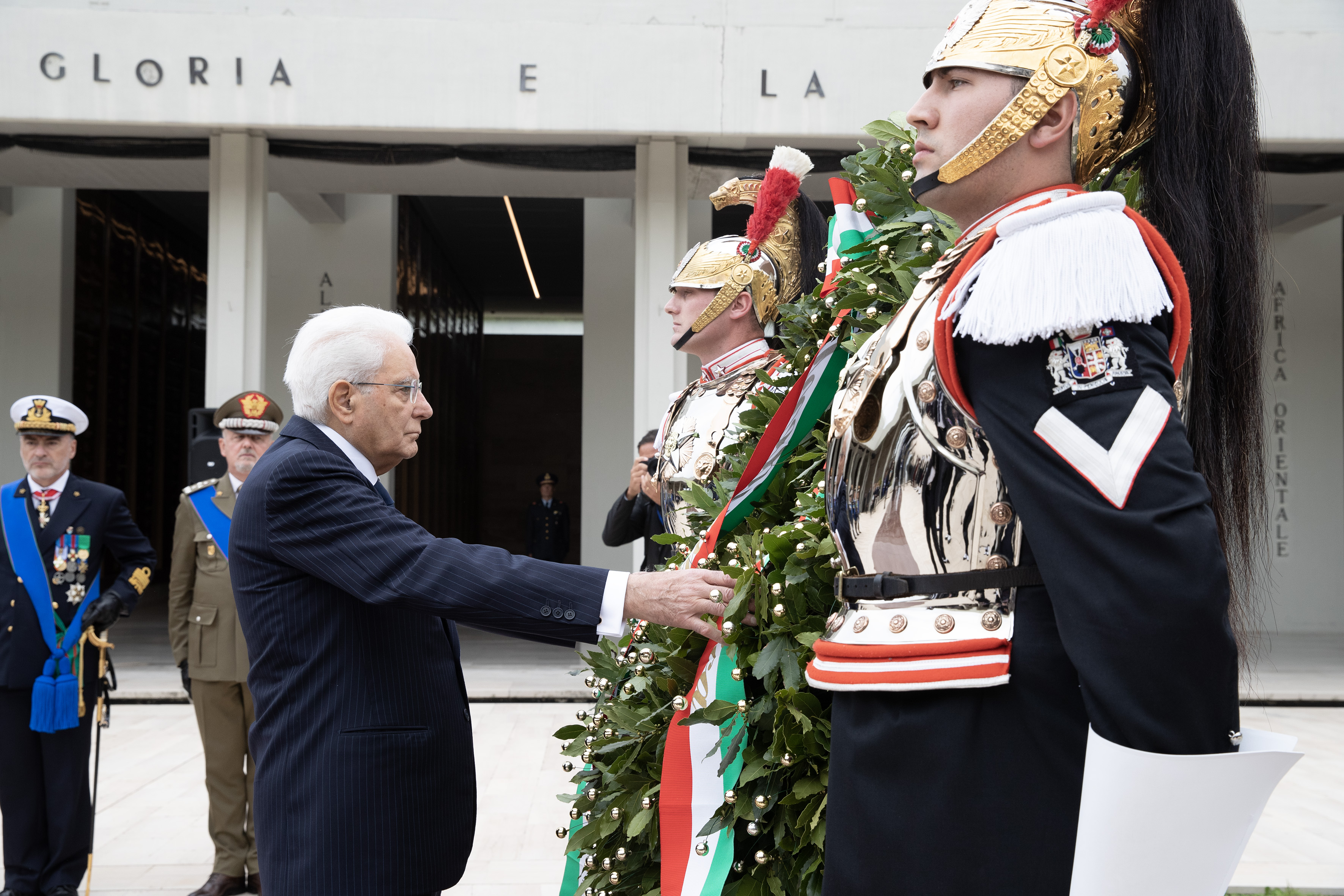
Italian president Sergio Mattarella at a National Unity and Armed Forces Day ceremony. The holiday takes place on 4 November, the anniversary of the Armistice of Villa Giusti in 1918.

In Italy, the National Unity and Armed Forces Day is observed on 4 November to commemorate the country's victory in World War I, and the completion of the unification of Italy. The date is the anniversary of the Armistice of Villa Giusti, which effectively ended combat between the Allies of World War I and Austria-Hungary in 1918. Since 1977, this day has not been a public holiday; now, many services are held on the first Sunday in November.

=== Russia ===
In Russia, the Russian Day of Remembrance of Victims of World War I is observed on 1 August to honour Imperial Russian Army soldiers from that conflict. The date is the anniversary of the German declaration of war on the Russian Empire in 1914, resulting in the Russian entry into World War I.

=== Serbia ===
Serbia has observed Armistice Day on 11 November since 2012. The statutory holiday was created to commemorate the victims of World War I. To commemorate their victims, people in Serbia wear Natalie's ramonda as a symbol of remembrance.

=== United States ===
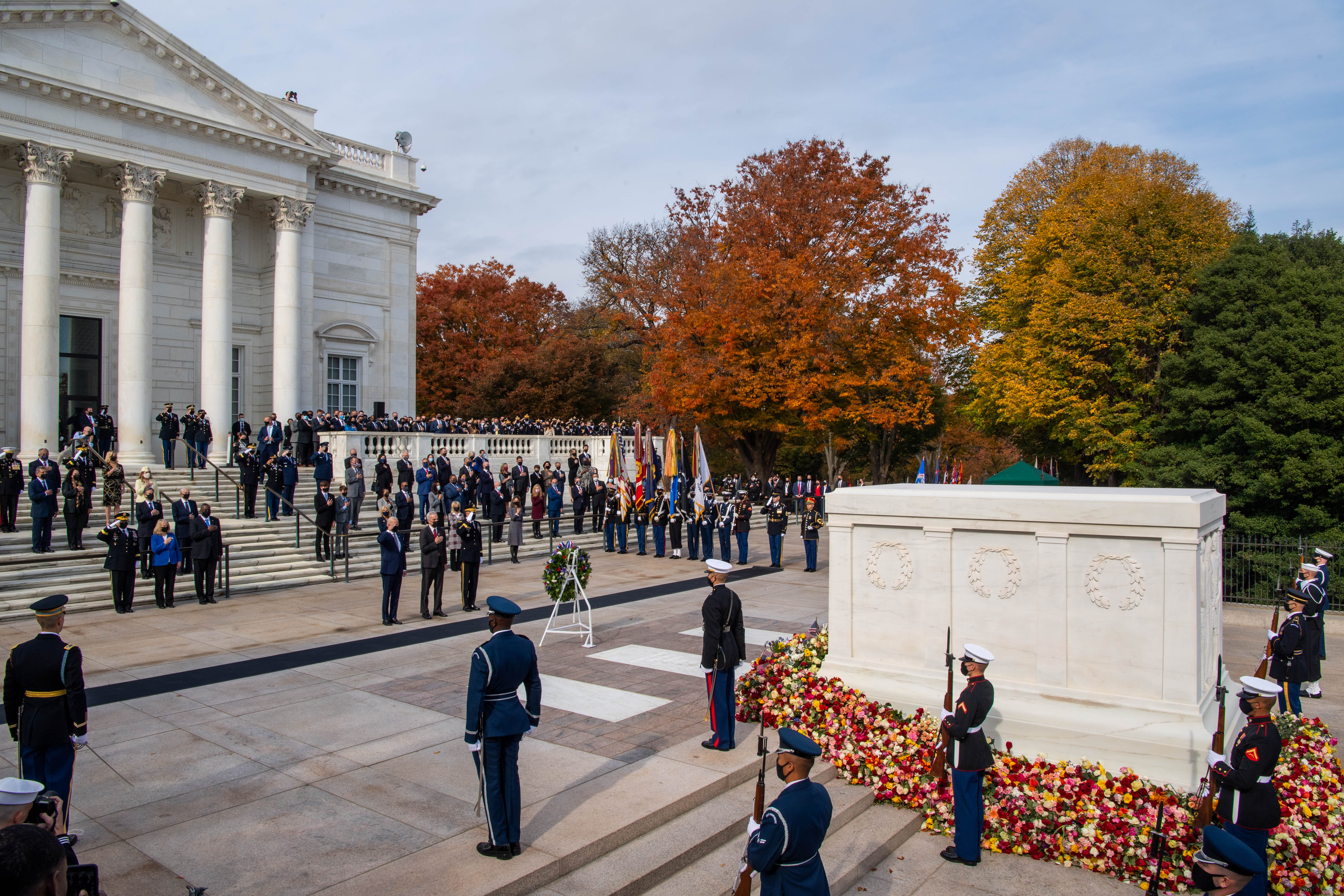
A Veterans Day service at the American Tomb of the Unknown Soldier, 2021

Veterans Day is observed in the United States on 11 November and is both a federal holiday and a state holiday in all states. In the United States, and some other allied nations, 11 November was formerly known as Armistice Day; in the United States it was given its new name in 1954 at the end of the Korean War to honour all veterans. Veterans Day is observed with memorial ceremonies, salutes at military cemeteries, and parades. However, the function of the observance elsewhere is more closely matched by Memorial Day, another commemorative holiday held in May.

== Similar holidays commemorating veterans ==
=== Croatia ===
In Croatia, Day of Remembrance for the Victims of the Homeland War and Day of Remembrance for the Victims of Vukovar and Škabrnja is a national public holiday and a non-working day in memory of all victims of the Homeland War in Croatia. The holiday is celebrated on November 18, the day of the fall of the city of Vukovar in the 1991 Homeland War, when the Yugoslav People's Army and Serbian paramilitaries committed the two most massive crimes in Croatia during the Croatian War of Independence in two Croatian towns, Vukovar and Škabrnja. These events are known as Vukovar massacre and Škabrnja massacre. In memory of these events, the Croatian Parliament in 2019 adopted a new law which introduced a new holiday, a day of remembrance for all victims of the Croatian War of Independence.

=== Denmark ===
In 2009 the Danish government established Veterans' Day with early events on 5 September where past and present members of the armed forces, who have done service in armed conflict, are remembered.

=== Germany ===
The German national day of mourning is the secular public holiday of Volkstrauertag, which since 1952 has been observed two Sundays before the first Sunday of Advent; in practice this is the Sunday closest to 16 November. The anniversary of the Armistice itself is not observed in Germany.

=== Ireland ===
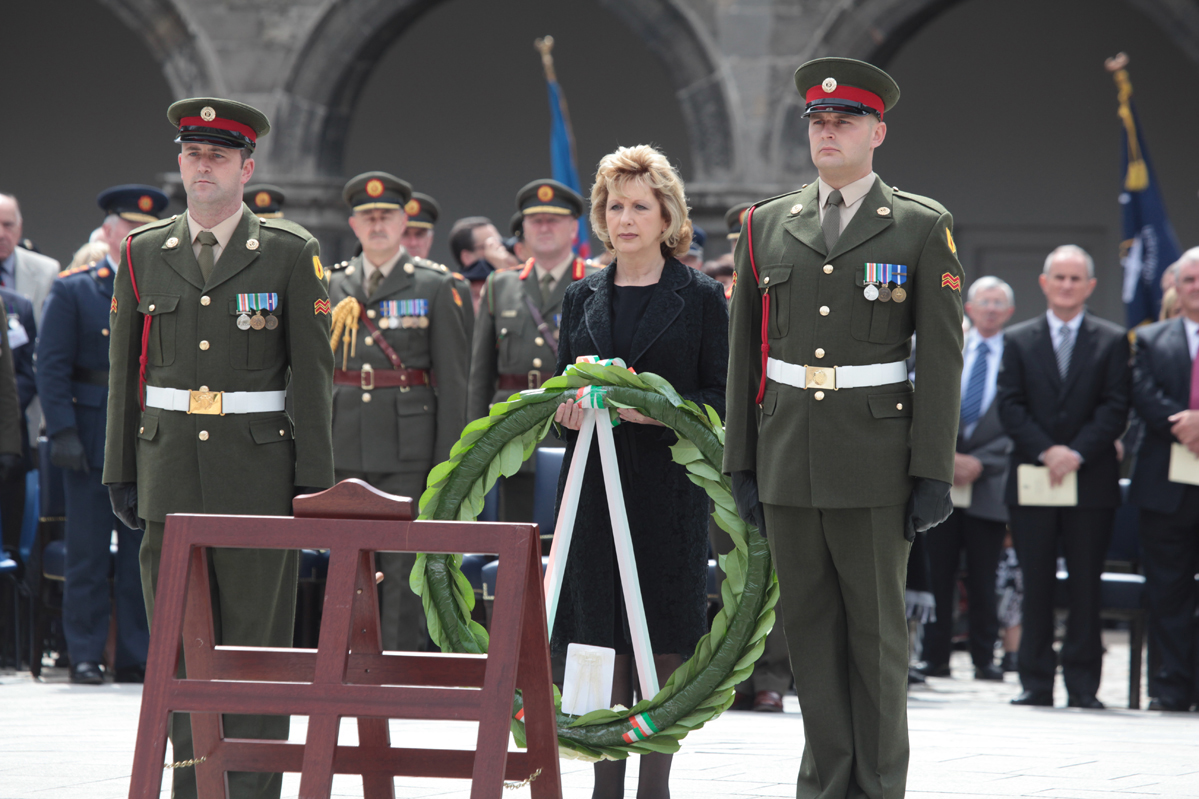
Irish President Mary McAleese with a wreath during the National Day of Commemoration ceremony. The national day occurs in July and commemorates all Irish people who died in conflicts.

The Republic of Ireland holds a National Day of Commemoration in July for Irish men and women who have died in war. The national day is typically held close to the anniversary date of when the truce for the Irish War of Independence went into effect in 1921.

Remembrance Sunday itself is marked by a ceremony in St Patrick's Cathedral, Dublin, which the President of Ireland attends, although it is not a recognised holiday in Ireland. It is estimated that some 200,000 Irish soldiers fought on the British side in the First World War with up to 35,000 killed. Additionally, some 70,000 citizens of the then independent state of Ireland served in the British armed services during the Second World War and the Roll of Honour in Trinity College Dublin lists 3617 of those who died on active service.

=== Netherlands ===
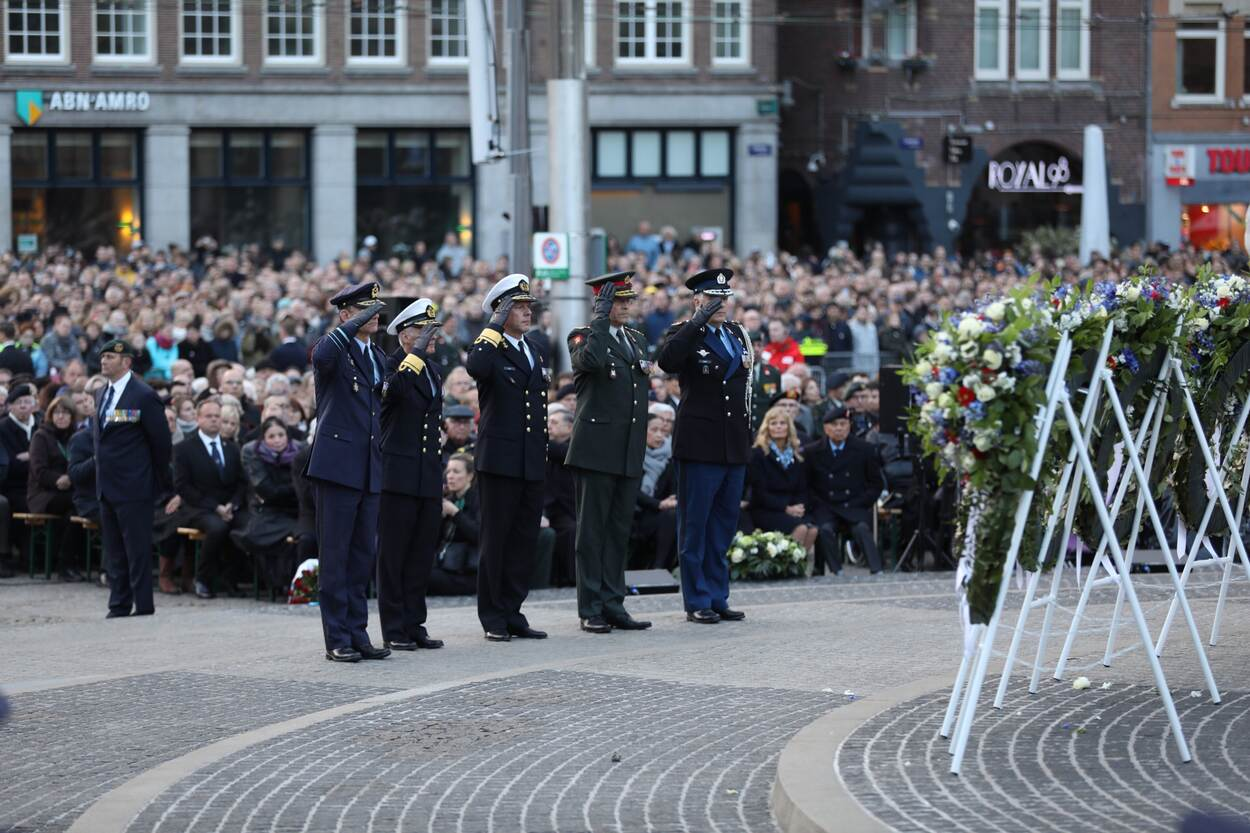
A Remembrance of the Dead ceremony in Amsterdam. The date of remembrance takes place in May.

In the Netherlands, Remembrance of the Dead is commemorated annually on 4 May. It is not a public holiday. Throughout the country, military personnel and civilians fallen in various conflicts since World War II are remembered. The main ceremonies are at the Waalsdorpervlakte near The Hague, the Grebbeberg near Wageningen and Dam Square in Amsterdam. Two minutes of silence are observed at 8:00 pm. Remembrance Day is followed by Liberation Day on 5 May.

=== Norway ===
In Norway the Norwegian Armed Forces commemorate Veteran's Day. The Norwegian Parliament, the Storting, decreed that Veteran's Day would be observed on the same day as Victory in Europe Day, in Norway known as "Frigjøringsdagen", or Liberation Day. The ceremonies are held annually in Akershus Fortress, with the King of Norway, Harald V, present. The first of such ceremonies was held on 8 May 2011, with two Norwegian Special Forces Operators being awarded the War Cross for deployments in the recent War in Afghanistan. The ceremonies are observed with memorials and military salutes.

=== Poland ===
Polish Independence Day is celebrated on 11 November, and is a public holiday. Although the holiday occurs on the same day as Remembrance Day in the Commonwealth, the holiday is intended to celebrate the independence of Poland and the regaining of freedom and unity for the Polish people after 123 years of partitioning.

However, some commemorations for war dead do occur on Polish Independence Day, as the independence of Poland was caused by the end of the First World War. Major events include laying flowers on the Tomb of the Unknown Soldier by members of the government and highest authorities, other public ceremonies and church services and school commemorations.

=== Romania ===
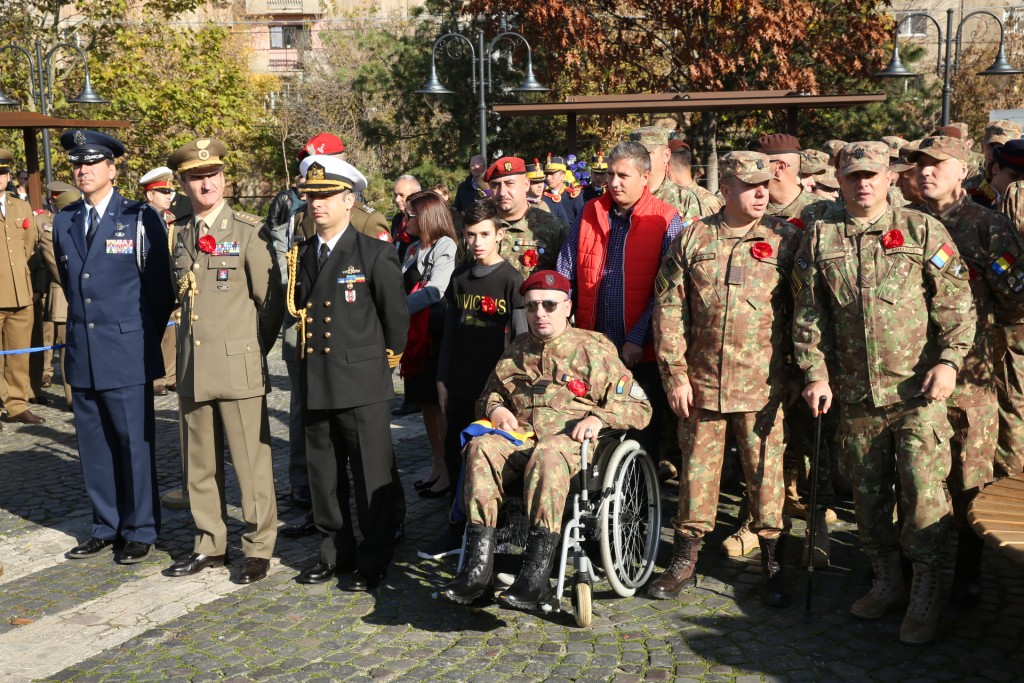
Romanian Veterans' Day on 11 November 2019

Since 2007, the War Veterans Day is commemorated on 29 April in Romania. The date was chosen as 29 April 1902 was the date when King Carol I established the title of "war veteran" for soldiers that fought in the War of Independence. Since 2014, Romania also commemorates Veterans' Day on 11 November, known as the Combat Theatre Veterans Day, marking both the armistice of Compiègne and the end of World War I, as well as the day when the first Romanian soldier was killed during the war in Afghanistan – 11 November 2003. Since 2015, the Romanian peony is worn on both occasions similarly to the remembrance poppy.

=== South Korea ===
The "Turn to Busan" remembrance ceremony has occurred at the United Nations Memorial Cemetery on 11 November annually since 2007. The ceremony commemorates veterans and war dead from 22 countries that fought under the United Nations Command during the Korean War. The ceremony was conceived by Vincent Courtenay, a Canadian veteran of the conflict. At Seoul Anglican Cathedral and Busan Anglican Cathedtal, the Eucharist to honour Korean War Veterans are held.

=== Sri Lanka ===
Remembrance Day in Sri Lanka, also known as the National War heroes commemoration day, marks the capitulation of the Liberation Tigers of Tamil Eelam (LTTE) and the end to the Sri Lankan Civil War on 18 May 2009. The day is a war heroes commemoration day as well as a remembrance day for civilians who died in the war from both sides. The celebrations are marked by speeches and a moment of silence. From its inception, under President Mahinda Rajapaksa, in 2010 the day was known as Victory Day and originally included a military parade, but in 2015 the day was renamed Remembrance Day by President Maithripala Sirisena.

== Similarly named holidays ==
=== Marshall Islands ===
In the Marshall Islands, Nuclear Victims' Day and Nuclear Survivors' Day occurs on March 1 and is a national holiday. The day honours the victims and survivors of nuclear testing done in the area in the 1950s.

== See also ==
- Armed Forces Day – National holidays honoring military forces
- For the Fallen (poem) – 1914 poem by Laurence Binyon
- Heroes' Day – National holiday in many countries
- Remembrance Day bombing – 1987 Provisional IRA terror attack in Enniskillen, Northern Ireland
- The Soldier (poem) – 1915 poem by Rupert Brooke
- The Unknown Warrior – Unidentified British soldier killed in WWI
- Tomb of the Unknown Soldier – Monument commemorating fallen soldiers
- Victory Day – Public holiday to commemorate a nation's victory

== General references ==
- Royal New Zealand Returned and Services Association
- Commemoration – Red poppies Archived
- Royal Canadian Legion
- Returned & Services League of Australia
- South African Legion
- Canadian Poppy Coin
