= Hong Kong Air Cadet Corps =

Voluntary organisation

- Hong Kong Air Cadet Corps Emblem
- Formation: 7 April 1971
- Type: Aviation
- Purpose: (a) To provide an organization to encourage and aid the people of Hong Kong in their contribution of their efforts, services and resources in the development of civil aviation; (b) To encourage and develop by example the voluntary contribution of private citizens to the public welfare; (c) To develop within the youth of Hong Kong, by example and inspiration, the qualities of leadership and good moral character; and (d) To promote international goodwill by participating in exchange programmes, rallies, conferences and other activities with overseas youth organisations.
- Headquarters: Hong Kong Air Cadet Corps Headquarters and Training Center
- Location: Wan Chai, Shiu Fai Terrace, 1F號, Wan Chai, Hong Kong
- Members: 3263 cadets (youth) with 1588 adult members
- Official language: Cantonese, English
- Commanding Officer: Group Captain CHAN Man-lang IDSM
- Website: www.aircadets.org.hk

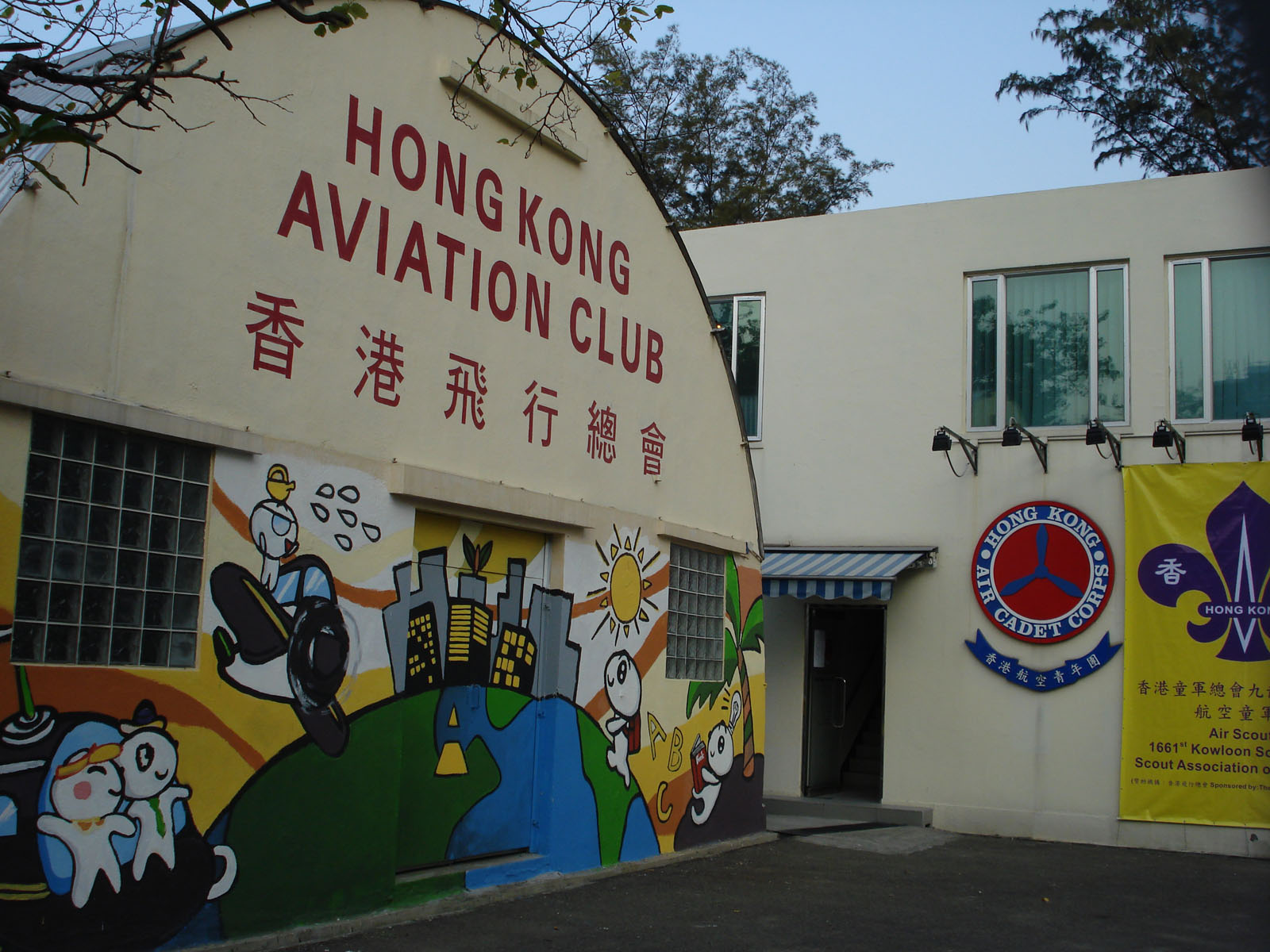
Hong Kong Air Cadet Corps head office at Kai Tak Airport, next to the Hong Kong Aviation Club head office

Hong Kong Air Cadet Corps
- Traditional Chinese: 香港航空青年團
- Simplified Chinese: 香港航空青年团
Transcriptions
Standard Mandarin
- Hanyu Pinyin: Xiānggǎng Hángkōng Qīngniántuán
Yue: Cantonese
- Jyutping: hoeng1 gong2 hong4 hung1 cing1 nin4 tyun4

The Hong Kong Air Cadet Corps (Chinese: 香港航空青年團) is a voluntary uniformed group (although employees working at headquarters are paid) subsidised by the Home Affairs Bureau of the Hong Kong government and is registered under the Societies Ordinance as a non-profit making charitable organisation.

Created in 1971 with ties to the British Armed Forces, Royal Air Force, Air Training Corps, it is an aviation-orientated, disciplined youth organisation; aiming to provide its members with initial aviation education, to develop their leadership capabilities and to promote their social awareness through community service. It is also an organisation supported by Cathay Pacific Airways and Government Flying Service for aviation training.

Apart from training in aviation knowledge, the HKACC also organises outdoor activities such as parachuting, rifle drill, familiarisation visits, hiking, night journeys, field training camp, and even flag days. In the summer, canoe courses and other aquatic activities are organised. In addition members of the Corps are obliged to take part in community service.

They are divided into 7 wings, Hong Kong Island, New Territories East, New Territories West, Kowloon East, Kowloon West, No 6 and Operations Support Wings. Those wings are further divided into squadrons; each squadron consists of a minimum of 35 cadets. Most of the squadrons are based at secondary schools for recruitment and training purposes.

== History ==
The HKACC was formed 7 April 1971. Initially associated with the Royal Air Force, the HKACC was civilianised with the 1997 handover of Hong Kong. Since 2024, the HKACC has been partially funded by the Government Flying Service.

== Organisation ==
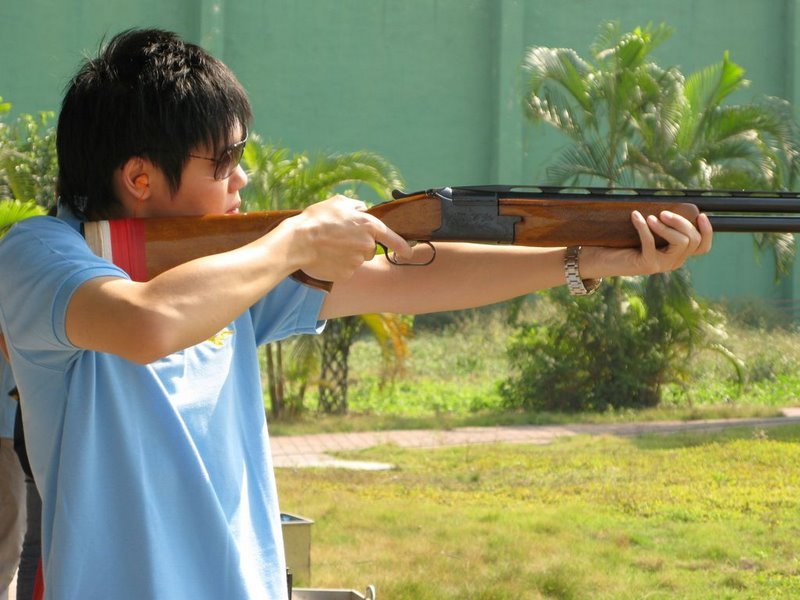
Hong Kong Air Cadet on a shooting exercise.

The Commanding Officer of the Hong Kong Air Cadet Corps is Group Captain Chan Man Lang. As HKACC chief executive officer, the Commanding Officer is responsible to the Executive Board for the Corps day-to-day operations.

The Commanding Officer Office co-ordinates a number of specialist functions at headquarters level, namely administration of the Honorary Officers Scheme; legal affairs; vocational qualifications; and liaison with the British and Canadian Air Cadet Organisations.

The Administration & Support Group discharges the administrative and support functions necessary for the daily running of the Corps. Its portfolio encompasses the routine administrative function of capital project, personnel, financial and properties management; organisation of adventure activities; information technology; interface with government policy bureaux and funding agencies; public affairs; logistics and supplies; and medical support.

The missions of the Institutional Advancement Group include liaison with the Central Government, government departments, mainland organisations, parents and other uniformed groups; international and mainland exchanges; and special developmental projects.

The Operations Group is in direct command of the five operational wings, and is responsible for organising and co-ordinating the activities of cadet and university squadrons. The Operations Group sees to that the functioning of its subordinate units are in line with the training objectives set out by the Headquarters, and that the Corps community services commitments are satisfactorily fulfilled.

The Training Group establishes the training standards and syllabus within the Corps. Such standards are constantly updated in light of community needs and technical advancements. The Training Group also runs advanced and specialist courses such as aviation education programmes; adult training; cadet non-commissioned officer training; and skills training.

The Flying Squadron organises air experience activities for the Corps. It also oversees flight operations and flight safety according to Civil Aviation standards.

== Structure ==
Most of the cadet squadrons of the Hong Kong Air Cadet Corps are part of the Operations Group, which is divided into four wings, and the Ceremonial Squadron under Ceremonial Wing, Training Group.

Group	Administration Group (Admin Gp)	Training Group (Trg Gp)	Development and Support Group (SD&S Gp)	Operations Group (Ops Gp)	Aviation Education and Development Group (AE&D Gp)
DCO	DCO Admin Wg Cdr W W S CHAN	DCO Trg Wg Cdr R K P KWONG	DCO SD&S Ag Wg Cdr F C CHAN	DCO Ops Wg Cdr A Y W LAW	DCO AE&D Wg Cdr I P K CHAN
OC Group	OC Admin Gp Vacant	OC Trg Gp Sqn Ldr J C Y CHAN	OC SD&S Gp Sqn Ldr V Y K AU	OC Ops Gp Sqn Ldr B K P YUEN	OC AE&D Gp Sqn Ldr F W C TSE

Administration Group

- Medical Squadron
- Adventure Activities Squadron
- Supply Flight
- Public Affairs Flight

Training Group

- Adult Training Wing
- Ceremonial Wing
- Vocational Qualifications Unit

Skills Development and Support Group

- Support Services Wing
- General Service Training Wing
- Skills Development Wing
- Community and Mainland Activities Wing

Operations Group

Wing	Hong Kong Island Wing							
OC Wing	OC HKI Wg Sqn Ldr M K B CHOI							
Squadron	101 Squadron	102 Squadron	103 Squadron	104 Squadron	105 Squadron	106 Squadron	107 Squadron	108 Squadron
Location	Hong Kong University Graduate Association College	Causeway Bay Community Centre	Unknown	Buddhist Federation Youth Center	Unknown	Unknown	St. Peter's Secondary School	The Church of Christ in China Kwei Wah Shan College

Wing	Kowloon Wing											
OC Wing	OC Kln Wg Ag Sqn Ldr E S C CHIU											
Squadron	201 Squadron	202 Squadron	203 Squadron	213 Squadron	401 Squadron	402 Squadron	403 Squadron	404 Squadron	405 Squadron	406 Squadron	407 Squadron	408 Squadron
Location	Hong Kong Taoist Federation Yunquan School	Vacant	HKTA The Yuen Yuen Institute No.3 Secondary School & Sheung Tak Community Hall, Tseung Kwan O	QualiEd College	Unknown	HQ	Wah Yan College, Kowloon	HKMA David Li Kwok Po College	Immigration Department Training and Youth Development Centre	Unknown	Vacant	Yu Chun Keung Memorial College

Wing	New Territories Wing												
OC Wing	OC NT Wg Sqn Ldr W C F CHAN												
Squadron	301 Squadron	302 Squadron	303 Squadron	304 Squadron	308 Squadron	313 Squadron	3002 Flight	501 Squadron	502 Squadron	504 Squadron	505 Squadron	506 Squadron	507 Squadron
Location	CUHKFAA Chan Chun Ha Secondary School	Kwok Tak Seng Catholic Secondary School	Hong Kong Taoist Association The Yuen Yuen Institute No.2 Secondary School	Law Ting Pong Secondary School	Shatin Government Secondary School & Lam Tai Fai College	Sheng Kung Hui Tsang Shiu Tim Secondary School	Unknown	Queen Elizabeth School Old Students' Association Secondary School & YLPMSAA Tang Siu Tong Secondary School	Unknown	San Wui Commercial Society Secondary School	Stewards Ma Kam Ming Charitable Foundation Ma Ko Pan Memorial College	Queen's College Old Boys' Association Secondary School	Lai King Catholic Secondary School

Wing	No 6 Wing											
OC Wing	OC No 6 Wg Ag Sqn Ldr C T C O R											
Squadron	601 Squadron	602 Squadron	603 Squadron	604 Squadron	605 Squadron	606 Squadron	607 Squadron	608 Squadron	609 Squadron	Central Training Squadron	6010 Flight	6011 Flight
Location	Sir Ellis Kadoorie Secondary School (West Kowloon)	HKU SPACE	Education University of Hong Kong	Chinese University of Hong Kong	Hong Kong University of Science and Technology	Police Sports Recreation Club	Lingnan University	Open University of Hong Kong	Hong Kong Polytechnic University	Lehua Catholic Primary School	UOW College Hong Kong	IVE (Tsing Yi)

Aviation Education and Development Group

- Aviation Education Wing
- Flying Squadron
- Technical Operations & Support Wing
- Development Unit

== Ranks ==
Ranks and Insignia of HKACC Officers
	Air Officer	Senior Officers			Junior Officers		
Rank	Air Commodore (Air Cdre)	Group Captain (Gp Capt)	Wing Commander (Wg Cdr)	Squadron Leader (Sqn Ldr)	Flight Lieutenant (Flt Lt)	Flying Officer (Fg Off)	Pilot Officer (Plt Off)
Insignia							

Ranks and Insignia of HKACC Warrant Officer and Instructors
	Warrant Officer	Instructors	
Rank	Warrant Officer (WO)	Sergeant Instructor (Sgt Instr)	Instructor (Instr)
Insignia			

Ranks and Insignia of HKACC Trainees
Ranks	Officer Cadets (Off Cdt)	Officer Trainee (OT)	Recruit Instructor (RI)
Insignia			

Ranks and Insignia HKACC Cadets
	Senior Non-commissioned Officer (SNCO)			Junior Non-commissioned Officer (JNCO)		Cadets	
Rank	Cadet Warrant Officer (CWO)	Cadet Flight Sergeant (FS)	Cadet Sergeant (Sgt)	Cadet Corporal (Cpl)	Cadet Lance Corporal (LCpl)	Basic Cadet (BC)	Recruit Cadet (RC)
Insignia							

== Advanced Aviation Education Programme (AAEP) Scholarship ==
The AAEP was first introduced in 1997 and available only to members of HKACC and other uniformed youth organisations. In 2000, AAEP opened its door to the general public and it was in that year that Cathay Pacific Airways became the co-organiser of the Programme. The Community College of City University (now UOW College Hong Kong) joined as the third co-organiser. The Programme aims to provide the participants with the ground training necessary to take the Australian Civil Aviation Safety Authority General Flying Practical Test (GFPT).

Participants who passed all assessments will be awarded with a Certificate of Achievement issued by HKACC. AAEP graduates can apply for credit exemption when applying for the Associate Degree of Science in Airport Operations and Aviation Logistics (AScAOAL) offered by the UOW College Hong Kong. HKACC cadets who have passed the Programme will be deemed to have passed all Aviation Education (AE) subjects as required for the achievement of the Senior Cadet and Staff Cadet classifications.

Participants must complete the following 8 compulsory subjects divided into two modules which comprise a total of 20 sessions:

Technical modules

- Aerodynamics (ADY)
- Aircraft general Knowledge (AGK)
- Operation, performance and planning (PERF)
- Flight rules & air laws in Australia (LAW)

Navigation Modules

- Navigation (NAV)
- Meteorology (MET)
- Radio Communication (RT)
- Human Performance and Limitation (HPL)

Practical module

- Flight Simulation Training*(FST) conducted by instructors of the New Zealand (HK) Flight Training Academy

== Activities ==
Cadets in the HKACC take part in the International Air Cadet Exchange and international shooting contests.

== Fleet ==
Helicopters used for flight experience in Hong Kong include:

- Robinson R44
- Eurocopter EC120

Glider training is provided by Canada/Australia and private flying clubs in Canada / New Zealand.

== See also ==
- Cadets (youth program)
