= CCCU =

CCCU is an abbreviation that can refer to:

- Council for Christian Colleges and Universities
- Canterbury Christ Church University
- Churches of Christ in Christian Union
- Community College of City University
