= HKMA David Li Kwok Po College =

Secondary school in Hong Kong

HKMA David Li Kwok Po College.
- 香港管理專業協會李國寶中學

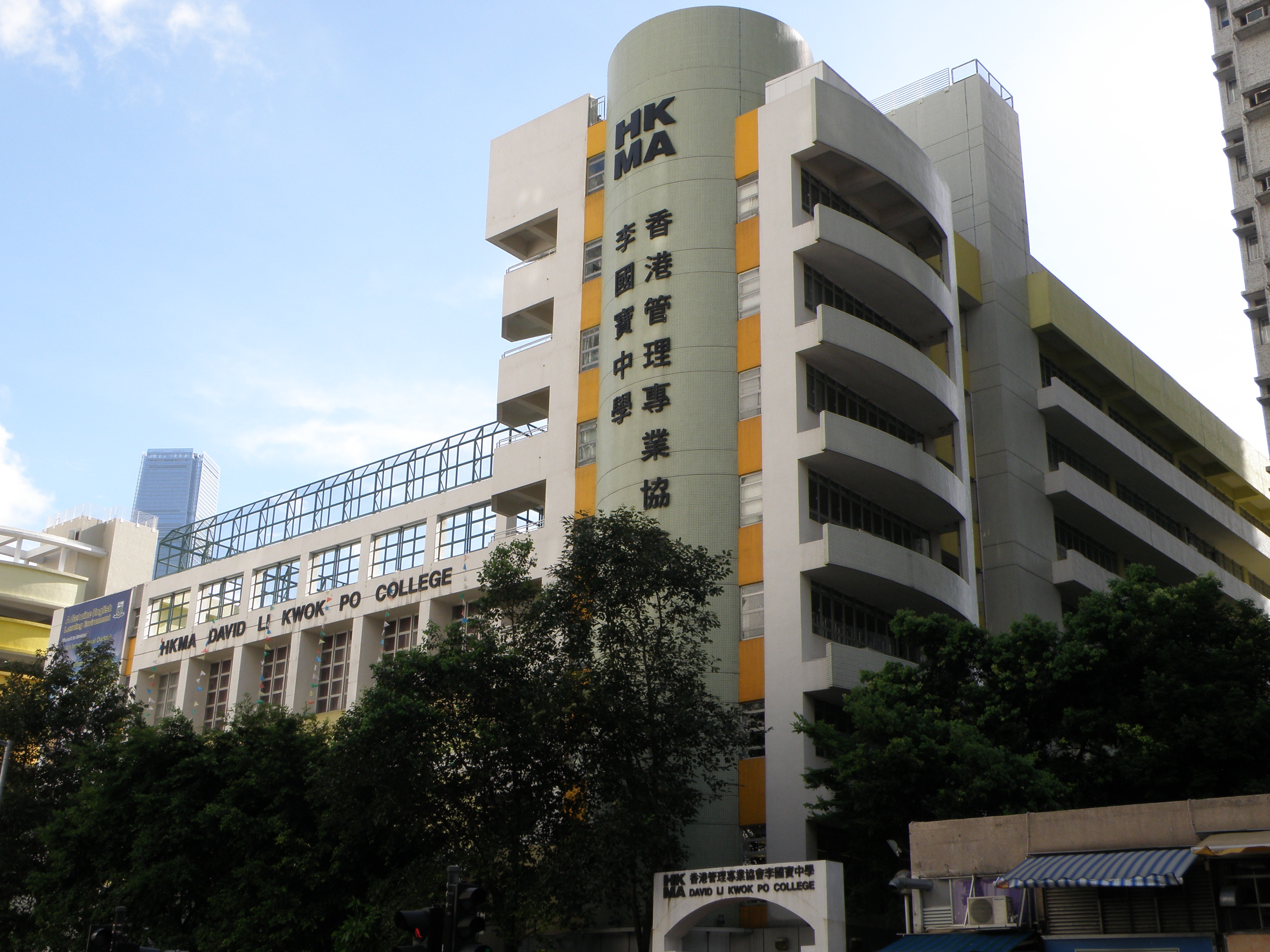

Location
- 8 Hoi Wang Road; Mong Kok (West), Kowloon; Hong Kong
- Coordinates: 22.3140°N 114.1637°E

Information
- Funding type: Direct Subsidy Scheme
- Motto: 追求卓越 (In Search of Excellence)
- Established: 1 September 2000; 25 years ago
- Superintendent: Michael Tien Puk Sun
- Principal: Dennis Mok
- Teaching staff: 74
- Grades: Junior Secondary (S.1–3); Senior Secondary (S.4–6)
- Enrolment: 800
- Language: English
- Campus size: 8,000 square metres (86,000 sq ft)
- Campus type: Urban
- Student Union/Association: Veritas
- Colour: Rainbow
- Affiliations: Hong Kong Management Association
- Website: www.hkmadavidli.edu.hk

HKMA David Li Kwok Po College
- Traditional Chinese: 香港管理專業協會李國寶中學
- Simplified Chinese: 香港管理专业协会李国宝中学
Transcriptions
Standard Mandarin
- Hanyu Pinyin: Xiānggǎng Guǎnlǐ Zhuānyè Xiéhuì Lǐ Guóbǎo Zhōngxué
Yue: Cantonese
- Jyutping: hoeng1 gong2 gun2 lei5 zyun1 jip6 hip3 wui6*2 lei5 gwok3 bou2 zung1 hok6

HKMA David Li Kwok Po College is a band 1 directly subsidised (DSS) secondary school in Hong Kong, using English as the primary medium of instruction.

Founded in 2000, HKMA David Li Kwok Po College provides biliterate, trilingual and multicultural education to learners in Hong Kong. As an English-medium-of-instruction school, all school subjects are taught in English, except Chinese language and Chinese History, which are taught in Cantonese.

The college's teachers come from Anglophone countries such as Canada, Malaysia, France, India and the UK. Since 2010, the College has maintained a ratio whereby more than 15% of their teaching staff has been recruited from outside of Hong Kong. Furthermore, 100% of its teaching staff possess recognized university degrees.

== Former Principal ==
In 25 years, 9 principals have served at HKMA David Li Kwok Po College, resulting in an average duration of only 2.78 years for each principal, which includes:

Dr. Pong, Wing-yan (2002 - 2007)

Mr. Nicholas Puiu (2007 - 2014)

Mr. Lawerence Law (2014 - 2016)

Ms. Tracy Cheung (2016 - 2022)

Ms. Elisa Wong (2022 - 2024)

Mr. Dennis Mok (2024–Present)

== The Student Council ==
Opened in 2012, the college has set up a Student Council as a representative of the student body as a whole. The aims of the council are:

- To develop a sense of belonging and a good practice of citizenship in students through the involvement and the organization of activities.
- To reflect the opinions of our schoolmates to the school and enhance the relationship between teachers and the students.
- To strive for the welfare of our schoolmates
- To hold diversified internal school activities and encourage our schoolmates to participate.
- To encourage our schoolmates to show concern about others in the society.
- To enhance friendships among schoolmates
- To act as role models to the students of the school.
- To broaden the students horizons through joint school activities.

== About Abelia ==
The HKMADLKP Abelia Student Council(Abelia's Website) was a vibrant and proactive student organization (2021-2022) at the HKMA David Li Kwok Po College. The council was dedicated to representing the interests of the student body, organizing a variety of events, and fostering a positive and inclusive school environment. The council's mission was to enhance the overall student experience by promoting engagement, leadership, and community spirit. Through their initiatives, the Abelia Student Council aimed to create a supportive and dynamic atmosphere where every student could thrive.

The council strived for the welfare of schoolmates by negotiating with shops and vendors, successfully securing over 300 discounts for students. They also reflected the opinions of their peers to the school administration, enhancing the relationship between teachers and students.

The Abelia Student Council organized various activities to promote all-round personality development and increased student involvement. Some of these activities included:

- Halloween Activities - Christmas Talent Fiesta - Red Packets of Love - Academic Cup - Teachers and Students Talent Fiesta

These activities not only provided valuable learning experiences but also helped to build a strong sense of camaraderie among students.

== Extracurricular activities ==
In the 2022–2023 school year, the college offered more activities, including:

- Academic Clubs: Chinese Culture, English, Mathematics, Science, French
- Interest Clubs: Art, Board Game, Coding, Campus TV, Chess, Dance, Hiking, Home Economics Club, Japanese, Korean, Magic, Orienteering, Panda Cafe, Reading, Sky Teen Volunteer, 3D Modeling
- Uniform Groups: Hong Kong Red Cross, Hong Kong Air Cadet Corps
- Sports Clubs: Athletics, Badminton, Basketball, Cheerleading, Football, Table Tennis, Volleyball
- Music Items: Flute, Clarinet, Saxophone, Trumpet and Horn, Handchime, Euphonium & Tuba, Percussion, Acoustic Guitar

During holidays and school breaks, the College organizes overseas study tours (e.g. linguistic and cultural immersion experiences in the UK, Australia, Singapore, South Korea, Vietnam, Malaysia, Cambodia, Germany, Japan, Canada, Taiwan, New Zealand, France and Mainland China).

== The Hong Kong Management Association ==
Established in 1960, the Hong Kong Management Association (HKMA) is a non-profit making organisation whose core activity is professional education. The HKMA has been in service in Hong Kong for 50 years. With a membership of more than 13,000 executives, HKMA organises more than 2,000 programmes for more than 50,000 participants annually. Apart from adult education, the HKMA is also concerned with educating Hong Kong's younger population. HKMA David Li Kwok Po College opened in 2000, the second school founded and administered by the HKMA. Dr the Hon David K. P. Li GBM GBS JP, Chairman and Chief Executive of the Bank of East Asia Limited, is the past Chairman of the HKMA.
