= Ceremonial Squadron =

Ceremonial Squadron of Hong Kong Air Cadet Corps

- The Ceremonial Squadron of Hong Kong Air Cadet Corps
- Formation: 1 May 1999
- Officer Commanding Ceremonial Squadron: Flying Officer Roy Y L CHAN
- Website: https://www.facebook.com/TCSQN/?ref=page_internal

The Ceremonial Squadron ("C Sqn") is the HQ Unit of Training Group of the Hong Kong Air Cadet Corps.

== History ==
The Ceremonial Squadron was created December 1998 and officially established on 1 May 1999. The unit has gained recognition of high standard of drill on its debut performance on the Hong Kong Cadet Force Joint Annual Parade on 7 November 1999 at Hong Kong Police Training School. Moreover, it is the first time the air cadets have an escorting unit to the HKACC Colour equipped with ceremonial dress (No.1 Service Dress). Ceremonial Squadron is under the training group of the Hong Kong Air Cadet Corps.

Before the formation of Ceremonial Squadron, its prior is named as The Ceremonial Flight (C Flt), as an Headquarters Unit of Training Group which was led by Flight Lieutenant Sandy S.F. Chu, Officer Commanding Ceremonial Flight with the assistance of Warrant Officer Wallace W.K. Yip, Chief Drill Instructor. C Flt commits to perform all ceremonials by forming up the Guards of Honour including Colour Party if required. The C Flt is also responsible for escorting the HKACC Colour on all occasions. On 1 October 2003, C Flt was promoted to Squadron level and gain its name of Ceremonial Squadron (C Sen). Nowadays, Ceremonial Squadron as its accessor, also rendered same ceremonial duties to discharge.

== Ceremonial Squadron Officers ==
The Commanding Officer has authorised the establishment of Ceremonial Squadron on 1 October 2003. Acting Squadron Leader Gavin T. C. Loo was the Officer Commanding Squadron and the Ceremonial Squadron is authorised as the only unit to parade the HKACC Colour by forming up a Colour Party as well as escorting flights as required. The current Officer Commanding of Ceremonial Squadron is Fg Off Marco P Y WAN.

Picture	Officer Commanding Ceremonial Squadron	Took office	Left office	Time in office
Gavin T C LOO	Acting squadron leader Gavin T C LOO	10 January 2003	30 September 2004	1 year, 8 months
Bruce C H LEE	Flight lieutenant Bruce C H LEE	1 October 2004	31 March 2009	4 years, 5 months
Jethro C Y CHAN	Flight lieutenant Jethro C Y CHAN	1 April 2009	4 April 2012	3 years
Edward C K KING	Flight lieutenant Edward C K KING	5 April 2012	30 September 2016	4 years, 5 months
Twinson H B CHAU	Flight lieutenant Twinson H B CHAU	1 October 2016	31 December 2017	1 year, 2 months
Edward C K KING	Flight lieutenant Edward C K KING	1 January 2018	1 October 2018	9 months
Marco P Y WAN	Flying officer Marco P Y WAN	1 October 2018	31 March 2021	2 years, 5 months
Roy Y L CHAN	Flying officer Roy Y L CHAN	1 April 2021	Current	3 years, 11 months

== Functions of the Ceremonial Squadron ==
Ceremonial Squadron performs at public duties such as Remembrance Sunday at Cenotaph, Ceremonial Drill Display and National Day Flag Raising at the Hong Kong Museum of Coastal Defence as well as other major public performances such as Solar Project and the Aviation Day were under its scope. At some occasions, the Squadron also provide Lining Party for certain organizations' activities. As such, the Squadron was gradually equipped with full ceremonial accoutrements i.e. RAF No.1 Service Dress for all senior and cadet members, ceremonial swords for officers and warrant officers and replica drill-purpose rifles for all cadets.

== See also ==
- Hong Kong Sea Cadet Corps
- Hong Kong Adventure Corps
