= Hong Kong University Graduate Association College =

HKUGA College
- 港大同學會書院

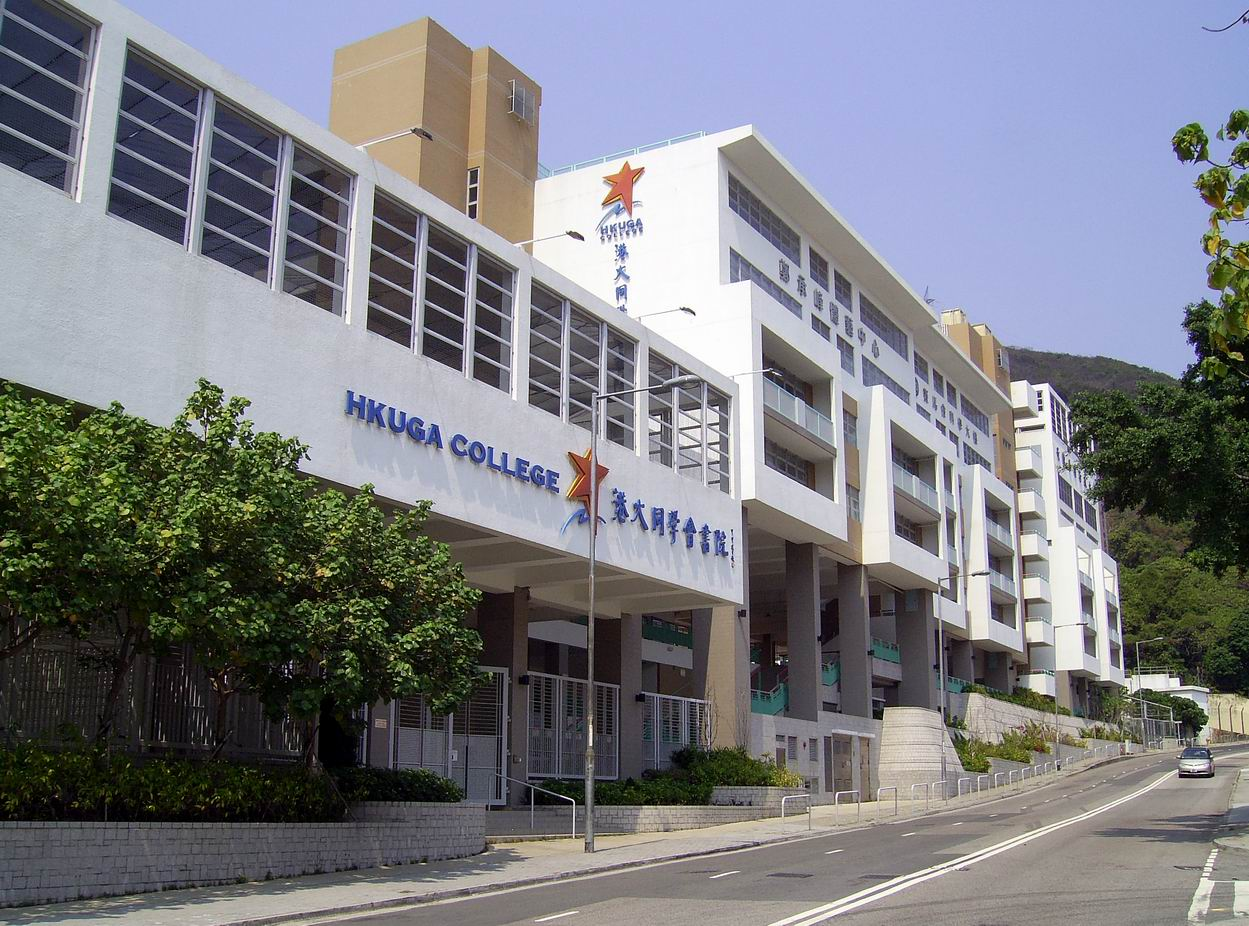

Location
- No.9 Nam Fung Road, Wong Chuk Hang, Hong Kong; 22.251577°N 114.174776°E

Information
- School type: DSS, secondary school
- Motto: Strive for Virtue, Quest for Truth (明德惟志 格物惟勤)
- Established: 2006; 20 years ago
- Founder: HKUGA Education Foundation
- School district: Southern District
- Principal: Ms. Corina Chen
- Staff: About 120
- Grades: G7(Secondary 1) - G12 (Secondary 6)
- Enrollment: About 900
- Classes: 36
- Language: English
- Website: www.hkugac.edu.hk

Hong Kong University Graduate Association College or HKUGA College (HKUGAC; Chinese: 港大同學會書院) is a secondary school located at No. 9 Nam Fung Road, Wong Chuk Hang, Hong Kong. It was one of the schools under the Direct Subsidy Scheme in Hong Kong.

== History ==
It was founded in 2006 by the Hong Kong University Graduates Association. The Hong Kong University Graduates Association Education Foundation is a registered non-profit-making organization founded by members of the Hong Kong University Graduates Association, alumni of The University of Hong Kong (HKU), and other members of society. The foundation consists of nearly 200 members and is managed by an elected Executive Committee.

== School Emblem ==
The school emblem is an orange star with a blue wave on its leg and is shaped to look like its dancing. According to the school website, the star stands for:

- Leadership and Inspiration
- A child dancing with the delight of learning
- A new mode of quality education in the new millennium
- Dynamics, energy and creativity

== Curriculum ==
=== Junior Secondary Level (S1 - S3) ===
The 8 Key Learning Areas of the curriculum are Chinese Language, English Language, Mathematics, Science, Technology, Citizenship, Economics and Society (CES), Technology and Living, Geography, History, Visual Arts, and Physical Education. Increasing interest in reading and different cultures are focuses of the cirriculum. Events surrounding community services are also conducted in school and around Hong Kong for students to participate

‘Excursion’, a mandatory one-week trip, usually overseas, is held every year as a promotion for immersive cultural learning. Students learn about cultures and traditions of other regions through these trips, broadening their horizons. A cross-cultural project is usually performed by students in groups to be presented back at school.

=== Senior Secondary Level (S4 - S6) ===
HKUGA College follows the Hong Kong Diploma of Secondary Education (HKDSE) cirriculum in its senior secondary level, managed by the Hong Kong Examinations and Assessment Authority (HKEAA). Four mandatory classes, and most often three, occasionally two electives are chosen by students at the end of their third year to be studied in the entirety of their senior secondary level. The four mandatory classes include Chinese Language, English Language, Mathematics Compulsory Part, and Citizenship and Social Development (after 2024 HKDSE, in lieu of Liberal Studies). The electives typically include History, Economics, Biology, Chemistry, Physics, Visual Arts, Geography, Chinese History, Chinese Literature, Literature in English, Business, Accounting and Financial Studies, Music and Physical Education, although the availability varies depending on the year and staff present to teach.

== 10th Anniversary ==
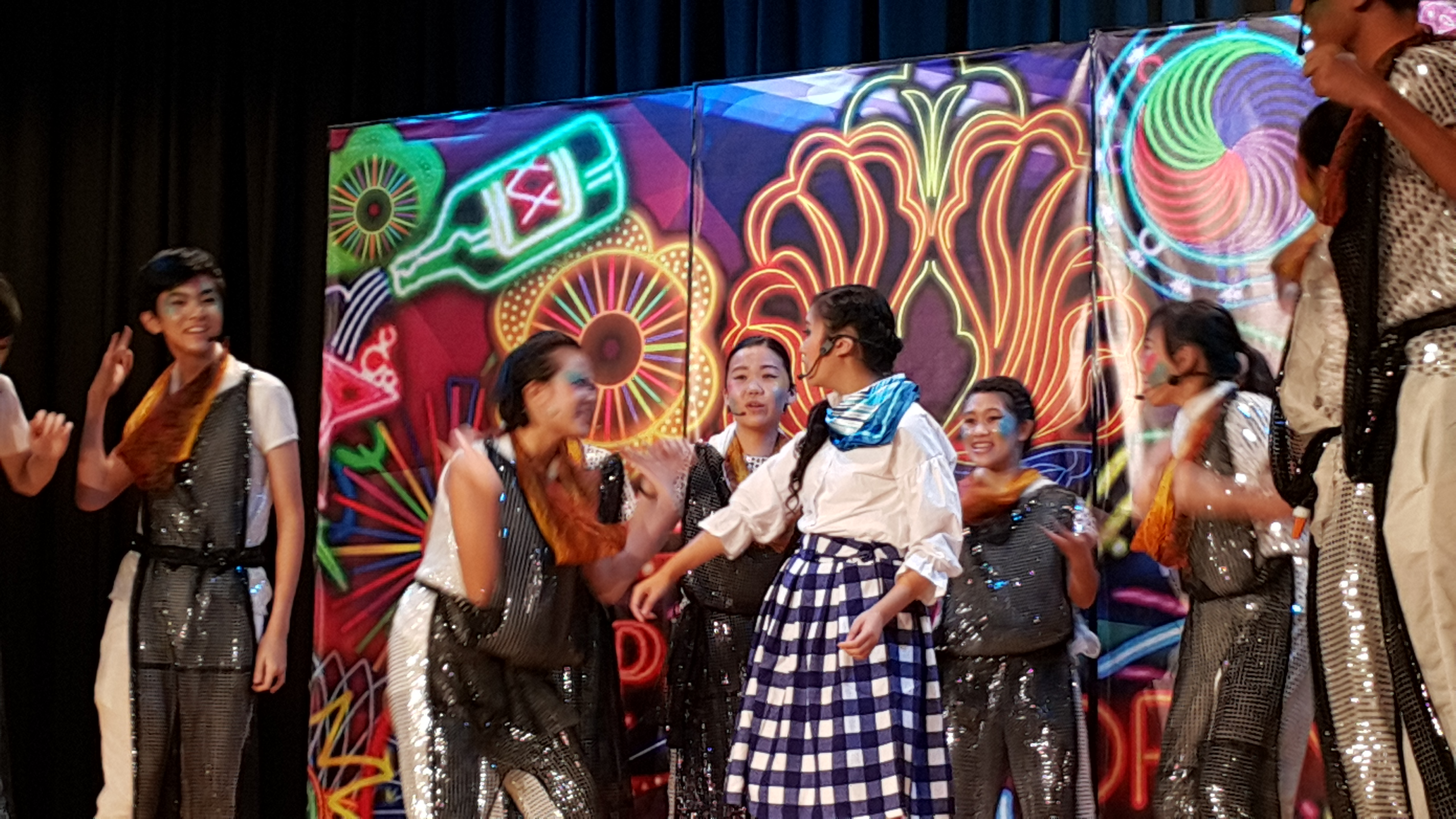
The musical play was performed in the 10th-anniversary ceremony.

HKUGAC's 10th Anniversary Open Day celebrations was held on the 5th and 6 December 2015. The school campus was opened to the public. It was estimated that 3000 visitors in total toured the campus. Students performed a lion dance, singing etc. for the visitors in the Opening Ceremony. A musical play named "Extravaganza" was arranged in the Closing Ceremony.

== See also ==
- Education in Hong Kong
- List of secondary schools in Hong Kong
