= UOW College Hong Kong =

Private college in New Territories, Hong Kong

- 香港伍倫貢學院
- Type: Self-financed higher education institution
- Established: 2004; 22 years ago
- Affiliations: University of Wollongong
- President: Currie TSANG
- Vice-President: Dr. Charlie Choi
- Students: ~3,000
- Location: Kowloon, Hong Kong
- Campus: *UOW College Hong Kong, 1/F, 18 Che Kung Miu Road, Tai Wai, New Territories, Hong Kong (adjacent to Phase 3 of Pavilia Farm)
- Website: uowchk.edu.hk

Chinese name
- Simplified Chinese: 香港伍伦贡学院
- Traditional Chinese: 香港伍倫貢學院
Transcriptions
Standard Mandarin
- Hanyu Pinyin: Xiānggǎng Wǔlúngòng Xuéyuàn
Yue: Cantonese
- Yale Romanization: Hēung góng ńgh leùhn gung hohk yuhn
- Jyutping: Hoeng^{1} gong^{2} ng^{5} leon^{4} gung^{3} hok^{6} jyun^{6}

UOW College Hong Kong (UOWCHK) is a private college in Tai Wai, New Territories, Hong Kong. It is part of the global network of the University of Wollongong in New South Wales, Australia.

The college was established as the Community College of City University in 2004. The college was renamed the UOW College Hong Kong in 2020. The medium of instruction is mainly English with some courses supplemented by Cantonese.

== History ==
=== Establishment ===
The Community College of City University, predecessor to UOWCHK, was established in 2004 as the Government announced a gradual phasing out of funding for sub-degree programmes.

=== Alliance with University of Wollongong ===
On 21 November 2014, the University of Wollongong (UOW) and City University of Hong Kong announced their partnership. The college was then renamed UOWCHK / CCCU and eventually in July 2020, the college was further renamed as UOW College Hong Kong.

CCCU successfully transitioned to UOWCHK after gaining approval as an independent accredited institute in 2019 under Hong Kong ordinance and officially separated from CityU in 2020 after a five-year transition period beginning from 2015. CityU will continue to focus on academia and pursue excellence in professional education and translational research while UOWCHK will further grow as a degree granting University/College with international connection.

UOWCHK receives full support of UOW with educational resources and commitment to develop and enhance student experience via opportunities for mobility and global exposure. UOW has launched top-up degrees in Hong Kong via UOWCHK.

== Current campus ==
=== Tai Wai Campus (new main campus) ===
The new UOWCHK Campus, officially opened on 15 September 2023, is located in Tai Wai adjacent to The Wai shopping mall and the Tai Wai MTR Station with an entrance separate from the mall. The new campus sits on land secured from the Hong Kong government in 2016 and has around 15,000 square meters of modern teaching space which includes a 200-seat auditorium, 100-seat lecture theaters, 30 small classrooms and purpose-built laboratories that can accommodate up to 3,300 students.

All students attending classes at the Tai Wai Campus will have access to campus facilities such as the learning commons, cafeteria, Gym and dance studio located on the 3rd floor. The 2nd floor UOWCHK library is accessible from both inside and outside the campus for UOW college students and Hong Kong secondary school student alike.

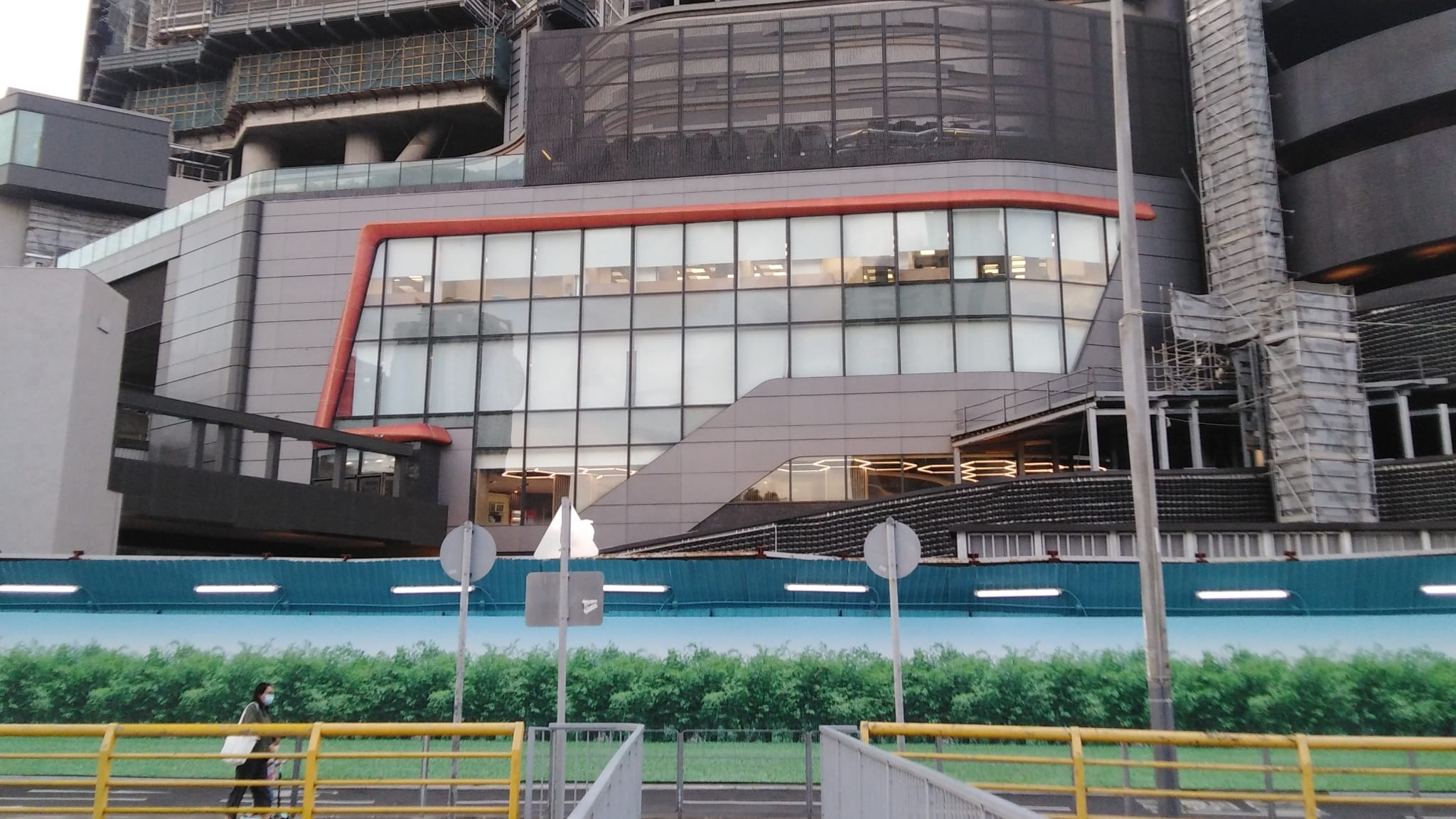
Tai Wai campus

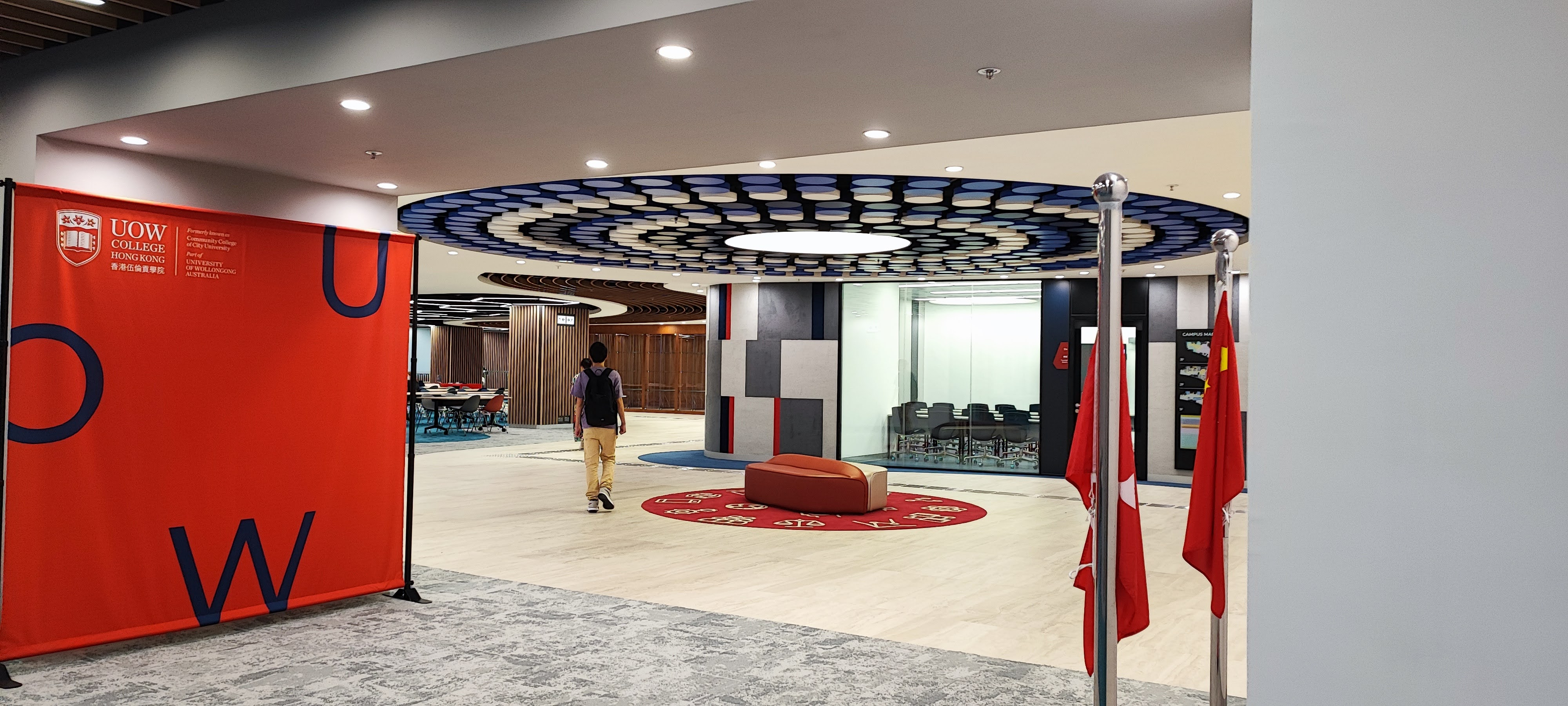
UOWCHK Tai Wai Campus interior view 1st floor.
