= Anonymous Signal =

2025 Hong Kong television series

- Also known as: 奪命提示
- Genre: Police procedural; Action; Mystery; Suspense
- Written by: Leung Yan-tung; Tong Kin-ping; Tam Kin-wai
- Directed by: Wong Sze-yuen; Ng Chiu-wing; Ho Sai-ho; Chan Kong-hung; Sze Chun-kit
- Starring: Joel Chan; Moon Lau; Owen Cheung; Tiffany Lau
- Opening theme: "Moving Forward" by Rock Ho
- Country of origin: Hong Kong
- Original language: Cantonese
- No. of episodes: 30

Production
- Producer: Jazz Boon
- Production location: Hong Kong
- Running time: 43 minutes
- Production company: TVB

Original release
- Network: myTV Super; TVB Jade
- Release: 17 March – 25 April 2025

Anonymous Signal (Chinese: 奪命提示; lit. 'Fatal Warning') is a Hong Kong police procedural television series produced by TVB, with Jazz Boon serving as the series' producer. It premiered on 17 March 2025 and ran for 30 episodes until 25 April 2025. Set against the backdrop of police investigations, the series blends action, suspense, and occasional comedic elements, and stars Joel Chan, Moon Lau, Owen Cheung, and Tiffany Lau. The story follows a team of officers as they confront complex crimes while deciphering cryptic, seemingly prophetic messages delivered by an artificial intelligence assistant named Julie—messages that alternately aid and manipulate their investigations.

== Cast ==
- Joel Chan as Kwok Pak-fei – Team Leader of the Major Crimes Unit, later appointed Chief Inspector of the Anonymous Signal Intelligence Bureau (ASIB), struggles with the fallout from a failed mission three years earlier
- Moon Lau as Keung Hey-man – Chief Inspector of the Criminal Intelligence Bureau (CIB), later Chief Inspector of ASIB; maintains a tense relationship with Pak-fei due to their mentor’s death
- Owen Cheung as Chiu Chun-long – undercover officer who infiltrates a human trafficking syndicate; later Senior Inspector of ASIB and seeks to rebuild his relationship with ex-girlfriend Wan Ka-lei
- Tiffany Lau as Wan Ka-lei – undercover officer, later Probationary Inspector of ASIB; navigates a strained relationship with Chiu Chun-long
- Jazz Lam as Lau Lik – a cheerful but unambitious police officer, later appointed Senior Police Constable of ASIB and a friend of Pak-fei and Hey-man
- Karl Ting as Fong Tsz-chiu – ASIB Inspector
- Rosita Kwok as Sheung Suen – Probationary Inspector at ASIB
- Amy Fan as Keung Tin-kiu – Hey-man's cousin
- Stephanie Au as Law Yui-yui – teenage daughter of the late Law Yau-bong, raised by Pak-fei, Hey-man, and Lau Lik
- Mary Hon as Chiu Cheung-ngo – Fong Tsz-chiu's mother
- Cheung Kwok-keung as Kwan Chun-yu – Assistant Commissioner of Police and corrupt insider aiding the mastermind
- Brian Tse as Lee Kin-wo – member of the ASIB team, later revealed as the creator of Julie and the mastermind behind the deadly games
- Lesley Chung as Tsz-yu – orphan adopted by Chiu Chun-long and Wan Ka-lei; frequently hospitalized due to leukemia
- Bob Cheung as Ling Lit – ruthless assassin working under Lee Kin-wo

== Plot ==
The series follows Chief Inspector Keung Hey-man (Moon Lau) of the Criminal Intelligence Bureau (CIB), who receives a cryptic message from an artificial intelligence assistant known as Julie that leads her to a dismembered body. The discovery is soon linked to an ongoing serial murder investigation led by Inspector Kwok Bak-fei (Joel Chan) of the Major Crimes Unit. In response, senior officials merge the two teams to form the Anonymous Signal Intelligence Bureau (ASIB), a new unit tasked with handling cases associated with Julie’s unexplained signals.

As the investigation progresses, Julie’s messages appear to predict future crimes but often misdirect or manipulate the unit. ASIB becomes involved in a range of cases, including the “Limb-Sawing Maniac” murders, incidents of spontaneous human combustion, desiccated remains found in abandoned buildings, and disappearances connected to a clandestine orphanage. Throughout these investigations, Hey-man and Bak-fei grapple with the unresolved consequences of a failed operation three years earlier, which resulted in the death of their mentor, the breakdown of their partnership, and lingering psychological strain.

Parallel to the main investigation, undercover officer Wan Ka-lei (Tiffany Lau) renews her complex relationship with Chiu Chun-long (Owen Cheung). The two care for their adopted daughter, Tsz-yu (Lesley Chung), a young girl battling leukemia, whose well-being becomes an emotional anchor for both characters. As ASIB examines the origins of Julie, suspicions of an internal mole arise, heightening tensions and undermining trust within the team.

The investigation ultimately identifies Lee Kin-wo (Brian Tse) as the architect behind Julie. Working with corrupt police insider Kwan Chun-yu (Cheung Kwok-keung) and hired assassin Ling Lit (Bob Cheung), Kin-wo uses Julie to orchestrate a series of coordinated crimes, manipulating both law enforcement and criminal groups.

In the concluding episodes, ASIB uncovers Kin-wo’s full plan, leading to a confrontation in an “ultimate game arena.” During the encounter, Lau Lik (Jazz Lam) is killed while protecting his colleagues, and Kin-wo is killed by Bak-fei in hand-to-hand combat. Although the network controlling Julie is dismantled, the series ends with the activation of a new system, Julie 2.0, implying that the underlying threat persists.

== Music ==
Track Listing
No.	Title	Lyrics	Music	Artist(s)	Length
1.	"Moving Forward (前行吧)"	Hayes Yeung	Alex Lau	Rock Ho	3:42
2.	"Still Wanna Believe You (仍然很想相信你)"	Hayes Yeung	Alex Lau	Shiga Lin	3:50
3.	"All Open Up (一切豁開)"	Hayes Yeung	Damon Chui	James Ng	3:25

== Ratings ==
The series drew 1.39 million viewers during its premiere week and 1.49 million for the finale. In the Google 2025 Search Rankings, it placed second in the "Trending Dramas and Programs" category. The series also ranked among the top 10 on Yahoo's 2025 list of "Most Searched Local TV Dramas" and placed third on DailyView's 2025 TVB popularity list, which measured "internet heat" based on online engagement across more than 20,000 websites and channels in Hong Kong and Macau. Engagement data from TVB's major social media platforms further indicated that Anonymous Signal was one of the three best-performing dramas in 2025 on those platforms.

Week	Episodes	Airing dates	Ratings (Note: According to Hong Kong's TV rating system, each rating point represents approximately 64,670 viewers.)		Ref.
Week	Episodes	Airing dates	Cross-platform peak ratings	Viewers	Ref.
1	1 – 5	17–21 March 2025	21.4 points	1.39 million	
2	6 – 10	24–28 March 2025	21.7 points	1.40 million	
3	11 – 15	31 March–4 April 2025	22.1 points	1.43 million	
4	16 – 20	7–11 April 2025	20.9 points	1.35 million	
5	21 – 25	14–18 April 2025	21.4 points	1.38 million	
6	26 – 30	21–25 April 2025	23 points	1.49 million	

== Awards and nominations ==
Year	Award	Category	Nominated work	Results	Ref.
2025	58th TVB Anniversary Awards	Best Television Series	Anonymous Signal	Nominated	
2025	58th TVB Anniversary Awards	Best Actor	Owen Cheung	Nominated	
2025	58th TVB Anniversary Awards	Best Actress	Moon Lau	Nominated	
2025	58th TVB Anniversary Awards	Best Supporting Actress	Tiffany Lau	Nominated	
2025	58th TVB Anniversary Awards	My Favorite Television Series (Greater Bay Area)	Anonymous Signal	Nominated	
2025	58th TVB Anniversary Awards	My Favorite Actor in a Leading Role (Greater Bay Area)	Owen Cheung	Nominated	
2025	58th TVB Anniversary Awards	My Favorite Actress in a Leading Role (Greater Bay Area)	Moon Lau	Nominated	
