= Structure of the Hong Kong Police Force =

The Hong Kong Police Force (HKPF) is structured into numerous bureaus and units. As a whole, it is commanded by the Commissioner of Police, who is assisted by three deputy commissioners. The "Deputy Commissioner – Operations" supervises all operational matters including crime. The "Deputy Commissioner – Management" is responsible for the direction and co-ordination of force management including personnel, training, and management services. The "Deputy Commissioner — National Security" is responsible for the National Security Department, which deals with acts of sedition, terrorism, and collusion with foreign governments.

For day-to-day policing (Operations), the Force is organised into six regions: Hong Kong Island; Kowloon East; Kowloon West; New Territories North; New Territories South; and Marine Region. The Force Headquarters (Management) is made up of five departments: Operations & Support; Crime & Security; Personnel & Training; Management Services; Finance, Administration & Planning.

Regions are largely autonomous in their day-to-day operation and management matters, and each has its own headquarters, which comprises administration and operation wings, Emergency Units, as well as traffic and criminal investigation units. Each region is divided into districts and divisions and, in a few cases, sub-divisions. Currently, there are 23 districts. The policing of Hong Kong Island, Kowloon and the main towns of the New Territories follows a similar pattern. Responsibility for law and order on the Mass Transit Railway, which runs through most police districts, lies with the Railway District.

Railway District, based in Kai Tak, is responsible for patrols on the MTR.

== Organization ==
Hong Kong Police Force
Commissioner of Police
Deputy Commissioner of Police	Deputy Commissioner of Police	Deputy Commissioner of Police
(Operations)	(Management)	(National Security)
Director of Operations	Director of Crime and Security	Director of Personnel and Training	Director of Management Services	Director of Finance Administration and Planning	Director of National Security
Senior Assistant Commissioner	Senior Assistant Commissioner	Senior Assistant Commissioner	Senior Assistant Commissioner	Administrative Officer Staff Grade B	Senior Assistant Commissioner
Operations Wing	Crime Wing	Personnel Wing	Information Systems Wing	Administration Wing	National Security Department
Support Wing	Security Wing	Police College	Service Quality Wing	Finance Wing
Public Relations Wing	Planning and Development Branch
Six Regions

== Structure ==
=== Operations and Support ('A' Department) ===
Police Force operational matters are coordinated by the Operations & Support Department. Land Operations and Support are divided into six regions, whereas marine matters are managed by the marine police—organised as one Marine Region. Each land region comprises two wings, the operations wing and support wing, and a traffic headquarters (which is part of the operations wing). The department is charged with the formulation and implementation of policies, the monitoring of activities and the efficient deployment of personnel and resources. Operations Wing coordinates counter-terrorism, internal security, anti-illegal-immigration measures, bomb disposal commitments and contingency planning for natural disasters—they are also responsible for the Police Dog Unit.

==== Operations Wing ====
The Operations Wing consists of three sections: The Operations Bureau, the Police Tactical Unit, and the Explosive Ordnance Disposal Bureau.

Operations Bureau comprises the Operations Division, the Counter-Terrorism and Internal Security Division, and the Key Points and Search Division which includes the Police Dog Unit. It deals mainly with the staffing of operational matters which include the formulation and dissemination of relevant Force orders, boundary security, deployment of resources, and liaison with the Hong Kong garrison. The Regional Command and Control Centre in Operations Division provides the means for exercising control over resources both at regional and district levels. It also acts as an information centre for the passage of information to the Headquarters CCC and other agencies. Equipped with the Enhanced Computer-Assisted Command and Control System, each Centre receives 999 calls from the public and provides a fast and efficient service to operational officers. The Emergency Unit within the Operations Division is primarily tasked with providing quick responses to emergency situations such as 999 calls, as well as a speedy and additional presence of uniformed police on the ground to combat crime. An EU comprises a headquarters element and four platoons that operate on a three-shift basis.

The Police Tactical Unit (PTU) provides an immediate manpower reserve for use in a large-scale emergency. Unit companies are attached to all land Regions and are available for internal security, crowd control, anti-crime operations, disaster response, and riot control throughout Hong Kong. The PTU also includes the Special Duties Unit (SDU) which specialises in counter-terrorism and hostage rescue.

Explosive Ordnance Disposal Bureau (EODB) is a special standalone unit within the Operations and Support Wing. Its main responsibilities are bomb-disposal work both on land and underwater. It also trains officers on explosives-related matters and inspects the storage of ammunition and explosives.

The Airport Security Unit (ASU) is tasked with the security of the Hong Kong International Airport. In 1998, the ASU moved to the Chek Lap Kok Airport.

Other peripheral section included the Anti-Illegal Immigration Control Centre that is responsible for collecting intelligence and monitoring operations regarding illegal immigrants from Mainland China and Vietnam. Administration Formation implements policies laid down by the Regional Commander and is responsible for the Region's general administration. Its responsibilities include community relations, staff relations, and magistrates. Crime Formation is responsible for investigates serious and inter-district crimes. In addition, it collects, collates and evaluates intelligence on criminals and criminal activity within the Region. The Traffic Branch Headquarters covers traffic control, enforcement of traffic legislation and regulations, investigation of traffic accidents, promotion of road safety, and implementing Force and Regional traffic policies.

==== Support Wing ====
Each of the land regions holds its own Support Wing. A Support Wing oversees the execution and staffing of operational support matters, including the formulation of operational policies for both the regular and Hong Kong Auxiliary Police Force and for updating kits and equipment. It is also responsible for the various licensing functions of the Force. The co-ordination of all public relations activities is arranged through the Police Public Relations Branch.

A support wing consists of Traffic Branch, Support Branch, and Police Public Relations Branch.

Traffic Branch Headquarters is responsible for formulating force priorities, policies and procedures on matters related to traffic, coordinating their implementation and monitoring their effects. It processes all traffic prosecutions such as the processing of traffic summons and fixed penalty tickets. It also collects and maintains traffic-related data such as monitoring the changes in traffic legislation. The Traffic Headquarters offers advice on traffic management matters, examines local traffic patterns and new major infrastructure projects. It also formulates, monitors, coordinates and evaluates road safety efforts, enforcement programmes, and traffic management schemes. It is also responsible for the administration of the Traffic Warden Corps, who assist the police in the control of traffic and enforcement of parking offences. It comprises the Traffic Management Bureau, Central Traffic Prosecutions Bureau, and Administration Bureau.

Support Branch is sub-divided into five divisions. Field Division is responsible for coordinating policy matters relating to firearms, equipment, uniforms and operational procedures. Projects undertaken by the Division during the year included the force-wide introduction of the OC Foam and the new, expandable baton. It had also been instrumental in developing technological solutions to a number of policing problems and is currently conducting a review of police uniforms including the cap and the shoes as well as other accouterments. General Division handles policy matters relating to station procedures; the security and management of the Police Headquarters (PHQ) complex; and diverse other duties. During the year, the Division played a major role in the streamlining of station procedures; making arrangements for the reallocation of offices and facilities; formulating a new policy for parking at the PHQ as required by the PHQ Redevelopment Project and such other duties as coordinating the Force involvement in the District Council elections. Transport Division is responsible for the management and deployment of the Force fleet of approximately 2,400 vehicles, driver establishment and the acquisition of new police vehicles. It also administers all policy matters relating to police transport requirements. Force Data and Access to Information Coordination Unit is responsible for coordinating the Force response to devising internal policy on and ensuring compliance with the provisions of the Personal Data (Privacy) Ordinance and the Code on Access to Information. Police Licensing Office acts as the licensing authority for a number of licences and permits.

Police Public Relations Branch is responsible for maintaining a high level of public confidence by robustly projecting a positive image of the Force through community and media relations. It is sub-divided into two branches: Community Relations Bureau and Information and Publicity Bureau

=== Crime and Security ("B" Department) ===
Crime & Security Department is responsible for the force policy regarding the investigation of crimes and matters of a security nature. Crime Wing consists of a number of operational bureaux and specialised units. The operational bureaux deal with specific areas of criminal activity whereas the specialised units provide support services to operational units in the force and deal with policy matters on various issues including child abuse, domestic violence, and witness protection. Security Wing provides VIP protection and security co-ordination, including counter-terrorism.

==== Crime Wing ====
Organised Crime and Triad Bureau (OCTB or O記) investigate major organised and serious crime involving all types of activities such as theft/smuggling of vehicles, human trafficking, firearms, vice, debt collection, syndicated gambling and extortion. It also investigates triad societies and their hierarchies with particular emphasis on their involvement in organised crime.

Criminal Intelligence Bureau (CIB) is the Force's central co-ordinating body for intelligence on crime and criminality which, after analysis and assessment, is disseminated to crime investigation units as required. In addition, the CIB works closely with the OCTB and other Crime Wing bureaux in tackling triad and organised crime syndicates. To strengthen the criminal intelligence capability within the Force, the Bureau also organises related training courses and seminars for investigators. Criminal Investigation Division or CID are sub-division located in each district.

Commercial Crime Bureau (CCB) investigates serious commercial and business fraud, computer-related crimes, the forgery of monetary instruments, identity documents and payment cards, and the counterfeiting of currency and coins. It liaises very closely with international law enforcement agencies on exchange of intelligence and requests for investigation from other jurisdictions alleging criminal conduct in relation to commercial transactions.

Narcotics Bureau (NB) investigates serious drug cases such as importation and manufacture of illicit drugs and gathers intelligence in relation to major drug activities. It also conducts investigations in partnership with overseas law enforcement agencies whenever there is a Hong Kong connection to international drug trafficking. The Bureau is also responsible for financial investigations using powers granted under the Drug Trafficking (Recovery of Proceeds) Ordinance, Organised and Serious Crimes Ordinance and the United Nations (Anti-Terrorism Measures) Ordinance.

Support Group is made up of units which provide a technical and professional service to support criminal investigation, including Criminal Records Bureau, Identification Bureau, Forensic Firearms Examination Bureau, Witness Protection Unit, and Child Protection Policy Unit. The group also fulfils a liaison responsibility for the Forensic pathology Service and the Forensic Science Division.

==== Security Wing ====
The Security Wing (Chinese: 保安部; Cantonese Yale: Bóuōn bouh) is responsible for a range of security-related matters including VIP protection, counter-terrorism and security co-ordination.

- Witness protection Unit
  - VIP Protection Unit (VIPPU)
  - Police Negotiation Cadre

=== Personnel and Training ("C" Department) ===
==== Personnel Wing ====
Personnel Wing is responsible for all core human resource management functions, including recruitment, promotion, conditions of service, staff relations, and welfare matters. In recent years, the Personnel Wing has also asserted the near-exclusive right to adjudicate disciplinary proceedings brought against Inspectors and Junior Officers. The establishment of a dedicated unit for this purpose made it easier for senior officers in the Personnel Wing to influence outcomes.

==== Training ====
Hong Kong Police College is responsible for all matters relating to training within the Hong Kong Police except internal security, Auxiliary, and Marine Police training. Training provided by the Police College includes recruit and continuation training, crime investigation training, police driver training, and weapon tactics training. The information technology training, command training, local and overseas management training, some specialist courses and periodic courses on firearms and first aid are also provided by the Police College.

- Hong Kong Police Band

=== Management Services ("D" Department) ===
==== Information Systems Wing ====
Information Systems Wing has two branches and one bureau dealing with communications, information technology, and business services.

Communications Branch designs, acquires, examines, and maintains all force communications networks and equipment including radio, video, navigational aids, speed detection radar, mobile phones, pagers, office telephones and mini firing range equipment. Information Technology Branch is responsible for the planning, development, implementation, operation and maintenance of information technology systems. It has over 10,000 terminals installed throughout Hong Kong supporting the Force in the spheres of command and control, criminal records, crime intelligence analysis, fingerprint identification, reports to Police, human and financial resources planning and management, transport management, licensing, and e-mail. Business Services Bureau coordinates the business needs of the five departments of the Force. It consists of the Business Services Division, the e-Police Division and the Major Systems Division which acts as the System "Owner" for systems used Force-wide.

==== Service Quality Wing ====
Service Quality Wing is responsible for spearheading initiatives to improve services provided to force customers both external and internal. The wing comprises three branches: Performance Review, Research and Inspections, and Complaints and Internal Investigations (C&II). The Wing is responsible for implementing the force strategy on 'service quality' which aims at promoting efficiency, effectiveness, and economy, whilst pursuing continuous improvement. The C&II Branch which includes the Complaints Against Police Office (CAPO) oversees the investigation and successful resolution of all complaints made both externally and internally against members of the force. The work of CAPO is closely monitored by the Independent Police Complaints Council to ensure that all complaints against police officers and traffic wardens are fully and impartially investigated. The findings of CAPO are then endorsed by the IPCC subject to their queries which is not rare after the enactment of IPCC Ordinance in 2009.

=== Finance, Administration & Planning ("E" Department) ===
Finance Wing is responsible for the financial management, stores, and internal audit of the Force. Administration Wing is responsible for civilian staff, force establishment matters, and the management of the Police Museum.

The Planning and Development Branch (P&D) coordinates strategic thinking and planning on options for the operational policing of Hong Kong into the foreseeable future. It is responsible for maintaining and modernising the police estate and for running projects for the construction of new police buildings/facilities.

=== National Security ("NS" Department) ===
The National Security Department deals with acts of sedition, terrorism, secession and collusion with foreign organizations. It was created in 2020 through the passing of the Hong Kong National Security Law. Officers in the department work closely with (but independent from) agents from the Hong Kong office of the Ministry of State Security.

== Ranks and insignia ==
The HKPF continues to use similar ranks and insignia to those used in British police forces. Until 1997, the St Edward's Crown was used in the insignia, when it was replaced with the Bauhinia flower crest of the Hong Kong government. Pips were modified with the Bauhinia flower in the middle replacing the insignia from the Order of the Bath. The crest of the force was modified in 1997.

=== Gazetted ===
- Commissioner of Police (CP) (Traditional Chinese: 警務處處長): crest over pip over wreathed and crossed batons. 1 blade pattern on collar, 2 blade patterns on tip of cap
- Deputy Commissioner of Police (DCP) (Traditional Chinese: 警務處副處長): crest over wreathed and crossed batons. 1 blade pattern on collar, 2 blade patterns on tip of cap
- Senior Assistant Commissioner of Police (SACP) (Traditional Chinese: 警務處高級助理處長): pip over wreathed and crossed batons. 1 blade pattern on collar, 2 blade patterns on tip of cap
- Assistant Commissioner of Police (ACP) (Traditional Chinese: 警務處助理處長): wreathed and crossed batons. 1 blade pattern on collar, 2 blade patterns on tip of cap
- Chief Superintendent of Police (CSP) (Traditional Chinese: 總警司): crest over two pips. 1 blade pattern on collar, 1 blade pattern on tip of cap
- Senior Superintendent of Police (SSP) (Traditional Chinese: 高級警司): crest over pip. HKP insignia on collar, 1 blade pattern on tip of cap
- Superintendent of Police (SP) (Traditional Chinese: 警司): crest. HKP insignia on collar, 1 blade pattern on tip of cap

=== Inspectorate ===
- Chief Inspector of Police (CIP) (Traditional Chinese: 總督察): three pips. HKP insignia on collar
- Senior Inspector of Police (SIP) (Traditional Chinese: 高級督察): two pips over bar. HKP insignia on collar
- Inspector of Police (IP) (Traditional Chinese: 督察): two pips. HKP insignia on collar
- Probationary Inspector of Police (PI) (Traditional Chinese: 見習督察): pip. HKP insignia on collar

=== Junior police officer (rank and file) ===
- Station Sergeant (SSGT) (Traditional Chinese: 警署警長): wreathed crest. HKP insignia on collar
- Sergeant (SGT) (Traditional Chinese: 警長): three downward-pointing chevrons with UI number
- Senior Constable (SPC) (Traditional Chinese: 高級警員): downward-pointing chevron with UI number
- Police Constable (PC) (Traditional Chinese: 警員): slide with UI number.
