= Tiffany Lau =

Hong Kong actress

- 劉穎鏇
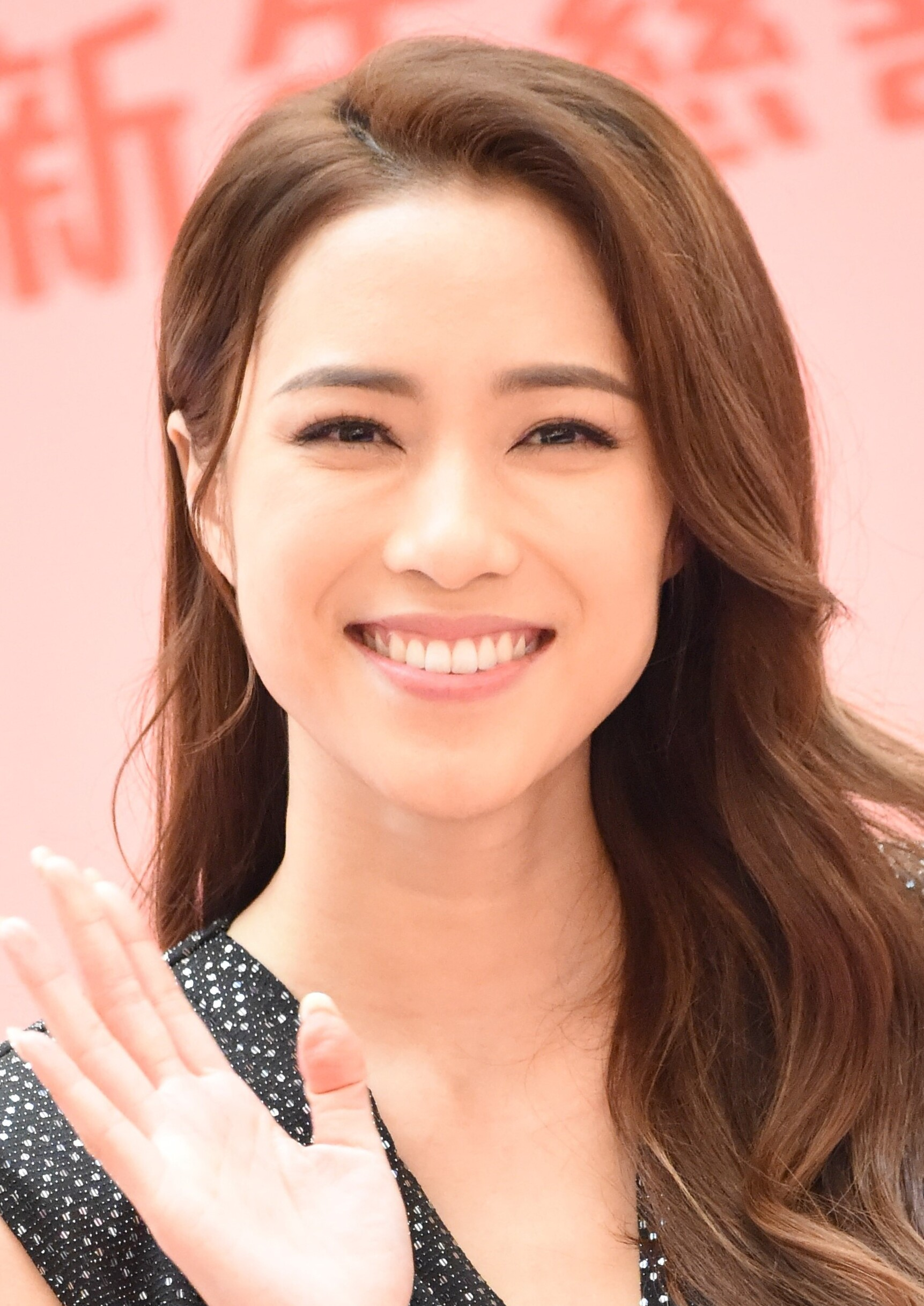
- Lau in 2023
- Born: Los Angeles, California, U.S.
- Education: University of California, Riverside; Arizona State University
- Occupations: host, actress

Tiffany Lau Wing-suen (Note: Chinese: 劉穎鏇; Jyutping: Lau^{4} Wing^{6}-syun^{4}) is a Hong Kong host and actress, the runner-up and Miss Photogenic of the 2016 Miss Hong Kong Pageant, and the winner of the Most Improved Female Artist award at the TVB Anniversary Awards 2023. Currently an artist of the TVB Manager Contract.

== Biography ==
Lau is an only child who has lived in Los Angeles since her childhood. She is talented in basketball and participated in many women's basketball games in high school, and represented the team in California, where she won second place. In 2015, she was admitted to the Department of Business Administration at the University of California, Riverside. In 2016, she went to Hong Kong to participate in the Miss Hong Kong Pageant and won the runner-up, Miss Photogenic and Most Popular Beauty Award. She decided to stay in Hong Kong after being elected. After graduating from the Artist Training Class, she studied online for a bachelor's degree in business administration at Arizona State University, and obtained the degree in December 2020.

In 2017, Lau became one of the hosts of the TVB information program Sidewalk Scientist, mainly hosting and filming TV series at present.In 2018, Lau played the leading female role for the first time in the TVB celebration drama Fist Fight, playing the role of "Chan Ling". She was nominated for "TVB Awards Presentation 2018", "Malaysia's Favorite TVB Actress" and "Best Actress in a Leading Role in a Leading Role" at "TVB Awards Presentation 2018". In the same year, she was accused of having sex in a car with artist Wu Fei for more than 20 minutes, but later admitted to the relevant reports but denied having done the above behavior.

In 2020, Lau played the role of "Wong Tsz-yu" (王芷瑜) in TVB's anniversary drama Legal Mavericks 2020, and her performance attracted much attention.In the same year, she was nominated for the "Most Improved Female Artist at the TVB Anniversary Awards 2020" for the first time. In 2021, Lau starred in the TVB drama series The Runner (大步走) and The Line Watchers playing the roles of "Kwok Bui Yee/Yuen Sheungsheung" (郭貝兒／袁雙雙) and "But Tingfei" (畢庭菲), she was nominated for the "Most Popular TV Female Character" for the first time at the TVB Awards Presentation 2021 for The Line Watchers, and was shortlisted for the top ten of "Most Improved Female Artist" at the end of the year.

In 2022, Lau starred in the TVB nostalgic youth drama Freedom Memories, playing the heroine Keung Chi Ngan, and won the "Best Actress in the TVB Awards Presentation 2022 for the first time with this drama. In the same year, Lau played the role of Or Chui Ping in the TVB anniversary drama I've Got The Power, and her performance attracted the attention of netizens, won the "AEG Entertainment Popularity King 2022" "Improved Female Artist (TV Series)".At the end of the same year, Lau was shortlisted for the final five of "Most Popular TV Female Character" at the "TVB Awards Presentation 2022" for this drama, and was also shortlisted for the final five of "Most Improved Female Artist" and "Best Actress".

Lau underwent three months of intensive training and dieting to prepare for her role in the police-gangster drama The Invisibles (2023), developing a physique suited to the character's demanding action sequences.

In 2024, Lau starred in the TVB drama The Airport Diary, playing the role of flight attendant Karmen Ko in the drama, and her performance once again became the focus of the audience.

== Filmography ==
=== TV series ===
Year	Title	Role	Note
2017	Heart and Greed	Sexy Beauty	Guest role
2018	Fist Fight	Chan Ling (Zero)	
2020	Legal Mavericks 2020	Wong Tsz-yu	
2021	The Runner	Belle Kwok Bui-yee / But Ting-fei	
2021	The Line Watchers	But Ting-fei	
2022	The Righteous Fists	Fong Siu-yau	
2022	Freedom Memories	Peggie Keung Chi-ngan	
2022	My Pride		
2022	I've Got the Power		
2023	The Invisibles		
2025	Anonymous Signal		
2025	Prism Breaker		

== Awards and nominations ==
Year	Award	Category	Nominated work	Results	Ref.
2022	AEG Entertainment Popularity	Most Improved Female Artist	I've Got the Power	Won	
2023	TVB Anniversary Awards	Most Improved Female Artist	The Invisibles, Unchained Medley & Lokyi in the Wild	Won	
