= Hong Kong Police College =

Police academy in Hong Kong

Coordinates: 22°14′49″N 114°10′18″E

Hong Kong Police College (Chinese: 香港警察學院)
- Type: Public
- Established: 2006
- President: Kelly Cheng Lai-ki (2026)
- Location: 18 Ocean Park Road, Wong Chuk Hang, Southern District, Hong Kong Island, Hong Kong.
- Campus: Urban
- Website: https://www.police.gov.hk/ppp_en/07_police_college/

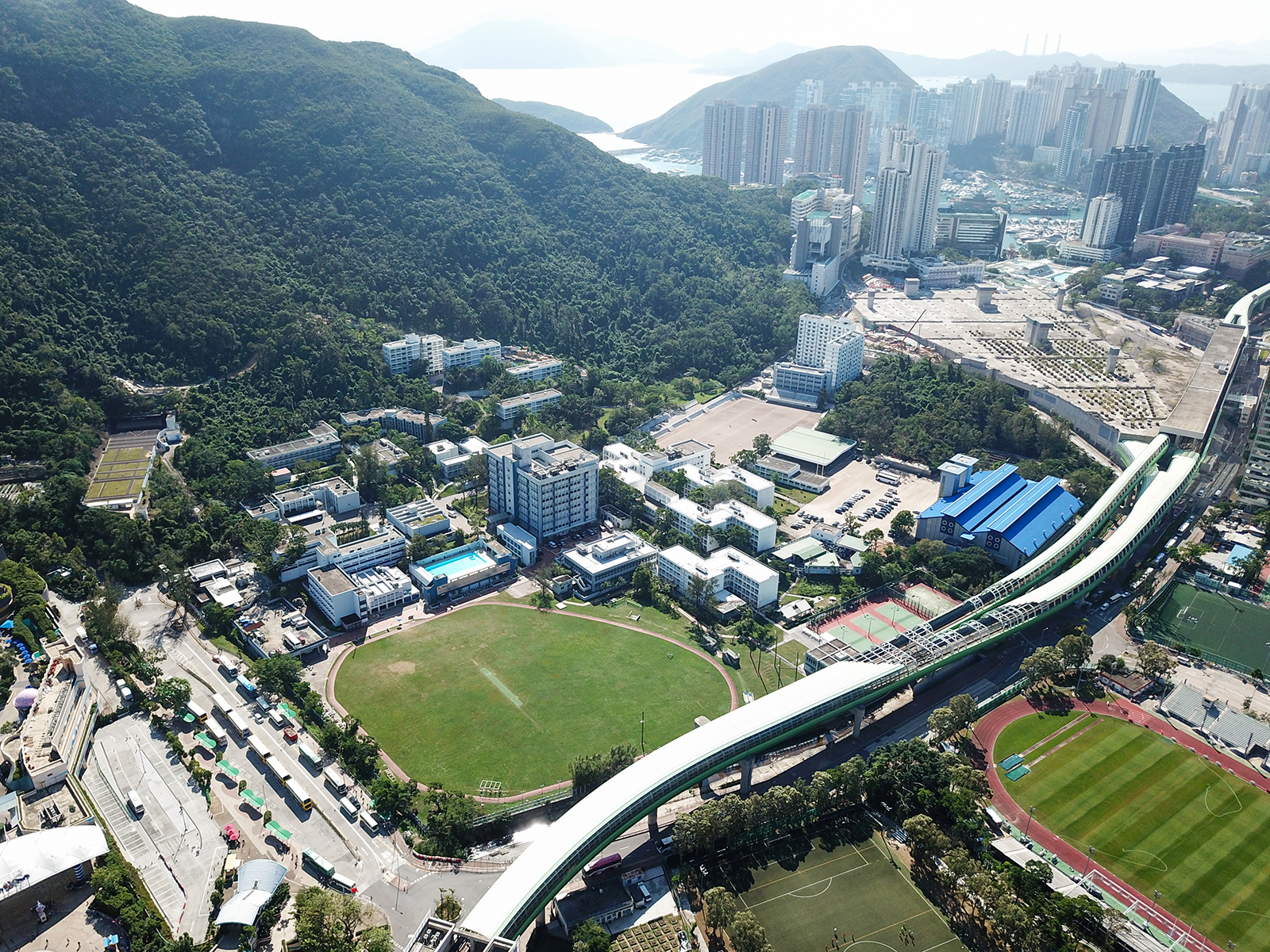
Hong Kong Police College (Wong Chuk Hang Campus)

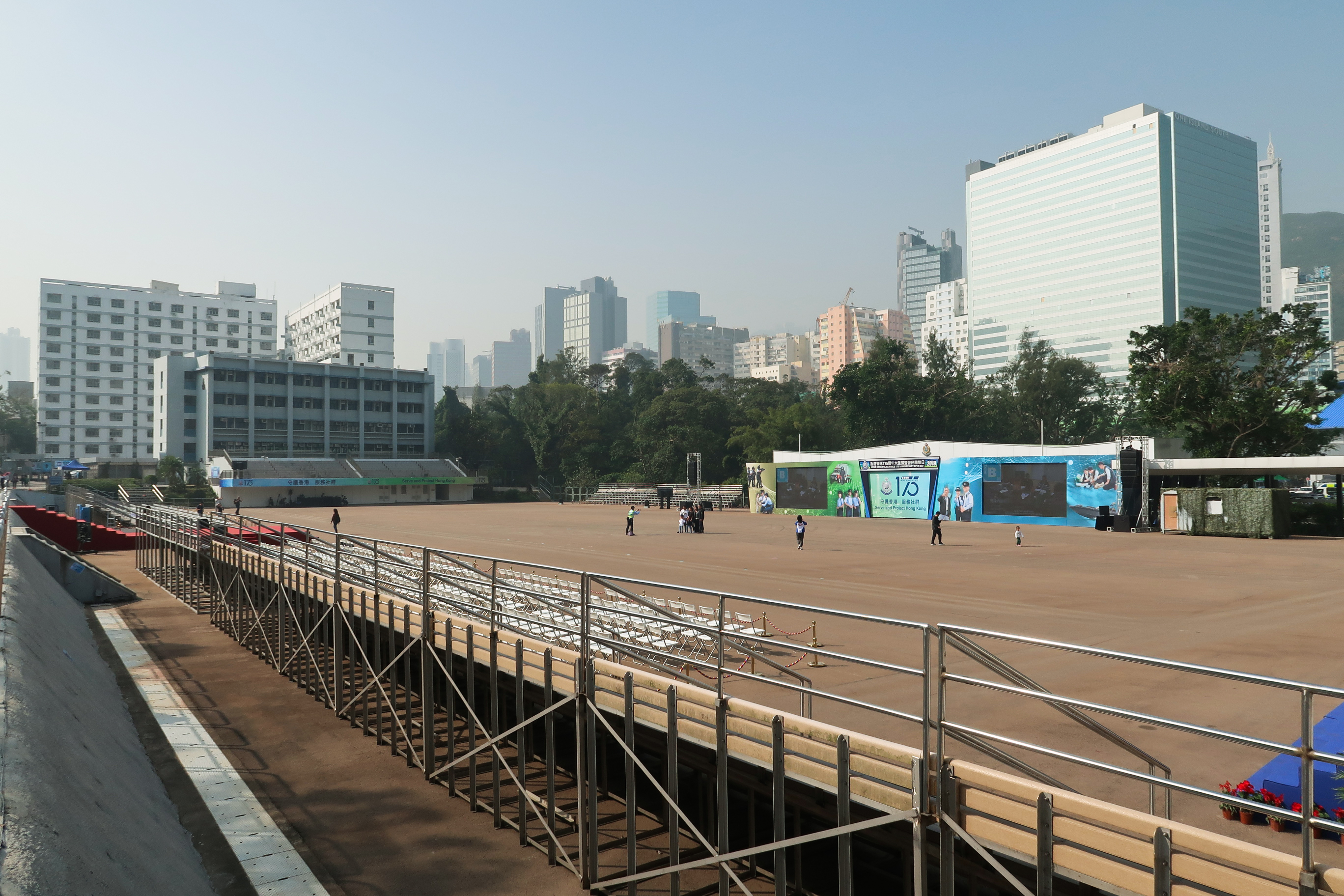
Large playground

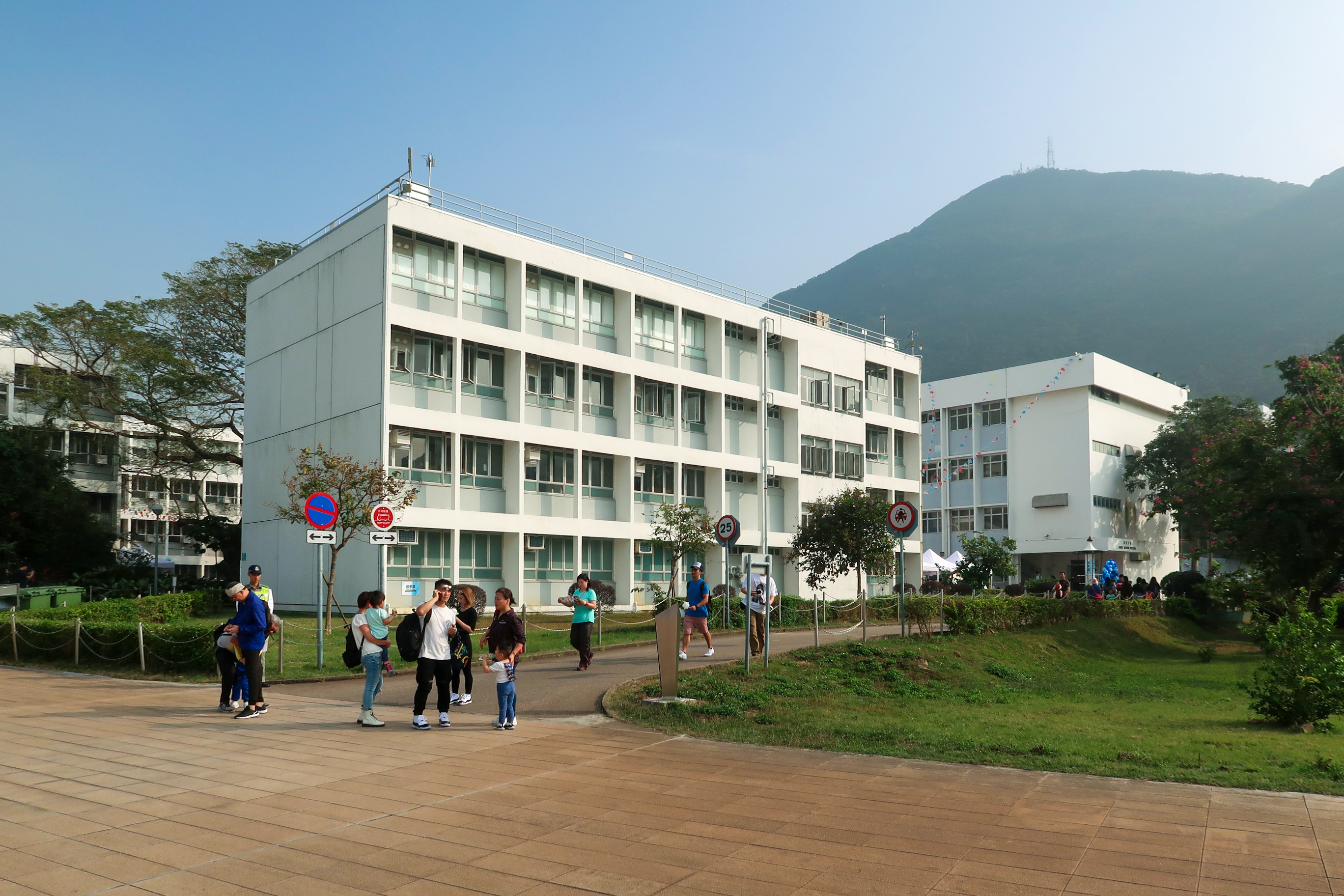
Dormitories

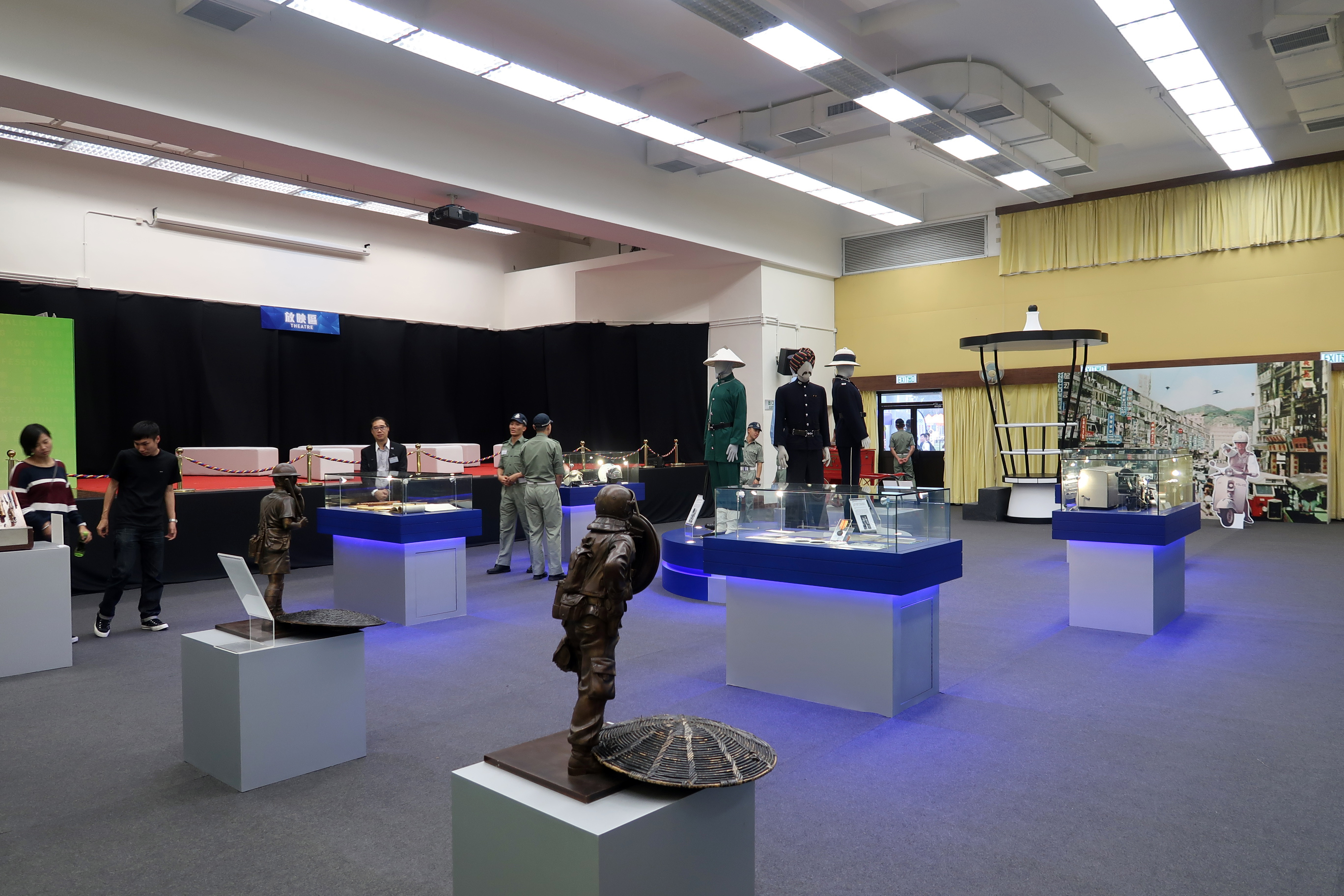
The Lower Gymnasium hosted a historical development exhibition during the 2019 "Hong Kong Police Force 175th Anniversary Grand Performance and Police-Community Fun Day".

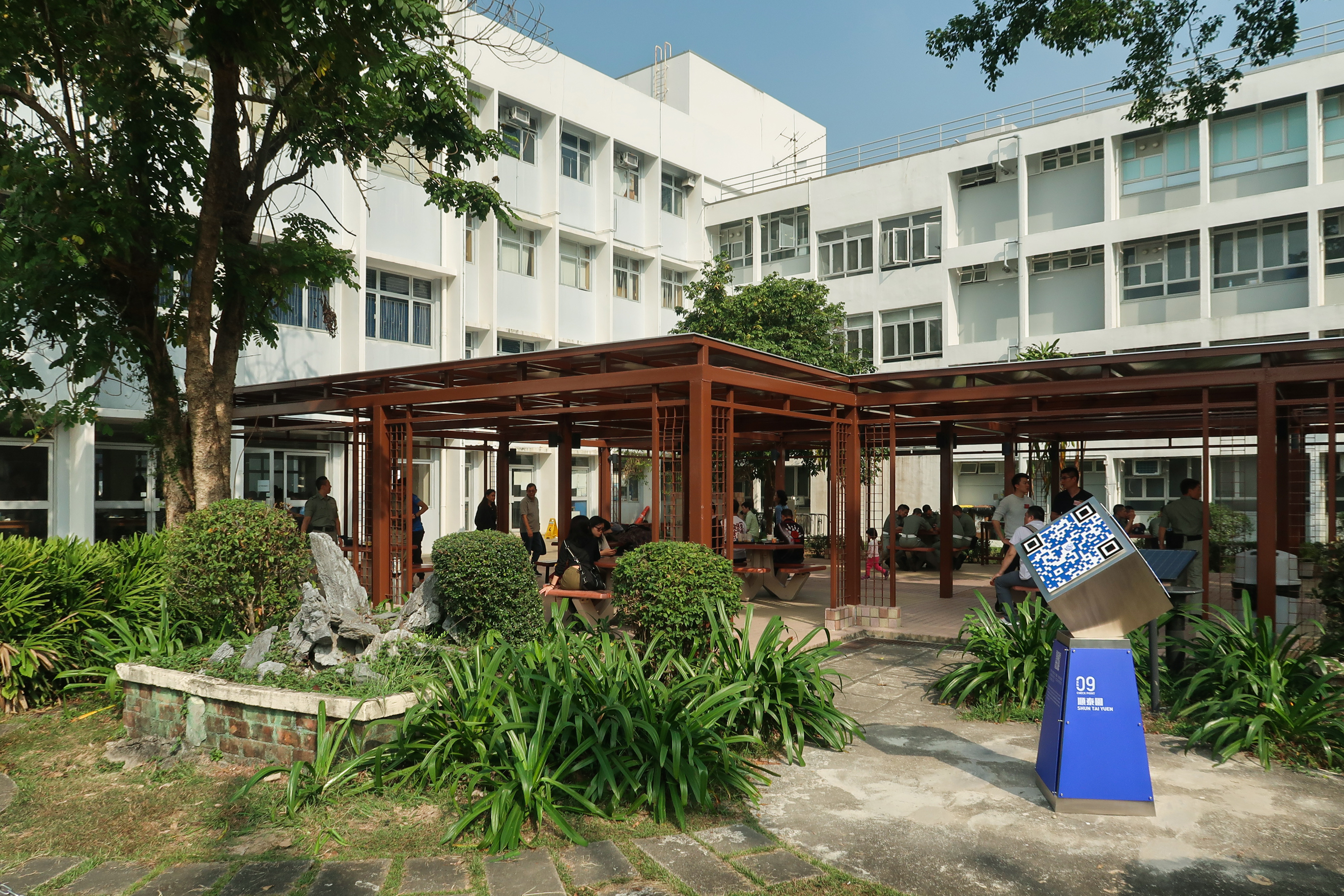
Shuntai Garden

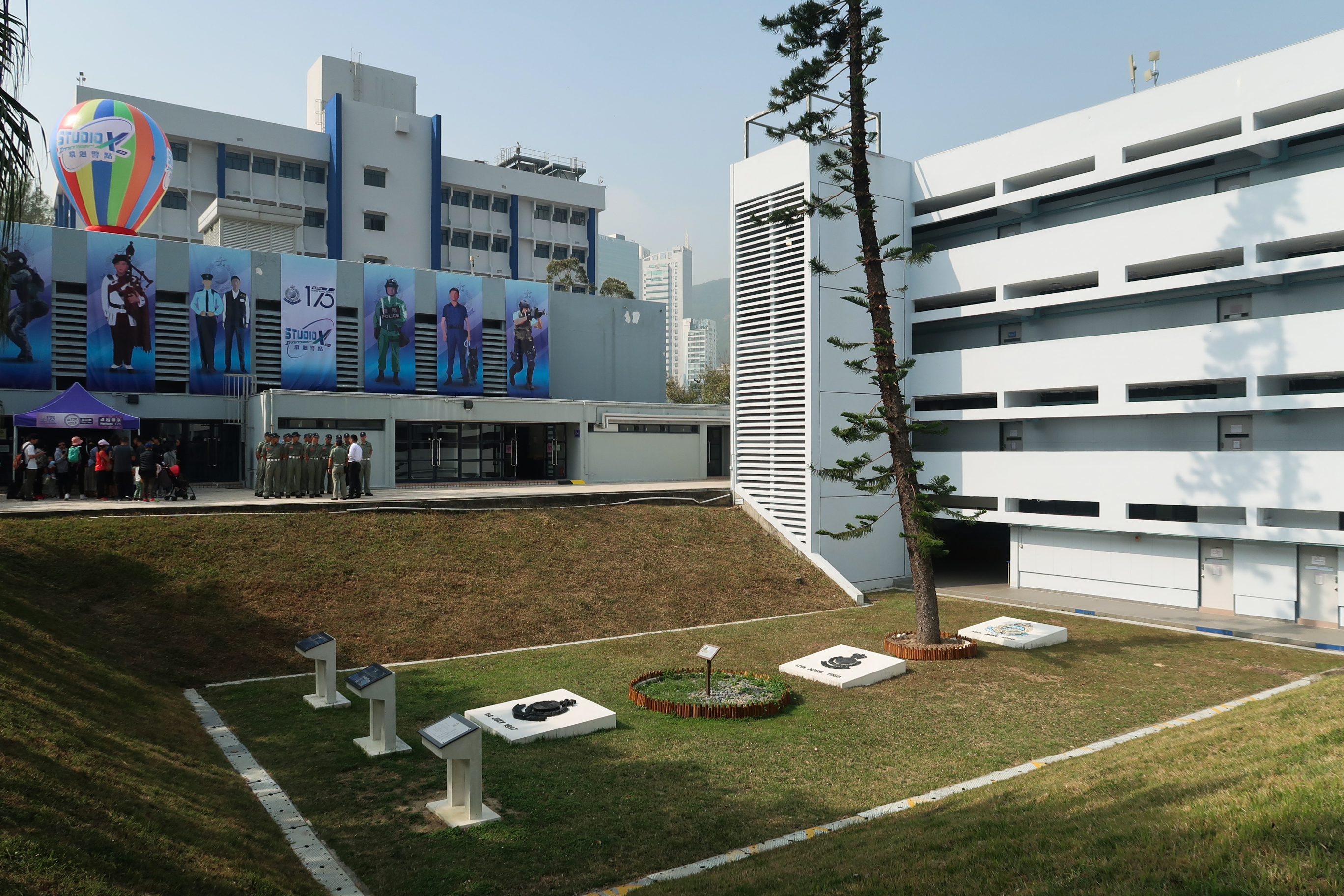
The Police College Memorial Park features stone tablets bearing the emblems of the Hong Kong Police Force from three different periods.

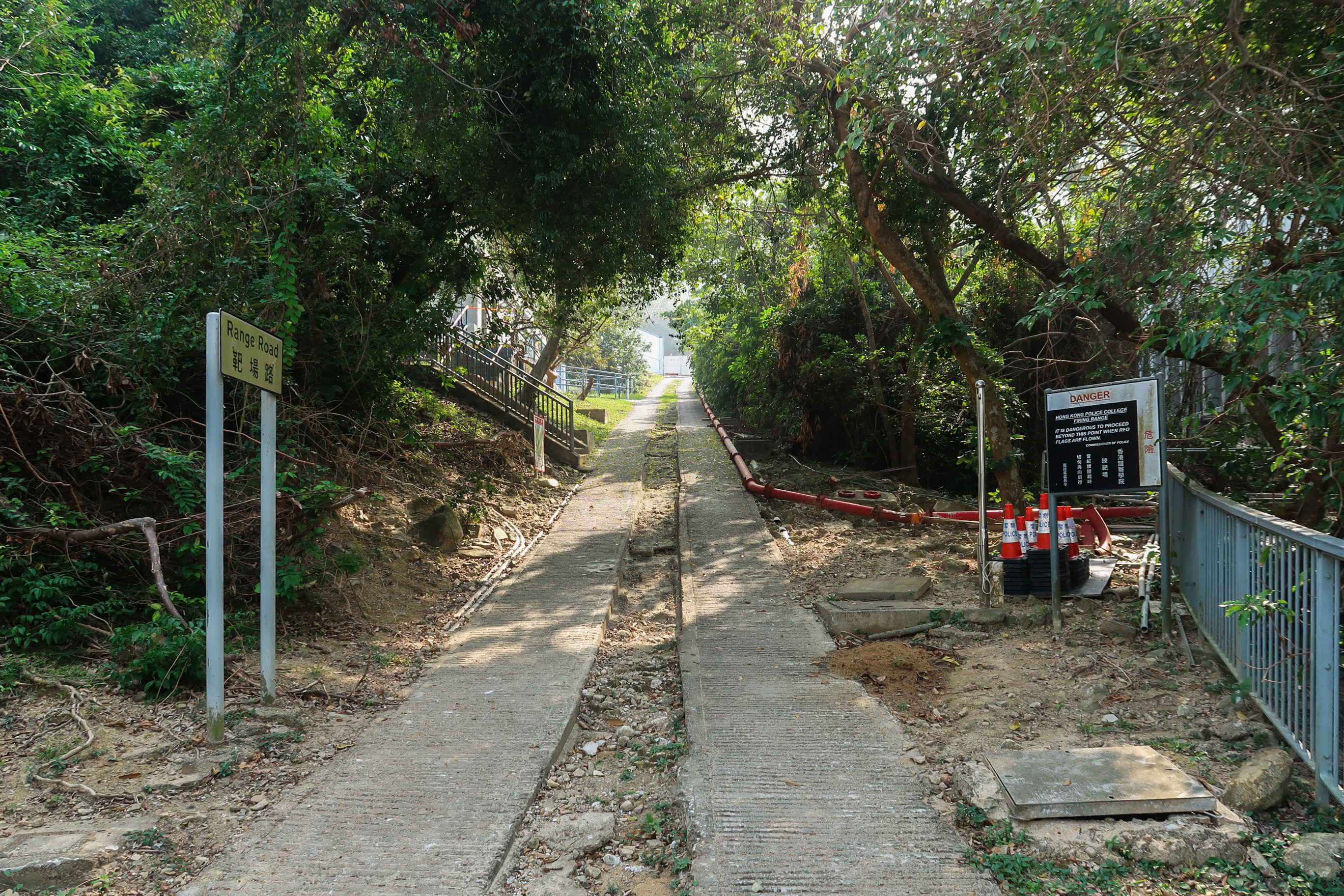
Target Range Road

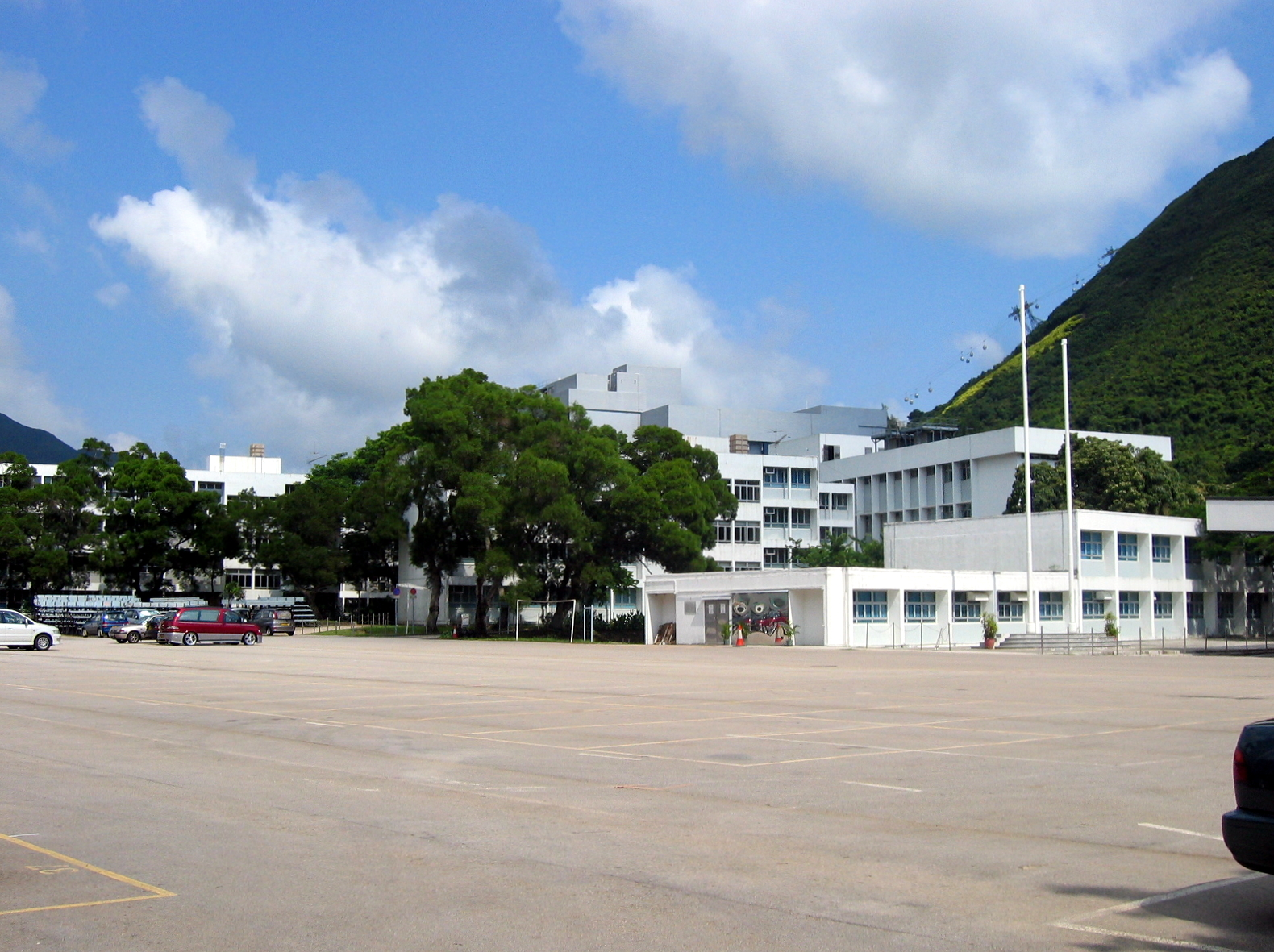
College parking lot (2005)

Hong Kong Police College (HKPC), formerly the "Hong Kong Police Training School" (PTS), is the main training and development institution of the Hong Kong Police Force. It is the first government department in Hong Kong that can award bachelor's degrees. The Hong Kong Police College not only provides training for newly recruited or serving police officers of all ranks, but also provides training courses for other Hong Kong disciplined forces, Hong Kong government departments, overseas law enforcement agencies and even Interpol. Some instructors have also been invited to serve as members of the Interpol Police Training Expert Group. Hong Kong Police College was officially established in 2006, with a history tracible to 1869, and has developed into an educational institution of three schools and two divisions. The Hong Kong Police Band is under the School of Foundation Training.

== Purpose and Mission ==
Hong Kong Police College aspires to become one of the world's leading and excellent police training centers, training highly capable and honest professional police officers who are dedicated to serving Hong Kong.

== Organization ==
The Director of Hong Kong Police College is an Assistant Commissioner of Police who reports to the Director of Personnel and Training (Senior Assistant Commissioner of Police) on the implementation of the Police Force's training and development policies; two Chief Superintendents serve as Deputy Directors. As of the year 2026, the College director is Cheng Lai-ki.

The college is composed of

- School of Foundation Training
- School of Professional Development
- School of Specialised Learning
- Administration and Support Division
- Human Resources and Finance Division

The Hong Kong Police Band is one of the 5 divisions under the School of Foundation Training.

=== Campus ===
- Headquarters: Located on the 20th floor of the Police Headquarters Building, 1 Arsenal Street, Wan Chai. It has facilities such as an indoor shooting range, a mock court, and a police library.
- Hong Kong Police College: Located at 18 Ocean Park Road, Wong Chuk Hang. It has facilities such as classrooms, a police library, a gymnasium, a sports hall, a running track, a playground, an outdoor shooting range, a mock reporting room, and a tactical training building.
- Integrated Training Centre: Located at 59 Gangwafu Road, Man Kam To. It has a shooting range, a police driving and traffic training centre, an anti-terrorism training ground, and a helipad, and is gradually replacing several police college facilities in the North District.
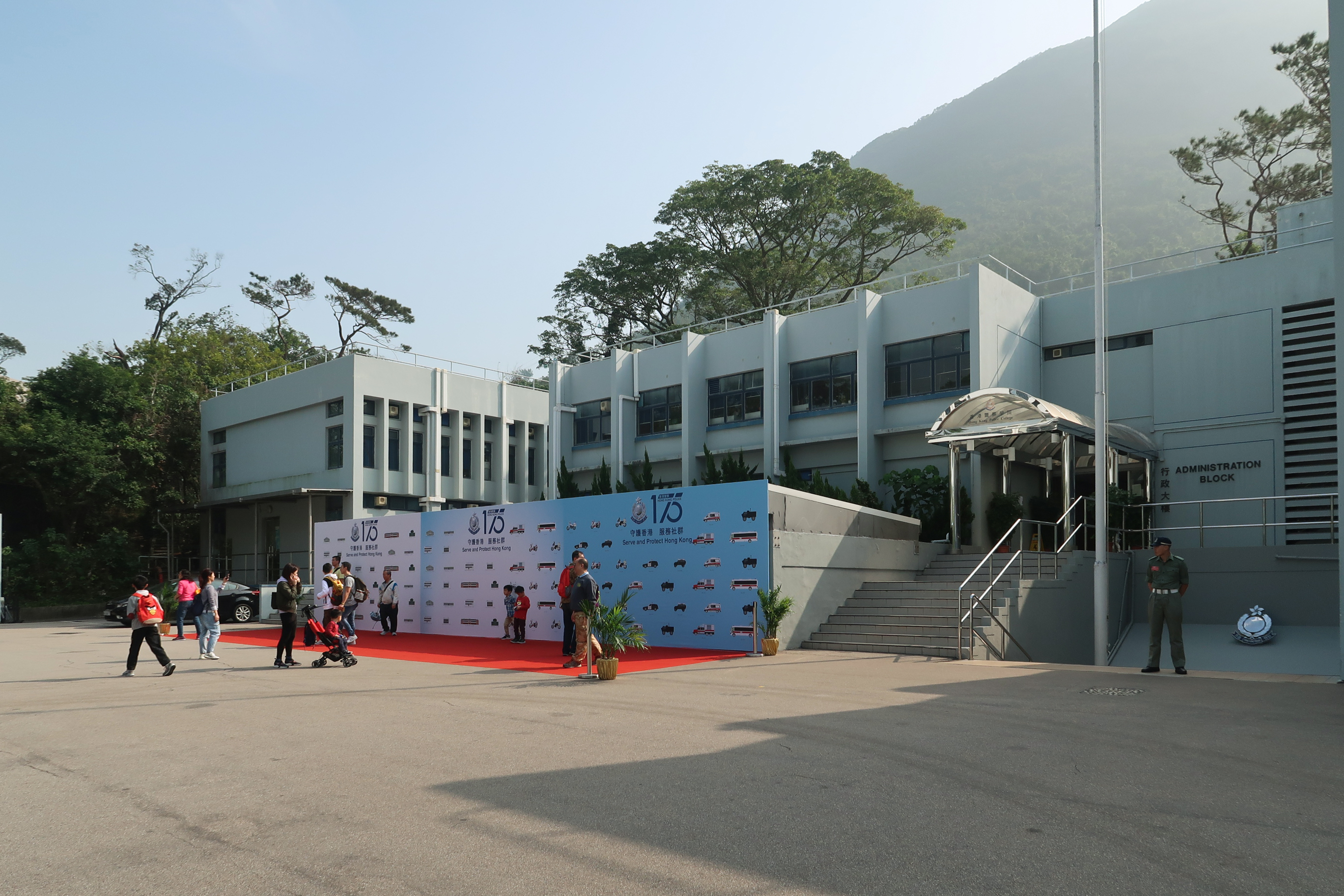
Administration Building

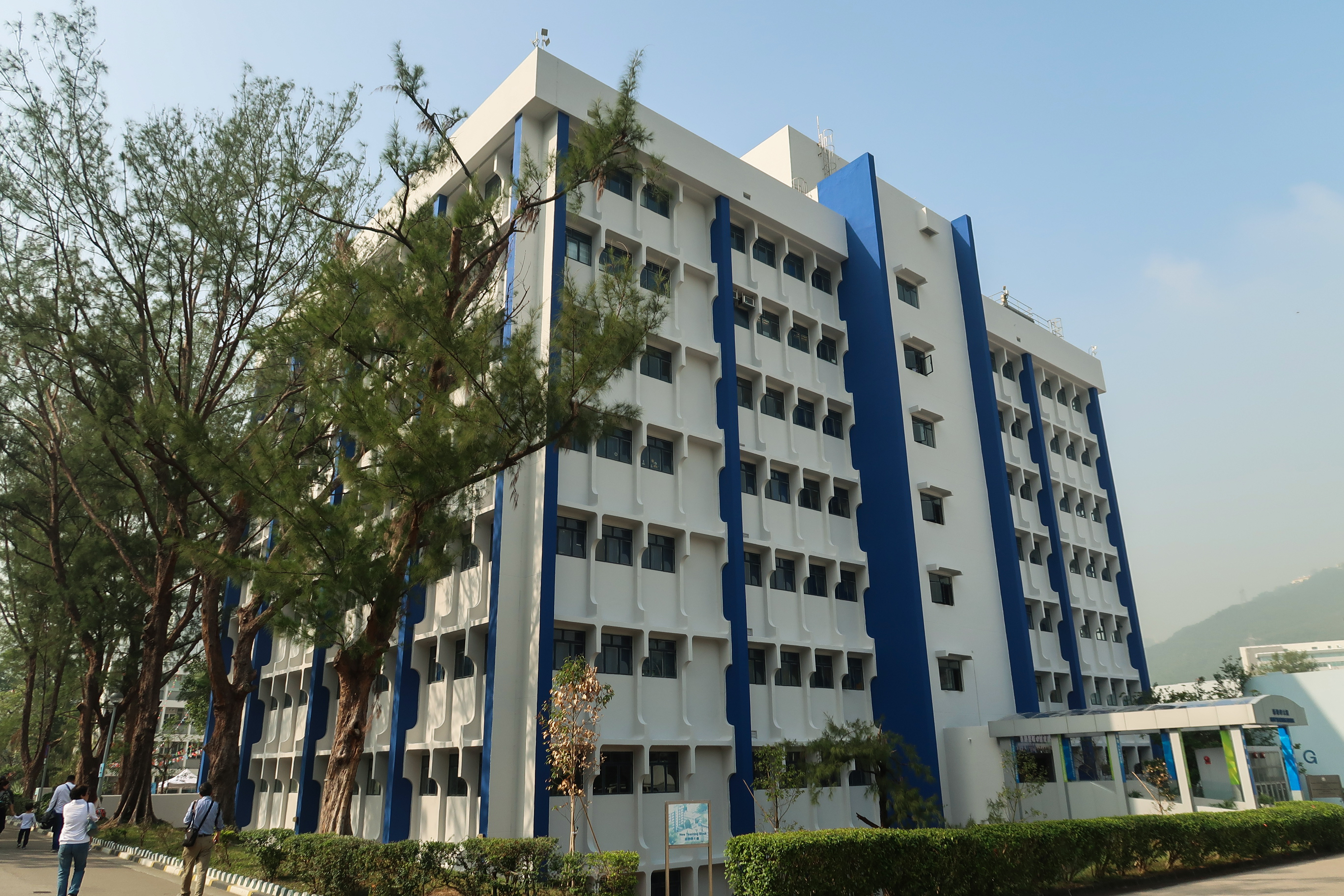
New Teaching Building

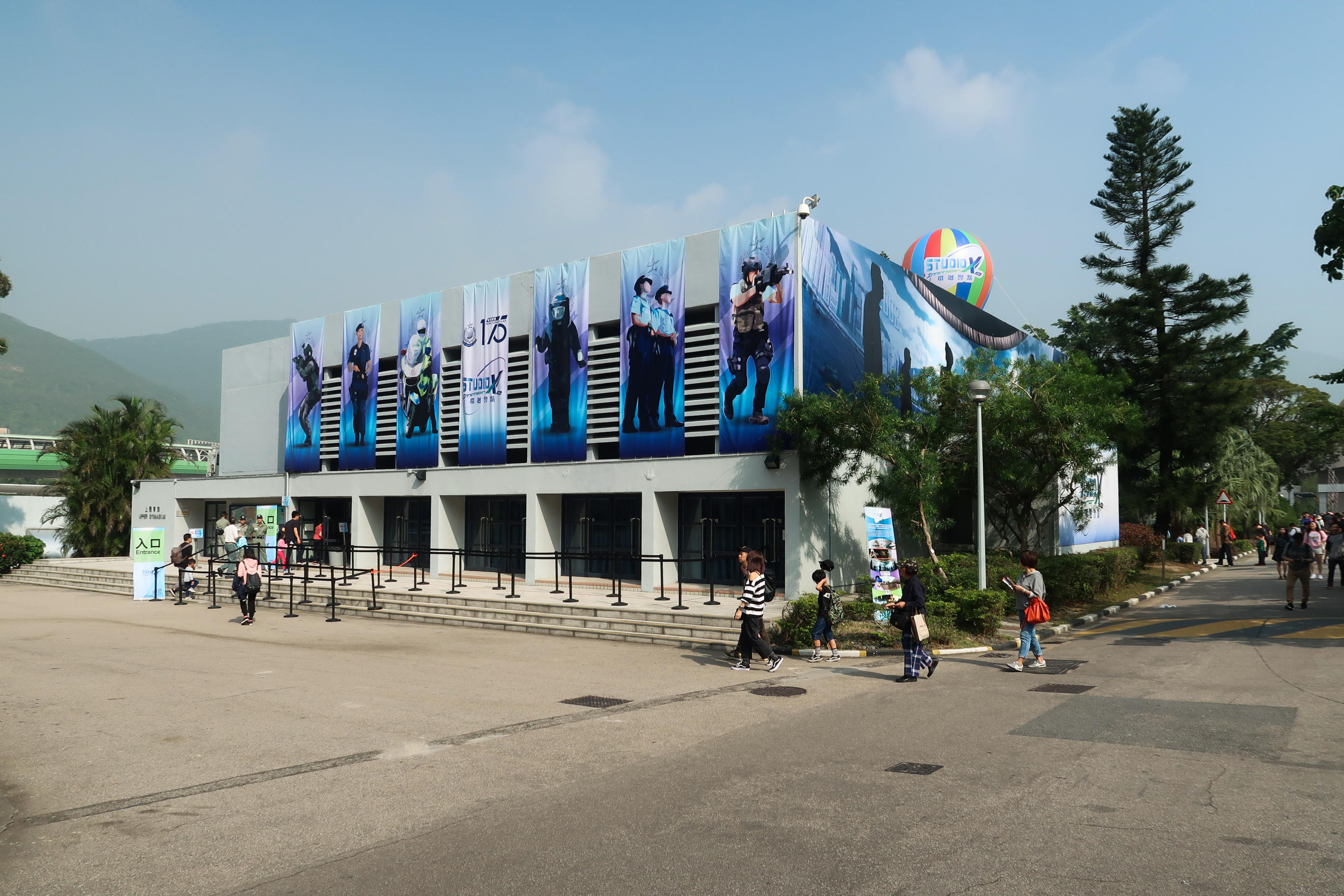
Upper Gymnasium

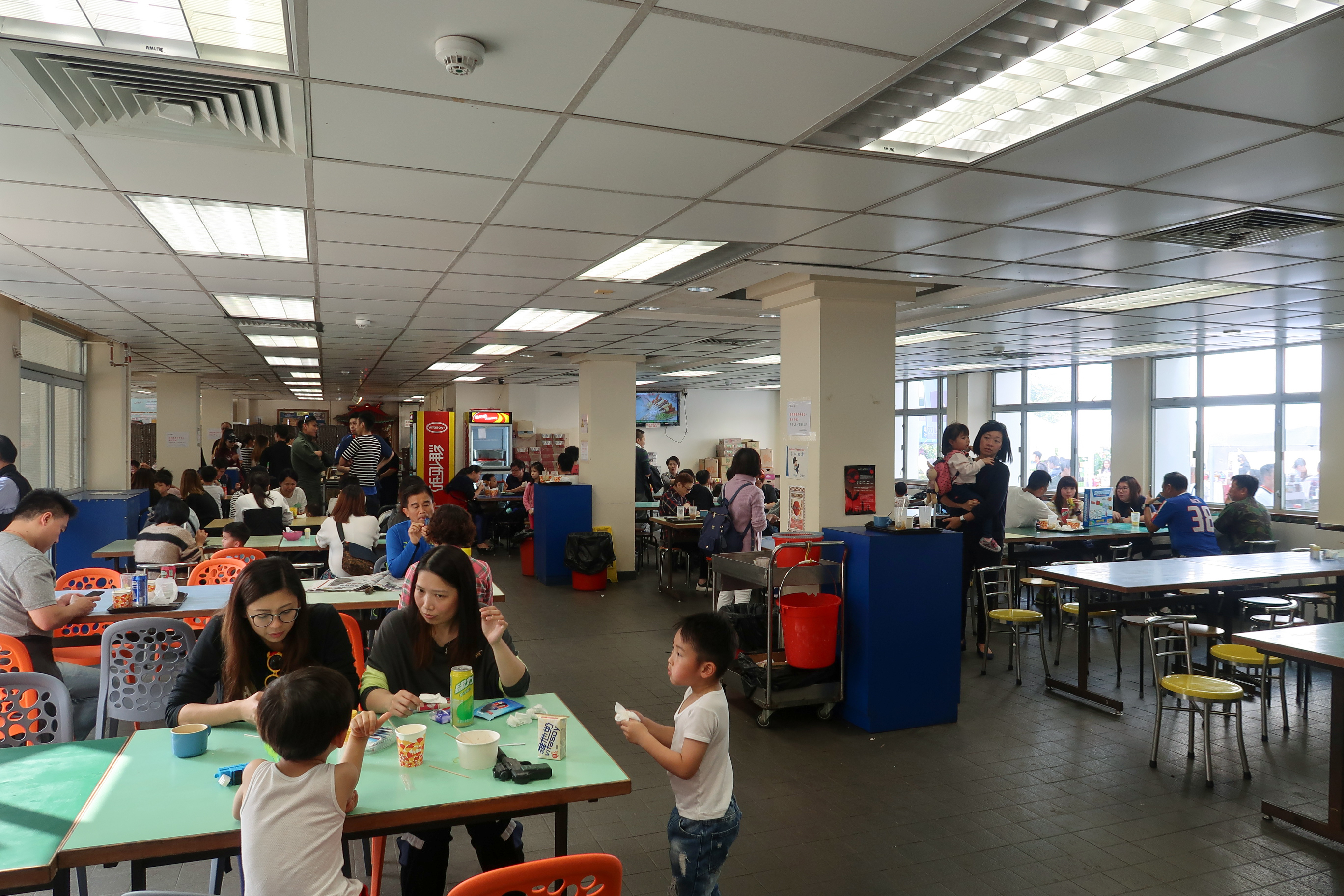
Mo Rong Building (Teahouse)

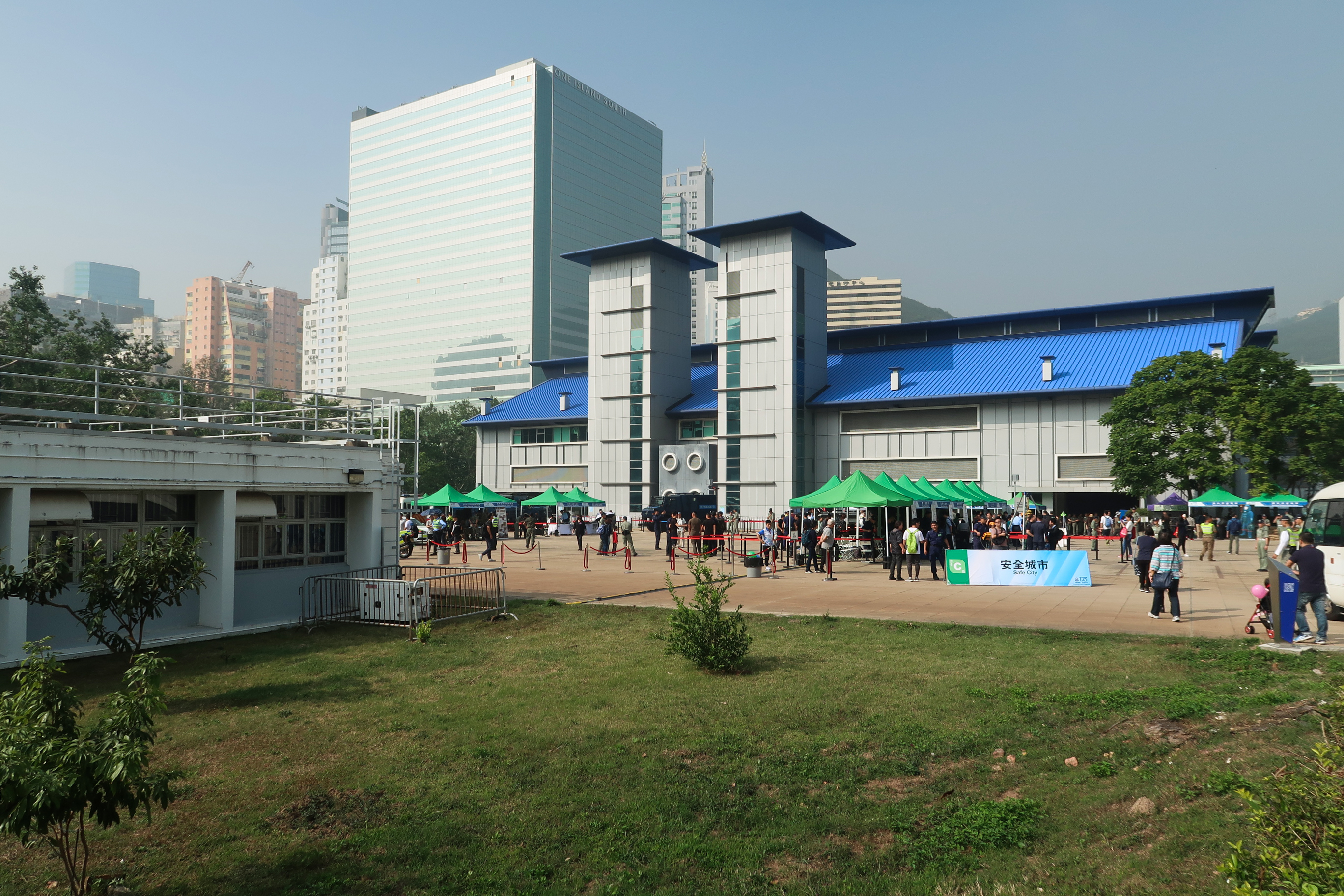
Tactical Training Building

== History ==
The history of the Hong Kong Police College can be traced back to 1869, when an evening school was opened for members of the Police Force and Goal Staff. By 1872, attendance became compulsary for police members in Hong Kong Central District or near the Police School at the Central Barracks. From 1869 to 1920, the school moved to different places on the Hong Kong Island, including court rooms, a police library, a police station and a middle school.

In 1920, a new Police Training School was established in Central Police Station, replacing the original Police School. In 1923, the Police Training School moved to Harbour View. In 1928, the School moved to Kowloon, at the junction of Prince Edward Road and Nathan Road.

In 1946, after the Japanese invasion of Hong Kong in the World War II, the school moved to St. Stephen's Primary School in Stanley. In February 1948, the school moved to its present site at Wong Chuk Hang in south Hong Kong Island, and was formally renamed "Hong Kong Police Training School".

In June 1981, the school spent HK$14 million to build the Police Silver Band Building. In 2002, the Training Department conducted a comprehensive review and proposed a preliminary recommendation to upgrade the Police Training School to a Police College. In March of the following year, the Training Department published a feasibility study entitled "Exploring the Establishment of a Police College as an Outstanding Police Training Centre." In October 2005, the Hong Kong Police Force signed a contract with the Open University of Hong Kong to jointly offer courses on social sciences and police psychology in the Basic Training Course for Police Cadet.

After years of preparation, the Hong Kong Police College was established on January 1, 2006, replacing the Police Training School. During their training, trainees were invited to use the facilities on campus of the Open University of Hong Kong. Upon graduation, they could obtain a certificate in law enforcement and security management issued by the Open University of Hong Kong, and could also enroll in other advanced courses and higher degree programs offered by the Open University of Hong Kong, and receive a 30-credit exemption, thereby encouraging officers to continue their studies. In the same year, the Honorary Advisors and Mentors Scheme of the College was launched, with the goal of attracting experts from inside and outside the Police Force to serve as advisors and mentors.

On May 18, 2009, the Hong Kong Police College received the Quality Training and Development Award from the American Society for Training and Development (ASTD), which has over 44,000 members in 104 countries and regions worldwide. On June 26, 2014, the Hong Kong Council for Accreditation of Academic and Vocational Qualifications confirmed that the Police Professional Diploma for Trainee Police Officers and the Police Leadership and Management Professional Diploma for Probationary Inspectors awarded by the Hong Kong Police College had passed course accreditation, and the two courses were recognized as Level 4 (equivalent to Higher Diploma and Associate Degree) and Level 5 (equivalent to Bachelor's Degree) in the Hong Kong Qualifications Framework, respectively.

In August 2026, the Bachelor of Policing degree program by the Hong Kong Police College was approved by the education bureau, and the College became the first government unit to offer a degree course. The program covers the subjects of policing theory, criminal investigation, practical training and academic language, as well as a graduation project.

Since February 2019, the Police Force has been preparing to consolidate its police training facilities in the North District at Sheung Shui Kong Nga Po. On January 8, 2026, the first phase of the Academy's Comprehensive Training Center was officially put into use.

== Training ==
=== Police Cadet Training Course ===
Trainees undergo 27 weeks of residential training, including courses at the Hong Kong post-secondary education level such as police psychology and police sociology, as well as courses in criminal psychology, stress management, conflict management, community policing, police conduct, police and media, and psychological theory and application, to deepen their practical knowledge and skills in professional training. Trainees must pass a final examination to graduate.

=== Probationary Inspector Training Course ===
Probationary inspectors undergo 36 weeks of residential training. Successful candidates will be awarded a Professional Diploma in Leadership and Management in Policing, Level 5 of the Hong Kong Qualifications Framework (equivalent to a Bachelor's degree).

=== Other training courses ===
There are the Strategic Traffic and Road Management Training Course, Detective Training Course, Infantry Drill Instructor Course, Physical Training Instructor Continuing Education Course, Physical Training Instructor Course, Mobile Tactics Teaching Corps, Basic Command Course, Intermediate Command Course, Advanced Command Course, International Executive Development in Policing Course. The International Executive Development in Policing course is a 10-month program jointly offered by the Hong Kong Police College and the Canadian Police College. It aims to develop police leadership skills and includes two online learning phases and two in-person classroom phases.

== Passing Out Parade ==
At each graduation parade (officially called "Passing Out Parade" (POP)) held by the Hong Kong Police College, the officiating guests present awards to outstanding student officers and probationary inspectors. On September 16, 2023, the Director of the Liaison Office of the Central People's Government in Hong Kong served as the inspector for the Hong Kong Police Force's graduation drill for the first time. In 2025 there were 29 probationary inspectors and 158 recruit police constables graduated.

== Cooperation and Exchange ==
The Hong Kong Police College has been strengthening cooperation with law enforcement agencies and police training institutions in mainland China and overseas, including the Metropolitan Police Service, United Kingdom; Singapore Police Force; French National Police; National Police of the Netherlands; People's Public Security University of China; Guangdong Police College; Korean Police Agency; Royal Police of Thailand; Royal Canadian Mounted Police. In addition, the Hong Kong International Academy of Policing is to be established on November 11, 2026.

== TV Series ==
- Police Cadet '84 (1984)
- The Academy (Hong Kong TV series) (2005)
- On the First Beat (2007)

== Controversy ==
=== June 2020 Police Cadet Internship Exam Cheating Incident ===
In May 2020, seven police cadets were required to use brand-new notebooks during a mock internship exam. However, the cadets involved brought and used "used" old notebooks, which was deemed a violation of guidelines. According to past practice, police cadets who cheat on exams would be expelled. However, some police management, seeing the difficulty in recruiting police cadets, decided to simply have the entire class retake the exam. This approach caused dissatisfaction among the 17 innocent and honest police cadets who had to retake the exam, who questioned how the seven cheating cadets could graduate and become police officers to maintain law and order. The Police later confirmed that the seven police cadets involved are currently under disciplinary investigation, indicating that they would not graduate with their classmates.

== See also ==
- Hong Kong Police Force
- Hong Kong Police Band
- Special Tactical Contingent
