= Hong Kong Police Band =

Military band of the Hong Kong Police Force

Hong Kong Police Marching Band

Agency overview
- Formed: 1954
- Preceding agency: HKPB, Hong Kong Police Marching Band
- Employees: 84 officers (60 from Marching Band and 24 from Pipe Band)

Jurisdictional structure
- Operations jurisdiction: Hong Kong
- General nature: Civilian police

Operational structure
- Headquarters: Peter Moor Building, Aberdeen Campus, Hong Kong Police College

The Hong Kong Police Marching Band also known as the HKPF Marching Band is a ceremonial unit and a police band of the Hong Kong Police Force and is used for official events. It was established in 1954 and initially performed with the Hong Kong Police Marching Band (formed in 1951). Both bands merged to form a single band and was later renamed the Hong Kong Police Force Marching Band.

The Pipe Band colours is the MacIntosh outfit and was adopted in memory of a former Commissioner of Police, Duncan Macintosh, after which the MacIntosh Forts were also named.

== Organisation ==
The band has 84 members, made up of 60 from the Silver Band (regular ceremonial band) and 24 from the Pipe Band. The Auxiliary Police also has an Auxiliary Police Band that participates in parades with the regular pipe band. The Hong Kong Police Band is based at the Peter Moor Building, School of Foundation Training, Hong Kong Police College. It has barracks, practice rooms, offices, and musical instruments at Peter Moor Building.

== History ==
The Hong Kong Police Band began in 1951, when Superintendent W. B. Foster MBE led 21 people, organized in a silver band, to perform at routine police events, followed by performances due to increasing demand. Later in 1954 the silver band was merged with the drum band to form the Royal Hong Kong Police Band. On May 30 and July 1, 2011, in order to mark the 14th anniversary of the reunification of Hong Kong to China, the police band made its first performance with the Central Military Band of the People's Liberation Army of China and held a large-scale symphony orchestra concert at the Queen Elizabeth Stadium.

In December 2016, the band received training from instructors from the Army School of Ceremonial at the British Army's Infantry Training Centre.

== Gallery ==
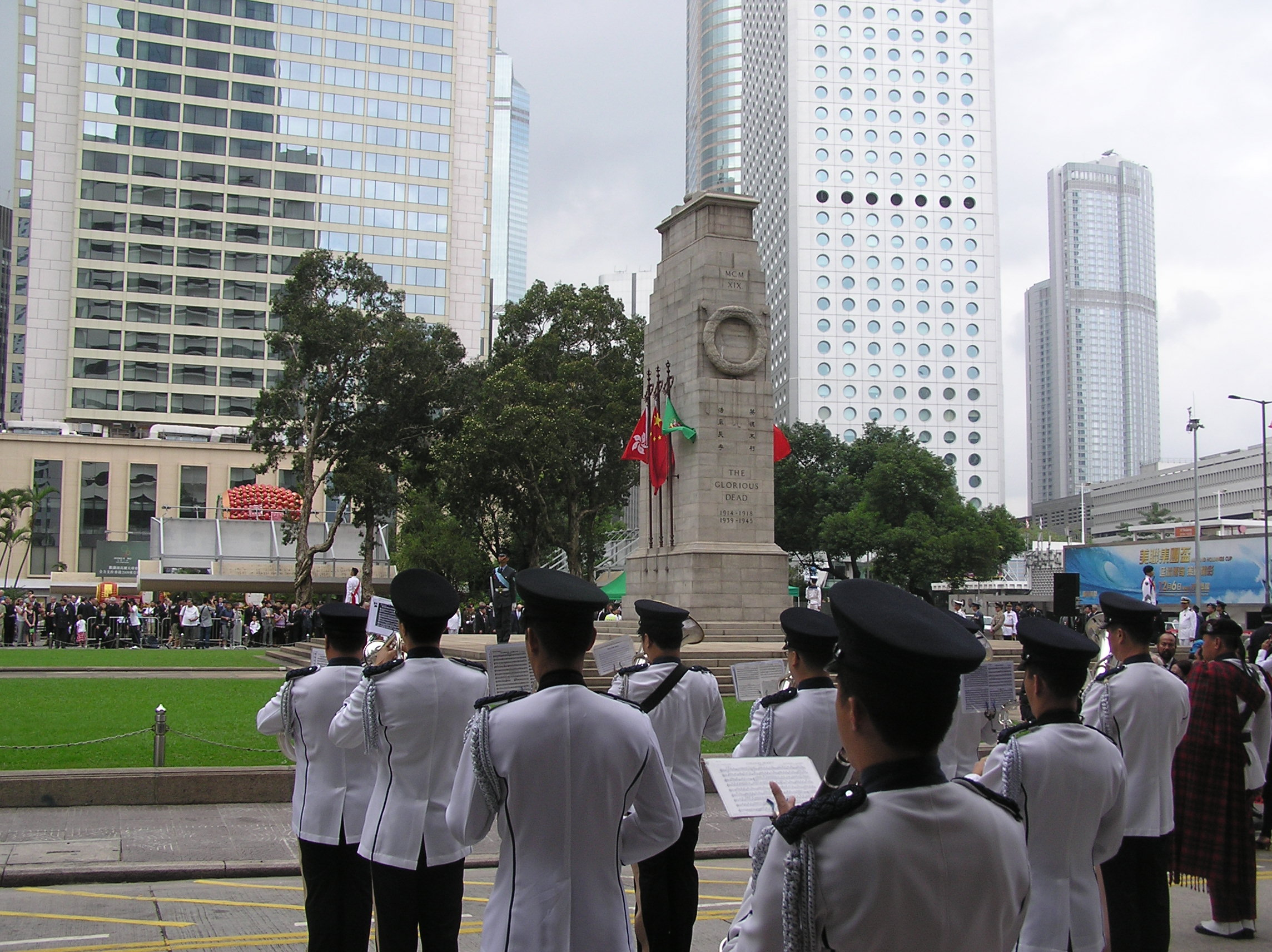

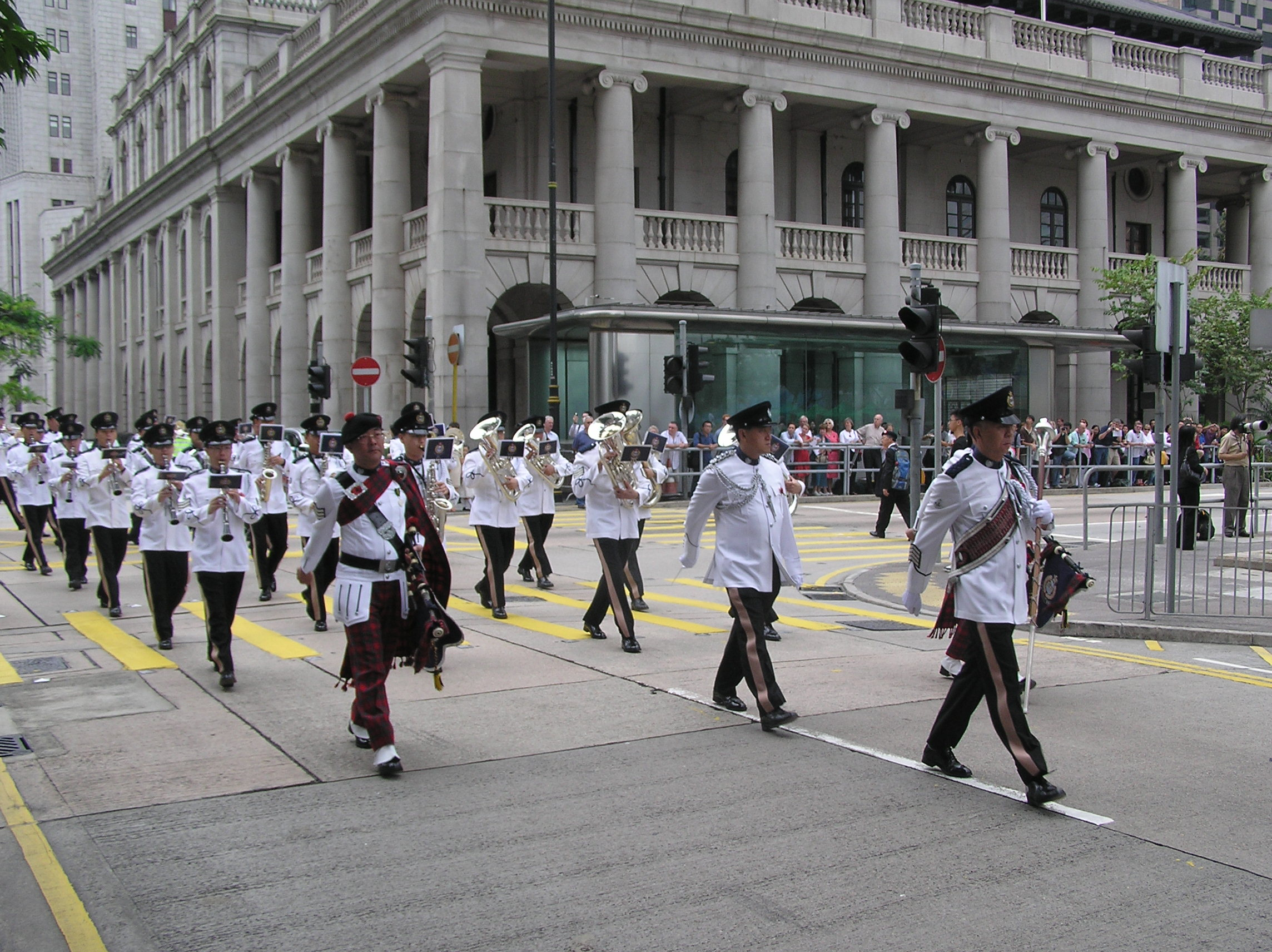

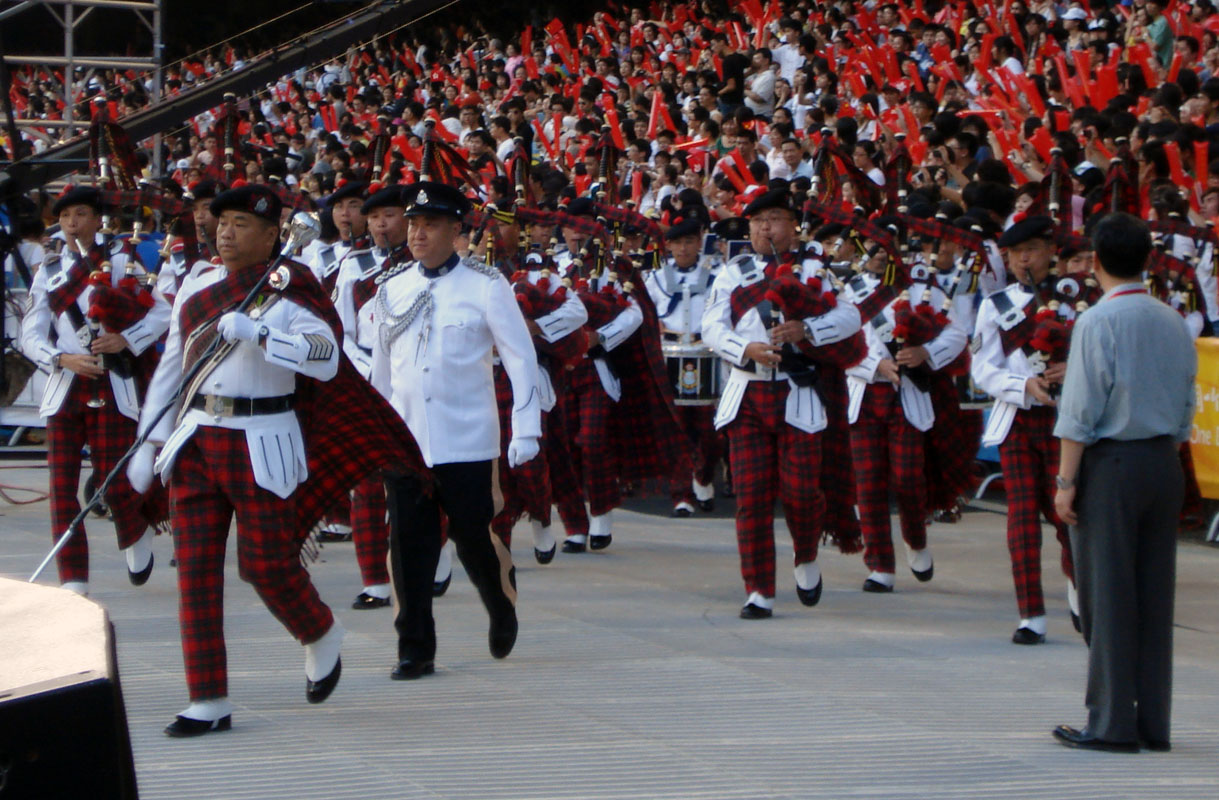

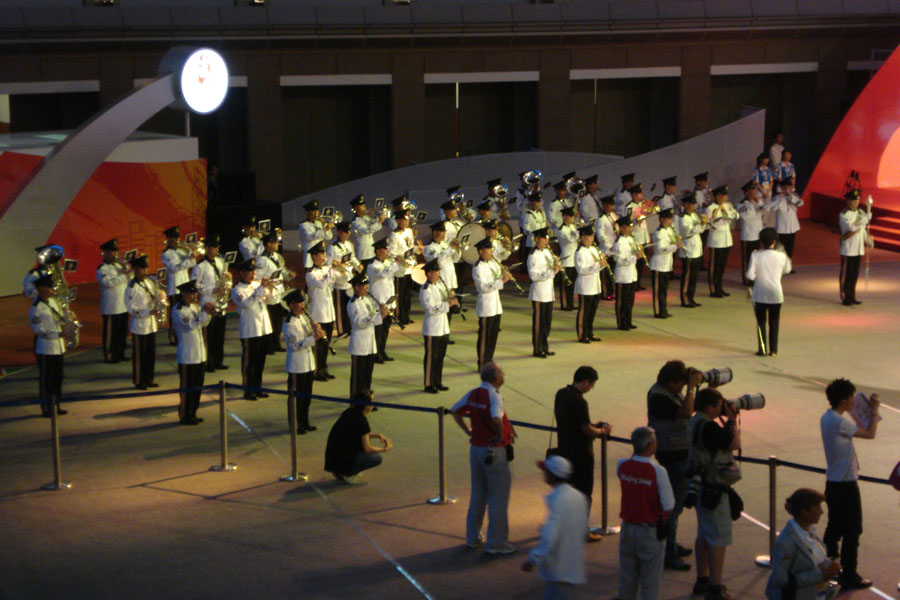

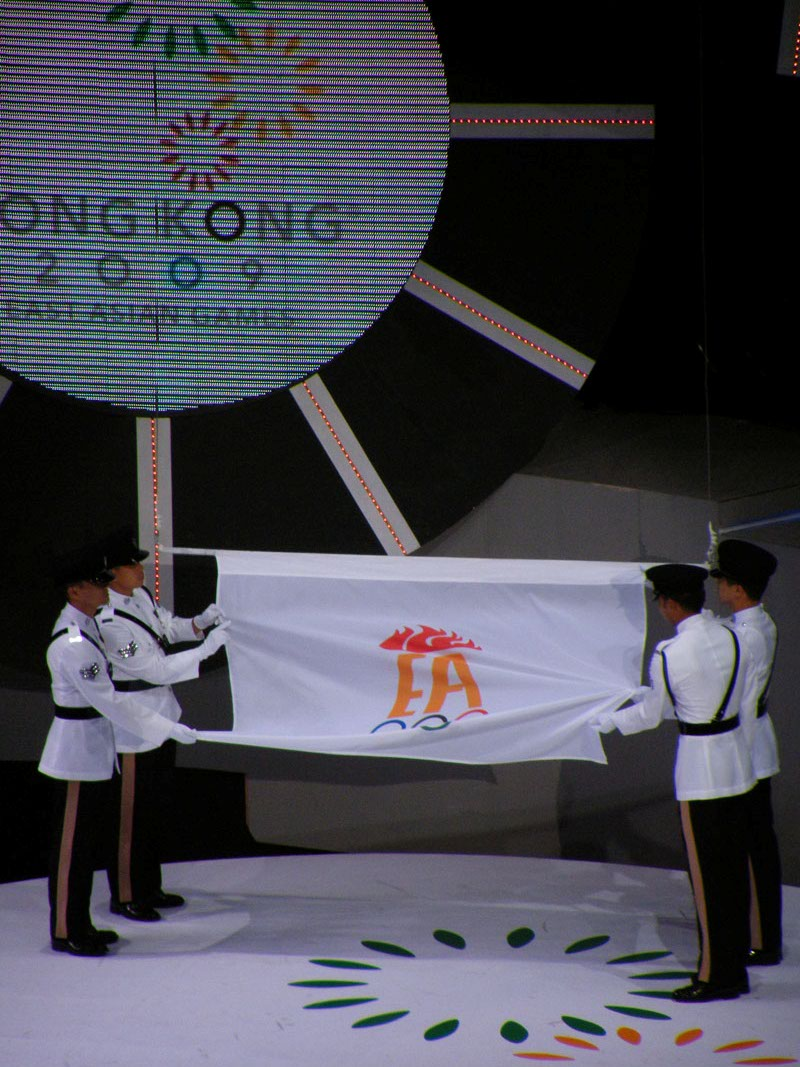

== Police Report ==
- Police Report - 2015-2-21 - Topic: Police Encyclopedia-Police Band (Part 1 of 3)
- Police Report - 2015-2-28 - Topic: Police Encyclopedia-Police Band (Part 2 of 3)
- Police Report - 2015-3-07 - Topic: Police Encyclopedia-Police Band (Part 3 of 3)
