= Police Dog Unit =

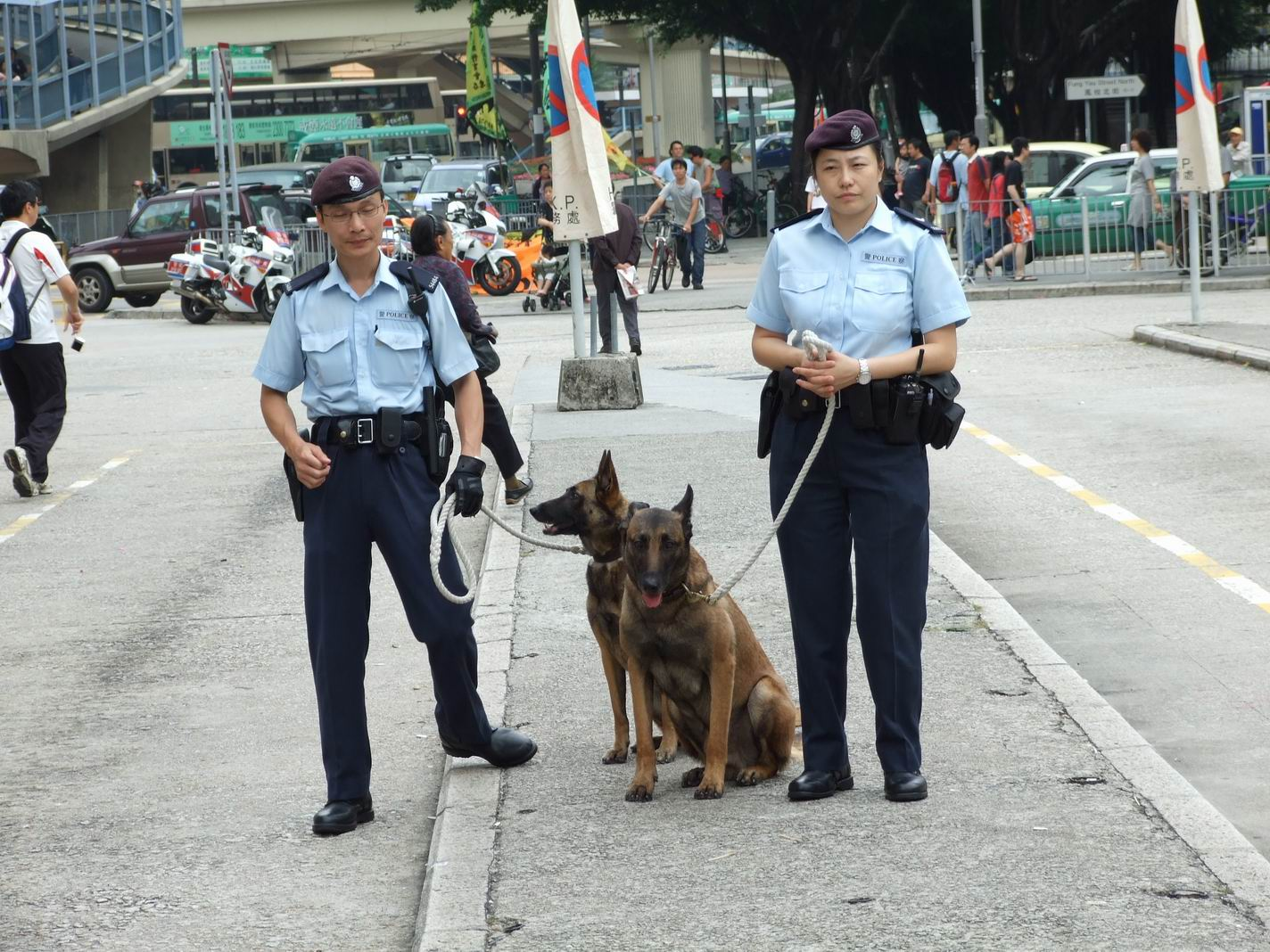
- 2 Police Dog Unit officers with K-9
- Active: 1949-Present
- Country: Hong Kong (1949-1997); Hong Kong; (1997-Present)
- Branch: Hong Kong Police Force
- Type: Police dog unit
- Role: Crowd control, search and rescue and poison and explosive detection.

The Police Dog Unit, (Abbreviation: PDU; Chinese: 警犬隊) established in 1949, is a specialist force of the Hong Kong Police under the direct command of the Special Operations Bureau. Its role is in crowd control, search and rescue and poison and explosive detection. In addition, the Police Dog Unit works in collaboration with other departments for anti-crime operations.

== See also ==
- Police dog
