= Yuk Wong Kung Din =

Temple in Shau Kei Wan, Hong Kong

Coordinates: 22.282224°N 114.233253°E

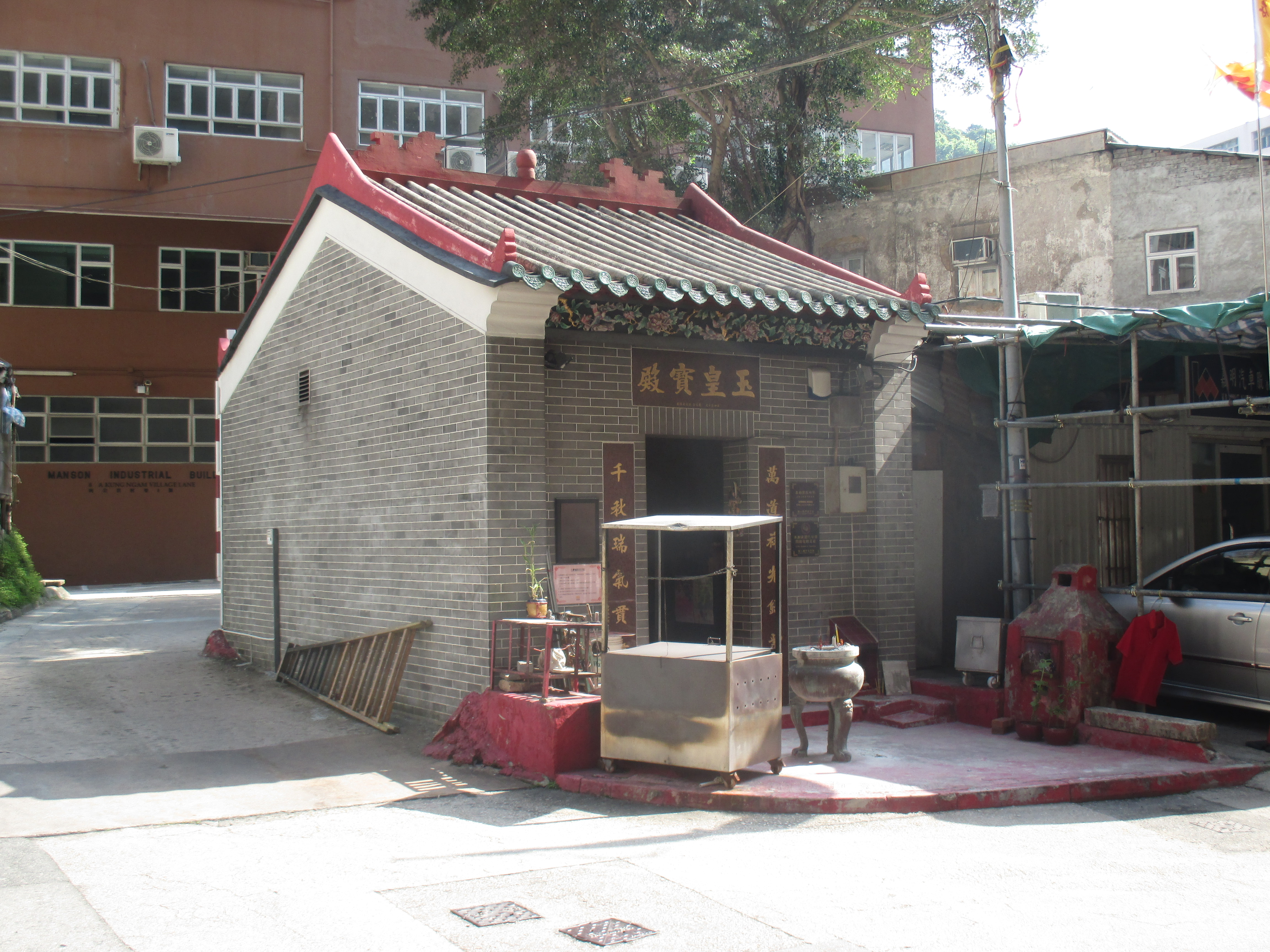
Yuk Wong Kung Din

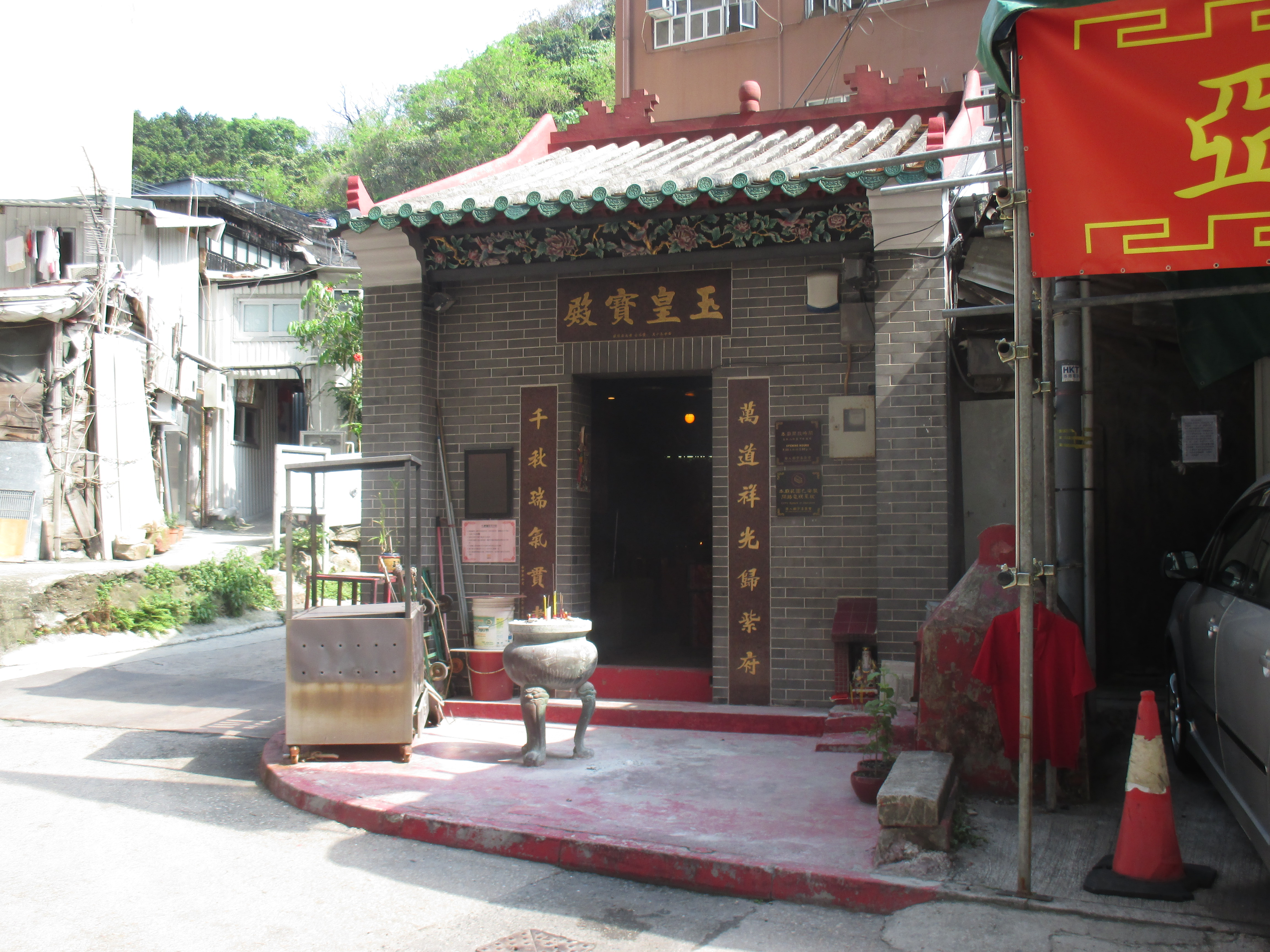
Yuk Wong Kung Din

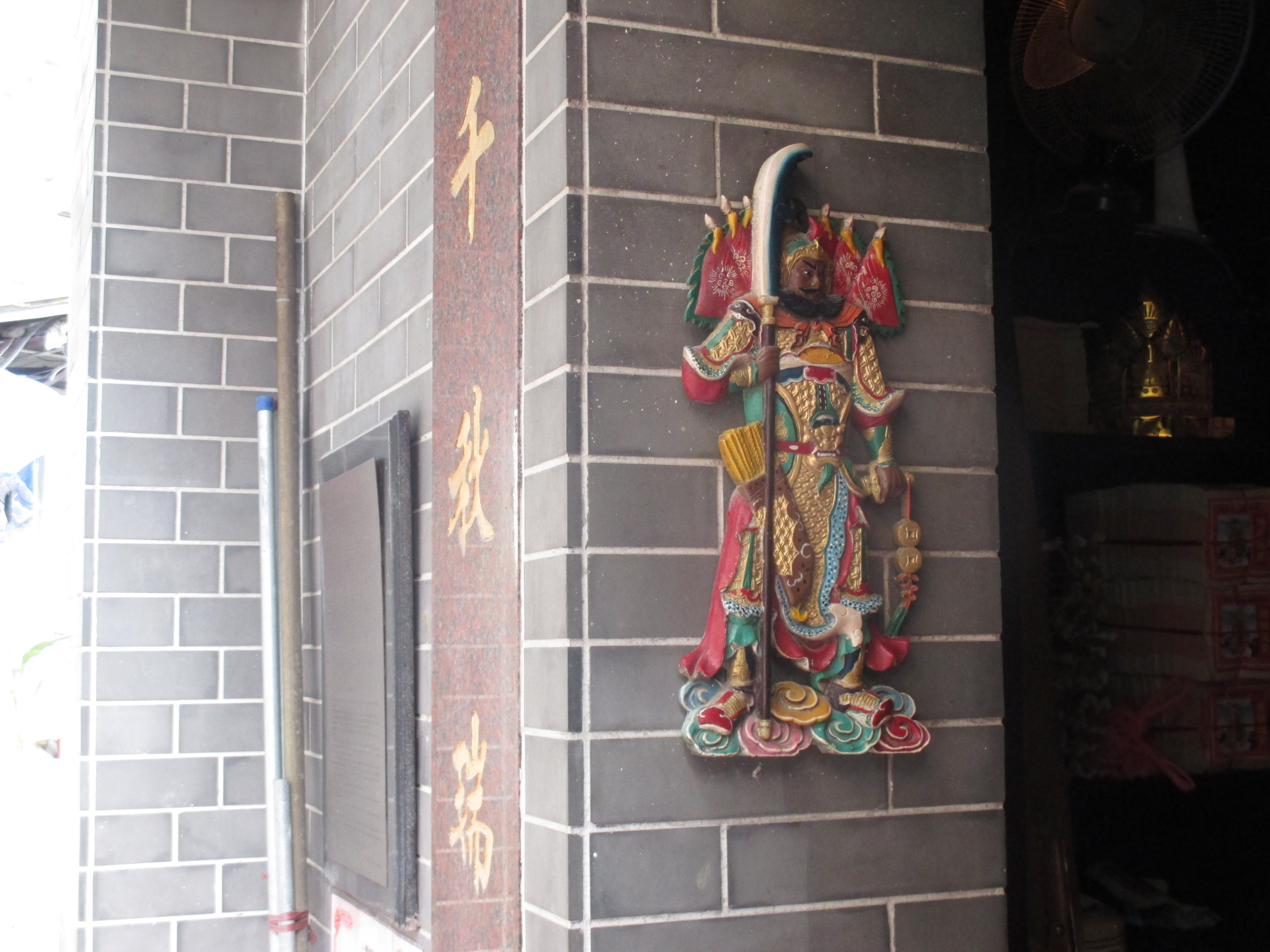
Menshen

The Yuk Wong Temple aka. Yuk Wong Kung Din (Chinese: 玉皇宮殿) or Yuk Wong Bo Din (玉皇寶殿) is a temple located at No. 26A A Kung Ngam Village Lane, A Kung Ngam, Shau Kei Wan, Hong Kong.

The temple is dedicated to the Jade Emperor (玉皇, Yuk Wong in Cantonese). Two side altars are dedicated to Tin Hau (left of the main altar) and Kwun Yam (right).

The temple is managed by the Chinese Temples Committee. The interior of the temple can be explored with Google Street View.

== History ==
In the mid 19th century, people from Huizhou and Chaozhou quarried stones in the hill for the development of the central urban area. They set up a shrine to worship Yuk Wong. At the beginning of the 20th century, the shrine was developed into a small temple and was renovated many times. The latest renovation was in 1992.

== Festivals ==
The Jade Emperor's Birthday is celebrated at the temple starting from the night of 8th day of first lunar month (during Chinese New Year period).

== See also ==
- Jade Emperor
- Yuanching Temple, Changhua, Taiwan
- Fengshan Tiangong Temple, Kaohsiung, Taiwan
- Jade Emperor Pagoda, Ho Chi Minh City, Vietnam
- Thni Kong Tnua, Penang, Malaysia
- Tin Hau temples in Hong Kong
