= Yuanching Temple =

Temple in Changhua City, Changhua County, Taiwan

- 元清觀
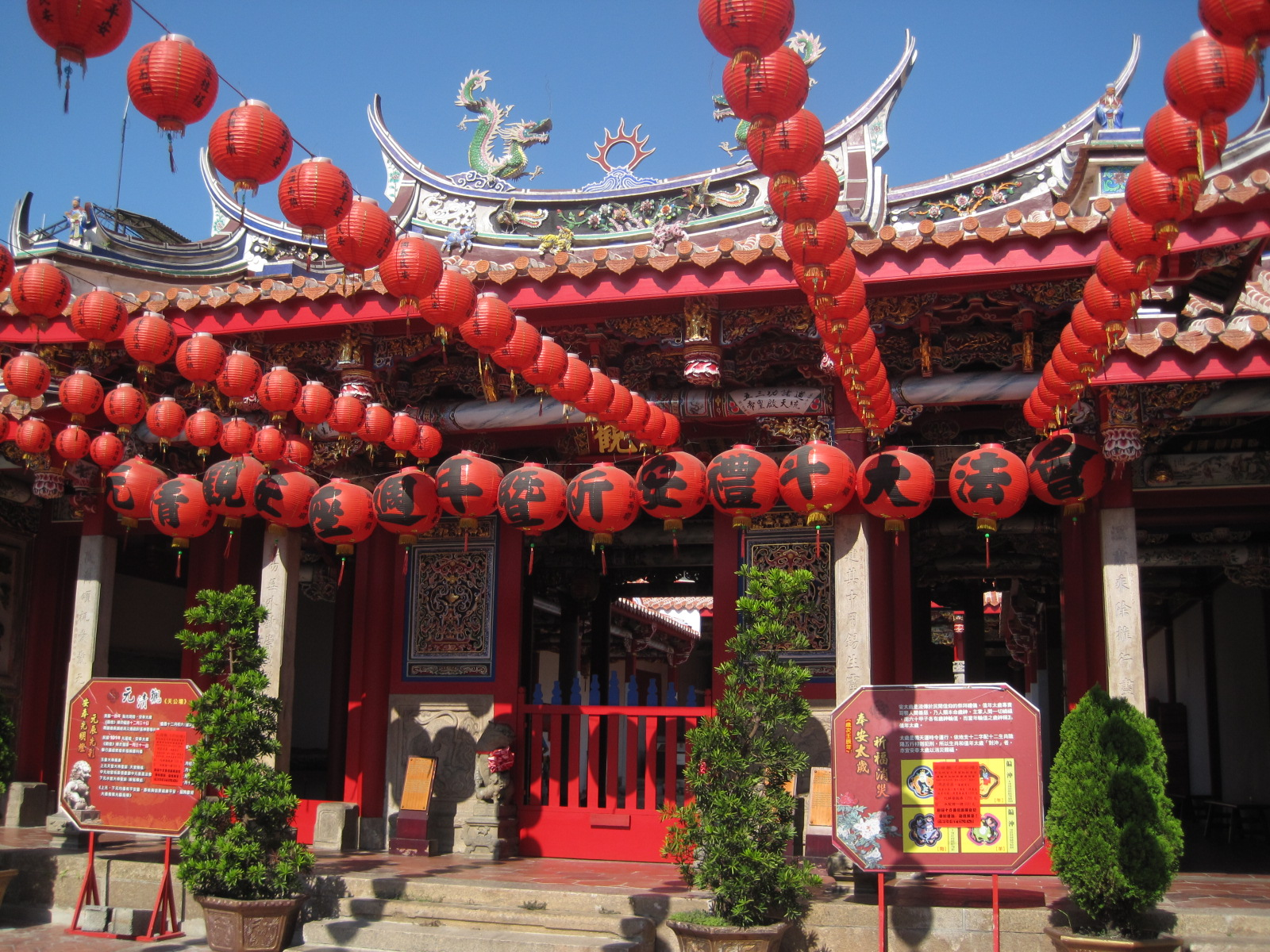

- Location within Changhua County

Location
- Location: Changhua City, Changhua County, Taiwan
- Interactive map of Yuanching Temple
- Coordinates: 24°04′46.5″N 120°32′33.0″E

Architecture
- Type: temple
- Completed: 1763

The Yuanching Temple (traditional Chinese: 元清觀; simplified Chinese: 元清观; pinyin: Yuánqīng Guān) is a temple in Changhua City, Changhua County, Taiwan.

== History ==
The temple was constructed in 1763 in which it became the first temple in Taiwan to worship Jade Emperor. In 1887, it underwent renovation in which a grand theater stage was added.

== Architecture ==
The temple was constructed with early years of Qing Dynasty architectural style.

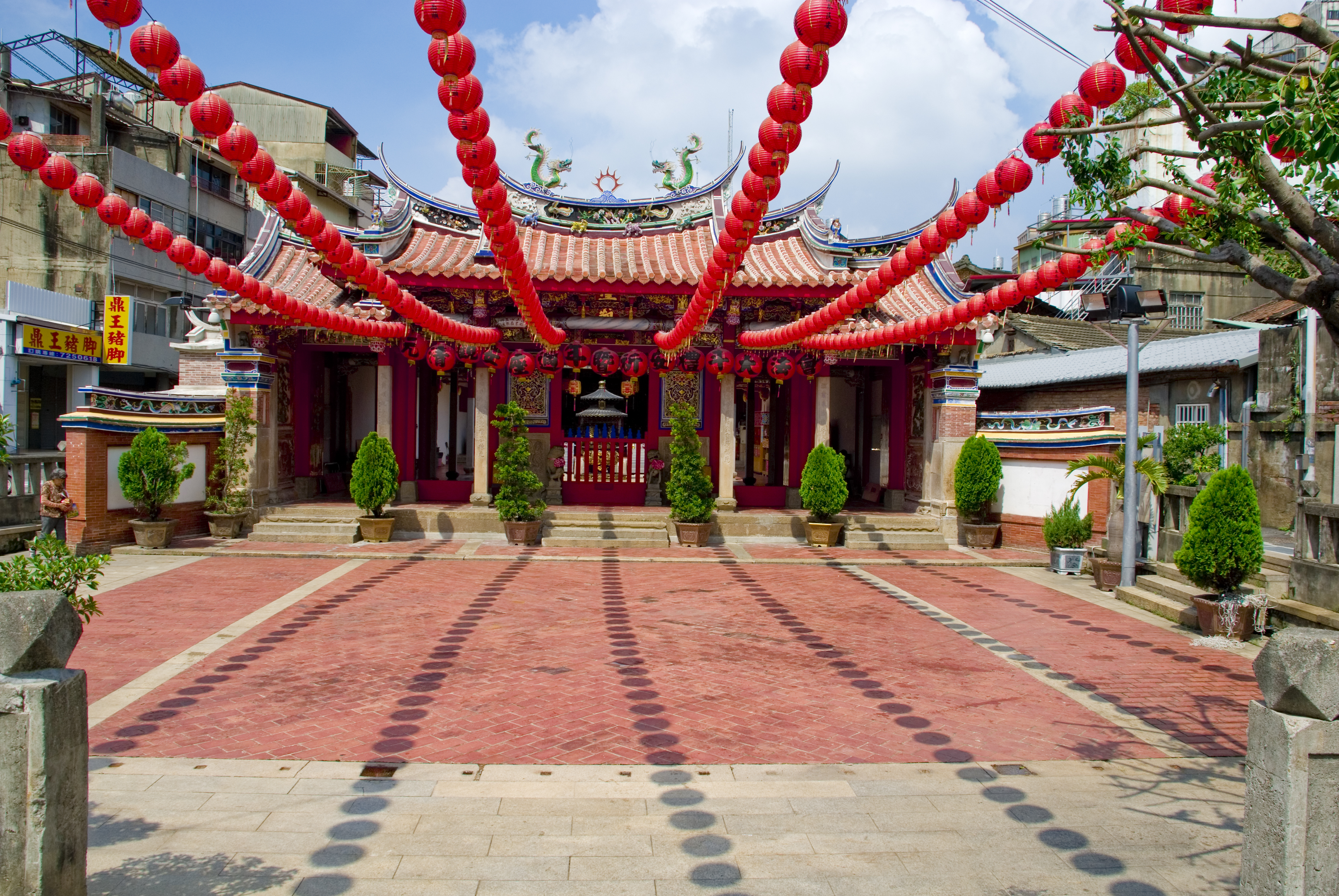
元清觀

== Transportation ==
The temple is accessible within walking distance southeast of Changhua Station of Taiwan Railway.

== See also ==
- Fengshan Tiangong Temple, Taiwan
- Jade Emperor Pagoda, Vietnam
- Yuk Wong Kung Tin, Hong Kong
- Thni Kong Tnua, Malaysia
- List of temples in Taiwan
- List of tourist attractions in Taiwan
