= Jade Emperor =

Type of god in Chinese culture

- God of Heaven
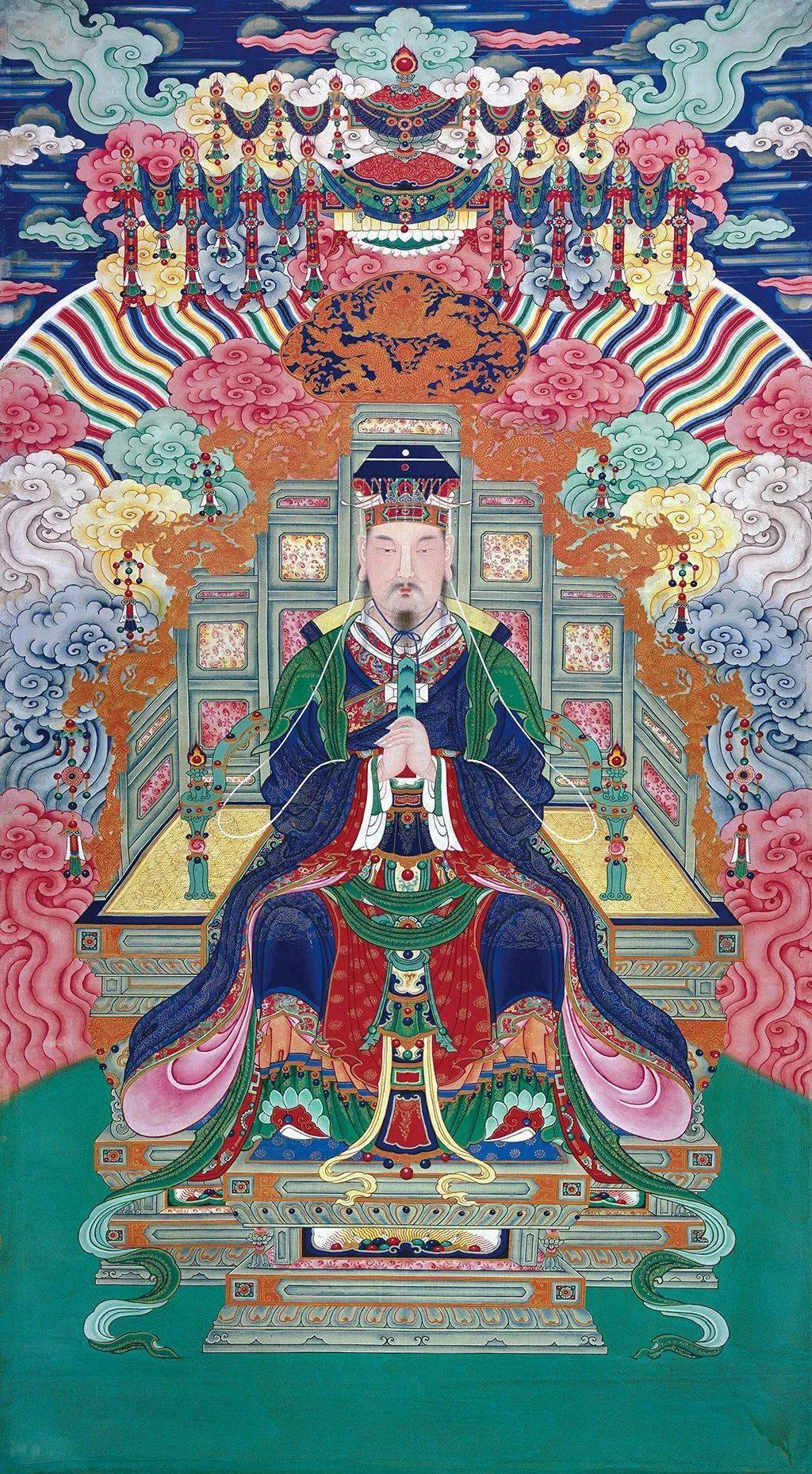
- Ink and color painting on silk of the Jade Emperor, Ming dynasty (16th century)
- Other names

Chinese name
- Chinese: 玉皇
- Literal meaning: Jade emperor
Transcriptions
Standard Mandarin
- Hanyu Pinyin: Yùhuáng
Southern Min
- Hokkien POJ: Gio̍k-hông

Second alternative Chinese name
- Chinese: 天公
- Literal meaning: Heavenly grandfather
Transcriptions
Standard Mandarin
- Hanyu Pinyin: Tiāngōng
Southern Min
- Hokkien POJ: Thiⁿ-kong
- Tâi-lô: Thinn-kong

Third alternative Chinese name
- Chinese: 玉皇大帝
- Literal meaning: August emperor of jade
Transcriptions
Standard Mandarin
- Hanyu Pinyin: Yùhuáng Dàdì
Southern Min
- Hokkien POJ: Gio̍k-hông-tāi-tè
- Venerated in: Taoism; Chinese folk religion Korean shamanism
- Abode: Heaven
- Gender: Male
- Region: China
- Ethnic group: Chinese
- Associated deities: Tian, Shangdi

Equivalents
- Hindu: Indra
- Buddhist: Śakra
- Japanese: Izanagi
- Korean: Hwanin

In the myths and folk religion of Chinese culture, the Jade Emperor or Yudi is one of the representations of the primordial god.

In Taoist theology, he is the assistant of Yuanshi Tianzun, who is one of the Three Pure Ones, the three primordial emanations of the Tao. However, some Taoists in history were skeptical of his benevolence because his buildings and infrastructure in heaven and earth were sometimes seen as interfering with the many natural laws or dao.

He is often identified with Śakra in Chinese Buddhist cosmology and identified with Yu the Great in Chinese mythology.

The Jade Emperor is known by many names, including Yu; Heavenly Grandfather (Chinese: 天公, romanized: Tiāngōng), which originally meant "Heavenly Duke" (and which is used by commoners); the Jade Lord; the Highest Emperor; and Great Emperor of Jade (玉皇上帝, Yu Huang Shangdi, or 玉皇大帝, Yu Huang Dadi).

== Chinese mythology ==
There are many stories in Chinese mythology involving the Jade Emperor. He can also be regarded as a traditional figure among the White Lotus Societies.

=== Origin ===
It was said that Jade Emperor was originally the crown prince of the kingdom of Pure Felicity and Majestic Heavenly Lights and Ornaments. At birth, he emitted a wondrous light that filled the entire kingdom. When he was young, he was kind, intelligent and wise. He devoted his entire childhood to helping the needy (the poor and suffering, the deserted and single, the hungry and disabled). Furthermore, he showed respect and benevolence to both men and creatures. After his father died, he ascended the throne. He made sure that everyone in his kingdom found peace and contentment. After that, he told his ministers that he wished to cultivate Tao on the Bright and Fragrant Cliff.

After 17,501,750 eons, each eon lasting for 129,600 years (360^{2} years), he attained Golden Immortality. After another one hundred million years of cultivation, he finally became the Jade Emperor. (Using the given figures, this period before his becoming the Jade Emperor lasted for a total of about 327.000.000.327.000.000 years.)

=== Vanquishing evil ===
One of the myths describes how the Jade Emperor became the monarch of all the deities in heaven. It is one of the few myths in which the Jade Emperor shows his power.

At the beginning of time, the earth was a very difficult place to live, much harsher than it is now. People had to deal with a variety of monstrous beings, and they did not have many gods to protect them; in addition, many powerful demons were defying the immortals of heaven. The Jade Emperor was an ordinary immortal who roamed the earth helping as many people as he could. He was saddened because his powers could only ease the suffering of humans. He retreated to a mountain cave to cultivate his Tao. He passed 3,200 trials, each trial lasting about 3 million years.

On earth at this time, a powerful, evil entity had the ambition to conquer the immortals and gods in heaven and proclaim sovereignty over the entire universe. This evil entity also went into retreat and meditation to expand its power, though later than the Jade Emperor did. He passed through 3,000 trials, each trial lasting about 3 million years. After its final trial, it felt confident that no one could defeat it. It re-entered the world and recruited an army of demons with the purpose of attacking heaven. The immortals, being aware of the threat, gathered themselves and prepared for war. The gods were unable to stop the powerful demon, and it defeated them all.

The Jade Emperor finished his cultivation during this war. When he was changing the land to make it more livable for men and repelling a variety of monsters, he saw an evil glow radiating from heaven and knew something was amiss. He ascended and saw that the evil entity was too powerful to be stopped by the gods. He challenged it, and they fought. Mountains shook, and rivers and seas toppled. Due to his deeper and wiser cultivation, his benevolence instead of his might, the Jade Emperor won the battle. After the evil entity was defeated, its army was scattered by the gods and immortals. Because of his noble and benevolent deeds, the gods, immortals, and humans proclaimed the Jade Emperor the supreme sovereign of all.

=== Creation ===
The world started with wuji (simplified Chinese: 无极; traditional Chinese: 無極; pinyin: wújí, 'nothingness') according to the Chinese creation myth. The Jade Emperor was the head of the pantheon, but not responsible for creation.

In another creation myth, the Jade Emperor fashioned the first humans from clay and left them to harden in the sun. Rain deformed some of the figures, which gave rise to human sickness and physical abnormalities. (The most common alternative Chinese creation myth states that human beings were once fleas on the body of Pangu.)

In another myth, Nüwa fashions men out of the mud from the Yellow River by hand. Those she made became the richest people on earth. After getting tired of it, she dipped her scarf into the mud and swung it around. The drops that fell from the scarf became the poorer humans.

=== The Cowherd and the Weaver Girl ===
In another story, popular throughout Asia and with many differing versions, the Jade Emperor has a daughter named Zhinü (simplified Chinese: 织女; traditional Chinese: 織女; pinyin: zhī nǚ or Chih'nü; lit. 'weaver girl'). She is most often represented as responsible for weaving colorful clouds in heaven. In some versions, she is the Goddess Weaver, daughter of the Jade Emperor and the Celestial Queen Mother, who weaves the Silver River (known in the West as the Milky Way), which gives light to heaven and earth. In other versions, she is a seamstress who works for the Jade Emperor.

Every day, Zhinü descended to earth with the aid of a magical robe to bathe. One day, a lowly cowherd named Niu Lang (Chinese: 牛郎; pinyin: niú láng) spotted Zhinü as she bathed in a stream. Niu Lang fell instantly in love with her and stole her magic robe, which she had left on the bank of the stream, leaving her unable to escape back to Heaven. When Zhinü emerged from the water, Niu Lang grabbed her and carried her back to his home.

When the Jade Emperor heard of this matter, he was furious but unable to intercede, since in the meantime his daughter had fallen in love and married the cowherd. As time passed, Zhinü grew homesick and began to miss her father. One day, she came across a box containing her magic robe, which her husband had hidden. She decided to visit her father back in Heaven, but once she returned, the Jade Emperor summoned a river to flow across the sky (the Milky Way), which Zhinü was unable to cross to return to her husband. The Emperor took pity on the young lovers, and so once a year on the seventh day of the seventh month of the lunar calendar, he allows them to meet on a bridge over the river.

The story refers to constellations in the night sky. Zhinü is the star Vega in the constellation of Lyra east of the Milky Way, and Niu Lang is the star Altair in the constellation of Aquila west of the Milky Way. Under the first quarter moon (7th day) of the seventh lunar month (around August), the lighting condition in the sky causes the Milky Way to appear dimmer, hence the story that the two lovers are no longer separated on that one particular day each year.

The seventh day of the seventh month of the lunar calendar is a holiday in China called Qixi Festival, which is a day for young lovers much like Valentine's Day in the West. In Japan, it is called Tanabata (star day). In Korea, it is called Chilseok. In Vietnam, it is called Thất Tịch, and if it rains on that day, it is said to be Zhinü crying tears of happiness for being reunited with her husband.

=== The Chinese Zodiac ===
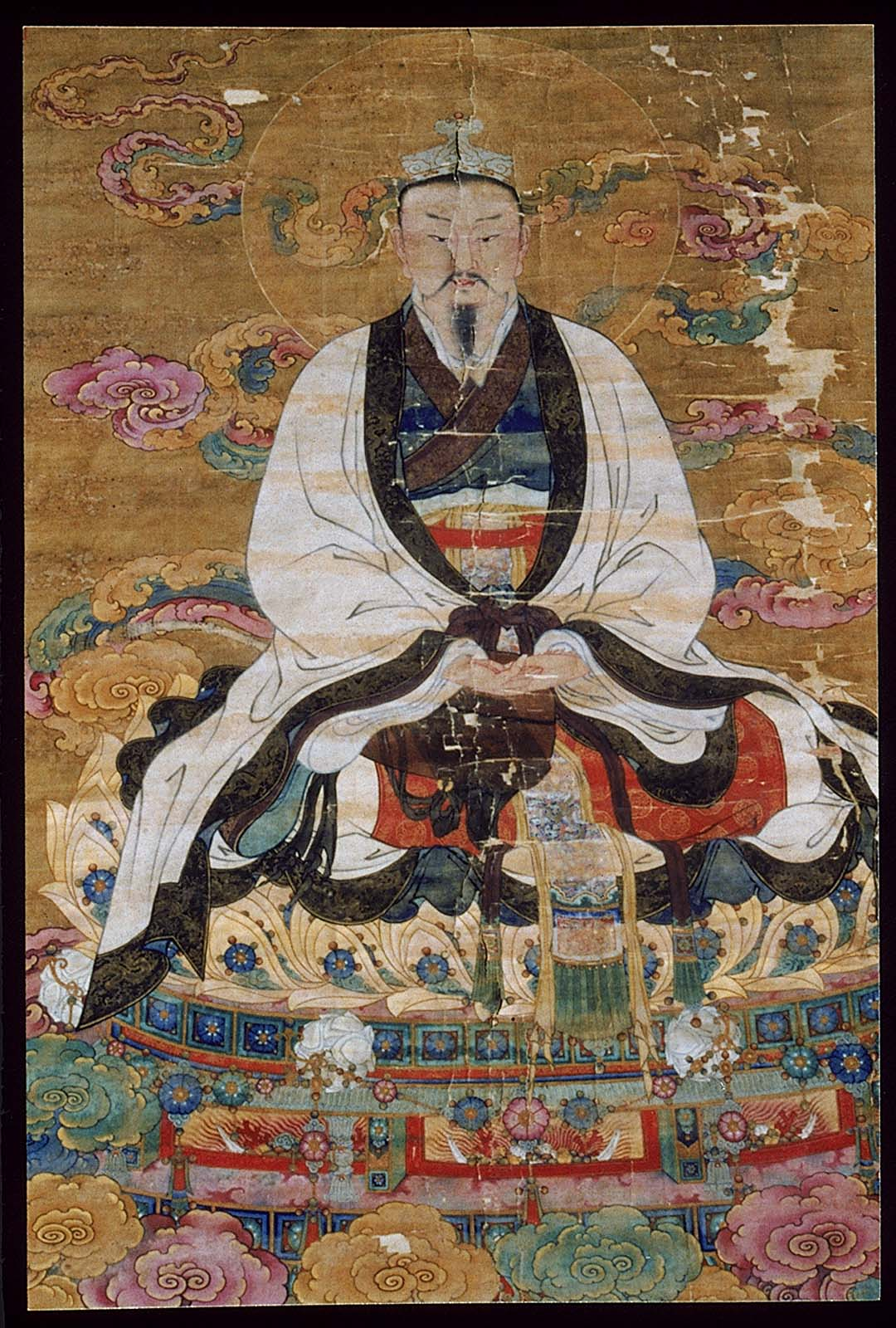
Portrait of the Jade Emperor, 16th century, Ming dynasty (Museum of Fine Arts, Boston)

There are several stories as to how the twelve animals of the Chinese zodiac were chosen. In one, the Jade Emperor, although having ruled Heaven and Earth justly and wisely for many years, had never had time to visit Earth personally. He grew curious as to what the creatures looked like. Thus, he asked all the animals to visit him in heaven. The Cat, being the most handsome of all animals, asked his friend the Rat to wake him on the day they were to go to Heaven so he would not oversleep. The Rat, however, was worried that he would seem ugly compared to the Cat, so he did not wake the Cat. Consequently, the Cat missed the meeting with the Jade Emperor and was replaced by the Pig. The Jade Emperor was delighted with the animals and so decided to divide the years among them. When the Cat learned of what had happened, he was furious with the Rat, and that, according to the story, is why cats and rats are enemies to this day. The Cat can be seen as the domesticated Tiger, the third of the animals in the classical Chinese Zodiac text.

=== The Four Dragons ===
Once, a great drought had spread across the land. Four dragons from the sea noticed the plight of the people and traveled to beseech the Jade Emperor in the Heavenly Palace to bring the rains to the people. He was very busy ruling the heavens, the earth, and the sea, and, distracted, agreed to send the rains the next day if they would return to the sea, but soon after the dragons departed, he forgot his promise.

After ten days, the rains still did not come, and the people began to die of starvation. The dragons could not simply stand by and do nothing, and so they decided to use their bodies to capture great masses of water from the sea, taking it upon themselves to bring the rain. The people were grateful and prayed their thanks to the Jade Emperor, who soon discovered what the dragons had done and became angry that they intervened without his blessing.

The Jade Emperor ordered Mountain God to trap the four dragons. However, from each mountain that trapped a dragon there sprang a new river. From Yellow Dragon came the Yellow River, from Long Dragon the Yangtze River, from Black Dragon the Amur River, and from Pearl Dragon the Pearl River. The rivers thereafter flowed from west to east and north to south, the dragons ensuring that the people of China would never be without water again.

=== His predecessor and successor ===
The Jade Emperor was originally the assistant of the Divine Master of the Heavenly Origin, Yuanshi Tianzun. Yuanshi Tianzun is said to be the supreme beginning, the limitless and eternal creator of Heaven and Earth, who picked Yu-huang, or the Jade Emperor, as his personal successor.

The Jade Emperor will eventually be succeeded by the Heavenly Master of the Dawn of Jade of the Golden Door (金闕玉晨天尊). The characters for both are stamped on the front of the arms of his throne.

In two folk automatic writing texts produced in 1925 and 1972, Guan Yu became the 18th Jade Emperor in about 1840 AD; however, some have disagreed that Guan Yu has succeeded, and thus the Jade Emperor and Guan Yu are often worshiped separately. In Tienti teaching, the reigning Jade Emperor has 55 predecessors. However, this is from the point of view of Chinese folk religion, and many orthodox Taoists do not believe these claims to be true.

== Worship and festivals ==
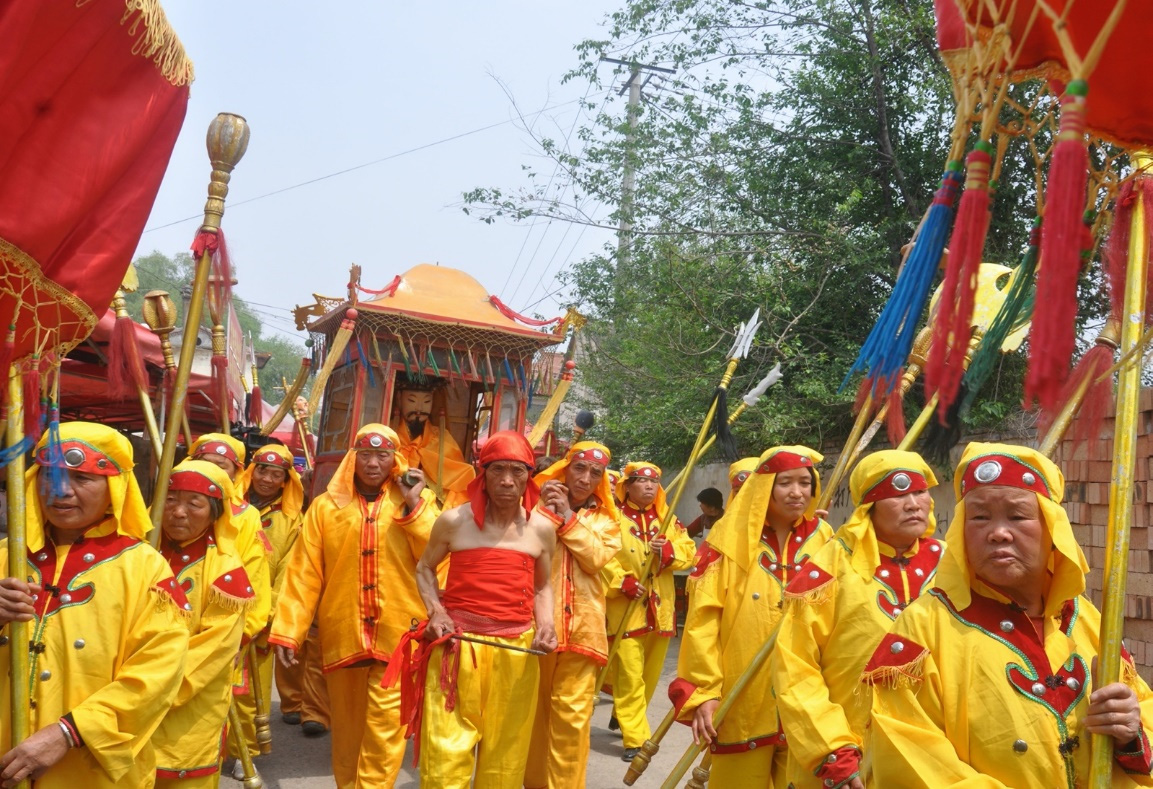
Ritual participants carry the statue of Jade Emperor in a sedan chair at a sacrificial procession in Shanxi, 2016.

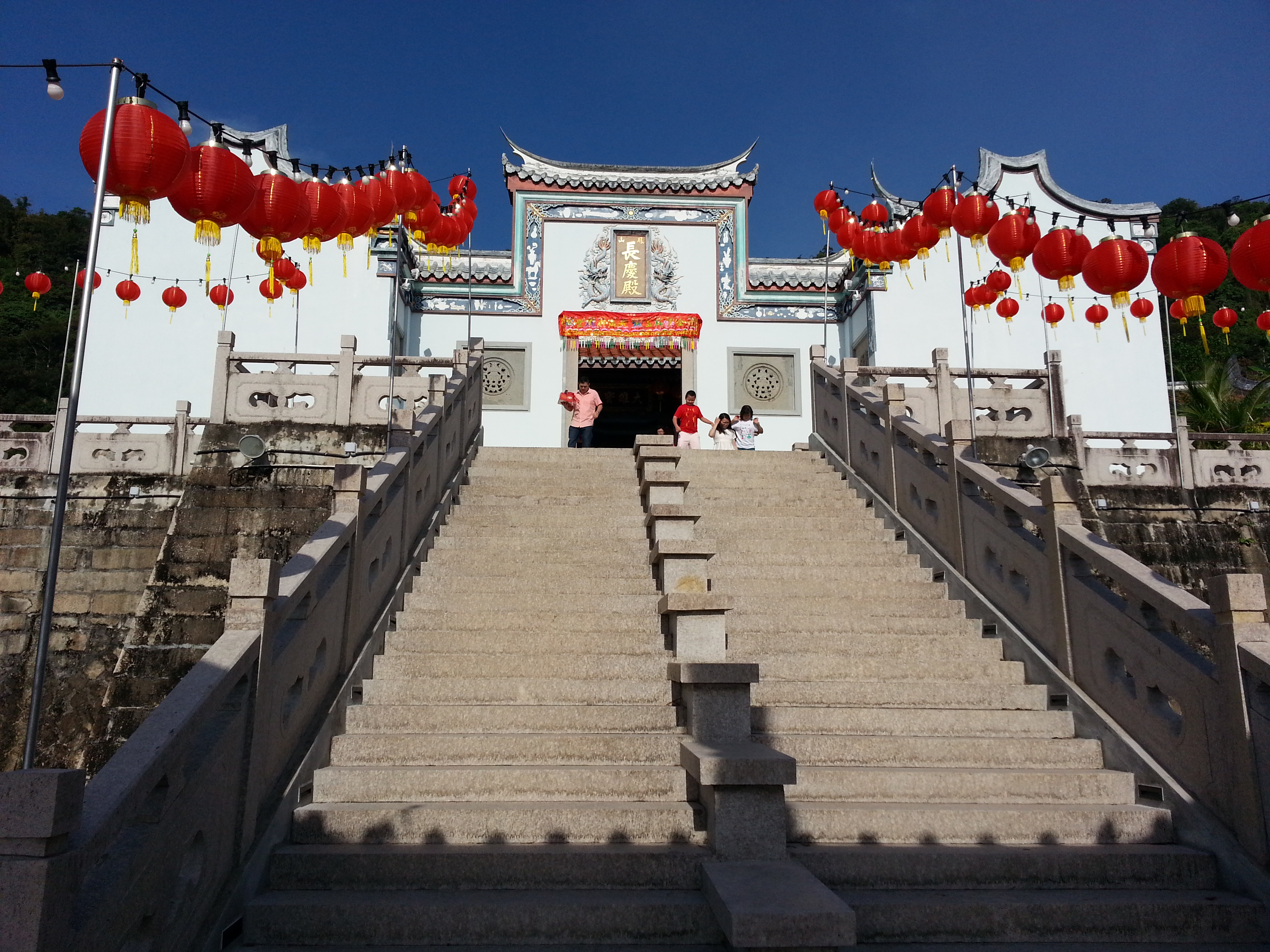
Thni Kong Tnua in Air Itam, Penang, Malaysia was specifically built in honor of the Jade Emperor.

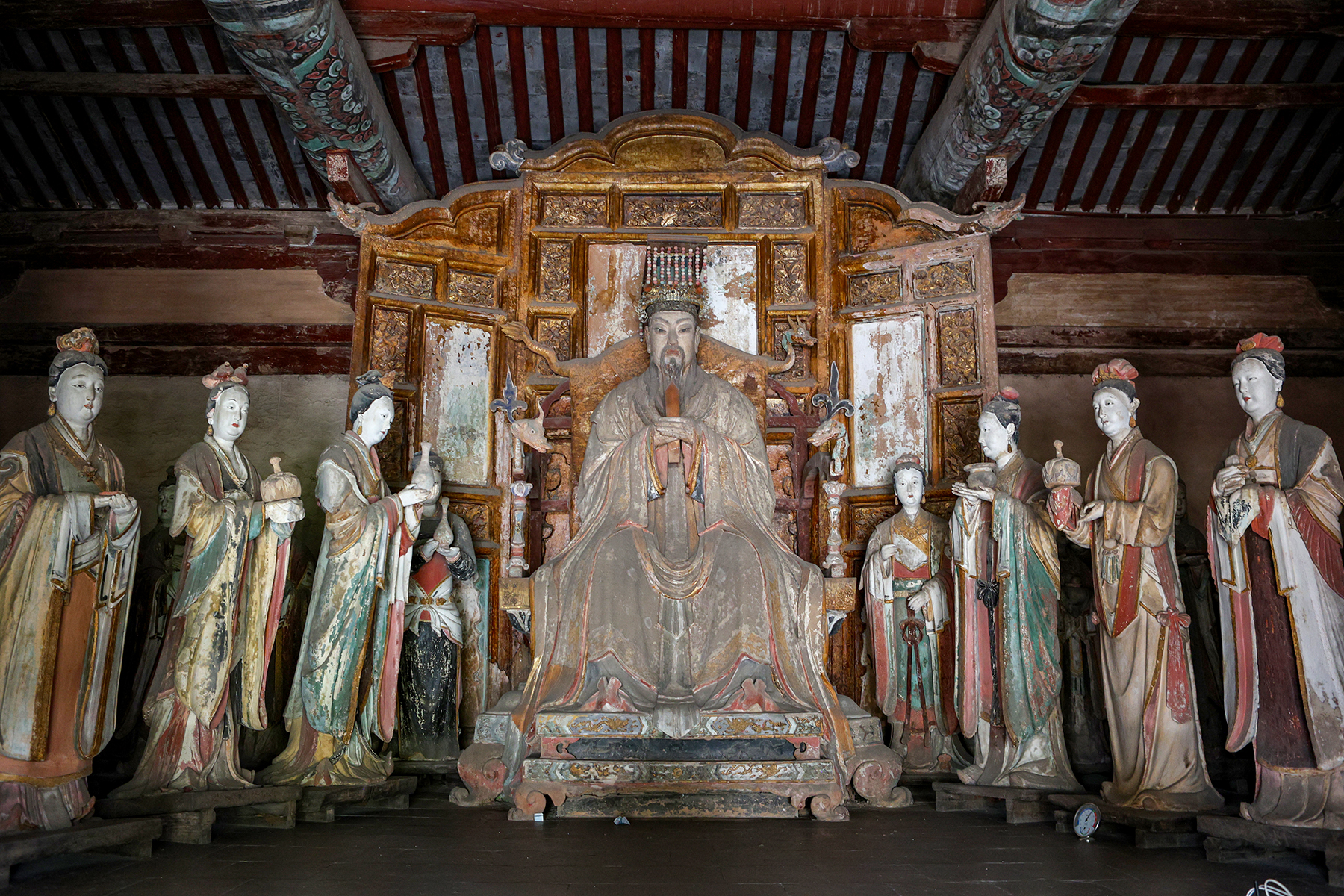
Ming dynasty statue of Jade Emperor at Yuhuang Temple, Fucheng.

Elements from the supreme god Shangdi and his worship were incorporated into theology about the Jade Emperor, and the two were often thought to be the same being.

The Jade Emperor's Birthday (simplified Chinese: 天公诞; traditional Chinese: 天公誕; pinyin: tiāngōng dàn) is said to be the ninth day of the first lunar month. On this day, Taoist temples hold a Jade Emperor ritual (拜天公, Mandarin: bài Tiāngōng; Hokkien: pài Thinn-kong, literally "heaven worship") at which priests and laymen prostrate themselves, burn incense and make food offerings.

In the morning of this birthday, Chinese, Taiwanese as well as Hokkien and Peranakan Malaysian Chinese and Singaporean Chinese who practice Buddhism, Taoism and other traditional Chinese religions set up an altar table with 3 layers: one top (containing offertories of six vegetables (六齋), noodles, fruits, cakes, tangyuan, vegetable bowls, and unripe betel, all decorated with paper lanterns) and two lower levels (containing the five sacrifices and wines) to honor the deities below the Jade Emperor. The household then kneels three times and kowtows nine times to pay homage and wish him a long life.

In Penang, Malaysia, a focal point of the Jade Emperor's Birthday celebrations is Thni Kong Tnua, which gained worldwide fame as one of the featured locations for The Amazing Race 16. The temple, built in 1869, is located at the foot of Penang Hill at the Air Itam suburb near George Town, Penang's capital city. Aside from Thni Kong Tnua, the Chew Jetty in the heart of George Town is another focal point of the Jade Emperor's Birthday celebrations; the festivities in this particular location was captured for a 2014 Malaysian film, The Journey.

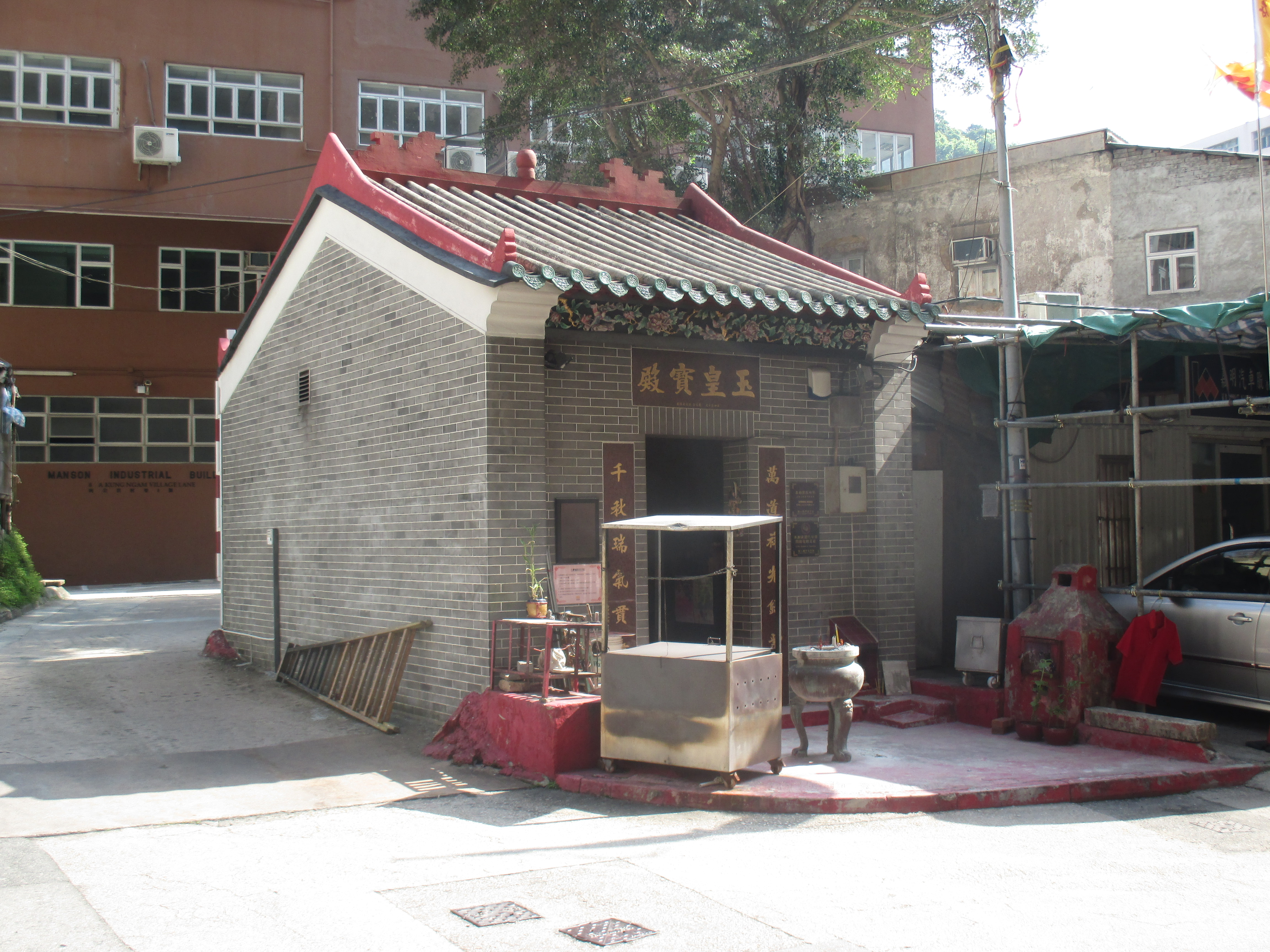
Yuk Wong Po Tin in A Kung Ngam, Hong Kong.

Yuk Wong Kung Tin (Cantonese romanisation) (玉皇宮殿) also known as Yuk Wong Po Tin (玉皇寶殿) is a temple in A Kung Ngam, Hong Kong, dedicated to the Jade Emperor. In the mid-19th century, people from Huizhou and Chaozhou mined stones from the hill to support the development of the central urban area. They set up a shrine to worship Yuk Wong. At the beginning of the 20th century, the shrine was developed into a small temple and was renovated many times. The latest renovation was in 1992.

Early Catholic missionaries to China often wrote about the Jade Emperor. They noticed that "The stories of Jesus and the Jade Sovereign are, in certain aspects, quite similar. In both cases it is claimed that a god incarnated as a human being." On the other hand, they denounced the cult of the Jade Emperor as "superstitious" and compared unfavorably the "legends" about the Jade Emperor with what they claimed was a solid historical record documenting the existence and life of Jesus.

In 2005, roughly 2% of Chinese folk practitioners believed in the Jade Emperor.

== Toponyms ==
A crater on Saturn's moon Rhea, discovered by Voyager 2 spacecraft, is named after him.

== In popular culture ==
- Features as a playable mage in the MOBA video game Smite, released in April 2022.
- The adaptation of Chinese deities into the Advanced Dungeons & Dragons role-playing game included an "Emperor of the Heavens" named Shang-Ti in the books Deities & Demigods and Legends & Lore, and a "Celestial Emperor" in the Kara-Tur campaign setting, as head of the pantheon.
- Appears in the military science fiction television series Stargate SG-1 as a Goa'uld System Lord named Yu-huang Shang Ti.
- In the horror role-playing game Kindred of the East, where he is referred as the "August Personage of Jade" and is said to have cursed the Wan Xian, transforming them into the Kuei-jin, vampiric beings portrayed by the game's player characters.
- Jun Wu from the series Heaven Officials Blessing is their version of the Jade Emperor.

== See also ==
- Tian
- Shangdi
- Yuanching Temple, Taiwan
- Fengshan Tiangong Temple, Taiwan
- Jade Emperor Pagoda, Vietnam
- Yuk Wong Kung Din, Hong Kong
- Thni Kong Tnua, Malaysia
- Chinese folk religion
- King of the gods

Counterparts of the Jade Emperor in other Asian cultures

- Amenominakanushi, the Japanese counterpart
- Haneunim, the Korean counterpart
- Indra, the Hindu counterpart
- Śakra, the Buddhist counterpart
- Ülgen/Qormusta Tengri, the Turko-Mongolian counterpart
- Thagyamin, the Burmese Buddhist representation of Śakra, a counterpart of the Jade Emperor
- Ông Trời, the Vietnamese counterpart
