= Fengshan Longshan Temple =

Temple in Fengshan, Kaohsiung, Taiwan

- 鳳山龍山寺
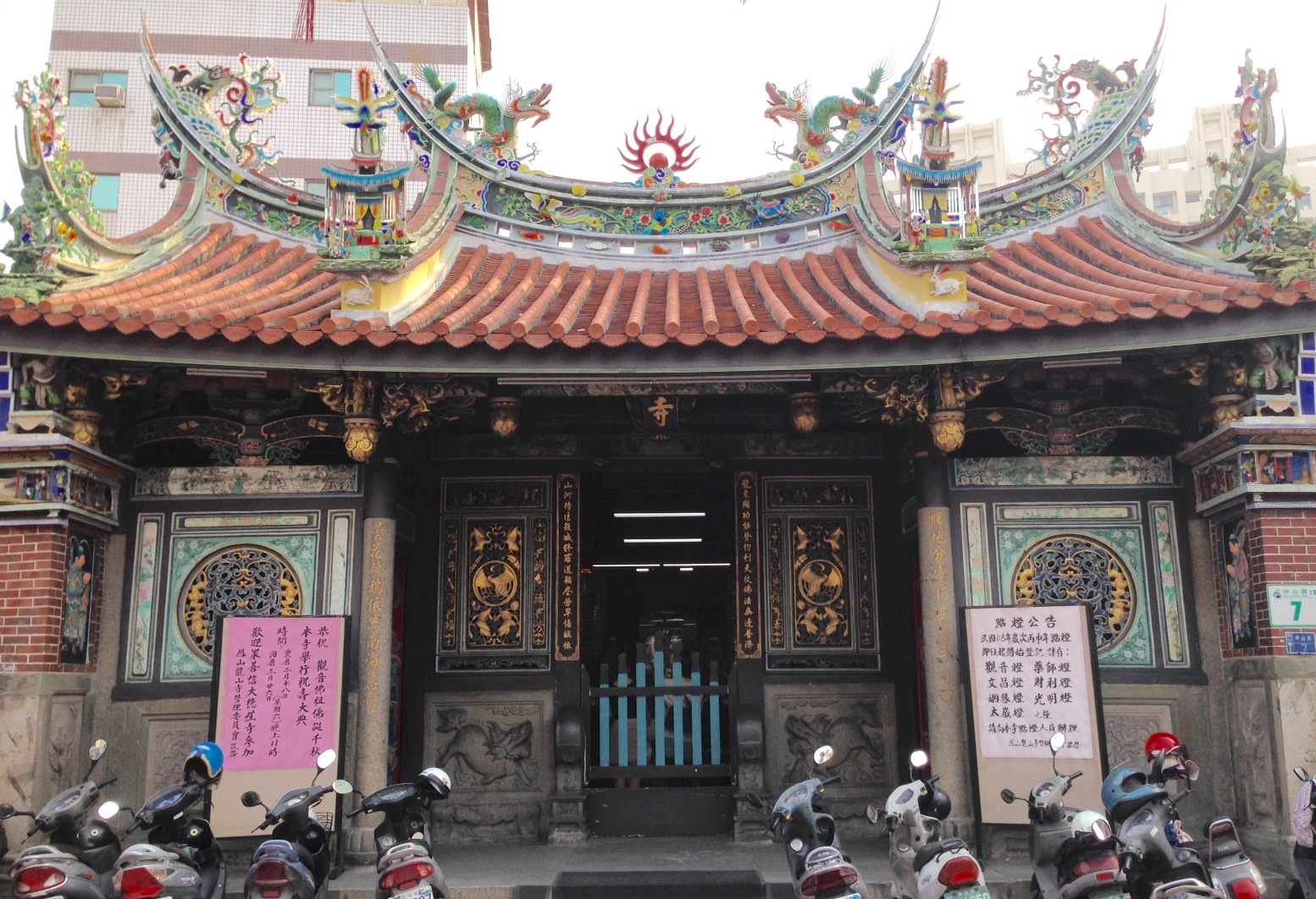

- Location within Kaohsiung

Religion
- Affiliation: Buddhism
- Sect: Mahayana
- Deity: Guanyin

Location
- Location: Fengshan, Kaohsiung, Taiwan
- Coordinates: 22°37′14.8″N 120°21′43.3″E

Architecture
- Type: Chinese temple

Website
- https://www.longshansi.org.tw/

The Fengshan Longshan Temple (traditional Chinese: 鳳山龍山寺; simplified Chinese: 凤山龙山寺; pinyin: Fèngshān Lóngshān Sì) is a Buddhist Temple in Fengshan District, Kaohsiung, Taiwan.

== History ==
The temple is predicted to be constructed in the early years of Qianlong Emperor of Qing Dynasty. It is the second oldest among Taiwan's five Longshan Temples. It has seen been renovated several times.

== Transportation ==
The temple is accessible within walking distance south of Dadong Station of Kaohsiung Metro.

== See also ==
- Fengshan Tiangong Temple
- Bangka Lungshan Temple, Taipei
- Lukang Longshan Temple, Changhua County
- List of temples in Taiwan
- List of tourist attractions in Taiwan
