= A Kung Ngam =

Village in Shau Kei Wan, Hong Kong

A Kung Ngam Chinese: 阿公岩
- Village
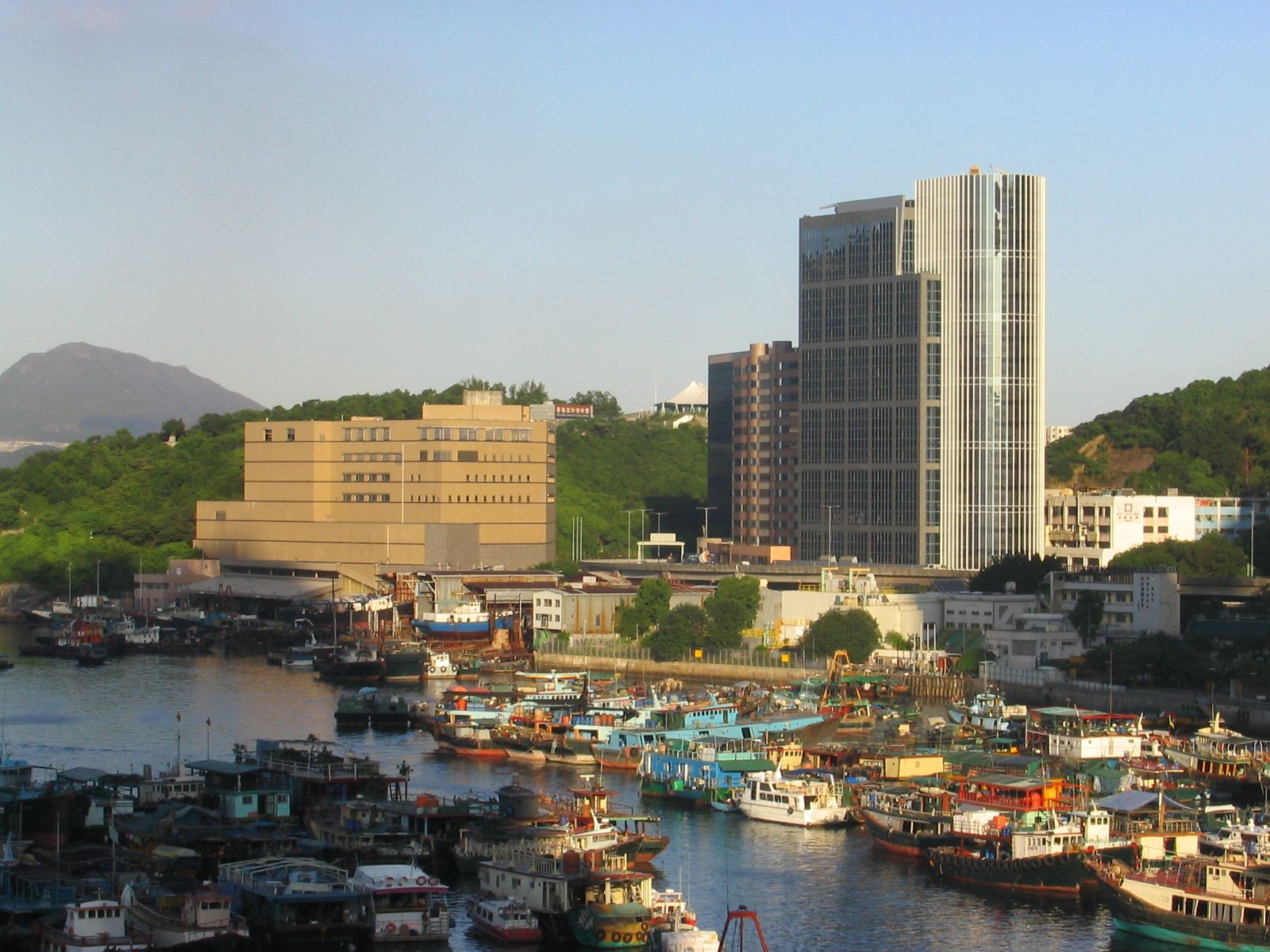
- A Kung Ngam and Shau Kei Wan Typhoon Shelter in August 2006

- Location within Hong Kong
- Coordinates: 22.28303°N 114.23142°E
- Country: People's Republic of China
- Special administrative region: Hong Kong
- Island: Hong Kong Island
- Neighbourhood: Shau Kei Wan
- Time zone: UTC+8:00 (HKT)

A Kung Ngam (Chinese: 阿公岩) is a village and an area in northeast Shau Kei Wan in the northeast of Hong Kong Island, in Hong Kong. It contains a fish terminal market, several temples and the Hong Kong Museum of Coastal Defence.

== Name ==
A Kung literally means maternal grandfather or old man in Cantonese while Ngam means rock, but in the case of this place name, "A Kung" refers to Tam Kung, a sea deity who the quarry workers believed in. A temple dedicated to Tam Kung is located in A Kung Ngam.

== History ==
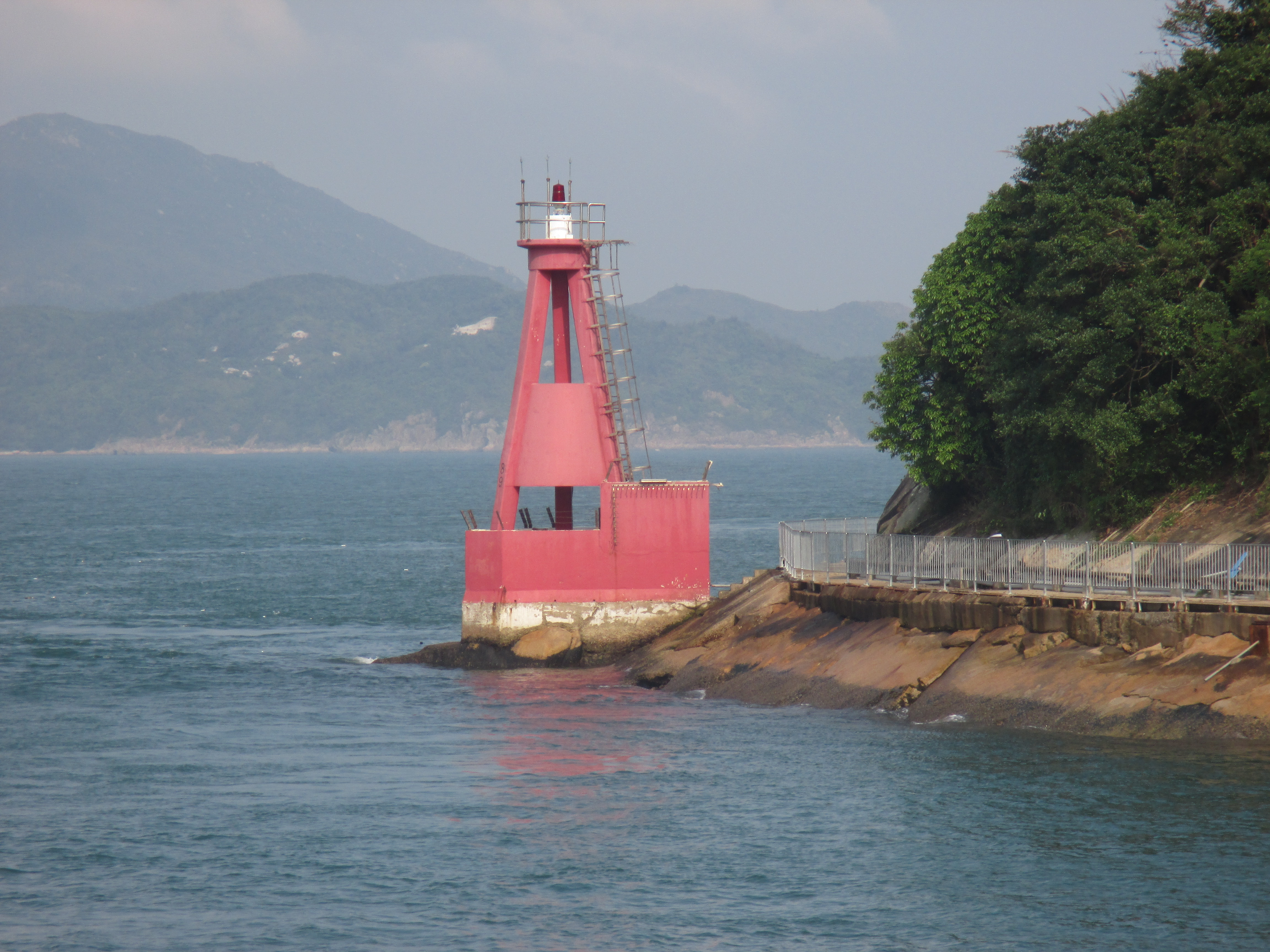
A Kung Ngam Lighthouse.

A Kung Ngam was a rock quarry in the 19th century, and the area was predominantly inhabited by quarry workers who immigrated from Huizhou and Chaozhou.

At the time of the 1911 census, the population of A Kung Ngam was 269. The number of males was 161.

A fire broke out in the early morning of 31 October 2005. Some ten houses in the village were burnt.

=== A Kung Ngam Shipyards ===
A Kung Ngam Shipyards (阿公岩船廠) was a port for export of stone materials in the mid 18th century. As there were so many ships, it became a typhoon shelter and shipyards were built. During the Dragon Boat Festivals, dragon boats races were held in Shau Kei Wan Typhoon Shelter, where dragon boats were once made by the shipyards. At the end of the 20th century, land reclamation from the sea caused fishing boats to anchor elsewhere. Nowadays, the number of shipyards has decreased due to a decrease in number of ships going there.

== Buildings ==
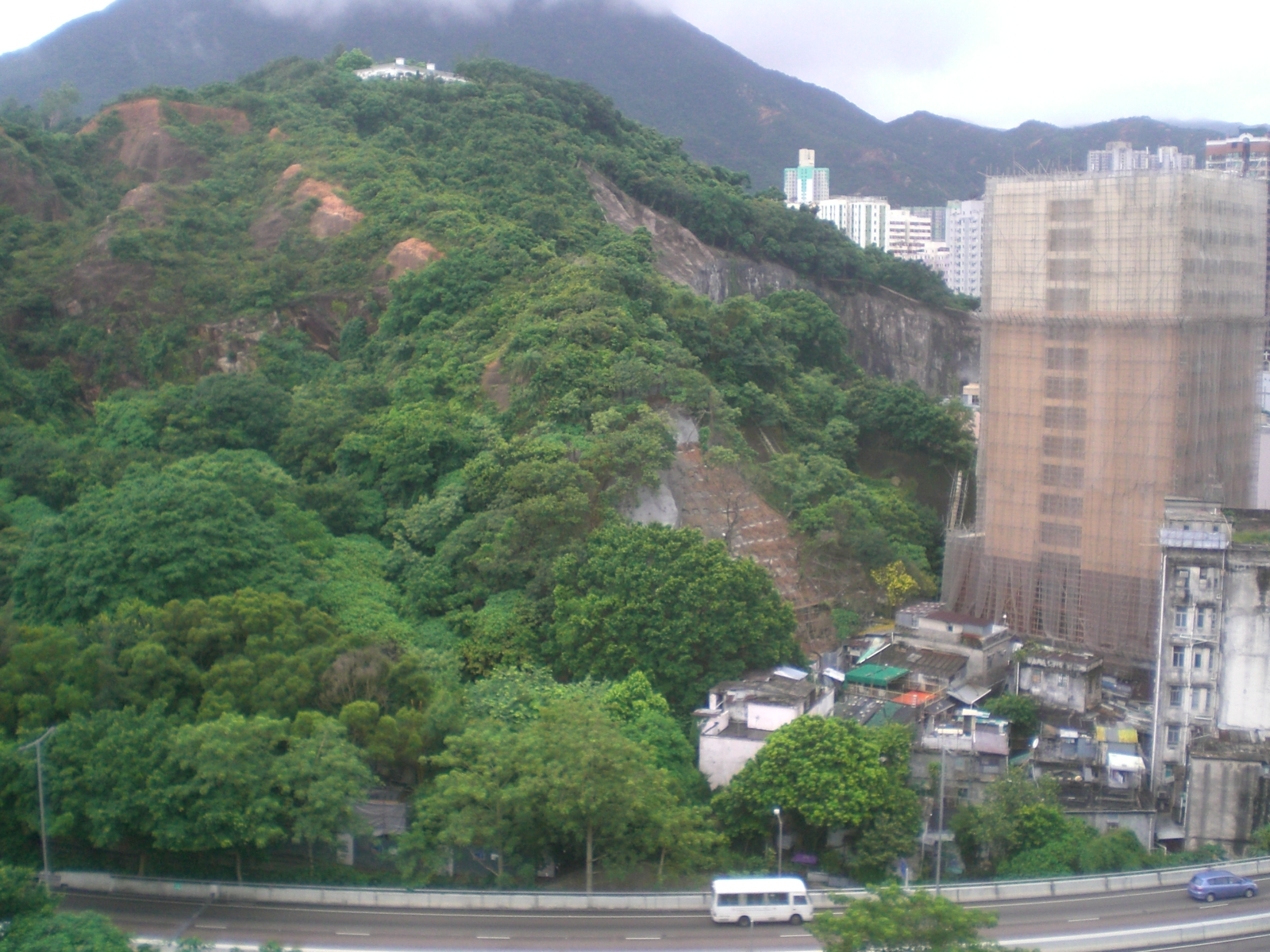
The mountain is named A Kung Ngam in Shau Kei Wan. The building visible at the top of the hill is Block 07 of the Old Lei Yue Mun Barracks, a declared monument of Hong Kong. Taken in August 2009.

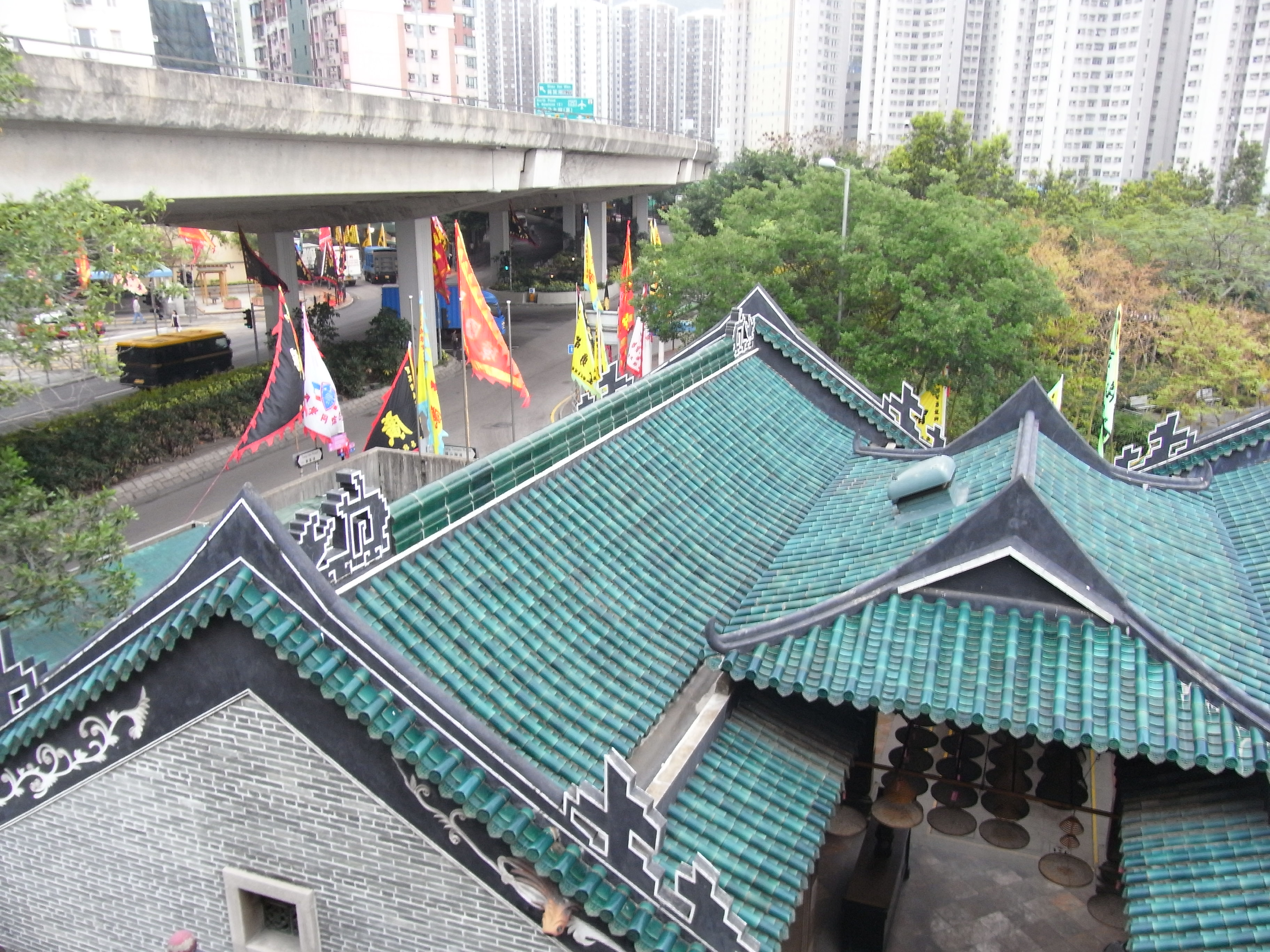
Tam Kung Temple in A Kung Ngam in April 2012.

Temples in A Kung Ngam include:

- Tam Kung Sin Shing Temple (譚公仙聖廟)
- Yuk Wong Temple
- Fook Tak Temple (福德祠)
- A Kung Ngam Lighthouse

== Education ==
A Kung Ngam is in Primary One Admission (POA) School Net 16. Within the school net are multiple aided schools (operated independently but funded with government money) and two government schools: Shau Kei Wan Government Primary School and Aldrich Bay Government Primary School.

== See also ==
- List of places in Hong Kong
