= Fengshan Tiangong Temple =

Temple in Fengshan, Kaohsiung, Taiwan

- 鳳山天公廟
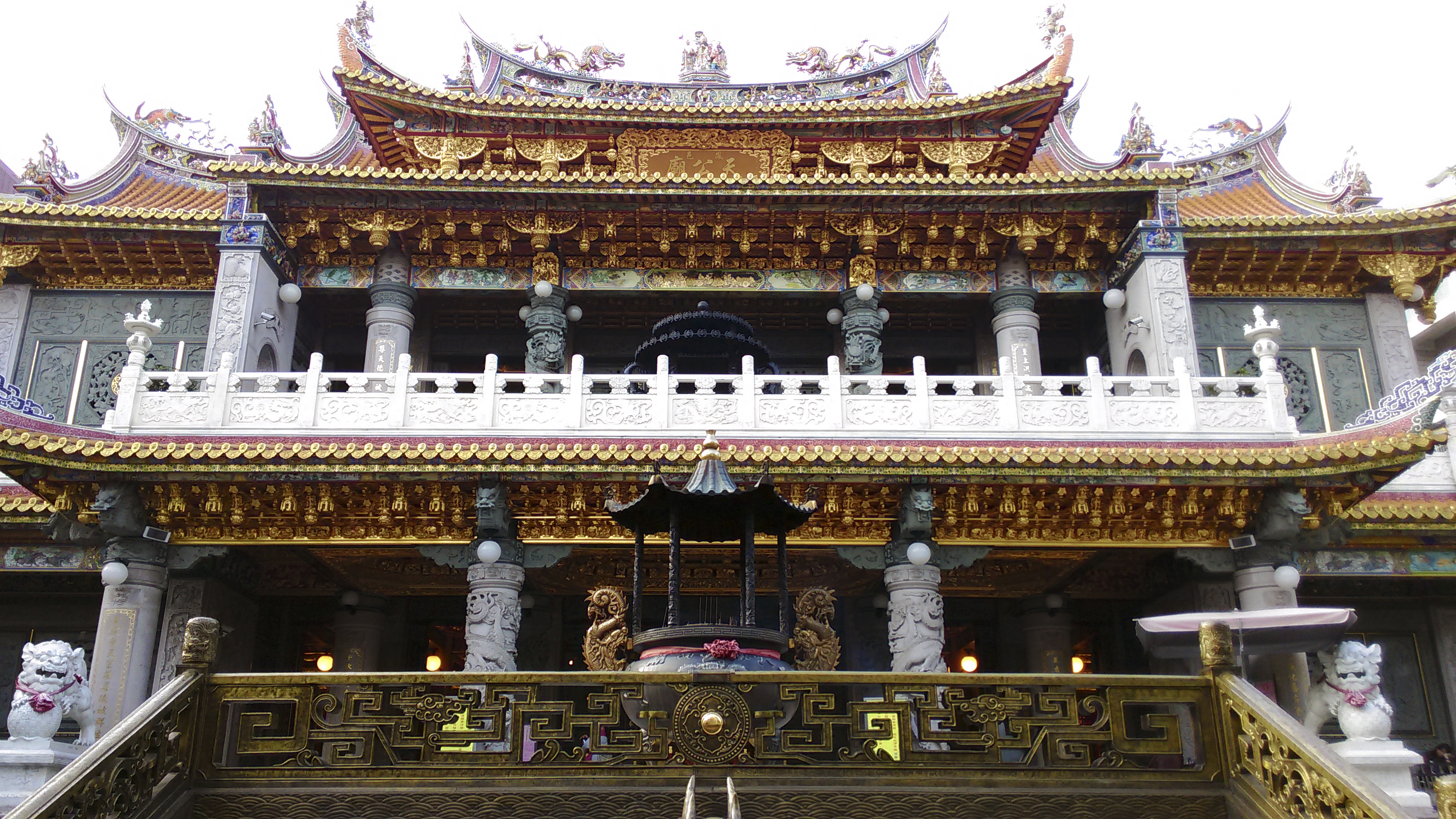

- Location within Kaohsiung

Location
- Location: Fengshan, Kaohsiung, Taiwan
- Interactive map of Fengshan Tiangong Temple
- Coordinates: 22°37′30.7″N 120°21′35.1″E

Architecture
- Type: temple
- Style: Southern Chinese
- Completed: 1798

The Fengshan Tiangong Temple (traditional Chinese: 鳳山天公廟; simplified Chinese: 凤山天公庙; pinyin: Fèngshān Tiāngōng Miào) is a temple in Fengshan District, Kaohsiung, Taiwan. This temple is dedicated to Jade Emperor.

== History ==
The temple was constructed in 1798.

== Architecture ==
The temple is a two-story building designed in the Southern Chinese architectural style.

== Transportation ==
The temple is accessible within walking distance southwest of Dadong Station of Kaohsiung Metro.

== See also ==
- Fengshan Longshan Temple
- Yuanching Temple, Changhua County
- List of temples in Taiwan
- List of tourist attractions in Taiwan
