= Thean Kong Thnuah Temple =

Malaysian landmark

- Malay: Tokong Thean Kong Thnuah; Chinese: 天公壇
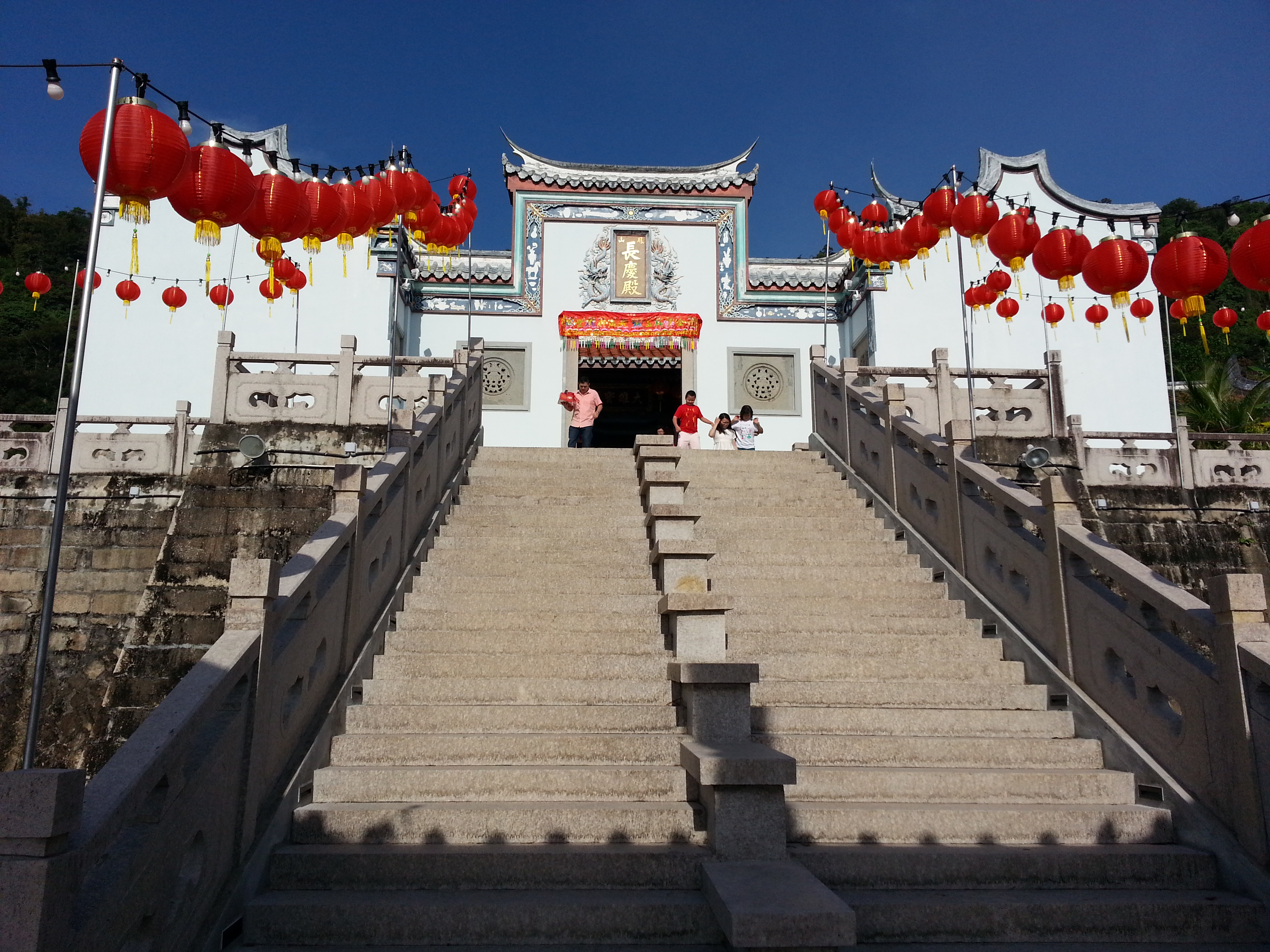

- Location within George Town

Religion
- Affiliation: Taoism
- Status: Active

Location
- Location: Lorong Pokok Celi, Ayer Itam
- Municipality: George Town
- State: Penang
- Country: Malaysia
- Interactive map of Thean Kong Thnuah Temple
- Coordinates: 5°24′35.442″N 100°16′36.665″E

Architecture
- Type: Taoist temple
- Completed: 1869

Thean Kong Thnuah Temple
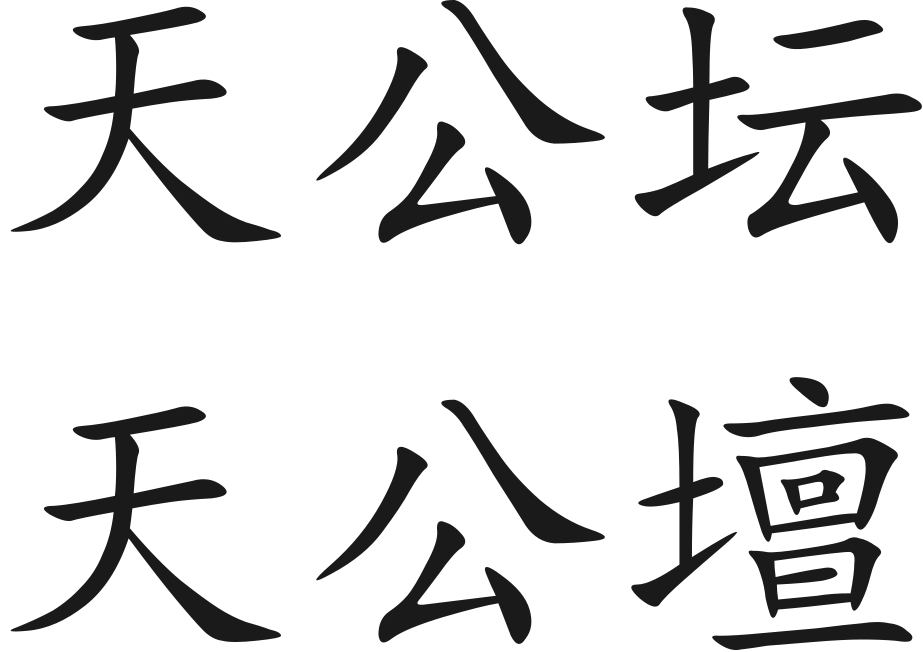
- Thean Kong Thnuah Temple in Simplified and Traditional Chinese characters
- Traditional Chinese: 天公壇
- Simplified Chinese: 天公坛
Transcriptions
Southern Min
- Hokkien POJ: Thian-kong tôaⁿ / Thiⁿ-kong tôaⁿ
- Tâi-lô: Thian-kong tuânn / Thinn-kong tuânn

The Thean Kong Thnuah Temple, also known as Thni Kong Tnua (Chinese: 天公壇) or the Jade Emperor's Pavilion, is a Taoist temple within George Town in the Malaysian state of Penang. Located at Ayer Itam, the temple was completed in 1869 and is the only temple in Malaysia built specifically for the worship of the Jade Emperor (Hokkien: Thinn-kong) It becomes a focal point for the annual Jade Emperor's Birthday celebrations on the 9th day of the Chinese New Year. The temple was also featured in Episode 8 of The Amazing Race 16.

== History ==
The temple was built in the 1860s by members of the ethnic Chinese Hokkien community in Malaysia and underwent a restoration beginning in 2002.

== Features ==
The temple is located at the foot of Penang Hill and is surrounded by lush greenery. The path leading up to the temple features a flight of stairs with 110 granite steps and its archway is decorated with century-old stone carvings. The temple's architecture is a combination of both Buddhist and Taoist styles. In the first shrine hall, there are three gold-plated Buddha statues while the Jade Emperor God sits in the main shrine hall.

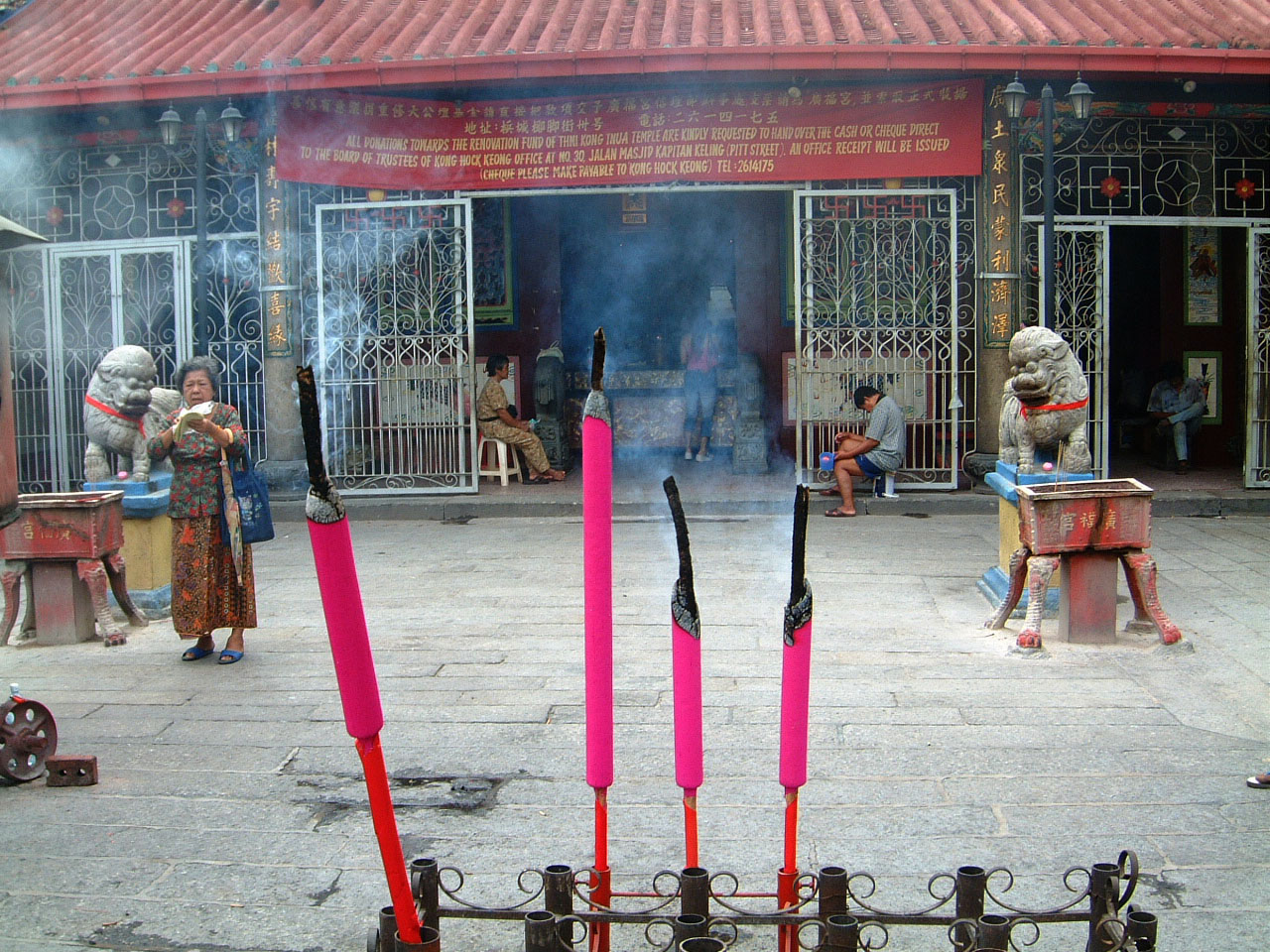
The temple compound.

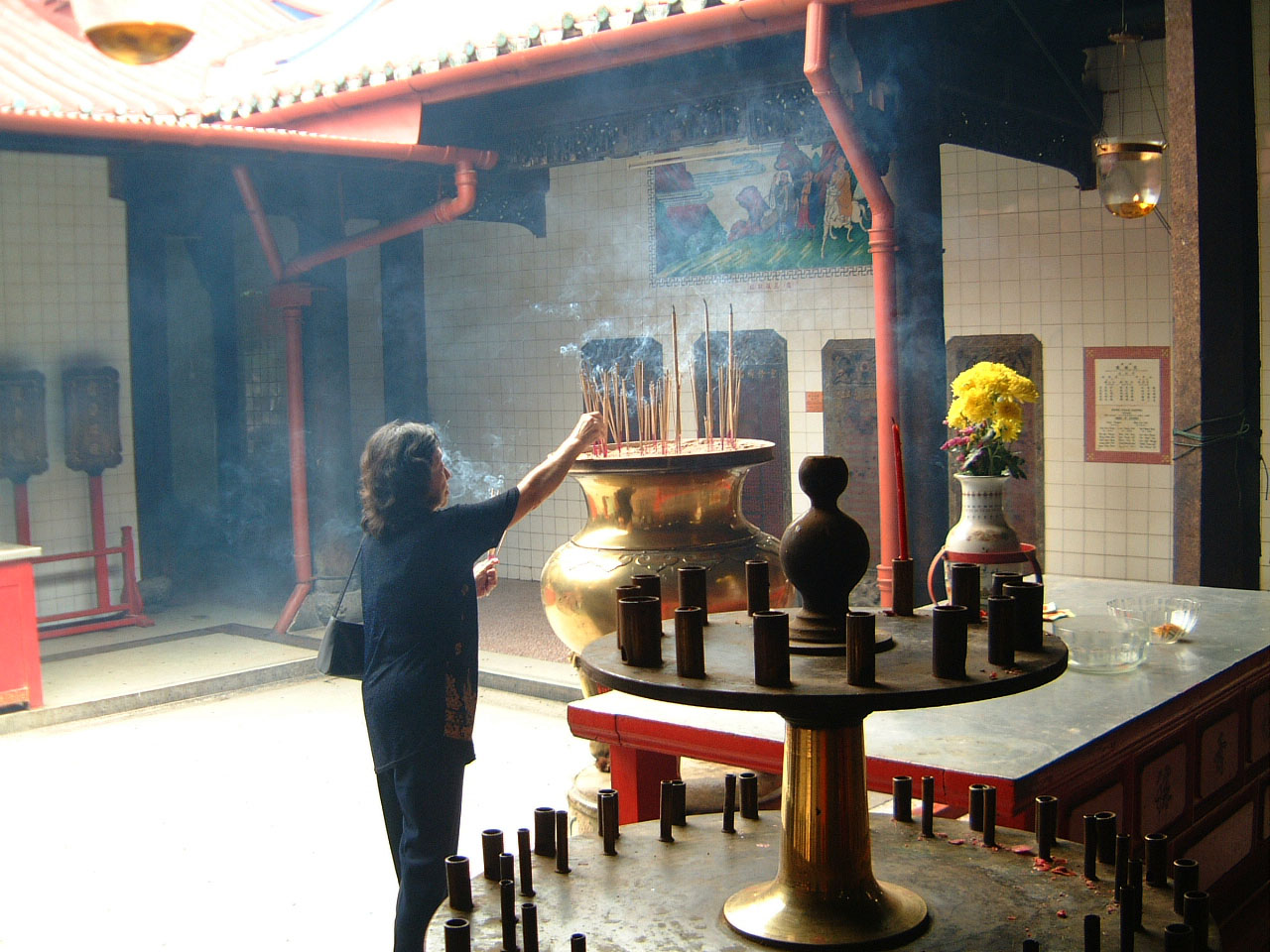
The temple interior view.
