= Ng Muk Kah =

Hong Kong dock worker (1917–2009)

Jenny Ng Muk Kah
- 吳木金
- Born: 1917; Causeway Bay, Hong Kong
- Died: February 19, 2009 (aged 91–92); Hong Kong
- Occupation: Dock worker
- Awards: British Empire Medal

Chinese name
- Chinese: 吳木金
Transcriptions
Standard Mandarin
- Hanyu Pinyin: Wu Mujin
Yue: Cantonese
- Jyutping: ng^{4} muk^{6} gam^{1}

Jenny Ng Muk Kah (Chinese: 吳木金; 1917 – 19 February 2009) was a Hong Kong dock worker who assisted the Royal Navy and other Commonwealth naval vessels at HMS Tamar in Admiralty, Hong Kong between 1928 and 1997. Over a career spanning nearly seventy years, she became one of the best-known civilian figures associated with the Royal Navy in Hong Kong and was awarded the British Empire Medal in 1980.

== Biography ==
=== Early life ===
Ng was a Hong Kong Tanka, born in 1917 on a sampan in Causeway Bay. Her mother, who had two daughters, was a second-generation leader of ship-washing female workers, and was responsible for helping the Royal Navy stationed at Hong Kong borrow sampans, providing sand and mud, and exchanging currency; she was known by naval personnel as "Jenny One". Ng never received any formal education. In 1928, when she was only 11 years old, she joined her mother's line of work along with her elder sister, washing ships at the HMS Tamar naval base in Admiralty. Like her mother, Ng took "Jenny" as her English name. She learned English through her daily work and gradually became well-known to the Royal Navy personnel stationed in Hong Kong. According to her memory, HMS Berwick was the first warship she served.

=== "Jenny's Side Party" ===
Traditionally, scraping rust from a warship's hull and repainting it was the duty of sailors, who needed to erect temporary staging from the shore or approach the hull from rafts and other small boats. These tasks took a long time, and the rust and paint were highly likely to fall onto the sailors' uniforms, making it a thankless and arduous job. In Hong Kong, however, these tasks were handled entirely by female workers. During the peak period from the 1930s to the 1950s, up to 70 women were engaged in this work. Whenever a stationed or visiting warship berthed, they would approach the ship in teams via sampans, using long-handled brushes or paint rollers to refurbish the hull, often working an average of 10 hours a day.

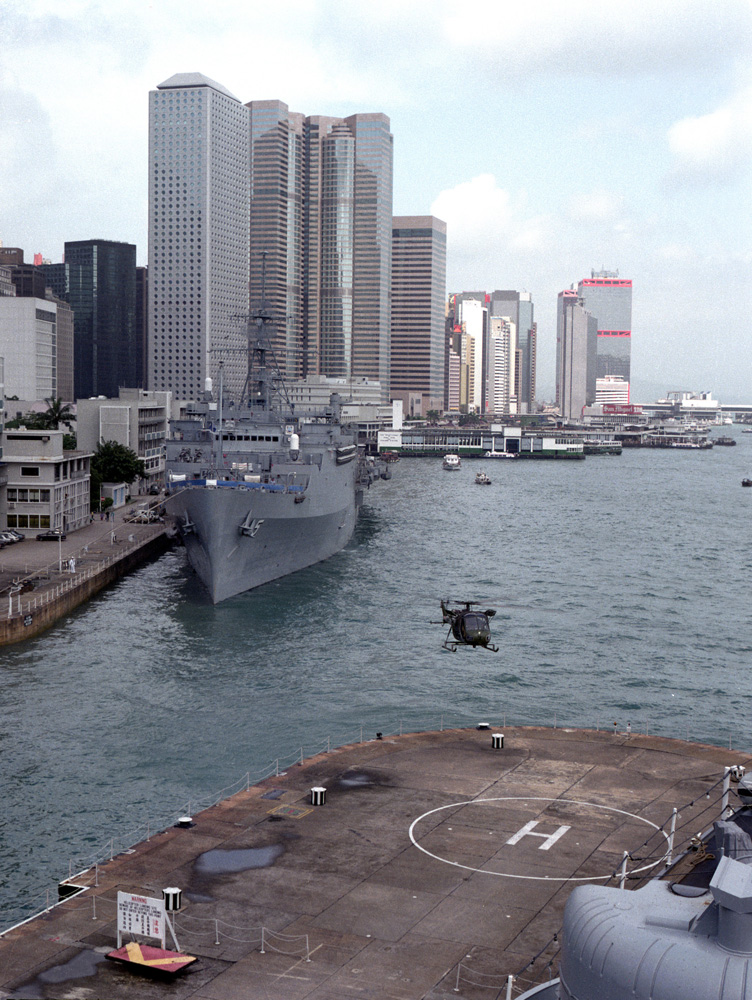
HMS Tamar naval base before 1997

By the age of 13, Ng had already become a leader of the female workers, leading her team at the naval base to clean docked Royal Navy ships and other Commonwealth naval vessels, including the Royal Australian Navy. Within the stationed naval community, they earned the nickname "Jenny's side party". After World War II, in addition to them, there was the "Mary Soo side party" on the north shore of Hong Kong Island specializing in serving visiting United States Navy warships, and the "Suzie's side party" serving ships of local Royal Navy personnel. The Jenny and Suzie side parties would sometimes quarrel over "competing" for ships.

In addition to cleaning hulls, scraping rust, and repainting, Ng and her workers were also responsible for polishing the ships' brass parts, doing laundry and ironing for the sailors, clearing trash, and providing other ship management services. She would also specially buy newspapers and fruit daily for senior officers on board, and place fresh flowers in their living quarters. Whenever a cocktail party was held on board, they would serve as waitresses. Furthermore, Ng often assisted sailors in mailing letters and packages, and liked to gift them symbolic souvenirs like jade; whenever a sailor was unable to leave port with the ship due to illness, she would arrange care for them. Notably, Jenny's side party never charged a penny. Their sole source of income came from selling soft drinks to the ship's crew, and recycling and selling discarded cables, ropes, food, and even general waste and other miscellaneous scrap collected from the vessels.

During its heyday, Jenny's side party consisted of up to around 36 women. They all wore traditional Chinese blouses (da jin shan), traditional silk trousers, and conical hats, with their hair tied up, which became the iconic image of ship-washing female workers at the time. Although many stationed and visiting sailors who interacted with Ng did not know her real name, they all felt she was amiable and generous, leaving a deep impression with her ever-smiling face and the few gold teeth in her mouth. Ng's long-term service at HMS Tamar made the names of Jenny and Jenny's side party almost universally known among several generations of stationed Royal Navy personnel and visiting Commonwealth naval forces. Many sailors took commemorative photos with Jenny and her workers, treating her as an honored guest. Some sailors who became close friends with her later rose to become top naval commanders.

Ng served the Royal Navy from 1928 until the handover of Hong Kong in 1997, spanning nearly 70 years and hosting hundreds of warships. Over the years, she received commendation letters from various ship commanders, one of which was personally delivered by the Prince Consort, Prince Philip, during his 1959 visit to Hong Kong aboard the royal yacht HMY Britannia. In fact, Ng had known Prince Philip since 1945, when he was just a naval lieutenant and not yet married. Although Ng was never an official member of the Royal Navy establishment, she was awarded an unofficial ("high replica") Long Service and Good Conduct Medal by the captain of HMS Dorsetshire in 1938. Later, bars were added in 1969 and 1975 by the crews of HMS Berry Head and HMS Leander respectively. In the 1980 Queen's Birthday Honours she was awarded the British Empire Medal (BEM) and was personally invested by the then Governor of Hong Kong, Sir Murray MacLehose, at Government House in October of the same year. The official citation from the British Crown praised her, stating: "The standard of Miss Ng's work is exceptionally high and one of which she can be justly proud. Personnel who have served in the Royal or Commonwealth Navies have been deeply impressed by Jenny." In 1983, the Royal Navy named a ferry after her, the Jenny.

However, Ng's close relationship with the Royal Navy led to a relatively difficult life during the three years and eight months of the Japanese occupation of Hong Kong from 1941 to 1945. During this time, the sharp decline in visiting ships meant her work and income were far worse than before. Furthermore, she had to secretly hide all the commendation letters given by the Royal Navy in the double bottom of her sampan, and concealed the Long Service and Good Conduct Medal inside the heel of her shoe to avoid discovery by the Japanese military. After the liberation, she carefully kept the commendation letters received over the years in two thick photo albums, and stored numerous group photos with naval personnel in various large envelopes, showing great treasure for these records.

=== Later life ===
Entering the 1980s, with the decrease in the number of visiting ships, the workload of Jenny's side party was not as frequent as before, but Ng still provided services to the Royal Navy. In 1994, the dockyard at the HMS Tamar naval base officially closed to make way for land reclamation; however, until the final days of British rule in June 1997, her figure could still be seen at Tamar. As an iconic figure of the naval base, Ng was received by Prince Philip and Prince Charles in the 1980s and 1990s, and attended military commemoration ceremonies such as Liberation Day held at The Cenotaph as an honored guest.

Following the establishment of the Hong Kong Special Administrative Region on 1 July 1997, Ng officially retired as the Royal Navy withdrew from Hong Kong. In her later years, she was cared for by a niece, and was reportedly saddened by losing touch with many of her former naval friends. On 19 February 2009, she passed away in Hong Kong at the age of 92. Newspapers, such as Hong Kong's South China Morning Post and the UK's The Times and The Daily Telegraph, published dedicated obituaries reviewing her life in tribute.

== Personal life ==
Relatively little is known about Ng's private life. According to contemporary reports, she was married and had two daughters. Both daughters attended university in the United Kingdom and later settled in the United States.

== Honours ==
=== Decorations ===
- Replica of the Naval Long Service and Good Conduct Medal (presented by the commanding officer of HMS Dorsetshire in 1938)
- Replica clasp to the Naval Long Service and Good Conduct Medal (presented by the crew of HMS Berry Head in 1969)
- Replica clasp to the Naval Long Service and Good Conduct Medal (presented by the crew of HMS Leander in 1975)
- British Empire Medal (BEM), awarded in the 1980 Birthday Honours

=== Namesakes ===
- Jenny a Royal Navy ferry named in her honour in 1983.

== See also ==
- Royal Navy
- HMS Tamar
- China Fleet Club
- Tanka people
