= Remembrance Day (Hong Kong) =

Anniversary celebrated in Hong Kong

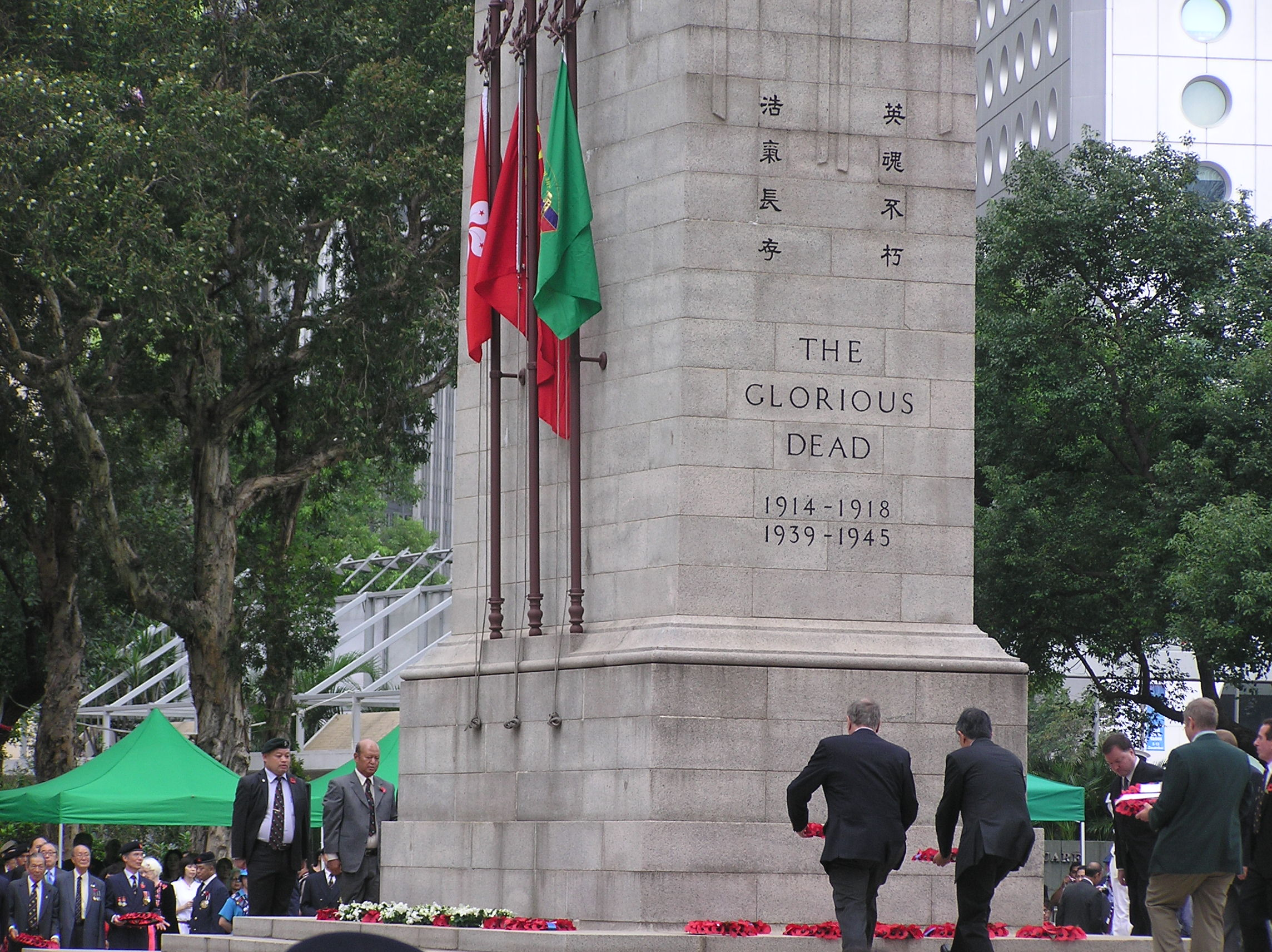
- The giving of flowers in memory of lives lost at The Cenotaph
- Official name: 和平紀念日
- Observed by: Hong Kong
- Type: Historical
- Significance: Memorial of lives lost in World War I, World War II, and the Battle of Hong Kong.
- Observances: Flower giving, mourning
- Date: Second Sunday in November
- 2024 date: November 10
- 2025 date: November 9
- 2026 date: November 8
- 2027 date: November 14
- Frequency: Annual
- Related to: Remembrance Day, Liberation Day

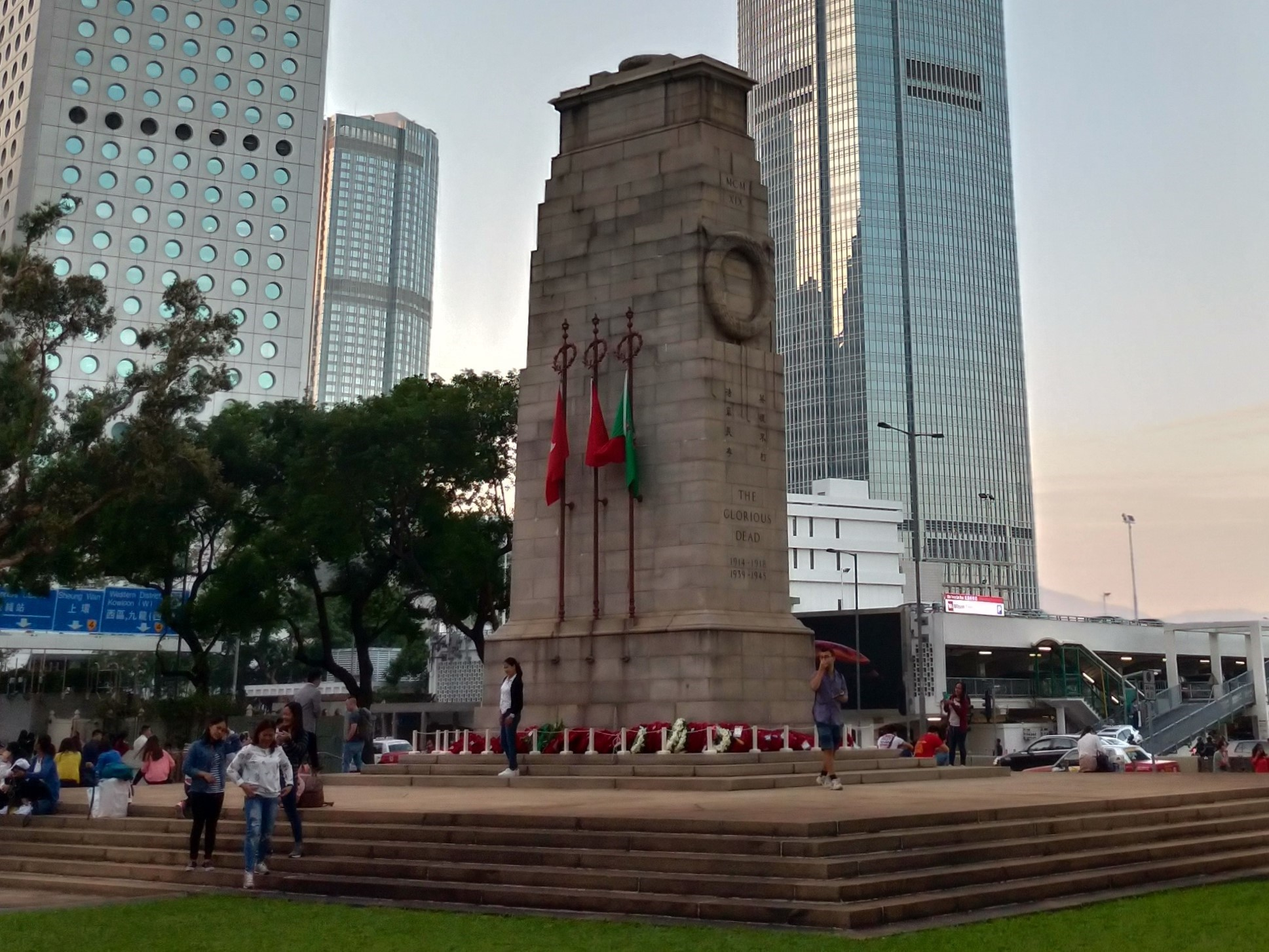
The Cenotaph, located in Statue Square, Central opens on Remembrance Day

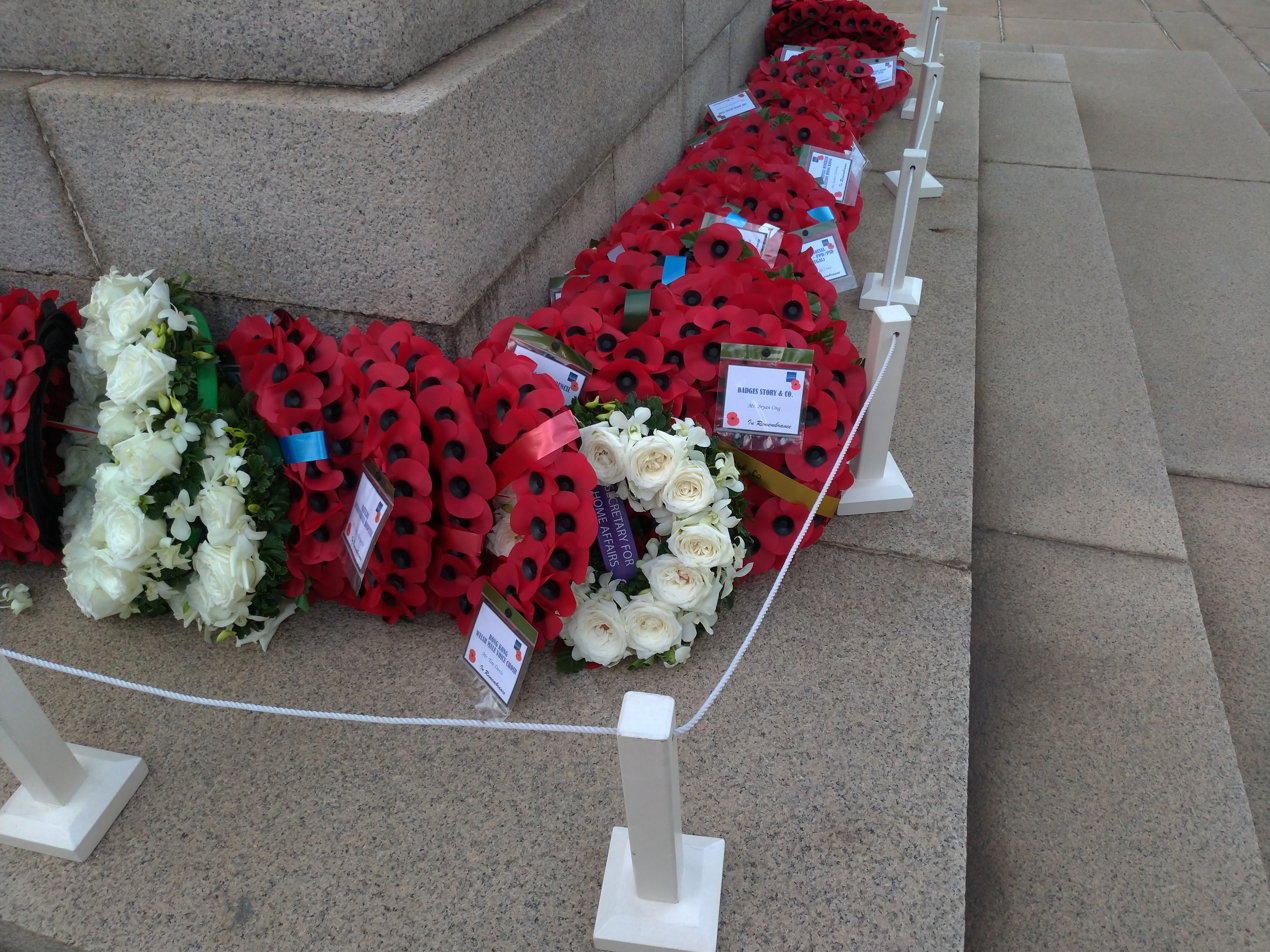
Red poppy wreaths placed around The Cenotaph

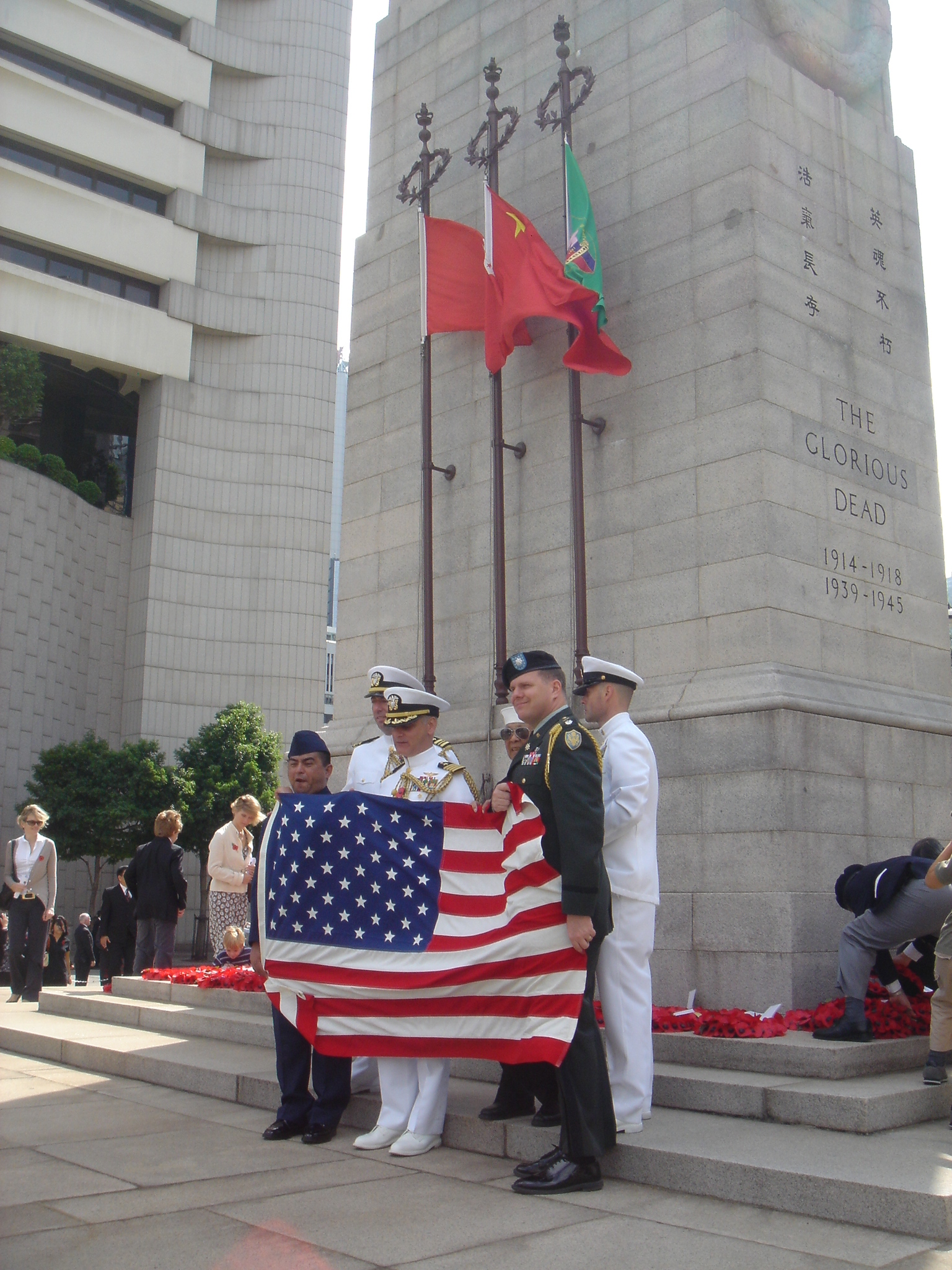
US military representatives attending the Remembrance Day ceremony

Remembrance Day (Chinese: 和平紀念日; Cantonese Yale: wòh pìhng géi nihm yaht; lit. 'Peace remembering day') is an anniversary in Hong Kong initially celebrating the end of World War I, and was later expanded to commemorate the lives lost in the Battle of Hong Kong and World War II. The anniversary was initially celebrated annually on November 10, and is now celebrated on the second Sunday of November. On Remembrance Day, memorial ceremonies take place at the Cenotaph in Central.

== History ==
On November 11, 1918, the German Empire signed the Armistice and surrendered to the Allies, marking the end of World War I. Since 1918, the British Hong Kong government declared November 11 as the annual Remembrance Day. Every year, the Governor of Hong Kong, government officials and Legislative Council members attend the memorial event at Statue Square in Central. The Cenotaph, which is located on the square, was constructed in 1923.

On August 15, 1945, World War II ended. Compared to the mostly European World War I, Hong Kong was devastated in the Battle of Hong Kong and suffered severe casualties. This led to a change in Remembrance Day, which was changed to the second Sunday of November every year. The Hong Kong government declared August 30 as Liberation Day, a public holiday, to celebrate the end of Japanese occupation. The celebration of the end of World War I was celebrated on Remembrance Day, while the celebration of World War II was celebrated on Liberation Day. Both anniversaries were celebrated in Statue Square.

The memorial ceremonies of Remembrance Day were originally celebrated in three locations: the Hong Kong Zoo, Statue Square, and St. John's Cathedral. Since 1981, the ceremonies were combined and celebrated at Statue Square, where the Cenotaph was located. Originally, only 1914-1918 was engraved on the Cenotaph as the duration of World War I. After Hong Kong was liberated in 1945, 1939-1945 was engraved below the original engraving as the duration of World War II. In the 1980s, the Chinese characters 英魂不朽 浩氣長存 were engraved on the sides to match the original English text "The Glorious Dead". This was done to show respect to the soldiers who died in the wars and in memory of soldiers who sacrificed themselves to protect Hong Kong.

=== Post handover ===
After the Hong Kong sovereignty transfer in 1997, Liberation Day was once replaced by Victory over Japan Day, which was also celebrated on August 30. On September 9, 1998, the Legislative Council passed the Revised Holiday Draft of 1998, which canceled Victory over Japan Day (Liberation Day before July 1, 1997). The holiday was replaced by Buddha's Birthday and the ceremonies in memory of the end of World War II were combined and celebrated with Remembrance Day. Nowadays, Remembrance Day is celebrated annually on the second Sunday of November, and the mourning ceremonies are mainly carried out by Hong Kong Military Veterans.

== See also ==
- Poppies: flowers symbolizing Remembrance Day
- Liberation Day: anniversary of the end of Japanese occupation of Hong Kong
- Remembrance Day: anniversary celebrated on November 11 in the UK, North America, and Commonwealth Nations celebrating the end of World War I
- Hong Kong during World War I
