= Operation Armour =

British military operation in Hong Kong

Operation Armour was a British operation launched by the South East Asia Command (SEAC) in August and September 1945 for the British reoccupation of Hong Kong. It aimed to resupply Hong Kong with fresh troops, food and supplies.

The British was made aware of Hong Kong's worsening food situation as early as mid-1942, with intelligence provided by the British Army Aid Group in Hong Kong, which allowed the British to plan for the operation. Just after the Japanese surrender, Hong Kong held around 4,000 tons of rice, which was only enough to feed the population for several weeks. Nationalist Chinese forces had retaken the neighbouring city of Guangzhou, but prohibited the exportation of food to Hong Kong as they were dealing with a food shortage of their own. The operation was formally drawn up on August 21, 1945.

On August 31, a convoy consisting of HMS Glengyle and Smiter (carrying No. 132 Squadron RAF), HMIS Llanstephan Castle (carrying 3 Commando Brigade) and HMCS Ontario departed Trincomalee and headed for Hong Kong as part of the operation. On September 12, the first rice convoy, City of Worcester, departed Rangoon carrying 6,300 tons of rice. The ship arrived in Hong Kong on September 26. Conditions in the colony worsened in November because of a shortage of ships in southeast Asia. On Admiral Cecil Harcourt's request, the SEAC diverted four rice convoys to Hong Kong. By December, the colony received 4,000 tons of coal, 18,000 tons of rice from Burma, Thailand and Vietnam, and flour, milk, sugar, canned beef, peanuts, coconut oil and biscuits from Australia and India.

A reconstruction force known as the "Shield Force", composed of 3,400 men and officers from various RAF units, including No. 5358 Airfield Construction Wing of the Airfield Construction Branch RAF, was diverted from its original course towards Okinawa to Hong Kong. They arrived on September 4 to assist with restoring public services.

== See also ==
- Liberation of Hong Kong
