= The Cenotaph, Hong Kong =

Coordinates: 22°16′53.57″N 114°09′38.24″E

The Cenotaph
- 和平紀念碑 (Chinese)
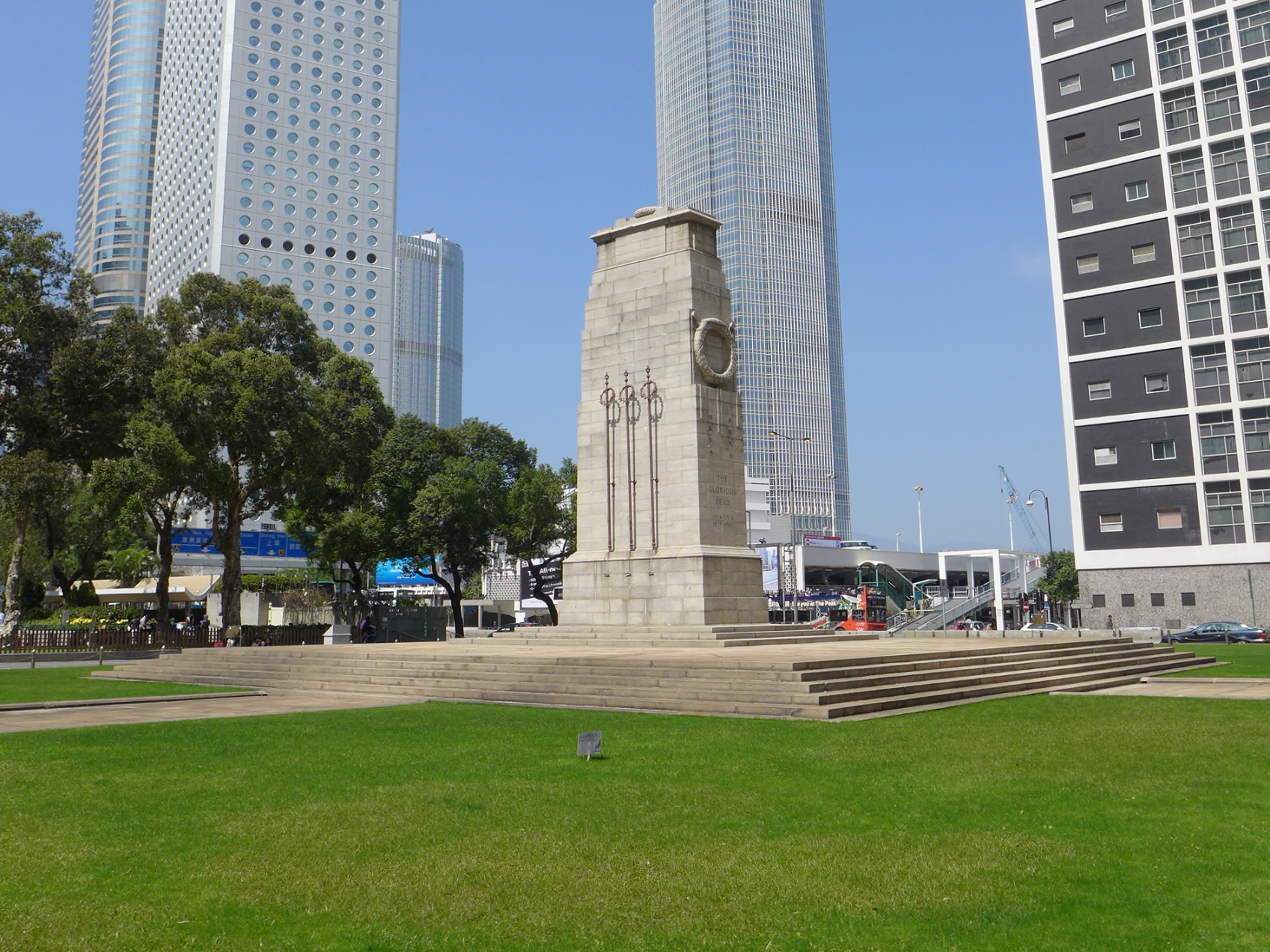
- The Cenotaph in February 2014
- Interactive map of The Cenotaph
- Location: Statue Square

History
- Built: 1923; 103 years ago

Declared Monument of Hong Kong
- Designated: 22 November 2013; 12 years ago
- Reference no.: 102

The Cenotaph
- Traditional Chinese: 和平紀念碑
- Simplified Chinese: 和平纪念碑
- Literal meaning: Peace Memorial
Transcriptions
Standard Mandarin
- Hanyu Pinyin: Hépíng Jìniànbēi
Yue: Cantonese
- Yale Romanization: Wòhpìhng gèinihmbēi
- Jyutping: Wo4 ping4 gei2 nim6 bei1
- IPA: [wɔ̏ːpʰȉːŋ kêinìmpéi]

The Cenotaph is a war memorial constructed in 1923 and located between Statue Square and the City Hall in Central, Hong Kong, that commemorates the dead in the two world wars who served in Hong Kong in the Royal Navy, British Army and Royal Air Force. Built in stone, it is an almost exact replica of the Cenotaph on Whitehall in London, UK (designed by Sir Edwin Lutyens and unveiled in 1920). It is listed as a monument under the Antiquities and Monuments Ordinance.

== History ==
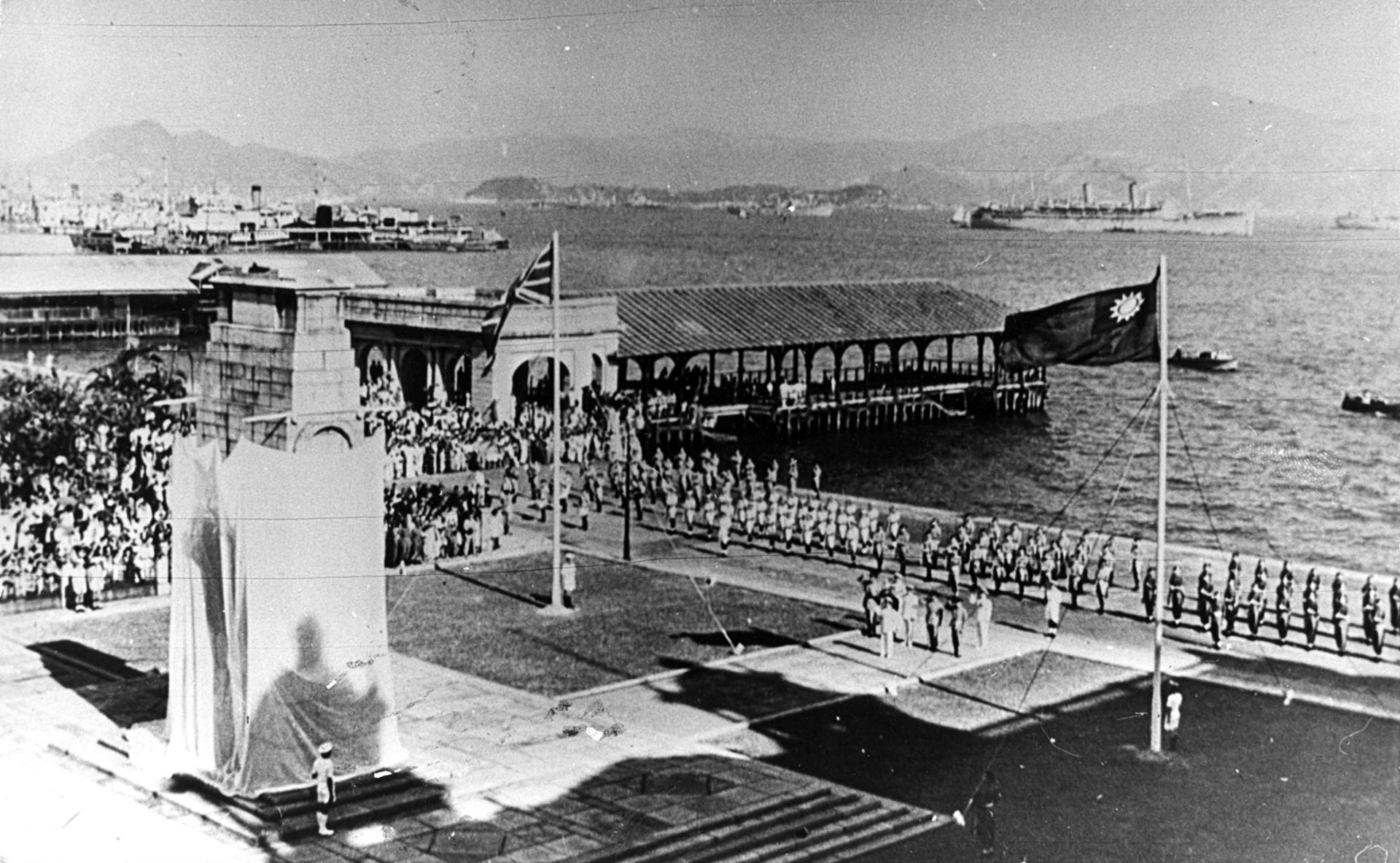
1945 liberation of Hong Kong at the Cenotaph. Queen's Pier is visible in the background.

The Cenotaph was unveiled on 24 May 1923 (Empire Day) by the then Governor Sir Reginald Edward Stubbs. At that time, the location was still on the waterfront. Initially built to commemorate the dead of the First World War, inscribed with the words "The Glorious Dead", the dates 1939–1945 were added later to honour victims of the Second World War, and the phrase "May their martyred souls be immortal, and their noble spirits endure" (Chinese: 英魂不朽 浩氣長存) were added in the 1970s to commemorate those who lost their lives during the Japanese invasion.

On 22 November 2013, The Cenotaph was gazetted as a monument under the Antiquities and Monuments Ordinance.

== Commemorations ==
=== Liberation Day ===
During British rule, after 1945, Liberation Day commemoration took place here on the last Monday in August to commemorate the Liberation of Hong Kong from Japanese occupation in 1945. No official ceremonies have taken place here since 1997. Unofficial delegations do mark events here, and the flag poles are occasionally dressed.

Hong Kong's invasion was part of the Pacific Campaign of World War II, which was a separate development from the events happening in mainland China. Hong Kong was defended by the Hong Kong's Garrison formed by soldiers drawn from Commonwealth nations (See Battle of Hong Kong).

=== Remembrance Day ===
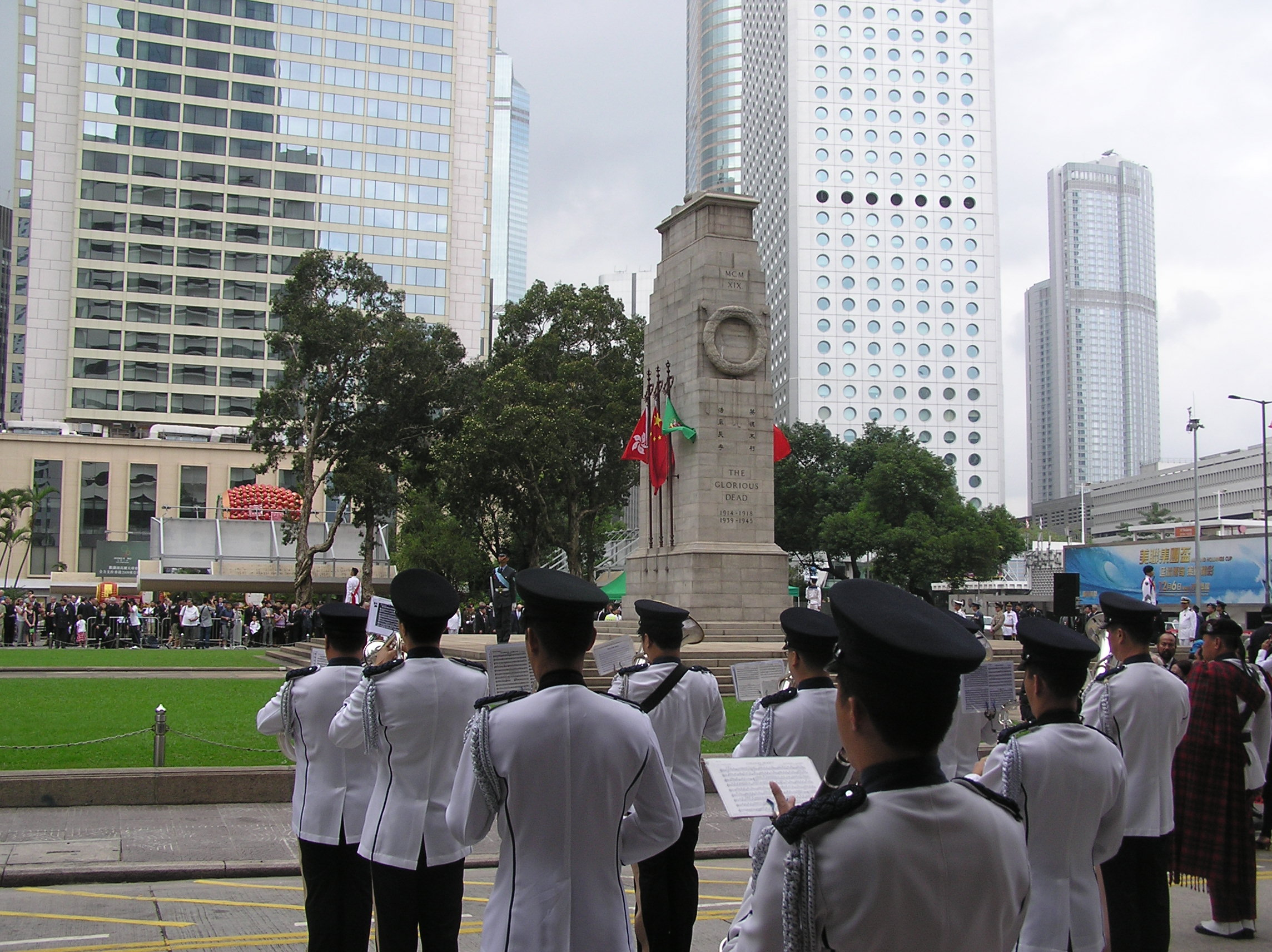
The Hong Kong Police Band at the memorial service by the Cenotaph on Remembrance Sunday in November 2009

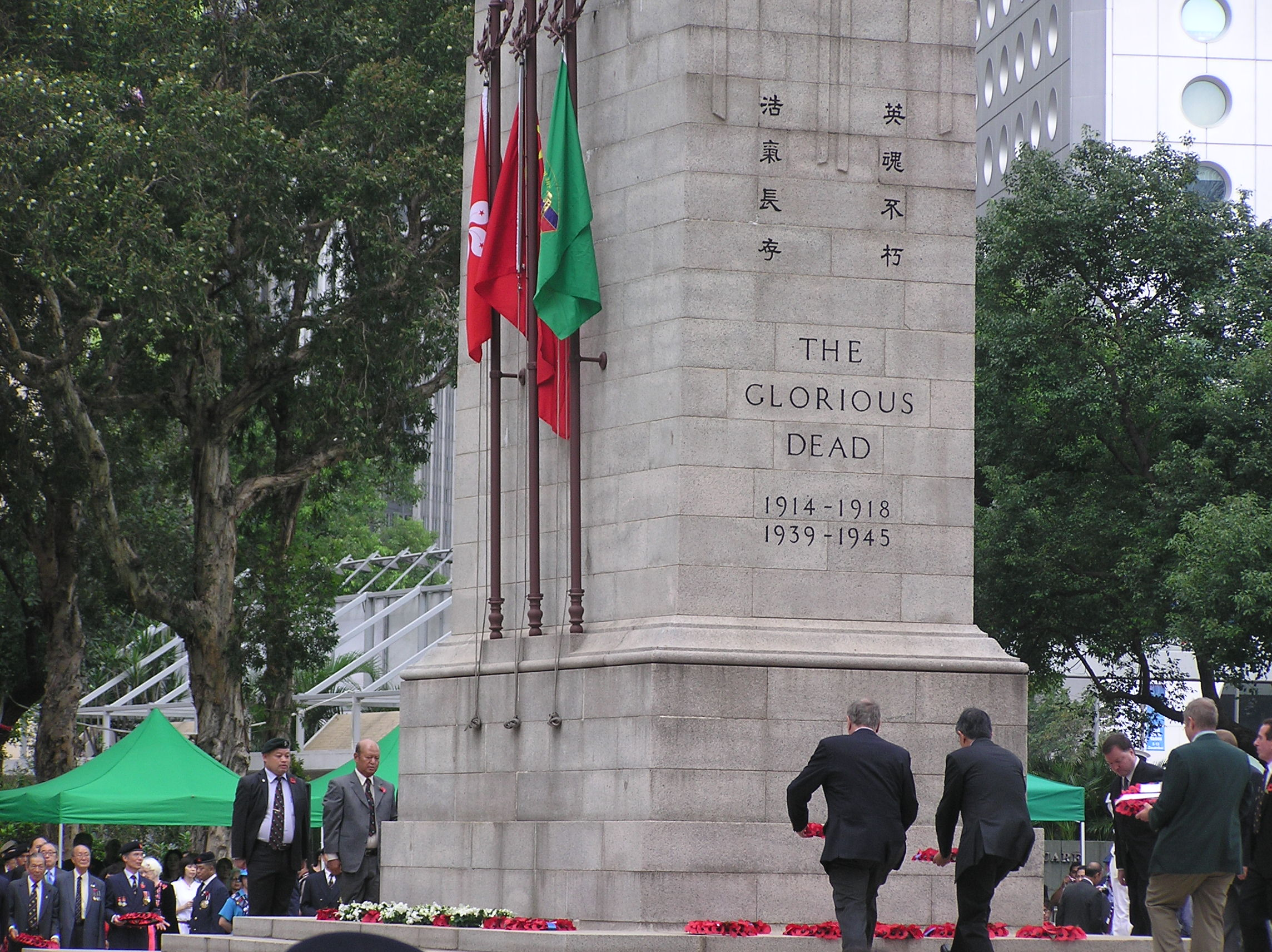
Ex-servicemen and Government representatives laying wreaths in front of the Cenotaph on Remembrance Sunday in November 2009

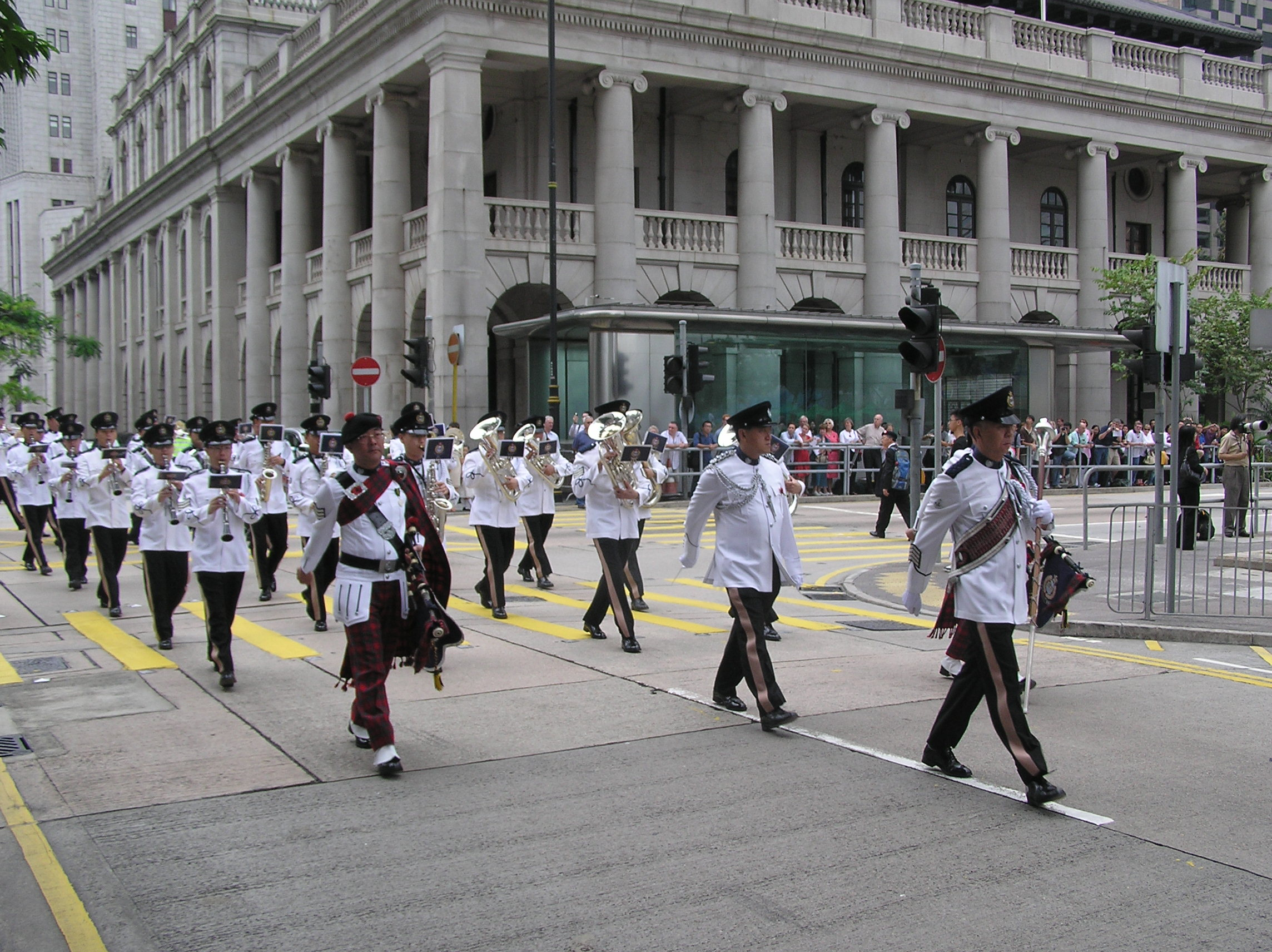
The Hong Kong Police Band marching towards the Cenotaph for the Remembrance Sunday service in November 2009.

The Remembrance Sunday observance in Hong Kong is marked by a multi-faith memorial service at the Cenotaph. The service is organised by the Royal British Legion (HK & China Branch) and the Hong Kong Ex-Servicemen's Association and is attended by various Government officials, as well as representatives of various religions including the Anglican Church, the Roman Catholic Church, the Eastern Orthodox Church, the Buddhist community, the Taoist community, the Muslim community and the Sikh community. Although Hong Kong ceased to be part of the Commonwealth of Nations in 1997, the memorial service still resembles those in many other Commonwealth countries. The service includes the sounding of "Last Post," two minutes of silence, the sounding of "Reveille", the laying of wreaths, prayers, and ends with a recitation of the "Ode of Remembrance". The Hong Kong Police Force Pipe Band continues to perform their ceremonial duty at the service.

=== ANZAC Day ===
There are commemorative events in front of the Cenotaph every year on Anzac Day. The events are held at dawn and are attended by the Consuls-General (or the High Commissioners before 1997) of Australia and New Zealand.

== Flags ==
Prior to 1997, flags were flown on the Cenotaph daily, in exactly the same order as on its Whitehall counterpart. Since 1997 no flags are flown except during ceremonies: on Remembrance Day the flags of Hong Kong, the People's Republic of China and Hong Kong Ex-Servicemen's Association are present.

== See also ==
- Central and Western Heritage Trail
- World War I memorials
