= Liberation Day (Hong Kong) =

Former public holiday in Hong Kong

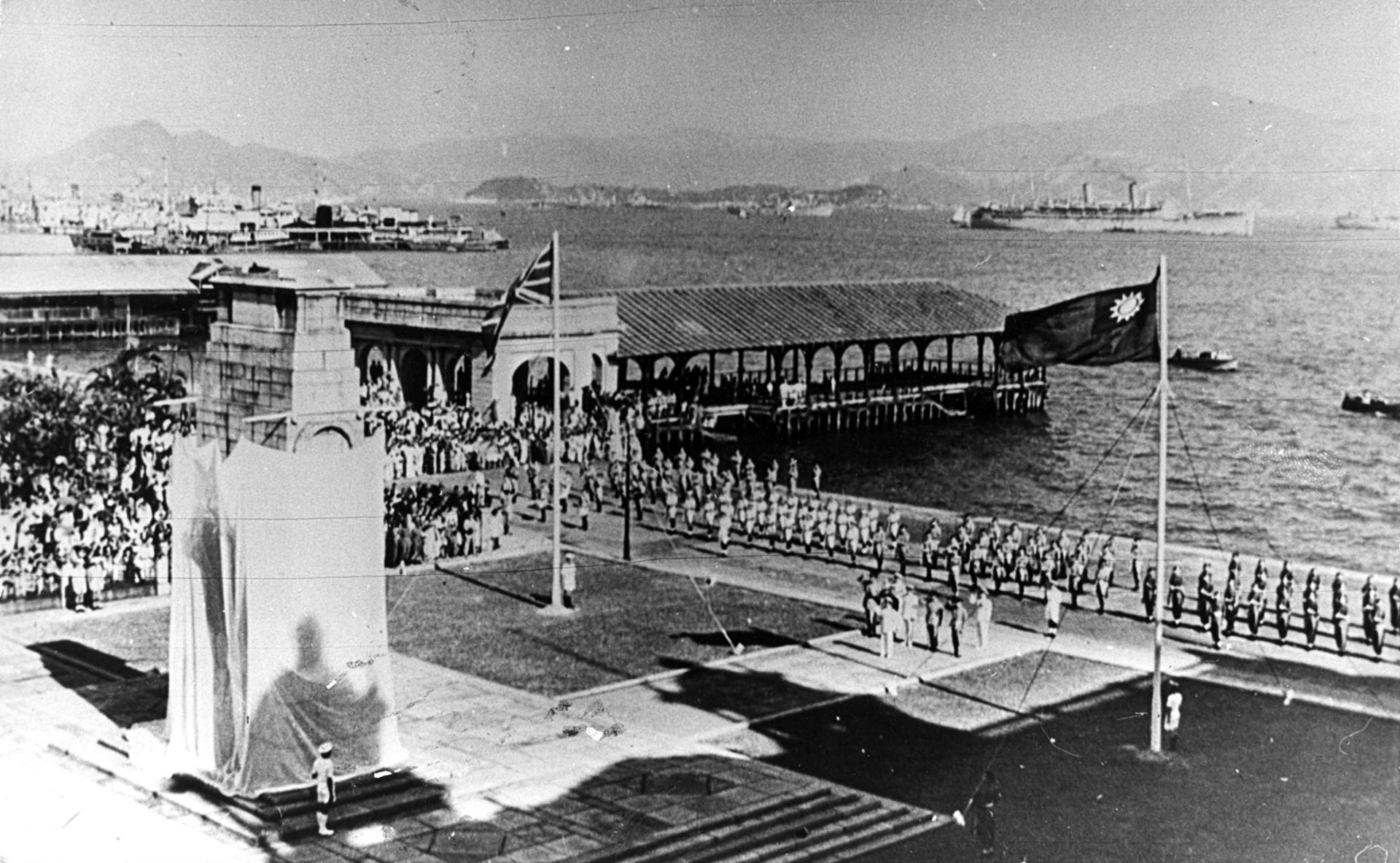
- Liberation of Hong Kong in 1945
- Official name: 重光紀念日
- Observed by: British Hong Kong
- Type: War Memorial
- Significance: commemorates liberation from Japanese occupation
- Date: Last Monday in August
- 2025 date: August 25
- 2026 date: August 31
- 2027 date: August 30
- 2028 date: August 28
- Frequency: annual
- First time: 1946
- Last time: 1996 (officially)
- Related to: Victory over Japan Day

Liberation Day
- Traditional Chinese: 重光紀念日
- Simplified Chinese: 重光纪念日
- Literal meaning: "Recover Light Memorial Day"
Transcriptions
Yue: Cantonese
- Yale Romanization: Chùng gwōng géi nim yat
- Jyutping: Cung^{4} gwong^{1} gei^{2} nim^{6} Jat^{6}

During British rule, Liberation Day celebrations took place in Hong Kong on the last Monday in August to commemorate the liberation of Hong Kong from Japanese occupation on 30 August 1945. No official ceremonies have taken place in Hong Kong since the handover to China in 1997. Nevertheless, unofficial delegations mark the day at The Cenotaph, and the flag poles are occasionally dressed.

On 9 September 1998, the Holidays (Amendment) Bill 1998, which included the abolition of the public holiday for Liberation Day, was passed.

The Memorial Day of the War of Resistance was created after 1997, referring to the Second Sino-Japanese War.

== See also ==
- Liberation of Hong Kong
