= Liberation of Hong Kong =

1945 end of the WWII Japanese occupation

- Part of World War II
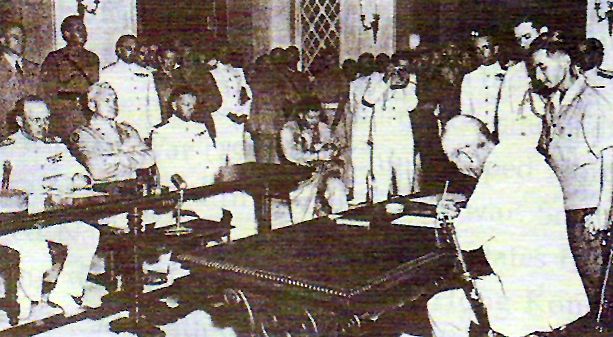
- On 16 September 1945, Japanese military officials signed surrender documents to Allied representatives at the Hong Kong Government House. British, American, Chinese, and Canadian delegations were present.
- Native name: 香港重光
- Date: 16 September 1945
- Also known as: British reoccupation of Hong Kong; Resumption of British sovereignty over Hong Kong
- Outcome: Resumption of British rule in Hong Kong

Chinese name
- Traditional Chinese: 香港重光 英國重佔香港 英國對香港恢復行使主權
Transcriptions
Yue: Cantonese
- Yale Romanization: heung1 gong2 chung4 gwong1
- Jyutping: hoeng1 gong2 cung4 gwong1

Japanese name
- Kanji: 香港の解放
- Hiragana: ほんこんのかいほう

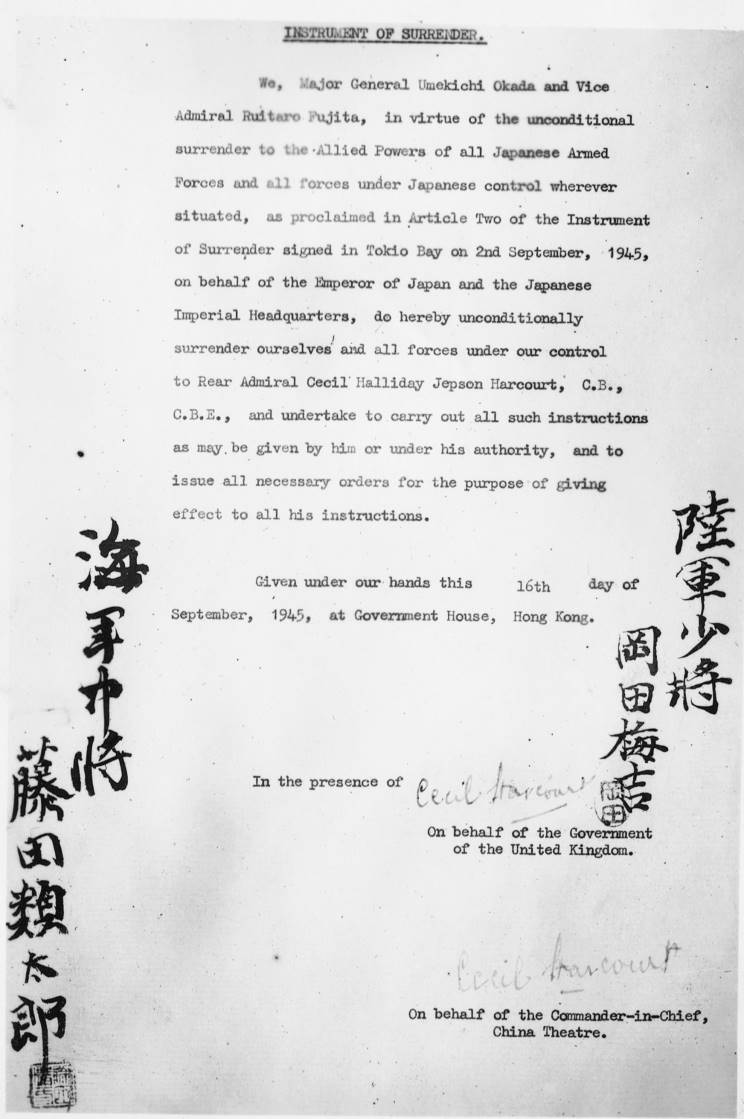
The surrender document signed by British and Japanese representatives at the Hong Kong Government House.

The Liberation of Hong Kong (Chinese: 香港重光), refers to the end of Japanese occupation of Hong Kong following Japanese surrender on 15 August 1945, the arrival of the Royal Navy on 30 August, and the official surrender ceremony in Hong Kong on 16 September. Prior to the surrender in the Cairo Conference, leader of Nationalist China Chiang Kai-Shek once requested that Hong Kong come under Nationalist control after the war, but the British rejected. As friction increased between Nationalists and Communists in China, Chiang relented and agreed to resume British sovereignty instead. In the position of Supreme Commander of Allied forces in China Theater, Chiang delegated Admiral of the Royal Navy Cecil Harcourt to accept Japanese surrender. As a result of British rule, Hong Kong was able to avoid the bloodshed of the Chinese Civil War and paved the way for economic growth.

== Gallery ==
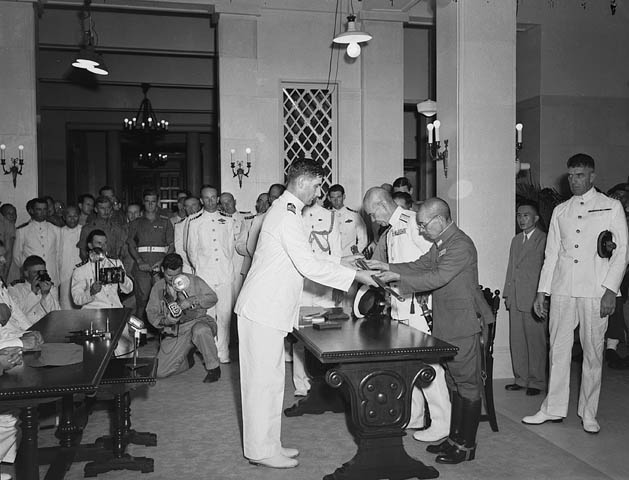
Major-General of the Imperial Japanese Army Umekichi Okada (岡田梅吉) placed his own tachi onto the hands of a British naval officer. This symbolizes the transfer of control from the Japanese forces to the British military.

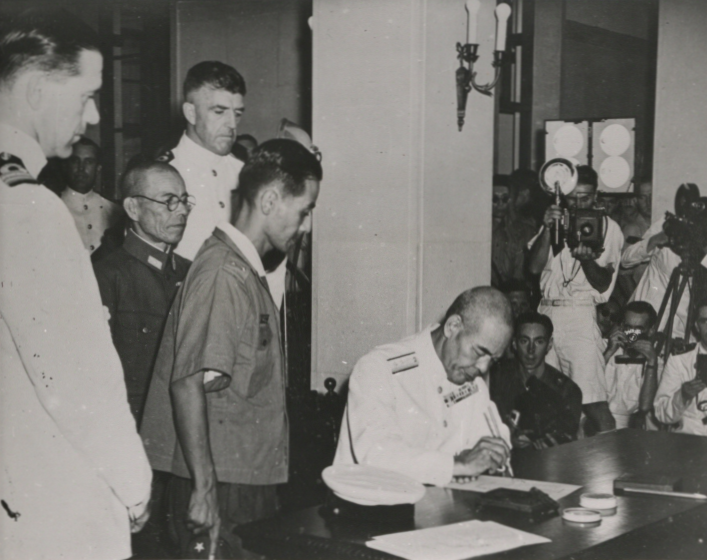
On 16 September 1945, Vice-Admiral of the Imperial Japanese Navy Ruitaro Fujita (藤田類太郎) signed surrender documents under the supervision of Admiral of the Royal Navy Cecil Harcourt.

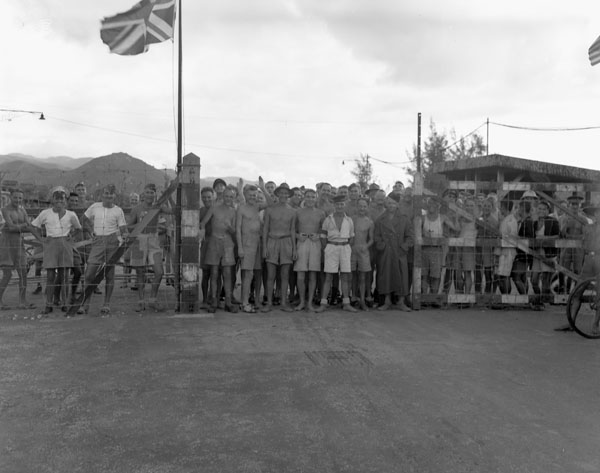
On 30 August 1945, British forces liberate camps holding British and Canadian POWs in Hong Kong.

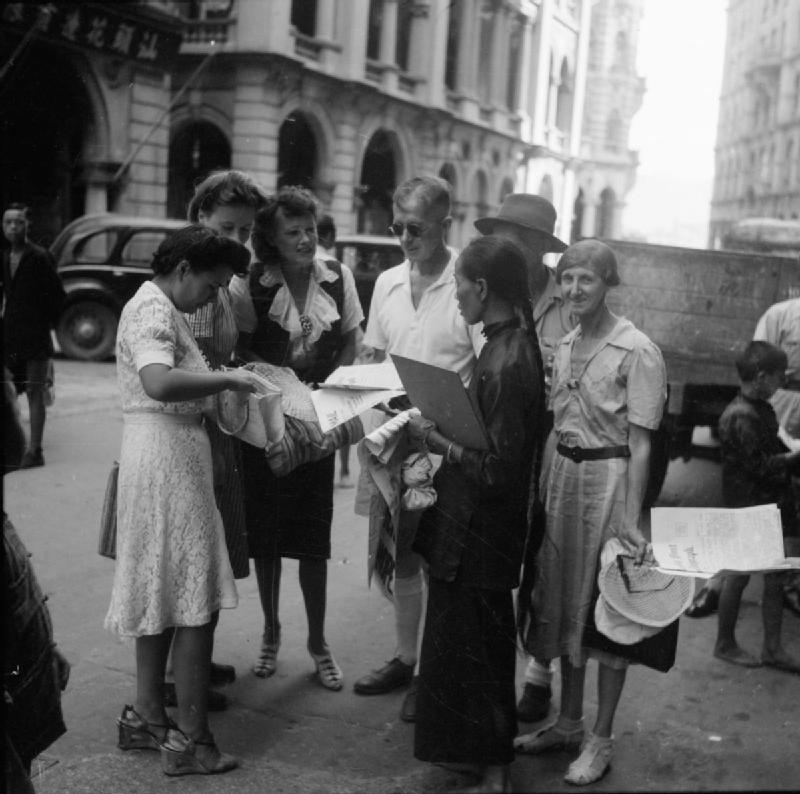
British and foreign nationals were freed at Stanley Prison after being imprisoned for more than three years. With help from British forces, they left camp and headed to city center, where they bought the first newspaper since liberation.

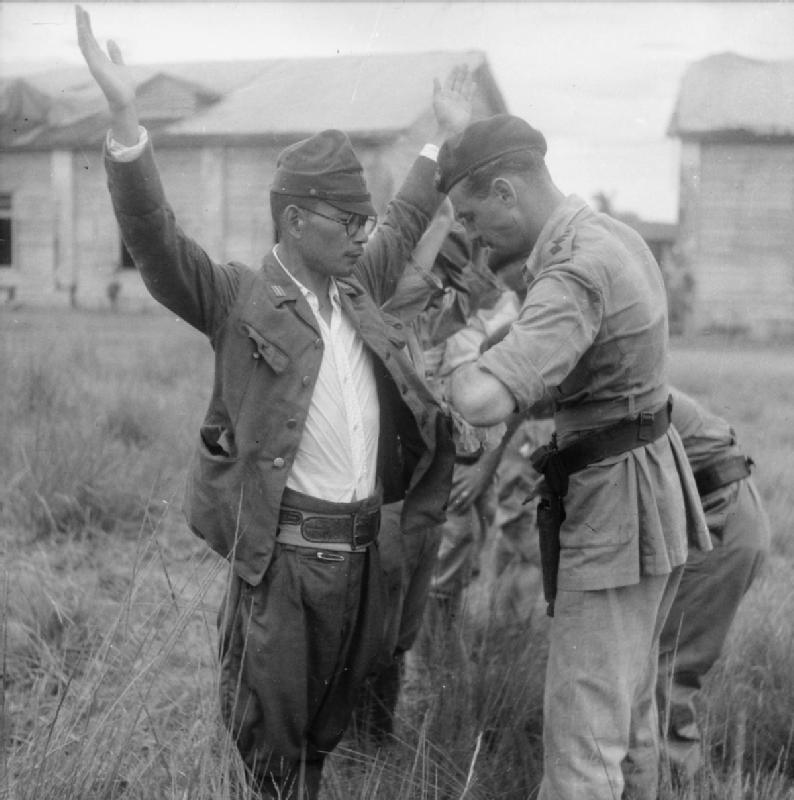
A British soldier body searching a surrendered Japanese soldier.

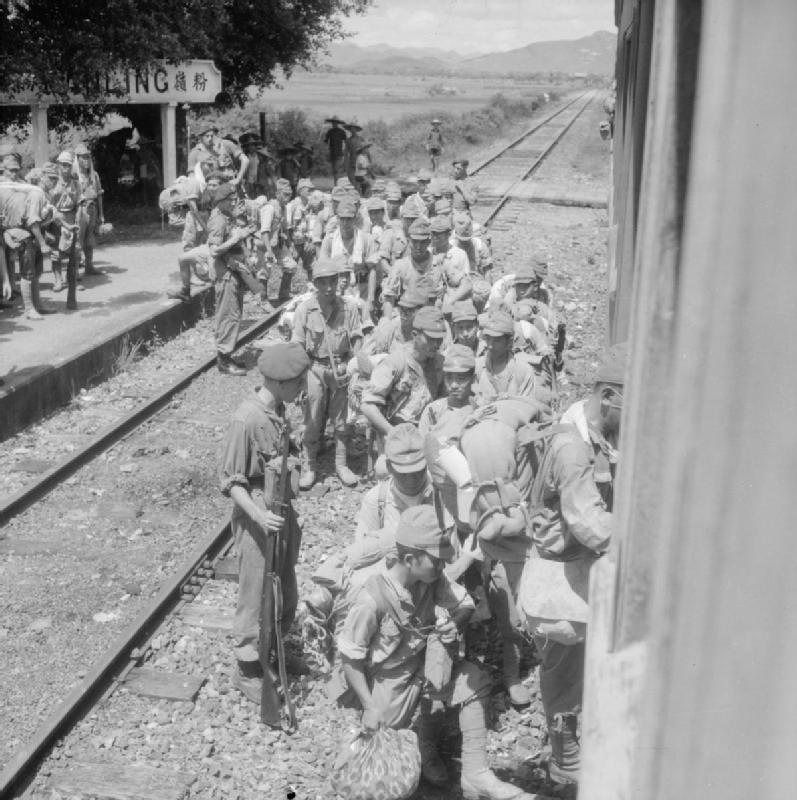
Surrendered Japanese troops board a train at Fanling station under the watch of British forces.

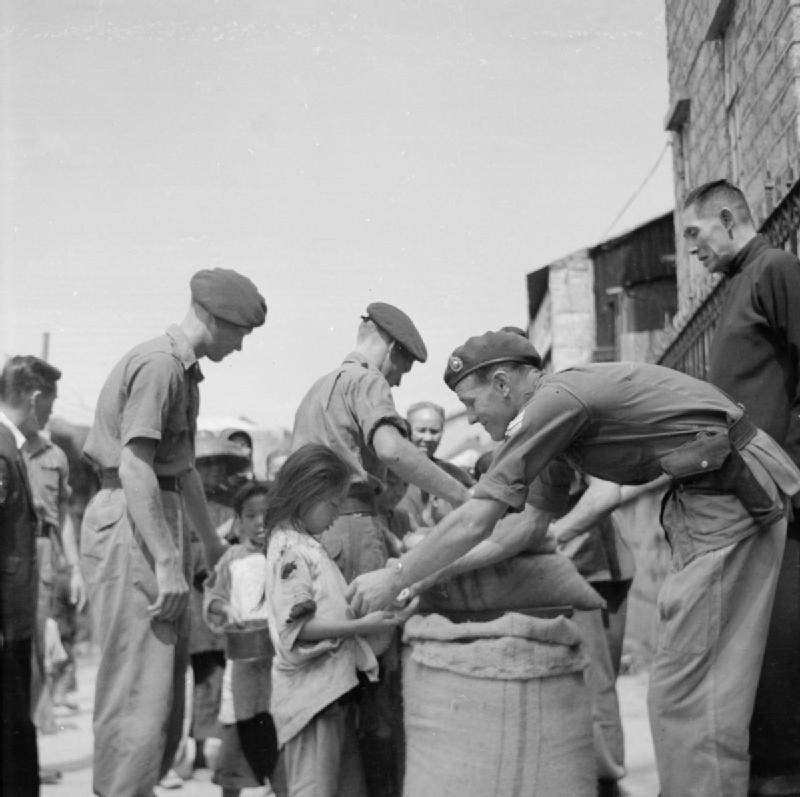
British soldiers passing out supplies to the residents of Cheung Chau. During Japanese rule, Hong Kong suffered from malnutrition due to lack of food supplies, and the British needed to ship in supplies to relieve the situation.

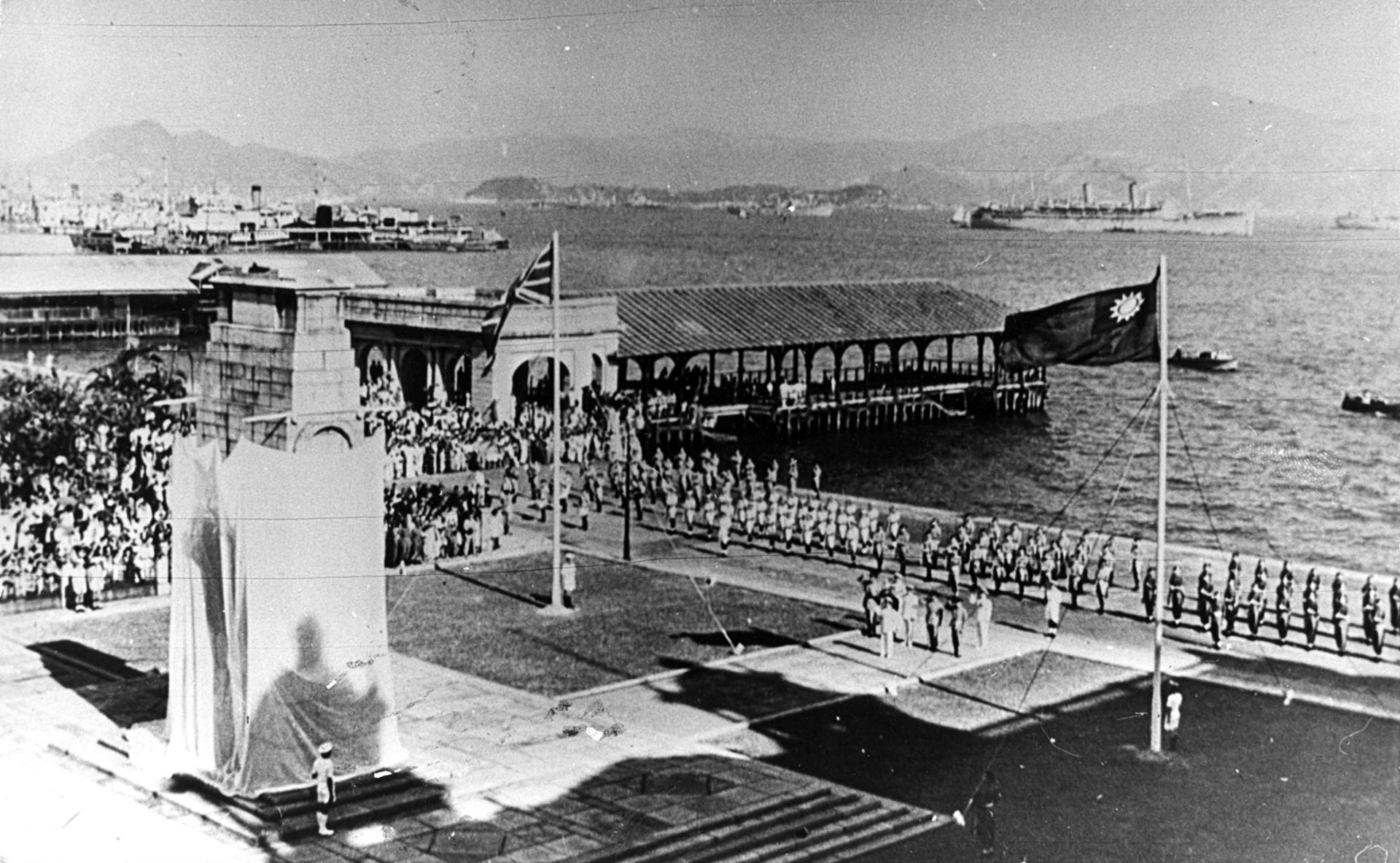
British forces conducting a victory march at the Cenotaph, flying both the Union Jack and the ROC flag.

Colonel Esao Tokunaga, held as a war criminal at Stanley Jail, Hong Kong. Tokunaga had been in charge of all prisoner of war camps in the Hong Kong area. On February 14, 1947, Tokunaga was sentenced to death by hanging, a sentence that was subsequently commuted to life imprisonment. He later died of old age.

== See also ==
- Japanese occupation of Hong Kong
- Operation Armour
- Liberation Day (Hong Kong)
