= Naval Long Service and Good Conduct Medal =

Naval Long Service and Good Conduct Medal could mean:

- Naval Long Service and Good Conduct Medal (1830), the Anchor type medal of the Royal Navy and Royal Marines
- Naval Long Service and Good Conduct Medal (1848), the Ship type medal of the Royal Navy and Royal Marines
