= Shamanism during the Qing dynasty =

Shamanism was the dominant religion of the Jurchen people of northeast Asia and of their descendants, the Manchu people. As early as the Jin dynasty (1115–1234), the Jurchens conducted shamanic ceremonies at shrines called tangse. There were two kinds of shamans: those who entered in a trance and let themselves be possessed by the spirits, and those who conducted regular sacrifices to heaven, to a clan's ancestors, or to the clan's protective spirits.

When Nurhaci (1559–1626), the chieftain of the Jianzhou Jurchens, who was originally a vassal to the Ming dynasty, unified other Jurchen tribes under his own rule and established the Later Jin dynasty in the early 17th century, he imposed the protective spirits of his clan, the Aisin Gioro, upon other clans, and often destroyed their shrines. As early as the 1590s, he placed shamanism at the center of his state's ritual, sacrificing to heaven before engaging in military campaigns. His son and successor Hong Taiji (1592–1643), who renamed the Jurchens "Manchu" and officially proclaimed the Qing dynasty (1644–1912) in 1636, further put shamanistic practices in the service of the state, notably by forbidding others to erect new tangse (shrines) for ritual purposes. In the 1620s and 1630s, the Qing ruler conducted shamanic sacrifices at the tangse of Mukden, the Qing capital. In 1644, as soon as the Qing seized Beijing to begin their conquest of China proper, they named it their new capital and erected an official shamanic shrine there. In the Beijing tangse and in the women's quarters of the Forbidden City, Qing emperors and professional shamans (usually women) conducted shamanic ceremonies until the abdication of the dynasty in 1912.

Until at least the eighteenth century, shamanism was at the core of Manchu spiritual life and differentiated Manchus from Han people even as Manchu Bannermen garrisoned in various cities in China proper were adopting many aspects of the Han lifestyle. In 1747 the Qianlong Emperor (r. 1735–1796) commissioned the publication of a "Shamanic Code" to revive and regulate shamanic practices, which he feared were becoming lost. He had it distributed to Bannermen to guide their practice, but we know very little about the effect of this policy. Mongols and Han were forbidden to attend shamanic ceremonies. Partly because of their secret aspect, these rituals attracted the curiosity of Beijing dwellers and visitors to the Qing capital. Even after the "Shamanic Code" was translated into Chinese and published in the 1780s, outsiders had little understanding of these practices.

During his fieldwork among the Tungusic populations of "Manchuria" in the 1910s, Russian anthropologist S. M. Shirokogoroff found enough surviving practices to build a theory of shamanism that shaped later theoretical debates about shamanism. Since the late 1980s, however, these theories have been criticized for neglecting the relation between shamanism and the state. Historians are now arguing that shamanistic practices in northeast Asia were intimately tied to the establishment of states, an analysis that fits the Qing case very well.

== Historical origins to 1644 ==
Shamanism is the religion most typical of Tungusic peoples of Northeast Asia. The word "shaman" itself (saman in the Manchu language) appears in every Tunguso-Manchurian language and seems to be of Tungusic origins. The most common religion among the Manchus was shamanism, which they and their ancestors the Jurchens practiced long before the Qing dynasty expanded into China proper.

=== Early Jurchen shamanism ===
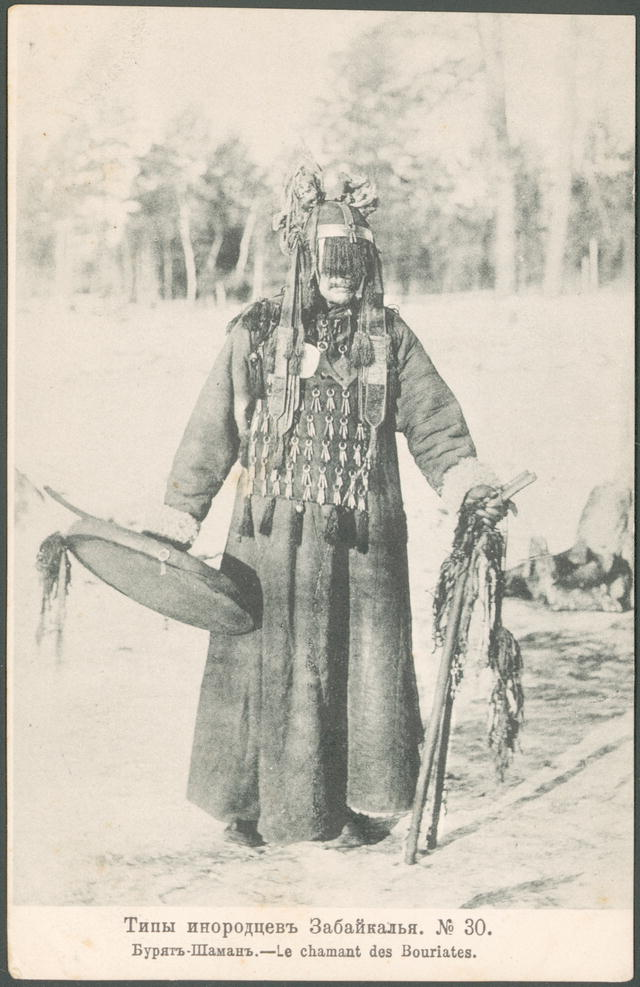
This Buryat shaman photographed in 1904 wore many of the same attributes as Manchu shamans, notably an apron, a cap, two wooden sticks, and a ritual drum.

The Manchu name for a shamanic shrine or altar to the spirits is tangse. Because its Chinese equivalent tangzi (堂子) means "hall", it may seem that tangse was derived from Chinese, but only around 1660 did tangse start to be translated as tangzi. Before that, it was rendered into Chinese as yemiao (謁廟), or "visitation temple". The term tangse may have originated in the portable "god boxes" (also "tangse") in which the Jurchens placed god figurines when they were still mobile hunters. Once Jurchen bands started to settle into palisaded villages (their typical kind of settlement), their tangse became permanent fixtures of the village.

Each clan—mukūn, a village or association of villages who claimed to share common ancestors—had its sacred protective spirits (enduri). The shaman (often a woman) was in charge of placating spirits and dead ancestors and of contacting them to seek a good hunt or harvest, quick healing, success in battle, and other such favors. The point of contact between the community and the spirits was the "spirit pole" (Manchu: šomo; Chinese: 神柱; pinyin: shénzhù). Shamans played a crucial role in these early Jurchen communities, as the authority of the clan headman often depended on the assent of the shaman.

There were two kinds of Jurchen shamanistic rituals, corresponding to two kinds of shamans. The most common was "domestic ritual": ritual-based sacrifices to Heaven and to the clan's ancestors conducted by hereditary shamans from that clan. "Primitive ritual", on the other hand, was performed by people who had undergone a "shamanic illness", which was seen as a sign that they had been chosen by the spirits. Entering into a trance, these "transformational" shamans let themselves be possessed by various animal spirits and sought the help of these spirits for purposes like healing or exorcism. These shamans set up an altar in their own houses and received a different kind of training than hereditary shamans.

Manchu shamans typically wore an apron, a feathered cap denoting their ability to fly to the spirit world, and a belt with dangling bells, and carried a knife, two wooden sticks with bells affixed to the top, and a drum they used during ceremonies. These attributes could still be observed among shamans from Manchuria and Mongolia in the early twentieth century.

=== Shamanism after the rise of Nurhaci ===
Jurchen shamanic practices were transformed by the rise of the Later Jin founder Nurhaci (1559–1626). As he started to unify the Jurchen tribes, Nurhaci destroyed the tangse of the defeated tribes and replaced their protective deities with the magpie, the totemic animal of his own clan, the Aisin Gioro. Tribes that voluntarily joined Nurhaci were allowed to keep their own gods. This absorption of other clans' shamanic rituals into those of Nurhaci's clan started a process of "state codification of religion" that continued into the eighteenth century.

In another transformation that "mirrored the process of political centralization" in Nurhaci's state, the traditional Jurchen belief in multiple heavens was replaced by one Heaven, called "Abka", led by a universal sky god called Abka Enduri ("Sky God" or "God of Heaven"), also referred to as Abka Han ("Sky Khan" or "Khan of Heaven") and Abka Ama ("Sky Father"). This new shamanic Heaven became the object of a state cult similar to that of the Jurchen rulers' cult of Heaven in the Jin dynasty (1115–1234) and to Genghis Khan's worship of Tengri in the thirteenth century. This state sacrifice became an early counterpart to the worship of Heaven by the Han people. From as early as the 1590s, Nurhaci appealed to Heaven as, "the arbiter of right and wrong". He worshipped Heaven at a shamanic shrine in 1593 before leaving for a campaign against the Yehe, a Jurchen tribe that belonged to the rival Hūlun confederacy. Qing annals also report that when Nurhaci announced his Seven Great Grievances against the Ming dynasty in April 1618, he conducted a shamanic ceremony during which he burned an oath to Heaven written on a piece of yellow paper. This ceremony was deliberately omitted from the later Chinese translation of this event by the Qing court.

Nurhaci's son Hong Taiji (r. 1626–1643), who renamed the Jurchens "Manchus" in 1635, forbade commoners and officials from erecting shamanic shrines for ritual purposes, making the tangse "the monopoly of the ruler". He also banned shamans from treating illness, albeit with little success. The Old Manchu Archives, a chronicle documenting Manchu history from 1607 to 1636, show that state rituals were held at the tangse of the Qing capital Mukden in the 1620s and 1630s. Just before commanding Banner troops into China proper in early 1644, Prince Dorgon (1612–1650), who was then regent to the newly enthroned Shunzhi Emperor (r. 1643–1661), led the other Manchu princes in worshipping Heaven at the Mukden tangse.

Shamans could also be used for personal purposes, as when Nurhaci's eldest son Cuyen supposedly tried to bewitch the entire Aisin Gioro lineage with the help of shamans in 1612.

== State shamanism after 1644 ==
=== The Beijing tangse ===
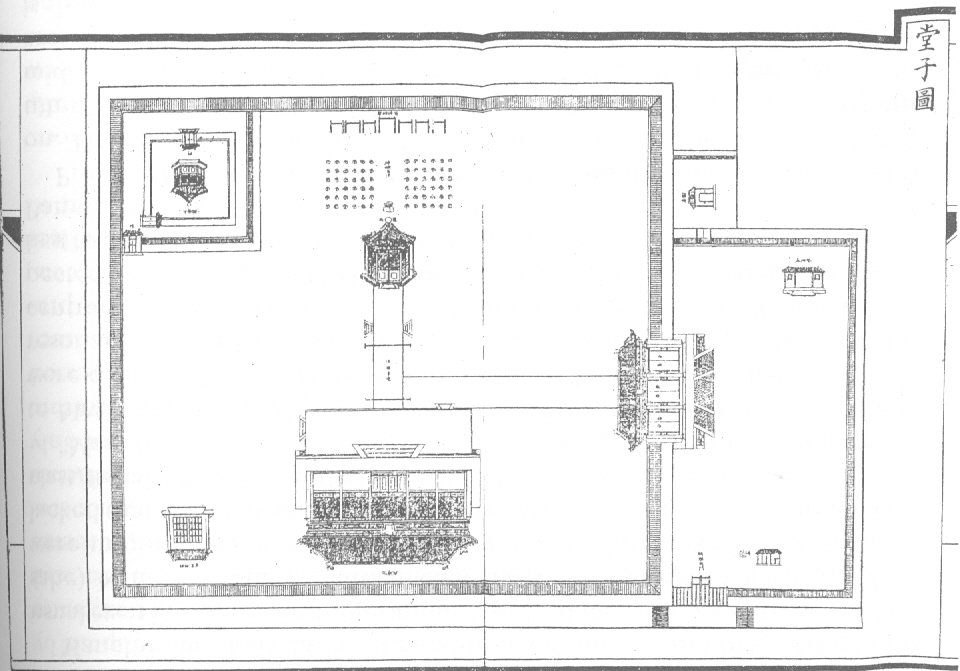
An official illustration of the shamanic shrine (tangse) where Qing emperors performed sacrifices to Heaven from 1644 (the year it was built) to 1900 (the year it was destroyed during the Boxer Uprising).

In 1644, just a few months after the Qing seized the city of Beijing from the peasant rebels led by Li Zicheng who had pushed the last emperor of the Ming dynasty to suicide, the Manchus constructed a new tangse in the city, modeled on the tangse of the former Qing capital Mukden. This "Manchu shamanist sanctuary", an octagonal building whose shape was specific to the Aisin Gioro clan, was located outside the Imperial City to the southeast, but still within the Inner City occupied by Bannermen, making it convenient for imperial visits. There, the emperor made offerings to Heaven and various other deities, including the horse spirit and the Manchu progenitor. Ethnic Han and Mongol peoples were strictly forbidden from entering this ritual area.

The Qing state's main shamanistic ritual was performed at the tangse by the emperor on the first day of the New Year. In the Shunzhi (1644–1661), Kangxi (1662–1722), and Yongzheng (1723–1735) eras, this ceremony was the emperor's first activity on the first day of the New Year, but sometime during the Qianlong era (1736–1796) it fell to the second rank after private sacrifices to the Aisin Gioro ancestors. Even with this somewhat diminished importance, these shamanic rites continued to the end of the dynasty.

The tangse was destroyed in 1900 by foreign powers in the aftermath of the Boxer Uprising as part of reprisals for the two-month siege of the international Legation Quarter. A new shrine was rebuilt inside the palace in December 1901. Its former site became part of the expanded Italian legation. Historian Mark Elliott notes that in today's Beijing, the old tangse would have been located on East Chang'an Avenue, "directly opposite the 'modern' wing of the Beijing Hotel".

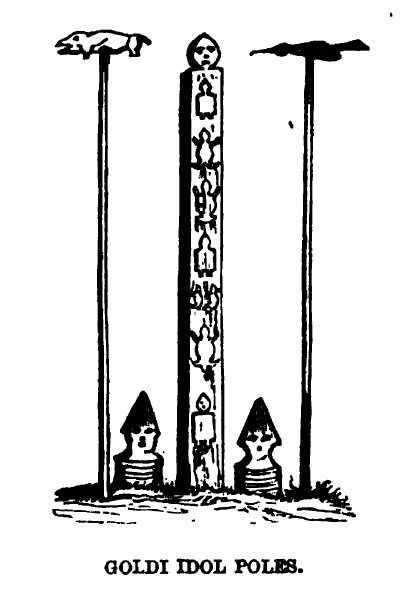
"Spirit poles"—as drawn here by a Russian explorer in the Amur region in the 1850s or 1860s—served as a point of contact between a community and the spirits. The Qing built one in the women's quarters of the Forbidden City to conduct shamanic ceremonies.

=== Kunning Palace ===
Daily shamanistic rites were also conducted in the women's quarters, in the Palace of Earthly Tranquility (Chinese: 坤寧宮; pinyin: Kunning gong), a building located near the north gate of the Forbidden City, on the central axis of the palace complex. This palace had served as the Empress's residence under the Ming dynasty, but the Qing converted it for ritual use, installing a "spirit pole" to present sacrifices to heaven, changing the style of the windows, and setting up large cauldrons to cook sacrificial food.

The shamans in the Kunning Palace were all women. In the Shunzhi era (1644–1661), the sacrifices were performed by the wives of Aisin Gioro men and by the emperor's consorts. After that, the shamanesses were selected from the wives of "imperial guards" (Chinese: 侍衛; pinyin: shìwèi), high officials belonging to Gioro households registered in the "Upper Three Banners", which belonged directly to the emperor. These shamanesses (Chinese: 薩滿太太; pinyin: sāmǎn tàitài), who were assisted by eunuchs, were managed by the "Office of Shamanism" (Chinese: 神房; pinyin: shénfáng), a bureau under the authority of the Imperial Household Department. Only members of the imperial clan could attend such ceremonies.

=== Role in Qing rulership ===
The Qing emperor used shamanism to promote the dynasty's legitimacy among the Tungusic peoples such as the Evenks, Daur and Oroqen who lived near the northeastern borders of the empire. They were taught the Manchu language and Manchu fashion, as well as legends recounting how Qing founder Nurhaci had been assisted by the spirits in his many exploits. Qing emperors adopted different images to address the different subjects of their multi-ethnic empire. The Qing used the title of Emperor (Huangdi or hūwangdi) in Chinese and Manchu (along with titles like the Son of Heaven and Ejen), and Qing emperors were referred to as "Emperor of China" (or "Chinese Emperor") and "the Great Emperor" (or "Great Emperor Manjushri") by their Tibetan subjects (such as in the 1856 Treaty of Thapathali), as "Bogda Khan" or "(Manchu) Emperor" by their Mongol subjects, and as "Khagan of China" (or "Chinese khagan") by their Turkic Muslim subjects (now known as the Uyghurs). Qing rulers like the Qianlong Emperor portrayed the image of himself as a Buddhist sage ruler, a patron of Tibetan Buddhism in the hope to appease the Mongols and Tibetans. As the Son of Heaven, the Qing sponsored imperial examinations based on the Chinese classics and worshipped at the Temple of Heaven. Shamanism was thus only one aspect of the Qing's "extraordinarily flexible view of community and rulership".

=== Healing rituals ===
Besides state ritual, the Manchus often resorted to shamans to treat illness. In 1649 Dorgon's brother Dodo, who had helped the Qing conquer southern China in 1645, fell ill with smallpox, a highly contagious disease that the Manchus particularly dreaded. He called a shaman named Jingguda to his bedside, but the shaman's ritual therapies failed and Dodo died in April 1649 at the age of 35. After variolation began in 1681, shamanic sacrifices were performed for imperial sons who survived inoculation. The Kangxi Emperor (r. 1661–1722) attempted to cure his sixth son Yinzuo (胤祚) with shamanic rites in June 1685, but that son died a few days later.

== The "Shamanic Code" of 1747 ==
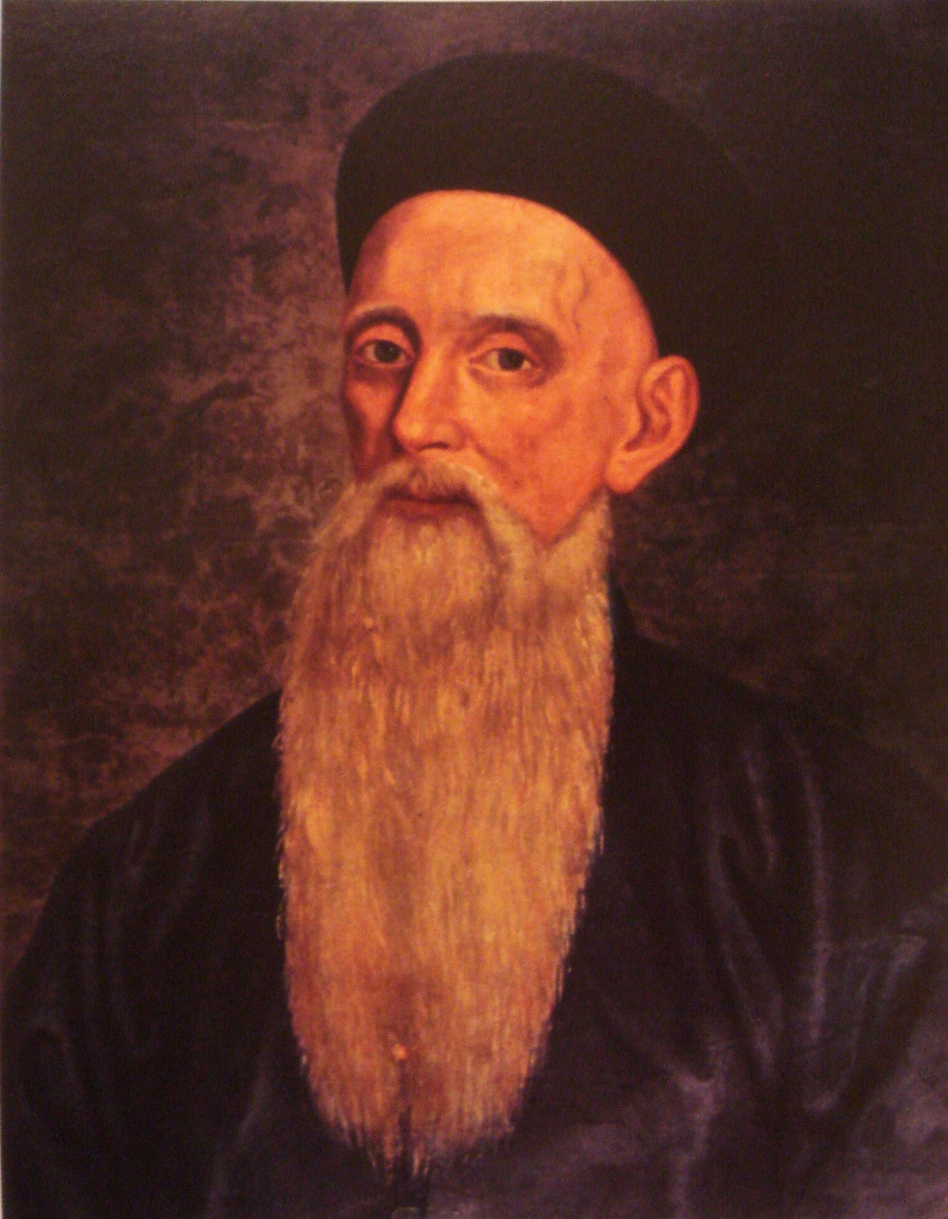
French Jesuit missionary Joseph-Marie Amiot, who published the first European study of the Manchu Shamanic Code in 1773

In the 1740s, the Qianlong Emperor worried that shamanic traditions were becoming lost, especially among the Manchu Bannermen who lived in garrisons throughout the empire. To fight this trend, in 1741 he commissioned a "Shamanic Code", based on the rites of the imperial clan, that would explain the use of shamanic instruments and the meaning of Manchu ritual incantations, many of which had been transmitted by officiants who were not fluent in Manchu, to the point of becoming nonsensical. It was completed in 1747. Its full title in Manchu was ᡥᡝᠰᡝᡳ
ᡨᠣᡴᡨᠣᠪᡠᡥᠠ
ᠮᠠᠨᠵᡠᠰᠠᡳ
ᠸᡝᠴᡝᡵᡝ
ᠮᡝᡨᡝᡵᡝ
ᡴᠣᠣᠯᡳ
ᠪᡳᡨᡥᡝ Wylie: Ghesei toktopuha Manchusai wetchere metere kauli pitghe, Möllendorff: Hesei toktobuha Manjusai wecere metere kooli bithe, which scholars have translated variously as "Imperially commissioned Manchu rituals for sacrificing to deities and to Heaven", "Rites for the Manchu worship of Heaven and the spirits", and "Imperially commissioned code of rituals and sacrifices of the Manchus". The Code attempted to formalize Manchu shamanistic practices. Historian Pamela Crossley sees it as part of the Qianlong Emperor's attempts to "standardize the cultural and spiritual life of the Manchus", taking the practices of the imperial clan as a model.

Though the Shamanic Code was first kept in manuscript form, French Jesuit Joseph-Marie Amiot had a study on it, Rituels des Tartares Mandchous déterminés et fixés par l'empereur comme chef de sa religion, published in Amsterdam in 1773. In 1777 the Qianlong Emperor ordered the code translated into Chinese for inclusion in the Complete Library of the Four Treasuries. The Manchu version was printed in 1778, whereas the Chinese-language edition, titled Qinding Manzhou jishen jitian dianli (欽定滿洲祭神祭天典禮), was completed in 1780 or 1782.

The compilation of this Code "opened Qing shamanism to bureaucratic review" and modified the practices of ordinary Manchus. The Code was distributed to Bannermen to guide their practices. Commercial editions were even produced for sale to the common public. One of these editions, the Manzhou tiaoshen huanyuan dianli (滿洲跳神還願典例), dated 1828, has survived. Even though this "Shamanic Code" did not fully unify shamanic practice among the Banners, it "helped systematize and reshape what had been a very fluid and diverse belief system".

== Diversity of practices ==
There is little evidence concerning the shamanic practices of common Bannermen in the garrisons. We know that after the publication of the "Shamanic Code" some clans (like the Šušu) and tribes (like the Xibe) also wrote down their rituals and incantations, showing that the court model was not always followed. Shamanic sacrifices among ordinary households were simpler than those of the imperial clan. Noble Manchus in Beijing often erected spirit poles in their private homes, but because Manchu households were forbidden from having private tangse shrines, they made offerings to the spirit at a small altar called a weceku, where they installed portraits of their ancestors as well as a clan genealogy.

The worship of heaven in the Chinese imperial tradition paralleled shamanistic sacrifices, but only the emperor made offerings to the Chinese heaven, whereas ordinary Manchus could also worship shamanistic heaven. Both Chinese and Manchu heaven were an "all-encompassing principle of cosmic order and human destiny" that could be used to give the state legitimacy.

In their shamanic ceremonies, Manchus worshipped a number of gods, including non-Tungusic deities. Guandi and the bodhisattva (Buddhist "enlightened being") Guanyin were two of a "handful of Chinese gods" who were integrated into the rituals of the state tangse and Kunning Palace. One of the four ritual sites in the tangse was a large hall where the Buddha, Guanyin, and Guandi received offerings several times a year, including at the New Year. Ordinary Manchu households rarely sacrificed to Buddhist deities, but almost all of them worshipped Guandi because of his association with war.

== Shamanism and Manchu identity ==
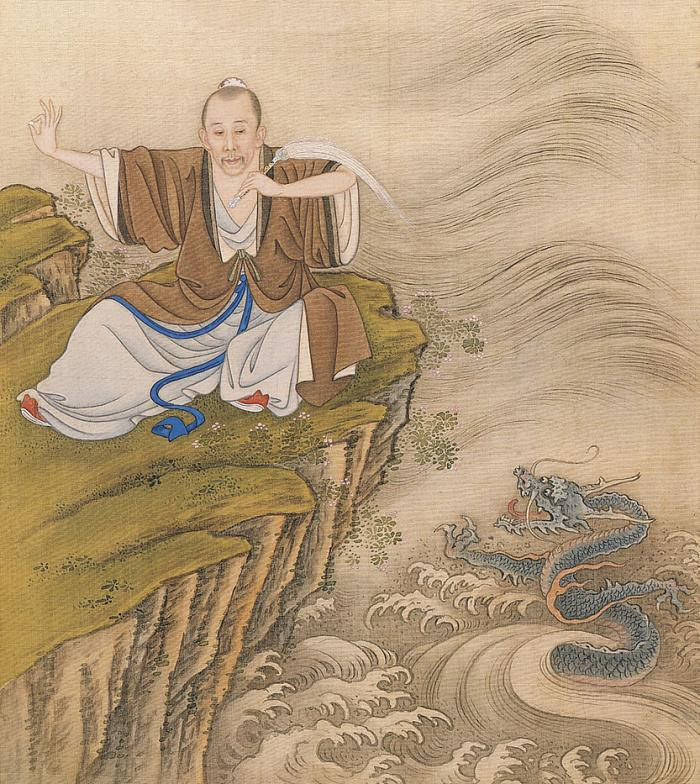
The Yongzheng Emperor (r. 1722–1735), here portrayed as a Daoist adept, reprimanded Manchu converts to Christianity for worshipping the "Lord of Heaven" through a foreign religion rather than through shamanism, which he claimed was the proper Manchu way of worshipping heaven.

At least into the eighteenth century, shamanism served to strengthen Manchu ethnic identity by forming "the spiritual core of Manchu life". The Qing emperors also used shamanism to shape Manchu identity. In an edict dated 17 April 1727 in which he opposed the Jesuit China missions which attempted to convert the Han and the Manchus to Catholic Church, the Yongzheng Emperor (r. 1722–1735) singled out Manchu converts for criticism. To the emperor, the "Lord of Heaven"—the Jesuit name for God in Chinese—was none other than the Heaven the Han and Manchus already worshipped. To convince Manchu nobles that they should use existing Manchu rituals for worshipping Heaven, he explained that, "In the empire we have a temple for honoring Heaven and sacrificing to Him. We Manchus have Tiao Tchin. The first day of every year we burn incense and paper to honor Heaven. We Manchus have our own particular rites for honoring Heaven." In this edict, which we know through a French translation by court Jesuit Antoine Gaubil, Tiao Tchin refers to Tiao Shen (跳神, literally "spirit-jumping"), the Chinese name of the Manchu shamanic ceremony.

According to historian Pamela Kyle Crossley, proficiency with shamanism was among the qualities that the Qianlong Emperor (r. 1735–1796) promoted as being part of the "Old Way" (fe doro) of the Manchus when he attempted to formalize the Manchu heritage late in his reign. Mark Elliott has countered that he has never seen shamanism listed among "the qualities the court expected of Manchus" in any Qing documents, and that shamanism was therefore "never formally enunciated as part of the Manchu Way" (Manjusai doro). Nicola Di Cosmo of the Institute for Advanced Study comments that once Manchu rituals were codified into formal regulations, they became "mere simulacra of the ancestral cults" and lost their place at the center of the spiritual life of Manchu clans. Nonetheless, the persistence of shamanistic practices at the Qing court into the twentieth century suggests that the Manchus were not automatically "sinicized" by the sole fact that they ruled over China.

Elliott argues that "shamanism contributed to Manchu identity ... by constructing a very obvious boundary between Manchu and Han". Ethnic Han residents and visitors, who were forbidden to observe the rituals performed at the shamanic shrine, saw these rites as "different and mysterious" or "secret and alien". A visitor to Beijing in the early Qing remarked that the Tangzi was one of the three things one did not ask about in the capital. The difference between shamanic rites and Han rituals still "aroused significant interest". Korean visitors from Joseon, for instance, often "asked questions about the secret Manchu rites in the Tangzi". Writers who wanted to satisfy their readers' curiosity about these exotic practices could only speculate or rely on the late eighteenth-century Shamanic Code. This is why nineteenth-century accounts by Han people about Manchu rituals are "fragmentary and often error-prone", while their explanations of ritual language are "positively confusing".

== Scholarly interpretations ==
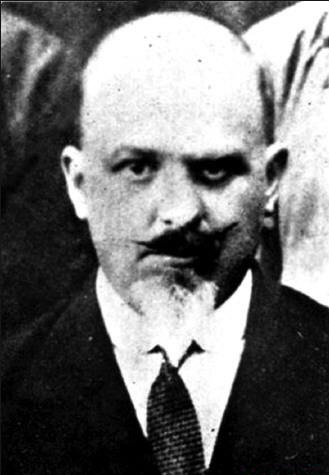
The Russian ethnologist S. M. Shirokogoroff, whose influential theories on shamanism were based on his fieldwork among the Manchus

During his fieldwork among the Tungusic peoples of "Manchuria" from 1912 to 1918, Russian anthropologist S. M. Shirokogoroff (1887–1939) found enough surviving practices to develop an influential theory of shamanism. He noted that the northern Tungus had been heavily influenced by Manchu language and culture: they wore Manchu clothing and hairstyle, read Manchu books, and conducted weddings and funerals according to Manchu customs. As he also discovered, the Manchus venerated many Buddhist deities, so much that he hypothesized that northeast Asian shamanism was an outgrowth of Buddhism. This thesis has not been widely accepted. His definition of shamanism, however, has been widely discussed. Equipped with specific ritual implements, the shaman enters into a trance to gain control of harmful spirits who cause illness or misfortune to a clan or a tribe. His role is recognized by his society, and there is an explicit explanation of how he masters the spirits.

Shirokogoroff claimed that true shamanism only existed among the Tungus and the Manchus, but despite his warnings that Tungus shamanism could only be understood in relation to all other elements of Tungus culture, and that his findings should therefore not serve to develop a general interpretation of shamanism, Shirokogoroff's ideas have shaped theoretical debates about shamanism. Social anthropologists Raymond Firth (1901–2002) and Ioan Lewis (b. 1930)—the latter a student of E. E. Evans-Pritchard—drew from Shirokogoroff's work to emphasize the social roles of shamans. Lewis's influential analysis of spirit possession was also directly inspired by Shirokogoroff. Historian of religion Mircea Eliade (1907–1986) borrowed from the Russian ethnologist and many others to build his seminal theory of shamanism, which he presented in Shamanism: Archaic Techniques of Ecstasy (1964, based on a French original dated 1951). Eliade's notion of "classic shamanism" or "shamanism in the strict and proper sense" was based on Siberian models. But whereas Shirokogoroff emphasized that control over the spirits was the chief function of shamanic rituals, Eliade stated that the ecstatic and visionary spirit-journey induced by trance was the most central aspect of shamanism.

Shirokogoroff's and Eliade's views of shamanism were both centered on individuals and on the role of shamans in small groups. Shirokogoroff, for instance, considered eighteenth-century Qing shamanism too formalized to be authentic. Historians of northeast Asia have criticized Eliade's and Shirokogoroff's interpretations because they neglect the political roles of shamans and shamanism's relation with the state. Eliade's claim that shamanism is by essence archaic, individualistic, and socially transgressive led him and his followers to neglect historical contexts in which shamanism fulfilled political functions or served the needs of the state, as it did under the Qing.

== See also ==
- Islam during the Qing dynasty
