= Chinese names for the God of Abrahamic religions =

In the Chinese common religion and philosophical schools the idea of the universal God has been expressed in a variety of names and representations, most notably as 天 (Tiān, "Heaven") and 上帝 (Shàngdì, "Highest Deity" or "Highest Emperor").

These two and other concepts have been variously combined, in diverse contexts, to form titles such as:

- Huáng Tiān Shàngdì (皇天上帝; Huáng, "Emperor" + Tiān + Shàngdì) or Xuán Tiān Shàngdì (玄天上帝; Xuán, "North" + Tiān + Shàngdì)
- Shàngtiān (Shàng + Tiān, "Highest Heaven")
- Tiāntáng (Tiān + Táng, "Hall of Heaven").

The compounds tiānshén (tiān + shén, meaning "heavenly god") and tiānxiān (tiān + xiān, meaning "heavenly immortal") have been used for a deity, in a polytheistic sense. The word Dì by itself has likewise been used for God.

When Abrahamic religions penetrated China, they appropriated some of the traditional titles, or created new compound titles, to express their theology.

== General uses ==
Outside of direct translations in religious books, the following are often-encountered translations of the Abrahamic God in general usage.

=== Judaism ===
Jewish history in China is represented mainly by the Kaifeng Jews, who have historically been called 赐乐业 (Yīcìlèyè or similar — a transcription of “Israel”), 挑筋教 (Tiǎojīn jiào — “the religion that removes the sinew” — referring to the kosher prohibition on the sciatic nerve), 蓝帽回回 (Lánmào Huíhui — “blue-hatted Muslims” — distinguishing them visually from Muslims), and forms such as 术忽 / 石忽 (Shùhū / Shíhū) and related transliterations of Persian/Arabic terms for Jews.

The term Yóutài (犹太) was coined/popularized in the 19th century (notably by the missionary Karl Gützlaff around 1833) as a transliteration related to “Judah/Yehudi.” It is the basis for the modern standard terms for Jews (犹太人 — Yóutài rén) and Judaism (犹太教 — Yóutài jiào).

There is no single exclusive historical term used only for the Jewish God, because Chinese terminology for the Abrahamic God developed mainly in Christian missionary contexts and often overlapped.

=== Nestorian Christianity ===
The earliest introduction of documented Christian religion appears to be Jǐng jiào (景教, literally, "bright teaching") around 635 AD, whose proponents were Nestorian Christians from Persia. Their term for God was Zhēnzhǔ (真主, literally "Veritable Majesty," "True Lord," or "Lord of Truth."). In a hymn supposed to be composed by Lü Dongbin, the Christian God is denominated by the term Tiānzhǔ (天主, literally, "Lord of Heaven"), 800 years before Matteo Ricci and his companions.

The Nestorians in China sometimes used terms influenced by Buddhist or Chinese religious vocabulary in related figures and titles in older texts, but the core name for Jesus was usually translated/transliterated phonetically, and soon settled into the Yēsū (耶稣) form that remains standard today.

=== Islam ===
Islam has enjoyed a long history in China. For Chinese Muslims, the principal term for God is also Zhēnzhǔ (真主) but transliterations of the Arabic Allāh also exist as Ālā (阿拉), and as Ānlā (安拉; Ān, "Peace" + Lā, "Help"). The term Húdà (胡大), from the Persian term for God, khuda (خدا), is seen more often in north-western China and among the Dungans of Central Asia.

=== Catholic Christianity ===
The earliest documented Chinese Catholic church was founded in China in about 1289. The Catholic Church historically favored Tiānzhǔ (天主, literally "Heavenly Lord" or "Lord of Heaven"), and so "Catholicism" is most commonly rendered Tiānzhǔ jiào (天主教; Tiānzhǔ + jiào, "teach"), although among Chinese Catholics the literal translation of "catholic", Gōng jiào (公教; gōng, "universal" + jiào), is also used. Korean and Vietnamese Catholics also use cognates of the term Tiānzhǔ for God. This appears to have been used by the Catholic Church to separate Confucian traditions, which were reported to worship spirits and therefore were incompatible with the exclusive biblical worship of God. Ironically, although versions of popular Confucianism became strongly associated with idol worship, traditionalists, notably the Kangxi Emperor, did not believe that such idolization accurately reflected Confucius's intent; Matteo Ricci also considered Confucius to be a philosopher rather than the founder of a religion.

=== Protestantism ===
The earliest Protestant missionary to China, Robert Morrison, arrived there in 1807. Before this time, Bibles were not printed for distribution. Protestantism is colloquially referred to as Jīdū jìao (基督教, meaning "religion of Christ") but this term can sometimes refer to all Christians, so Xīnjìao (新教, literally, "new religion") is also used to distinguish Protestants as a group separate from Catholics. Their translators, coming to China later and separately, chose to use the older terminology Shàngdì, apparently believing Shàngdì was a valid or preferable representation of the "Most High God".

== Translations ==
A number of terms for "God" exist in the Christian Bible. For example, the first occurrence of a term for God in the Bible is in Genesis 1:1 and is rendered in the English as "God". However, many other titles (such as LORD – usually capitalized, as a replacement for the tetragrammaton – Almighty, etc.) are also used.

=== God ===
The term used commonly in Protestant Chinese bibles for God is Shén (神). This term is much more generic, meaning god, God, spirit, or soul. This probably appeals to groups who are not committed to interpreting the term Shàngdì as a historical or spiritual equivalent to the "God Most High" of the Bible. The issue has remained controversial for over a century and Protestant organizations have published two versions of the Bible, using the two different words.

=== Tetragrammaton ===
In addition, the Tetragrammaton, a four letter pronunciation of the name of God from the original Hebrew, often rendered as "YHWH", is rendered in different ways. Catholics have translated this into Yǎwēi (雅威, literally "Elegant Powerful," cf. English "Yahweh"). Protestants originally rendered it as Yéhuǒhuá (爺火華, literally "(old) Gentleman of Fiery Magnificence," cf. English "Jehovah"). A modern Protestant usage is Yēhéhuá (耶和華, a phonetic translation). Some versions translate this term as Shàngzhǔ (上主, literally "Lord Above"), similar to the translation decision that uses a capitalized "LORD" by both Catholics and traditional Protestants. Catholics, Anglicans, and Lutherans particularly use Shàngzhǔ in prayers of the Eucharist.

=== Lord ===
The term Zhǔ (主, literally "Lord") is used by both Catholics and traditional Protestants in less formal prayers, and usually by contemporary Protestants.

Other less formal terms are used, for example, Tīanfù (天父, literally "Heavenly Father").

== See also ==
- Christianity in China
  - Catholicism in China
    - Chinese Rites controversy
  - Protestantism in China
  - Chinese Christian theology
- History of the Jews in China
- Islam in China
- Tian
