= Chinese Rites controversy =

High Qing-era dispute among Catholic missionaries

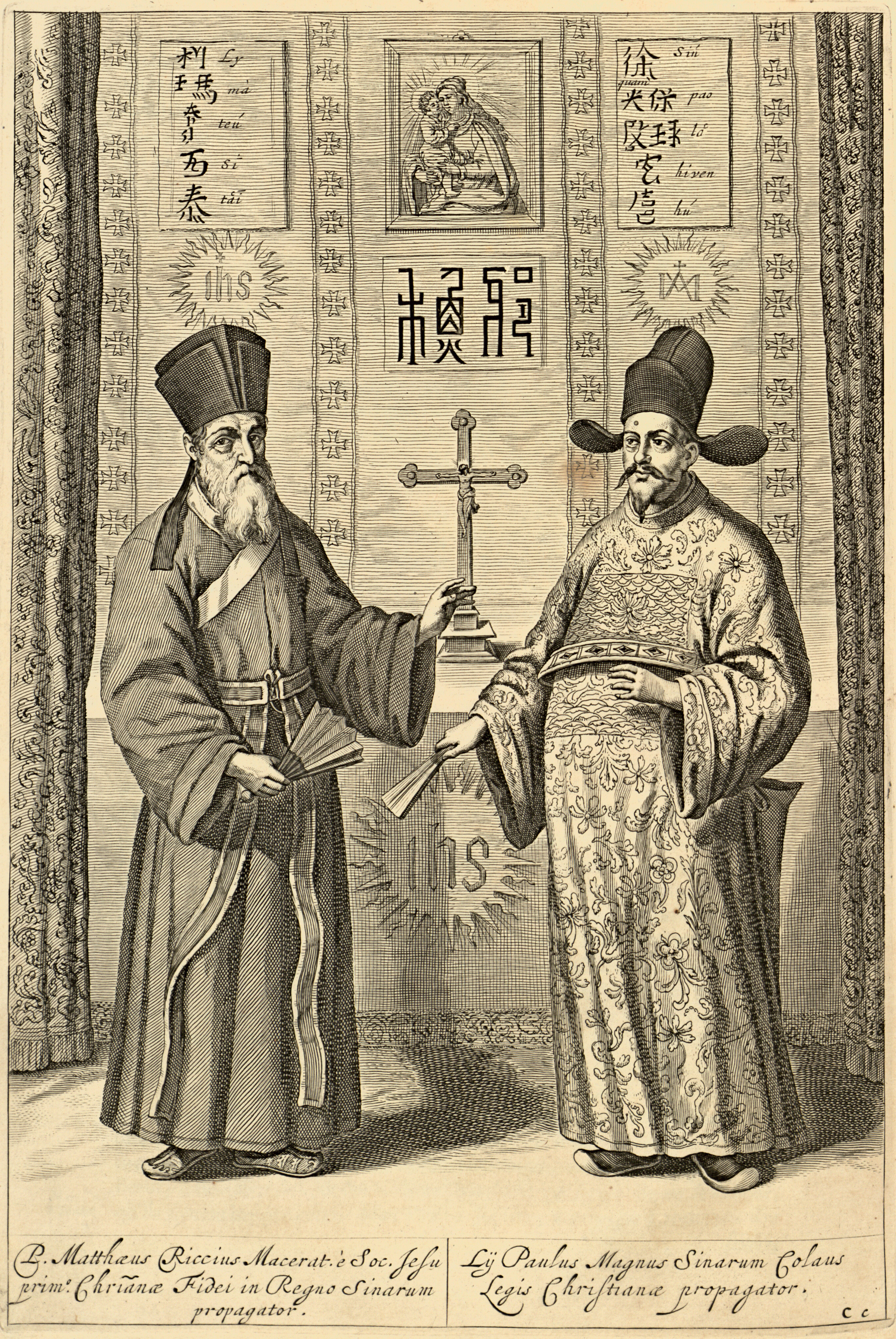
Matteo Ricci (left) and Xu Guangqi (right) in the Chinese edition of Euclid's Elements (Chinese: 幾何原本) published in 1670

The Chinese Rites controversy (simplified Chinese: 中国礼仪之争; traditional Chinese: 中國禮儀之爭; pinyin: Zhōngguó lǐyí zhī zhēng) was a dispute among Catholic missionaries over the religiosity of Confucianism and Chinese rituals during the 17th and 18th centuries. The debate discussed whether Chinese ritual practices of ancestor veneration and other formal rites qualified as religious, and thus incompatible with Catholic belief. The Jesuits argued that these Chinese rites were secular rituals that were compatible with Christianity, within certain limits, and should thus be tolerated. The Dominicans and Franciscans disagreed and reported the issue to Rome.

Rome's Sacred Congregation for the Propagation of the Faith sided with the Dominicans in 1645 by condemning the Chinese rites based on their brief. The same congregation sided with the Jesuits in 1656, thereby lifting the ban. It was one of the many disputes between the Jesuits and the Dominicans in China and elsewhere in Asia, including Japan and India. The conflict between the Jesuits and their opponents took on a historical dimension, with the former insisting that Europeans and the Chinese had a shared history, which was taken to legitimise the Jesuit "accommodation" of Chinese rites and names for the Christian God.

The controversy embroiled many European universities; the Kangxi Emperor and several popes, including Clement XI and Clement XIV, considered the case; the offices of the Holy See also intervened. Near the end of the 17th century, many Dominicans and Franciscans had shifted their positions in agreeing with the Jesuits' opinion, but Rome disagreed. Clement XI banned the rites in 1704. In 1742, Benedict XIV reaffirmed the ban and forbade debate.

In 1939, after two centuries, the Holy See re-assessed the issue. Pius XII issued a decree on 8 December 1939, authorizing Chinese Catholics to observe the ancestral rites and participate in Confucius-honoring ceremonies. The general principle of sometimes admitting native traditions even into the liturgy of the church, provided that such traditions harmonize with the true and authentic spirit of the liturgy, was proclaimed by the Second Vatican Council (1962–65).

== Background ==
=== Early adaptation to local customs ===
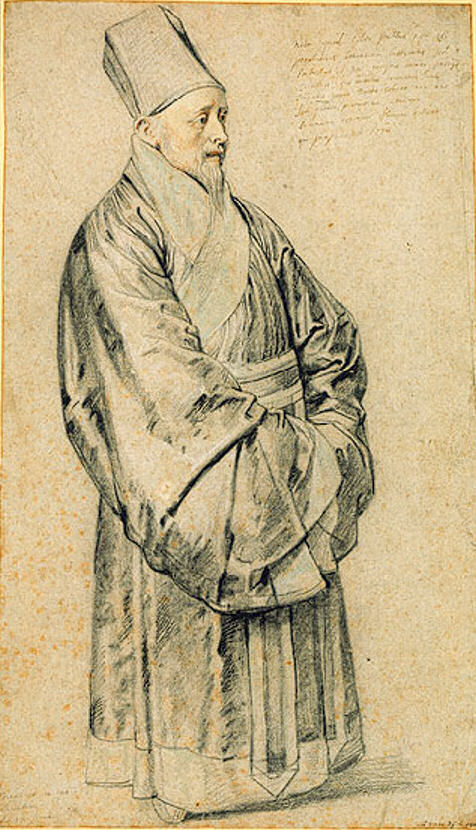
The Jesuits of the Jesuit China missions made efforts to adopt Chinese customs. Here Nicolas Trigault (1577–1628) in Chinese costume, by Peter Paul Rubens.

Unlike the American landmass, which had been conquered by military force by Spain and Portugal, European missionaries encountered in Asia united, literate societies that were as yet untouched by European influence or national endeavor.

Alessandro Valignano, Visitor of the Society of Jesus in Asia, was one of the first Jesuits to argue, in the case of Japan, for an adaptation of Christian customs to the societies of Asia, through his Résolutions and Cérémonial.

=== Matteo Ricci's policy of accommodation ===
In China, Matteo Ricci reused the Cérémonial and adapted it to the Chinese context. At one point the Jesuits even started to wear the gown of Buddhist monks, before adopting the more prestigious silk gown of Chinese literati. In particular, Matteo Ricci's Christian views on Confucianism and Chinese rituals, often called the "Directives of Matteo Ricci" (Chinese: 利瑪竇規矩), were followed by Jesuit missionaries in China and Korea.

In a decree signed on 23 March 1656, Pope Alexander VII accepted practices "favorable to Chinese customs", reinforcing 1615 decrees which accepted the usage of the Chinese language in liturgy, a notable exception to the contemporary Latin Catholic discipline which had generally forbidden the use of local languages.

In the 1659 instructions given by the Sacred Congregation for the Propagation of the Faith (known as the Propaganda Fidei) to new missionaries to Asia, provisions were clearly made to the effect that adapting to local customs and respecting the habits of the countries to be evangelized was paramount:

Do not act with zeal, do not put forward any arguments to convince these peoples to change their rites, their customs or their usages, except if they are evidently contrary to the religion [i.e., Catholic Christianity] and morality. What would be more absurd than to bring France, Spain, Italy or any other European country to the Chinese? Do not bring to them our countries, but instead bring to them the Faith, a Faith that does not reject or hurt the rites, nor the usages of any people, provided that these are not distasteful, but that instead keeps and protects them.

— Extract from the 1659 Instructions, given to Mgr François Pallu and Mgr Lambert de la Motte of the Paris Foreign Missions Society by the Sacred Congregation for the Propagation of the Faith.

=== Reception in China ===
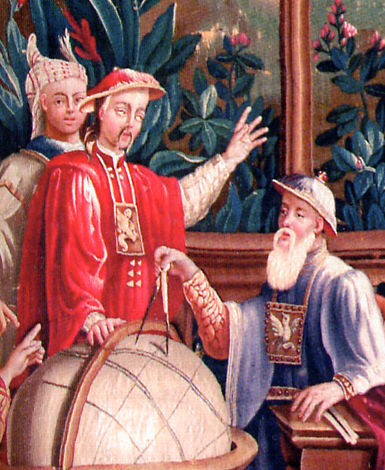
The Kangxi Emperor with a Jesuit astronomer, Adam Schall. "Tapisserie de Beauvais", 1690–1705.

The Jesuit order was successful in penetrating China and serving at the Imperial court. They impressed the Chinese with their knowledge of astronomy and mechanics, and in fact ran the Imperial Observatory. The Kangxi Emperor was at first friendly to the Jesuit Missionaries working in China. Their accurate methods allowed him to successfully predict eclipses, one of his ritual duties. He was grateful for the services they provided to him, in the areas of astronomy, diplomacy and artillery manufacture. Jesuit translators Jean-François Gerbillon and Thomas Pereira took part in the negotiations of the Treaty of Nerchinsk in 1689, where they assisted with translation. The Jesuits made an important contribution to the Empire's military, with the diffusion of European artillery technology, and they directed the castings of cannons of various calibers. The Kangxi Emperor also retained several Jesuits in his court as scientists and artists. By the end of the seventeenth century, the Jesuits had made many converts. They in turn were impressed by the knowledge and intelligence of the Han Chinese Confucian scholar elite, and adapted to their ancient Chinese intellectual lifestyle.

In 1692, Kangxi issued an edict of toleration of Christianity (容敎令 or 正敎奉傳).

The Europeans are very quiet; they do not excite any disturbances in the provinces, they do no harm to anyone, they commit no crimes, and their doctrine has nothing in common with that of the false sects in the empire, nor has it any tendency to excite sedition ... We decide therefore that all temples dedicated to the Lord of heaven, in whatever place they may be found, ought to be preserved, and that it may be permitted to all who wish to worship this God to enter these temples, offer him incense, and perform the ceremonies practiced according to ancient custom by the Christians. Therefore let no one henceforth offer them any opposition.

This edict enabled Christianity to be perceived by the state with "positive neutrality" and acceptable in the eyes of Confucian orthodoxy.

== Controversy ==
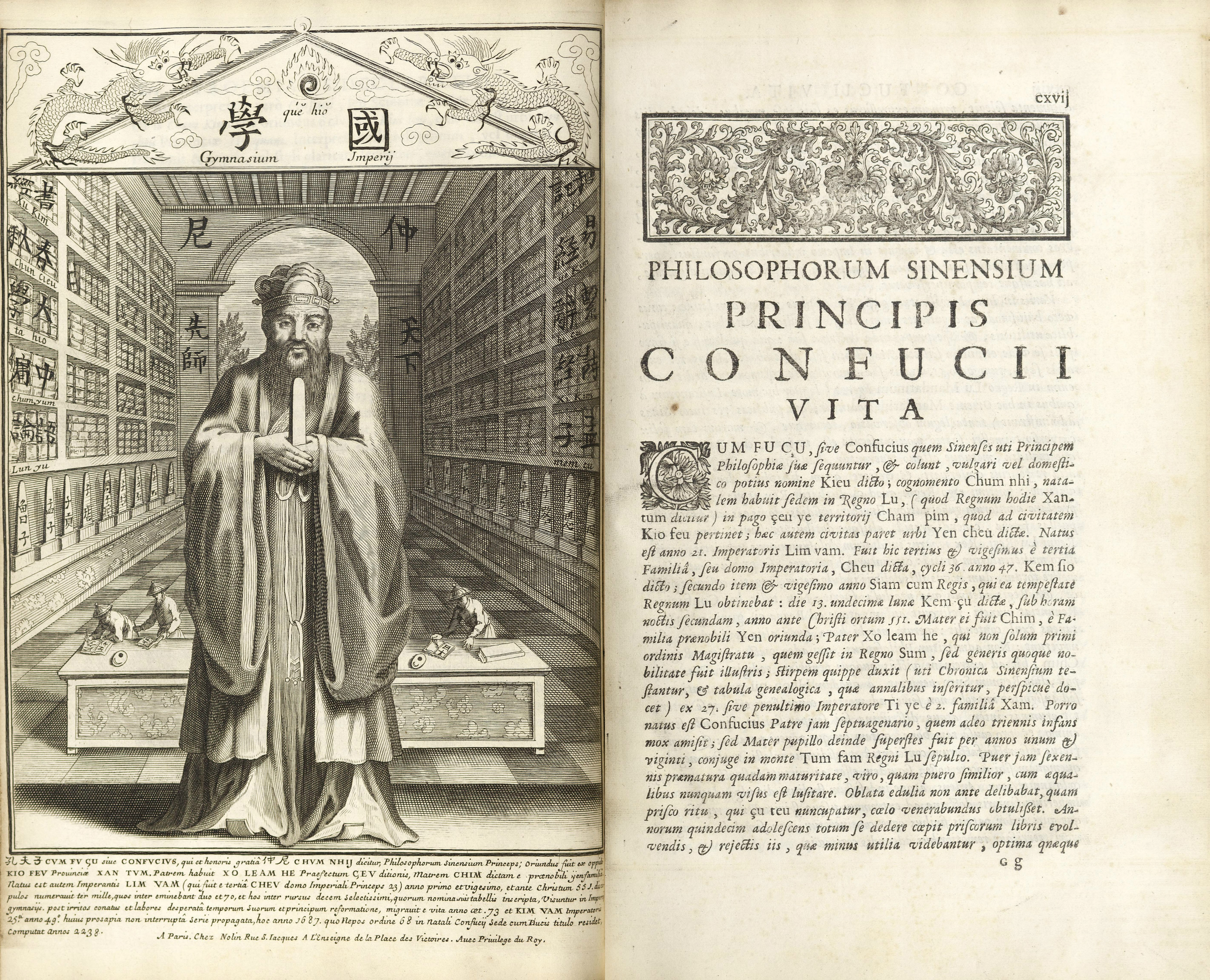
Confucius, Philosopher of the Chinese, or, Chinese Knowledge Explained in Latin, compiled by Philippe Couplet and three other Jesuits and printed at Paris in 1687

The Jesuits gradually developed and adopted a policy of accommodation on the issue of Chinese rites. The Chinese scholar elite were attached to Confucianism, and while Buddhism and Daoism were in decline and losing patronage, Confucianism was arguably at its golden age during this period of Chinese history; even the rich urban class of merchants pursued it. Despite this, all three provided the framework of both state and home life. Both Confucian and Taoist practices involved veneration of one's ancestors.

Besides the Jesuits, other religious orders such as the Dominicans, Franciscans, and Augustinians started missionary work in China during the 17th century, often coming from the Spanish colony of the Philippines. Contrary to the Jesuits, they refused any adaptation to local customs and wished to apply in China the same tabula rasa principle they had applied in other places, and were horrified by the practices of the Jesuits. In his famous anti-Jesuit polemic, the Provincial Letters, Blaise Pascal used the rites controversy as an example of what he considered the unprincipled and lax morality of the Jesuits.

They ignited a heated controversy and brought it to Rome. They raised three main points of contention:

- Determination of the Chinese word for "God", which was generally accepted as 天主 Tiānzhǔ (Lord of Heaven), while Jesuits were willing to allow Chinese Christians to use 天 Tiān (Heaven) or 上帝 Shàngdì (Lord Above/Supreme Emperor)
- Prohibition of Christians from participating in the seasonal rites for Confucius.
- Prohibition of Christians from using of tablets with the forbidden inscription "site of the soul" (靈位), and from following the Chinese rites for the ancestor worship.

In Rome, the Jesuits tried to argue that these "Chinese Rites" were civic rituals, rather than religious, and that converts should be allowed to continue to participate. They maintained that Chinese folk religion and offerings to the emperor and departed ancestors were civil in nature and therefore not incompatible with Catholicism, while their opponents argued that these kinds of worship were an expression of native religion and thus incompatible with Catholic beliefs.

== Pope Clement XI's decree ==
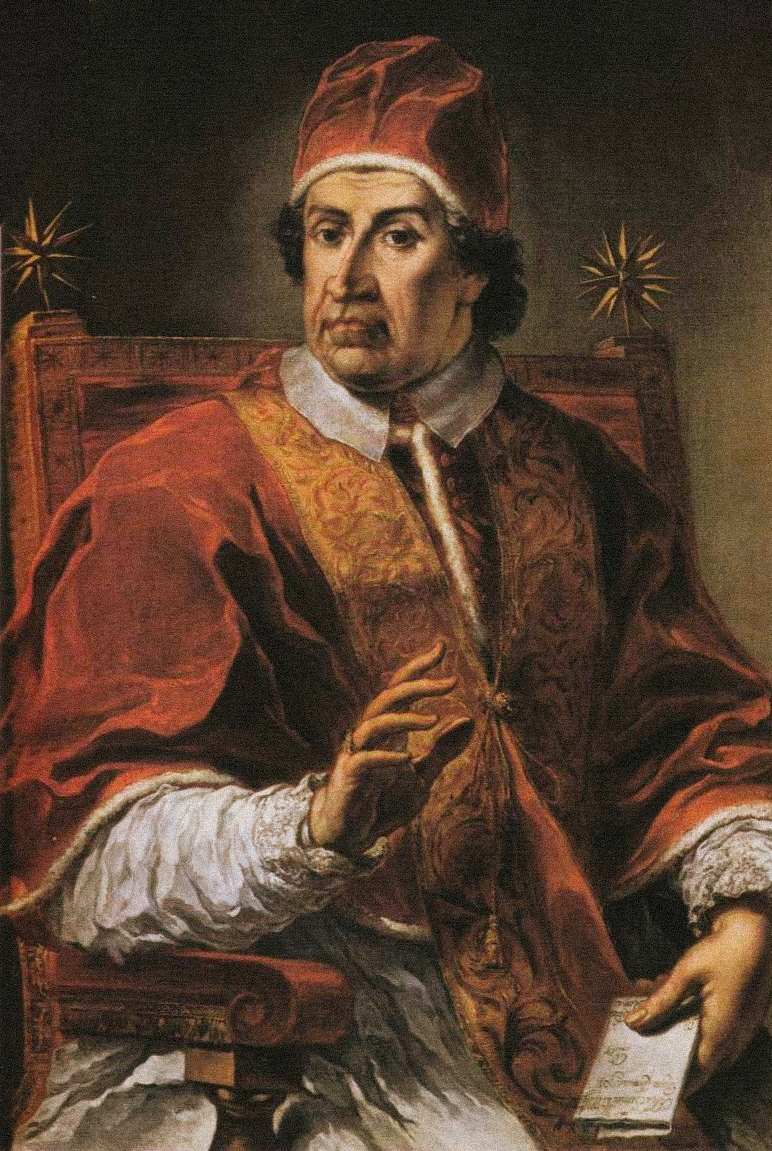
Pope Clement XI, depicted here by Pier Leone Ghezzi in 1708

Pope Clement XI condemned the Chinese rites and Confucian rituals, and outlawed any further discussion in 1704, with the anti-rites decree Cum Deus optimus of 20 November 1704. It forbade the use of Tiān and Shàngdì, while approving Tiānzhǔ (Lord of Heaven).

In 1705, Clement sent a legate to the Kangxi Emperor to communicate the interdiction of Chinese rites. The mission, led by Charles-Thomas Maillard De Tournon, communicated the prohibition of Chinese rites in January 1707, but as a result was banished to Macao.

Clement issued the bull Ex illa die on 19 March 1715, which officially condemned the Chinese rites:

Pope Clement XI wishes to make the following facts permanently known to all the people in the world ...

I. The West calls Deus [God] the creator of Heaven, Earth, and everything in the universe. Since the word Deus does not sound right in the Chinese language, the Westerners in China and Chinese converts to Catholicism have used the term "Heavenly Lord" (Tiānzhǔ) for many years. From now on such terms as "Heaven" [Tiān] and "Shàngdì" should not be used: Deus should be addressed as the Lord of Heaven, Earth, and everything in the universe. The tablet that bears the Chinese words "Reverence for Heaven" should not be allowed to hang inside a Catholic church and should be immediately taken down if already there.

II. The spring and autumn worship of Confucius, together with the worship of ancestors, is not allowed among Catholic converts. It is not allowed even though the converts appear in the ritual as bystanders, because to be a bystander in this ritual is as pagan as to participate in it actively.

III. Chinese officials and successful candidates in the metropolitan, provincial, or prefectural examinations, if they have been converted to Roman Catholicism, are not allowed to worship in Confucian temples on the first and fifteenth days of each month. The same prohibition is applicable to all the Chinese Catholics who, as officials, have recently arrived at their posts or who, as students, have recently passed the metropolitan, provincial, or prefectural examinations.

IV. No Chinese Catholics are allowed to worship ancestors in their familial temples.

V. Whether at home, in the cemetery, or during the time of a funeral, a Chinese Catholic is not allowed to perform the ritual of ancestor worship. He is not allowed to do so even if he is in company with non-Christians. Such a ritual is heathen in nature regardless of the circumstances.

Despite the above decisions, I have made it clear that other Chinese customs and traditions that can in no way be interpreted as heathen in nature should be allowed to continue among Chinese converts. The way the Chinese manage their households or govern their country should by no means be interfered with. As to exactly what customs should or should not be allowed to continue, the papal legate in China will make the necessary decisions. In the absence of the papal legate, the responsibility of making such decisions should rest with the head of the China mission and the Bishop of China. In short, customs and traditions that are not contradictory to Roman Catholicism will be allowed, while those that are clearly contradictory to it will not be tolerated under any circumstances.

Clement's decree was reiterated by Benedict XIV in the 1742 bull Ex quo singulari. Benedict demanded that missionaries in China take an oath forbidding them to discuss the issue again.

== Imperial ban and papal suppression ==
In the early 18th century, Rome's challenge to the Chinese Rites led to the expulsion of Catholic missionaries from China. In July 1706, the Papal Legate Charles-Thomas Maillard De Tournon angered the Kangxi Emperor, who issued an order that all missionaries, in order to obtain an imperial permit to stay in China, would have to declare that they would follow the rules of Matteo Ricci.

In 1721, the Kangxi Emperor disagreed with Clement's decree and banned Christian missions in China. In the Decree of Kangxi, he stated,

Reading this proclamation, I have concluded that the Westerners are petty indeed. It is impossible to reason with them because they do not understand larger issues as we understand them in China. There is not a single Westerner versed in Chinese works, and their remarks are often incredible and ridiculous. To judge from this proclamation, their religion is no different from other small, bigoted sects of Buddhism or Taoism. I have never seen a document which contains so much nonsense. From now on, Westerners should not be allowed to preach in China, to avoid further trouble.

Chinese converts were also involved in the controversy through letters of protest, books, pamphlets, etc. The Controversy debate was most intense between a group of Christian literati and a Catholic bishop (named Charles Maigrot de Crissey) in Fujian province, with the Chinese group of converts supporting the Jesuits and the bishop supported by less accommodating Iberian mendicants (Dominicans and Franciscans).

In 1724 the Yongzheng Emperor (r. 1722–1735) proscribed the Heavenly Lord sect (the name given to Catholicism during that period). Persecution steadily increased during the reign of the Yongzheng Emperor. While the Yongzheng Emperor appreciated and admired the Jesuit Giuseppe Castiglione's artwork and western technologies, he also reinforced anti-Christian policies in 1737.

== Pope Pius XII's decision ==
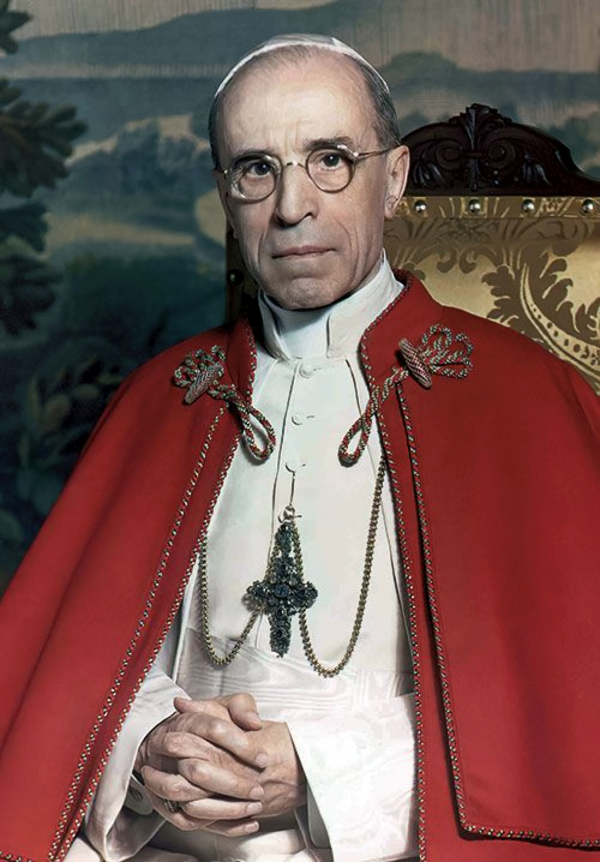
Pope Pius XII

The Rites controversy continued to hamper Church efforts to gain converts in China. In 1939, a few weeks after his election to the papacy, Pope Pius XII ordered the Congregation for the Evangelization of Peoples to relax certain aspects of Clement XI's and Benedict XIV's decrees. After the Apostolic Vicars had received guarantees from the Manchukuo Government that confirmed the mere "civil" characteristics of the so-called "Chinese rites", the Holy See released, on 8 December 1939, a new decree, known as Plane Compertum, stating:

It is abundantly clear that in the regions of the Orient some ceremonies, although they may have been involved with pagan rites in ancient times, have—with the changes in customs and thinking over the course of centuries—retained merely the civil significance of piety towards the ancestors or of love of the fatherland or of courtesy towards one's neighbors.

Overall, Plane Compertum asserted:

- Catholics are permitted to be present at ceremonies in honor of Confucius in Confucian temples or in schools;
- Erection of an image of Confucius or tablet with his name on is permitted in Catholic schools.
- Catholic magistrates and students are permitted to passively attend public ceremonies which have the appearance of superstition.
- It is licit and honorable to bow and otherwise demonstrate civil respect before the deceased or their images.
- The oath on the Chinese rites, which was prescribed by Benedict XIV, is not fully in accord with recent regulations and is superfluous. (Note: In the original text, this reads: Argumentis itaque hinc inde attente perpensis, prudentium atque experientium virorum sententia exquisita, iidem Emi Patres, quae sequuntur censuerunt esse declaranda : 1. Cum Sinense Gubernium pluries aperteque enuntiaverit omnibus esse liberum quam malint religionem profiteri et alienum esse a sua mente de rebus religiosis leges aut iussa edere; ideoque caeremonias, quae in honorem Confucii a publicis Auctoritatibus sive peraguntur sive iubentur, non fieri animo tribuendi religiosum cultum, sed hunc solum in finem ut foveatur et expromatur in virum clarissimum dignus honor et in traditiones patrum debitus cultus : licitum est catholicis adesse actibus honoris, qui ante Confucii imaginem vel tabellam, in monumentis confucianis vel in scholis perficiuntur. 2. Ideoque non habendum est illicitum imaginem Confucii, vel etiam tabellam eius nomine inscriptam, in scholis catholicis collocari, praesertim si Auctoritates id iusserint, aut eam capitis inclinatione salutare. Si quando timeatur scandalum, declaretur recta catholicorum intentio. 3. Tolerandum ut catholici magistratus et alumni, si publicis caeremoniis adsistere iubeantur quae speciem praeseferant superstitionis, intersint quidem, dummodo, ad mentem can. 1258, passive se habeant signaque illius tantum obsequii faciant, quod ut mere civile iure haberi possit; declarata, ut supra, sua intentione, si quando hoc necessarium apparuerit ad falsas interpretationes sui actus remo vendas. 4. Inclinationes capitis atque aliae civilis observantiae manifestationes ante defunctos vel defunctorum imagines, et etiam ante tabellam defuncti, simplici nomine inscriptam, uti licitae et honestae habendae sunt.)

According to Pope Pius XII's biographer, Jan Olav Smit, this meant that Chinese customs were no longer considered superstitious, but were an honourable way of esteeming one's relatives and therefore permitted by Catholic Christians. Confucianism was also thus recognized as a philosophy and an integral part of Chinese culture rather than as a heathen religion in conflict with Catholicism. Shortly afterwards, in 1943, the Government of China established diplomatic relations with the Vatican. The Papal decree substantially changed the ecclesiastical situation in China.

As the Church began to flourish, Pius XII established a local ecclesiastical hierarchy, and, on 18 February 1946, named Thomas Tien Ken-sin, who was from 18 July 1939 Apostolic Vicar of Qingdao, as the first Chinese national in the Sacred College of Cardinals and later that year – on 10 May 1946 – appointed him to the Archdiocese of Beijing.

== See also ==
- Ancestral hall
- Ancestral tablet
- Kirishitan
- Malabar rites
- Rite (Christianity)
- Ritual family
