= Charles-Thomas Maillard De Tournon =

Catholic cardinal (1668–1710)

His Eminence Charles-Thomas Maillard De Tournon
- Titular Patriarch of Antioch
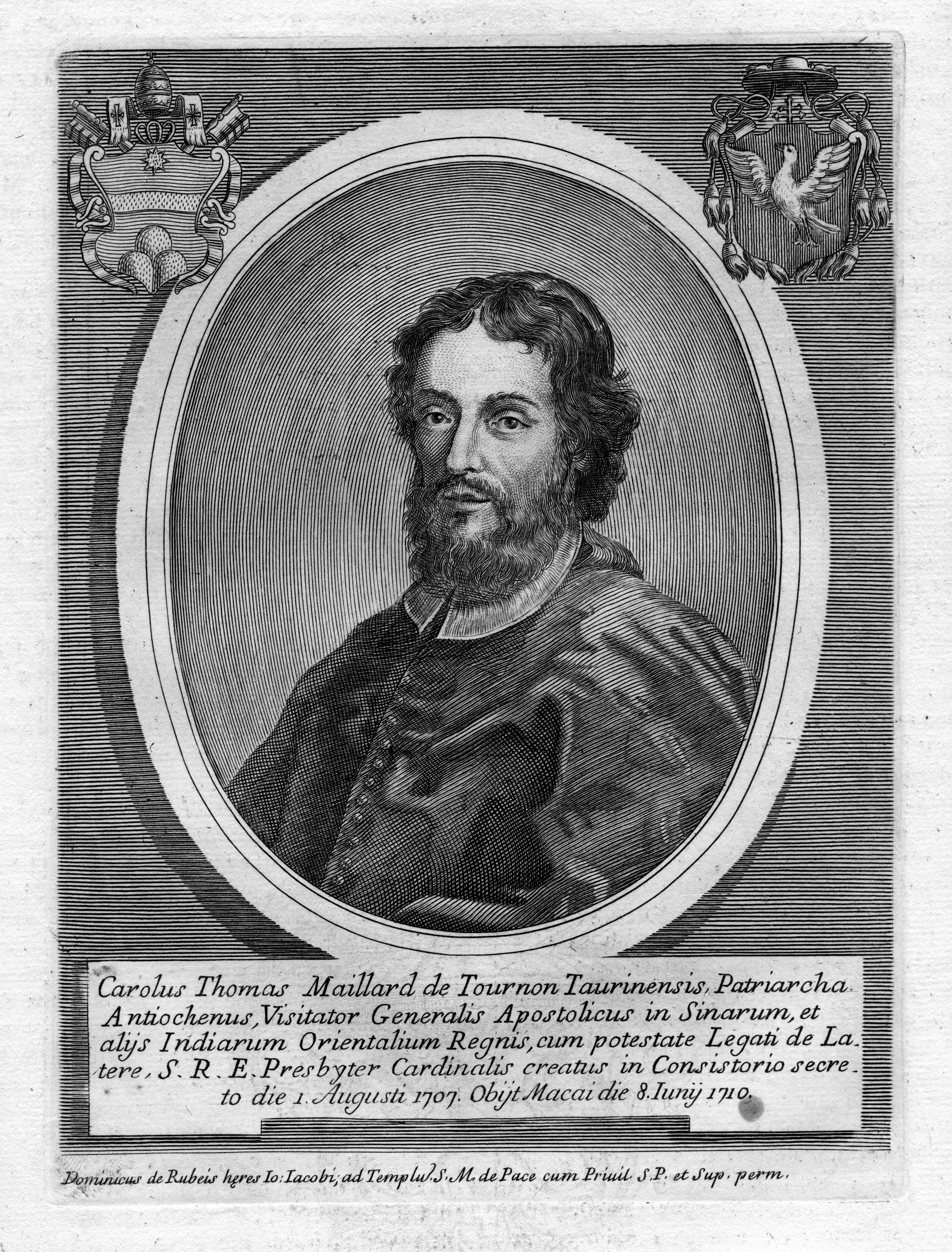
- Church: Roman Catholic
- In office: 1701–1710
- Predecessor: Michelangelo Mattei
- Successor: Giberto Bartolomeo Borromeo

Orders
- Ordination: 12 June 1695
- Consecration: 21 December 1701 by Pope Clement XI
- Created cardinal: 1 August 1707 by Pope Clement XI

Personal details
- Born: 21 December 1668 Turin, Duchy of Savoy
- Died: 8 June 1710 (aged 41) Macau

Charles-Thomas Maillard de Tournon (21 December 1668 – 10 June 1710) also known as Carlo Tommaso, was a cardinal and papal legate to the East Indies and China.

== Biography ==
Tournon was born of a noble Savoyard family at Turin on 21 December 1668; died in confinement at Macau, 8 June 1710.

Tournon studied at the Propaganda at Rome, and later taught there.

After graduating in canon and civil law; he went to Rome where he gained the esteem of Clement XI, who on 5 December 1701, appointed him legate a latere to the East Indies and the Qing Empire of China. The purpose of this legation was to establish harmony among the missionaries there; to provide for the needs of these extensive missions; to report to the Holy See on the general state of the missions, and the labours of the missionaries and to enforce the decision of the Holy Office against the further toleration of the so-called Chinese rites among the native Christians. In particular, he was sent to China to settle the question of whether Confucianism was an ethic system or a religion, thereby confirming if Christians could observe Confucian rituals. These rites consisted chiefly in offering sacrifices to Confucius and the ancestors, and in using the Chinese names Tiān (heaven) and Shàngdì (supreme emperor) for the God of the Christians. On 27 December 1701, the Pope consecrated Tournon bishop in the Vatican Basilica, with the title of Patriarch of Antioch.

The legate left Europe on the French royal vessel Maurepas on 9 February 1703, arriving at Pondicherry in India on 6 November 1703. On 23 June 1704, Tournon issued at this place the decree Inter graviores, summarily forbidding the missionaries under severe censures to permit the further practice of the Malabar rites.

On 11 July 1704, Tournon set sail for China by way of the Philippine Islands, arriving at Macau in China, 2 April, and at Beijing on 4 December 1705. He was the first papal legate to China. The Kangxi Emperor received him kindly at first, but upon hearing that he came to abolish the Chinese rites among the native Christians, he demanded from all missionaries on pain of immediate expulsion a promise to retain these rites. Many missionaries left China at this time.

At Rome, the Holy Office had meanwhile decided against the rites on 20 November 1704, and being acquainted with this decision, the legate issued a decree at Nanjing on 25 January 1707, obliging the missionaries under pain of excommunication latae sententiae to abolish these rites. Hereupon, the Kangxi Emperor ordered Tournon to be imprisoned at Macau and sent some Jesuit missionaries to Rome to protest against the decree. Tournon died in prison, shortly after being informed that he had been created cardinal on 1 August 1707.

Upon the announcement of his death at Rome, Clement XI highly praised him for his courage and loyalty to the Holy See and ordered the Holy Office to issue a Decree (25 September 1710) approving the acts of the legate. Tournon's remains were brought to Rome by his successor, Carlo Ambrogio Mezzabarba, and buried in the church of the Propaganda Fide on 27 September 1723.

== See also ==
- Chinese Rites controversy
- Dioceses of Saint Thomas of Mylapore

== Essential bibliography ==
- Crescimbeni, Giovan Mario (1774). "Ristretto della vita del Cardinal Carlo Tommaso Maillard de Tournon, Torinese," in Le vite degli arcadi illustri, III, Roma 1714, pp. 1-19.
- Dell'Oro, Giorgio (1998). "Oh quanti mostri si trovano in questo nuovo mondo venuti d'Europa: vita e vicissitudini di un ecclesiastico piemontese tra Roma e Cina: Carlo Tommaso Maillard de Tournon 1668-1710," in: Annali di storia moderna e contemporanea, 1998, anno IV, n. 4.
- Di Fiore, Giacomo, “Maillard de Tournon, Carlo Tommaso” in Dizionario Biografico degli Italiani, Vol. 67, ediz. Istituto Treccani, Roma, 2007. (in Italian)
- Jenkins Robert C., The Jesuits in China, David Nutt, London 1894.
- Malatesta, E.J. (1994). '"A fatal clash of wills: the condemnation of the Chinese rites by the papal legate Carlo Tommaso Maillard de Tournon," in: Monumenta Serica, monograph series, XXXIII (1994), pp. 211-245.
- Ott, Michael, "Charles-Thomas Maillard de Tournon," in The Catholic Encyclopedia, Vol. 15, New York, 1912.
- Passionei, Domenico [attributed] (1761)Memorie storiche della legazione e morte dell'eminentiss. Monsignor cardinale di Tournon esposte con munumenti rari ed autentici non piu dati alla luce. Venezia, 1761-1762, in 8 volumes. (in Italian)
- Rouleau, Francis A. S.J., "Maillard de Tournon Papal Legate at the Court of Peking, the first imperial audience (31 December 1705)" in Archivum Historicum Societatis Iesu, Vol. XXXI, Romae, Institutum Historicum Societatis Jesu, 1962, pp. 264- 321.
