= Carabus batangicoides =

Scientific classification
- Kingdom: Animalia
- Phylum: Arthropoda
- Class: Insecta
- Order: Coleoptera
- Suborder: Adephaga
- Family: Carabidae
- Genus: Carabus
- Species: C. batangicoides

Binomial name
- Carabus batangicoides Deuve & Tian, 2011

Species of beetle

Carabus batangicoides is a species of ground beetle in the Carabinae subfamily that is endemic to Sichuan, China.
