= Cardinal de Tournon =

Cardinal de Tournon may refer to:

- Charles-Thomas Maillard De Tournon (1668–1710), Papal legate to India and China and Cardinal
- François de Tournon (1489–1562), French Augustinian diplomat and Cardinal
