= S. M. Shirokogoroff =

Russian anthropologist (1887–1939)

- С. М. Широкогоров
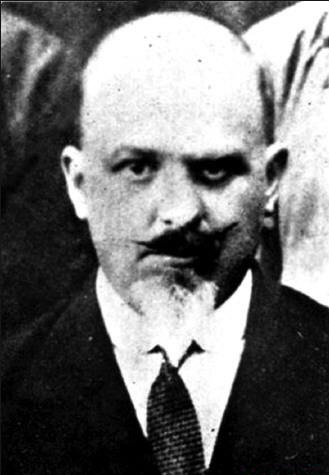
- Shirokogoroff in 1929
- Born: 1 July 1887; Suzdal, Russian Empire
- Died: 19 October 1939 (aged 52); Beijing, Japanese-occupied China

Academic background
- Education: University of Paris

Sergei Mikhailovich Shirokogorov (Russian: Сергей Михайлович Широкогоров; Chinese: 史祿國; pinyin: Shǐ Lùguó, 1 July 1887 – 19 October 1939) was a Russian anthropologist. A White émigré, he lived in China from 1922 until his death.

== Early life and education ==
Shirokogoroff was born in Suzdal. He went to France in 1906 to study at the University of Paris (Sorbonne) and then the École d'anthropologie. He returned to Russia in 1910 to enter the Natural Sciences Department of the Saint Petersburg University, but pursued other interests including archaeology and then anthropology. Under the direction of Vasily Radlov he began studying the ethnography of the Tungusic peoples, participating in expeditions in northeast China and eastern Siberia.

== Career ==
In 1912, Shirokogoroff started his research of the ethnography of the Manchu people. As Manchus in most of China had by that time long been strongly Sinicized in their language and culture, Shirokogoroff went in 1915 to one of the most remote corner of the country, the Aigun district (now Heihe) on the Amur River, opposite Russia's Blagoveshchensk.

The Aigun area until recently had few Chinese settlers, and, despite the dislocations occasioned by the events of 1900, the Manchus there had largely preserved their language and distinct way of life. Shirokogoroff spent 18 months working with the Manchus there. In 1917-18, he complemented his Aigun field research with a study of the Manchus in Beijing, who had been living there in the Chinese environment since 1644.

With the outbreak of the Russian Civil War, Shirokogoroff first stayed in Vladivostok at the Far Eastern University. In 1922 he went to Shanghai on a business trip to get some of his works (including the Social organization of the Manchus) printed, but due to the fall of Vladivostok to the communists in 1922, remained in Shanghai as part of the city's Russian community.

Shirokogoroff joined the Academia Sinica's Ethnology section in 1928 under Cai Yuanpei, and along with his wife and Yang Qingkun did fieldwork among the Yi people of Yunnan. He also taught at Fu Jen Catholic University (which later moved to Taipei). Afterwards, he was the first (and for quite some time, only) anthropology professor at Tsinghua University.

Administratively, the status of anthropology was in flux for the first few years; the department began as "Sociology and Anthropology", then changed to "Sociology"; however, it was an "integral part of the department". He was the master's thesis advisor for Fei Xiaotong, who arrived at the university in 1933. Fei is best known for his association with Bronisław Malinowski, but Fei himself says that Shirokogoroff was more influential in his academic development. Another student of Shirokogoroff's at Tsinghua was Francis Hsu, who had a less favourable view of him, complaining years later of his "authoritarian" and "intimidating" personal style. Shirokogoroff also had rather poor relations with fellow expatriates Wilhelm Schmidt and Alfred Radcliffe-Brown.

== Works and legacy ==
Major works of Shirokogoroff's include Opyt izsli︠e︡dovanīi︠a︡ osnov shamanstva u tungusov «Опыт исследования основ шаманства у тунгусов» (1919); Ėtnos. Izsli︠e︡dovanīe osnovnykh print︠s︡ipov izmi︠e︡nenīi︠a︡ ėtnicheskikh i ėtnograficheskikh i︠a︡vlenīĭ «Этнос. Исследование основных принципов изменения этнических и этнографических явлений» (1923); Social Organisation of the Manchus («Социальная организация маньчжур») (1924); and Psychomental Complex of the Tungus (1935), the latter written directly in English.

Two texts of his were published in English, "Function of Folklore" and the "Science of Folklore", were published alongside Rupert Jameson's Three Lectures on Chinese Folklore, a pamphlet published by the North China Union Language School in the 1930s.

He left behind a manuscript of an Evenki dictionary, which his wife conveyed to Yasumoto Tokunaga (later of Kansai Gaidai University) in 1943. However this and other papers of Shirokogoroff's were lost during the Occupation of Japan when the United States Army, Japan took over the building of the Minzoku Kenkyūsho.

== Anthropology ==
S. M. Shirokogoroff said that the Chinese were a complex of anthropological types, and Shirokogoroff believed that the Chinese type was seen in the people of Manchuria and Korea.

== Selected works ==
- Shirokogorov, Sergei Mikhailovich (1979) [1929], Social Organization of the Northern Tungus, Shanghai: The Commercial Press Limited
- Shirokogorov, Sergei Mikhailovich (1924), Social Organization of the Manchus: A Study of the Manchu Clan Organization, Shanghai: Royal Asiatic society. North China branch
- Shirokogorov, Sergei Mikhailovich (1935), Psychomental Complex of the Tungus, London: Kegan, Paul, Trench, Trubner

== links ==
- Russian site with b.ibliographical listing and some personal photos
