= Tianzhu (Chinese name of God) =

Catholic Chinese translation for God

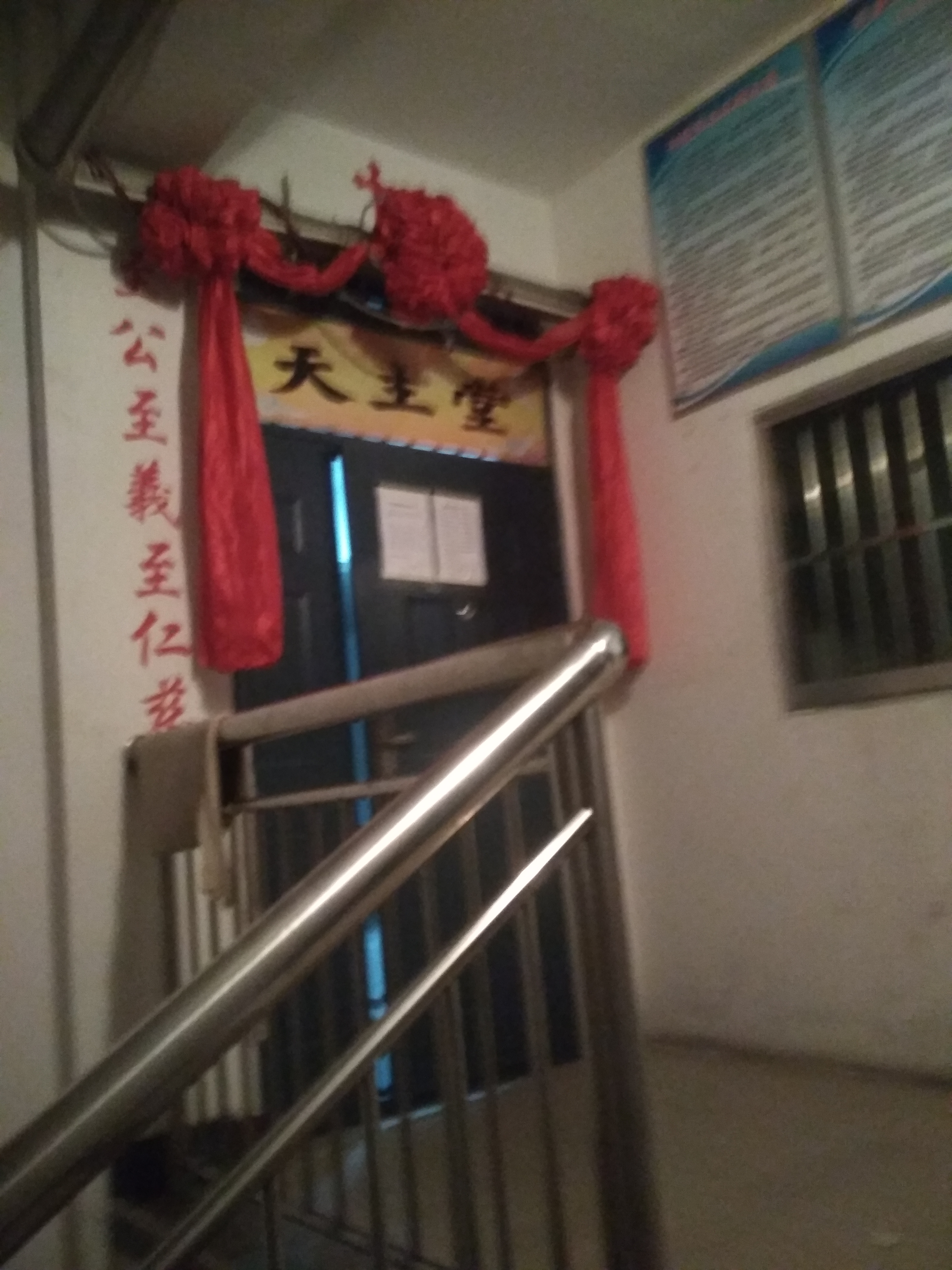
- Catholic church in Tai'an, with sign reading 天主堂 (tiānzhǔ táng, 'Hall of the Lord of Heaven')
- Chinese: 天主
- Literal meaning: Heaven Master
Transcriptions
Standard Mandarin
- Wade–Giles: Tʻien^{1}-chu^{3}
- IPA: [tʰjɛ́n.ʈʂù]
Wu
- Romanization: ^{1}thi-tsy
Yue: Cantonese
- Jyutping: tin^{1} zyu^{2}
Southern Min
- Hokkien POJ: Thian-chú

Tianzhu (Chinese: 天主; Wade–Giles: Tʻien-chu), meaning 'Heavenly Master' or 'Lord of Heaven', is the Chinese word used for God in Catholicism, designated by the Jesuit China missions.

== History ==
The word first appeared in Michele Ruggieri's Chinese translation of the Decalogo, or Ten Commandments. In 1584, Ruggieri and Matteo Ricci published their first catechism, Tiānzhǔ shílù (天主實錄, The Veritable Record of the Lord of Heaven). Matteo Ricci later wrote a catechism entitled Tiānzhŭ Shíyì (天主實義, The True Meaning of the Lord of Heaven).

Following the Chinese rites controversy, the term Tiānzhŭ was officially adopted by the Pope in 1715, who rejected alternative terms such as Tiān (天, "Heaven") and Shàngdì (上帝, "Supreme Emperor"). "Catholicism" is most commonly rendered as Tiānzhǔjiào (天主教, "Religion of the Lord of Heaven"). An individual Catholic is Tiānzhŭjiào tú; tú includes the meanings "disciple" and "believer." The same hanja characters are used in the Korean words for Catholicism and Catholic believer.

== See also ==
- Chinese rites controversy
- Names of God
- Names of God in China
- Shangdi
- Shen (Chinese religion)
- Tian
