= Rupert Jameson =

American folklorist (1895–1959)

- Born: August 15, 1895; Kingston, Tennessee, U.S.
- Died: September 30, 1959 (aged 64); Las Vegas, New Mexico, U.S.

Academic work
- Discipline: Chinese folklore

Rupert D. Jameson (August 15, 1895 – September 30, 1959) was an American folklorist and sinologist, best known for his work on the European discourse on the folklore of China. In 1925, he accepted the post of Professor of Literature at the National Tsing Hua University in Beijing.

== Early life ==
Rupert was the son of the Methodist minister Delroy Jameson who died soon after his birth. His mother Kate Jameson took responsibility for raising him alone, something she accomplished while also playing a pioneer role as a woman educationalist, becoming Dean of Women at Oregon State University, a position she held for nearly twenty years.

== Career in China ==
Jameson was a close associate with Charles Ogden and I. A. Richards and was more than familiar with their joint work, The Meaning of Meaning. I.A. Richards quotes Jameson in his 1934 work Coleridge on Imagination.
