= Oracula vivæ vocis =

Oracula vivæ vocis (singular: oraculum vivæ vocis) is a Latin term of Catholic canon law that refers to decisions of the pope or heads of the dicasteries that are made verbally. Literally the Latin refers to an "oracular out-voice," or an utterance of an oracle. They are immediately binding within the respective organizations to which they are directed, but are only binding externally after their existence has been proven.

It has been used particularly with regard to some popes' interactions with Society of Jesus, in which special privileges were granted but are preserved by word of mouth and, if memorialized, are done so only in secret archives.
