= Malabar rites =

Malabar rites is a conventional term for certain customs or practices of the natives of South India, especially Madurai, Mysore and the Carnatic, which the Jesuit missionaries in the early seventeenth century allowed their Indian neophytes to retain after conversion.

These rites were controversial among Catholics, with some figures criticizing them as idolatrous or superstitious, and others defending the character of the missionaries who established them. They were eventually prohibited by Rome.

== Background ==
Francis Xavier, a major force in establishing Catholic missions to India, described his efforts as meeting with intense opposition from "Brahmins and other noble castes inhabiting the interior". By the early seventeenth century, Catholicism was flourishing on the coasts of India, especially the western Malabar coast, but had not spread significantly inland. Gonsalvo Fernandes, a Portuguese Jesuit, obtained permission from the king to live in Madura and minister to the small number of Christians who had moved there from the coast, but after fourteen years of work he had not succeeded in making any new converts.

One obstacle to Fernandes's work was a local antipathy towards the Prangui, or Portuguese. The local Hindus disliked the Prangui for eating beef, drinking alcohol, and violating caste taboos, which Fernandes was known to do. This last especially made the Christianity he preached unacceptable to the higher castes.

== Innovations by Roberto de Nobili ==
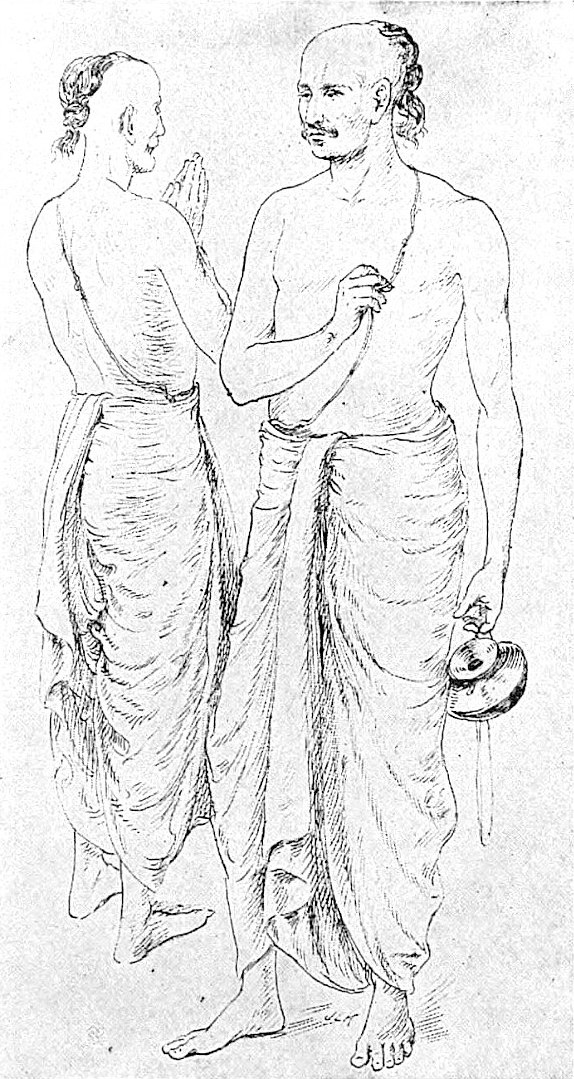
A Brahmin wearing the shikha and yajnopavita

Roberto de Nobili, a Jesuit missionary, departed for Southern India in 1604. In 1606, he joined his superior, the Provincial of Malabar, on a visit to Fernandes, where he observed the situation. In conference with his superiors, Archbishop Francisco Ros, and the provincial of Malabar, Nobili planned a fresh approach to Catholic missionary work in Southern India.

Nobili returned to Madura in the dress of a sannyasi, at first introducing himself as a Roman raja, and then as a Brahmin. He expressed the intent to live a life of prayer, penance, and study; avoiding contact with Fernandes, he took up a solitary residence in the Brahmins' quarter. There he lived on rice, milk, and herbs with water, speaking to Brahmin servants once a day but accepting no other visitors. He also engaged a Brahmin teacher, with whose help he studied Hindu texts in the original Sanskrit.

As Nobili's behavior aroused local curiosity, he gradually began to accept visitors, strictly observing the etiquette of the area in his interactions. Nobili impressed his interlocutors with his fluency in Tamil and his familiarity with Indian literature and poetry. Once he had established a good reception, he began to preach Catholicism, drawing on his knowledge of the Vedas for support in his philosophical arguments. By the end of 1608, several nobles and scholars had converted to Catholicism.

Nobili attempted to distinguish between cultural and religious customs of the area, requiring the new converts to abandon any practices which he believed to be superstitious or idolatrous, but allowing them to continue practices which he believed to be purely secular. In particular, the neophytes retained the dress of their individual castes, and continued to wear the bindi. Brahmin converts kept their shikha hairstyle; Nobili also allowed them to continue wearing the paduka (sandals) and yajnopavita (holy thread), but, due to the associated Hindu rituals, required that the objects be replaced with new ones that had received a Catholic blessing.

Nobili taught that Catholicism was one religion for all castes, but that it did not erase the distinctions between them. He instructed his neophytes that their duties of Christian charity extended to those of lower castes, but that visiting such people, interacting with them, or worshiping alongside them in church was supererogatory. He followed the same principle himself, avoiding publicly interacting with the lower castes, although he and his companions secretly ministered to the Paraiyars.

Despite meeting with significant success, Nobili also faced opposition, especially from Hindu religious leaders. His missionary work was frequently obstructed, and he was imprisoned and threatened with death. Nevertheless, by April 1609, his congregation had outgrown his small chapel, and Nobili wrote to his provincial superior asking for a companion to assist him in his ministry.

== Controversy and criticism ==
About this time, Fernandes sent a report to the Jesuit superiors in India and Rome. He accused Nobili of pretending to be a native; of allowing converts to continue idolatrous practices; and of causing a schism by dividing the local Catholics into separate congregations by caste. Alarmed by these reports, the provincial of Malabar, the visitor of the India Missions, and the Jesuit superior general in Rome all wrote to Nobili, warning him about his behavior. Robert Bellarmine, a relative of Nobili, also wrote to him in 1612, expressing grief at the news of his conduct.

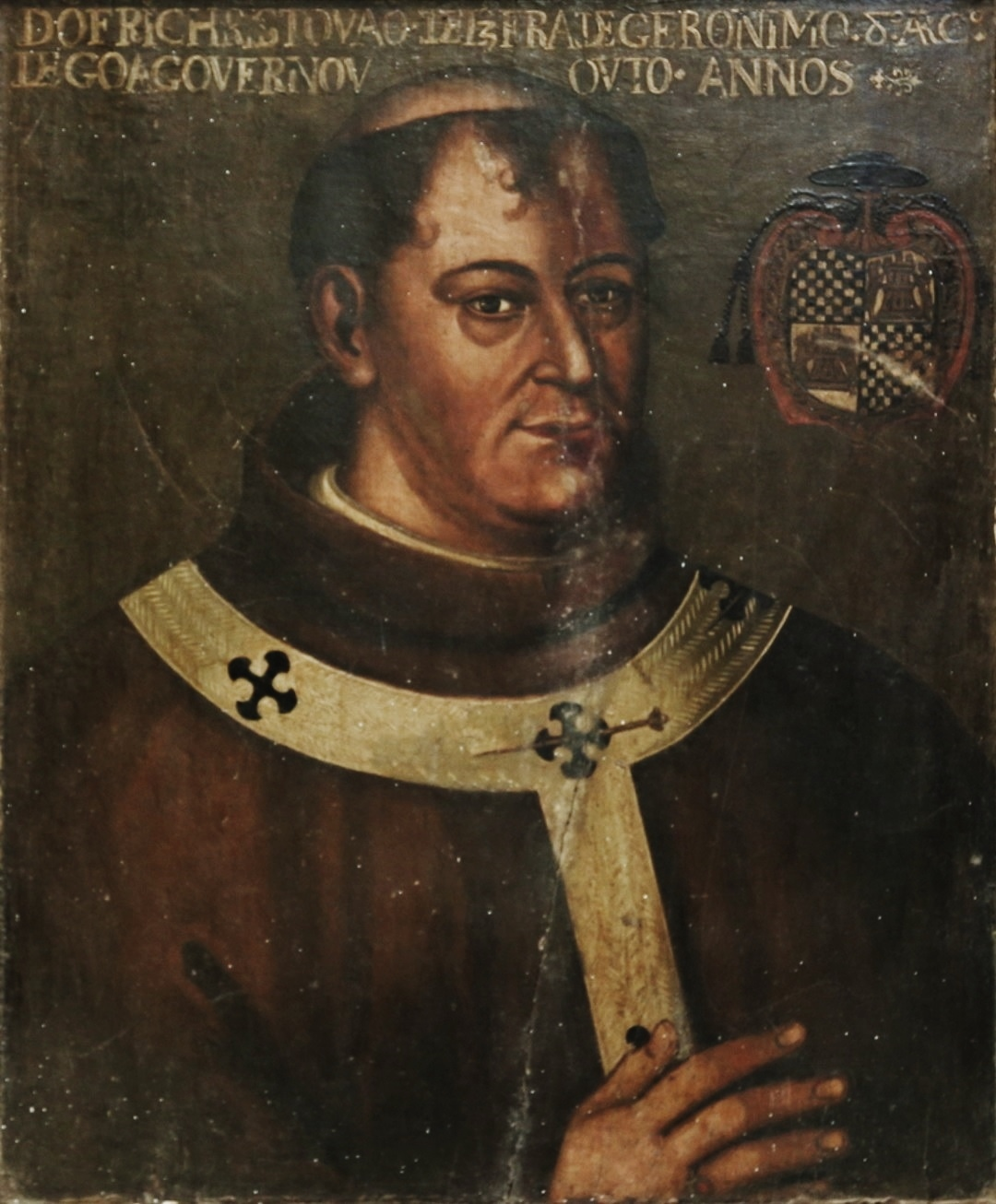
Cristóvão de Sá e Lisboa, archbishop of Goa, Nobili's major critic in India

Nobili argued against Fernandes's accusations in assemblies at Cochin and Goa, and sent a lengthy memoir to Rome defending himself. He protested that the customs he allowed his converts to keep had no religious meaning, citing Hindu texts to support his claims. One hundred and eight Brahmins signed the document to endorse his interpretation. Nobili acknowledged that the practices had historically been associated with Hinduism, but protested that they were now fully secularized, writing,

"These ceremonies belong to the mode, not to the substance of the practices; the same difficulty may be raised about eating, drinking, marriage, etc., for the heathens mix their ceremonies with all their actions. It suffices to do away with the superstitious ceremonies, as the Christians do."

Nobili also denied having caused a schism, arguing that he had approval from Ros to found separate churches for different castes, and that his neophytes were polite to those of Fernandes. He also protested that separation by caste in the churches was an established practice on the coast, and that even in Europe congregations were often segregated by social standing. Ros continued to support Nobili, arguing in his defense at Goa and Rome. The Archbishop of Goa, Alexis de Menezes, initially banned the use of the yajnopavita in the Synod of Diamper, but was eventually convinced to support Nobili. The only major opponent of Nobili then remaining in India was Cristóvão de Sá e Lisboa.

In 1614 and 1615, Bellarmine and the superior general wrote again to Nobili, accepting his arguments and declaring themselves satisfied. On 31 January 1623, Gregory XV issued the apostolic letter Romanae Sedis Antistes, ruling provisionally in favor of Nobili. The letter decreed that, until further notice, the converts could continue to wear the shikha, the yajnopavita, and the paduka, and perform certain bathing rituals. Those who did so were required to adhere to certain conditions, intended to firmly separate the practices from any Hindu associations. Regarding the segregated churches, Gregory wrote that "we earnestly entreat and beseech" (etiam atque etiam obtestamur et obsecramus) the castes to worship together, but did not issue a strict order requiring it.

== Further developments ==
In the year 1638, there were at Tiruchirapalli (Trichinopoly) several hundred Christian pariahs, who had been secretly taught and baptized by the companions of Nobili. About this time he devised a means of assisting more directly the lower castes, without ruining the work begun among the higher.

Besides the Brahmin saniassy, there was another grade of Hindu ascetics, called pandaram, enjoying less consideration than the Brahmins, but who were allowed to deal publicly with all castes. They were not excluded from relations with the higher castes. On the advice of Nobili, the superiors of the mission with the Archbishop of Cranganore resolved that henceforward there should be two classes of missionaries, the Brahmin and the pandaram. Father Balthasar da Costa was the first, in 1640, who took the name and habit of pandaram, under which he effected a large number of conversions, of others as well as of pariahs. Nobili had then three Jesuit companions.

After the comforting decision of Rome, Nobili hastened to extend his preaching beyond the town of Madura, and the Gospel spread by degrees over the whole interior of South India. In 1646, exhausted by forty-two years of toiling and suffering, he was constrained to retire, first to Jafnapatam in Ceylon, then to Mylapore, where he died 16 January 1656.

The superiors of the mission, writing to the General of the Society, about the middle and during the second half of the seventeenth century, record an annual average of five thousand conversions, the number never being less than three thousand a year even when the missioners' work was most hindered by persecution. At the end of the seventeenth century, the total number of Christians in the mission, founded by Nobili and still named Madura mission, though embracing, besides Madura, Mysore, Marava, Tanjore, Gingi, etc., is described as exceeding 150,000. Yet the number of the missionaries never went beyond seven, assisted however by many native catechists.

The Madura mission belonged to the Portuguese assistance of the Society of Jesus, but it was supplied with men from all provinces of the Order. Thus, for example, Father Beschi (c. 1710–1746), who won respect from the Hindus, heathen and Christian, for his writings in Tamil, was an Italian, as the founder of the mission had been. In the last quarter of the seventeenth century, the French Father John Venantius Bouchet worked for twelve years in Madura, chiefly at Trichinopoly, during which time he baptized about 20,000 infidels. The catechumens, in these parts of India, were admitted to baptism only after a long and a careful preparation. Indeed, the missionary accounts of the time bear frequent witness to the very commendable qualities of these Christians, their fervent piety, their steadfastness in the sufferings they often had to endure for religion's sake, their charity towards their brethren, even of lowest castes, their zeal for the conversion of pagans. In the year 1700 Father Bouchet, with a few other French Jesuits, opened a new mission in the Karnatic, north of the River Kaveri. Like their Portuguese colleagues of Madura, the French missionaries of the Karnatic were very successful, in spite of repeated and almost continual persecutions by the idolaters. Moreover, several of them became particularly conspicuous for the extensive knowledge they acquired of the literature and sciences of ancient India. From Father Coeurdoux the French Academicians learned the common origin of the Sanskrit, Greek, and Latin languages; to the initiative of Nobili and to the endeavours of his followers in the same line is due the first disclosure of a new intellectual world in India. The first original documents, enabling the learned to explore that world, were drawn from their hiding-places in India, and sent in large numbers to Europe by the same missionaries. But the Karnatic mission had hardly begun when it was disturbed by the revival of the controversy, which the decision of Gregory XV had set at rest for three quarters of a century.

== The Decree of Tournon ==
This second phase, which was much more eventful and noisy than the first, originated in Pondicherry. Since the French had settled at that place, the spiritual care of the colonists was in the hands of the Capuchin Fathers, who were also working for the conversion of the natives. With a view to forwarding the latter work, the Bishop of Mylapore or San Thome, to whose jurisdiction Pondicherry belonged, resolved, in 1699, to transfer it entirely to the Jesuits of the Karnatic mission, assigning to them a parochial church in the town and restricting the ministry of the Capuchins to the European immigrants, French or Portuguese. The Capuchins were displeased by this arrangement and appealed to Rome. The petition they laid before the Pope, in 1703, embodied not only a complaint against the division of parishes made by the Bishop, but also an accusation against the methods of the Jesuit mission in South India. Their claim on the former point was finally dismissed, but the charges were more successful. On 6 November 1703, Charles-Thomas Maillard de Tournon, a Piedmontese prelate, Patriarch of Antioch, sent by Clement XI, with the power of legatus a latere, to visit the new Christian missions of the East Indies and especially China, landed at Pondicherry. Being obliged to wait there eight months for the opportunity of passing over to China, Tournon instituted an inquiry into the facts alleged by the Capuchins. He was hindered through sickness, as he himself stated, from visiting any part of the inland mission; in the town, besides the Capuchins, who had not visited the interior, he interrogated a few natives through interpreters; the Jesuits he consulted rather cursorily, it seems.

Less than eight months after his arrival in India, he considered himself justified in issuing a decree of vital import to the whole of the Christians of India. It consisted of sixteen articles concerning practices in use or supposed to be in use among the neophytes of Madura and the Karnatic; the legate condemned and prohibited these practices as defiling the purity of the faith and religion, and forbade the missionaries, on pain of heavy censures, to permit them any more. Though dated 23 June 1704, the decree was notified to the superiors of the Jesuits only on 8 July, three days before the departure of Tournon from Pondicherry. During the short time left, the missionaries endeavoured to make him understand on what imperfect information his degree rested, and that nothing less than the ruin of the mission was likely to follow from its execution. They succeeded in persuading him to take off orally the threat of censures appended, and to suspend provisionally the prescription commanding the missionaries to give spiritual assistance to the sick pariahs, not only in the churches, but in their dwellings.

== Examination of the Malabar Rites at Rome ==
Tournon's decree, interpreted by prejudice and ignorance as representing, in the wrong practices if condemned, the real state of the India missions, affords to this day a much-used weapon against the Jesuits. At Rome it was received with reserve. Clement XI, who perhaps overrated the prudence of his zealous legate, ordered, in the Congregation of the Holy Office, on 7 January 1706, a provisional confirmation of the decree to be sent to him, adding that it should be executed "until the Holy See might provide otherwise, after having heard those who might have something to object". And meanwhile, by an oraculum vivae vocis granted to the procurator of the Madura mission, the pope decree, "in so far as the Divine glory and the salvation of souls would permit". The objections of the missionaries and the corrections they desired were propounded by several deputies and carefully examined at Rome, without effect, during the lifetime of Clement XI and during the short pontificate of his successor Innocent XIII. Benedict XIII grappled with the case and even came to a decision, enjoining "on the bishops and missionaries of Madura, Mysore, and the Karnatic " the execution of Tournon's decree in all its parts (12 December 1727). Yet it is doubted whether that decision ever reached the mission, and Clement XII, who succeeded Benedict XIII, commanded the whole affair to be discussed anew. In four meetings held from 21 January to 6 September 1733, the cardinals of the Holy Office gave their final conclusions upon all the articles of Tournon's decree, declaring how each of them ought to be executed, or restricted and mitigated. By a Brief dated 24 August 1734, pope Clement XII sanctioned this resolution; moreover, on 13 May 1739, he prescribed an oath, by which every missionary should bind himself to obeying and making the neophytes obey exactly the Brief of 24 August 1734.

Many hard prescriptions of Tournon were mitigated by the regulation of 1734. As to the first article, condemning the omission of the use of saliva and breathing on the candidates for baptism, the missionaries, and the bishops of India with them, are rebuked for not having consulted the Holy See previously to that omission; yet, they are allowed to continue for ten years omitting these ceremonies, to which the Hindus felt so strangely loath. Other prohibitions or precepts of the legate are softened by the additions of a Quantum fieri potest, or even replaced by mere counsels or advices. In the sixth article, the taly, "with the image of the idol Pulleyar", is still interdicted, but the Congregation observes that "the missionaries say they never permitted wearing of such a taly". Now this observation seems pretty near to recognizing that possibly the prohibitions of the rather overzealous legate did not always hit upon existing abuses. And a similar conclusion might be drawn from several other articles, e.g. from the fifteenth, where we are told that the interdiction of wearing ashes and emblems after the manner of the heathen Hindus, ought to be kept, but in such a manner, it is added, "that the Constitution of Gregory XV of 31 January 1623, Romanae Senis Antistes, be observed throughout". By that Constitution, as we have already seen, some signs and ornaments, materially similar to those prohibited by Tournon, were allowed to the Christians, provided that no superstition whatever was mingled with their use. Indeed, as the Congregation of Propaganda explains in an Instruction sent to the Vicar Apostolic of Pondicherry, 15 February 1792, "the Decree of Cardinal de Tournon and the Constitution of Gregory XV agree in this way, that both absolutely forbid any sign bearing even the least semblance of superstition, but allow those which are in general use for the sake of adornment, of good manners, and bodily cleanness, without any respect to religion".

The most difficult point retained was the twelfth article, commanding the missionaries to administer the sacraments to the sick pariahs in their dwellings, publicly. Though submitting dutifully to all precepts of the Vicar of Christ, the Jesuits in Madura could not but feel distressed, at experiencing how the last especially, made their apostolate difficult and even impossible amidst the upper classes of Hindus. At their request, Benedict XIV consented to try a new solution of the knotty problem, by forming a band of missionaries who should attend only to the care of the pariahs. This scheme became formal law through the Constitution "Omnium sollicitudinum", published 12 September 1744. Except this point, the document confirmed again the whole regulation enacted by Clement XII in 1734. The arrangement sanctioned by Benedict XIV benefited greatly the lower classes of Hindu neophytes; whether it worked also to the advantage of the mission at large, is another question, about which the reports are less comforting. Be that as it may, after the suppression of the Society of Jesus (1773), the distinction between Brahmin and pariah missionaries became extinct with the Jesuit missionaries. Henceforth conversions in the higher castes were fewer and fewer, and nowadays the Christian Hindus, for the most part, belong to the lower and lowest classes. The Jesuit missionaries, when re-entering Madura in the 1838, did not come with the dress of the Brahmin saniassy, like the founders of the mission; yet they pursued a design which Nobili had also in view, though he could not carry it out, as they opened their college of Negapatam, now at Trichinopoly. A wide breach has already been made into the wall of Brahminic reserve by that institution, where hundreds of Brahmins send their sons to be taught by the Catholic missionaries. Within recent years, about fifty of these young men have embraced the faith of their teachers, at the cost of rejection from their caste and even from their family; such examples are not lost on their countrymen, either of high or low caste.

== Beatification issues ==
The process for the beatification of Father John de Britto was going on at Rome during the hottest period of the controversy over these "Rites", and the adversaries of the Jesuits asserted that beatification to be impossible because it would amount to approving the "superstitions and idolatries" maintained by the missioners of Madura. Still, the cause progressed, and Benedict XIV, on 2 July 1741, declared "that the rites in question had not been used, as among the Gentiles, with religious significance, but merely as civil observances, and that therefore they were no obstacle to bringing forward the process".
