= Shangdi =

Chinese view of a supreme Deity

- Supreme Deity
- Shang oracular script graphs for 帝 Dì, the supreme Deity as the celestial pole.
- Other names: Di; Tian
- Hanji: 上帝
- Venerated in: Religious Confucianism; Chinese folk religion
- Abode: Sky
- Gender: Male
- Region: China
- Ethnic group: Chinese
- Temples: Temple of Heaven
- Associated deities: Tian

Genealogy
- Dynasty: Shang

Equivalents
- Zhou dynasty: Tian
- Taoist: Yudi Shangdi
- Tagalog: Bathala
- Korean: Haneunim
- Aryan: Indra

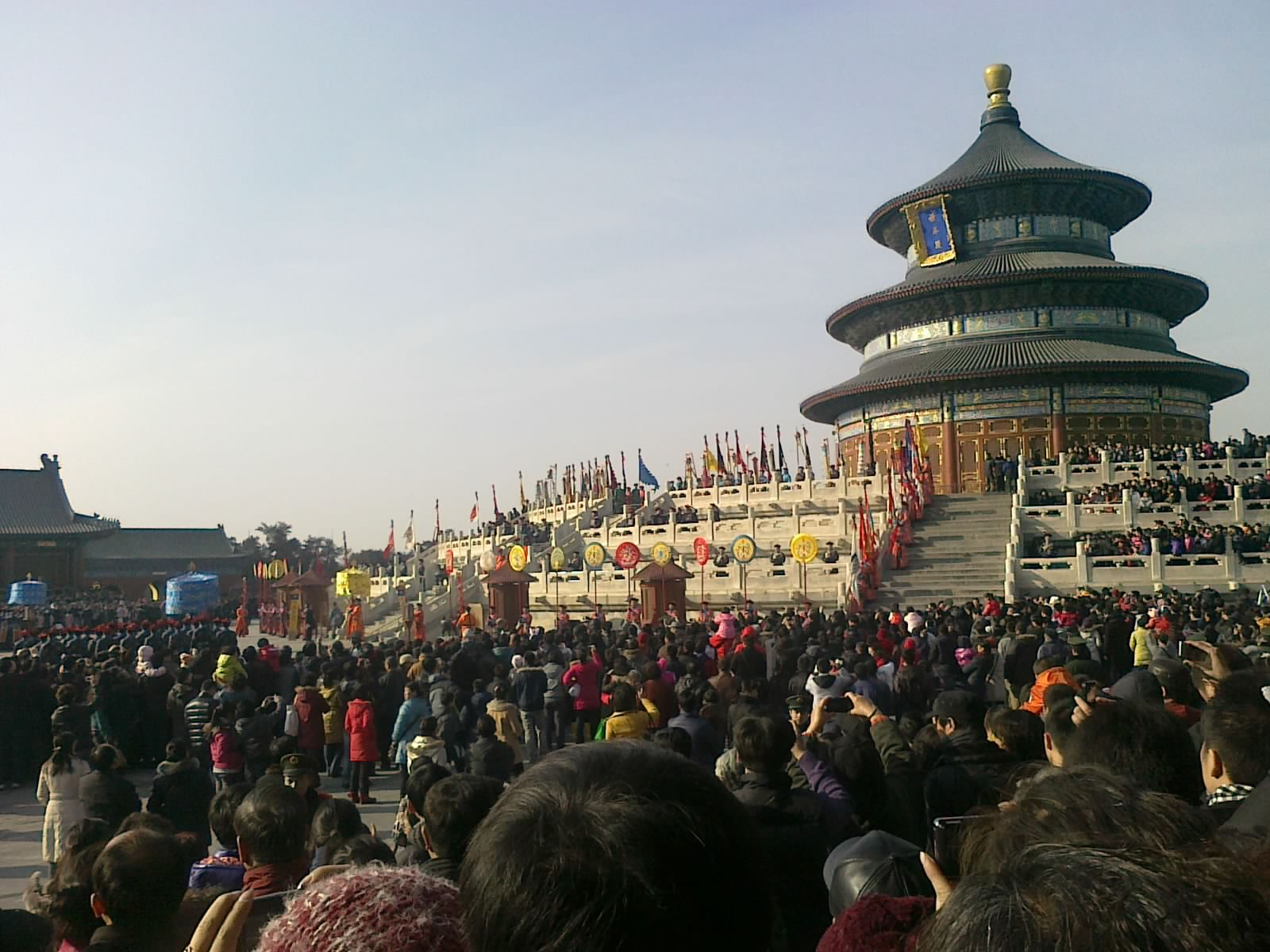
Annual Sacrifice to Heaven (祭天 jìtiān) in honour of the Highest Deity the Heavenly Ruler (皇天上帝 Huángtiān Shàngdì) is held at the Temple of Heaven in Beijing. State pomp and a variety of Confucian religious groups contributed to the revival of worship of the Highest Deity in the 2000s.

Shangdi (Chinese: 上帝; pinyin: Shàngdì; Wade–Giles: Shang^{4} Ti^{4}), also called simply Di (Chinese: 帝; pinyin: Dì; lit. 'Lord'), is the name of the Chinese Highest Deity or "Lord Above" in the theology of the classical texts, especially deriving from Shang theology and finding an equivalent in the later Tiān ("Heaven" or "Great Whole") of Zhou theology.

The Western Zhou version of the character "Tian". J. C. Didier identified the squared shape to be the same square found at the very central core of Shangdi, thus illustrating a strong connection (and identification) between the two deities.

Although the use of "Tian" to refer to the absolute Deity of the universe is predominant in Chinese religion today, "Shangdi" continues to be used in a variety of traditions, including certain philosophical schools, certain strains of Chinese Buddhism, Taoism, Confucianism, some Chinese salvationist religions (notably Yiguandao) and Chinese Protestant Christianity. In addition, it is commonly used by contemporary Chinese (both mainland and overseas) and by religious and secular groups in East Asia, as a name of a singular universal deity and as a non-religious translation for God in Abrahamic religions.

== Etymology ==
Shang oracular script graphs for 帝 Dì, the supreme God as the celestial pole.

"Shang Di" is the pinyin romanization of two Chinese characters. The first – 上, Shàng – means "high", "highest", "first", "primordial"; the second – 帝, Dì – is typically considered as shorthand for huangdi (皇帝) in modern Chinese, the title of the emperors of China first employed by Qin Shi Huang, roughly some 2200 years ago, and is usually translated as "emperor". The word itself is derived from Three "Huang" and Five "Di", including Yellow Emperor (Chinese: 黃帝; pinyin: Huangdi), the mythological originator of the Chinese civilization and the ancestor of the Chinese race. However, 帝 refers to the High God of Shang, thus means "deity" (manifested god). Thus, the name Shangdi should be translated as "Highest Deity", but also has the implied meaning of "Primordial Deity" or "First Deity" in Classical Chinese. The deity preceded the title and the emperors of China were named after him in their role as Tianzi, the sons of Heaven. In the classical texts the highest conception of the heavens is frequently identified with Shang Di, who is described somewhat anthropomorphically. He is also associated with the pole star. The conceptions of the Supreme Ruler (Shang Di) and of the Sublime Heavens (Chinese: 皇天; Wade–Giles: Huang-t'ien) afterward coalesce or absorb each other.

=== Shang dynasty usage ===
The Shang pronunciation of "Di" is reconstructed as *têks. The Shang dynasty designed 23 versions of Di, all based on a common pattern and shape. The word finds itself in many inscriptional contexts, including use in collocation with natural spirits or addressing ancestral deities. There was a type of offerings named "Di-sacrifice", designed for hosting Di's representatives.

== Religious roles ==
=== Shang dynasty ===
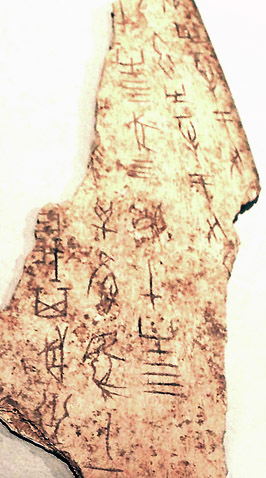
Oracle bone script, the earliest known form of Chinese.

The earliest references to Shangdi are found in oracle bone inscriptions of the Shang dynasty in the 2nd millennium BC, although the later work Classic of History claims yearly sacrifices were made to him by Emperor Shun, even before the Xia dynasty.

Shangdi was regarded as the ultimate spiritual power by the ruling elite of the Huaxia during the Shang dynasty: he was believed to control victory in battle, success or failure of harvests, weather conditions such as the floods of the Yellow River, and the fate of the capital city and kingdom. Shangdi seems to have ruled a hierarchy of other gods controlling nature, as well as the spirits of the deceased. These ideas were later mirrored or carried on by the Taoist Jade Emperor and his celestial bureaucracy, and Shangdi was later syncretized with the Jade Emperor.

Shangdi was probably more transcendent than immanent, only working through lesser gods. Shangdi was considered too distant to be worshiped directly by ordinary mortals. Instead, the Shang kings proclaimed that Shangdi had made himself accessible through the souls of their royal ancestors, both in the legendary past and in recent generations as the departed Shang kings joined him in the afterlife. The kings could thus successfully entreat Shangdi directly. Many of the oracle bone inscriptions record these petitions, usually praying for rain but also seeking approval from Shangdi for state action.

Shangdi was seen as somewhat human or at least anthropomorphic and the "greatest ancestor" by some worshippers during this time.

=== Zhou dynasty ===
In the later Shang and Zhou dynasties, Shangdi was conflated with Heaven (天, Tiān). The Duke of Zhou justified his clan's usurpation through the concept of the Mandate of Heaven, which proposed that the protection of Shangdi was not connected to their clan membership but by their just governance. Shangdi was not just a tribal but instead an unambiguously good moral force, exercising its power according to exacting standards. Shangdi's favor could thus be lost and even "inherited" by a new dynasty, provided they upheld the proper rituals.

Modern researches have paid attention to the adoption of Shang religious practices by the Zhou dynasty, and particularly, the continued worship of Shangdi through altered forms. Modern explanations are based on the parallel between Shang and Zhou adoptions. Historically, the regency of the Duke of Zhou sought to re-stabilize the Zhou dynasty. The Zhou court modeled their adoption after the Shang, whose imports of local cults as well as official worship of tribal deities played an important role in maintaining kingly sovereignty of the monarchs over subjugated polities. According to Ruth H. Chang, continuation of Shang religion also provided opportunities to further share changing religious activities the newly conquered Shang people. The Zhou dynasty aimed to make an impression that the term "Di" was native to them. These actions were perceived by Chang as a Zhou attempt at a similar cult adoption for the purpose of uniting Shang and Zhou under one political entity.

There were other reasons behind the Duke of Zhou's attempt in merging Di with the concept of Tian. Evidence from oracle bone inscriptions show that the Shang believed in Shangdi's blessings for the king, which some scholars interpreted as a belief in the ruler's granted authority by the gods. This belief was resonant with the theory of Tian, in that the monarch received divine authority to rule. Obedience of the Shang people was likely to be ensured by implementing a Zhou concept in which the Shang found similarities with their native beliefs.

The connection of many rituals with the Shang clan meant that Shang nobles continued to rule several locations (despite their rebellions) and to serve as court advisors and priests. The Duke of Zhou even created an entire ceremonial city along strict cosmological principles to house the Shang aristocracy and the nine tripods representing Huaxia sovereignty; the Shang were then charged with maintaining the Rites of Zhou. Likewise, the Shang's lesser houses, the shi knightly class, developed directly into the learned Confucian gentry and scholars who advised the Zhou rulers on courtly etiquette and ceremony. The Confucian classics carried on and ordered the earlier traditions, including the worship of Shangdi. All of them include references:

Occurrences of Shangdi in the Five Classics
Chinese name	Pinyin	English name	Occurrences
書經	Shujing	Classic of History	32 times
詩經	Shijing	Classic of Poetry	24 times
禮記	Liji	Classic of Rites	20 times
春秋	Chunqiu	Spring and Autumn Annals	8 times
易經	Yijing	Classic of Changes	2 times

The Four Books mention Shangdi as well but, as it is a later compilation, the references are much more sparse and abstract. Shangdi appears most commonly in earlier works: this pattern may reflect increasing rationalization of Shangdi over time, the shift from a known and arbitrary tribal god to a more abstract and philosophical concept, (Note: The Book of Documents says: "August Heaven has no partisan affections: it supports only the virtuous".) (Note: The Zuo zhuan says: "Unless one is virtuous, the people will not be in harmony and the spirits will not partake of one's offerings. What the spirits are attracted to is one's virtue".) or his conflation and absorption by other deities.

As early as the Western Zhou period, Di had become fully synonymous with Tian, as the two words were used interchangeably in various bronze inscriptions. One such situation appears in bronze castings during King Li of Zhou's reign (9th century BC), pointing out the prevalence of equating both words with each other.

=== Han dynasty ===
By the time of the Han dynasty, the influential Confucian scholar Zheng Xuan glossed: "Shangdi is another name for Heaven". Dong Zhongshu said: "Heaven is the ultimate authority, the king of gods who should be admired by the king". Usage of the word "Di" had significantly changed, and by the Han it had been used to refer to much more terms. In some cases, "Di" still denoted a high deity with a distinguished charge over celestial objects, but in others it was written in collocation with other words, incorporating the connotation of "god" to those concerned. "Di" featured in the name of the Yellow Emperor (Huangdi), the Flame Emperor (Yandi) and various other figures.

In later eras, he was commonly known by the name "Heavenly Ruling Highest Deity" (皇天上帝, Huángtiān Shàngdì) and, in this usage, he is especially conflated with the Taoist Jade Emperor.

== Identification ==
=== The Shang progenitor ===
In Shang sources, Di is already described as the supreme ordainer of the events which occur in nature, such as wind, lightning and thunder, and in human affairs and politics. All the gods of nature are conceived as his envoys or manifestations. Shang sources also attest his cosmological Five Ministries. Di, or Tian, as later texts explain, did not receive cult for being too remote for living humans to sacrifice to directly. Instead, an intermediary such as an ancestor was necessary to convey to Di the offerings of the living.

According to some prominent scholars, including Guo Moruo, Shangdi was originally identical to Ku (or Kui) or Diku ("Divus Ku"), the progenitor (first ancestor) of the Zi (子) lineage, the founders of the Shang dynasty, attested in the Shiji and other texts. According to this interpretation, this identification had profound political implications, because it meant that the earthly Shang kings were themselves by birth aspects of divinity.

Shang designated character for the high ancestor Shang Jia.

Further evidence from Shang sources suggests that there wasn't a complete identification between the two, as Di controls spirits of nature, while Kui does not; Di is frequently pictured sending down "approvals", while Kui is never so pictured; and Kui received cult, while Di did not. Moreover, Kui is frequently appealed in "horizontal" relationship with other powers, undermining any portrait of him as the apex of the pantheon.

Interpretations of Shang oracle bones yield the possibility of Di being equated with Shang Jia, the utmost and supreme being of the "Six Spirits" who were Predynastic Shang male ancestors. The bone graph for Shang Jia consists of a square encompassing a cross. Since the cross shape is understood to be "Jia", the square is therefore "Shang", indicating it to be the ancestral square that constitute Di's central core.

=== Shangdi as the celestial pole ===
David Pankenier has studied the astral connections of Shangdi, drawing on a view that interest in the sky was a focal character of the religious practices of the Shang, but also of the earlier Xia and Erlitou cultures. Especially intriguing is the fact that palatial and ceremonial structures of these cultures were carefully aligned to the celestial pole and the procession of pole stars. Pankenier notes that the true celestial pole lies in a sky template which is vacant of significant stars, and that the various pole stars are those nearest to this vacant apex which is of crucial importance.

He illustrates how the Shang oracular script for Di can be projected on the north pole template of the ancient sky in such a way that its extremity points correspond with the visible star, while the intersection of the linear axes at the centre will map to the vacant celestial pole. Pankenier argues that the supreme Di was identified with the celestial pole, an idea familiar in later stages of Chinese religion, linking with the Tàiyī 太一 ("Great One") fully documented as early as the 4th century BC.

The interpretation of Shangdi as the celestial pole, Taiyi and as Ku the progenitor of the Shang is not contradictory. Feng Shi argues that Ku and Di are indeed identical. The Shang probably deliberately identified their ancestor with a universal god recognized in different regions and local cultures in order to legitimize their power.

=== Multiplicity of Di ===
Shang characters for Shangdi, designed in three most frequently used versions. In all three cases, the central component of the character is a manifestation of the polar square which housed main-lineage Shang ancestors.

Inscriptions of the Shang dynasty point out the collective nature of Shangdi. The fact that the word "Di" was also used to address Shang ancestors show that Di was intimately related to the ancestral spirits. The Shang character for Di features a squared pattern, which was a symbol of the northern ecliptic pole. This square composes many Shang ancestral names, and it even denotes temples and altars dedicated to the foremost Shang predynastic ancestors. J. C. Didier pointed out that the central square of the word "Di" housed all main-lineage Shang ancestral spirits. These spirits represented Di's core of cosmic divinity and carry his will to bless the human world. "Di" also emcompasses non-ancestral deities that could be unfavorable towards living beings, a result of adopting foreign cults. These gods represent Di's authority to exercise control over disastrous events, contrary to "friendly" Shang ancestral square. Spirits were considered by the Shang to be consular spirits of Di, and often were given direct offerings as representations of the supreme deity.

Many inscriptions found on Shang bones and bronze indicate that Di's multiplicity could be further understood by interpreting the "Shang" in "Shangdi". Scholars argue that the "Shang" component illustrated the inequivalence between Di and Shangdi. Shangdi, according to them, was only a part of Di in the mind of the Shang people, and that there was presence of Shangdi's counterpart. Interpreting versions of the character "Di" in Shang texts, Didier found out that versions with two horizontal lines above the graph denoted "Shangdi", while those possessing three lines would connote a broader meaning of "Shangxiadi" (上下帝). This connotation appearing in Shang inscriptions reveal the multiplicity in which the deity was divided into superior (shang) and lesser ranks (xia). They argued that the adopted spirits which constitute Di's unfavorable actions to them living realm would, possibly, be housed in the lesser rank, or "Xiadi" (下帝), while the "friendly" ancestral spirits would compose the "Shangdi" as a counterpart.

=== Contemporary Confucianism ===
Contemporary Confucian theologians have emphasised differences between the Confucian idea of Shangdi, conceived as both transcendent and immanent, and act only as a governor of the world, and the Christian idea of God, which they conceived contrary to those of Christian as a deity that is completely otherworldly (transcendent) and is merely a creator of the world.

== Worship ==
=== Rituals ===
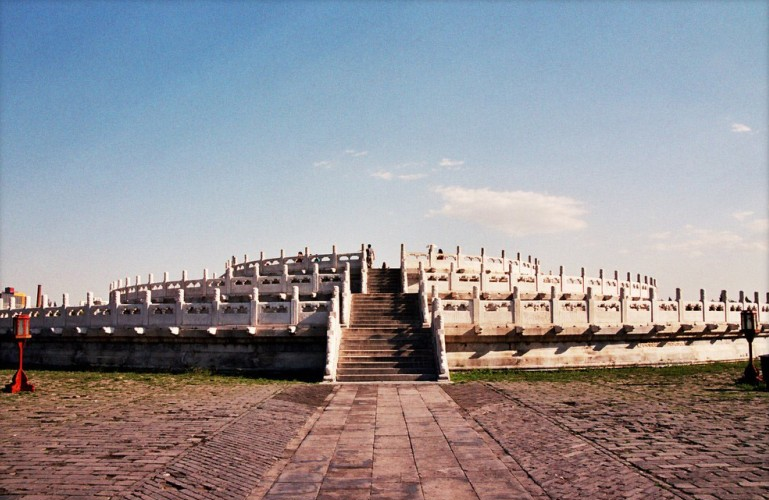
Sacred altar at the Temple of Heaven, Beijing

As mentioned above, sacrifices offered to Shangdi by the king are claimed by traditional Chinese histories to predate the Xia dynasty. The surviving archaeological record shows that by the Shang, the shoulder blades of sacrificed oxen were used to send questions or communication through fire and smoke to the divine realm, a practice known as scapulimancy. The heat would cause the bones to crack, and royal diviners would interpret the marks as Shangdi's response to the king. Inscriptions used for divination were buried in special orderly pits, while those for practice or records were buried in common middens after use.

During the Shang, it is observed that Di did not receive a direct cult. Instead, his consular spirits would manifest in the human world to be offered sacrifices. The Shang often identified these spirits as Di and sometimes performed a "Di-sacrifice" to them, illustrating intimate connections of the recipients with the being.

Under Shangdi or his later names, the deity received sacrifices from the ruler of China in every Chinese dynasty annually at a great Temple of Heaven in the imperial capital. Following the principles of Chinese geomancy, this would always be located in the southern quarter of the city. (Note: For instance, the Classic of History records the Duke of Zhou building an altar in the southern part of Luo.) During the ritual, a completely healthy bull would be slaughtered and presented as an animal sacrifice to Shangdi. (Note: Although the Duke of Zhou is presented as sacrificing two.) The Book of Rites states the sacrifice should occur on the "longest day" on a round-mound altar. The altar would have three tiers: the highest for Shangdi and the Son of Heaven; the second-highest for the sun and moon; and the lowest for the natural gods such as the stars, clouds, rain, wind, and thunder.

Shangdi is never represented with either images or idols. Instead, in the central building of the Temple of Heaven, in a structure called the "Imperial Vault of Heaven", a "spirit tablet" (神位, shénwèi) inscribed with the name of Shangdi is stored on the throne, Huangtian Shangdi (皇天上帝). During an annual sacrifice, the emperor would carry these tablets to the north part of the Temple of Heaven, a place called the "Prayer Hall for Good Harvests", and place them on that throne.

=== Conflation with singular universal God ===
It was during the Ming and Qing dynasties, when Roman Catholicism was introduced by Jesuit priest Matteo Ricci, that the idea of "Shangdi" started to be applied to the Christian conception of God.

While initially he utilized the term Tianzhu (天主; Tiānzhǔ, lit. "The Lord of Heaven"), Ricci gradually changed the translation to "Shangdi" instead. His usage of Shangdi was contested by Confucians, as they believed that the concept of Tian and "Shangdi" is different from that of Christianity's God: Zhōng Shǐ-shēng, through his books, stated that Shangdi only governs, while Christianity's God is a creator, and thus they differ. Ricci's translation also invited the displeasure of Dominicans and that of the Roman Curia: on March 19, 1715, Pope Clement XI released the Edict Ex Illa Die, stating that Catholics must use "Tianzhu" instead of "Shangdi" for Christianity's God.

When Protestantism entered China in the middle of the 19th century, the Protestant missionaries also encountered a similar issue: some preferred the term "Shangdi", while some preferred the term Shen ("god"). A conference held in 1877 in Shanghai, discussing the translation issue, also believed that "Shangdi" of Confucianism and the Christian concept of God are different in nature.

However, by the 20th century, most British missionaries, some Catholics, Chinese Orthodox Christians, and Evangelicals preferred "Shangdi" as a connection with Chinese native monotheism, with some furthering the argument by linking it with the unknown god as described in the Christian Bible. Catholics preferred to avoid it, due to compromises with the local authority in order to do their missions, as well as fear such translation may associate the Christian God to Chinese polytheism.

Nowadays, through the secular Chinese-language media, the Chinese words "Shangdi" and "Tian" are frequently used to translate the singular universal deity with minimal religious attachment to the Christian idea of God. At the same time, Confucians and intellectuals in contemporary mainland China and Taiwan attempt to realign the term to its original meaning. Catholics officially use the term Tianzhu, while Evangelicals typically use Shangdi and/or Shen (神, "god" or "spirit").

== See also ==
- Jade Emperor
- Yuanshi Tianzun
- Taiyi Tianzun
- Hongjun Laozu
- Tian
- Tao
- Chinese folk religion
- Chinese mythology
- Shen
- King of the gods
- Sky father

=== In other cultures and belief systems ===
- Śakra (in Buddhism)
- Haneullim (in Korea)
- Amenominakanushi (in Japan)
- Tengri (in Mongolia)
- Indra (in Vedism)
- Ông Trời (in Vietnam)
- Yahweh or Jehovah (referred as Allah ("the god") in Arabic) (in Abrahamic religions)
- Brahma
- Ishvara (in Hinduism)
