= Tian =

Chinese view of heaven

- Heaven
- Chinese Bronze script character for Tian.
- Other names

Chinese name
- Chinese: 天
- Literal meaning: heaven, nature
Transcriptions
Standard Mandarin
- Hanyu Pinyin: tiān
- Bopomofo: ㄊㄧㄢ
- Wade–Giles: t'ien^{1}
- IPA: [tʰi̯ɛn]
Wu
- Romanization: thi (T1)
Gan
- Romanization: tien^{1}
Yue: Cantonese
- Yale Romanization: tīn
- Jyutping: tin1
- IPA: [tʰin˥]
Southern Min
- Hokkien POJ: thiⁿ
Middle Chinese
- Middle Chinese: tʰen
Old Chinese
- Zhengzhang: /*qʰl'iːn/

Vietnamese name
- Vietnamese alphabet: thiên
- Chữ Hán: 天

Korean name
- Hangul: 천
- Hanja: 天
Transcriptions
- Revised Romanization: cheon

Japanese name
- Kanji: 天
- Kana: てん
Transcriptions
- Romanization: ten
- Venerated in: Religious Confucianism; Chinese folk religion
- Abode: Sky
- Gender: Male
- Region: China
- Ethnic group: Chinese
- Temples: Temple of Heaven
- Associated deities: Shangdi

Genealogy
- Dynasty: Zhou

Equivalents
- Shang dynasty: Shangdi

Tian (天) is one of the oldest Chinese terms for heaven or the cosmos and is a central concept in Chinese mythology, philosophy, and cosmology. During the Shang dynasty (17th–11th century BCE), the highest deity was referred to as Shangdi or Di (帝, "Lord"). In the subsequent Zhou dynasty, Tian became synonymous with this figure. Prior to the 20th century, the worship of Tian was considered an orthodox cosmic principle in China.

In Taoism and Confucianism, Tian is described in relation to its complementary aspect Dì (地), which is the term for Earth. Together, they were understood to represent the two poles of reality, with Humanity (人, rén) occupying the Earth realm.

Tian has had multiple meanings or roles attached to it. It was thought of as a supreme power over other gods and humans, a force that could bring order or catastrophe, destiny, a deity, or even a holy world or afterlife.

== Characters ==
Chinese Seal script for Tian 天 ("heaven")

Chinese Oracle script for Tian 天 ("heaven")

The modern Chinese character Tian (天) and its early seal script form combine dà 大 ("great; large") and yī 一 ("one"). However, some of the original characters in Shang oracle bone script and Zhōu bronzeware script depict an anthropomorphic figure with an enlarged head representing a "great person."

In oracle and bronze inscriptions, the ideogram for dà 大 portrays a stick figure with arms stretched outward, symbolizing "great" or "large." The corresponding forms of Tian 天 emphasize the cranium of this figure, represented either with a square or round head, or a head marked with one or two lines. Schuessler notes that some bronze graphs for Tian, depicting a person with a round head, resemble those for dīng 丁 (the "fourth Celestial stem"). He suggests that "the anthropomorphic graph may or may not indicate that the original meaning was 'deity' rather than 'sky'."

Two variant Chinese characters for Tian 天 are:

- 二人 (èr rén, "two humans"), written with 二 èr ("two") and 人 rén ("human").
- 靝, a Daoist coinage combining 青 qīng ("blue") and 氣 qi ("qi; vital energy"), used in the sense of "blue sky".

== Etymology ==
Reconstructions of Tian (天) in Middle Chinese (c. 6th–10th centuries CE) include t'ien, t'iɛn, tʰɛn > tʰian, and then. Reconstructions in Old Chinese (c. 6th–3rd centuries BCE) include t'ien, t'en, hlin, thîn, and l̥ˤin.

Schuessler links the etymology of Tian with the Turkic and Mongolian word tengri ("sky," "heaven," "deity"), as well as with Tibeto-Burman words such as taleŋ (Adi) and tǎ-lyaŋ (Lepcha), both meaning "sky" or "god". He also suggests a possible connection between Tian and diān 巔 ("summit, mountaintop") or diān 顛 ("summit, top of the head, forehead"), which share cognates such as Zemeic Naga tiŋ ("sky").

Other reconstructions of 天's Old Chinese pronunciation, such as *qʰl'iːn or *l̥ˤi[n] propose a voiceless lateral onset, either as a consonant cluster or a single consonant. Baxter and Sagart argue, based on dialectal differences in Eastern Han Chinese, as a phonetic component in phono-semantic compounds, and its role in transcribing foreign syllables, that around 200 CE 天 had two onsets: coronal *tʰ and dorsal *x. Both are thought to have derived from an earlier voiceless lateral *l̥ˤ. The further etymology remains uncertain. One proposal links transcriptions of the Xiongnu word for "sky," haak-lin (赫連), as related.

=== Compounds ===
Tian is a component in many Chinese compounds. Some notable examples include:

- Mandate of Heaven (Tiānmìng, 天命) – a concept of divine legitimacy for Chinese Dynasties.
- Heavenly Questions (Tiānwèn, 天問) – a section of the Chu Ci.
- Tiānzǐ (天子 "Son of Heaven") – an honorific title for the emperor
- All under heaven (Tiānxià, 天下)
- Tiāndì (天地, lit. 'heaven and earth') – meaning "the world; the universe"
- Xingtian (刑天) – a Chinese deity
- Tiānfáng (天房, lit. 'House of Heaven') – a Chinese name for the Kaaba, derived from Bayt Allah (Arabic: بَيْت ٱللَّٰه, lit. 'House of God').

== Chinese interpretations ==
In Confucianism and Taoism, the terms "Lord Heaven" and "Jade Emperor" were sometimes used for a supreme deity regarded as an anthropomorphized form of Tian, and in some interpretations these names were considered synonymous.

Tian was described as "the dwelling place of gods and other superhuman beings". It was also regarded as "the guardian of both the moral laws of mankind and the physical laws of nature... and is synonymous with the divine will."

In Chinese culture, heaven has often been associated with "order," serving as "the blueprint for creation," "the mandate by which earthly rulers govern," and "the standard by which to measure beauty, goodness, and truth."

During the Zhou dynasty, nobles made the worship of heaven a central part of their political philosophy. They viewed it as comprising "many gods" who embodied order, kingship, and the Mandate of Heaven.

=== Confucianism ===
Confucianism contains a religious dimension characterized by reverence for Heaven (Tian) and Earth (Dì), which were regarded as powers regulating the natural world and influencing human affairs. The concepts of yīn and yáng were considered integral to this relationship, extending to humanity and human institutions. In this worldview, the "cosmos" and its "principles" served as the standard to which human conduct should conform.

Historically and in the present, many Confucian scholars have used the I Ching to divine events through the transformations of Tian and other natural forces. Respect for Heaven and the natural world has also led some Confucian thinkers to adopt perspectives interpreted as environmentalist, emphasizing harmony between humanity and nature as a foundation of moral cultivation. Within this framework, harmony was regarded as "the basis for a sincere mind." The emperor, as Tiānzǐ ("Son of Heaven"), was traditionally central to Confucian political philosophy.

Mount Tai has been regarded as a sacred site in Confucianism and was traditionally the most important location where emperors offered sacrifices to Heaven and Earth.

==== Confucius ====
The concept of Tian was central in the teachings of Confucius. He expressed trust in Heaven and believed that it overruled human effort. He saw himself as fulfilling the will of Heaven, which, in his view, would not allow him to die before completing his mission. References to Heaven appear throughout the Analects, where Confucius described its attributes and authority.

Confucius honored Heaven as the supreme source of goodness:

The Master said, "Great indeed was Yao as a sovereign! How majestic was he! It is only Heaven that is grand, and only Yao corresponded to it. How vast was his virtue! The people could find no name for it. How majestic was he in the works which he accomplished! How glorious in the elegant regulations which he instituted!"

He also acknowledged personal dependence upon Heaven:

The Master said, "Wherein I have done improperly, may Heaven reject me! May Heaven reject me!"

Confucius taught that Heaven could not be deceived:

The Master, being very ill, Zi Lu wished the disciples to act as ministers to him. During a remission of his illness, he said, "Long has the conduct of You been deceitful! By pretending to have ministers when I have them not, whom should I impose upon? Should I impose upon Heaven? Moreover, rather than that I should die in the hands of ministers, is it not better that I should die in the hands of you, my disciples? And though I may not get a great burial, shall I die upon the road?"

He believed that Heaven assigned tasks to people in order to teach them virtue and morality:

The Master said, "At fifteen, I had my mind bent on learning. At thirty, I stood firm. At forty, I had no doubts. At fifty, I knew the decrees of Heaven. At sixty, my ear was an obedient organ for the reception of truth. At seventy, I could follow what my heart desired, without transgressing what was right."

Confucius expressed confidence that Heaven knew and approved of his work, even if human rulers did not recognize him:

The Master said, "Alas! there is no one that knows me." Zi Gong said, "What do you mean by thus saying—that no one knows you?" The Master replied, "I do not murmur against Heaven. I do not grumble against men. My studies lie low, and my penetration rises high. But there is Heaven—that knows me!"

He also expressed complete trust in the providence of Heaven, even in times of danger:

The Master was put in fear in Kuang. He said, "After the death of King Wen, was not the cause of truth lodged here in me? If Heaven had wished to let this cause of truth perish, then I, a future mortal, should not have obtained such a relation to that cause. While Heaven does not let the cause of truth perish, what can the people of Kuang do to me?"

=== Mozi ===
For Mozi, Heaven was regarded as the divine ruler, in the same way that the Son of Heaven functioned as the earthly ruler. Mozi accepted the existence of spirits and minor demons—or at least argued that rituals should be performed as if they existed for social reasons—but considered their role to be carrying out the will of Heaven by observing human conduct and punishing wrongdoers. He taught that Heaven loves all people equally and that individuals should therefore extend love impartially to all human beings, without distinguishing between relatives and strangers.

Mozi also criticized the Confucians of his time for failing to follow what he considered the authentic teachings of Confucius. In his Will of Heaven (Tiānzhì, 天志), he wrote:

"Moreover, I know Heaven loves men dearly not without reason. Heaven ordered the sun, the moon, and the stars to enlighten and guide them. Heaven ordained the four seasons—Spring, Autumn, Winter, and Summer—to regulate them. Heaven sent down snow, frost, rain, and dew to grow the five grains and flax and silk so the people could use and enjoy them. Heaven established the hills and rivers, ravines and valleys, and arranged many things to minister to man's good or bring him evil. He appointed the dukes and lords to reward the virtuous and punish the wicked, and to gather metal and wood, birds and beasts, and to engage in cultivating the five grains and flax and silk to provide for the people's food and clothing. This has been so from antiquity to the present."

=== Schools of cosmology ===
Three major schools addressed the structure of Tian, from which most later hypotheses were derived.

- Gàitiān shuō (蓋天說, "canopy-heavens hypothesis"): Originating in the Zhoubi Suanjing, it proposed that the earth was covered by a material heaven resembling a canopy.
- Hùntiān shuō (渾天說, "egg-like hypothesis"): Suggested that the earth was surrounded by a spherical heaven rotating around it, with celestial bodies attached to the heavenly sphere. (See also: Zhang Heng § Astronomy and mathematics, Chinese creation myth.)
- Xuānyè shuō (宣夜說, "firmament hypothesis"): Described heaven as infinite space, with celestial bodies regarded as light substances floating within it and moved by qi. A summary by Ji Meng (郗萌)appears in the astronomical chapters of the Book of Jin.

These schools shaped popular conceptions of the universe and the earth until the 17th century, when they were gradually replaced by cosmological theories introduced from Europe.

In some traditions, the sky was also divided into the Jiǔtiān (九天, "nine divisions of heaven"): the central sky and the eight directions.

=== Buddhism ===
In Buddhist cosmology, Tian (天) refers to the heavenly realms and pure lands.

Certain classes of devas are also referred to as Tian.

=== Taoism ===
In Taoism, the number of vertical heavenly layers varies across traditions. A common belief holds that there are 36 Tian (heavens), "arranged on six levels," each presided over by different deities. The highest heaven is the "Great Web," which was sometimes described as the dwelling place of Yuanshi Tianzun.

After death, Taoists were sometimes believed to explore the "heavenly realms" or to become immortals (xiān). These immortals could be benevolent or malevolent, and rivalries between them were occasionally described.

Some Taoist traditions, such as Shangqing Daoism regarded certain heavens as malevolent, although Tian was more commonly conceived as a positive or benevolent force.

In some interpretations, heaven is viewed as synonymous with the Dao, or as a natural energy accessible through living in harmony with the Dao.

Taoist writings also describe a transcendent realm, sometimes referred to as "the Heavens," which was considered inconceivable to ordinary humans and even to Confucian scholars. Higher spiritual manifestations of Daoist figures such as Laozi were believed to exist there during their lifetimes, absorbing the "purest yīn and yáng." Immortals were also thought to be reborn into this realm after death. These spiritual forms were imagined as abstract beings capable of manifesting as mythical creatures, such as dragons who consumed yīn and yáng energy and traveled on clouds with their qi.

=== Chinese folk religion ===
In Chinese folk religion, some conceptions of Tian (heaven) described it as consisting of multiple, sphere-like realms arranged in a hierarchy. These realms were believed to contain various spirits and creatures, including morally ambiguous beings such as fox spirits and fire-breathing dragons.

Many practitioners of ancient folk religion also believed in the existence of a Tao realm.

=== Ahom religion ===
The Ahom religion, which ethnically originated from the Dai people of Yunnan in Southwest China, includes the concept of Mong Phi ("Heavenly Kingdom"), which is often identified with Tian (heaven).

=== Yiguandao ===
In Yiguandao, Tian (heaven) is divided into three vertical worlds:

- Lǐ Tiān (理天, "heaven of truth")
- Qì Tiān (氣天, "heaven of spirit")
- Xiàng Tiān (象天, "heaven of matter")

== Japanese interpretations ==
In Shinto, heaven was sometimes conceived as a hierarchy of multiple, sphere-like realms inhabited by kami. Myths concerning the kami describe their activities both on Earth and in heaven. Heaven was generally regarded as a pure and orderly domain for nature deities in Shinto.

== Interpretation by Western sinologists ==
Sinologist Herrlee Creel, in his study The Origin of the Deity T'ien, provides an overview of the historical development of Tian (天) in ancient China.

Creel notes that for centuries it was believed that all Chinese historically revered Tian as the highest deity, synonymous with Di or Shangdi (上帝).

However, evidence from Shang dynasty inscriptions indicates that Tian is not mentioned in these sources; instead, they frequently refer to Di or Shangdi. The term Tian appears primarily in Zhou texts, suggesting that it was originally a Zhou deity. After the Zhou conquest, Tian came to be identified with the Shang deity Di, in a manner analogous to how the Romans identified Zeus with Jupiter.

Creel highlights a historical shift in terminology for "god" from the Shang to the Zhou period. Shang oracle inscriptions often used Di and Shangdi, while Zhou bronzes and texts increasingly employed Tian.

For example, the chapter Tang Shi (湯誓, "Tang's speech") demonstrates early Zhou usage of Tian alongside Shangdi. According to tradition, Tang of Shang addressed his subjects to overthrow King Jie of the Xia dynasty:

"Come, ye multitudes of the people, listen all to my words. It is not I, the little child, who dare to undertake what may seem to be a rebellious enterprise; but for the many crimes of the sovereign of Hsiâ [Xia] Heaven has given the charge [...] to destroy him. Now, ye multitudes, you are saying, 'Our prince does not compassionate us… Assist, I pray you, me, the one man, to carry out the punishment appointed by Heaven [Tiān]. I will greatly reward you.'"

Based on the evidence, Creel proposes that Tian developed from earlier concepts of kingship. In both Shang and Zhou pictographs dà (大, "great man") represented a large or important person. The Zhou added a head to this figure to denote Tian (天) originally meaning "king" or "kings" (cf. wáng, 王). Over time, the meaning of Tian expanded to refer to ancestral kings controlling fate and providence, and ultimately to a single omnipotent deity. Tian also came to designate both "heaven" as a realm for ancestral kings and gods, and the visible "sky".

Another possibility is that Tian may be related to Tengri, suggesting a potential origin as a loanword from a prehistoric Central Asian language.

Western scholar Kelly James Clark has argued that Confucius may have viewed Tian as an anthropomorphic deity, which Clark terms the "Heavenly Supreme Emperor," though most other Confucian scholars disagree with this interpretation.

== See also ==
- Amenominakanushi – the Japanese concept of God as the ultimate creator
- Haneullim – the Sky God of Cheondoism
- Hongjun Laozu
- Shen
- Taiyi Tianzun
- Tengri
