= Houtu =

Chinese deity of the deep earth

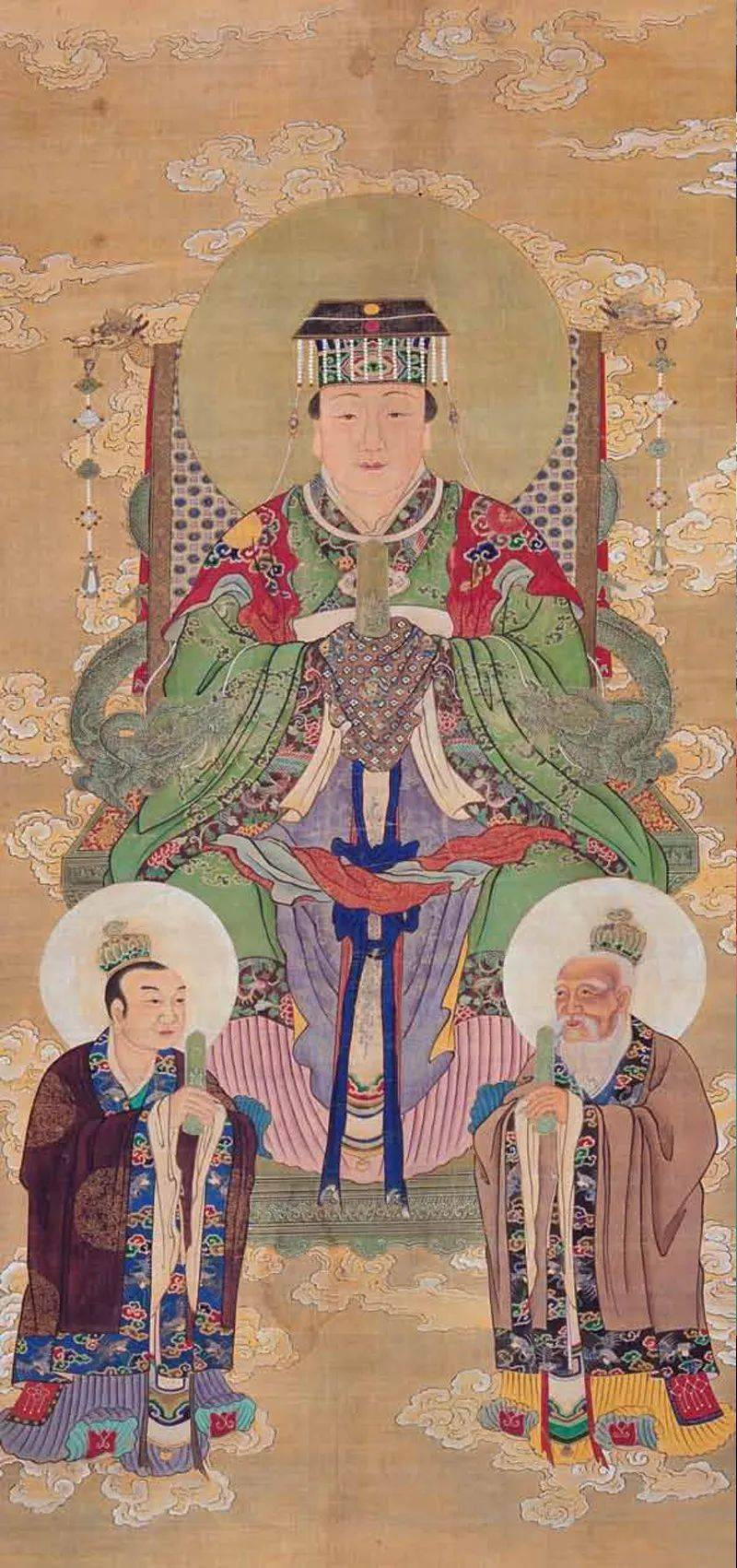
- Painting of Goddess Houtu with attendant in White Cloud Temple of Beijing China

Chinese name
- Chinese: 后土
- Literal meaning: Queen of the Earth
Transcriptions
Standard Mandarin
- Hanyu Pinyin: Hòutǔ
- IPA: [xôʊ.tʰù]
Yue: Cantonese
- IPA: [hɐw˨.tʰu˧˥]

Korean name
- Hangul: 후토
- Hanja: 后土
Transcriptions
- Revised Romanization: Huto
- McCune–Reischauer: Hut'o

Japanese name
- Kanji: 后土
- Kana: こうど
Transcriptions
- Romanization: Kōdo

Hòutǔ (Chinese: 后土; lit. 'Queen of the Earth') or Hòutǔshén (后土神; 'Goddess Queen of the Earth'), also known as Hòutǔ Niángniáng (in Chinese either 厚土娘娘; 'Deep Earth Lady', Aoshen 媪神; 媼神; 'Old Goddess' or 后土娘娘; 'Earth Queen Lady'), otherwise called Dimǔ (地母; 'Mother Earth') or Dimǔ Niángniáng (地母娘娘; 'Lady Mother Earth'), is the deity of all land and earth in Chinese religion and mythology. Houtu is the overlord of all the Tudigongs ("Lord of Local Land"), Sheji ("the State"), Shan Shen ("God of Mountains"), City Gods ("God of Local City"), and landlord gods worldwide.

In Taoism, Houtu is one of the Four Heavenly Ministers, which are four of the highest-ranking gods in Taoism.

== Role ==
Houtu was originally a male earth god in early Chinese mythology, later absorbed into Taoism as one of the Four Heavenly Ministers. Over time, the earth goddess Dimǔ emerged, and the name "Houtu" came to refer to all earth deities.

However, in folk customs, Dimǔ is not called Houtu. People seem to intentionally distinguish between Dimǔ and Houtu, and "Houtu" is often used to refer to male earth deities, even though "Houtu" is also a name for Dimǔ. Furthermore, in some historical records, Houtu is sometimes not synonymous with Dimǔ, but retains its original identity as a male earth god.

=== In early mythology ===
According to early Chinese classics Zuo Zhuan (late 4th century BC), Book of Rites and Classic of Mountains and Seas, Houtu is the son of Gonggong, being able to control the flood by installing mountains of Earth. He is also the assistant god to one of the Great Five Emperors, the Huang Di, being the god of the Earth element in the Wuxing system.

In early myths Gonggong also was related to the first Tudigong, his son Gou Long who was appointed as a god of the soil by Zhuanxu.

=== In Taoism ===
In Taoism, Houtu is one of the Four Heavenly Ministers, along with Jade Emperor, Gouchen Emperor and Ziwei Emperor. In some Taoist scripts, another two gods, Changsheng Emperor and Qinghua Emperor (青华大帝), are added to constitute "Six Heavenly Ministers" (六御). The Daochang of Houtu is at Mount Jiuhua.

Due to the belief that Tian (sky) represents yang and Di (earth) represents yin, most people believe Houtu is a female deity.

=== In Buddhism ===
Some scholars link Houtu to the Buddhist goddess Bhumi, which is the personification of Earth.

== Worship ==
Houtu was first worshipped by Emperor Wen of Han (in Fenyin County, modern-day Wanrong County, Shanxi) and by Emperor Wu of Han in 113 BC.

== Yellow River Map ==
Houtu is featured in some versions of the myth of the Great Flood of China: Yu did not do such a great job of channeling the Yellow River into the sea, dredging the wrong way. Sacred Mother Houtu then made the Yellow River Map and sent one of her divine messenger birds to tell Yu what to do; specifically, that he should open a channel to the east, to allow the right drainage.

== Gallery ==
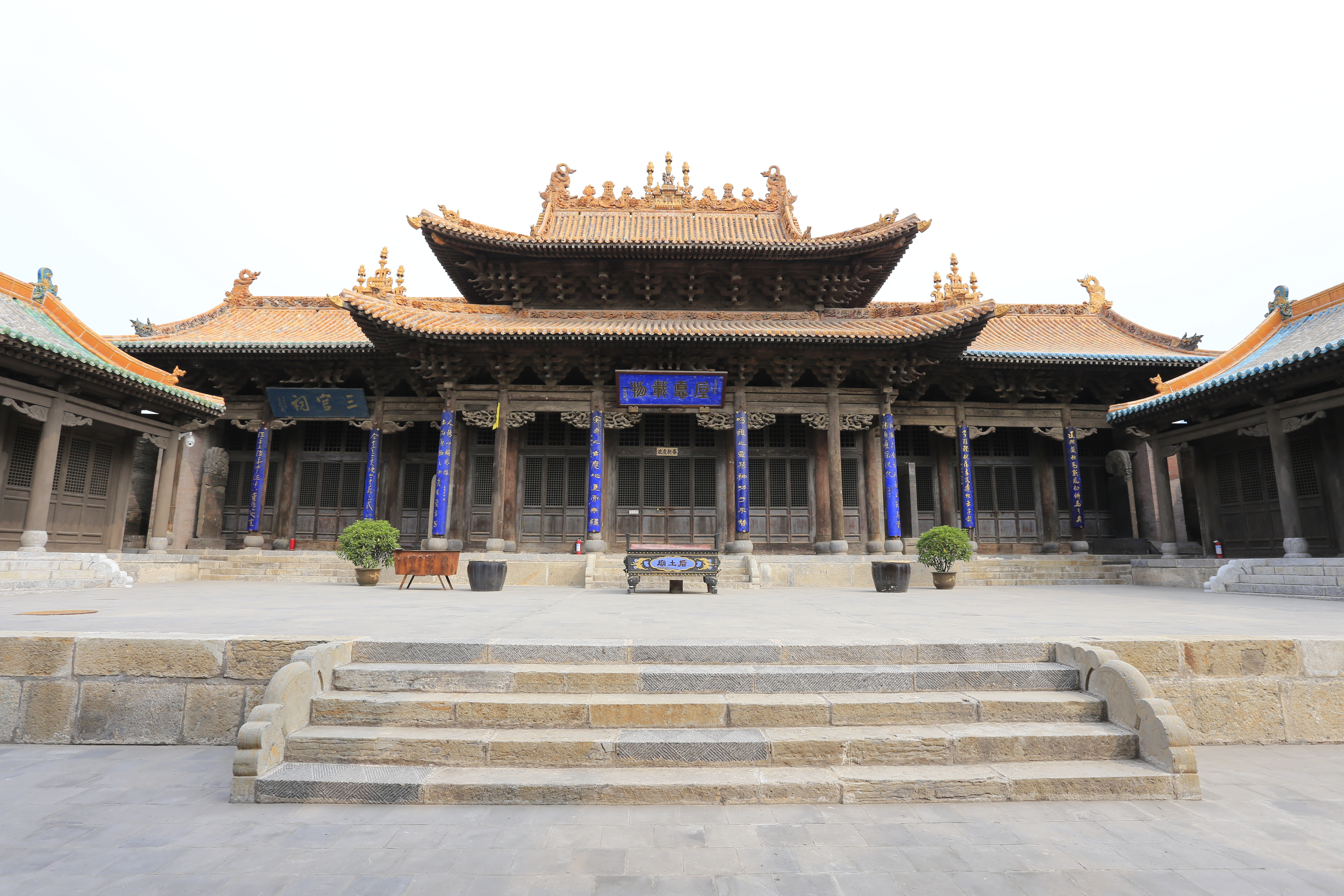
Temple of the Queen of the Earth in Jiexiu, Shanxi.

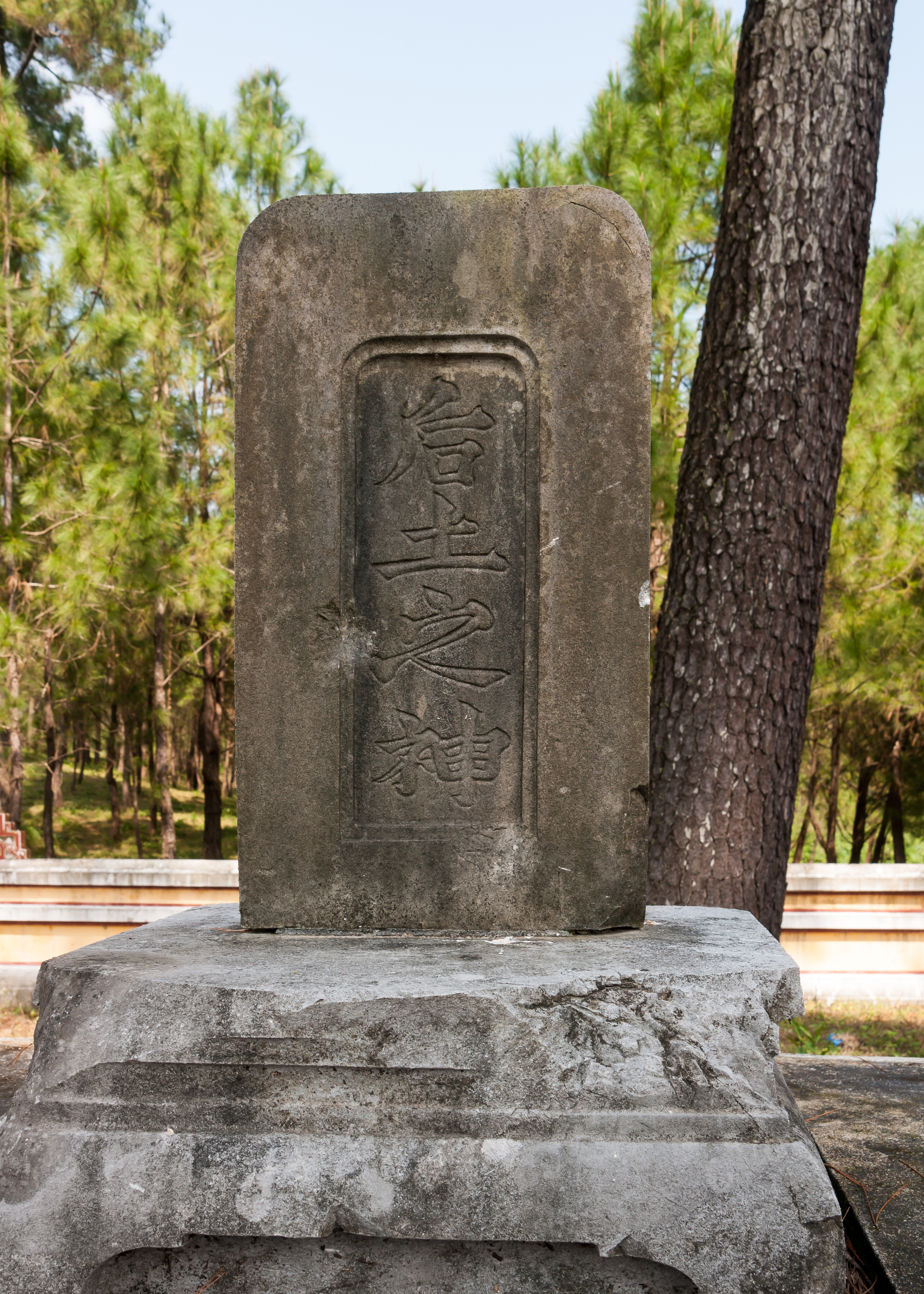
Stone for the deity Houtu at the burial site of Gia Long, former emperor of Vietnam.

== See also ==
- Chinese spiritual world concepts
- Huangtian Dadi (皇天大帝)
- Huangtian Shangdi (皇天上帝)
- Sheji (社稷)
- Tian (天) and Di (地)
- Tu Di Gong (土地公)
