= Chinese theology =

Chinese theological conception of Heaven

Chinese theology, which comes in different interpretations according to the Chinese classics and Chinese folk religion, and specifically Confucian, Taoist, and other philosophical formulations, is fundamentally monistic, that is to say it sees the world and the gods of its phenomena as an organic whole, or cosmos, which continuously emerges from a simple principle. This is expressed by the concept that "all things have one and the same principle" (Chinese: 萬物一理; pinyin: wànwù yīlǐ). This principle is commonly referred to as 天; Tiān, a concept generally translated as "Heaven", referring to the northern culmen and starry vault of the skies and its natural laws which regulate earthly phenomena and generate beings as their progenitors. Ancestors are therefore regarded as the equivalent of Heaven within human society, and hence as the means connecting back to Heaven which is the "utmost ancestral father" (曾祖父; zēngzǔfù). Chinese theology may be also called Tiānxué (天學; "study of Heaven"), a term already in use in the 17th and 18th centuries.

The universal principle that gives origin to the world is conceived as transcendent and immanent to creation at the same time. The Chinese idea of the universal God is expressed in different ways. There are many names of God from the various sources of Chinese tradition, reflecting a "hierarchic, multiperspective" observation of the supreme God.

Chinese scholars emphasise that the Chinese tradition contains two facets of the idea of God: one is the personified God of popular devotion, and the other one is the impersonal God of philosophical inquiry. Together, they express an "integrated definition of the monistic world".

Interest in traditional Chinese theology has waxed and waned over the various periods of the history of China. For instance, the Great Leap Forward enacted in the mid-20th century involved the outright destruction of traditional temples in accordance with Maoist ideology. From the 1980s onward, public revivals have taken place. Historically, Chinese theology has espoused that deities or stars are arranged in a "celestial bureaucracy" that influences earthly activities and is reflected by the hierarchy of the Chinese state itself. These beliefs have similarities with broader Asian Shamanism. The alignment of earthly and heavenly forces is upheld through the practice of rites and rituals (Li), for instance, the jiao festivals in which sacrificial offerings of incense and other products are set up by local temples, with participants hoping to renew the perceived alliance between community leaders and the gods.

== Creation as ordering of primordial potentiality ==
As explained by the scholar Stephan Feuchtwang, in Chinese cosmology "the universe creates itself out of a primary chaos of material energy" (hundun and qi), organising as the polarity of yin and yang which characterises any thing and life. Creation is therefore a continuous ordering; it is not a creatio ex nihilo. Yin and yang are the invisible and the visible, the receptive and the active, the unshaped and the shaped; they characterise the yearly cycle (winter and summer), the landscape (shady and bright), the sexes (female and male), and even sociopolitical history (disorder and order). The gods themselves are divided into yin forces of contraction, guǐ (鬼; "demons" or "ghosts") and yang forces of expansion shén (神; "gods" or "spirits"); in the human being they are the hun and po (where hun (魂) is yang and po (魄) is yin; respectively, the rational and emotional soul, or the ethereal and the corporeal soul). Together, guishen (鬼神) is another way to define the twofold operation of the God of Heaven, its resulting dynamism being called itself shen, spirit.

By the words of the Neo-Confucian thinker Cheng Yi:

[Heaven] is called ... the gǔi-shén with respect to its operation, the shén with respect to its wonderful functioning.

Another Neo-Confucian, Zhu Xi, says:

The shén is expansion and the gǔi is contraction. As long as it is blowing wind, raining, thundering, or flashing, [we call it] shén, while it stops, [we call it] gǔi.

The Chinese dragon, associated with the constellation Draco winding the north ecliptic pole and slithering between the Little and Big Dipper (or Great Chariot), represents the "protean" primordial power, which embodies both yin and yang in unity, and therefore the awesome unlimited power (qi) of divinity. In Han-dynasty traditions, Draco is described as the spear of the supreme God.

Heaven continuously begets—according to its own manifest model which is the starry vault revolving around the northern culmen (北極; Běijí)—and reabsorbs, the temporal things and worlds. As explained in modern Confucian theology:

... the historical Heaven, namely the generated Heaven, [is] one particular form or modification (marked by the emergence of celestial bodies) of the eternal Heaven. This eternal Heaven was embodied in pure qì before its historical form had been realized.

Rather than "creation" (造; zào), which has a long Western connotation of creation ex nihilo, modern Chinese theologians prefer to speak of "evolution" (化; huà) to describe the begetting of the cosmos; even in modern Chinese language the two concepts are frequently held together, zàohuà ("creation-evolution"). Such ordering power, which belongs to deities but also to humans, expresses itself in rites (礼; lǐ). They are the means by which alignment between the forces of the starry sky, of earthly phenomena, and the acts of human beings (the three realms of Heaven-Earth-humanity, 天地人; Tiāndìrén), is established. Such harmonisation is referred to as "centering" (央; yāng or 中; zhōng). Rituals may be performed by government officials, family elders, popular ritual masters, and Taoists, the latter cultivating local gods to centre the forces of the universe upon a particular locality. Since humans are capable of centering natural forces, by the means of rites, they are themselves "central" to creation.

Human beings participate in the ongoing creation-evolution of the God of Heaven, acting as ancestors who may produce and influence other beings:

The involvement of an evolution in the divine creation hints that, although the Creator functions everywhere and all the time, every little creation is also participated by one particular thing which was previously created by the Creator. That is to say, each creature plays both the roles of creature and creator, and consequently is not only a fixed constituent of, but also a promoter and author of, the diversity or richness of the world.

The relationship between oneness and multiplicity, between the supreme principle and the myriad things, is notably explained by Zhu Xi through the "metaphor of the moon":

Fundamentally there is only one Great Pole (Tàijí), yet each of the myriad things has been endowed with it and each in itself possesses the Great Ultimate in its entirety. This is similar to the fact that there is only one moon in the sky, but when its light is scattered upon rivers and lakes, it can be seen everywhere. It cannot be said that the moon has been split.

In his terminology, the myriad things are generated as effects or actualities (用; yòng) of the supreme principle, which, before in potence (體; tǐ), sets in motion qi. The effects are different, forming the "myriad species" (萬殊; wànshū), each relying upon their myriad modifications of the principle, depending on the varying contexts and engagements. Difference exists not only between the various categories of beings, but among individuals belonging to the same category as well, so that each creature is a unique coalescence of the cosmic principle. The qi of kindred beings accord and communicate with one another, and the same happens for the qi of worshippers and the god receiving sacrifice, and for the qi of an ancestor and his descendants. All beings are, at different levels, "in" the God of Heaven, not in the sense of addition but in the sense of belonging.

In the Confucian tradition, the perfect government is that which emulates the ordering of the starry vault of Heaven:

To conduct government by virtue may be compared to the North Star: it occupied its place, while the myriad stars revolve around it.

— Confucius, Analects 2:1

== Names and attributes of the God of Heaven in the tradition ==
Tian is dian 顛 ("top"), the highest and unexceeded. It derives from the characters yi 一, "one", and da 大, "big".

Since the Shang (1600–1046 BCE) and Zhou dynasty 1046–256 BCE), the radical Chinese terms for the supreme God are Tiān (天) and Shangdi (上帝; "Highest Deity") or simply Dì (帝; "Deity"). (Note: 帝; Dì is sometimes translated as "thearch", from the Greek theos ("deity"), with arche ("principle", "origin"), thus meaning "divine principle", "divine origin". In sinology it has been used to designate the incarnated gods who, according to Chinese tradition, sustain the world order and originated China.) Another concept is Tàidì (太帝; "Great Deity"). These names are combined in different ways in Chinese theological literature, often interchanged in the same paragraph if not in the same sentence. One of the combinations is the name of God used at the Temple of Heaven in Beijing, which is the "Highest Deity the Heavenly King" (皇天上帝; Huángtiān Shàngdì); others are "Great Deity the Heavenly King" (天皇大帝; Tiānhuáng Dàdì) and "Supreme Deity of the Vast Heaven" (昊天上帝; Hàotiān Shàngdì).

God is considered manifest in this world as the northern culmen and starry vault of the skies which regulate nature. As its see, the circumpolar stars (the Little and Big Dipper, or broader Ursa Minor and Ursa Major) are known, among various names, as Tiānmén (天門; "Gate of Heaven") and Tiānshū (天樞; "Pivot of Heaven"), or the "celestial clock" regulating the four seasons of time. The Chinese supreme God is compared to the conception of the supreme God identified as the north celestial pole in other cultures, including the Mesopotamian An ("Heaven" itself), and Enlil and Enki/Marduk, the Vedic Indra and Mitra–Varuna, the Zoroastrian Ahura Mazda, as well as the Dyeus of common Proto-Indo-European religion.

Throughout the Chinese theological literary tradition, the Dipper constellations, and especially the Big Dipper (北斗星; Běidǒuxīng; "Northern Dipper"), also known as Great Chariot, within Ursa Major, are portrayed as the potent symbols of spirit, divinity, or of the activity of the supreme God regulating nature. Examples include:

The Dipper is the Deity’s carriage. It revolves about the centre, visiting and regulating each of the four regions. It divides yin from yang, establishes the four seasons, equalises the five elemental phases, deploys the seasonal junctures and angular measures, and determines the various periodicities: all these are tied to the Dipper.

— Sima Qian, Treatise on the Celestial Officers

When the handle of the Dipper points to the east at dawn, it is spring to all the world. When the handle of the Dipper points to the south it is summer to all the world. When the handle of the Dipper points to the west, it is autumn to all the world. When the handle of the Dipper points to the north, it is winter to all the world. As the handle of the Dipper rotates above, so affairs are set below.

— Heguanzi, 5:21/1-4

Dì is literally a title expressing dominance over the all-under-Heaven, that is all created things. It is etymologically and figuratively analogous to the concept of di as the base of a fruit, which falls and produces other fruits. This analogy is attested in the Shuowen Jiezi explaining "deity" as "what faces the base of a melon fruit". Tiān is usually translated as "Heaven", but by graphical etymology it means "Great One" and scholars relate it to the same Dì through phonetic etymology and trace their common root, through their archaic forms respectively *Teeŋ and *Tees, to the symbols of the celestial pole and its spinning stars. Other words, such as dǐng (顶; "on top", "apex") would share the same etymology, all connected to a conceptualisation—according to the scholar John C. Didier—of the north celestial pole godhead as cosmic square (口; Dīng). Zhou (2005) even connects Dì, through Old Chinese *Tees and by phonetic etymology, to the Proto-Indo-European Dyeus. Medhurst (1847) also shows affinities in the usage of "deity", Chinese di, Greek theos and Latin deus, for incarnate powers resembling the supreme godhead.

=== Shang–Zhou theology ===
Ulrich Libbrecht distinguishes two layers in the development of early Chinese theology, traditions derived respectively from the Shang and subsequent Zhou dynasties. The religion of the Shang was based on the worship of ancestors and god-kings, who survived as unseen divine forces after death. They were not transcendent entities, since the cosmos was "by itself so", not created by a force outside of it but generated by internal rhythms and cosmic powers. The royal ancestors were called dì (帝; 'deities'), and the utmost progenitor was Shangdi, identified with the dragon. Already in Shang theology, the multiplicity of gods of nature and ancestors were viewed as parts of Shangdi, and the four fāng (方; 'directions') and their fēng (風; 'winds') as his cosmic will.

The Zhou dynasty, which overthrew the Shang, emphasised a more universal idea of Tian (天; "Heaven"). The Shang dynasty's identification of Shangdi as their ancestor-god had asserted their claim to power by divine right; the Zhou transformed this claim into a legitimacy based on moral power, the Mandate of Heaven. In Zhou theology, Tian had no singular earthly progeny, but bestowed divine favour on virtuous rulers. Zhou kings declared that their victory over the Shang was because they were virtuous and loved their people, while the Shang were tyrants and thus were deprived of power by Tian.

==== Tian ====
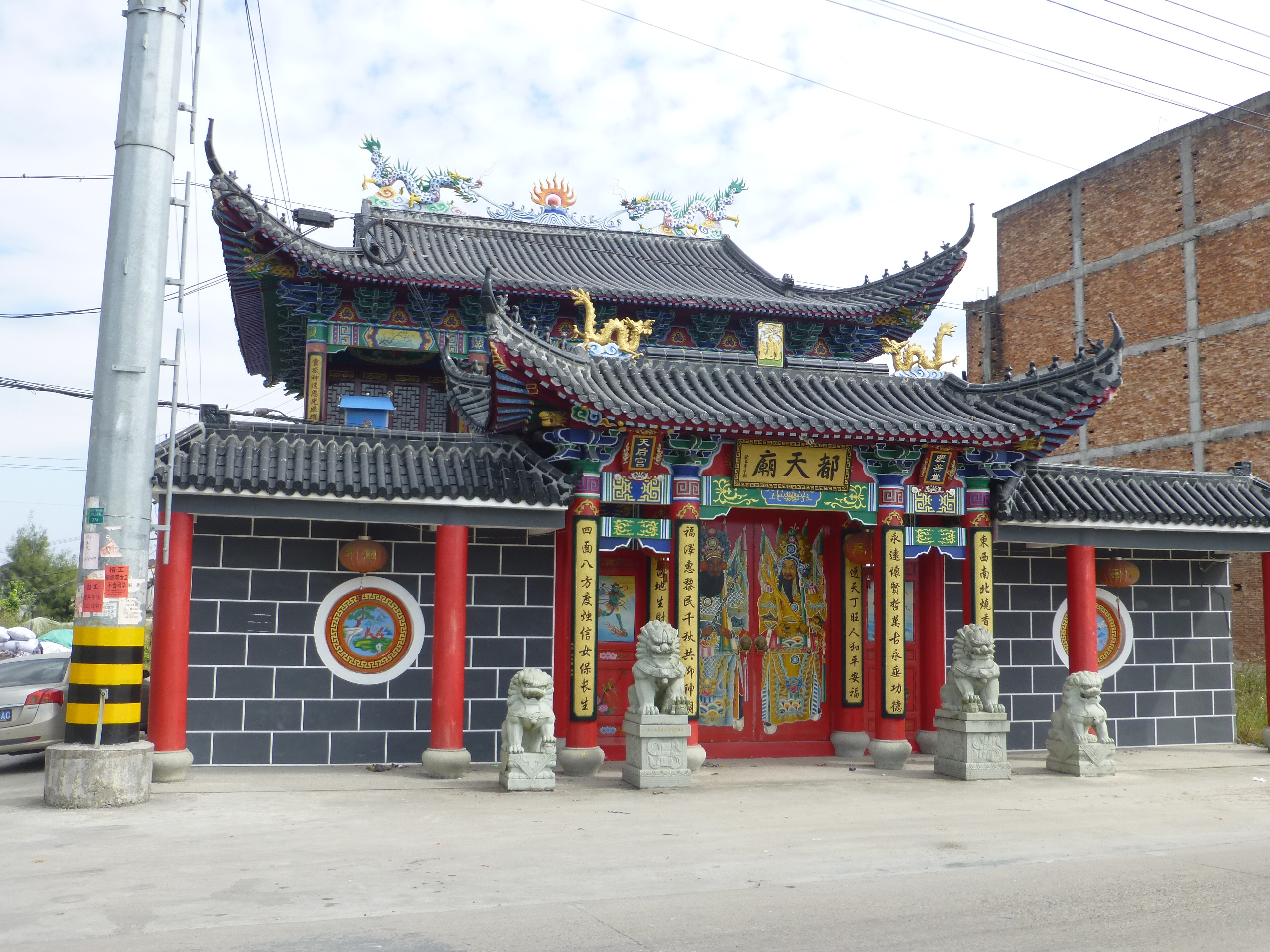
Temple of All-Heaven (都天庙; dōutiānmiào) in Longgang, Cangnan, Wenzhou, Zhejiang

Tian is both transcendent and immanent as the starry vault, manifesting in the three forms of dominance, destiny, and nature. There are many compounds of the name Tian, and many of these clearly distinguish a "Heaven of dominance", a "Heaven of destiny", and a "Heaven of nature" as attributes of the supreme cosmic God.

In the Wujing yiyi (五經異義), "Different Meanings in the Five Classics"), Xu Shen explains that the designation of Heaven is quintuple:

- Huáng Tiān (皇天) —"August Heaven", "Yellow Heaven", or "Shining Heaven", when it is venerated as the lord of creation;
- Hào Tiān (昊天)—"Vast Heaven", with regard to the vastness of its vital breath (qi);
- Mín Tiān (旻天)—"Compassionate Heaven", for it hears and corresponds to justice to the all-under-Heaven;
- Shàng Tiān (上天)—"Highest Heaven" or "First Heaven", for it is the primordial being supervising all-under-Heaven;
- Cāng Tiān (苍天)—"Deep-Green Heaven", for it being unfathomably deep.

Other names of the God of Heaven include:

- Tiāndì (天帝)—the "Deity of Heaven" or "Emperor of Heaven": "On Rectification" (Zheng lun) of the Xunzi uses this term to refer to the active God of Heaven setting in motion creation;
- Tiānzhǔ (天主)—the "Lord of Heaven": In "The Document of Offering Sacrifices to Heaven and Earth on the Mountain Tai" (Fengshan shu) of the Records of the Grand Historian it is used as the title of the first God from whom all the other gods derive.
- Tiānhuáng (天皇)—the "August Personage of Heaven": In the "Poem of Fathoming Profundity" (Si'xuan fu), transcribed in "The History of the Later Han Dynasty" (Hou Han shu), Zhang Heng ornately writes: "I ask the superintendent of the Heavenly Gate to open the door and let me visit the King of Heaven at the Jade Palace";
- Tiānwáng (天王)—the "King of Heaven" or "Monarch of Heaven".
- Tiāngōng (天公)—the "Duke of Heaven" or "General of Heaven";
- Tiānjūn (天君)—the "Prince of Heaven" or "Lord of Heaven";
- Tiānzūn (天尊)—the "Heavenly Venerable", also a title for high gods in Taoist theologies;
- Tiānshén (天神)—the "God of Heaven", interpreted in the Shuowen Jiezi as "the being that gives birth to all things";
- Shénhuáng (神皇)—"God the August", attested in Taihong ("The Origin of Vital Breath");
- Lǎotiānyé (老天爷))—the "Olden Heavenly Father".

Attributes of the supreme God of Heaven include:

- Tiāndào (天道)—"Way of Heaven"; it is the God's will of power, which decides the development of things: The Book of Historical Documents says that "the Way of Heaven is to bless the good, and make the bad miserable". It is also used to refer to Xiantiandao and is the name of some religious traditions within it; and it is used in many philosophical and religious contexts in the Sinosphere;
- Tiānmìng (天命)—"Mandate of Heaven", defining the destiny of things;
- Tiānyì (天意)—"Decree of Heaven", the same concept of destiny but implying an active decision;
- Tiānxià (天下)—"Under Heaven"; means creation, an ongoing process generated by the supreme God.

==== Shangdi ====
Shang graphemes for stars–gods–ancestors

①

②

③

④

⑤

Images 1 to 4 are all Shang script variants for k:星; xīng; "star(s)", "god(s)", "ancestor(s)", composed by three to five grouped 口; dīng. It continues in modern k:jīng (晶; "crystal", "shining"). Image 5 is a variant of Shàngjiǎ k:上甲; "Supreme Ancestor", i.e. Shangdi.

Shàngdì (上帝; "Highest Deity"), sometimes shortened simply to Dì (帝; "Deity"), is another name of the supreme God inherited from Shang and Zhou times. The Classic of Poetry recites: "How vast is the Highest Deity, the ruler of men below!". Dì is also applied to the name of cosmic gods besides the supreme godhead, and is used to compose titles of divinity; for instance 帝君; Dìjūn; "Divine Ruler", Latin: Dominus Deus", used in Taoism for high deities in the celestial hierarchy.

In the Shang dynasty, as discussed by John C. Didier, Shangdi was the same as Dīng (口, modern 丁), the "square" as the north celestial pole, and Shàngjiǎ (上甲; "Supreme Ancestor") was an alternative name. Shangdi was conceived as the utmost ancestor of the Shang royal lineage, the Zi (子) lineage, also called Ku (or Kui) or Diku ("Divus Ku"), attested in the Shiji and other texts.

The other gods associated with the circumpolar stars were all embraced by Shangdi, and they were conceived as the ancestors of side noble lineages of the Shang and even non-Shang peripheral peoples who benefited from the identification of their ancestor-gods as part of Di. Together they were called xiàdì (下帝; "lower deities"), part of the "Highest Deity" of the Shang. With the supreme God identified as the pivot of the skies, all the lesser gods were its stars 星; xīng, a word which in Shang script was illustrated by a few grouped 口; dīng (cf. 晶; jīng; "perfect [celestial, i.e., star] light", and 品; pǐn; "originally "starlight"); up to the Han dynasty it was still common to represent the stars as small squares. The Shang conducted magnificent sacrifices to these ancestor-gods, whose altar mimicked the stars of the north celestial pole. Through this sympathetic magic, which consisted of reproducing the celestial centre on earth, the Shang established and monopolised the centralising political power.

=== Qin-Han theology ===
The emperors of the Qin dynasty (221–206 BCE) are credited with an effort to unify the cults of the Wǔfāng Shàngdì (五方上帝; "Five Forms of the Highest Deity"), which were previously held at different locations, into single temple complexes. The Five Deities are a cosmological conception of the fivefold manifestation of the supreme God, or his five changing faces, that are elaborated in the classic texts and may originate from the Neolithic. They "reflect the cosmic structure of the world" in which yin, yang, and all forces are held in balance, and are associated with the four directions of space and the centre, the five sacred mountains, the five phases of creation, and the five constellations rotating around the celestial pole and five planets.

During the Han dynasty (206 BCE–220 CE), the theology of the state religion developed side by side with the Huang–Lao religious movement which in turn influenced the early Taoist Church, and focused on a conceptualisation of the supreme God of the culmen of the sky as the Yellow God of the centre, and its human incarnation, the Yellow Emperor or Yellow Deity. Unlike previous Shang concepts of human incarnations of the supreme godhead, considered exclusively as the progenitors of the royal lineage, the Yellow Emperor was a more universal archetype of the human being. The competing factions of the Confucians and the fāngshì (方士; "masters of directions"), regarded as representatives of the ancient religious tradition inherited from previous dynasties, concurred in the formulation of the Han state religion.

==== Taiyi ====
Tàiyī (太一; also spelled 太乙; Tàiyǐ or "Great Oneness" or "Great Unity" (泰一; Tàiyī), also known as "Supreme Oneness of the Central Yellow" (中黄太乙; Zhōnghuáng Tàiyǐ), or the "Yellow God of the Northern Dipper" (黄神北斗; Huángshén Běidǒu) (Note: A 斗; dǒu in Chinese is an entire semantic field meaning the shape of a "dipper", as the Big Dipper (北斗; Běidǒu), or a "cup", signifying a "whirl", and also has martial connotations meaning "fight", "struggle", "battle".)), or "Heavenly Venerable Supreme Unity" (太一天尊; Tàiyī Tiānzūn), is a name of the supreme God of Heaven that had become prominent besides the older ones during the Han dynasty in relation to the figure of the Yellow Emperor. It harkens back to the Warring States period, as attested in the poem The Supreme Oneness Gives Birth to Water, and possibly to the Shang dynasty as Dàyī (大一; "Big Oneness"), an alternative name for the Shangs' (and universe's) foremost ancestor.

Taiyi was worshipped by the social elites in the Warring States, and is also the first god described in the Nine Songs, shamanic hymns collected in the Chuci ("Songs of Chu"). Throughout the Qin and the Han dynasties, a distinction became evident between Taiyi as the supreme godhead identified with the northern culmen of the sky and its spinning stars, and a more abstract concept of Yī (一; "One"), which begets the polar godhead bringing into existence the principles of Yin and Yang, the pivot san bao, then "the myriad of beings" and "the ten thousand things"; the more abstract Yi was an "interiorisation" of the supreme God which was influenced by the Confucian discourse.

During the Han dynasty, the concept of Taiyi became part of the imperial sect, and at the same time it was the central concept of Huang–Lao, which influenced the early Taoist Church; in early Taoism, Taiyi was identified as the 道; Dào. The "Inscription for Laozi" (Laozi ming), a Han stela, describes the Taiyi as the source of inspiration and immortality for Laozi. In Huang-Lao, the philosopher-god Laozi was identified as the same as the Yellow Emperor, and received imperial sacrifices, for instance by Emperor Huan (146–168). In Han apocryphal texts, the Big Dipper is described as the instrument of Taiyi, the ladle from which he pours out the primordial breath (yuanqi), and as his heavenly chariot.

A part of the Shiji by Sima Qian identifies Taiyi with the simple name Di (Deity) and tells:

The Dipper is the Thearch's carriage. It revolves around the central point and majestically regulates the four realms. The distribution of yin and yang, the fixing of the four seasons, the coordination of the five phases, the progression of rotational measurements, and the determining of all celestial markers—all of these are linked to the Dipper.

In 113 BCE, Emperor Wu of Han, under the influence of prominent fangshi—Miu Ji and later Gongsun Qing—officially integrated the Huang–Lao theology of Taiyi with the Confucian state religion and theology of the Five Forms of the Highest Deity inherited from the erstwhile dynasties.

==== Huangdi ====
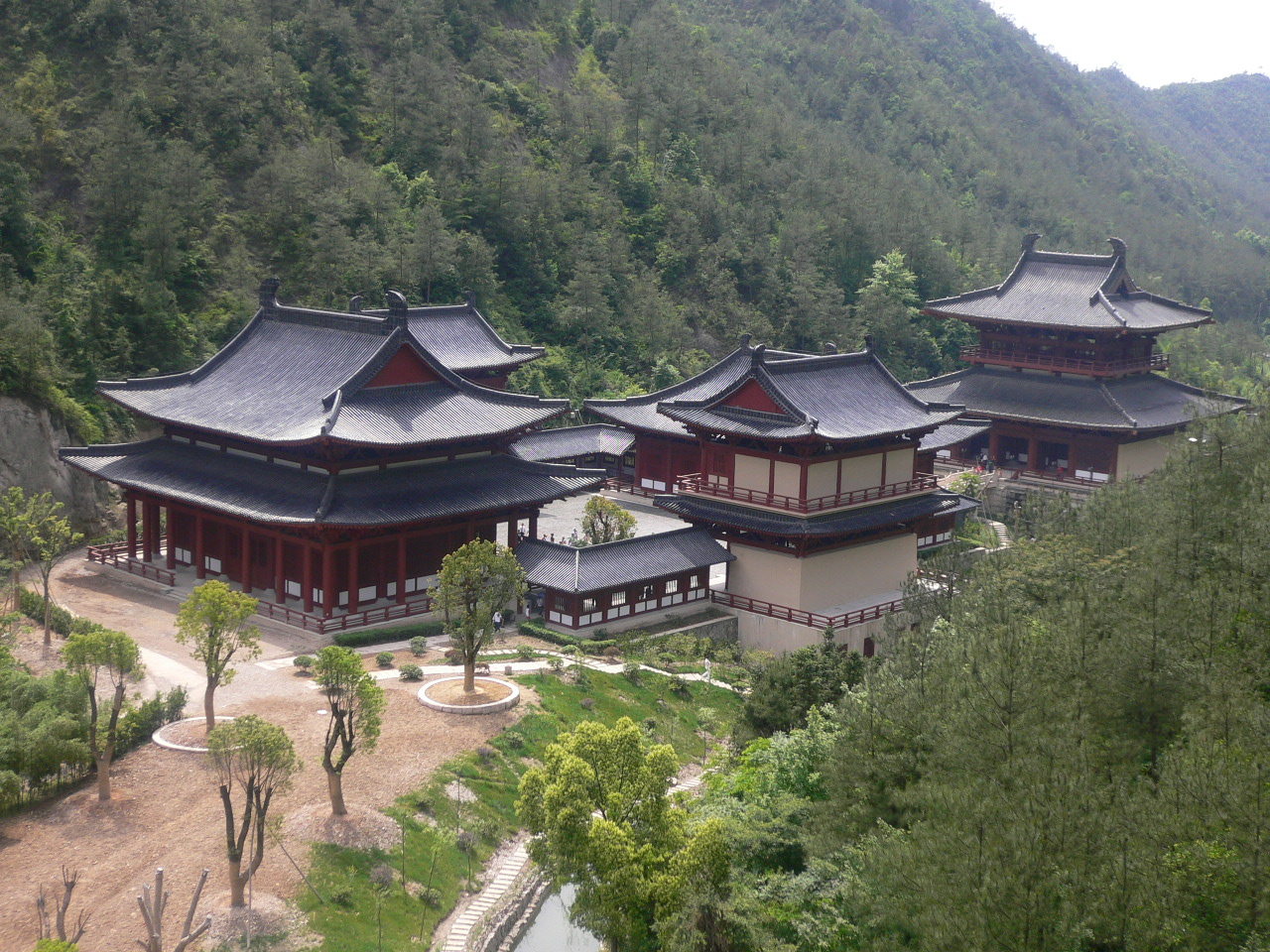
Temple of the Yellow Deity in Jinyun, Lishui, Zhejiang

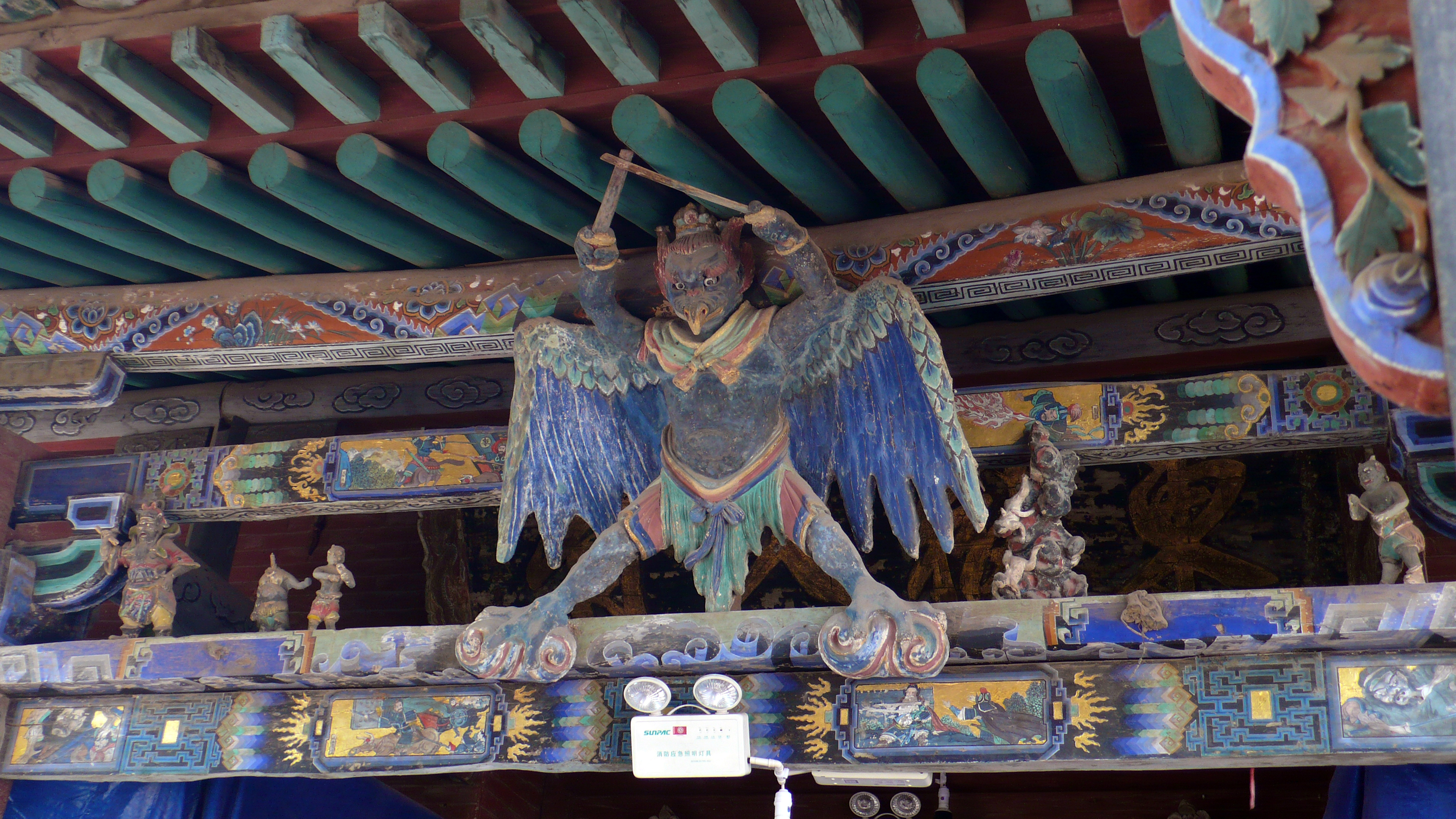
Wooden sculpture of the eagle-faced Thunder God (雷神; Léishén), punisher of those who go against the order of Heaven, at the Temple of the Eastern Peak of Baishan in Pu, Linfen, Shanxi. In the oldest accounts, he is one and the same with the Yellow Emperor.

Huángdì (黄帝; "Yellow Emperor" or "Yellow Deity") is another name of the God of Heaven, associated with the celestial pole and with the power of the wu (shamans). In the older cosmological tradition of the Wufang Shangdi, the Yellow Deity is the main one, associated with the centre of the cosmos. He is also called Huángshén (黄神; "Yellow God"), Xuānyuán (轩辕; "Chariot Shaft")), which is said to have been his personal name as a human incarnation, Xuānyuánshì (轩辕氏; "Master of the Chariot Shaft"), or Xuanyuan Huangdi ("Yellow Deity of the Chariot Shaft").

In Chinese religion he is the deity who shapes the material world (地; Dì), the creator of the Huaxia civilisation, of marriage and morality, language and lineage, and is the progenitor of all Chinese. In the cosmology of the Wufang Shangdi his astral body is Saturn, but he is also identified as the Sun God, and with the star Regulus (α Leonis) and constellations Leo and Lynx, of which the latter is said to represent the body of the Yellow Dragon, his serpentine form. The character huáng (黄), for "yellow", was used in ancient literature as an equivalent to huáng (皇; "august", "creator" and "radiant"), attributes of the supreme God.

As a progenitor, Huangdi is portrayed as the historical incarnation of the Yellow God of the Northern Dipper. According to a definition given by apocryphal texts related to the Hétú (河圖), the Yellow Emperor "proceeds from the essence of the Yellow God of the Northern Dipper", is born to "a daughter of a chthonic deity", and as such he is "a cosmic product of the conflation of Heaven and Earth".

As a human being, the Yellow Emperor was conceived by a virgin mother, Fubao, who was impregnated by Taiyi's radiance (yuanqi, "primordial pneuma"), a lightning, which she saw encircling the Northern Dipper (Great Chariot, or broader Ursa Major), or the celestial pole, while walking in the countryside. She delivered her son after twenty-four months on the mount of Shou (Longevity) or mount Xuanyuan, after which he was named. Through his human side, he was a descendant of the Youxiong clan, a lineage of the Bear—another reference to the Ursa Major. Didier has studied the parallels that the Yellow Emperor's mythology has in other cultures, deducing a plausible ancient origin of the myth in Siberia or in north Asia.

In older accounts, the Yellow Emperor is identified as a deity of light (and his name is explained in the Shuowen Jiezi to derive from 光; guāng; "light") and thunder, and as one and the same with the "Thunder God" (雷神; Léishén), who in turn, as a later mythological character, is distinguished as the Yellow Emperor's foremost pupil, such as in the Huangdi Neijing.

As the deity of the centre, the Yellow Emperor is the Zhongyuedadi (中岳大帝; "Great Deity of the Central Peak") and he represents the essence of earth and the Yellow Dragon. He represents the hub of creation, the axis mundi (Kunlun) that is the manifestation of the divine order in physical reality, opening the way to immortality. As the centre of the four directions, in the Shizi he is described as "Yellow Emperor with Four Faces" (黄帝四面; Huángdì Sìmiàn). The "Four-Faced God" or "Ubiquitous God" (四面神; Sìmiànshén) is also the Chinese name of Brahma.

Huangdi is the model of those who merge their self with the self of the supreme God, of the ascetics who reach enlightenment or immortality. He is the god of nobility, the patron of Taoism and medicine. In the Shiji, as well as in the Taoist book Zhuangzi, he is also described as the perfect king. There are records of dialogues in which Huangdi took the advice of wise counselors, contained in the Huangdi Neijing ("Inner Scripture of the Yellow Emperor") as well as in the Shiwen ("Ten Questions"). In the Huang–Lao tradition he is the model of a king turned immortal, and is associated with the transmission of various mantic and medical techniques. Besides the Inner Scripture of the Yellow Emperor, Huangdi is also associated with other textual bodies of knowledge including the Huangdi Sijing ("Four Scriptures of the Yellow Emperor") and the Huangdi zhaijing ("Scripture of the Dwellings of the Yellow Emperor").

In the cosmology of the Wufang Shangdi, besides the Yellow Deity, the "Black Deity" (黑帝; Hēidì) of the north, winter and Mercury, is portrayed by Sima Qian as Huangdi's grandson, and is himself associated with the north pole stars. The "Green Deity" (蒼帝; Cāngdì) or "Blue Deity" (青帝; Qīngdì), of the east, spring, and identified with Jupiter, is frequently worshipped as the supreme God and its main temple at Mount Tai (the cult centre of all Eastern Peak Temples) is attested as a site for fire sacrifices to the supreme God since prehistoric times.

=== Yudi ===
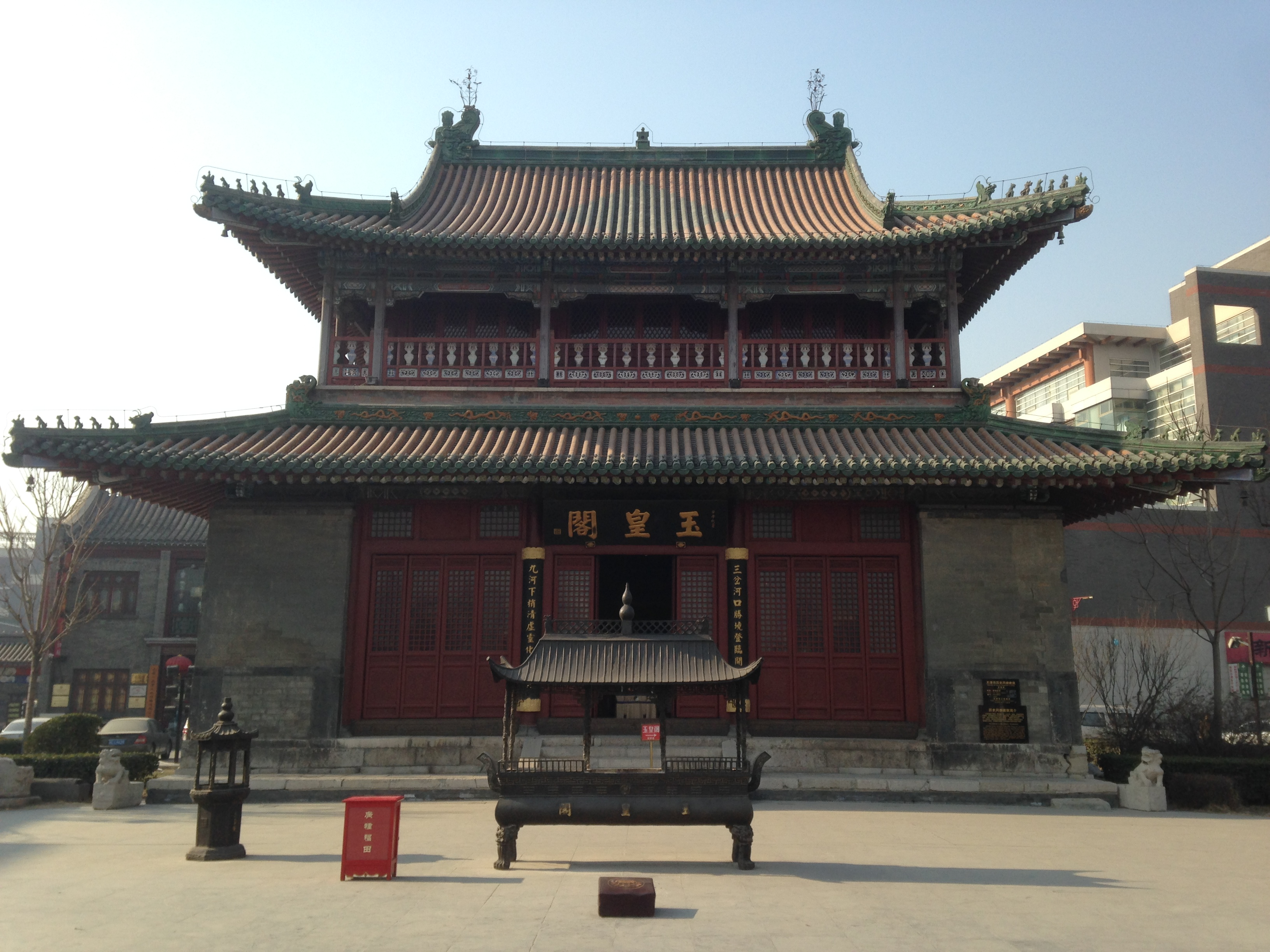
Temple of the Jade Deity in Tianjin

Yùdì (玉帝; "Jade Deity" or "Jade Emperor", or 玉皇; Yùhuáng; "Jade King", is a personification of the supreme God of Heaven in popular religion. More elaborate names for the Jade Deity include Yùhuáng Shàngdì (玉皇上帝; "Highest Deity the Jade King") and Yùhuángdàdì (玉皇大帝; "Great Deity the Jade King"), while among the common people he is intimately referred to as the "Lord of Heaven" (天公; Tiāngōng).

He is also present in Taoist theology, where, however, he is not regarded as the supreme principle though he has a high position in the pantheon. In Taoism his formal title is the "Most Honourable Great Deity the Jade King in the Golden Tower of the Clear Heaven" (昊天金阙至尊玉皇大帝; Hàotiān Jīnquē Zhìzūn Yùhuángdàdì), and he is one of the Four Sovereigns, the four deities proceeding directly from the Three Pure Ones, which in Taoism are the representation of the supreme principle.

The eminence of the Jade Deity is relatively recent, emerging in popular religion during the Tang dynasty (618–907) and becoming established during the Song dynasty (960–1279), especially under Emperor Zhenzong and Emperor Huizong of Song. By the Tang dynasty the name of "Jade King" had been widely adopted by the common people to refer to the God of Heaven, and this got the attention of the Taoists who integrated the deity in their pantheon. The cult of the Jade Deity became so widespread that during the Song dynasty it was proclaimed by imperial decree that this popular conception of God was the same supreme God of Heaven whom the elites had the privilege to worship at the Temple of Heaven.

There are a great number of temples in China dedicated to the Jade Deity (玉皇庙; yùhuángmiào or 玉皇阁; yùhuánggé, et al.), and his birthday on the 9th day of the first month of the Chinese calendar is one of the biggest festivals. He is also celebrated on the 25th day of the 12th month, when he is believed to turn to the human world to inspect all goods and evils to determine awards or punishments. In everyday language the Jade Deity is also called the "Olden Heavenly Father" (老天爷; Lǎotiānyé) and simply Heaven.

=== Taidi ===
Tàidì (太帝; "Utmost Deity" or "Great Deity"), is another name that has been used to describe the supreme God in some contexts. It appears in the mystical narratives of the Huainanzi where the supreme God is associated with Mount Kunlun, the axis mundi.

=== Shen ===
神; Shén is a general concept meaning "spirit", and usually defines the plurality of gods in the world, however, in certain contexts it has been used as singular denoting the supreme God, the "being that gives birth to all things".

Concepts including shen expressing the idea of the supreme God include:

- Tiānshén (天神; "God of Heaven"), interpreted in the Shuowen Jiezi (說文解字) as "the being that gives birth to all things";
- Shénhuáng (神皇; "God the King"), attested in Taihong ("The Origin of Vital Breath").

Shéndào (神道; "Way of the God[s]")), in the Yijing, is the path or way of manifestation of the supreme God and the gods of nature.

It is too delicate to be grasped. It cannot be perceived through reason. It cannot be seen through the eyes. It does without knowing how it can do. This is what we call the Way of the God[s].

Since the Qin and Han dynasty, "Shendao" became a descriptor for the "Chinese religion" as the shèjiào (社教; "social religion") of the nation. The phrase Shéndào shèjiào (神道設教) literally means "established religion of the way of the gods".

=== Zi ===
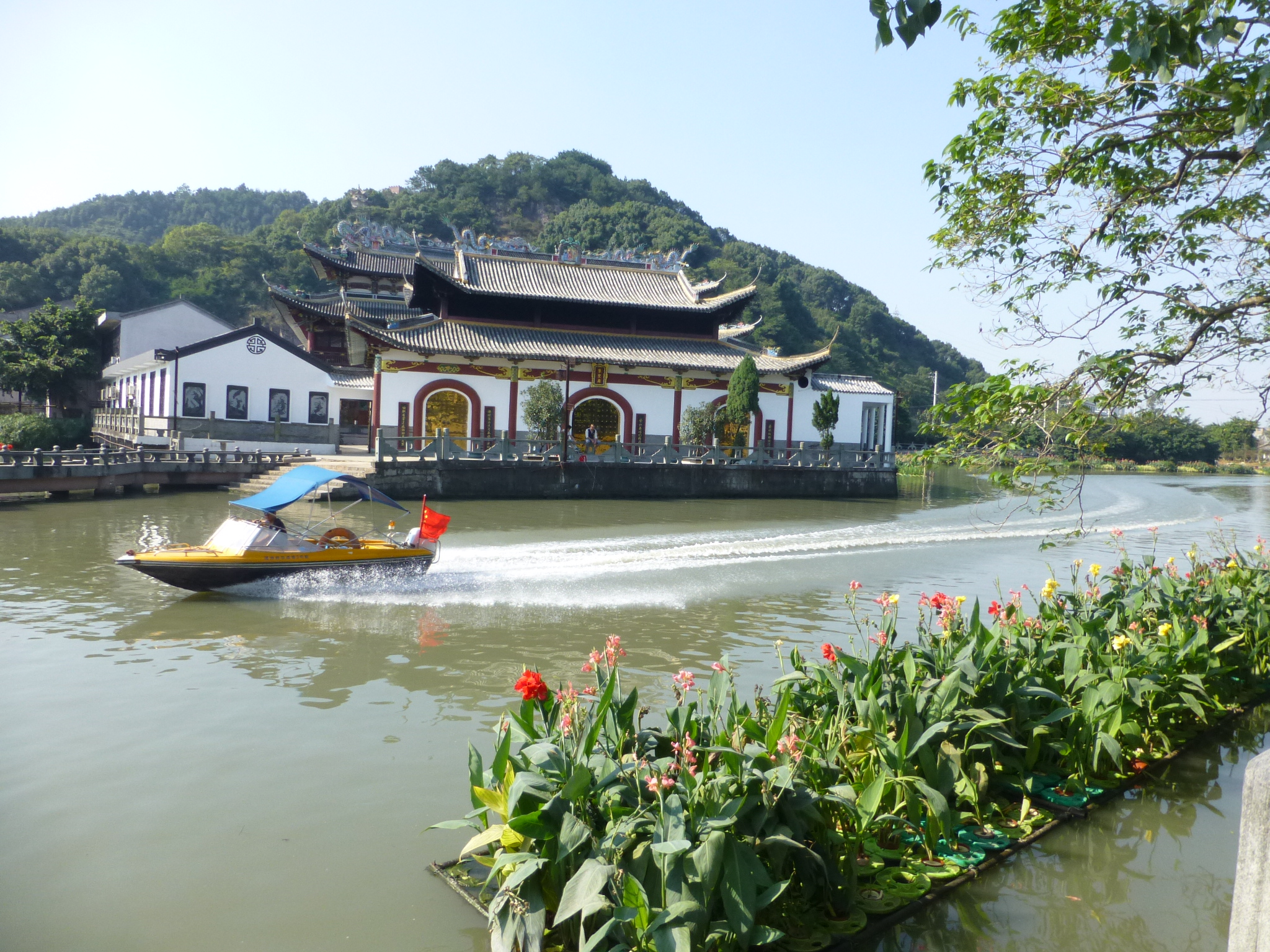
A temple of popular religion in Nanbaixiang, Ouhai, Wenzhou, Zhejiang. The facade of the left side building features the modern stylisation of the 禄; lù / 子; zi symbol →.

子; Zi, literally meaning "son", "(male) offspring", is another concept associated with the supreme God of Heaven as the north celestial pole and its spinning stars. 字; Zì, meaning "word" and "symbol", is one of its near homophonous and graphic cognates. It was the surname used by the royal lineage of the Shang dynasty. It is a component of concepts including 天子; Tiānzǐ; "Son of Heaven" and 君子; jūnzǐ ("son of a lord", which in Confucianism became the concept of morally perfected person). According to Didier, in Shang and Zhou forms, the grapheme zi itself depicts someone linked to the godhead of the squared north celestial pole (口; Dīng), and is related to 中; zhōng, the concept of spiritual, and thus political, centrality.

Olden versions of the graphemes for zi and zhong

1

2

3

4

5

6

7

8

9

Images 1 to 4 are Shang versions of the grapheme k:子; zi. Images 5 to 8 are archaic versions of the grapheme k:中; zhōng; "centrality", "middle", "inside", "within". Respectively, from left to right, the latter are in Shang bronzeware script, Qin bamboo and wooden slips script, one of the versions recorded in the Han Shuowen Jiezi, and Han small seal script.
According to John C. Didier, both zi and zhong graphemes express spiritual filiation and alignment with the supreme godhead of the north celestial pole. They share the graphic element representing the celestial square itself (口; Dīng) and the ritual vessel and ritual space used to mimic it on earth, and thus commune with it, establishing spiritual and political centrality.
Image 9 is a Shang version of k:字; zì; "word" and "symbol", representing a "son" enshrined under a "roof".

In modern Chinese popular religion, zi is a synonym of lù (禄; "prosperity", "furthering", "welfare"). Lùxīng (禄星; "Star of Prosperity") is Mizar, a star of the Big Dipper (Great Chariot) constellation which rotates around the north celestial pole; it is the second star of the "handle" of the Dipper. Luxing is conceived as a member of two clusters of gods, the Sānxīng (三星; "Three Stars") and the Jiǔhuángshén (九皇神; "Nine God-Kings"). The latter are the seven stars of the Big Dipper with the addition of two less visible ones thwartwise the "handle", and they are conceived as the ninefold manifestation of the supreme God of Heaven, which in this tradition is called Jiǔhuángdàdì (九皇大帝; "Great Deity of the Nine Kings"), Xuántiān Shàngdì (玄天上帝; "Highest Deity of the Dark Heaven"), or Dòufù (斗父; "Father of the Chariot"). The number nine is for this reason associated with the yang masculine power of the dragon, and celebrated in the Double Ninth Festival and Nine God-Kings Festival. The Big Dipper is the expansion of the supreme principle, governing waxing and life (yang), while the Little Dipper is its reabsorption, governing waning and death (yin). The mother of the Jiuhuangshen is Dǒumǔ (斗母; "Mother of the Chariot"), the female aspect of the supreme.

The stars are consistent regardless of the name in different languages, cultures, or viewpoint on Earth's Northern/Southern hemisphere with the same sky, sun, stars, and moon

== Theology of the schools ==
As explained by Stephan Feuchtwang, the fundamental difference between Confucianism and Taoism lies in the fact that the former focuses on the realisation of the starry order of Heaven in human society, while the latter on the contemplation of the Dao which spontaneously arises in nature. Taoism also focuses on the cultivation of local gods, to centre the order of Heaven upon a particular locality.

=== Confucian theology ===
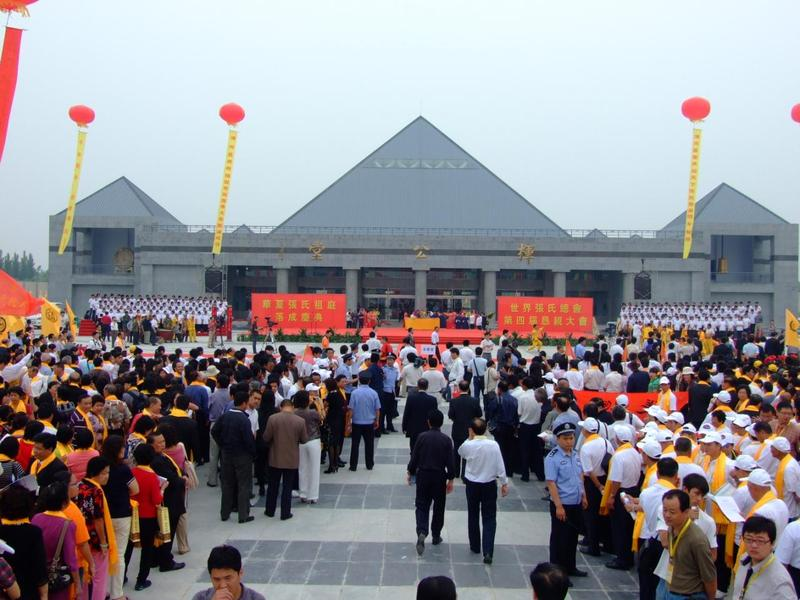
Worship at the Great Temple of Lord Zhang Hui (张挥公大殿; Zhāng Huī gōng dàdiàn), the cathedral ancestral shrine of the Zhang lineage corporation, at their ancestral home in Qinghe, Hebei

Large seal

Small seal

Olden versions of the grapheme rú (儒; "scholar", "refined one", "Confucian"). It is composed of 人; rén; "man" and 需; xū; "to await", itself composed of yǔ (雨; "rain", "instruction") and ér (而; "sky"), graphically a "man under the rain". Its full meaning is "man receiving instruction from Heaven". According to Kang Youwei, Hu Shih, and Yao Xinzhong, they were the official shaman-priests (巫; wū) experts in rites and astronomy of the Shang, and later Zhou, dynasty.

Confucius (551–479 BCE) emerged in the critical Warring States period as a reformer of the religious tradition inherited from the Shang and Zhou dynasties. His elaboration of ancient theology gives centrality to self-cultivation and human agency, and to the educational power of the self-established individual in assisting others to establish themselves (the principle of 愛人; àirén; "loving others").

Philosophers in the Warring States compiled the Analects and formulated the classic metaphysics which became the lash of Confucianism. In accordance with the Master, they identified mental tranquility as the state of Tian, or the One (一; Yī), which in each individual is the Heaven-bestowed divine power to rule one's own life and the world. Going beyond the Master, they theorised the oneness of production and reabsorption into the cosmic source, and the possibility to understand and therefore re-attain it through meditation. This line of thought would have influenced all Chinese individual and collective-political mystical theories and practices thereafter.

Fu Pei-Jun characterises the Heaven of ancient Confucianism, before the Qin dynasty, as "dominator", "creator", "sustainer", "revealer" and "judge". The Han-dynasty Confucian scholar Dong Zhongshu (179–104 BCE) described Heaven as "the supreme God possessing a will". In the Song dynasty, Neo-Confucianism, especially the major exponent Zhu Xi (1130–1200), generally rationalised the theology, cosmology, and ontology inherited from the foregoing tradition. Neo-Confucian thinkers reaffirmed the unity of the "heavenly city" and the earthly "divine city"; the city that the God of Heaven morally organises in the natural world through humanity is not ontologically separate from Heaven itself, so that the compound "Heaven-Earth" (天地; Tiāndì) is another name of the God of Heaven itself in Neo-Confucian texts. Heaven contains Earth as part of its nature, and the myriad things are begotten (生; shēng) by Heaven and raised up (養; yǎng) by Earth. Neo-Confucians also discussed Heaven under the term Tàijí (太极; "Great Pole").

Stephan Feuchtwang says that Confucianism consists of the search for "middle ways" between yin and yang in each new configuration of the world, to align reality with Heaven through rites. The order of Heaven is emphasised; it is a moral power and fully realises in patriarchy, that is to say, the worship of progenitors, in the Han tradition in the male line, who are considered to have embodied Heaven. This conception is put into practice as the religious worship of progenitors in the system of ancestral shrines, dedicated to the deified progenitors of lineages (groups of families sharing the same surname). The philosopher Promise Hsu identifies Tian as the foundation of a civil theology of China.

==== Three models ====
Huang Yong (2007) has discerned three models of theology in the Confucian tradition:

- (i) Theology of Heaven as discussed in the Confucian canonical texts, the Classic of History, the Classic of Poetry, and the Analects of Confucius, as a transcendent concept of God similar to the conception of God in the Hellenistic and Abrahamic traditions;
- (ii) Theology of Heaven in contemporary New Confucianism, represented especially by Xiong Shili, Mou Zongsan, and Tu Weiming, as an "immanently transcendent" God, the ultimate reality immanent in the world to transcend the world;
- (iii) Theology of Heaven in Neo-Confucianism, particularly the Cheng brothers in the Song dynasty, as the wonderful life-giving activity transcending the world within the world.

===== Canonical theology =====
The supreme power in Confucianism is Tian, Shangdi, or Di in the early or classic Confucian tradition, later also discussed in its activity as 天理; Tiānlǐ or 天道; Tiāndào, the "Order of Heaven" or "Way of Heaven" by Neo-Confucians. A number of scholars support the theistic reading of early Confucian texts. In the Analects, Heaven is treated as a conscious and providential being concerned not only with the human order in general, but with Confucius' own mission in particular. Confucius claimed to be a transmitter of an ancient knowledge rather than a renovator.

In Confucianism, God has not created man in order to neglect him, but is always with man, and sustains the order of nature and human society, by teaching rulers how to be good to secure the peace of the countries. The theistic idea of early Confucianism gave later way to a depersonalisation of Heaven, identifying it as the pattern discernible in the unfolding of nature and his will (Tianming) as peoples' consensus, culminating in the Mencius and the Xunzi.

===== Immanent transcendence =====
Contemporary New Confucian theologians have resolved the ancient dispute between the theistic and nontheistic, immanent and transcendent interpretations of Tian, elaborating the concept of "immanent transcendence" (内在超越; nèizài chāoyuè), contrasting it with the "external transcendence" (外在超越; wàizài chāoyuè) of the God of Christianity. While the God of the Christians is outside the world that he creates, the God of the Confucians is immanent in the world to call for the transcendence of the given situation, thus promoting an ongoing transformation.

The first theologian to discuss immanent transcendence was Xiong Shili. According to him, noumenon (体; tǐ) and phenomenon (用; yòng) are not separate, but the noumenon is right within the phenomenon. At the same time, the noumenon is also transcendent, not in the sense that it has independent existence, separated from the "ten thousand things", but in the sense that it is the substance of all things. As the substance, it is transcendent because it is not transformed by the ten thousand things but is rather their master: it "transcends the surface of things". By transcending the surface, one realises the self-nature (自性神; zì xìng shén) of himself and of all things; to the extent that a thing has not fully realised its own self-nature, God is also that on which any particular thing or human being depends (依他神; yī tā shén).

According to the further explanations of Xiong's student Mou Zongsan, Heaven is not merely the sky, and just like the God of the Judaic and Hellenistic-Christian tradition, it is not one of the beings in the world. However, unlike the God of Western religions, the God of Confucianism is not outside the world either, but is within humans—who are the primary concern of Confucianism—and within other beings in the world. Tian is the ontological substance of reality, it is immanent in every human being as the human nature (ren); however, the human being on the phenomenal level is not identical with its metaphysical essence. Mencius stated that "the one who can fully realise one's heart–mind can understand one's nature, and the one who can understand one's own nature can know Tian". This means that Tian is within the human being, but before this last comes to realise his true heart–mind, or know his true nature, Heaven still appears transcendent to him. Mou cites Max Muller saying that "a human being itself is potentially a God, a God one presently ought to become", to explain the idea of the relationship of God and humanity in Confucianism and other Eastern religions. What is crucial is to transcend the phenomenon to reach Tian.

Mou makes an important distinction between Confucianism and Christianity: the latter does not ask one to become a Christ, because the nature of Christ is unreachable for ordinary humans, who are not conceived as having a divine essence; by contrast, in Confucianism, sages who have realised Tian teach to others how to become sages and worthy themselves, since Heaven is present in everyone and may be cultivated. Mou defines Confucianism as a "religion of morality", a religion of the "fulfillment of virtues", whose meaning lies in seeking the infinite and the complete in the finitude of earthly life.

Tu Weiming, a student of Mou, furtherly develops the theology of "immanent transcendence". By his own words:

A person is in this world and yet does not belong to this world. He regards this secular world as divine only because he realizes the divine value in this secular world. Here the secular world in which the divinity is manifested is not a world separate from the divinity, and the divinity manifested in the secular is not some Ideal externally transcendent of the secular world.

According to Tu, the more man may penetrate his own inner source, the more he may transcend himself. By the metaphorical words of Mencius (7a29), this process is like "digging a well to reach the source of water". It is for this emphasis on transcending the phenomena to reach the true self, which is the divine, that Tu defines Confucian religiosity as the "ultimate self-transformation as a communal act and as a faithful dialogical response to the transcendent"; Confucianism is about developing the nature of humanity in the right, harmonious way. Tu further explains this as a prognosis and diagnosis of humanity: "we are not what we ought to be but what we ought to be is inherent in the structure of what we are".

Heaven bids and impels humans to realise their true self. Humans have the inborn ability to respond to Heaven. One may obtain knowledge of divinity through his inner experience (tizhi), and knowledge, developing his heavenly virtue. This is a central concern of Tu's theology, at the same time intellectual and affectional—a question of mind and heart at the same time.

===== Theology of activity =====
Huang Yong has named a third approach to Confucian theology, interpreting the Neo-Confucianism of the brothers Cheng Hao (1032–1085) and Cheng Yi (1033–1107). Instead of regarding the divinity of Tian as a substance, this theology emphasises its creative "life-giving activity" (生; shēng) that is within the world in order to transcend the world itself. Also in the works of Zhou Xi, Heaven is discussed as always operating within beings in conjunction with their singular 心; xīn("heart–mind").

Neo-Confucians incorporated in Confucianism the discussion about the traditional concept of 理; Lǐ, variously translated as "form", "law", "reason", "order", "pattern", "organism", and most commonly "principle", regarding it as the supreme principle of the cosmos. The Chengs use Li interchangeably with other terms. For instance, discussing the supreme principle, Cheng Hao says that it "is called change (易; yì) with respect to its reality; is called 道; dào with respect to its li; is called divinity (神; shén) with respect to its function; and is called nature (性; xìng) with respect to it as the destiny in a person". Cheng Yi also states that the supreme principle "with respect to li it is called Heaven (天; Tiān); with respect to endowment, it is called nature, and with respect to its being in a person, it is called heart–mind". As it appears from these analogies, the Li is considered by the Chengs as identical with Heaven.

By the words of the Chengs, Huang clarifies the immanent transcendence of the Li, since it comes ontologically before things but it does not exist outside of things, or outside qi, the energy–matter of which things are made. In Chengs' theology the Li is not some entity but the "activity" of things, sheng. Explaining it through an analogy, according to the Shuowen Jiezi, Li is originally a verb meaning to work on jade. The Chengs further identify this activity as the true human nature. Sages, who have realised the true nature, are identical with the Li and their actions are identical to the creativity of the Li.

Generally, in Confucian texts, gōng (功; "work", "work of merit" or "beneficial work") and dé (德; "virtue") are frequently used to refer to the ways of becoming an honourable man of Heaven, and thus they may be regarded as attributes of Heaven itself. Zhu Xi himself characterises Heaven as extremely "active" or "vital" (健; jiàn), while the Earth is responsive (顺; shùn).

==== Humanity as the incarnation of Heaven ====
The relationship "between Heaven and mankind" (天人之際; tiānrénzhījì), that is to say how Heaven generates men and how they should behave to follow its order, is a common theme discussed in the Confucian theology of Heaven. Generally, Confucianism sees humanity, or the form-quality of the human being, 仁; rén (translatable as "benevolence", "love", "humanity"), as a quality of the God of Heaven itself, and therefore it sees humanity as an incarnation of Heaven. This theory is not at odds with the classical non-Confucian theology which views Huangdi as the incarnated God of Heaven, since Huangdi is a representation of nobility and the pursuit of Confucianism is to make all humans noble (君子; jūnzǐ) or sages and holy men (圣人; shèngrén).

According to Benjamin I. Schwartz, in the Xunzi it is explained that:

[Dissonances] between man and Heaven [are] only provisional ... the human intellect which brings order to chaos is itself an incarnation of the powers of Heaven. Heaven's working in the non-human sphere is described in a language which can almost be described as mystical. Once the normative human culture is realized, man is aligned with the harmonies of the universe.

In the "Interactions Between Heaven and Mankind" (天人感应; Tiānrén Gǎnyìng) written by the Han-dynasty scholar Dong Zhongshu, humanity is discussed as the incarnation of Heaven. Human physiological structure, thought, emotions, and moral character are all modelled after Heaven. In the Confucian discourse, ancestors who accomplished great actions are regarded as the incarnation of Heaven, and they last as a form shaping their descendants. Rén is the virtue endowed by Heaven and at the same time the means by which man may comprehend his divine nature and achieve oneness with Heaven.

==== Discourse about evil, suffering, and world renewal ====
In Confucian theology, there is no original sin, and rather humanity, as the incarnate image of Heaven's virtue, is born good (良心; liángxín; 'good heart–mind'). In Confucian theodicy, the rise of evil in a given cosmic configuration is attributed to failings in the moral organisation of qi, which depends on mankind's (or the 實踐主體; shíjiàn zhǔtǐ; "practising subject", in Zhu Xi) free will, that is to say the ability to choose whether to harmonise or not with the order of Heaven, which is part of the creature's ability to co-create with the creator.

Paraphrasing Zhu Xi:

... each human activity, found in either the mind, the body, or in both of them simultaneously, either follows principles of the just Heaven, or is corrupted by selfish appetites.

Human qi, the primordial potential substance, organises according to the yin and yang polarity in the two facets of xíng (形; "body") and shén (神; "soul"). Qi is open to both disorder (yin) and order (yang), bodily and heavenly appetites. While other creatures have a limited perfection, the human being alone has an "unlimited nature", that is to say the ability to cultivate its qi in amounts and directions of its own choice, either yin or yang. While Confucians prescribe to be moderate in pursuing appetites, since even the bodily ones are necessary for life, when the "proprietorship of corporeality" (形氣之私; xíngqì zhīsī) prevails, selfishness and therefore immorality ensue.

When evil dominates, the world falls into disaster, society shatters up, and individuals are hit by diseases, giving the way for a new heavenly configuration to emerge. By the words of Zhu Xi:

Once [Heaven] sees that human beings' immorality comes to its apex, it will crush everything up. What will be left is only a chaos, wherein all humans and things lose their being. Subsequently, a new world will emerge.

Sufferings, however, are also regarded by Confucians as a way of Heaven to refine a person preparing him for a future role. According to Mencius:

When Heaven is about to confer a great office on any man, it first exercises his mind with suffering, and his sinews and bones with toil. It exposes his body to hunger, and subjects him to extreme poverty. It confounds his undertakings. By all these methods it stimulates his mind, hardens his nature, and supplies his incompetencies.

Likewise, Zhu Xi says:

Helplessness, poverty, adversity, and obstacles can strengthen one's will, and cultivate his humanity (ren).

=== Taoist theology ===
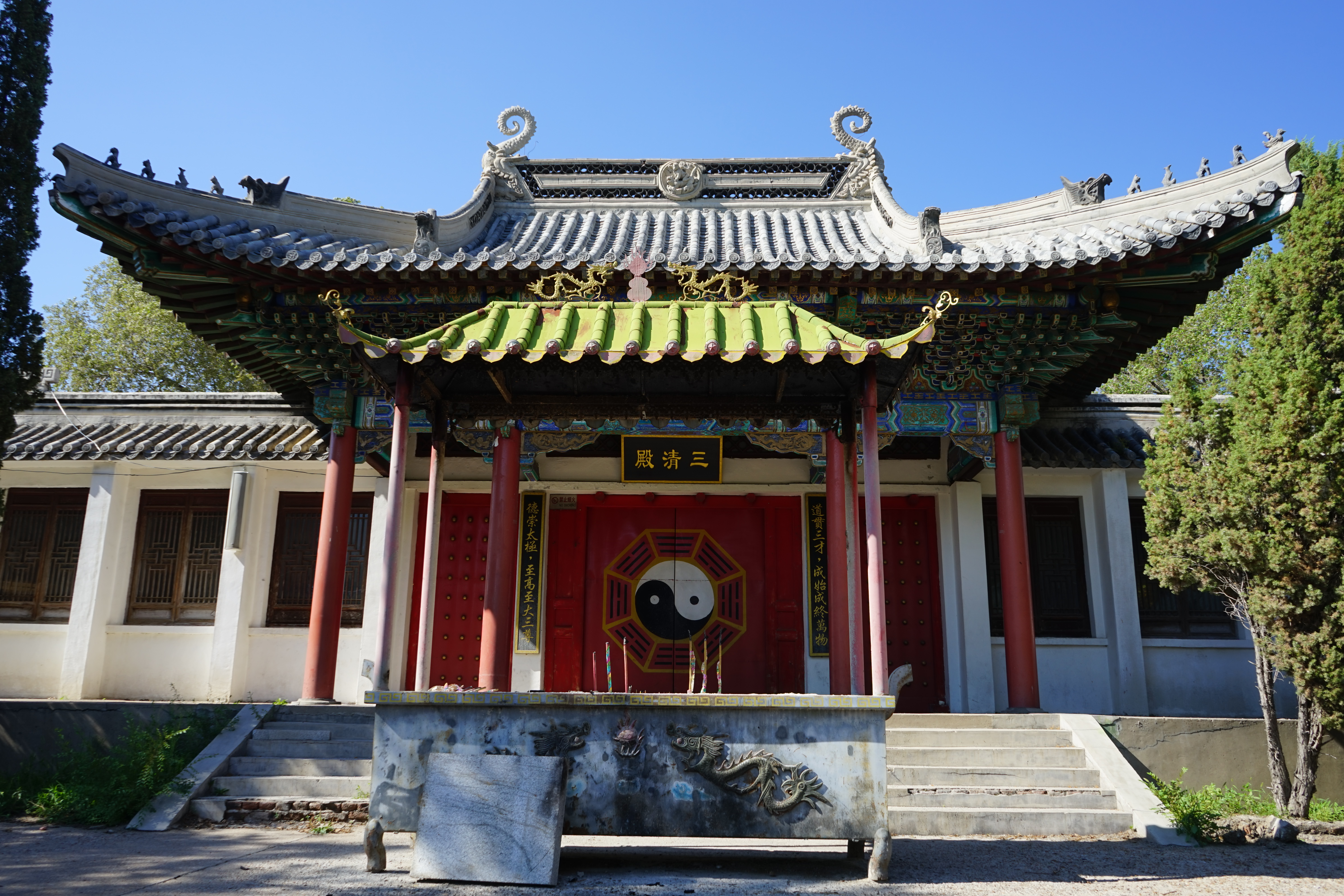
Hall of the Three Purities at the Temple of Guandi (关帝庙) of Qiqihar, Heilongjiang

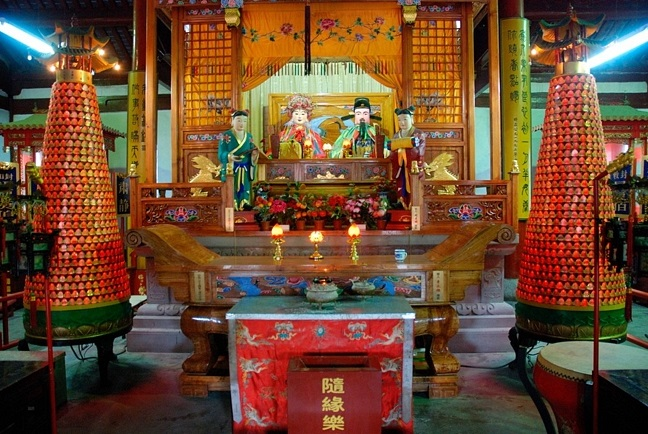
Altar to Shangdi and Dǒumǔ (斗母; "Mother of the Chariot"), representing the originating principle of the universe in masculine and feminine form, in the Chengxu Temple of Zhouzhuang, Jiangxi

Religious traditions under the label of "Taoism" have their own theologies which, characterised by henotheism, are meant to accommodate local deities in the Taoist celestial hierarchy. According to Stephan Feuchtwang, Taoism is concerned with the cultivation of local deities, bringing them in alignment with the broader cosmology, in order to "centre" through the power of rite each locality with its peculiarities. It has hermetic and lay liturgical traditions, the most practised at the popular level being those for healing and exorcism, codified into a textual corpus commissioned and approved by emperors throughout the dynasties, the Taoist Canon.

The core of Taoist theology is the concept of 道; Dào, the "Way", which is both the order of nature and the source of it. Differently from common religion or even Confucianism, Taoism espouses a negative theology declaring the impossibility to define the Dao. The core text of Taoism, the Daodejing, opens with the verses: "The Dao that can be said is not the eternal Dao, the name that can be said is not the eternal name". Feuchtwang explains the Dao as equivalent to the ancient Greek conception of physis, that is "nature" as the generation and regeneration of beings. Taoists seek "perfection", which is immortality, achieved by becoming one with the Dao, or the rhythms of nature.

Through time, Taoist theology created its own deities. Certain sects modeled their temples to dedicate to certain deities. Deities who take part in the Dao are arranged in a hierarchy. The supreme powers are three, the Three Pure Ones, and represent the centre of the cosmos and its two modalities of manifestation (yin and yang). The hierarchy of the highest powers of the cosmos is arranged as follows:

- Sānqīng (三清) — "Three Pure Ones":

- Yùqīng (玉清) — "Jade Purity";

Yuánshǐ Tiānzūn (元始天尊) — "Heavenly Honourable of the First Beginning"

- Shàngqīng (上清) — "High Purity";

Língbǎo Tiānzūn (灵宝天尊) — "Heavenly Honourable of the Numinous Treasure"

- Tàiqīng (太清) — "Supreme Purity";

Dàodé Tiānzūn (道德天尊) — "Heavenly Honourable of the Way and its Virtue", incarnated historically as Laozi

- Sìyù (四御) — "Four Sovereigns":

- Hàotiān Jīnquē Zhìzūn Yùhuáng Dàdì (昊天金阙至尊玉皇大帝) — "Most Honourable Great Deity the Jade Emperor in the Golden Tower of the Clear Heaven"
- Zhōngtiān Zǐwēi Běijí Dàdì (中天紫微北极大帝) — "Great Deity of the Purple Subtlety of the North Star at the center of Heaven"
- Gōuchén Shànggōng Tiānhuáng Dàdì (勾陈上宫天皇大帝) — "Great Deity the Heavenly King in the High Palace at the Old Hook"
- Chéngtiān Xiàofǎ Tǔhuáng Deqí (承天效法土皇地祇) — "Land Appeasing Soil Ruler who Imitates the Law which Sustains Heaven", who is the goddess Hòutǔ

== Trends in modern Chinese political and civil theology ==
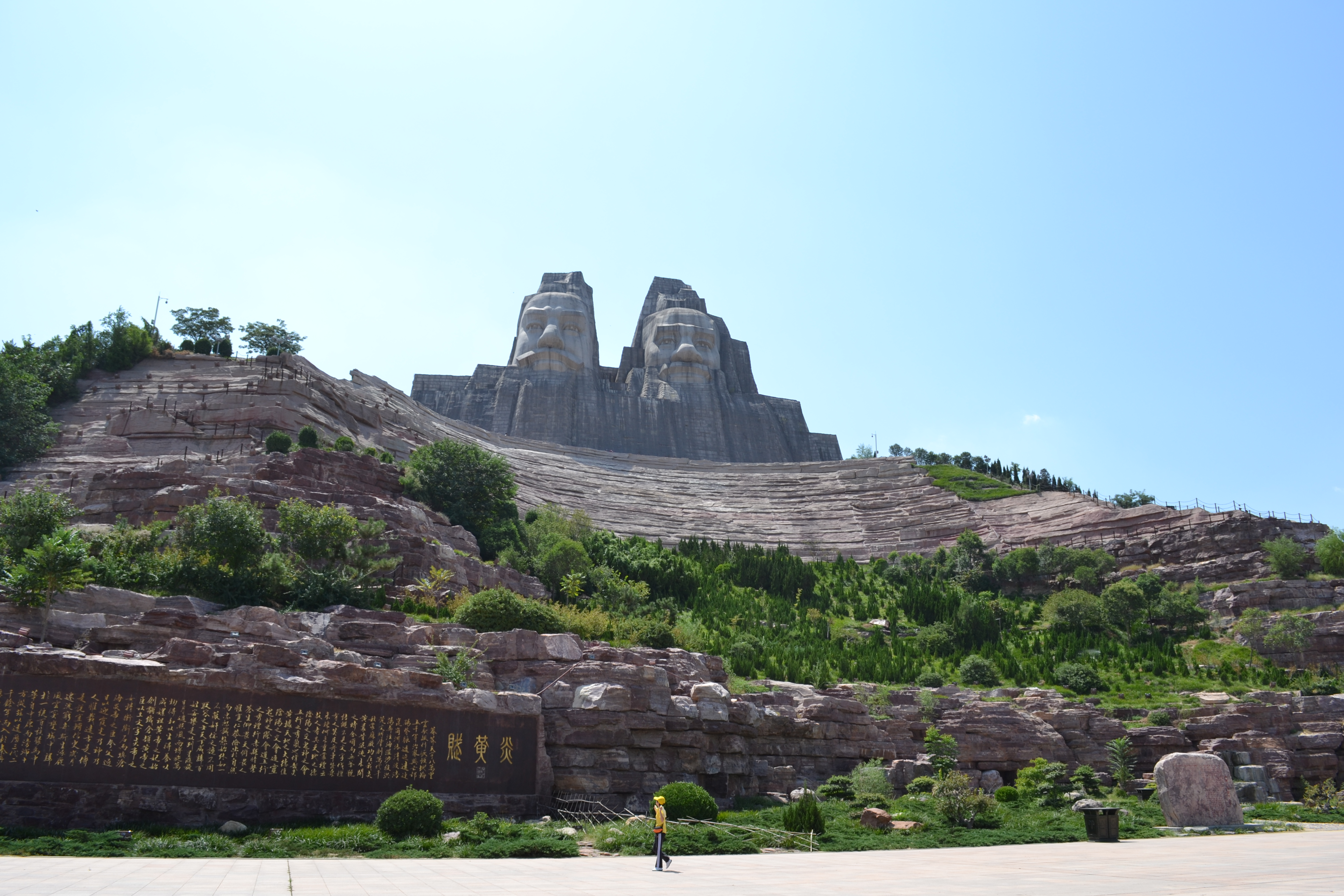
Statues of the Yellow Deity and the Red Deity carved in the rock at a ceremonial complex in Zhengzhou, Henan

Interest in traditional Chinese theology has waxed and waned throughout the dynasties of the history of China. For instance, the Great Leap Forward enacted in the mid-20th century involved the outright destruction of traditional temples in accordance with Maoist ideology. From the 1980s onwards a revival has taken place, with public sacrifices held at temples meant to renew the perceived alliance between community leaders and the gods. Most people in China today take part in some rituals and festivals, especially those around the lunar new year, and culture heroes like the Yellow Emperor are celebrated by the contemporary Chinese government.

Even Chinese Buddhism, a religion which originally came from abroad, adapted to common Chinese cosmology by paralleling its concept of a triune supreme with Shakyamuni, Amithaba, and Maitreya, representing respectively enlightenment, salvation, and post-apocalyptic paradise. The Tathātā (真如; zhēnrú; "suchness") is generally identified as the supreme being itself.

In the wake of Gottfried Wilhelm Leibniz, many scholars understand Confucian theology as a natural theology. The Chinese theological conception of the God of Heaven's ongoing self-creation/evolution in the "divine city" and the broader cosmos is contrasted with that of God as a craftsman external to his creation which is the type of theism of Christianity. Contemporary scholars also compare Confucianism and Christianity on the matters of humanity's good nature and of pneumatology, that is to say the respective doctrines of the shen dynamism produced by God's activity (guishen) and of the Holy Spirit, finding that the Confucian doctrine is truly humanistic since the spirit is the creative dynamism always present in humanity, while in the Christian doctrine, the Holy Spirit ultimately belongs to God alone. According to the philosopher Promise Hsu, in the wake of Eric Voegelin, while Christianity fails to provide a public, civil theology, Confucianism with its idea of Tian, within broader Chinese cosmological religion, is particularly apt to fill the void left by the failing of Christianity. Paraphrasing Varro, Hsu says:

A society exists concretely, with regard to space, time, and human beings. Their organizational form and its symbols are sacred in their concreteness, regardless of ... speculations about their meaning.

Quoting from Ellis Sandoz's works, Hsu says:

Civil theology consists of propositionally stated true scientific knowledge of the divine order. It is the theology discerned and validated through reason by the philosopher, on the one hand, and through common sense and the logique du Coeur evoked by the persuasive beauty of mythic narrative and imitative representations, on the other hand.

Also, Joël Thoraval characterises the common Chinese religion, or what he calls a "popular Confucianism", which has powerfully revived since the 1980s, consisting of the widespread belief and worship of five cosmological entities—Heaven and Earth (地; Di), the sovereign or the government (君; jūn), ancestors (親; qīn), and masters (師; shī)—as China's civil religion.

== Chinese gods and immortals ==
The gods and immortals (神仙) believed in by Taoism and Chinese mythology can be roughly divided into two categories, namely "gods" and "xian". The former group is made up of many entities who reveal, imitate, and propagate the way of heaven. These entities include the god of heaven (天神), the god of ground (地祇), wuling (物灵: animism, the spirit of all things), the god of the netherworld (地府神灵), the god of human body (人体之神), the god of the human ghost (人鬼之神), etc. The xian (immortals), on the other hand, are usually understood as humans who have attained immortality through the cultivation of the Tao.

== See also ==
- Chinese spiritual world concepts
- Three teachings

=== Related cultures ===
- Amenominakanushi
- Haneullim
- Tengri

=== Abrahamic syncretism ===
- Han Kitab
- Sino-Christian theology
