= Great Emperor =

Great Emperor may refer to:

== Chinese mythology ==
- Great Emperor of Jade, a name of the Jade Emperor
- Great Emperor of Medicine, a name of Shennong (a.k.a. Shennong the Great Emperor)
- Great Emperor of Polaris, a sky deity in Taoism

== Other uses ==
- Great Emperor, a rescue tug that towed HMS Kelly (F01)
- Great Khan, a translation of Yekhe Khagan (transl. Great Emperor)
- Kwanggeto Taewang (transl. The Great Emperor), a 2004 animated film by South Korean director Kim Cheong-gi
- Maha Chakkraphat, 16th-century king of the Ayutthaya Kingdom
