= George Harold Dunne =

American theologian (1905–1998)

- Born: March 11, 1905; St. Louis, Missouri, U.S.
- Died: June 30, 1998 (aged 93); Los Gatos, California, U.S.
- Occupation: Theologian

George Harold Dunne (March 11, 1905 – June 30, 1998) was an American theologian and Jesuit priest.

== Life ==
He was born on March 11, 1905 in St. Louis, Missouri in the United States. His relatives were the writers John Gregory Dunne and Dominick Dunne.

In the later stages of his life, he lived among the Jesuit community at Loyola Marymount University. He died on June 30, 1998 in Los Gatos, California, outside San Jose in California, United States.

He never married. He was survived by his six nieces and two nephews.

== Education ==
Dunne was a student of Chinese theology and language. He attended law school at Loyola Marymount University, from where he graduated in 1926.

He completed his master's degree from Gonzaga University in 1932. He received a doctorate in international relations in 1944 from the University of Chicago.

== Career ==
Dunne's first academic position was at the Saint Louis University, but his criticism of the policies of racial segregation at the university resulted in his dismissal. He then transferred to Loyola University in Los Angeles, where he was dismissed again, this time because of his support of a strike of the stage employees' union. He eventually served at Georgetown University and became the director of the university's program at Fribourg, Switzerland.

He retired from his teaching career in 1985. He was a longtime contributor to America, a Jesuit review magazine.

== Legacy ==
He was an outspoken critic of racial segregation in the United States way back in the 1940s when most of mainstream America was in favor of racial segregation. His belief in racial equality led him to be the first director of the ecumenical Committee on Society, Development, and Peace.

He is also remembered today for his book Generation of Giants: The Story of the Jesuits in China in Ming Dynasty, which recounted the story of early Jesuit missions in China to a wider audience.

== Bibliography ==
He is the author of a number of notable books:

- King's Pawn: The Memoirs of George H. Dunne - King's pawn : the memoirs of George H. Dunne
- Generation of Giants: The Story of the Jesuits in China in Ming Dynasty - Generation of giants; the story of the Jesuits in China in the last decades of the Ming dynasty
- The right to development: Topics in moral argument - The right to development
- Religion and American Democracy: A Reply to Paul Blanshard's Letter - Religion and American democracy : a reply to Paul Blanshard's American freedom and Catholic power
- Catholic Social Doctrine and World Peace
- Christian Advocacy and Labor Strife in Hollywood

=== Generation of Giants ===
The book Generation of Giants: The Story of the Jesuits in China in Ming Dynasty is perhaps his most notable work. In 1926, he entered the Jesuits, and in 1932 was sent to China where he worked for four years. The experience would later be reflected in the book Generation of Giants, about the inculturating efforts of early Jesuit missionaries to China like Matteo Ricci.
