= Three Great Emperor-Officials =

Three of the highest deities of Taoism

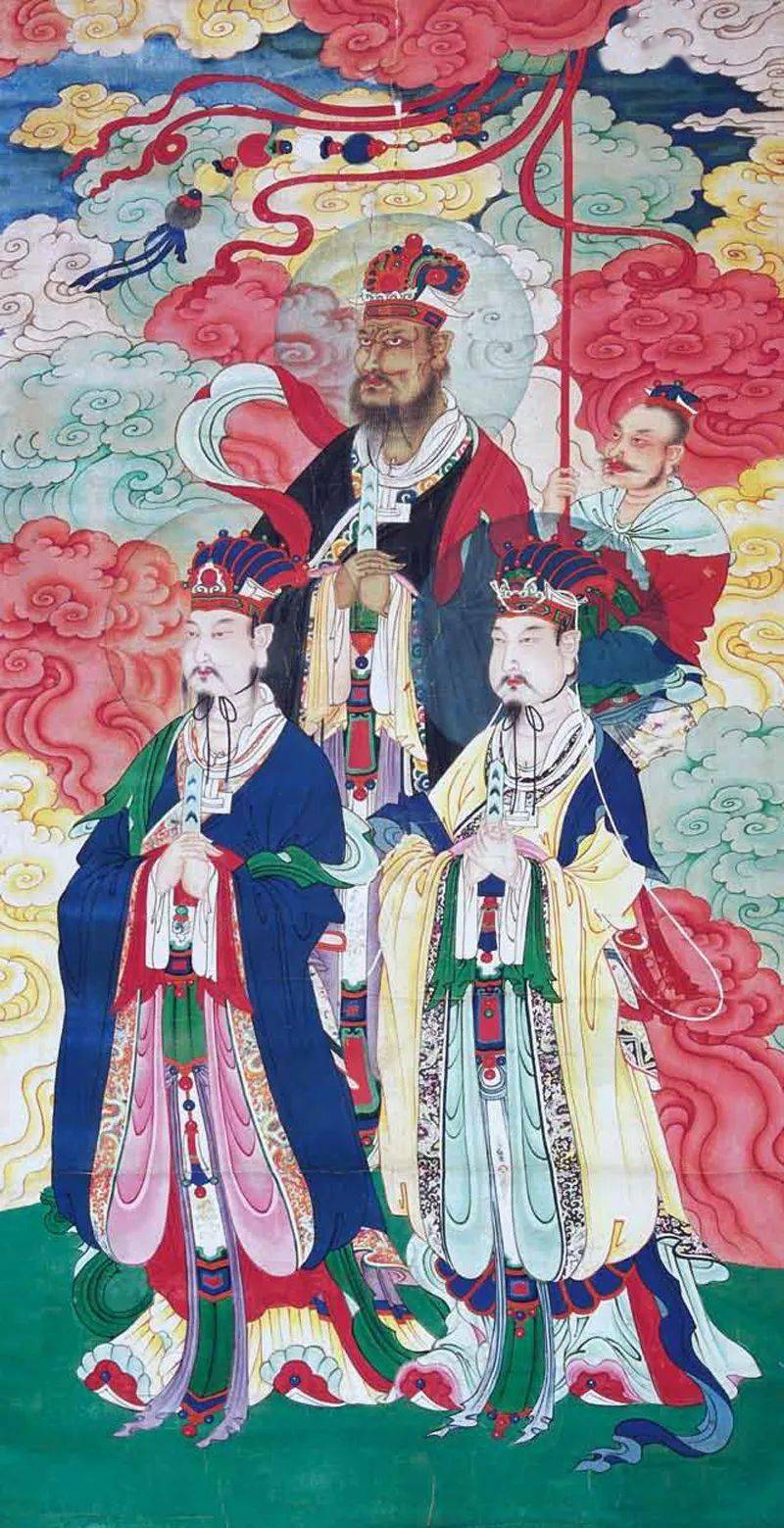
- Painting of the Three Great Emperor-Officials in the White Cloud Temple of Beijing
- Chinese: 三官大帝
- Literal meaning: Three Great Emperor-Officials
Transcriptions
Standard Mandarin
- Hanyu Pinyin: Sānguān Dàdì
- Bopomofo: ㄙㄢ ㄍㄨㄢ ㄉㄚˋ ㄉㄧˋ
- Wade–Giles: San^{1}-kuan^{1} Ta^{4}-ti^{4}
- IPA: [sán.kwán tâ.tî]
Yue: Cantonese
- Yale Romanization: Sāamgūn Daaihdai
- Jyutping: Saam^{1}-gun^{1} Daai^{6}-dai^{3}
- IPA: [sam˥.kun˥ taj˨.tɐj˧]

The Three Great Emperor-Officials (Chinese: 三官大帝; pinyin: Sānguān Dàdì), Sanguan, or the Three Officials are three of the highest shen in some branches of religious Taoism, and subordinate only to the Jade Emperor (玉帝; Yùdì). The Three Great Emperor-Officials are the "Heavenly Official" (天官; Tiānguān), the "Earthly Official" (地官; Dìguān) and the "Water Official" (水官; Shuǐguān). They administer all phenomena in the three spheres and were thought to be able to take away sin.

Chinese playwrights popularized the worship of these gods by including a skit before plays with shared themes between each performance called The Official of Heaven Brings Happiness.

They have been worshipped since the second century CE.

== Full titles ==
- The Heavenly Official, full title "the Heavenly Official of Higher Origin and First-Rank Who Bestows Blessings" (上元一品賜福天官; Shàngyuán Yīpǐn Cìfú Tiānguān), also known as the "Great Emperor of Middle Heaven North Star" (紫微大帝; Zǐwēi Dàdì).
- The Earthly Official, full title "the Earthly Official of Middle Origin and Second-Rank Who Absolve Sins" (中元二品赦罪地官; Zhōngyuán Èrpǐn Shèzuì Dìguān), also known as the "Great Emperor of Pristine Emptiness" (清虛大帝; Qīnɡxū Dàdì).
- The Water Official, full title "the Water Official of Lower Origin and Third-Rank Who Eliminate Misfortunes" (下元三品解厄水官; Xiàyuán Sānpǐn Jiě'è Shuǐguān), also known as the "Great Emperor of Pervasive Yin" (洞陰大帝; Dòngyīn Dàdì).

== Legend ==
The Ming dynasty text Comprehensive Collection of Deities from the Three Religions (三教源流搜神大全; Sānjiào Yuánliú Shōushén Dàquán) states that the Three Officials are the three sons born to Chen Zidao and the Dragon Girl. They were enfeoffed by Yuanshi Tianzun (the Celestial Worthy of Primordial Beginning) as follows: the eldest son was titled "Shangyuan Yipin Jiuqi Tianguan Zifu Dadi" (Heavenly Official of the Upper Prime, First Rank, Nine Qi, Purple Subtlety Emperor); the second son was titled "Zhongyuan Erpin Qiqi Diguan Qingxu Dadi" (Earthly Official of the Middle Prime, Second Rank, Seven Qi, Pure Void Emperor); and the third son was titled "Xiayuan Sanpin Wuqi Shuiguan Dongyin Dadi" (Water Official of the Lower Prime, Third Rank, Five Qi, Cavernous Darkness Emperor).

The Qing dynasty text Shenxian Tongjian (Comprehensive Mirror of Immortals) identifies the Three Officials as the ancient sage-kings Yao, Shun and Yu. It states: "The Heavenly Official is Yao; the Earthly Official is Shun; and the Water Official is Yu."

== Tianguan ==
Tianguan was thought to have power over Tian or heaven and grant happiness to believers.

== Diguan ==
Diguan was the official of earth who took away sin in popular belief, although all the Sanguan were thought to be able to pardon sin to some extent, especially with their powers combined.

== Shuiguan ==
Shuiguan was the ruler of the ocean in some Taoist belief systems, and in others, he shared the same position as the Dragon King or did not exist. He was often held to "avert misfortune".
