= Shen (Chinese folk religion) =

God or spirit in Chinese religion

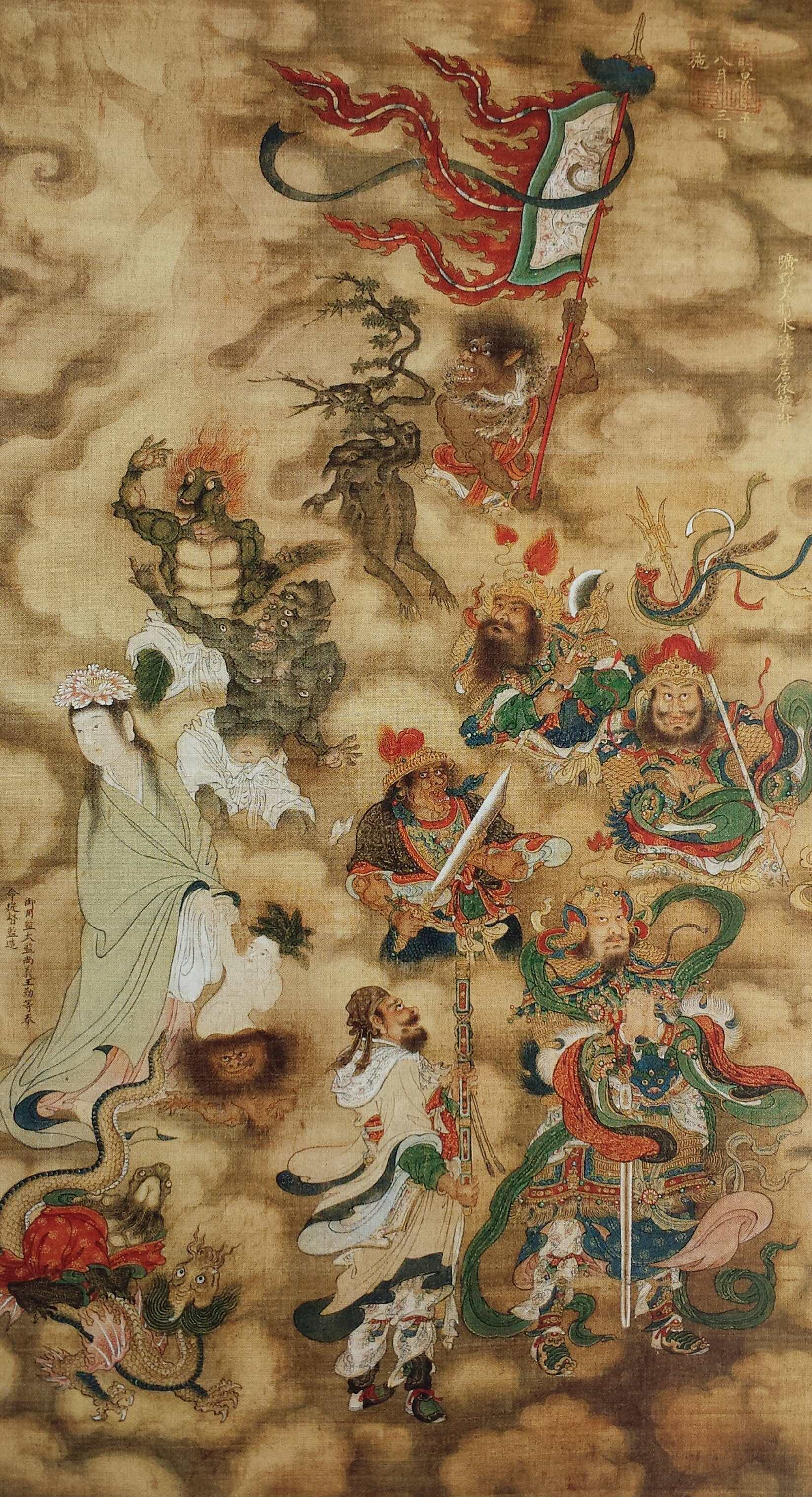
Ming dynasty Shuilu ritual painting of military and nature spirits.

Shen (Chinese: 神; pinyin: shén) is a Chinese word with senses of deities, divinities, or spirits. The Ahom equivalent is Sheng (𑜋𑜢𑜤𑜂𑜫) in Ahom religion which was originated in Yunnan also refers to deities. The Japanese equivalent is kami, as in Shintoism. This single Chinese term expresses a range of similar, yet differing, meanings.

The first meaning refers to deities which are intimately involved in the affairs of the world, or spirits, such as dead ancestors. Spirits generate entities like rivers, mountains, thunder, and stars.

A second meaning of shen refers to the human spirit or psyche that is seen in the body as luster or vigor and in the mind as vitality and enthusiasm; it is the basic power or agency within humans that accounts for life, and in order to further life to its fullest potential, the spirit (Shen) is transformed to actualize potential (精; Jing).

A third understanding of shen describes an entity as supernatural in the sense of inspiring awe or wonder because it combines categories usually kept separate, or it cannot be comprehended through normal concepts.

In the traditional Chinese theory of san jiao, shen is associated with the yang side of yin and yang and Jing is yin in comparison (Heaven and Earth; Earth tied to jing in particular in traditional Chinese medicine). Heaven is the origin of the spiritual aspect of humanity and provides ongoing spiritual influences, and therefore, it is associated with the heart, while Earth is the origin of the physical aspect of humankind/nature and is traditionally related to our kidneys or lower dantian. The ongoing harmonious interaction of Heaven and Earth creates qi in this case human and therefore is associated with the spleen, stomach and liver in the middle Jiao, which is essential to create balance and harmony of yin and yang, therefore maintaining a good standard of health and creating life.

It is said in the classics that the human is the best creation of Heaven and Earth. In traditional Chinese medicine, Taoist, Buddhist, and Chinese folk religious tradition, the balance of yin and yang is important to provide external harmony and internal health within life, thereby preventing injury, illness, or harm to body, mind, spirit, or the environment.

== Pronunciation ==
Shen
- The character as it was carved on bronze inscriptions in the Western Zhou period (11th–8th centuries BC)

Chinese name
- Chinese: 神
- Literal meaning: god, deity
Transcriptions
Standard Mandarin
- Hanyu Pinyin: shén
- Wade–Giles: shen
- IPA: [ʂə̌n]
Yue: Cantonese
- Jyutping: san^{4}
Southern Min
- Hokkien POJ: sîn
Middle Chinese
- Middle Chinese: ʑiɪn
Old Chinese
- Baxter–Sagart (2014): /*Cə.li[n]/
- Zhengzhang: /*hlin/

Vietnamese name
- Vietnamese alphabet: thần
- Chữ Hán: 神

Korean name
- Hangul: 신
- Hanja: 神
Transcriptions
- Revised Romanization: sin

Japanese name
- Kanji: 神
- Hiragana: 1. かみ; 2. しん
Transcriptions
- Revised Hepburn: 1. kami 2. shin

Shén (in rising 2nd tone) is the Modern Standard Chinese pronunciation of 神 "god, deity; spirit, spiritual, supernatural; awareness, consciousness etc". Reconstructions of shén in Middle Chinese (ca. 6th-10th centuries CE) include dź'jěn (Bernhard Karlgren, substituting j for his "yod medial"), źiɪn (Zhou Fagao), ʑin (Edwin G. Pulleyblank, "Late Middle"), and zyin (William H. Baxter). Reconstructions of shén in Old Chinese (ca. 6th-3rd centuries BCE) include *djěn (Karlgren), *zdjien (Zhou), *djin (Li Fanggui), *Ljin (Baxter), and *m-lin (Axel Schuessler).

Although the etymological origin of shen is uncertain, Schuessler notes a possible Sino-Tibetan etymology; compare Chepang gliŋh "spirit of humans".

The Chinese shen (神; "spirit; etc.") is also present in other East Asian languages. The Japanese Kanji 神 is pronounced shin (しん) or jin (じん) in On'yomi (Chinese reading), and kami (かみ), kō (こう), or tamashii (たましい) in Kun'yomi (Japanese reading). The Korean Hanja 神 is pronounced sin (신).

The Zihui dictionary notes that 神 had a special pronunciation shēn (level 1st tone, instead of usual 2nd rising tone shén) in the name Shen Shu 神荼, one of two "gods of the Eastern Sea", along with Yu Lu 鬱壘.

In the Vietnamese language, it is pronounced as thần.

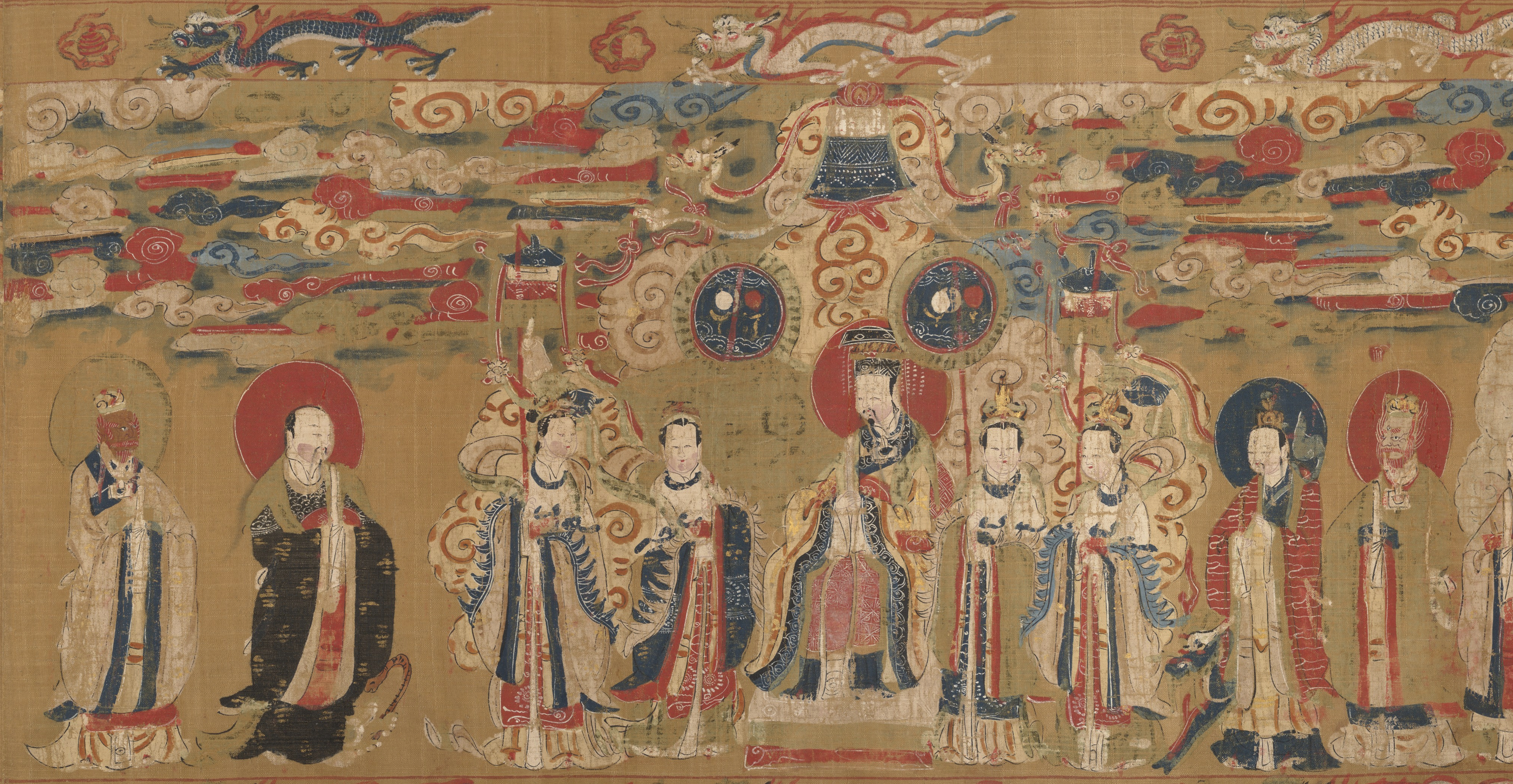
Ming dynasty painting of the canonization of Li Zhong as part of the Heavenly Pantheon under the Jade Emperor.

== Semantics ==
Shen's polysemous meanings developed diachronically over three millennia. The Hanyu dazidian, an authoritative historical dictionary, distinguishes one meaning for shēn ("a deity (神名)) and eleven meanings for shén神 translated below:

1. Celestial god(s)/spirit(s) of stories/legends, namely, the creator of the myriad things in heaven and earth and the supreme being. (传说中的天神,即天地万物的创造者和主宰者.)
2. Spirit; mind, mental faculties; consciousness. Like: concentrated attention; tire the mind; concentrate one's energy and attention. (精神.如: 凝神; 劳神; 聚精会神.)
3. Expression, demeanor; consciousness, state of mind. (表情; 神志.)
4. Portrait, portraiture. (肖像.)
5. Magical, supernatural, miraculous; mysterious, abstruse. Like: ability to divine the unknown, amazing foresight; highly skilled doctor; genius, masterpiece. (神奇; 玄妙. 如: 神机妙算; 神医; 神品.)
6. Esteem, respect; valuable, precious. (尊重; 珍贵.)
7. Rule, govern, administer. (治理.)
8. Cautious, careful, circumspect. (谨慎.)
9. Display, arrange, exhibit. (陈列.)
10. Dialect. 1. Dignity, distinction. (威风.) 2. Entrancement, ecstasy. (入神.) 3. Clever, intelligent. (聪明.)
11. Surname, family name. (姓.)

This dictionary entry for shen lists early usage examples, and many of these 11 meanings were well attested prior to the Han dynasty. Chinese classic texts use shen in meanings 1 "deity", 2 "spirit, mind; attention", 3 "expression; state of mind", 5 "supernatural", and meaning 6 "esteem". The earliest examples of meaning 4 "portrait" are in Song dynasty texts. Meanings 7-9 first occur in early Chinese dictionaries; the Erya defines shen in meanings 7 "govern" and 8 "cautious" (and 6, which is attested elsewhere), and the Guangya defines meaning 9 "display". Meaning 10 gives three usages in Chinese dialects (technically "topolects", see Fangyan). Meaning 11 "a surname" is exemplified in Shennong ("Divine Farmer"), the culture hero and inventor of agriculture in Chinese mythology.

The Chinese language has many compounds of shen. For instance, it is compounded with tian (天; "sky; heaven; nature; god") in tianshen (天神; "celestial spirits; heavenly gods; deities; (Buddhism) deva"), with shan (山; "mountain") in shanshen (山神; "mountain spirit"), and hua (話; "speech; talk; saying; story") in shenhua (神話; "mythology; myth; fairy tale"). Several shen "spirit; god" compounds use names for other supernatural beings, for example, ling (靈; "spirit; soul") in shenling (神靈; "gods; spirits, various deities"), qi (祇; "earth spirit") in shenqi (神祇; "celestial and terrestrial spirits"), xian (仙; "Xian (Taoism), transcendent") in shenxian (神仙; "spirits and immortals; divine immortal"), guai (怪; "spirit; devil; monster") in shenguai (神怪; "spirits and demons; gods and spirits"), and gui (鬼; "ghost, goblin; demon, devil") in guishen (鬼神; "ghosts and spirits; supernatural beings"). The earliest discovered character form for shen suggests two components. The right side of the character gives the basic meaning and pronunciation, as well as providing a graphic representation of flashing lightning from the clouds. This visual displays ancient people’s belief that lightning was the manifestation of god.1 The left side displays a modified character shi which pertains to ritual ceremonies, worship, or prayer. This concept originally referred to stone table used for offering ceremonial sacrifices to the gods.

Wing-Tsit Chan distinguishes four philosophical meanings of this guishen: "spiritual beings", "ancestors", "gods and demons", and "positive and negative spiritual forces".

In ancient times, shen usually refers to heavenly beings while kuei refers to spirits of deceased human beings. In later-day sacrifices, kuei-shen together refers to ancestors. In popular religions, shen means gods (who are good) and demons (who are not always good). In Neo-Confucianism, kuai-shen may refer to all these three categories but more often than not, the term refers to the activity of the material force (ch'i). Chang Tsai's dictum, "The negative spirit (kuei) and positive spirit (shen) are the spontaneous activity of the two material forces (yin and yang)," has become the generally accepted definition.

The primary meaning of shen is translatable in English as god, gods, God; deity, deities, spirit, spiritual, spiritlike, spirits, Spirit, spiritual beings; celestial spirits; ancestral spirits, supernatural beings, etc. shen is sometimes loosely translated as "soul", but Chinese hun and po distinguishes hun (魂; "spiritual soul") and po (魄; "physical soul"). shen can be used as a loanword. The Oxford English Dictionary (2nd ed.) defines shen in these terms, "In Chinese philosophy: a god, person of supernatural power, or the spirit of a dead person." shen can also refer to a living, "'spiritual' or 'spiritlike'" person or people when they accomplish things perceived to be superhuman, such as saving "people through the power of Virtue."

In acupuncture, shen is a pure spiritual energy devoid of memory and personality traits, whereas hun is the spiritual energy associated with the personality and po the energy tied to the sustenance of the physical body. In this system, shen resides in the heart and departs first at death, hun resides in the liver and departs second, and po resides in the lungs and departs last.

Various kind of Sheng are found in Ahom religion such as Chum pha rung sheng mung (the royal deity),Yashing Pha Sheng Kham, Mo' Sheng Pha Mo' Laokhri etc. Books like the astrological treatise Ban-Seng, Chicken oracle bone divination book Du Kai Sheng Moung Lit also related to Sheng. The Ahom place of worship are known as Sheng ren (The house of Seng). There's a dedicated shrine in Charaideo of Assam for the Sheng known as Roun Khun Sheng (literally House of the Sheng)

Shen plays a central role in Christian translational disputes over Chinese terms for God. Among the early Chinese "god" names, shangdi (上帝) or di was the Shang term, tian (天) was the Zhou term, and shen was a later usage (see Feng Yu-Lan. Modern terms for "God" include shangdi, zhu (主), tianzhu (天主) (esp. Catholics), and shen (神) (esp. Protestants).

== Graphics ==
The character 神 for shen exemplifies the most common class in Chinese character classification: xíngshēngzì (形聲字; "pictophonetic compounds, semantic-phonetic compounds"), which combine a radical (or classifier) that roughly indicates meaning and a phonetic that roughly indicates pronunciation. In this case, 神 combines the "altar/worship radical" 礻or 示 and a phonetic of shēn (申; "9th Earthly Branch; extend, stretch; prolong, repeat"). Compare this phonetic element differentiated with the "person radical" in shēn (伸; "stretch"), the "silk radical" in shēn (紳; "official's sash"), the "mouth radical" in shēn (呻; "chant, drone"), the "stone radical" in shēn (砷; "arsenic"), the "earth radical" in kūn (坤; "soil"), and the "big radical" in yǎn (奄; "cover"). (See the List of Kangxi radicals.)

Chinese shēn (申; "extend") was an ancient phonetic loan character for shen (神; "spirit"). The Mawangdui Silk Texts include two copies of the Dao De Jing and the "A Text" writes shen interchangeably as 申 and 神: "If one oversees all under heaven in accord with the Way, demons have no spirit. It is not that the demons have no spirit, but that their spirits do not harm people." (chap. 60). The Shuowen Jiezi defines shēn (申) as shén (神) and says that in the 7th lunar month when yin forces increase, bodies shenshu (申束; "bind up").

The earliest written forms of shen (神; "spirit; god") occur in Zhou dynasty bronzeware script and Qin dynasty seal script characters (compare the variants shown on the "Chinese etymology" link below). Although 神 has not been identified in Shang dynasty oracle bone script records, the phonetic shen (申) has. Paleographers interpret the Oracle script of 申 as a pictograph of a "lightning bolt". This was graphically differentiated between dian (電; "lightning; electricity") with the "cloud radical" and shen (神) with the "worship radical", semantically suggesting both "lightning" and "spirits" coming down from the heavens.

== See also ==
- Chinese ancestral worship
- Chinese folk religion
- Chinese gods and immortals
- Chinese theology
- Chinese spiritual world concepts
- Jade Emperor
- Kami in Shinto religion
- Sinryeong in Korean shamanism
- Religion in China
- Shangdi
- Tian & Di
- Wufang Shangdi
