= Chengxu Temple =

Taoist temple in China

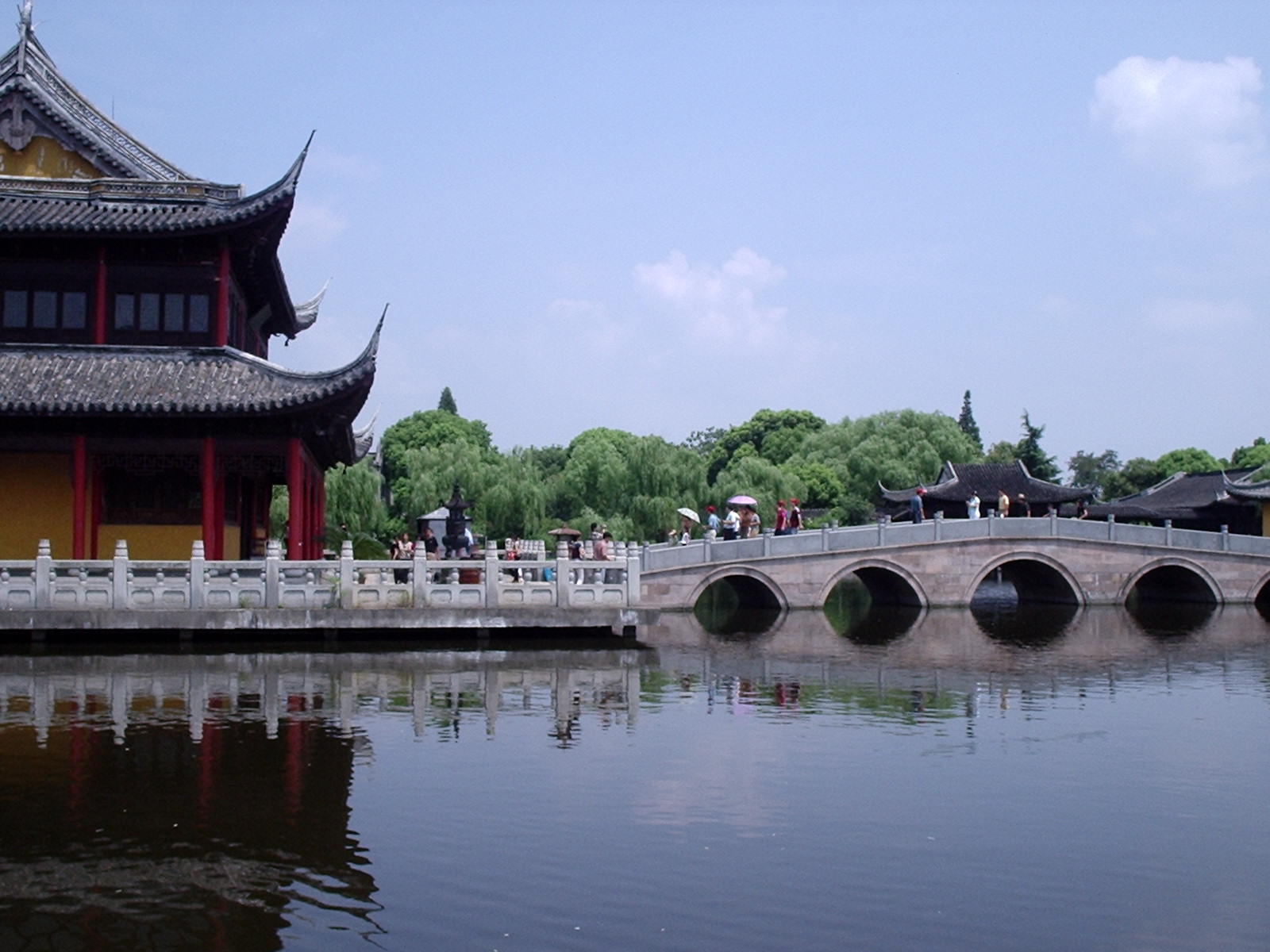
Chengxu Temple

Chengxu Temple (澄虚道院) is a Taoist temple located in Zhouzhuang which was built in 1086–1093 during the Song dynasty. Also known as Sanctity Hall (Shengtang Hall), it is located on Zhongshi Street opposite Puqing Bridge in Zhouzhuang. After several periods of expansion, it grew into one of the most notable Taoist temples in Wuzhong. With an area of 1,500 square meters (1,800 square yards), it consists of simple but majestic Shengdi and Doumu halls, Yuhuang, Wenchang and Shengdi pavilions which are masterpieces of Taoist architecture.
