= Tianhuang Emperor =

Asian deity associated with the North Star

- God of War
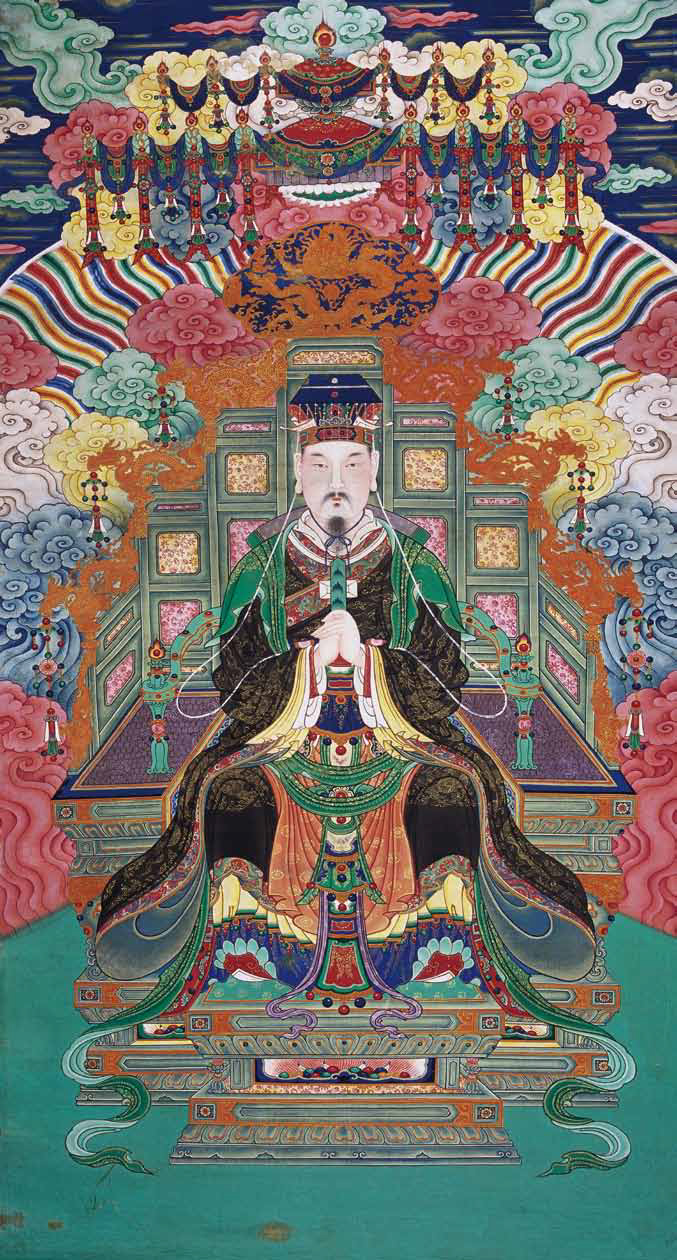
- Painting of Tianhuang Emperor
- Venerated in: Chinese folk religion Buddhism; Taoism
- Planet: Cepheus
- Gender: Male

Genealogy
- Parents: Doumu (mother)
- Siblings: Ziwei Emperor (younger brother)

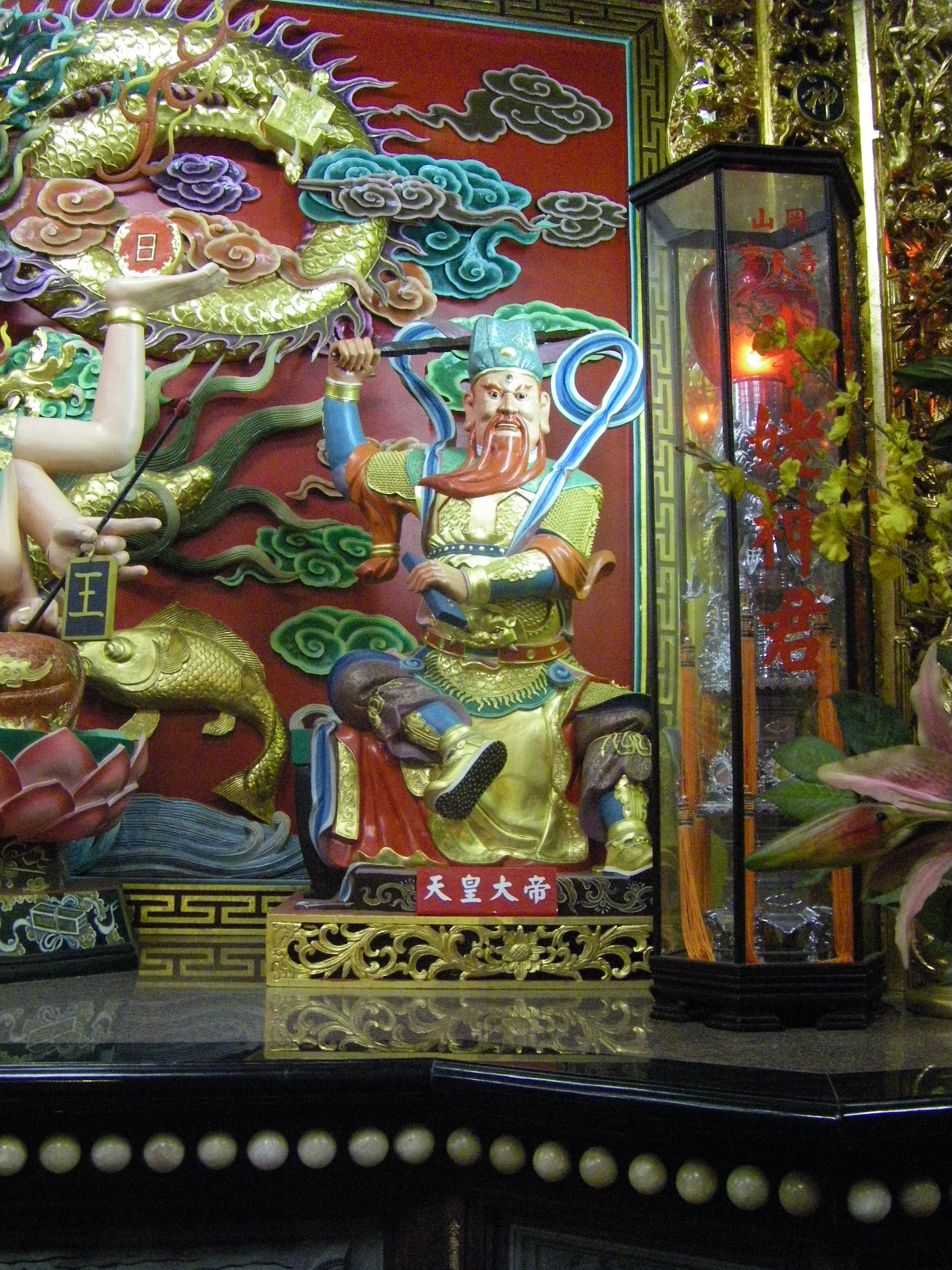
Statue of the Tianhuang Emperor (Okayama Jutian Shrine, Taiwan)

The Great Emperor of the Curved Array (Note: Full title: the Great Heavenly Emperor of the Highest Palace of the Curved Array (Chinese: 勾陈上宫天皇大帝; pinyin: gōuchén shànggōng tiānhuáng dàdì).) (Chinese: 勾陳大帝; pinyin: gōuchén dàdì), also called the Gouchen Emperor and Tianhuang Emperor, is one of the highest sky deities of Taoism. He is one of the Four Sovereigns (四御; sì yù) and is in charge of heaven, earth, and human and of wars in the human world.

== Chinese mythology ==
The "Curved Array" is a constellation in the Purple Forbidden enclosure, equivalent to the European constellation called Ursa Minor or the Little Dipper. In Taoism, the Great Emperor of Curved Array is the eldest son of Doumu and the brother of the Ziwei Emperor.

== History ==
Emperor Gaozong of Tang was called by the title Emperor Tianhuang as his Posthumous name given by Wu Zetian. Liu Yan was also given the posthumous name.

== Constellation ==
There is a constellation named after the Tianhuang Emperor.

== See also ==
- North Star
- Myōken
- Wufang Shangdi
- Four heavenly ministers
