= Four heavenly ministers =

Group of four important Daoist deities

The Four Heavenly Ministers (Chinese: 四御; pinyin: Sì yù), also translated as the Four Sovereigns, are four of the highest sky deities of Daoism and subordinate only to The Great Jade Emperor (Chinese: 玉皇大帝; pinyin: Yù huáng dàdì). They assist the Jade Emperor in administering all phenomenon of the universe. The Four Heavenly Ministers (四御 Si Yu) are four deputies assisting the Heavenly Jade Emperor in governing the heaven and earth. They are highly revered in Taoism and positioned just after the Heavenly Jade Emperor.

== Four Sovereigns ==
The Four Heavenly Ministers are:

1. the Southern Apex Longevity Great Emperor (Note: Chinese: 南極長生大帝; pinyin: nánjí chángshēng dàdì.)
2. the Great Emperor of the North Star (Polaris) in the Purple Forbidden enclosure at the center of Heaven (Tian) (Note: Chinese: 中天紫微北極太皇大帝; pinyin: zhōngtiān zǐwēi běijí tàihuáng dàdì.)
3. the Great Heavenly Emperor of the Highest Palace of the Curved Array (Little Dipper) (Note: Chinese: 勾陈上宫天皇大帝; pinyin: gōuchén shànggōng tiānhuáng dàdì.)
4. the Empress of the Earth (Note: Chinese: 后土皇地祇; pinyin: hòutǔ huáng dìqí.) (Houtu)

Southern Apex Longevity Great Emperor (南極長生大帝 Nan Ji Chang Sheng Da Di) is in charge of all spirits. He oversees the destiny and fate of humanity, commands over the various thunder spirits and bestow blessings and guidance to all sentient beings. The Great Emperor of the North Star assists the Jade Emperor in managing the sun, the moon, stars, and the climate of the four seasons. The Great Emperor of the Curved Array/Little Dipper oversees all matters in heaven, earth, and the human world. The Empress of the Earth is in charge of fertility, land, rivers, and mountains. The four heavenly ministers are often worshiped in Daoist temples.

== Six Sovereigns ==
In some later Daoist accounts, this group is extended to six. The Six Heavenly Ministers (Chinese: 六御; pinyin: liù yù) include, in addition to the prior four:

- the King Father of the East, (Note: Chinese: 東王公; pinyin: dōngwánggōng.) also called the Sovereign of the Eastern Florescence (Note: Chinese: 東華帝君; pinyin: dōnghuá dìjūn.)
- the Queen Mother of the West, (Note: Chinese: 西王母; pinyin: xīwángmǔ.) also called the Primordial Lady Golden Mother (Note: Chinese: 金母元君; pinyin: jīnmǔ yuánjūn.)

Other accounts instead add:

- the Old Man of the South Pole, (Note: Chinese: 南極老人; pinyin: nánjí lǎorén.) possibly the same as the Southern Apex Longevity Great Emperor
- the Heavenly Lord of Supreme Oneness and Salvation from Misery, (Note: Chinese: 太乙救苦天尊; pinyin: tàiyǐ jiùkǔ tiānzūn.) also called the East Pole Emperor of Blue Essence (Note: Chinese: 東極青華大帝; pinyin: dōngjí qīnghuá dàdì.)

== See also ==
- Chinese mythology
