= Di (Chinese concept) =

Chinese term for the earth

The Chinese character for Dì.

Di (Chinese: 地; pinyin: dì; Wade–Giles: ti; lit. 'earth') is one of the oldest Chinese terms for the earth and a key concept or figure in Chinese philosophy and religion. It is widely considered to be one of three powers (sāncái, 三才) which are Heaven, Earth, and Humanity (tiān-dì-rén, 天地人).

There is a significant belief in Taoism which focuses on tian, as well as the forces of di (earth) and water, which are held to be equally powerful, instead of earth and humanity.

== Etymology ==
Dì is the modern Mandarin Chinese pronunciation. The Old Chinese pronunciation has been reconstructed as *lˤej-s.

The Chinese character 地 is a phono-semantic compound, combining the 土 radical ("earth", "dirt") with the (former) sound marker 也 (Modern Chinese yě, Old Chinese *lajʔ).

The relationship between tian and di is important to Taoist cosmology. They are among the "three realms" of the world (tian, earth, and water) presided over by the Three Great Emperor-Officials, and thought to maintain the two poles of the "three powers", with humanity occupying the pivotal position between them.

== Places ==
Mount Tai is seen as a sacred place in Confucianism and was traditionally the most revered place where Chinese emperors offered sacrifices to heaven and earth.

== See also ==
- Agriculture (Chinese mythology)
- Chinese gods and immortals
- Houji
- Sheji
- Unity of Heaven and humanity
