= Ziwei Emperor =

Chinese deity

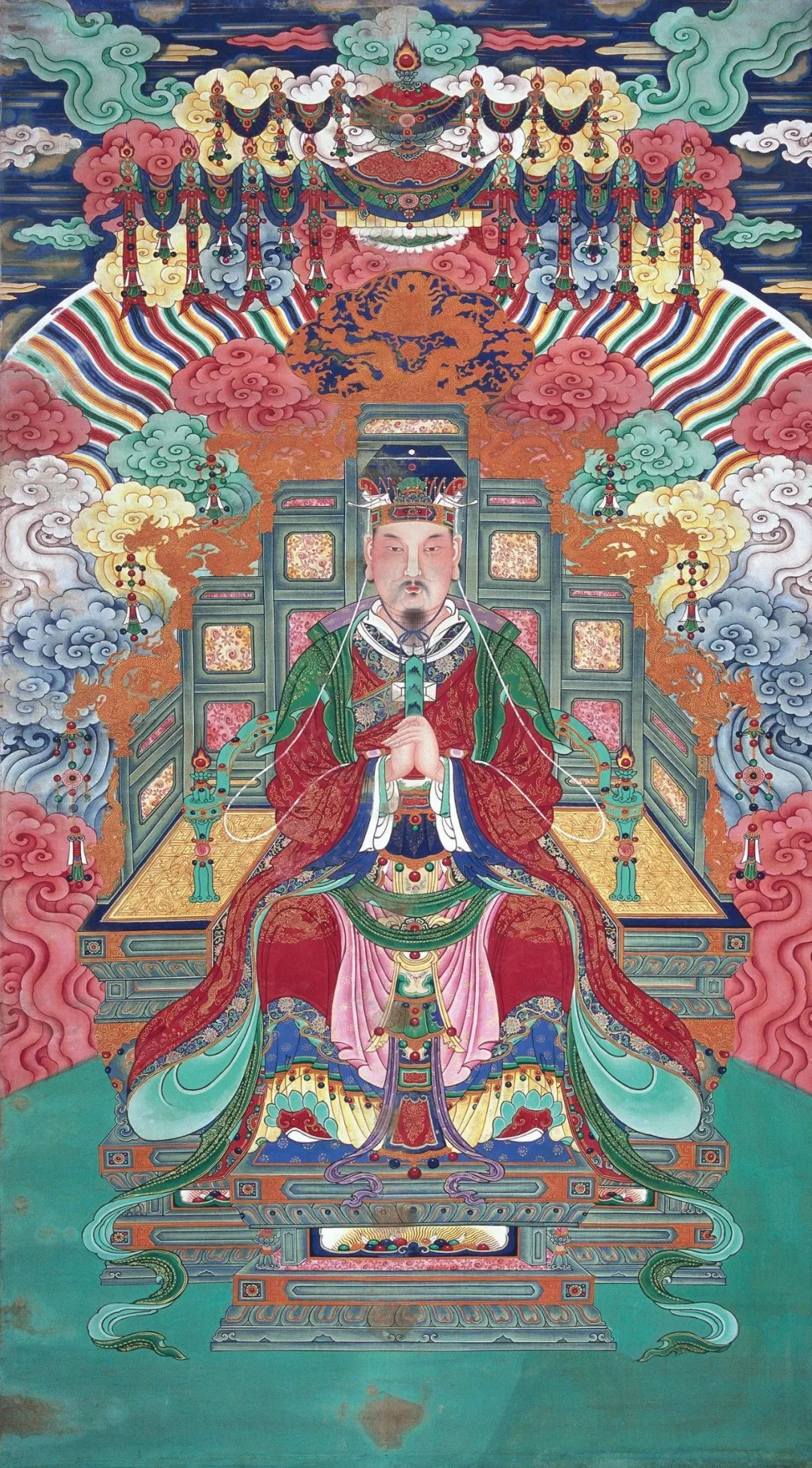
Ming dynasty portrait of Ziwei Emperor, housed at White Cloud Temple

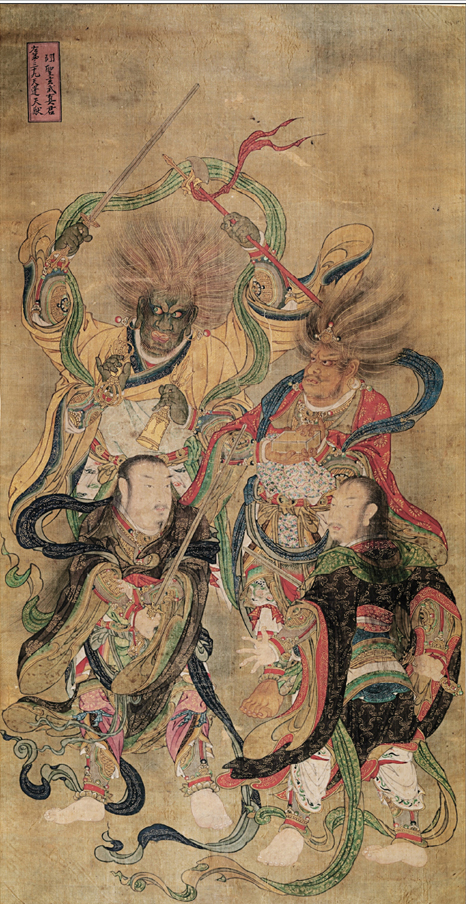
Shuilu ritual painting of the four guardians of the Ziwei Emperor, held at the Shanxi Museum, Ming Dynasty

The Great Emperor of the North Star, (Note: Full title: Great Emperor of the North Star in the Purple Forbidden enclosure at the center of Heaven (Chinese: 中天紫微北極太皇大帝; pinyin: Zhōngtiān Zǐwēi Běijí Tàihuáng Dàdì).) also called the Ziwei Emperor (Note: Chinese: 紫微大帝; pinyin: Zǐwēi Dàdì; lit. 'Great Emperor of the Purple Forbidden enclosure'.) (紫微) and the Beiji Emperor, (Note: Chinese: 北極大帝; pinyin: Běijí Dàdì; lit. 'Great Emperor of the North Pole'; full title: Lord of the North Pole at the center of Heaven (Chinese: 北極中天星主; pinyin: Běijí Zhōngtiān Xingzhu).) is one of the highest sky deities and one of the Four Sovereigns (四御; sì yù) and Three Great Emperor-Officials of Taoism.

== Chinese mythology ==
The Ziwei Emperor resides in the middle of Heaven and assists the Jade Emperor in administrative duties of Heaven and Earth; Sun and Moon; four seasons and weather. He commands all deities of constellations, mountains, and rivers. He is the highest deity in charge of all the natural phenomena in the universe. In Chinese culture and Chinese theology, the Ziwei Emperor is also the symbol of the emperor in the human world.
