= 帝 =

帝 may refer to:

- Emperor of China (皇帝)
- Emperor of Japan
  - Empire of Japan (大日本帝國)
- Wufang Shangdi
  - White Emperor
  - Black Emperor
  - Bluegreen Emperor
    - Dongyue Emperor
  - Red Emperor
  - Yellow Emperor
- Three Sovereigns and Five Emperors
  - Heavenly Sovereign
  - Earthly Sovereign
  - Human Sovereign
  - Fuxi
  - Nüwa
  - Gonggong
  - Shennong
  - Yan Emperor
  - Yellow Emperor
  - Shaohao
  - Zhuanxu
  - Emperor Ku
  - Emperor Zhi
  - Emperor Yao
  - Emperor Shun
  - Yu the Great
- Huaguang Dadi
- Four heavenly ministers
  - Jade Emperor
  - Ziwei Emperor, the Great Emperor of the North Star (Polaris) in the Purple Forbidden enclosure at the center of Heaven (Tian)
  - Gouchen Emperor, the Great Heavenly Emperor of the Highest Palace of the Curved Array (Little Dipper)
  - Houtu, the Empress of the Earth

== See also ==
- List of jōyō kanji
- Emperor
- Tsar
- Caliph
- Di (disambiguation)
- Tei (disambiguation)
