= Donghuang Taiyi =

Supreme Deity in Chinese religion and mythology

Taiyi

Chinese name
- Chinese: 太一
- Literal meaning: Supreme Unity; Supreme First
Transcriptions
Standard Mandarin
- Hanyu Pinyin: Tàiyī
- Wade–Giles: T'ai-i

Donghuang Taiyi
- Simplified Chinese: 东皇太一
- Literal meaning: Eastern Emperor and Supreme Unity
Transcriptions
Standard Mandarin
- Hanyu Pinyin: Dōnghuáng Tàiyī
- Wade–Giles: Tung-huang T'ai-i

Taiyi
- Chinese: 泰一
- Literal meaning: Magnificent Unity; Magnificent First
Transcriptions
Standard Mandarin
- Hanyu Pinyin: Tàiyī
- Wade–Giles: T'ai-i

Taiyi
- Chinese: 太乙
- Literal meaning: Supreme Unity; Supreme Second
Transcriptions
Standard Mandarin
- Hanyu Pinyin: Tàiyī
- Wade–Giles: T'ai-i

Taiyi, also known as Donghuang Taiyi, is an ancient Chinese deity or concept associated with the North Star in Chinese astronomy. He was the highest deity of certain pre-Qin and Han dynasties and was worshiped as the emperor of the heavens. In philosophy, Taiyi is a symbolism of the Tao, or the origin of the universe. During the period of Emperor Wu of Han, worship of Taiyi was an official belief, ranked above the Wufang Shangdi and worshipped by the emperor himself.

== Taiyi ==
Taiyi is regarded as the god of the North Star, the most honored star god in Chinese folk religion. The North Star is now Polaris but would have likely often referred to Kochab 2000 years ago and always Thuban at the beginning of Chinese civilization. The pole star is called Donghuang Taiyi in the poetry of the Chuci. In Sima Qian's Records of the Grand Historian it is stated that "Zhongguang, the star of the heavenly pole, whose one is bright, is also the permanent residence of Taiyi". The late Han dynasty writer Zheng Xuan wrote "Taiyi: the name of the god in the North Star (Beichen). He lives there and is called Taiyi." Zhang Shoujie wrote in the Tang dynasty: "Taiyi, another name of the Tiandi".

Taiyi manipulates good and bad fortune in the human world. The Weishu writes: "Taiyi is the master of wind and rain, water and drought, war and revolution, famine and plague". By worshipping Taiyi, one can invoke the gods and goddesses. During worship, the faithful entertained the gods with songs and dances.

Taoism in the Han dynasty also worshipped Taiyi, and at the end of the Han dynasty, the Taoist fraction known as the Taiping Dao honored Taiyi. Cultivators of the Tao medicate about Taiyi. One of its foundational texts, the Taipingjing, writes "Entering the room to contemplate the Tao...... is the way to ascend to Taiyi from Heaven." Taiyi was also transformed into one of the Shenshen deities of Taoism.

== Donghuang Taiyi ==
Donghuang Taiyi (Chinese: 东皇太一; pinyin: Dōnghuáng Tàiyī; lit. 'East Star Taiyi') is the name of the opening hymn of Chuci’s Jiuge, a collection of ceremonial hymns for the Chu dynasty emperor. It describes the worship of Donghuang Taiyi. Although it is never specified whether Donghuang is a title or a name, many modern depictions use it as his surname.

== Taiyi Creates Water ==
Taiyi Shengshui (Chinese: 太一生水; pinyin: Tàiyī Shēngshuǐ; lit. 'Taiyi Gave Birth to Water') is an ancient Chinese text written around 300 BC during the Warring States period. It is part of the Guodian Chu Slips.

It is a Taoist creation myth. According to the transcription and translation by professors Wen Xing and Robert G. Henricks of Dartmouth College, the opening lines are

太一生水， 水反輔太一， 是以成天。天反輔太一，是以成地。 天地（復相輔）也， 是以成神明。 神明復相輔也， 是以成陰陽。

The Great One (Taiyi) gave birth to water. Water returned and assisted Taiyi, in this way developing heaven. Heaven returned and assisted Taiyi, in this way developing the earth. Heaven and earth [repeatedly assisted each other], in this way developing the "gods above and below." The "gods above and below" repeatedly assisted each other, in this way developing Yin and Yang.

The Taiyi Shengshui was written on 14 bamboo strips and was discovered among the Guodian Chu Slips in 1993 in Hubei, Jingmen, and has not been discovered anywhere else. The text's inclusion in the Laozi C section of the Guodian Chujian from the Warring States Period has led some scholars to suggest it may have been considered part of the Tao Te Ching.

== Historical status ==
In 133 BC, the fangshi Miuji (cn: 谬忌) proposed that Taiyi was positioned above the Five Emperors. The Emperor Wu of Han took his advice and began worshipping Taiyi as the foremost deity. This was opposed by many Confucians, who believed that Huangtian Shangdi (Chinese: 皇天上帝; pinyin: Huángtiān Shàngdì) was the foremost deity. In AD 5, the Emperor Ping of Han declared that Taiyi was Huangtian Shangdi and began to refer to him as Huangtian Shangdi Taiyi (Chinese: 皇天上帝泰一; pinyin: Huángtiān Shàngdì Tàiyī). Later, Han dynasty national-level ceremonies kept the status of the Shangdi but began to drop Taiyi, instead of only worshipping Huangtian Shangdi as the supreme deity. Taiyi fell in status and was often worshipped among other lesser deities. During the Tang and Song dynasties, Taiyi was once again worshipped in official ceremonies.

== Shangyuan Festival traditions ==
Regarding the origin of the custom of hanging lanterns at the Shangyuan Festival or Yuanxiao Festival, there have been various theories. One is the honoring of Donghuang Taiyi by the Emperor Wu of Han. Song dynasty text "Qu Wei Jiu Wen 曲洧旧闻" wrote "On the Shangyuan lights: The Tang Dynasty inherited the custom from the Han Emperor's honoring of Taiyi by lighting his temple from dusk to dawn." The name Shangyuan might have also come from the Taoist honoring of it is because in Taoist thought, the Lantern Festival lanterns are lit in order to worship the Shangyuan Tianguan, or Heavenly Officials.

== Depictions in art ==
In the state of Chu, Taiyi was depicted as half-beast with a double-feathered mianguan, a loong under each limb, and stepping on the moon on one foot and the moon on the other. Older Han dynasty carvings show him as partially or full beast, often with a serpent-like body next to Nvwa and Fuxi. Since the Han dynasty, Taiyi was mostly depicted as a fully clothed human. Other famous depictions of him include Jiuge Illustrations (circa 1356) by Zhang Wo and Lisao Illustrations by Xiao Yuncong.

== In popular culture ==
- In the animated series The Legend of Qin, Donghuang Taiyi is the leader of the Yin-Yang school.
- In the mobile game Honor of Kings, Donghuang Taiyi is a playable character
- In the mobile game Dislyte, playable character Chu Yao gains the powers of Donghuang Taiyi.
- In the mobile game Honkai: Star Rail, the godlike aeon Eon is called Taiyi in Chinese.
