= Emperor of Heaven =

Emperor of Heaven may refer to:

- Emperor of Japan (Japanese: 天皇, lit. "Heaven emperor")
- Jade Emperor
- Tianhuang Emperor
  - Tianhuang Emperor (constellation)
- Shangdi
- Heavenly Sovereign
- Haneunim

== See also ==
- Kingship and kingdom of God
- Lethrinus mahsena or sky emperor, a species of emperor fish
- Śakra (Buddhism), usually identified with the Taoist Jade Emperor in East Asian Buddhism
- Sky deity
- Chinese theology
