= Macranthropy =

Portrayal of the universe as a giant anthropomorphic body

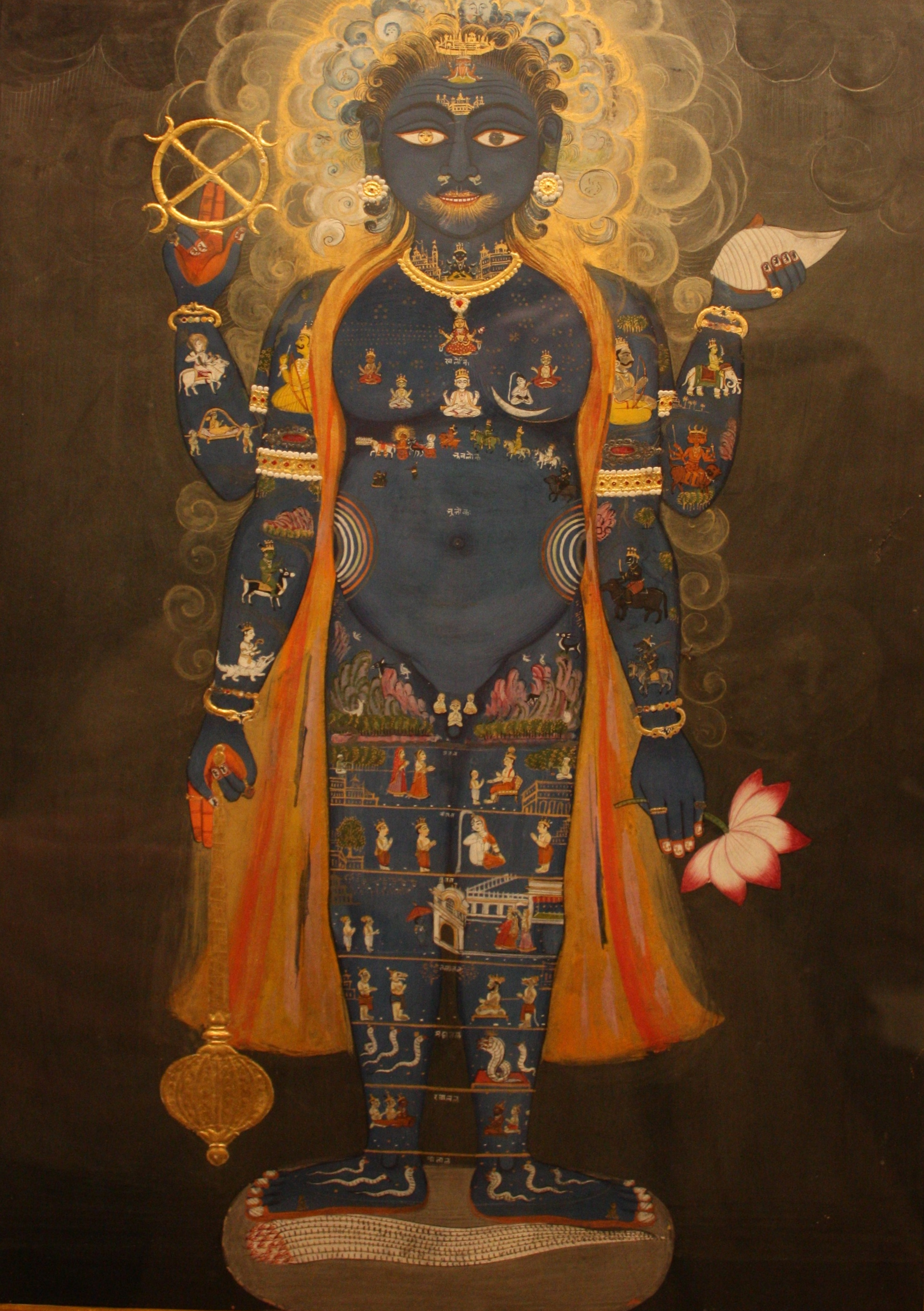
The Hindu Supreme God Vishnu depicted as the Cosmic Man (Vishvarupa), with the whole Hindu universe in it

Macranthropy is an allegorical concept where the universe is portrayed as a giant human body, with various cosmic elements represented as body parts. This concept has historical roots in several ancient civilizations.

== Historical instances ==
=== Ancient Mesopotamia ===
In Mesopotamian culture, macranthropy is exemplified in a hymn to Ninurta, where the god is depicted as a cosmic man. This hymn, believed to have originated from Kassite Nippur, portrays Ninurta in grand proportions, with major gods of the Mesopotamian pantheon represented as parts of his body, his clothing, and his weaponry. This imagery suggests that the hymn not only served as a religious text but also as a creative expression of the era's cosmological views. It is also thought that the Ninurta depicted in the hymn was a representation of a cult statue of the god. The discovery of a new manuscript from the Sippar Library has enabled a near-complete restoration of this text, shedding more light on Mesopotamian interpretations of macranthropy.

=== Ancient India ===
In Ancient India, the concept of macranthropy is embodied in the mahant-ātman or "vast self" of the Early and Middle Upaniṣads, a non-individualized spirit that originates and permeates the universe. This vast ātman enters all beings as their life force, a notion preceding the mahān (ātmā) of Sāṃkhya philosophy. Rooted in Middle Vedic texts, the mahant-puruṣa, or "vast person," represents an older concept, contrasting with the minuscule puruṣa within humans, often symbolized as a tiny figure in the pupil or a thumb-sized being in the heart. This anthropomorphic puruṣa, differing from the ātman, is seen as a "person within the person." Sometimes identified with the Puruṣa of Ṛgveda 10.90, from whose body the universe is formed, the vast puruṣa's imagery largely stems from this hymn. The Brāhmaṇa texts often explore the identity between the human soul-person and the solar puruṣa, reflecting deep micro-macrocosmic speculations.

=== Ancient China ===
Pangu, a central figure in Chinese mythology, is a primordial being who played a key role in the creation of the world. This myth, first recorded by Xu Zheng during the Three Kingdoms period, narrates how Pangu emerged from a cosmic egg, balancing the principles of yin and yang, and separated heaven and earth. Over 18,000 years, Pangu grew, lifting the sky and thickening the earth each day. Upon his death, his body transformed into various elements of the natural world, such as mountains, rivers, wind, and the Sun and Moon.

=== Norse mythology ===
Ymir, a primeval giant and the progenitor of all jötnar (giants), is central to the Norse creation myth. After his demise at the hands of Odin and his brothers, Ymir's body is used to create the world. The body of Ymir is seen as constituting primal matter. His flesh forms the earth, his blood becomes the seas, his bones turn into mountains, his hair transforms into trees, and his skull constitutes the sky. His eyebrows are even said to create Midgard, the realm of humans. This vivid portrayal of the world emerging from the body of a giant captures the essence of macranthropy, linking human form with cosmic creation in a deeply symbolic manner.

== See also ==
- Cipactli
- Macrocosm and microcosm
- Pangu
- Pantheism
- Purusha
- Ymir
