= Tianhuang Emperor (disambiguation) =

Tianhuang Emperor is one of the Daoism's "Four heavenly ministers".

Tianhuang Emperor may also refer to:

- Tianhuang Emperor (constellation), an ancient Chinese constellation and symbol of the emperor
- Tianhuang Emperor (star), a star in the constellation Cepheus
- Emperor Gaozong of Tang, an emperor of the Tang dynasty
- Liu Yan (emperor), founder of the Southern Han dynasty of the Five Dynasties and Ten Kingdoms period
- Shangdi, the Chinese term for "Supreme Deity" in religious Confucianism
