= Taiyi =

Taiyi, Tai-yi, or Tai yi may refer to:

== Religion and philosophy ==
- Donghuang Taiyi, a Chinese name and concept of God
- Taiyi Shengshui (太一生水), Taoist creation myth written about 300 BC
- Taiyi Taoism, school of Taoism during the Jin dynasty
- Taiyi Zhenren, Daoist deity and folklore character
- Tàiyī Yuánjūn or Doumu, goddess in Chinese religion and Taoism
- Taiyi jinhua zongzhi, Chinese for The Secret of the Golden Flower, Taoist classic on neidan meditation

== People and places ==
- Tai Yi, ancient Chinese name for Mount Taibai in Shaanxi Province
- Tai-yi, courtesy name for Tang of Shang, first king of the Shang dynasty
- Tai-yi Lin (1926–2003), Chinese-American writer and translator
- Taiyi Mountains or Zhongnan Mountains, branch of the Qin Mountains in Shaanxi Province
- Tai Yi Shan, one historic name for Lantau Island, in Hong Kong
- Tái yī xiàn, Chinese for Provincial Highway 1 (Taiwan), a major north-south highway

== Other ==
- Taiyi, the International Astronomical Union approved name for the star 8 Draconis
- Taiyi, name for ST-23, an acupuncture point
- Tai Yi Shen Shu, a Chinese metaphysical predictive art
