= Pangu =

Chinese mythical figure

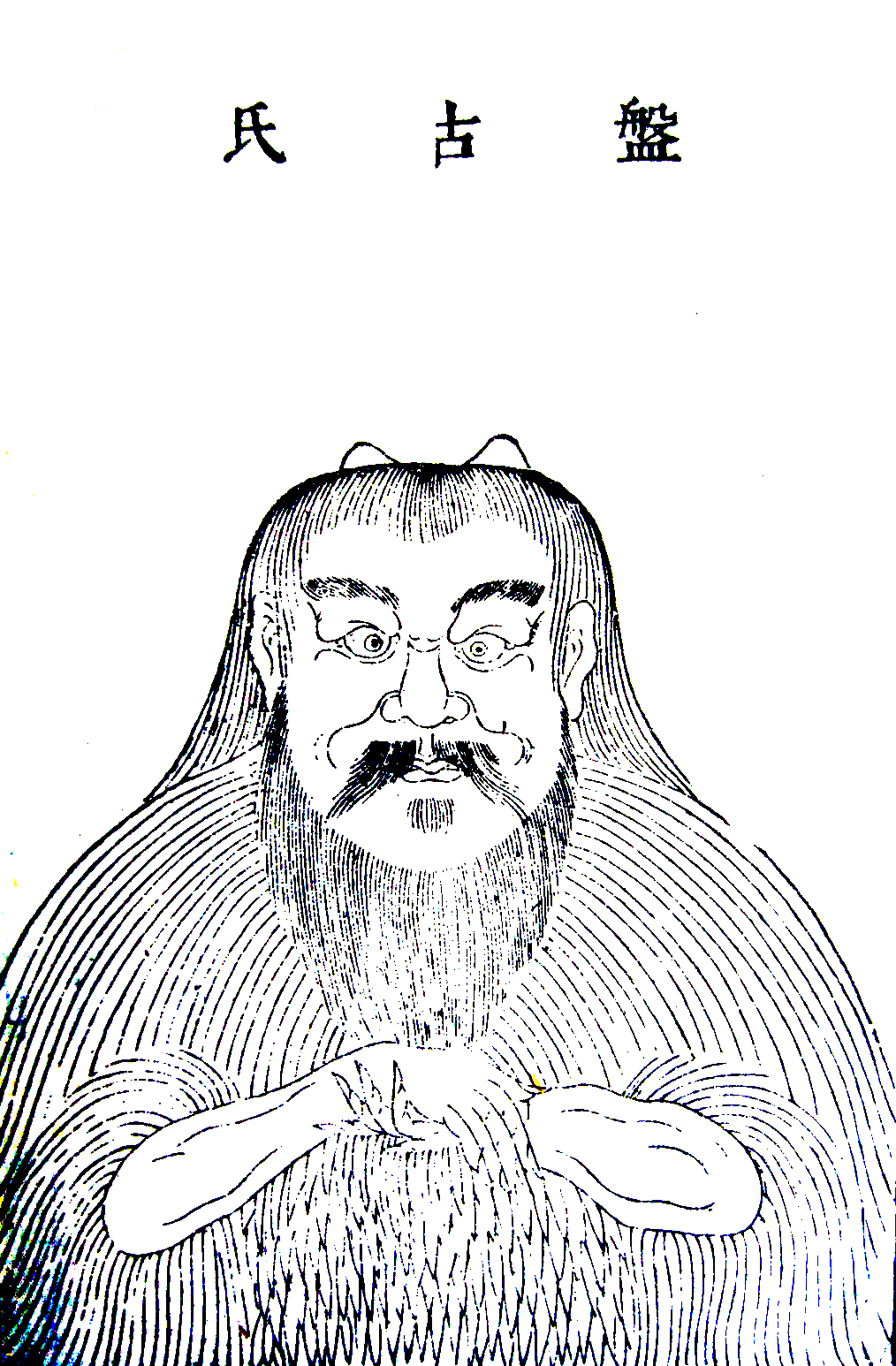
- Portrait of Pangu from Sancai Tuhui
- Traditional Chinese: 盤古
- Simplified Chinese: 盘古
- Literal meaning: Ancient dome
Transcriptions
Standard Mandarin
- Hanyu Pinyin: Pángǔ
- Bopomofo: ㄆㄤㄍㄨ
- Wade–Giles: P'an^{2}-ku^{3}
- IPA: [pʰǎn.kù]
Yue: Cantonese
- Jyutping: pun^{4} gu^{2}
Southern Min
- Hokkien POJ: Phoân-kó͘
Middle Chinese
- Middle Chinese: /buɑn kuo^{X}/

Pangu or Pan Gu (also sometimes spelled Peng Gu and P’an-ku) (Chinese: 盤古; pinyin: Pángǔ ; PAN-koo) is a primordial being and creation figure in Chinese mythology and in Taoism. According to legend, Pangu separated heaven and earth, and his body later became geographic features such as mountains and flowing water.

== Legend ==
The earliest known writer to record the myth of Pangu is believed to have been Xu Zheng during the Three Kingdoms period. However, his name was found in a tomb predating the Three Kingdoms period.

In the beginning, there was nothing and the universe was in a featureless, formless primordial state. This primordial state coalesced into a cosmic egg over the course of about 18,000 years. Within it, the perfectly opposed principles of yin and yang became balanced and Pangu emerged (or woke up) from the egg. Pangu inside the cosmic egg symbolizes Taiji. Pangu is usually depicted as a primitive, hairy giant with horns on his head. Pangu then began creating the world: he separated yin from yang with a swing of his giant axe, creating the earth (murky yin) and the sky (clear yang). To keep them separated, Pangu stood between them and pushed up the sky. With each day, the sky grew ten feet (3.0 meters) higher, the earth ten feet lower, and Pangu ten feet taller.

In some versions of the story, Pangu is aided in this task by the Four Auspicious Beasts (四靈獸). There are many different legends about Pangu's creation of the world, with some saying that this task took 18,000 years, while others say that he lived for millions of years.

One version of the legend says that at the centre of Pangu's celestial realm stood a mountain he called Seven Treasures Peak, which is where he built a home called Jade Terrace of the Mysterious City. Far away resided the Jade Maiden, who he saw wandering through the great limitless one day. He invited her to come live with him at Seven Treasures Peak. Their union gave birth to the Emperor of the East and Empress of the West as well as the Celestial Lord, who then created the Terrestrial Lord, who in turn gave birth to the Lord of Humanity. Other versions of the legend state that he had no direct offspring and that instead his body transformed after his death into all forms of life in the universe.

When Pangu died, his breath became the wind, mist and clouds; his voice, thunder; his left eye, the Sun; his right eye, the Moon; his head, the mountains and extremes of the world; his blood, rivers; his muscles, fertile land; his facial hair, the stars and Milky Way; his fur, bushes and forests; his bones, valuable minerals; his bone marrow, precious jewels; his sweat, rain; and the fleas on his fur carried by the wind became animals.

In other versions of the story, his body turned into the mountains.

== Origin ==
Three main elements describe the origin of the Pangu myth. The first is that the story is indigenous and was developed or transmitted through time to Xu Zheng. Senior Scholar Wei Juxian states that the Pangu story is derived from stories during the Western Zhou dynasty. He cites the story of Zhong (重) and Li (黎) in the "Chuyu (楚語)" section of the ancient classics Guoyu. In it, King Zhao of Chu asked Guanshefu (觀射父) a question: "What did the ancient classic "Zhou Shu (周書)" mean by the sentence that Zhong and Li caused the heaven and earth to disconnect from each other?" The "Zhou Shu" sentence he refers to is about an earlier person, Lü Xing (呂刑), who converses with King Mu of Zhou. King Mu's reign is much earlier and dates to about 1001 to 946 BC. In their conversation, they discuss a "disconnection" between heaven and earth.

Derk Bodde linked the myth to the ancestral mythologies of the Miao people and Yao people in southern China.

This is how Professor Qin Naichang (覃乃昌), head of the Guangxi Institute for Nationality Studies, reconstructs the true creation myth preceding the myth of Pangu. The story is a variant of the great flood and procreation theme. Note that it is not actually a creation myth:

A brother and his sister became the only survivors of the prehistoric Deluge by crouching in a gourd that floated on water. The two got married afterwards, and a mass of flesh in the shape of a whetstone was born. They chopped it and the pieces turned into large crowds of people, who began to reproduce again. The couple were named 'Pan' and 'Gou' in the Zhuang ethnic language, which stand for whetstone and gourd respectively.

19th-century comparative religion scholar Paul Carus writes:

P'an-Gu: The basic idea of the yih philosophy was so convincing that it almost obliterated the Taoist cosmology of P'an-Ku who is said to have chiseled the world out of the rocks of eternity. Though the legend is not held in high honor by the literati, it contains some features of interest which have not as yet been pointed out and deserve at least an incidental comment.

P'an-Gu is written in two ways: one means in literal translations, "basin ancient", the other "basin solid". Both are homophones, i.e., they are pronounced the same way; and the former may be preferred as the original and correct spelling. Obviously the name means "aboriginal abyss," or in the terser German, Urgrund, and we have reason to believe it to be a translation of the Babylonian Tiamat, "the Deep."

The Chinese legend tells us that P'an-Ku's bones changed to rocks; his flesh to earth; his marrow, teeth and nails to metals; his hair to herbs and trees; his veins to rivers; his breath to wind; and his four limbs became pillars marking the four corners of the world, which is a Chinese version not only of the Norse myth of the Giant Ymir, but also of the Babylonian myth of Tiamat.

Illustrations of P'an-Ku represent him in the company of supernatural animals that symbolize old age or immortality, viz., the tortoise and the crane; sometimes also the dragon, the emblem of power, and the phoenix, the emblem of bliss.

When the earth had thus been shaped from the body of P'an-Ku, we are told that three great rivers successively governed the world: first the celestial, then the terrestrial, and finally the human sovereign. They were followed by Yung-Ch'eng and Sui -Jen (i.e., fire-man) the latter being the Chinese Prometheus, who brought the fire down from heaven and taught man its various uses.

The Prometheus myth is not indigenous to Greece, where it received the artistically classical form under which it is best known to us. The name, which by an ingenious afterthought is explained as "the fore thinker," is originally the Sanskrit pramantha and means "twirler" or "fire-stick," being the rod of hard wood which produced fire by rapid rotation in a piece of soft wood.

We cannot deny that the myth must have been known also in Mesopotamia, the main center of civilization between India and Greece, and it becomes probable that the figure Sui-Jen has been derived from the same prototype as the Greek Prometheus.

The missionary and translator James Legge discusses Pangu:

P'an-ku is spoken of by the common people as "the first man, who opened up heaven and earth." It has been said to me in "pidgin" English that "he is all the same your Adam"; and in Taoist picture books I have seen him as a shaggy, dwarfish, Hercules, developing from a bear rather than an ape, and wielding an immense hammer and chisel with which he is breaking the chaotic rocks.

== Other Chinese creation myths ==
The Pangu myth appears to have been preceded in ancient Chinese literature by the existence of Shangdi or Taiyi (of the Taiyi Shengshui). Other Chinese myths, such as those of Nüwa and the Jade Emperor, try to explain how people were created and do not necessarily explain the creation of the world. There are many variations of these myths.

== In Bouyei culture ==
According to Bouyei mythology, after Pangu became an expert in rice farming after creating the world, he married the daughter of the Dragon King, and their union gave rise to the Buyei people. This is celebrated by the Bouyei people on June 6, as a holiday.

The daughter of the Dragon King and Pangu had a son named Xinheng (新横). When Xinheng disrespected his mother, she returned to heaven and never came down, despite the repeated pleas of her husband and son. Pangu was forced to remarry and eventually died on the sixth day of the sixth month of the lunar calendar.

Xinheng's stepmother treated him badly and almost killed him. When Xinheng threatened to destroy her rice harvest, she realized her mistake. She made peace with him and they went on to pay their respects to Pangu annually on the sixth day of the sixth month of the lunar calendar. This day became an important traditional Buyei holiday for ancestral worship.

This legend of creation is one of the main characteristics that distinguishes the Buyei from the Zhuang.

== Worship ==
Pangu is worshipped at a number of shrines in contemporary China, usually with Taoist symbols, such as the Bagua.

The Pangu King Temple (盘古皇庙; 盤古皇廟) built in 1809 is located in Guangdong Province, northwest Huadu District (west of G106 / north of S118), north of Shiling Town at the foot of the Pangu King Mountain. The Huadu District is located north of Guangzhou to the west of the Baiyun International Airport.

The term for the primordial supercontinent Pangaea is translated as "盤古大陸" (Pangu continent) in Chinese, referring to the creation myth.

== See also ==
- Cosmic Man
- Tiamat (Ancient Mesopotamian)
- Nu (mythology) (Ancient Egyptian)
- Chaos (cosmogony) (Ancient Greek)
- Ymir (Norse)
- Gaia
- Kingu
- Korean creation narratives
- Manu (Hinduism)
- Panguite, meteoritic mineral named after Pangu, discovered in 2012
- Protoplast (religion)
- Purusha
- Thần Trụ Trời
- Tlaltecuhtli
- Yama

== Bibliography ==
- Xu Zheng (徐整; Xú Zhěng; 220–265 AD), in the book Three Five Historic Records (三五歷紀; Sānwǔ Lìjì), is the first to mention Pangu in the story "Pangu Separates the Sky from the Earth".
- Ge Hong (葛洪; Gě Hóng; 284–364 AD), in the book Master of Preserving Simplicity Inner Writings (抱朴子内篇; Baopuzi Neipian), describes Pangu (Werner, E.T.C. Myths and Legends of China (1922)).
- Ouyang Xun (歐陽詢; Ōuyáng Xún; 557–641 AD), in the book Classified Anthology of Literary Works (藝文類聚; Yiwen Leiju), also refers to Pangu.
- Carus, Paul (1852–1919) in the book Chinese Astrology, Early Chinese Occultism (1974) based on an earlier book by the same author Chinese Thought. This book was a bestseller (1907).

=== Additional sources ===
- Mentions of Pangu as Adam from The Papers of Charles Daniel Tenney

Pangu
Regnal titles
Preceded by Nothing	Succeeded by Tianhuang
