= Tenno (disambiguation) =

Tennō (天皇) is a Japanese word for the Emperor of Japan.

Tenno may also refer to:

- The Japanese Emperor butterfly Sasakia charonda.
- Tenno, Trentino, a municipality in Italy
- Tennō, Akita, a town in Japan
- Hayden Tenno, the antiheroic protagonist of the 2008 video game Dark Sector
- The name given to player-controlled characters as a whole in the video game Warframe

== See also ==
- Tianhuang, Chinese for the characters 天皇
