= Youchao clan =

Legendary Chinese clan, origin of buildings

Youchao 有巢氏
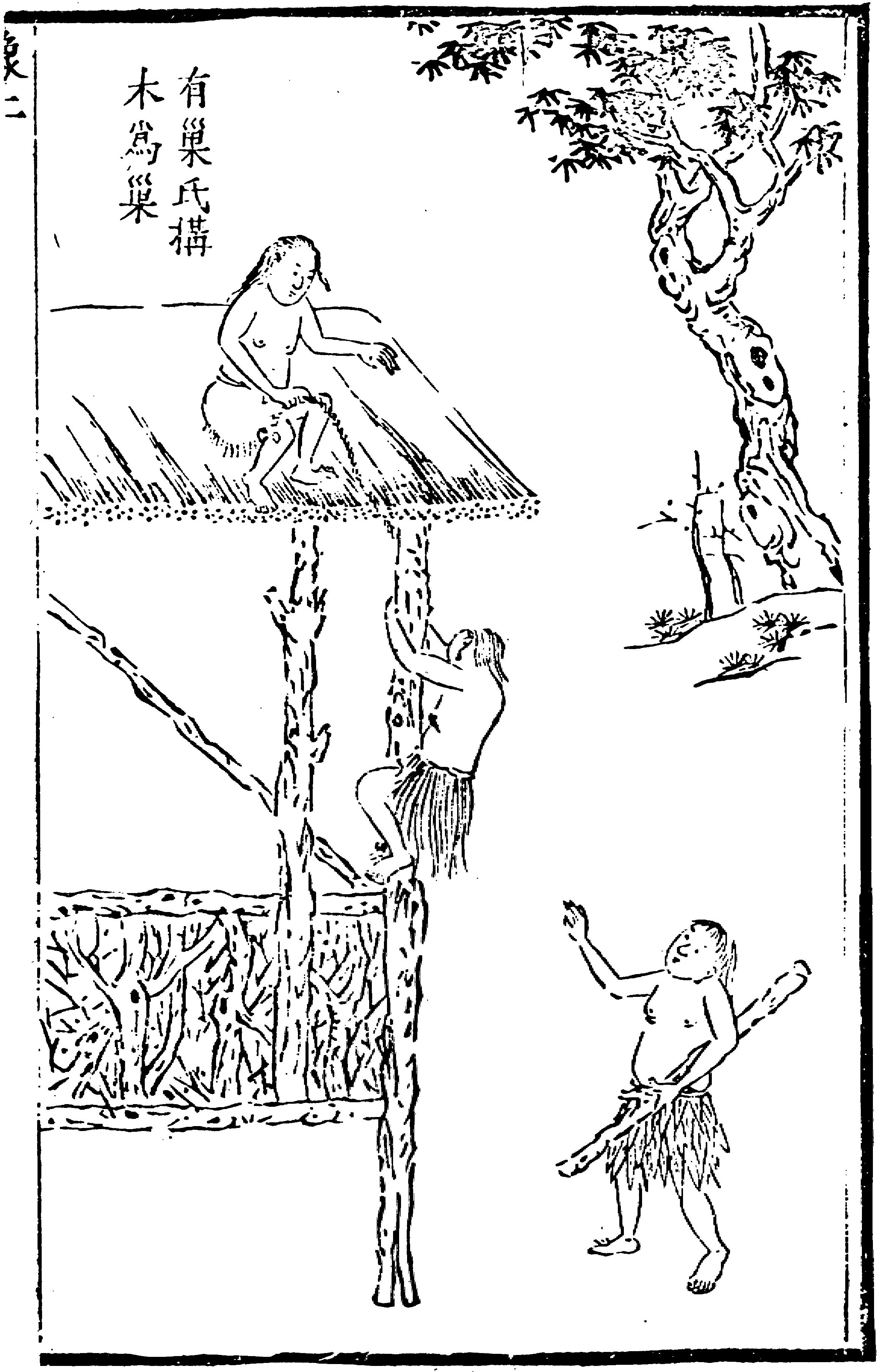
- Art of the Youchao clan
- Capital: Chaohu
- Common languages: Proto-Sinitic
- Government: Chiefdom
- Historical era: Three Sovereigns and Five Emperors
Succeeded by
Suiren
- Today part of: Chaohu, Anhui

The Youchao clan (Chinese: 有巢氏, lit. "Clan of Nesters") was a legendary clan said to have existed during the Three Sovereigns and Five Emperors period of Chinese history, and is said to have been the origin of housing infrastructure according to ancient Chinese mythology. Along with the Fu Xi, Suiren, and Shennong clans, the Youchao form the Four Clans that marked the development of this period.

== Name ==
The name "Youchao" uses the Old Chinese prefix you (有), which is used to denote a clan. However, as this prefix was forgotten, Han and Tang dynasty texts such as Han Feizi record the clan as though it were a single person. Song dynasty scholar Luo Mi disambiguates this in Lushi, clarifying the name being of a clan.

Youchao is also known as Da Chao (大巢), which appears to be a variant name. It is recorded in Taiping Yulan.

== In traditional historiography ==
The Western Zhou text Lost Book of Zhou records the Youchao clan facing hardship due to a corrupt ruler:

昔者有巢氏有亂臣而貴，任之以國，假之以權，擅國而主斷，君已而奪之，臣怒而生變，有巢以亡。
Once, the Youchao clan had a rebellious minister who was honoured, and [the ruler] entrusted the state to him and gave him power. He then monopolized the state and made decisions arbitrarily. The ruler later took [power] back from him, and the minister, in his anger, created a rebellion, and Youchao perished thereby.

According to Han Feizi, people could avoid harm from animals with the help of buildings made from wood, which was taught by the Youchao. Zhuang Zhou expands on this in his eponymous book, where he mentions that the Youchao would gather nuts in the day and rest in trees at night to escape from predators.

== Identification ==
Ning Yegao (宁业高), citing recent archaeological findings, posits that the Chao Lake basin was the ancestral home of the Youchao clan.

Youchao clan Three Sovereigns and Five Emperors
Regnal titles
Preceded by Renhuang	Sovereign of China c. 3162–2962 BCE	Succeeded by Suiren
