= Heavenly Sovereign =

Legendary Chinese sovereign

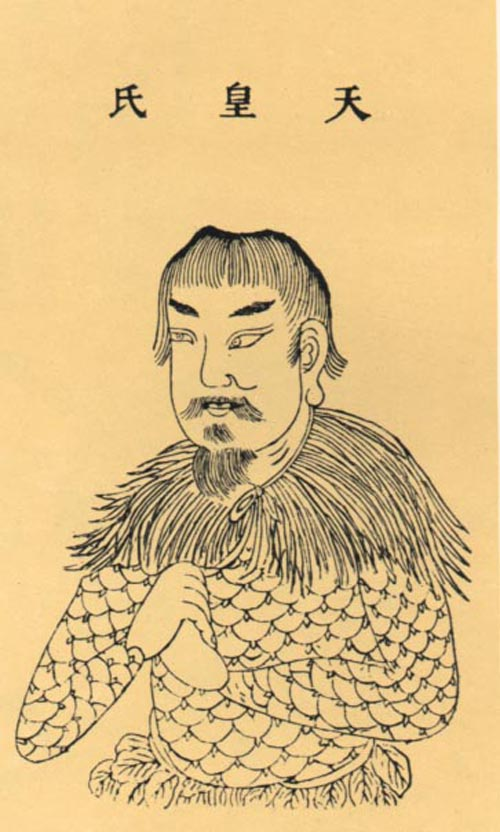
Portrait of Tianhuang in Sancai Tuhui

Tianhuang (Chinese: 天皇, Pinyin: Tiānhuáng, "Heavenly Sovereign") was the first legendary Chinese sovereign after Pangu's era. According to Yiwen Leiju, he was the first of the Three Sovereigns.

== Name ==
The book Lushi from the Song Dynasty records that his family name was Wang (望, meaning "to observe" or "day or night of the full moon"), his given name Huo (獲, meaning "to hunt or catch"), and his courtesy name Zirun (子潤, run means "wet" or "wealthy", so "prosperous descendants").

== Biography ==
According to the "Basic Annals of the Three Sovereigns" (三皇本紀) in Sima Zhen's supplement to the Records of the Grand Historian:

- After Heaven and Earth were formed, there was Tianhuang, who had twelve heads.
- This sovereign had an unselfish personality(as if in a calm state or living in retirement) that even if he did not try to help the people, people's customs changed for the better.
- Tianhuang was a ruler of many achievements, and was the sovereign ruling under the influence (de) of the wood element (木德王). He lived to 18,000 years old. His twelve children supported him in ruling over the world.
- His greatest achievement was suppressing all the chaos, dividing the world for the many tribes, and choosing the best people to rule the tribes.

His successor was Renhuang.

According to the Yiwen Leiju,

- Based on Shixue (始學) by Xiang Jun, after heaven and earth were formed, there was Tianhuang, with 13 heads. He was called Tianling (天靈, 'heavenly spirit') and ruled the world for 18,000 years.
- Based on Dongming Ji (洞冥記, lit. "Records of everything about the ghosts"), there were 13 people with the same family name.
- Based on the records in the Three Five Historic Records (三五歷紀) by Xu Zheng, when history began, life started to exist, and there was a divine spirit that had 13 heads called Tianhuang.
- Based on Chunqiu Wei (春秋緯), there were rulers named Tianhuang, Dihuang and Renhuang, the latter had 9 brothers and divided the world into the Nine Provinces, which spanned the world.
- Based on Dunjiakaishantu (遁甲開山圖), his remains are said to be under Kunlun in Zhuzhou (柱州).

== See also ==
- Chinese mythology
- Three Sovereigns and Five Emperors

Heavenly Sovereign Three Sovereigns and Five Emperors
Regnal titles
Preceded by Pangu	Sovereign of China; Unknown	Succeeded by Dihuang
