= Dihuang =

Legendary Chinese sovereign

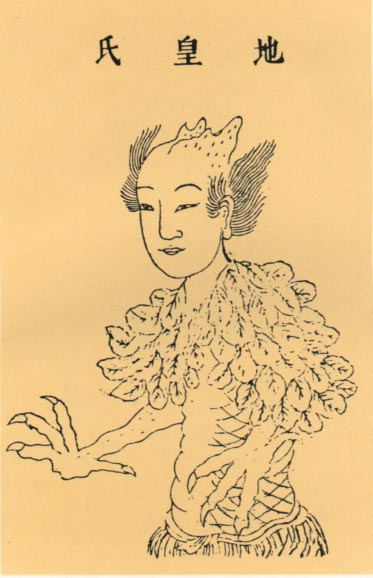
Portrait of Dihuang in Sancai Tuhui

Dihuang (Chinese: 地皇, Pinyin: Dìhuáng, "Earthly Sovereign") was the second legendary Chinese sovereign after Pangu's era. According to Yiwen Leiju, he was the second of the Three Sovereigns.

== Biography ==
According to the "Basic Annals of the Three Sovereigns" (三皇本紀) in Sima Zhen’s supplement to the Records of the Grand Historian:

- Dihuang had eleven heads, was the sovereign ruling under the influence (de) of the fire element (火德王).
- And, Dihuang was a ruler of many achievements, had eleven brothers, died aged eighteen thousand years old.

After he was born, the world was filled with chaos. That year, the sun and moon born from the two eyes of Pangu, and the stars born from Pangu’s hairs couldn't move smoothly and orderly, which caused many days without the sun, or many days with the sun shining throughout the whole day, or many dangerous falling star accidents. With his power, Dihuang corrected that which was in error. He made the sun and moon move correctly, and stipulated the days of a month and the months of a year.

Dihuang's rule lasted eleven thousand years.

He created Mount Xionger (熊耳山 Xióngĕrshān "bear ear mountain") and Mount Longmen (龍門山 Lóngménshān "dragon gate mountain"). His successor was Renhuang.

== See also ==
- Chinese mythology

Dihuang Three Sovereigns and Five Emperors
Regnal titles
Preceded by Tianhuang	Sovereign of China; Unknown	Succeeded by Renhuang
