= Xing Zi Ming Chu =

Xing Zi Ming Chu (Chinese: 性自命出; pinyin: xìng zì mìng chū), translated as Human Nature Is Brought Forth by Decree or The Inborn-Nature Comes from the Mandate, is a Warring States period (ca. 5th century – 221 BCE) text from the Kingdom of Chu, excavated in 1993 from the Guodian tomb, near Jingmen in Hubei, China. It is one of the earliest Chinese texts to discuss human nature, although it was lost until its re-discovery.

== Background ==
Xing Zi Ming Chu is part of the Guodian Chu Slips, a corpus of manuscripts written on bamboo slips from the Guodian tomb excavated in 1993, which can be dated to approximately 300 BCE, when the tomb was sealed. This manuscript is one of the longer ones from Guodian, containing about 1,550 characters, written on sixty-seven slips which are 32.5 centimetres (12.8 in) long. Nine of the slips have been damaged, leading to a loss of 29 characters.

The author of Xing Zi Ming Chu is contested. According to some scholars it was written by Zi Si (483–402 BCE), a grandson of Confucius, based on the similarities in thought between this text and others which he or his disciples are traditionally held to have written, such as Zi Yi (Chinese: 緇衣; pinyin: zī yī). However, while acknowledging the likelihood that Xing Zi Ming Chu and the other Guodian texts circulated during Zi Si's lifetime, other scholars do not find this evidence persuasive, leaving the question of authorship open.

This bamboo manuscript has a counterpart in the Shanghai Museum corpus, named by the editors Xing Qing Lun, Discussions on Natural Dispositions and Emotions (Chinese: 性情論; pinyin: xìng qíng lùn, also translated as Discourse on Human Nature and Unshaped Feelings). Their relationship is a matter of debate. The first halves of each are very similar, and they also feature similar punctuation. Despite that, their second halves diverge, and certain characters do not exactly match. These differences have been interpreted to mean that Xing Zi Ming Chu is either a version of Xing Qing Lun, or that they share a common textual lineage. While some scholars claim that they are unlikely to have been copied from one another, some features suggest that visual copying was also part of the production process.

== Summary ==
Xing Zi Ming Chu discusses human nature in the context of the Way and an ethics which would be later viewed as "Confucian," relating it to rightness, benevolence, the mind, and unshaped feelings. (Note: The term "Confucianism" is problematic because it generalizes intellectual developments centred on core canonical texts throughout Chinese history. The Warring States period preceded the formation of a canon during the Han dynasty and its attribution to Confucius. Moreover, Warring States texts are composite in nature, with thinkers from different "schools" using the same ethical terms. It is therefore inaccurate to consider Warring States texts "Confucian.") It first discusses the origin of human nature in Heaven and humanity. It continues by discussing what causes human nature to manifest, and how it does so. Next, it discusses the education of human nature through "odes," "documents," "rites," and "music," which themselves are said to be refined forms of natural human behaviour. Finally, the text becomes instructive, giving advice for particular situations.

== Analysis ==
Xing Zi Ming Chu strongly states that human nature derives from Heaven. This means that human nature is not a blank slate, and merely one of the many things that are born from Heaven's "decree." In its analysis, unshaped feelings derive from human nature; in turn the Way derives from unshaped feelings. The Way in Xing Zi Ming Chu transcends the phenomenological world, but is yet an innate part of human nature. Therefore humanity is predisposed to cultivation of human nature so as to transform its initial state. To begin with, human nature is characterized as responding to phenomena in the world emotionally. These responses become "proper" through ritual, i.e. the "odes," "documents," "rites," and "music," which had been categorized and organized by "sages." However, there is no evidence in Xing Zi Ming Chu that these references to tradition refer to specific texts, which is often assumed in the context of early Chinese thought. Rather, the text refers to them as traditions to be performed. (Note: In Xing Zi Ming Chu these four kinds of tradition are written as "詩 (shī)、書 (shū)、禮 (lǐ)、樂 (yuè)," which literally translates as "odes," "documents," "rites," and "music." Due to the ambiguity of classical Chinese and the conventions of classical Chinese scholarship, references to these traditions are often understood as referring to one of the Chinese classics: "odes" as The Classic of Odes, "documents" as The Book of Documents, "rites" as The Book of Rites and "music" the lost Classic of Music (whose existence as a written text is controversial). However, recent scholarship disputes the existence of written canons during the Warring States period, pointing to evidence in texts and manuscripts of oral transmission. This means one should not automatically infer from references in texts such as Xing Zi Ming Chu to these traditions that a text is referring specifically to one of the Chinese classics.) Thus humanity is drawn into a web of relations between Heaven, human nature, and moral cultivation, which reflects contemporary philosophical concerns with "working within and transforming a discontinuous world."

Scholars note that the concept of human nature set out in Xing Zi Ming Chu bears similarities with other Warring States texts. As mentioned, it draws on a similar philosophical vocabulary to texts later classed as "Confucian," some of which also discuss human nature, such as Mencius and Xunzi). In particular, its discussion of the relationship between unshaped feelings, ritual, and music has been compared to a similar discussion in a chapter of the Book of Rites. However, Xing Zi Ming Chu and similar texts from the Guodian tomb had disappeared from transmission at some point between the late Warring States period and the Western Han period for unclear reasons. As such, the relationship of Xing Zi Ming Chu to other Warring States texts remains speculative.

== Notes ==
Footnotes
