= Renhuang =

Legendary Chinese sovereign

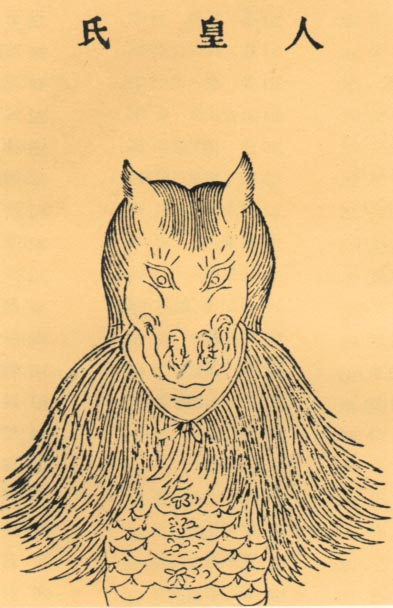
Portrait of Renhuang in Sancai Tuhui

Renhuang (Chinese: 人皇, Pinyin: Rénhuáng, "Human Sovereign"), was the third legendary Chinese sovereign after Pangu's era. According to Yiwen Leiju, he was the third and last of the Three Sovereigns.

== Biography ==
According to the "Basic Annals of the Three Sovereigns" (三皇本紀) in Sima Zhen’s supplement to the Records of the Grand Historian:

Rénhuáng had nine heads, rode a cloud-chariot (雲車, a cloud that a xian can ride like a chariot), drove its six feathers, and swallowed things from the inside to the outside. He had nine brothers. They led and divided the Nine Provinces, where each founded his own citadel. Their dynasty ruled through 150 generations, which was 45,600 years in total.

The legends says that he subdivided the land of China into nine provinces, which were united during a 45,600-year dynasty.

== See also ==
- Chinese mythology
- Three Sovereigns and Five Emperors

Renhuang Three Sovereigns and Five Emperors
Regnal titles
Preceded by Dihuang	Sovereign of China; Unknown	Succeeded by Youchao
