= HD 212710 =

B-type main-sequence star

- Location of HD 212710 (circled in red)

Observation data Epoch J2000.0 Equinox J2000.0
- Constellation: Cepheus
- Right ascension: 22^{h} 13^{m} 10.51283^{s}
- Declination: +86° 06′ 28.8116″
- Apparent magnitude (V): 5.258±0.009

Characteristics
- Evolutionary stage: main sequence
- Spectral type: B9.5 Vn
- U−B color index: −0.11
- B−V color index: −0.03

Astrometry
Radial velocity (R_{v})	−17.80±0.49 km/s
Proper motion (μ)	RA: +60.554 mas/yr Dec.: +39.468 mas/yr
Parallax (π)	12.8648±0.1662 mas
Distance	254 ± 3 ly (78 ± 1 pc)
Absolute magnitude (M_{V})	0.79

Details
Mass	2.61^{+0.438}_{−0.254} M_{☉}
Radius	2.387^{+0.086}_{−0.052} R_{☉}
Luminosity	53.79±1.38 L_{☉}
Surface gravity (log g)	4.0991±0.0652 cgs
Temperature	10162^{+164.7}_{−134} K

Other designations
- AG+85 372, BD+85 383, FK5 1648, HD 212710, HIP 109693, HR 8546, SAO 3721, 2MASS J22131056+8606287

Database references
SIMBAD	data

HD 212710 is a star in Cepheus with an apparent magnitude of 5.258 and a spectral type of B9.5 Vn, indicating that it is a B-type main sequence star, giving it a blue hue. It is about 254 light-years away from the Solar System. It has about 2.61 times the mass of the Sun, 2.387 times the radius of the Sun and is 53.79 times as luminous.

== Nomenclature ==
This star doesn't have a Bayer or Flamsteed designation. The designation HD 212710 comes from the Henry Draper Catalogue. It is also known as BD+85 383, SAO 3721, HR 8546, or HIP 109693 from various star catalogues.

Some sources identify this star with the Chinese star name Tiānhuángdàdì (Chinese: 天皇大帝, "Great Emperor of Heaven" or "Tianhuang Emperor"). It is an independent constellation in the system of Chinese constellations, belonging to the Purple Forbidden enclosure. (Note: Stellarium, citing Yi Shitong, 1981)
