= Suiren =

Legendary fire-making clan

Suiren 燧人氏
- c. 2700 BCE–?
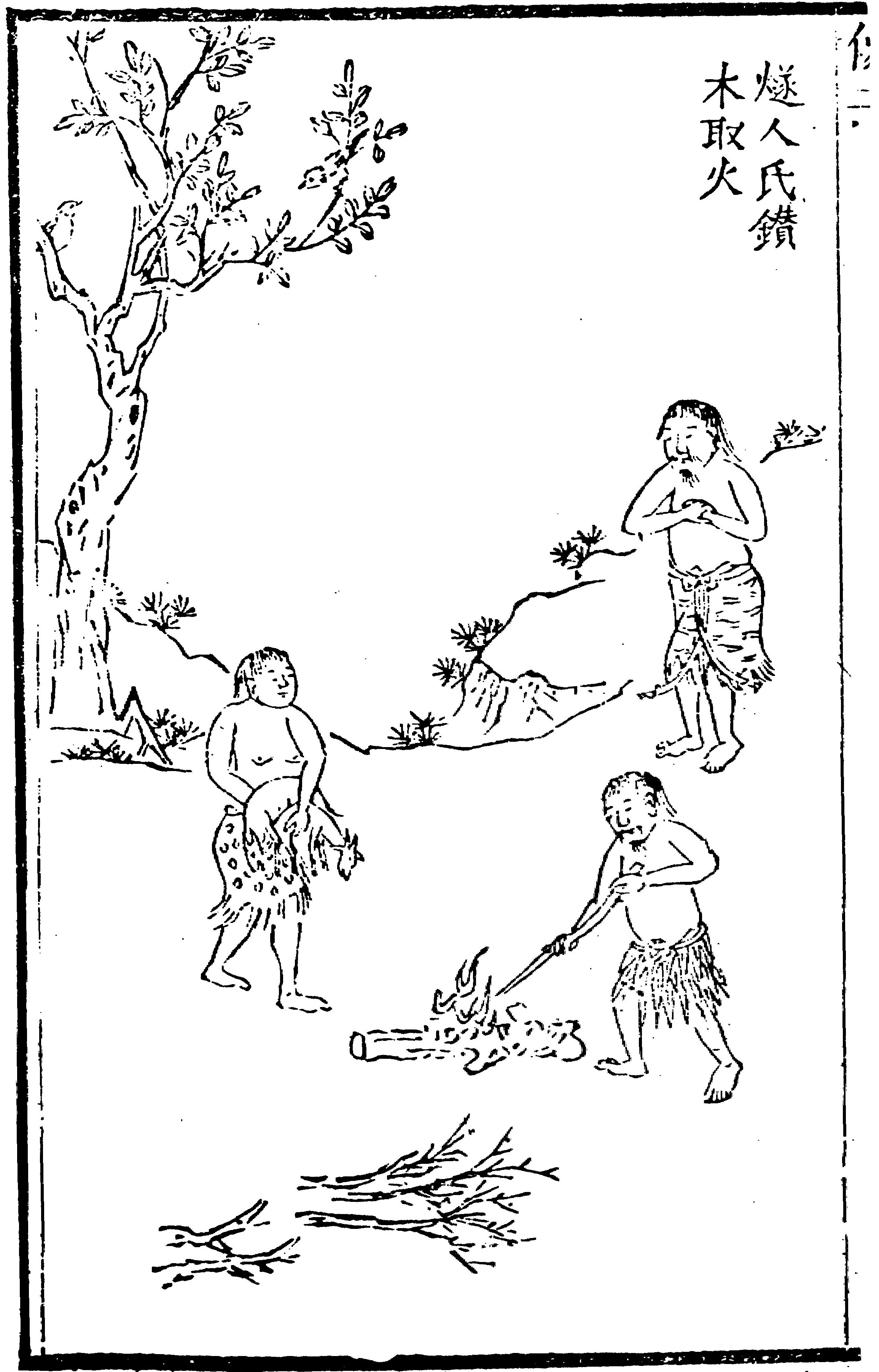
- The Suiren clan using fire.
- Common languages: Proto-Sinitic
- Government: Tribal confederation
- Ruler
  - ?: ?
- Historical era: Three Sovereigns and Five Emperors
  - Established: c. 2700 BCE
  - Control of fire: c. 2,700 BCE
  - Disestablished: ?
Preceded by	Succeeded by
Youchao clan	Fu Xi
- Today part of: Shangqiu, Henan

Suiren
- Traditional Chinese: 燧人
- Simplified Chinese: 燧人
Transcriptions
Standard Mandarin
- Hanyu Pinyin: suì rén

Sui Emperor or Suihuang
- Traditional Chinese: 燧皇
Transcriptions
Standard Mandarin
- Hanyu Pinyin: Suìhuáng

Suiren clan
- Traditional Chinese: 燧人氏
Transcriptions
Standard Mandarin
- Hanyu Pinyin: Suìrén Shì

The Suiren clan (Chinese: 燧人氏, Pinyin: Suìrén, "fire-making person"), also known as Suihuang (燧皇, Suìhuáng, "The Great Fire-maker") or simply Suiren, is a clan or figure in traditional Chinese historiography that is credited with introducing fire-making to humans.

== Name and identification ==
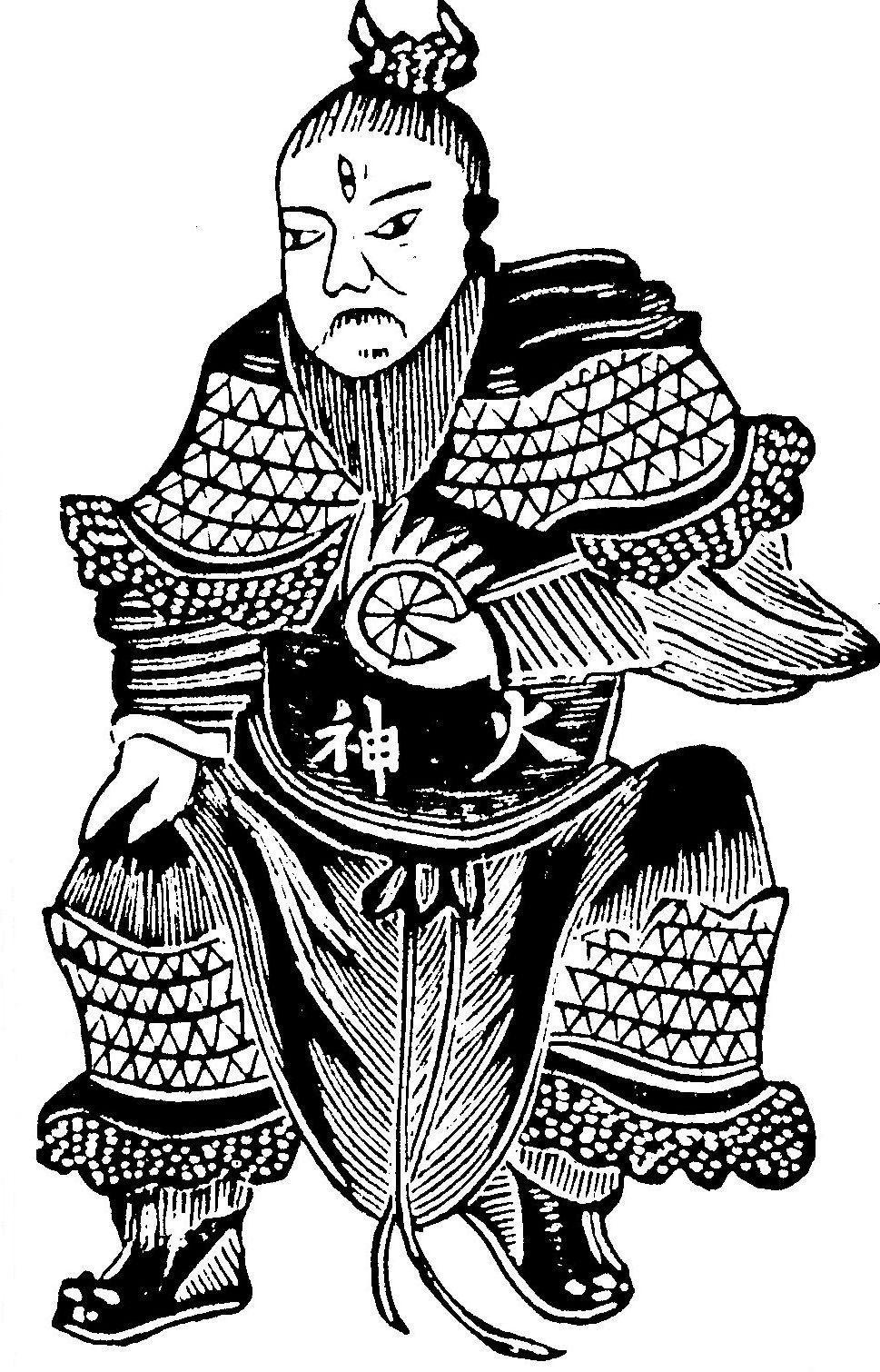
Depiction of Suiren as a person.

Suiren is mentioned alongside several other legendary clans that existed prior to dynastic China; in other words, before the semi-legendary Xia dynasty and the Late Shang. The name Suiren (燧人) literally means "fire-person," with "shi" (氏) meaning "clan." Structures like Suiren typically describe a kind of person, such as Churen (楚人) meaning "person of Chu," but some texts will refer to Suiren as if they are a single person.

Whether Suiren was a person or a clan was unclear to Han dynasty scholars and remains such today, with accounts varying considerably. Recent study points to a clan designation, which places the Suiren somewhere around the Huai River basin, as a hegemonic clan that held considerably sway over the region for a long period of time, and possibly changed its name at various points. Scholars such as Zhao Kuifu (赵逵夫) propose that the clan may have been led by a person called Suiren, and is thus where the name came from. Other connected polities, such as the Youchao clan, use the Old Chinese prefix 有 you, which was used to denote locations in Shang-Zhou texts, but was progressively forgotten come the Han dynasty that report many of the myths.

Suiren is sometimes cited as one of the Three Sovereigns in the makeup of the Three Sovereigns and Five Emperors. Folkloric views of Suiren categorise them or the clan, along with those rulers as a whole, as deities that became progressively humanised over time, akin to the Yellow Emperor.

== In traditional historiography ==
Gu San Fen claims that the Suiren clan came from the Youchao clan and was succeeded by Fu Xi's clan. Suiren is mentioned in ten books from the Han dynasty or before. Guanzi, mentions Duke Huan of Qi consulting Guan Zhong about economic management, to which he responds by claiming that "from the time of Suiren onwards, there has never been a case where the principle of "light and heavy" (輕重) was not used to govern." In the surrounding chapters, "light and heavy" refers to the relative scarcity and price of goods: The state participates in markets, buying when goods are abundant and cheap and releasing them when they are scarce and dear, in order to stabilize prices and capture revenue that would otherwise go to merchants.

The accounts of the Suiren's control of fire varies. The earliest sources from Eastern Zhou through the Han dynasty claim that the Suiren used wood-drilling (鑽木取火), whilst later texts sometimes claim the use of flint-striking (擊石取火). Zhong Lun describes the Suiren as observing seasons to inform the making of fire. Outside of these texts, Suiren is also cited in Zhuangzi and Xunzi in more general senses.

Shuowen Jiezi records the Suiren creating a rang (禳) character, which Paul W. Kroll describes as a deprecatory sacrifice used to ward off evil spirits.

Suiren Three Sovereigns and Five Emperors
Regnal titles
Preceded by Youchao	Sovereign of China c. 2961–2852 BCE	Succeeded by Fuxi
