= Taiyi Shengshui =

Taiyi Shengshui (Chinese: 太一生水; pinyin: Tàiyī Shēngshuǐ; lit. 'The Great One Gave Birth to Water') is an ancient Chinese text from around 300 BC during the Warring States period. It was discovered as part of the Guodian Chu Slips.

It is a Taoist creation myth. According to the transcription and translation by professors Wen Xing and Robert G. Henricks of Dartmouth College, the opening lines are:

太一生水， 水反輔太一， 是以成天。天反輔太一，是以成地。 天地（復相輔）也， 是以成神明。 神明復相輔也， 是以成陰陽。

The Great One (Taiyi) gave birth to water. Water returned and assisted Taiyi, in this way developing heaven. Heaven returned and assisted Taiyi, in this way developing the earth. Heaven and earth [repeatedly assisted each other], in this way developing the "gods above and below." The "gods above and below" repeatedly assisted each other, in this way developing Yin and Yang.

The Taiyi Shengshui was written on 14 bamboo strips and was discovered among the Guodian Chu Slips in 1993 in Hubei, Jingmen, and has not been discovered anywhere else. The text's inclusion in the Guodian "Laozi C" bundle has led some scholars to suggest it may have been considered part of the Tao Te Ching.
