= Robert G. Henricks =

American theologian (born 1943)

Robert Henricks (born 1943) is an American theologian, currently the Preston Kelsey Professor of Religion, Emeritus, at Dartmouth College, specializing in Asian literature and religion.

He wrote a Daodejing translation based on the Mawangdui Silk Texts, and an early work on the Guodian Chu Slips, which includes early versions of the Daodejing.
