= Xu Zheng (Eastern Wu) =

- Chinese: 徐整
Transcriptions
Standard Mandarin
- Hanyu Pinyin: Xú Zhěng
- Wade–Giles: Hsü^{2} Cheng^{3}

Xu Zheng
- Employer: Eastern Wu
- Known for: Chinese official

Xu Zheng (fl. 200s) was an Eastern Wu official who served as the "Taichang (太常)" and a Daoist author of the "Three Five Historic Records" (Chinese: 三五歷紀; pinyin: Sānwǔ Lìjì, literally: "Three Five Calendar") and Wuyun Linian Ji. The "3-5" refers to the "Three August Ones and Five Emperors" (三皇五帝).

Xu Zheng relates two different variants of the creation myth of Pangu.
