= Tianhuang Emperor (constellation) =

Chinese constellation

Tianhuang Emperor is an ancient Chinese constellation, located in the Purple Forbidden enclosure, surrounded by the Gouchen, is one of the symbols of the emperor in astrology (also related to the emperor, there are Northern Pole, Taiyi, and Tianyi.) . Although the present-day Polaris (Alpha Ursae Minoris) is located at the tip of the handle of a ladle (the tail of a small bear), around 1100 B.C. the north pole distance of Beta Ursa Minoris was about 6.5 degrees and was the closest Pole Star to the North Pole of the heavens and was called Emperor (帝, tei).

And apart from being an object of worship, there was also a constellation named the Tianhuang Emperor. The name is found in "Kaiyuan Zyutsukyou" (The Divination Sutra), "Volume 69: Gan Ji Zhong Guan Zui". In the "Book of Jin (晋書)", there is a description in the "Astronomical Records" that "one star in the mouth is said to be the Tianhuang Emperor. This "mouth" refers to the quadrilateral of the constellation Gouchen, which guards the Emperor's palace, the Purple Palace where the Emperor resides, and is depicted by its second star (Ursa Major, 4th magnitude), first star (Alpha Polaris, 2nd magnitude), fifth star (Cepheus HD5848, 4th magnitude), and sixth star (HD217382, 5th magnitude). The Emperor is the 5th magnitude star (HD212710) in the quadrilateral. In the "Wakan sansai zue", the Emperor is also depicted in the position of the "mouth", but this drawing is inaccurate. Schlegel, a Dutch orientalist, identified Alpha Ursa Minor as the Tianhuang Emperor. However, according to Osaki, the identification by Schlegel "cannot be considered a first-class source."

Chinese star names	modern star names	Constellation	Remarks
Tianhuang Emperor	HD 212710 (HIP 109693, HR 8546)	Cepheus	
