= Three Sovereigns and Five Emperors =

Mythological divine rulers of ancient China

Three Sovereigns and Five Emperors 三皇五帝
- Government: Monarchy
Succeeded by
Xia dynasty

Three Sovereigns and Five Emperors
- Chinese: 三皇五帝
Transcriptions
Standard Mandarin
- Hanyu Pinyin: Sān huáng wǔ dì
- Bopomofo: ㄙㄢ ㄏㄨㄤˊ ㄨˇ ㄉㄧˋ
- Wade–Giles: San^{1} Huang^{2} Wu^{3} Ti^{4}
- Tongyong Pinyin: San huáng wǔ dì

According to Chinese mythology and traditional Chinese historiography, the Three Sovereigns and Five Emperors (Chinese: 三皇五帝; pinyin: Sān huáng wǔ dì) were a series of sage Chinese emperors, and the first Emperors of China. Today, they are considered culture heroes, but they were widely worshipped as divine "ancestral spirits" in ancient times. According to received history, the period they existed in preceded the Xia dynasty, although they were thought to exist in later periods to an extent in incorporeal forms that aided the Chinese people, especially with the stories of Nüwa existing as a spirit in the Shang dynasty and Shennong being identified as the godly form of Hou Ji and a founder of the Zhou dynasty.

In myth, the Three Sovereigns were demigods who used their abilities to help create mankind and impart to them essential skills and knowledge. The Five Emperors were exemplary sages who possessed great moral character, and were from a golden age when "communications between the human order and the divine were central to all life" and where the sages embodied the divine, or aided humans in communicating divine forces.

In this period the abdication system was used before Qi of Xia violently seized power and established a hereditary monarchy.

== History ==
Taoist beliefs consist of parables involving shamanistic themes, which is origin of most ancient stories about the Sovereigns Fuxi, Nüwa, and Shennong. The idea of the existence of five emperors appeared in the 5th century BC. Scholars believe the tradition of susception appeared in the early Warring States period to support the political agenda of the ministers, that frequently overthrew their state rulers.

== Variations ==
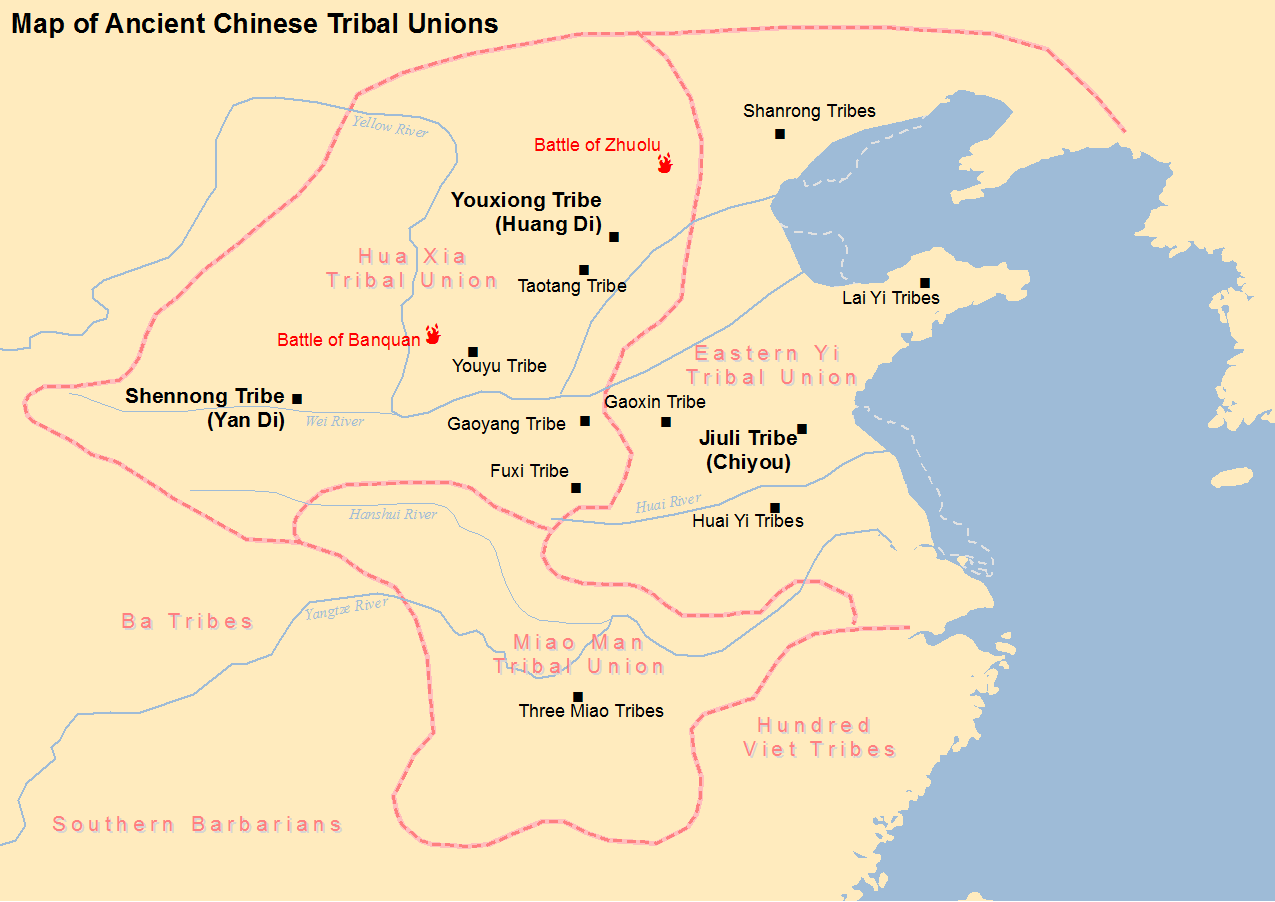
Map of tribes and tribal unions in Ancient China, including the tribes led by the Yellow Emperor, Emperor Yan and Chiyou.

There are six to seven known variations on which people constitute the Three Sovereigns and the Five Emperors, depending on the source. Many of the known sources were written in much later dynasties.

Groupings of the Three Sovereigns consist of some combination of the following: Fuxi, Nüwa, Shennong, Suiren, Zhu Rong, Gonggong, the Heavenly Sovereign, the Earthly Sovereign, the Human Sovereign (in two varieties), and the Yellow Emperor.

Groupings of the Five Emperors consist of some combination of the following: the Yellow Emperor, Zhuanxu, Emperor Ku, Emperor Yao, Emperor Shun, Shaohao, Taihao, and the Yan Emperor.

=== Three Sovereigns ===
The Three Sovereigns, sometimes known as the Three August Ones, were said to be god-kings or demigods who used their magical powers, divine powers, or being in harmony with the Tao to improve the lives of their people. Because of their lofty virtue, they lived to a great age and ruled over a period of great peace.

The Sovereigns have elements in common with xian from the Taoist pantheon, such as the Human Sovereign's cloud-chariot and their supernatural abilities. Upon his death, the Yellow Emperor was "said to have become" a xian.

The Yellow Emperor is supposedly the ancestor of the Huaxia people. The Mausoleum of the Yellow Emperor was established in Shaanxi to commemorate the ancestry legend.

The Three Sovereigns are ascribed various identities in different historical texts, as shown in the table below:

According to source	Three Sovereigns
Records of the Grand Historian, addition by Sima Zhen	Heavenly Sovereign, Earthly Sovereign, Tai Sovereign or Fu Xi, Nüwa, Shennong
Sovereign series (帝王世系)	Fu Xi, Shennong, Yellow Emperor
Shiben	Fu Xi, Shennong, Yellow Emperor
Baihu Tongyi (白虎通義)	(1st variation); Fu Xi, Shennong, Zhu Rong (2nd variation); Fu Xi, Shennong, Suiren
Fengsu Tongyi	Fu Xi, Nüwa, Shennong
Yiwen Leiju	Heavenly Sovereign, Earthly Sovereign; Human Sovereign
Tongjian Waiji (通鑑外紀)	Fu Xi, Shennong, Gonggong
Chunqiu yundou shu (春秋運斗樞); Chunqiu yuanming bao (春秋元命苞)	Fu Xi, Nüwa, Shennong
Shangshu dazhuan (尚書大傳)	Fu Xi, Shennong, Suiren
Diwang shiji (帝王世紀)	Fu Xi, Shennong, Yellow Emperor

=== Five Emperors ===
The Five Emperors were traditionally thought to have invented "fire, writing and irrigation". Like the Three Sovereigns, they are ascribed different identities depending on historical source, as shown in the table below:

According to source	Five Emperors
Records of the Grand Historian	Yellow Emperor, Zhuanxu, Ku, Yao, Shun
Sovereign Series (帝王世紀)	Shaohao, Zhuanxu, Ku, Yao, Shun
I Ching	Taihao (太昊), Yan Emperor, Yellow Emperor, Yao, Shun
Comments of a Recluse, Qianfulun (潛夫論)	Taihao, Yan, Yellow Emperor, Shaohao, Zhuanxu
Zizhi tongjian waiji, (資治通鑒外紀)	Yellow Emperor, Shaohao, Zhuanxu, Ku, Yao

=== Five Emperors family tree ===
^{(1)} Yellow Emperor
^{(2)} Shaohao	Changyi
Jiaoji	^{(3)} Zhuanxu
^{(4)} Ku	Qiongchan	Sb.
^{(5)} Zhi	^{(6)} Yao	Houji	Jingkang 敬康	Sb.
Danzhu	Juwang	Sb.
Luoming 罗名
Qiaoniu 橋牛	Gun
Gusou	^{(8)} Yu
Ehuang	^{(7)} Shun	Nuying
Shangjun

== Creation myth ==
There is the legend of the Four clans (四氏) who took part in creating the world, Youchao clan (有巢氏), Suiren clan (燧人氏), Fu Xi clan (伏羲氏), and Shennong clan (神農氏).

== Legacy ==
These Sovereigns and Emperors are said to have helped introduce the use of fire, taught people how to build houses, and invented farming. The Yellow Emperor's wife is credited with the invention of silk culture. The discovery of medicine and invention of the calendar and Chinese script are also credited to the kings. After their era, Yu the Great founded the Xia dynasty, traditionally considered the first dynasty in Chinese historiography.

== Gallery ==
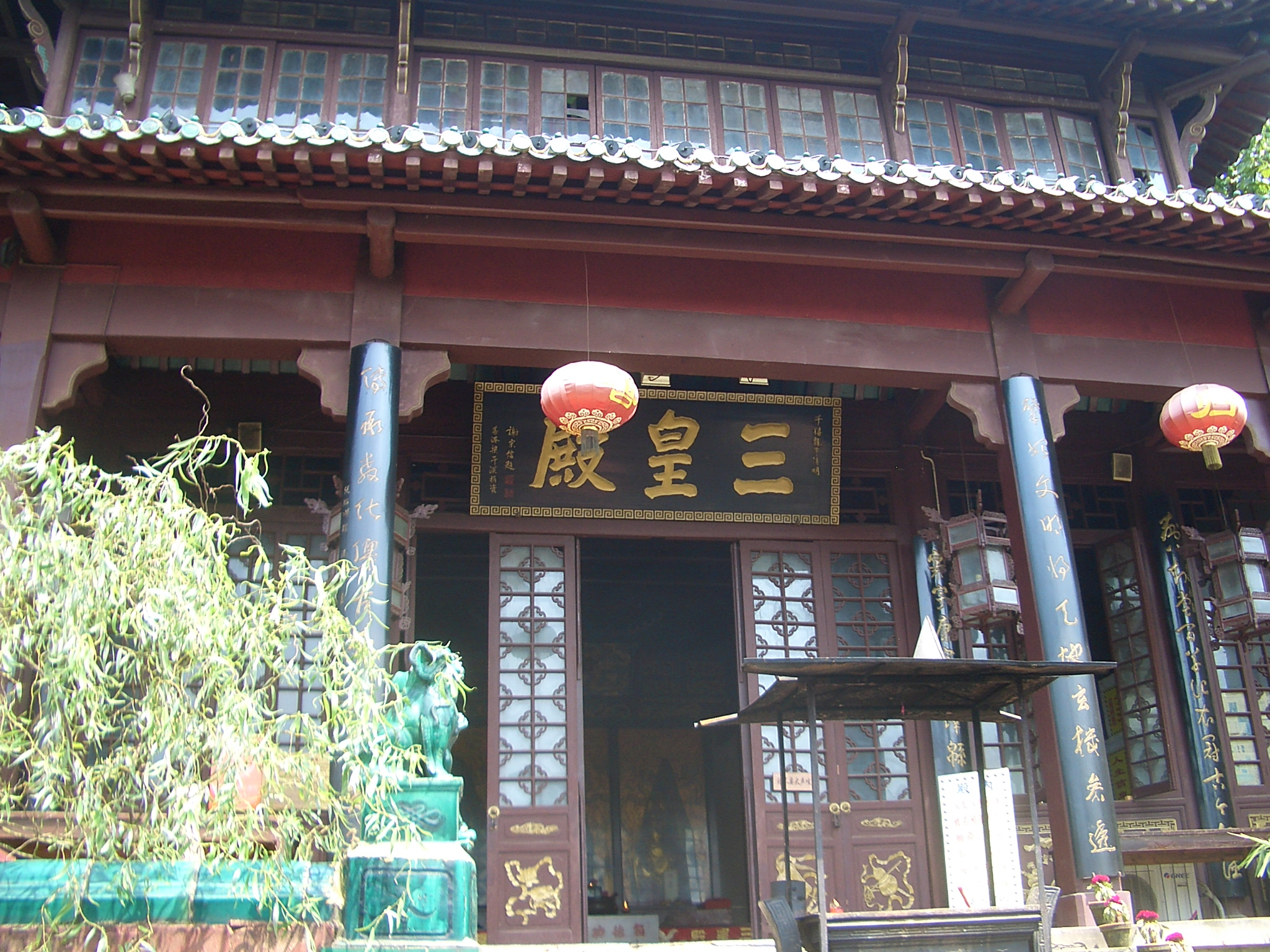
The Hall of the Three Sovereigns in Changchun Si (长春寺), a Taoist temple in Wuhan

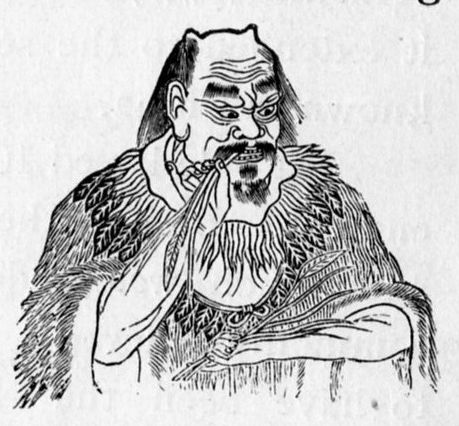
Shennong tasting herbs to discover their qualities

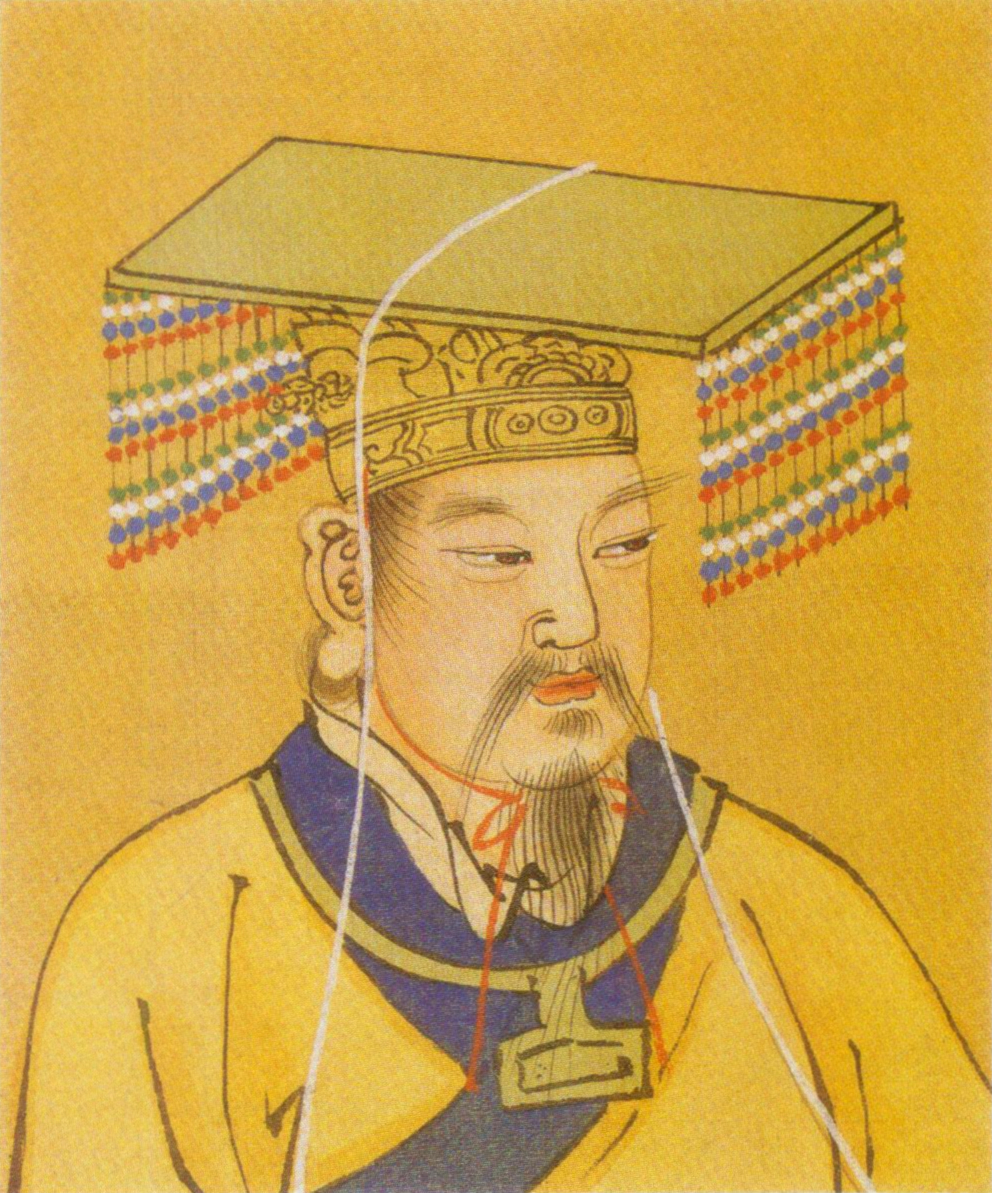
Historian's depiction of the Yellow Emperor

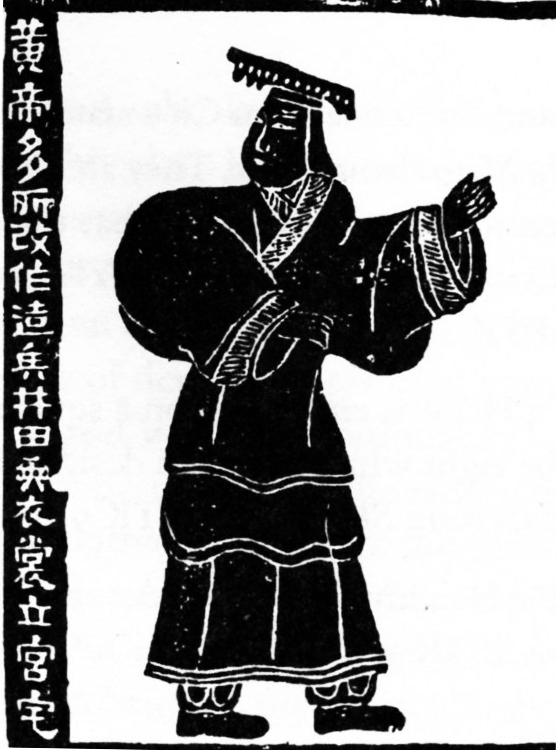
Another depiction of the Yellow Emperor

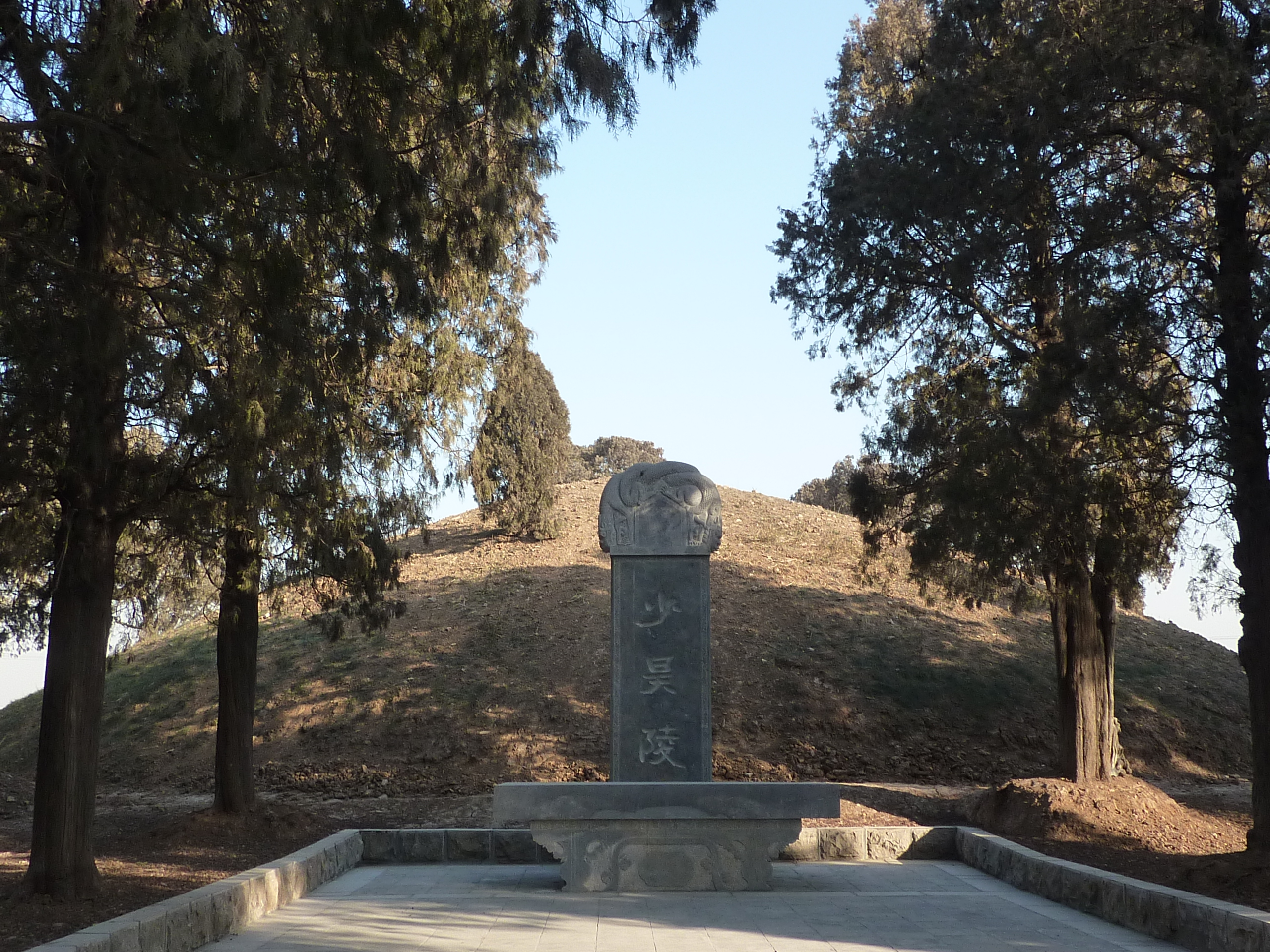
Shaohao Tomb near Qufu, Shandong

== See also ==
- Taotang clan
- Youyu clan
