= Xing Wen =

Chinese researcher

- 邢文
- Born: January 1, 1965 (age 60)
- Education: Nanjing College of Food Economy (B.A.); Nanjing Normal University (M.A.); Chinese Academy of Social Sciences (Ph.D.)
- Awards: The 1st China National Award for Outstanding Doctoral Dissertations (1999); The 2nd China Fine Arts Award (2014)
- Scientific career
- Fields: Mathematical Art History, Interdisciplinary Chinese Studies, Chinese Manuscript Culture
- Institutions: Dartmouth College
- Academic advisors: Li Xueqin李學勤, Kwang-chih Chang張光直

Chinese name
- Chinese: 邢文
Transcriptions
Standard Mandarin
- Hanyu Pinyin: Xíng Wén

Xing Wen, or Wen Xing (Chinese: 邢文; pinyin: Xíng Wén; Wade–Giles: Wen Hsing; born 1965) is a Chinese scholar and researcher in Chinese art, archaeology, and classical Chinese studies. He is Robert 1932 and Barbara Black Professor in Asian Studies, Emeritus, and Professor of Asian Societies, Cultures, and Languages, Emeritus at Dartmouth College.

== Life and education ==
Xing Wen was born in 1965. He attended the Nanjing College of Food Economy, current Nanjing University of Finance and Economics as an undergraduate student, graduating in 1986 with a B.A. in Economics, after which he taught planning and statistics courses at the college for a few years. He then went to Nanjing Normal University for graduate study and obtained his M.A. in Chinese art history in 1992. He did his Ph.D. work on the Mawangdui silk manuscripts both at the Graduate School of Chinese Academy of Social Sciences under the guidance of Professor Li Xueqin 李學勤 and in the Anthropology Department at Harvard University as a post-doctoral student of Professor Kwang-chih Chang 張光直. He received his Ph.D. in history from Chinese Academy of Social Sciences in 1996 with a dissertation on the silk manuscript version of the Zhouyi 周易, i.e., I Ching. This dissertation was awarded the 1st China National Award for Outstanding Doctoral Dissertations in 1999.

== Career ==
Xing was Robert 1932 and Barbara Black Professor in Asian Studies at Dartmouth College and Distinguished Professor of Chinese Department and Philosophy and History Research Institute at Southwest Jiaotong University. He was Director of the Center for Research on Bamboo and Silk Manuscripts in the School of Archaeology and Museology at Peking University during 2000–2002, chaired the Department of Asian and Middle Eastern Languages and Literatures at Dartmouth College in 2014, held the directorship of The Dartmouth Institute for Calligraphy and Manuscript Culture in China since 2014, and served as Associate Dean for Disciplinary Development, Academic Research, and Internationalization of the School of Humanities at Southwest Jiaotong University from 2017 to 2020.

== Controversies ==
Xing was involved in several controversies regarding the authenticity of some purchased bamboo-slip manuscripts collected by top universities in China.

=== Zhejiang University Bamboo Slips ===
In 2012, Xing published a series of articles in China's foremost national newspaper Guangming Daily to argue that the so-called Warring States period (475-221 B.C.) bamboo slips collected by Zhejiang University were fake. Professor Cao Jingyan 曹錦炎 of Zhejiang University argued that Xing's articles were misleading since he never touched any real bamboo slips. Liu Shaogang 劉紹剛, research fellow of the Chinese Academy of Cultural Heritage, also challenged Xing's approach of calligraphic examination.

=== Peking University Bamboo Slips ===
In 2016, Xing published several articles in Guangming Daily again to challenge the authenticity of the bamboo-slip version of the Laozi, i.e., the Tao Te Ching, collected by Peking University. Professor Alan Chan of The Chinese University of Hong Kong included Xing's argument in the Stanford Encyclopedia of Philosophy. Chinese professors Li Kai 李開 and Yao Xiaoou 姚小鷗 and Western scholars Christopher Foster and Thies Staack all challenged Xing's argument from various perspectives.

== Interdisciplinary initiatives ==
Xing is known for his initiative and expertise in Mathematical Art History 數理美術史 and Mathematical Humanities 數理人文學. In 1999, he formally proposed to establish a new field of study, "The Study of Bamboo-slip and Silk Manuscripts" 中國簡帛學, at a Wuhan University international conference. In recent years, he proposed several new interdisciplinary fields, such as the Chinese Mathematical Philosophy 中國數理哲學 (2017), the Authentication Studies of Excavated Manuscripts 簡帛辨偽學 (2018), Cognitive Manuscriptology 認知手稿學 (2018), Cognitive Bamboo-and-Silk Manuscriptology 認知簡帛學 (2018), Cognitive Paleography 認知古文字學 (2019), and Cognitive Oracle-bone Studies 認知甲骨學 (2019). His new book on mathematical art history is also informed by artificial intelligence and data science.

== Selected works ==
- Xing, Wen (2014). Dao, Neo-Confucian Principle, and Chan Buddhism in Chinese Calligraphy and Painting 道理禪與中國書畫 (in Chinese). Beijing: Academy Press. ISBN 978-7-5077-4540-5 Awarded the 2nd China Fine Arts Award.
- ——— (1997). Research in the Silk Manuscript Zhouyi 帛書周易研究 (in Chinese). Beijing: People's Press. ISBN 7-01-002683-1.
- ——— (2015). Initial Explorations on the Chu Bamboo-Slip Calligraphy 楚簡書法探論 (in Chinese). Shanghai: Zhongxi Book Company. ISBN 9787547509296.
- ———. "Graph-book" and Layout Design in Ancient China. DNB. and more books
