= Yiwen Leiju =

Chinese encyclopedia

- Traditional Chinese: 藝文類聚
- Simplified Chinese: 艺文类聚
- Literal meaning: Collection of Literature Arranged by Categories
Transcriptions
Standard Mandarin
- Hanyu Pinyin: Yìwén Lèijù

The Yiwen Leiju (藝文類聚), or translated as Encyclopedia of Literary Collections, is a Chinese leishu encyclopedia completed by Ouyang Xun in 624 under the Tang dynasty. Other contributors include Linghu Defen and Chen Shuda.

Yiwen Leiju is divided into 46 sections and many subsections, covering a vast number of subjects and including many quotations from older works, which are well cited.

Pages from a Southern Song dynasty Shaoxing period edition of the Yiwen Leiju, from the Shanghai Library

Pages from a Ming dynasty Jiajing period edition of Yiwen Leiju, from the Harvard University

Pages from a Ming dynasty Wanli period edition of Yiwen Leiju, from the Harvard University

Pages from a Ming dynasty Wanli period edition of Yiwen Leiju, from the National Archives of Japan

== Content ==
The book is classified into 46 sections, each containing 727 sub-sections.

- Heaven (Volumes 1-2)
- Seasonal Events (Volumes 3-5)
- Earth (Volume 6)
- Provinces (Volume 6)
- Mountains (Volumes 7-8)
- Water (Volumes 8-9)
- Talismans (Volume 10)
- Emperors (Volumes 11-14)
- Empresses and Consorts (Volume 15)
- Palace Management (Volume 16)
- Humans (Volumes 17-37)
- Rituals (Volumes 38-40)
- Music (Volumes 41-44)
- Officials (Volumes 45-50)
- Titles and Ranks (Volume 51)
- Government (Volumes 52-53)
- Criminal Law (Volume 54)
- Miscellaneous Writings (Volumes 55-58)
- Military (Volume 59)
- Military Equipment (Volume 60)
- Residences (Volumes 61-64)
- Industry (Volumes 65-66)
- Clothing and Crowns (Volume 67)
- Ceremonial Ornaments (Volume 68)
- Clothing (Volumes 69-70)
- Boats and Carriages (Volume 71)
- Food (Volume 72)
- Miscellaneous Objects (Volume 73)
- Craftsmanship (Volume 74)
- Magic and Magic (Volume 75)
- Inner Canon (Volumes 76-77)
- Supernatural Phenomena (Volumes 78-79)
- Fire (Volume 80)
- Medicinal Herbs (Volumes 81-82)
- Jewels (Volumes 83-84)
- Grains (Volume 85)
- Fabrics (Volume 85)
- Fruits (Volumes 86-87)
- Wood (Volumes 88-89)
- Birds (Volumes 90-92)
- Beasts (Volumes 93-95)
- Scales and Shells (Volumes 96-97)
- Insects and Beasts (Volume 97)
- Auspicious Phenomena (Volumes 98-99) Calamities (Volume 100)
