= Unita Blackwell Freedom House =

Unita Blackwell Property is a historic site in Mayersville, Mississippi, associated with Unita Blackwell, a civil rights activist and the first African American woman elected mayor in the state. The property was listed on the National Register of Historic Places after approval by the United States Secretary of the Interior, following a recommendation from the Mississippi National Register Review Board. The site includes structures connected to Blackwell’s civil rights activism as well as her later political career. The property consists of the Freedom House, the Ranch House, and the neighbor’s shotgun house.

== Unita Blackwell Property and Civil Rights Era (1964–1970) ==
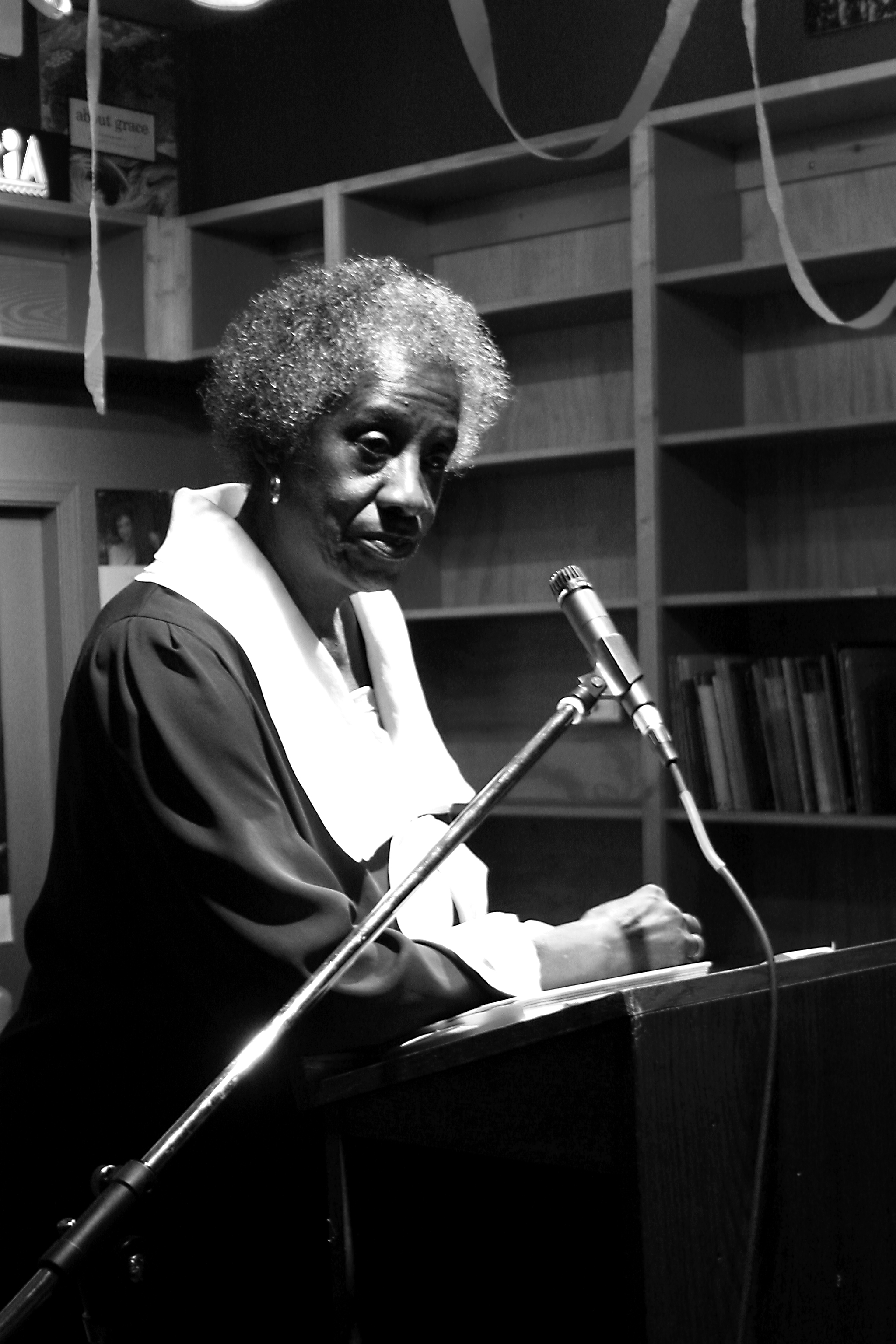
Unita Blackwell

Unita Zelma Blackwell (March 18, 1933 – May 13, 2019) was an American civil rights activist who was the first African-American woman to be elected mayor in the U.S. state of Mississippi. Blackwell was a project director for the Student Nonviolent Coordinating Committee (SNCC) and helped organize voter drives for African Americans across Mississippi. She was also a leader of the US–China Peoples Friendship Association, a group dedicated to promoting cultural exchange between the United States and China. She served as an advisor to six US presidents: Lyndon Johnson, Richard Nixon, Gerald Ford, Jimmy Carter, Ronald Reagan, and Bill Clinton.

Blackwell’s primary residence, dubbed Freedom House, was a central meeting place for civil rights activity between 1964 and 1970. During this period, it hosted organizations such as the Mississippi Freedom Democratic Party (MFDP), the Council of Federated Organizations (COFO), and the Student Nonviolent Coordinating Committee (SNCC). The house functioned as a local hub for organizing efforts related to voting rights, political participation, and community mobilization.

The Ranch House, also part of the property, was recognized for its association with Blackwell’s work during her tenure as mayor of Mayersville. It was used for political meetings, work sessions, and civic planning connected to her administrative priorities and public service.

A neighboring shotgun house was included in the National Register listing for both its architectural value and its historical association with Blackwell’s civil rights leadership.

== Preservation and future use ==
As of 2025, The Lighthouse | Black Girl Projects is collaborating with Blackwell’s family to preserve the property. The organization plans to operate the site as a community center and ultimately establish a museum honoring Blackwell and her legacy.
