= Kwan Hsu =

Biophysics Professor

Kwan Hsu (1913–1995) was a biophysics Professor at Portland State University and cultural liaison for the People's Republic of China.

== Early life ==
Kwan Hsu was born in 1913 in the Guang-Xi Province of China and grew up in Shanghai. Hsu and her father traveled around Southeast Asia after her mother's death, which occurred when she was 4. Her father assisted a radical faction of Kuomintang (the Guangxi Army). While in Japanese-occupied Shanghai, Hsu was the sole breadwinner for brothers and stepmother.

== Education ==
Hsu attended Catholic missionary grammar and high school. She studied at the University of Shanghai and graduated in 1936 with a Bachelor of Science degree, with honors in Physics. She scored the highest in a competition for the American Association of University Women’s scholarship, which allowed her to travel to the U.S. in 1947. She was one of the first foreign women to receive this award after World War II.

After the U.S. government cut ties with the People's Republic of China, she could not return home. She had planned to study abroad for her advanced degree, but those plans were blocked by the outbreak of the Second Sino-Japanese War (1937–45).

She studied at both the University of Minnesota and University of Iowa before enrolling in a program at UC Berkeley. In 1960, Hsu graduated from the University of California, Berkeley with a Ph.D. in Biophysics; she was 47. While at UC Berkeley, she did research at the Donner Lab and wrote her thesis on the radiation effect on the permeability of yeast cells to sodium and potassium ions; it was printed for U.S. Atomic Energy Commission in December 1959.

== Portland State University ==
She moved to Portland in 1964 and took a position as the first Biophysics Professor at Portland State College.

She retired in 1978 but continued to research until 1985. Her main focus was on the creation of artificial lipid membranes, the properties of those membranes, and creating stable models that could be grown in a lab.

== Community and Organizational Involvement ==
When she arrived in Oregon, Hsu became the People's Republic of China cultural liaison to Portland and Oregon. She was a member of the Chinese Scientists and Engineers, the U.S.-China People's Friendship Association (USCPFA), and the Northwest China Council. She worked as a resource for students and researchers from China who were living in the Portland area. She was the community contact for 6 new college professors from Guangxi Teacher's College in Guilin as part of an exchange program with Lewis and Clark College; this was the first large-scale exchange program between Chinese and American colleges.

== Death and legacy ==
Hsu died in November 1995 in Portland, Oregon.
