= Li Rong =

Li Rong may refer to:

- Li Rong (philosopher) (fl. 658–663), Taoist philosopher of the Chinese Tang dynasty
- Li Rong (prince) (812–840), imperial prince of the Chinese Tang dynasty
- Li Rong (fl. 846–874), late Tang dynasty compiler and author of Duyizhi
- Li Rong (linguist) (1920–2002), Chinese linguist and dialectologist
