= Chang-Yun Fan =

Chinese-born American physicist

Chang-Yun "Charlie" Fan (January 7, 1918 – January 21, 2009) was a Chinese-born American physicist.

== Biography ==
Fan's ancestry could be traced back to rulers of Song dynasty China. Setting aside hopes of becoming a scholar, Fan's father instead worked as a farmer in rural Jiangsu. Though illiterate, his mother was entrusted with the position of village arbiter. Chang-Yun Fan was born in 1918, the second of three sons. Because his father was often working, Fan's eldest brother became his role model, from whom he learned to write Chinese characters and essays. Fan's primary school career was interrupted by a gap year due to financial constraints. He was introduced to algebra in middle school, and inspired his interest in mathematics. Fan took another gap year in high school, again because of financial problems. He enrolled at National Central University in 1936, but Fan's education there was held up by the start of the Second Sino-Japanese War in 1937. Fan joined a group of seven other students making their way to NCU in Nanjing. They walked to Zhenjiang, then rode a train to Nanjing. The school, and Fan, continued moving to avoid armed conflict. He spent some time in Wuhan working as a clerk, earning money to continue traveling. In a year, Fan made his way to Chongqing, where the university had relocated. Fan completed his degree in physics in 1941, then remained at the school as a teaching assistant. In 1947, Fan enrolled at the University of Chicago, where he earned a doctorate in physics under the direction of Herbert L. Anderson. Fan remained affiliated with the university after obtaining his doctorate in 1952, serving as a postdoctoral researcher at the Yerkes Observatory under Aden Meinel until 1957. That year, Fan began his teaching career at the University of Arkansas, as an assistant professor, only to return to UChicago in the following year as a senior physicist with the John Alexander Simpson Group and assume an associate research professorship. Fan's association with the Laboratory for Astrophysics and Space Research lasted until 1967, when he was appointed to a professorship within the physics department at the University of Arizona, where he taught until retirement in 1988. In 1975, Fan was elected a fellow of the American Physical Society.

Following the 1972 visit by Richard Nixon to China, Fan established links between Chinese and American scientists through his work with the US-China Peoples Friendship Association. Fan himself made over thirty trips to China, the last of which was a lecture in May 2008. Fan was diagnosed with late stage cancer in November 2008, and died on January 21, 2009, at home in Tucson, Arizona.
