= Yeowarok =

Korean novel

Yeowarok (The Story of Yeowa: this is a case in which the title of the piece differs from the name of the protagonist of the story.)

Yeowarok (女媧錄 The Story of Yeowa), also known as Yeowajeon (女媧傳The Tale of Yeowa), is a novel created based on a readers’ experience of reading a novel in the late Joseon dynasty. Yeowarok features women in a total of over 14 classical novels, including Yussisamdaerok (劉氏三代錄 The Story of Three Generations of the Yu Family), So Hyeonseongrok (蘇賢聖錄 The Story of So Hyeonseong). Most of the women are assessed by Mun Changseong, or Princess Jinyang from Yussisamdaerok. It is considered to be linked to other stories that critique novels, such as Tusaekjiyeonui (鬪色誌演義 A Fiction based on a True Story about Women Competing for Their Beauty) and Hwangneungmonghwangi (黃陵夢還記 A Story about Meeting the Two Queens at Hwangneung Tomb). It is also known as a derivative work of Yussisamdaerok.

== Authorship ==
The author of Yeowarok is currently unknown but is assumed to have been an avid reader of Korean classical literature, who used the information about various characters in several different novels to create a new novel. As many of the characters borrowed from other novels are women, some presume the author to have been a woman. It is estimated to have been written in the 18th century and widely enjoyed across the span of two centuries from the 19th to the 20th centuries.

== Plot ==
Yeowa (女媧, Pinyin: Nüwa), the mother goddess of Chinese mythology, is giving a lecture about the way of the heavens when strange energy begins to rise from the earth. The energy is coming from women at Hwangneung Tomb who were competing for their beauty and calling themselves by the posthumous titles of virtuous emperors and wise kings in front of Emperor Shun's two queens. When Yeowa becomes enraged at the irreverence of the women, Bokhui (伏羲) sends Mun Changseong and Mun Ilseong down to earth to handle the situation at Hawngneung Tomb.

Descending to Hwangneung Tomb along with Mun Ilseong, Mun Changseong points out the women’ lack of reverence and strips them of the titles they have conferred on themselves. Mun Changseong then criticizes each woman's accomplishments and failures, rearranges their ranks, sends away some of the women from the Hwangneung Tomb, and brings in new women to the tomb to be servants to the two queens. After resolving the situation at Hwangneung Tomb, Mun Changseong and Mun Ilseong return to the celestial realm, and the women who have been left behind at the tomb praise Mun Changseong's brilliance. The story of Mun Changseong's past life is then introduced in connection with Yussisamdaerok.

Overjoyed at the work carried out by Mun Changseong and Mun Ilseong, Yeowa tells the Jade Emperor about their accomplishments. The emperor praises them and appoints Mun Changseong as the Grand Supervisor of the World Under Heaven (天下文脈 大總管). On the way back to the palace, Mun Changseong gets into an argument with Bodhisattva Gwaneum (觀音, pinyin: Guanyi), eventually persuading the latter. However, Gwaneum's disciple, novice monk Mokcha, fights Mun Changseong, who subdues him by pinning him with a brush. At this, Gwaneum goes to Buddha, asking for revenge, but Buddha orders Gwaneum to respect Mun's dignity, strengthening Mun Changseong's reputation even more.

== Features and Significance ==
Yeowajeon was created based on the reading experience of numerous novels that were circulated in the late Joseon dynasty, and it is an important source that allows us to identify the trend in which readers of the time read novels. In the process of critiquing and interpreting previous novels, the author of Yeowajeon uses the women characters in those novels and recreates them into new people, which shows traces of active reading. In particular, the focus on Mun Changseong, who is the actual protagonist of this story, shows that this novel not only emphasizes feminine ethics but also reflects expectations of women to display their skills and talents.

== Text ==
In 1992, Lee Su-bong introduced Yeowarok as an edition of Yussisamdaerok. Then in 1997, it was rediscovered as an independent novel, titled Yeowarok, by Song Seong-uk. Currently there are 20 handwritten editions of this novel.
