= Sino-American Friendship Association =

Nonprofit organization based in New York City

- Formation: 1992; 34 years ago
- Type: 501(c)(3) organization
- Headquarters: New York City
- Website: www.safaus.org

The Sino-American Friendship Association (SAFA) is a nonprofit organization based in New York City whose stated aim is to develop cross-cultural collaboration between the United States and China. SAFA assists schools in running Chinese cultural clubs and hosting "Chinese culture weeks." SAFA also promotes traditional Chinese medicine, participates in the Macy's Thanksgiving Day Parade and Times Square Ball Drop, and has organized trips to mainland China for members to meet with officials of the United Front Work Department. SAFA has organized trips for American mayors to China with the support of the Chinese People's Association for Friendship with Foreign Countries. In 2012, SAFA paid for a promotional slideshow of Xi Jinping on a Times Square jumbotron during one of his visits to the United States.

SAFA's honorary president is Yuan Xikun. The group's advisory board includes officials such as Bingde Zhou, former vice president of China News Service, and former Chinese consul general in New York Zhongwen Qu.

The group garnered public attention in August 2022 following its sponsorship of a New York Mets game that included memorabilia with the flag of the People's Republic of China. SAFA subsequently stated that it is "not involved in united front work."

== See also ==
- US–China Peoples Friendship Association
- Chinese People's Association for Friendship with Foreign Countries
- Henan Association of Eastern America
