= Nüwa =

Mother goddess of Chinese mythology

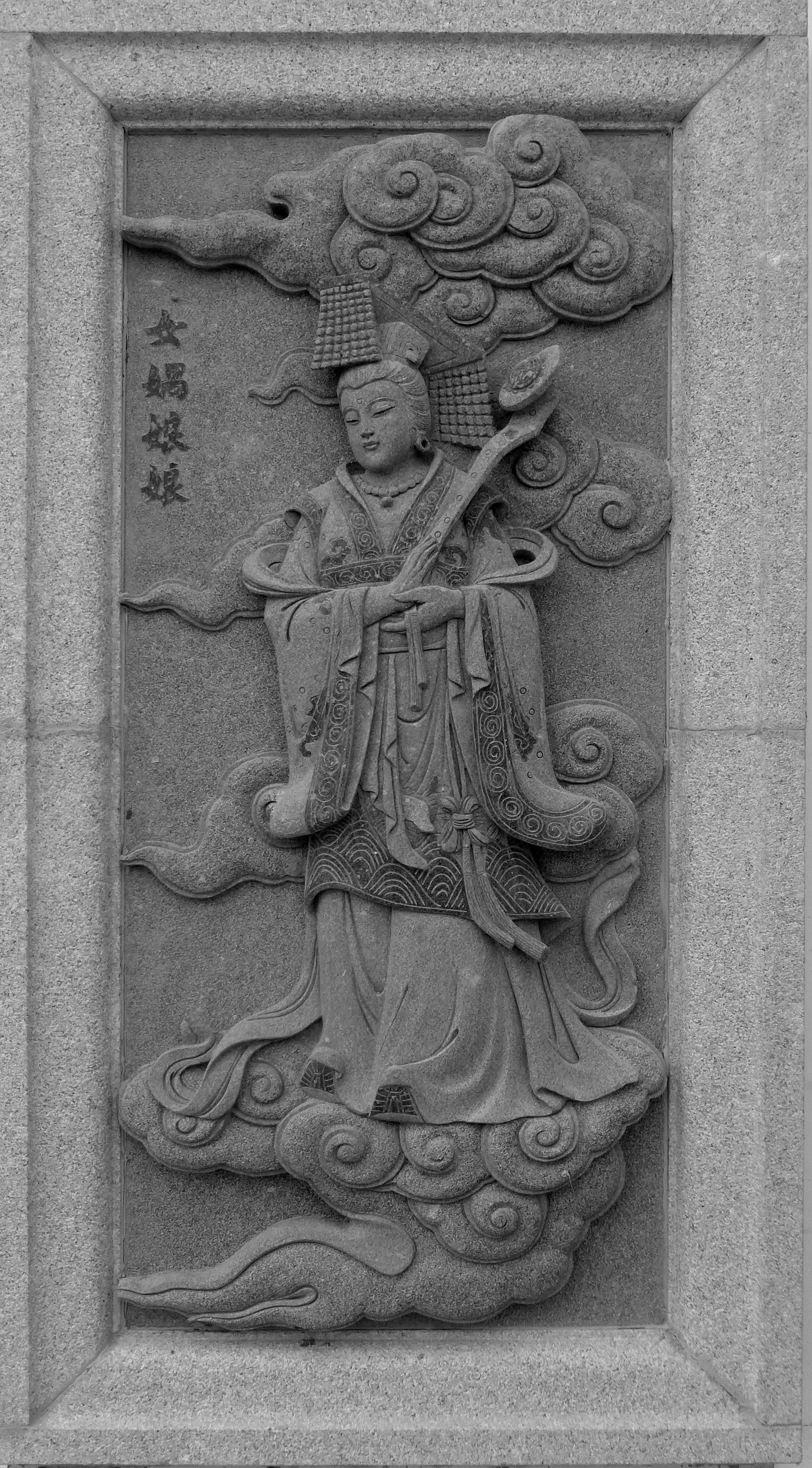
- Relief of Nüwa at the Ping Sien Si Temple in Perak, Malaysia

Chinese name
- Traditional Chinese: 女媧
- Simplified Chinese: 女娲
Transcriptions
Standard Mandarin
- Hanyu Pinyin: Nǚwā
- Bopomofo: ㄋㄩˇ ㄨㄚ
- Wade–Giles: Nü^{3}-wa^{1}
- Yale Romanization: Nyǔ-Wā
- IPA: [nỳ.wá]
Yue: Cantonese
- Yale Romanization: Néuihwō
- Jyutping: neoi5 wo1
- IPA: [nɵɥ˩˧.wɔ˥]
Southern Min
- Hokkien POJ: Lú-o
Middle Chinese
- Middle Chinese: nrɨa^{X} kwue

Vietnamese name
- Vietnamese alphabet: Nữ Oa
- Chữ Hán: 女媧

Korean name
- Hangul: 여와
- Hanja: 女媧
Transcriptions
- Revised Romanization: Yeowa
- McCune–Reischauer: Yŏwa

Japanese name
- Kanji: 女媧
- Kana: じょか
Transcriptions
- Romanization: Joka

Nüwa, also read Nügua, is a mother goddess, culture hero, and/or member of the Three Sovereigns of Chinese mythology. She is a goddess in Chinese folk religion, Chinese Buddhism, Confucianism and Taoism. She is credited with creating humanity and repairing the Pillar of Heaven.

As creator of mankind, she molded humans individually by hand with yellow clay. In other stories where she fulfills this role, she only created nobles and/or the rich out of yellow soil. The stories vary on the other details about humanity's creation, but it was a tradition commonly believed in ancient China that she created commoners from brown mud. A story holds that she was tired when she created "the rich and the noble", so all others, or "cord-made people", were created from her "dragg[ing] a string through mud".

In the Huainanzi, there is a description of a great battle between deities that broke the pillars supporting Heaven and caused great devastation. There was great flooding, and Heaven had collapsed. Nüwa was the one who patched the holes in Heaven with five colored stones, and she used the legs of a tortoise to mend the pillars.

There are many instances of her in literature across China which detail her in creation stories, and today, she remains a figure important to Chinese culture. She is one of the most venerated Chinese goddesses alongside Guanyin and Mazu.

In Chinese mythology, the goddess Nüwa is a legendary progenitor of all human beings. She also creates a magic stone. Her husband Fu Xi is suggested to be the progenitor of divination and the patron saint of numbers.

== Name ==
The character pinyin: nü (Chinese: 女; lit. 'female') is a common prefix on the names of goddesses. The proper name is wa, also read as gua (媧). The Chinese character is unique to this name. Birrell translates it as 'lovely', but notes that it "could be construed as 'frog'", which is consistent with her aquatic myth. In Chinese, the word for 'whirlpool' is wo (渦), which shares the same pronunciation with the word for 'snail' (蝸). These characters all have their right side constructed by the word wa (咼), which can be translated as 'spiral' or 'helix' as noun, and as 'spin' or 'rotate' when as verb, to describe the 'helical movement'. This mythical meaning has also been symbolically pictured as compasses in the hand which can be found on many paintings and portraits associated with her.

Her reverential name is Wahuang (媧皇; 'Empress Wa').

== Description ==
Image of Nüwa from Gujin Tushu Jicheng by Chen Menglei, Qing dynasty

The Huainanzi relates Nüwa to the time when Heaven and Earth were in disruption:

Going back to more ancient times, the four pillars were broken; the nine provinces were in tatters. Heaven did not completely cover [the earth]; Earth did not hold up [Heaven] all the way around [its circumference]. Fires blazed out of control and could not be extinguished; water flooded in great expanses and would not recede. Ferocious animals ate blameless people; predatory birds snatched the elderly and the weak. Thereupon, Nüwa smelted together five-colored stones in order to patch up the azure sky, cut off the legs of the great turtle to set them up as the four pillars, killed the black dragon to provide relief for Ji Province, and piled up reeds and cinders to stop the surging waters. The azure sky was patched; the four pillars were set up; the surging waters were drained; the province of Ji was tranquil; crafty vermin died off; blameless people [preserved their] lives. (Note: A different translation of the same text is also given in Lewis.)

The catastrophes were supposedly caused by the battle between the deities Gonggong and Zhuanxu (an event that was mentioned earlier in the Huainanzi), (Note: "In ancient times Gong Gong and Zhuan Xu fought, each seeking to become the thearch. Enraged, they crashed against Mount Buzhou; Heaven's pillars broke; the cords of Earth snapped. Heaven tilted in the northwest, and thus the sun and moon, stars and planets shifted in that direction. Earth became unfull in the southeast, and thus the watery floods and mounding soils subsided in that direction.") the five-colored stones symbolize the five Chinese elements (wood, fire, earth, metal, and water), the black dragon was the essence of water and thus cause of the floods, Ji Province serves metonymically for the central regions (the Sinitic world). Following this, the Huainanzi tells about how the sage-rulers Nüwa and Fuxi set order over the realm by following the Way (道) and its potency (德).

The Classic of Mountains and Seas, dated between the Warring States period and the Han dynasty, describes Nüwa's intestines as being scattered into ten spirits.

In Liezi (c. 475 – 221 BC), Chapter 5 "Questions of Tang" (卷第五 湯問篇), author Lie Yukou describes Nüwa repairing the original imperfect heaven using five-colored stones, and cutting the legs off a tortoise to use as struts to hold up the sky.

In Songs of Chu (c. 340 – 278 BC), Chapter 3 "Asking Heaven" (问天), author Qu Yuan writes "Who shaped the body of Nüwa?". This is one of the earliest recorded appearances of Nüwa. It has been interpreted as asking the philosophical question of infinite regress: "Nüwa has created humans, but who created her?".

In Shuowen Jiezi (c. 58 – 147 AD), China's earliest dictionary, under the entry for Nüwa author Xu Shen describes her as being both the sister and the wife of Fuxi. Nüwa and Fuxi were pictured as having snake-like tails interlocked in an Eastern Han dynasty mural in the Wuliang Temple in Jiaxiang county, Shandong province.

In Fengsu Tongyi (c. 140 - 206 AD), in a lost fragment only known from quoting by the Taiping Yulan, author Ying Shao describes how Nüwa is commonly thought to have created life:

It is popularly said that when Heaven and Earth had opened forth, but before there were human beings, Nü-kua created men by patting yellow earth together. But the work tasked her strength and left her no free time, so that she then dragged a string through mud, thus heaping it up so as to make it into men. Therefore the rich and the noble are those men of yellow earth, whereas the poor and the lowly — all ordinary people — are those cord-made men.

In Duyi Zhi (獨異志; c. 846 – 874 AD), Volume 3, author Li Rong gives this description.

Long ago, when the world first began, there were two people, Nü Kua and her older brother. They lived on Mount K'un-lun. And there were not yet any ordinary people in the world. They talked about becoming husband and wife, but they felt ashamed. So the brother at once went with his sister up Mount K'un-lun and made this prayer: "Oh Heaven, if Thou wouldst send us two forth as man and wife, then make all the misty vapor gather. If not, then make all the misty vapor disperse." At this, the misty vapor immediately gathered. When the sister became intimate with her brother, they plaited some grass to make a fan to screen their faces. Even today, when a man takes a wife, they hold a fan, which is a symbol of what happened long ago.

There are stories that have her as the "consort" of Fuxi rather than his sister.

In Yuchuan Ziji (玉川子集 c. 618 – 907 AD), Chapter 3 ("與馬異結交詩" 也稱 "女媧本是伏羲婦"), author Lu Tong describes Nüwa as the wife of Fuxi.

In Siku Quanshu, Sima Zhen (679–732) provides commentary on the prologue chapter to Sima Qian's Shiji, "Supplemental to the Historic Record: History of the Three August Ones", wherein it is found that the Three August Ones are Nüwa, Fuxi, and Shennong; Fuxi and Nüwa have the same last name, Feng (風). (Note: Sima Zhen's commentary is included with the later Siku Quanshu compiled by Ji Yun and Lu Xixiong(陸錫熊).)

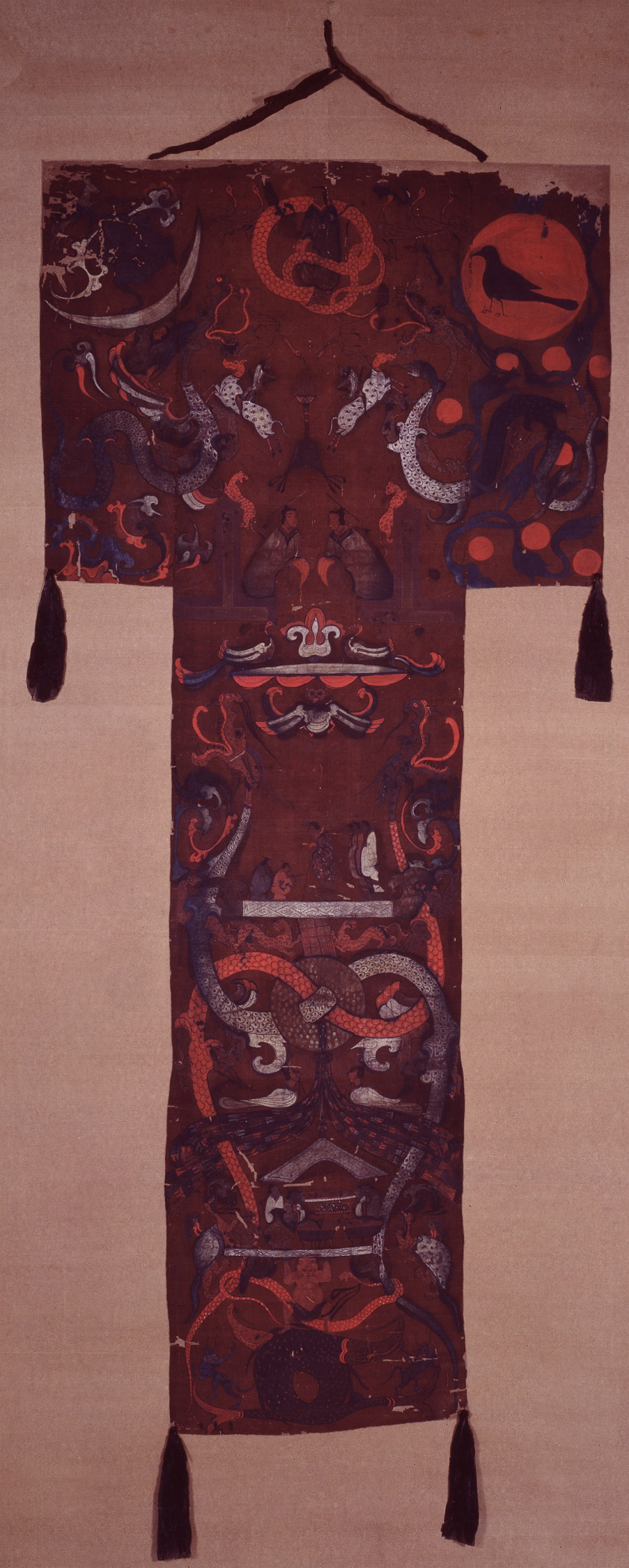
Nüwa as depicted on one of the Mawangdui silk banners, Han dynasty

In the collection Four Great Books of Song (c. 960 – 1279 AD), compiled by Li Fang and others, Volume 78 of the book Imperial Readings of the Taiping Era contains a chapter "Customs by Yingshao of the Han Dynasty" in which it is stated that there were no men when the sky and the earth were separated. Thus Nüwa used yellow clay to make people. But the clay was not strong enough so she put ropes into the clay to make the bodies erect. It is also said that she prayed to gods to let her be the goddess of marital affairs. Variations of this story exist.

In Ming dynasty myths about the transition from the Shang dynasty to the Zhou dynasty, Nüwa made evil decisions that ultimately benefited China, such as sending a fox spirit to encourage the debauchery of King Zhou, which led to him being deposed. Other tales have her and Fuxi as exclusively the "great gentle protectors of humanity" unwilling to use subterfuge.

Nüwa and Fuxi were also thought to be gods of silk.

== Iconography of Fuxi and Nüwa ==
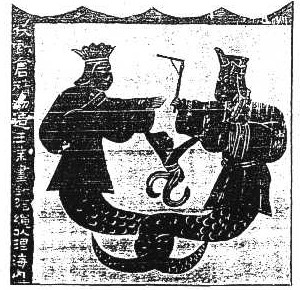
Nüwa and Fuxi on the murals (rubbing depicted) of the Wu Liang shrines, Han dynasty (206 BC – 220 AD)

The iconography of Fuxi and Nüwa vary in physical appearance depending on the time period and also shows regional differences. In Chinese tomb murals and iconography, Fuxi and Nüwa generally have snake-like bodies and human face or head.

Nüwa is often depicted holding a compass or multiple compasses, which were a traditional Chinese symbol of a dome-like sky. She was also thought to be an embodiment of the stars and the sky or a star god.

Fuxi and Nüwa can be depicted as individual figures arranged as a symmetrical pair or they can be depicted in double figures with intertwined snake-like bodies. Their snake-like tails can also be depicted stretching out towards each other.

Fuxi and Nüwa can also appear individually on separate tomb bricks. They generally hold or embrace the sun or moon discs containing the images of a bird (or a three-legged crow) or a toad (sometimes a hare) which are the sun and moon symbolism respectively, and/or each holding a try square or a pair of compasses, or holding a longevity mushroom (靈芝; lingzhi) plant. Fuxi and Nüwa holding the sun and the moon appears as early as the late Western Han dynasty. Other physical appearance variation, such as lower snake-like body shape (e.g. thick vs thin tails), depictions of legs (i.e. legs found along the snake-like body) and wings (e.g. wings with feathers which protrude from their backs as found in late Western Han Xinan (新安) Tomb or smaller quills found on their shoulders), and in hats and hairstyles, also exist.

In the Luoyang regions murals dating to the late Western Han dynasty, Fuxi and Nüwa are generally depicted as individual figures, each one found at each side of the central ridge of tomb chambers as found in the Bu Qianqiu Tomb. They can also be found without intertwining tails from the stone murals of the same period. Since the middle of the Eastern Han dynasty, their tails started to intertwine.

In the Gansu murals dating to the Wei and Western Jin period, one of the most typical features of Fuxi is the "mountain-hat" (山字形; Shanzixing) which looks like a three-peaked cap while Nüwa is depicted wearing various hairstyles characteristic of Han women. Both deities dressed in wide-sleeved clothing, which reflects typical Han clothing style also commonly depicted in Han dynasty art.

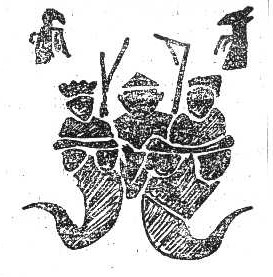
Fuxi and Nüwa

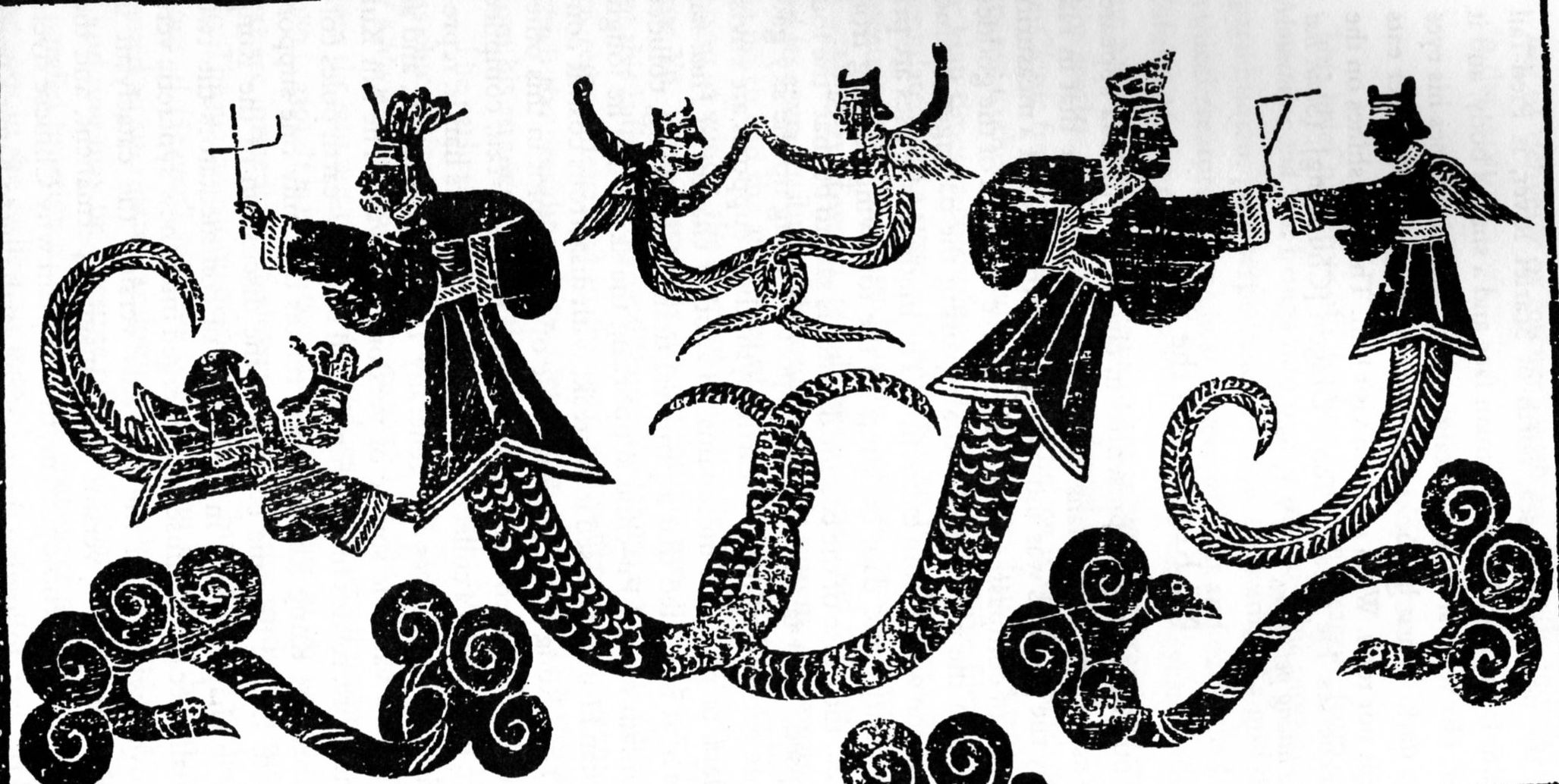

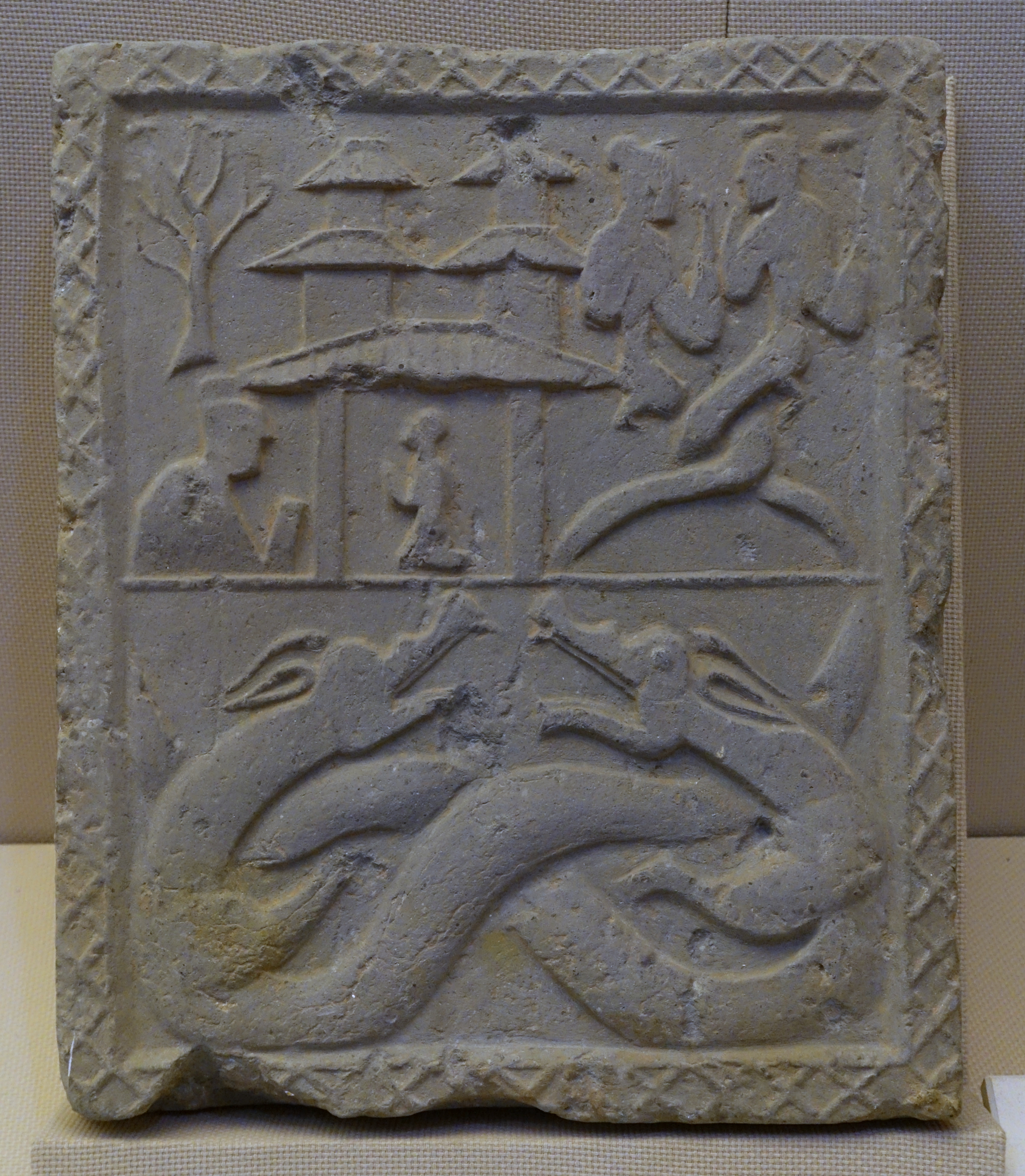
Fuxi and Nüwa with tower and twin dragons, China, unearthed from a cliff tomb, Alkali factory, Pengshan, Eastern Han dynasty, 25–220 AD

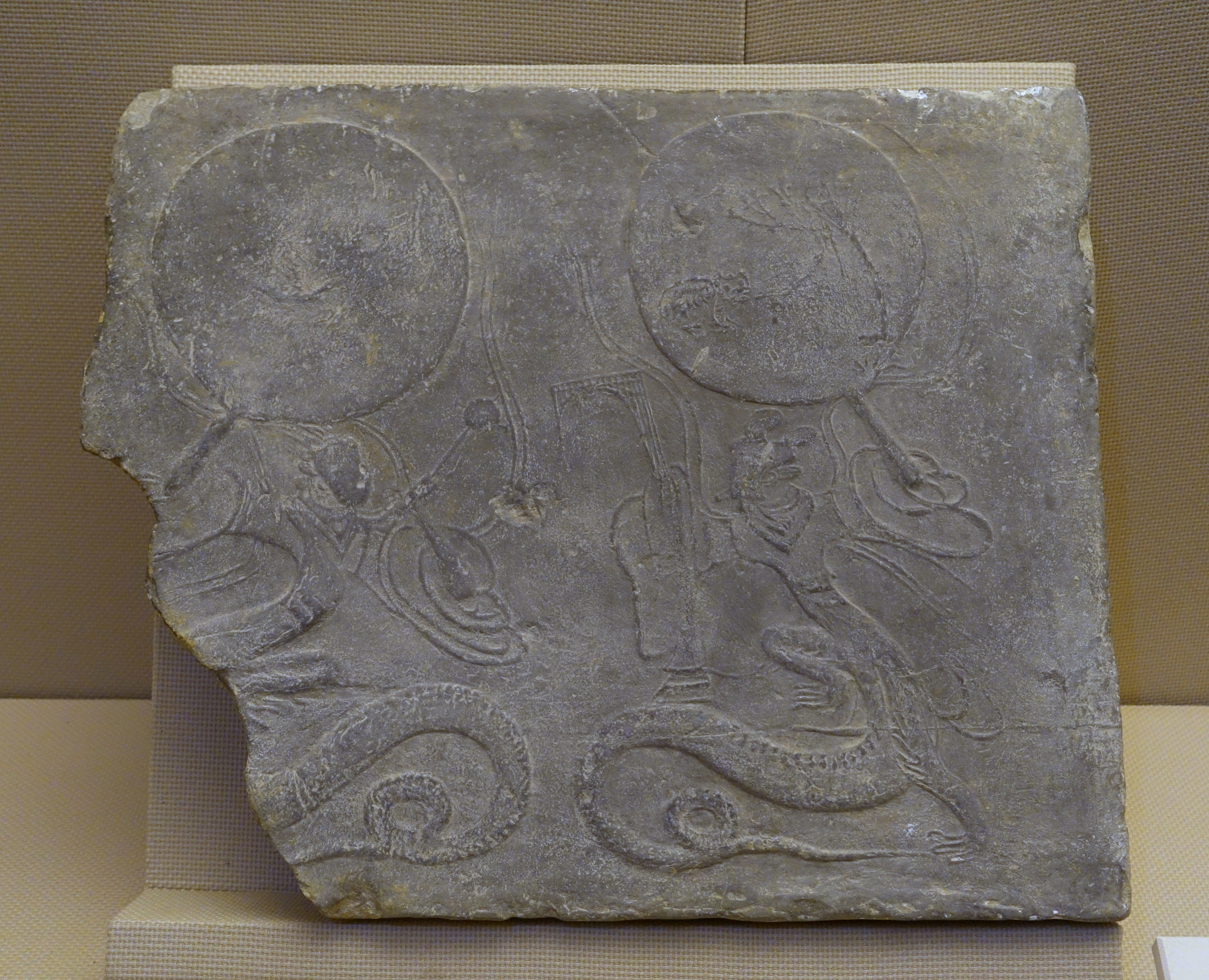
Fuxi and Nüwa holding the sun disc and moon disc respectively, Eastern Han dynasty, 25–220 AD

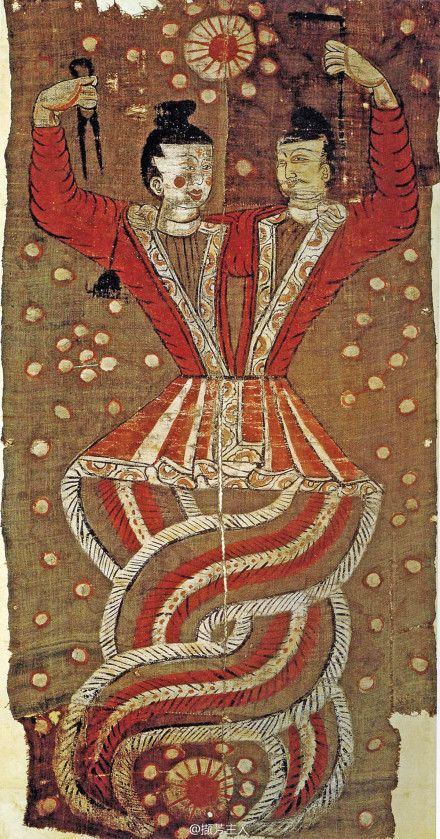
The two conjoined figures are Fuxi and Nüwa holding a compass and a ruler respectively; a painting discovered at the Astana Graves. Burial objects in the Turpan region often display a strong Chinese influence as Chinese Han culture was introduced early in its history.

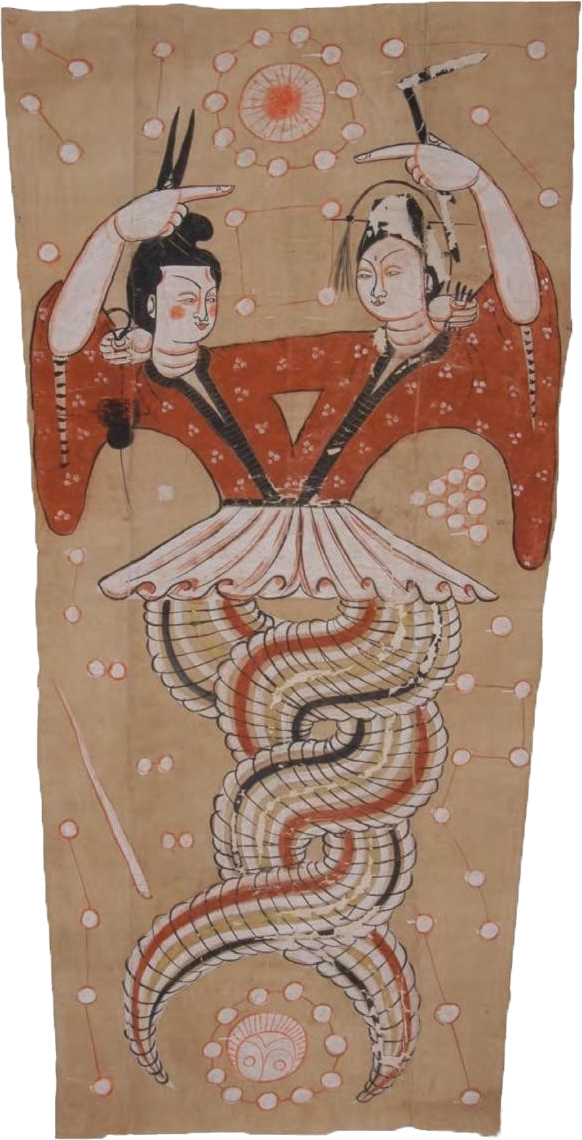
Fuxi and Nüwa, 1967 Astana Cemetery

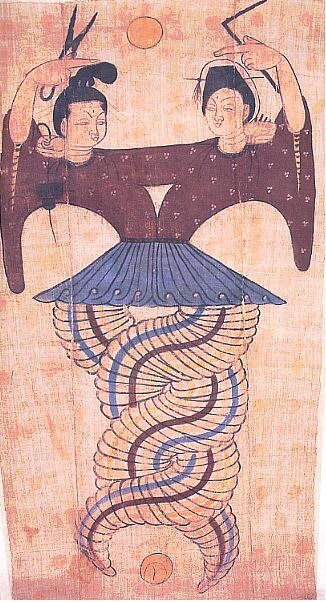

== Legends ==
=== Appearance in Fengshen Yanyi ===
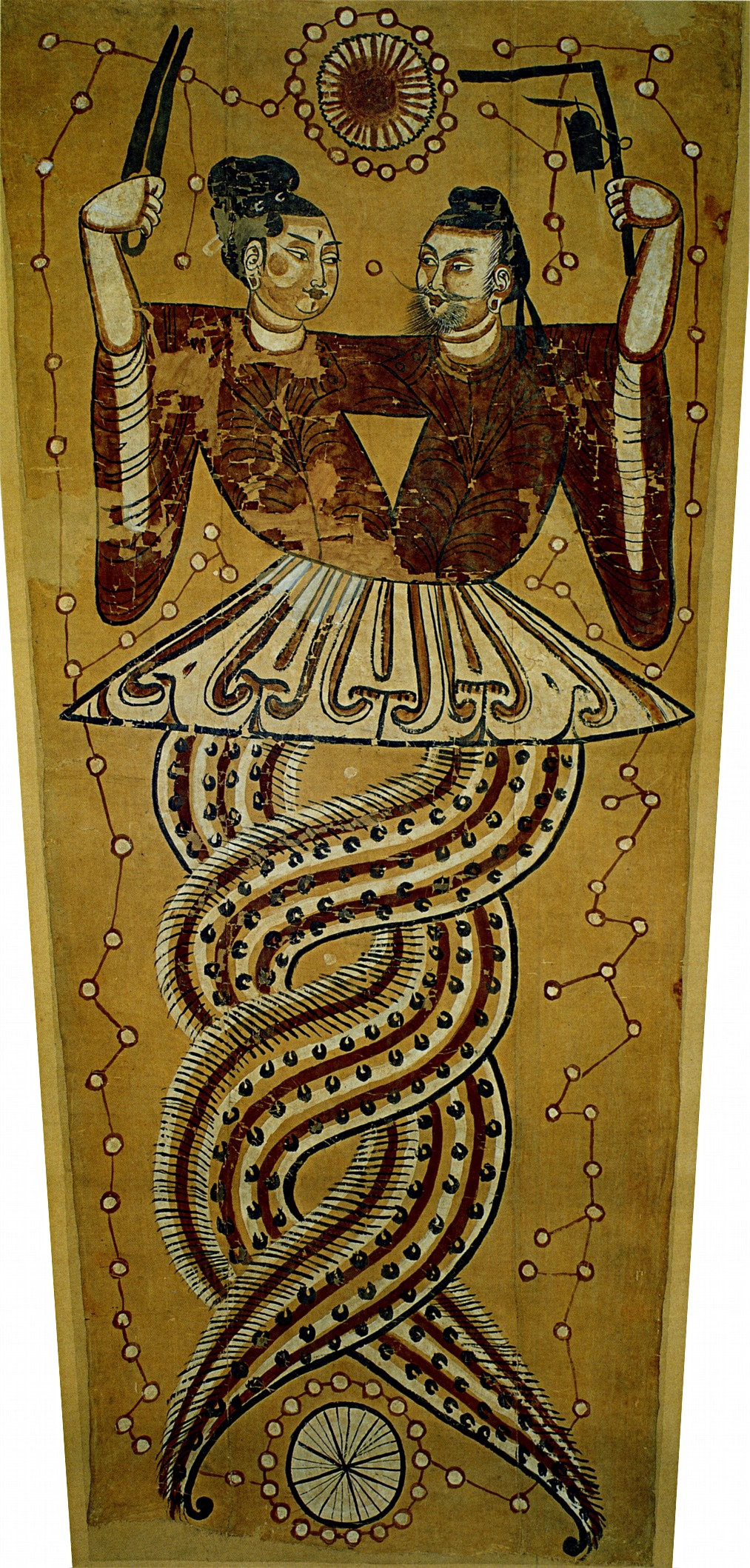
An ancient painting of Nüwa and Fuxi unearthed at the Astana Graves.

Nüwa is featured within the famed Ming dynasty novel Fengshen Bang. As featured within this novel, Nüwa is revered since Xia dynasty for creating the five-colored stones to mend the heavens, which tilted after Gonggong toppled one of the heavenly pillars, Mount Buzhou. Shang Rong asked Di Xin to pay her a visit as a sign of deep respect. Upon seeing her statue, Di Xin was completely overcome with lust at the sight of the beautiful ancient goddess Nüwa. He wrote an erotic poem on a neighboring wall and took his leave. When Nüwa later returned to her temple after visiting the Yellow Emperor, she saw the foulness of Zhou's words. In her anger, she swore that the Shang dynasty would end in payment for his offense. In her rage, Nüwa personally ascended to the palace in an attempt to kill the king, but was suddenly struck back by two large beams of red light.

After Nüwa realized that Di Xin was already destined to rule the kingdom for twenty-six more years, Nüwa summoned her three subordinates—the Thousand-Year Vixen (later becoming Daji), the Jade Pipa, and the Nine-Headed Pheasant. With these words, Nüwa brought destined chaos to the Shang dynasty, "The luck Cheng Tang won six hundred years ago is dimming. I speak to you of a new mandate of heaven which sets the destiny for all. You three are to enter Di Xin's palace, where you are to bewitch him. Whatever you do, do not harm anyone else. If you do my bidding, and do it well, you will be permitted to reincarnate as human beings." With these words, Nüwa was never heard of again, but was still a major indirect factor towards the Shang dynasty's fall.

=== Creation of humanity ===
Pangu provides an origin myth in Chinese mythology. He was a giant sleeping within an egg of chaos. As he awoke, he stood up and divided the sky and the earth. Pangu then died after standing up, and his body turned into rivers, mountains, plants, animals, and everything else in the world, among which is a powerful being known as Huaxu (華胥). Huaxu gave birth to a twin brother and sister, Fuxi and Nüwa. Fuxi and Nüwa are said to be creatures that have faces of human and bodies of snakes.

Nüwa created humanity due to her loneliness, which grew more intense over time. She molded yellow earth or, in other versions, yellow clay into the shape of people. These individuals later became the wealthy nobles of society, because they had been created by Nüwa's own hands. However, the majority of humanity was created when Nüwa dragged string across mud to mass-produce them, which she did because creating every person by hand was too time- and energy-consuming. This creation story gives an aetiological explanation for the social hierarchy in ancient China. The nobility believed that they were more important than the mass-produced majority of humanity, because Nüwa took time to create them, and they had been directly touched by her hand. In another version of the creation of humanity, Nüwa and Fuxi were survivors of a great flood. By the command of the God of the heaven, they were married and Nüwa had a child which was a ball of meat. This ball of meat was cut into small pieces, and the pieces were scattered across the world, which then became humans.

Nüwa was born three months after her brother, Fuxi, whom she later took as her husband; this marriage is the reason why Nüwa is credited with inventing the idea of marriage.

Before the two of them got married, they lived on mount K'un-lun. A prayer was made after the two became guilty of falling for each other. The prayer is as follows,

"Oh Heaven, if Thou wouldst send us forth as man and wife, then make all the misty vapor gather. If not, then make all the misty vapor disperse."

Misty vapor then gathered after the prayer signifying the two could marry. When intimate, the two made a fan out of grass to screen their faces which is why during modern day marriages, the couple hold a fan together. By connecting, the two were representative of Yin and Yang; Fuxi being connected to Yang and masculinity along Nüwa being connected to Yin and femininity. This is further defined with Fuxi receiving a carpenter's square which symbolizes his identification with the physical world because a carpenter's square is associated with straight lines and squares leading to a more straightforward mindset. Meanwhile, Nüwa was given a compass to symbolize her identification with the heavens because a compass is associated with curves and circles leading to a more abstract mindset. With the two being married, it symbolized the union between heaven and Earth. Other versions have Nüwa invent the compass rather than receive it as a gift. In addition, the system of male and female sex, the yang-yin philosophy, is expressed here in a complex way: first as Fuxi and Nüwa, then as a compass (masculine) and a square (feminine), and thirdly, as Nüwa (woman) with a compass (man) and Fuxi (man) with a square (woman).

=== Nüwa Mends the Heavens ===
Nüwa repairing the pillar of heaven, by Xiao Yuncong

"Nüwa Mends the Heavens" (女娲补天; 女媧補天; Nǚwā bǔtiān) is a well-known theme in Chinese culture. The courage and wisdom of Nüwa inspired the ancient Chinese to control nature's elements and has become a favorite subject of Chinese poets, painters, and sculptors, along with so many poetry and arts like novels, films, paintings, and sculptures; e.g. the sculptures that decorate Nanshan and Ya'an.

The Huainanzi tells an ancient story about how the four pillars that support the sky crumbled inexplicably. Other sources have tried to explain the cause, i.e. the battle between Gong Gong and Zhuanxu or Zhurong. Unable to accept his defeat, Gong Gong deliberately banged his head onto Mount Buzhou (不周山) which was one of the four pillars. Half of the sky fell which created a gaping hole and the Earth itself was cracked; the Earth's axis mundi was tilted into the southeast while the sky rose into the northwest. This is said to be the reason why the western region of China is higher than the eastern and that most of its rivers flow towards the southeast. This same explanation is applied to the Sun, Moon, and stars which moved into the northwest. A wildfire burnt the forests and led the wild animals to run amok and attack the innocent peoples, while the water which was coming out from the earth's crack didn't seem to be slowing down.

Nüwa pitied the humans she had made and attempted to repair the sky. She gathered five colored-stones (red, yellow, blue, black, and white) from the riverbed, melted them and used them to patch up the sky: since then the sky (clouds) have been colorful. She then killed a giant turtle (or tortoise), some version named the tortoise as Ao, cut off the four legs of the creature to use as new pillars to support the sky. But Nüwa didn't do it perfectly because the unequal length of the legs made the sky tilt. After the job was done, Nüwa drove away the wild animals, extinguished the fire, and controlled the flood with a huge amount of ashes from the burning reeds and the world became as peaceful as it was before.

=== Empress Nüwa ===
Many Chinese know well their Three Sovereigns and Five Emperors, i.e. the early leaders of humanity as well as culture heroes according to the Northern Chinese belief. But the lists vary and depend on the sources used. One version includes Nüwa as one of the Three Sovereigns, who reigned after Fuxi and before Shennong.

The myth of the Three Sovereigns sees the three as demigod figures, and the myth is used to stress the importance of an imperial reign. The variation between sources stems from China being generally divided before the Qin and Han dynasties, and the version with Fuxi, Shennong, and Nüwa was used to emphasize rule and structure.

In her matriarchal reign, she battled against a neighboring tribal chief, defeated him, and took him to the peak of a mountain. Defeated by a woman, the chief felt ashamed to be alive and banged his head on the heavenly bamboo to kill himself and for revenge. His act tore a hole in the sky and made a flood hit the whole world. The flood killed all people except Nüwa and her army which was protected by her divinity. After that, Nüwa patched the sky with five colored-stones until the flood receded.

== Popular culture ==
- The Ming dynasty fantasy novel Investiture of the Gods (1567) has Nüwa being an instigator of the Shang dynasty's collapse, as she sent the fox demon Daji to corrupt King Zhou for the latter verbally desecrating her statue at a temple.
- The Qing dynasty novel Dream of the Red Chamber (1754) narrates how Nüwa gathered 36,501 stones to patch the sky but left one unused. The unused stone plays an important role in the novel's storyline.
- A goddess Nüwa statue named Sky Patching by Yuan Xikun was exhibited at Times Square, New York City, on 19 April 2012 to celebrate Earth Day (2012), symbolized the importance of protecting the ozone layer. Previously, this 3.9-meter-tall (13 ft) statue was exhibited on Beijing and now is placed on Vienna International Centre, Vienna since 21 November 2012.
- The story of Nüwa patching the sky was being retold by Carol Chen in her book Goddess Nuwa Patches Up the Sky (2014) which was illustrated by Meng Xianlong.
- In Shin Megami Tensei 5, Nuwa (voiced by Ayana Taketatsu) is the partner to Shohei Yakumo (voiced by Tomokazu Sugita) as two of the main characters who aid the protagonist.
- In the Gremlins animated series, Nuwa (voiced by Sandra Oh) is portrayed as the creator of the Mogwai species that Gizmo originated from and fell into a depression when the humans could not properly coexist with them.
- The 2024 metroidvania Nine Sols features two antagonists inspired by Nuwa and Fuxi. The pair sit on the eponymous council of Sols, and fight together in a late-game boss encounter. Later flashbacks and audio logs imply they were in an incestuous relationship.
- The goddess appears as a playable character in the Chinese pantheon in the 2014 multiplayer online battle arena Smite.

== General bibliography ==
- Birrell, Anne (1993), Chinese Mythology: An Introduction, Baltimore: Johns Hopkins University Press.
- Lewis, Mark Edward (2006), The Flood Myths of Early China, Albany: State University of New York Press, ISBN 978-0-7914-6663-6.
- Major, John S.; et al., eds. (2010), The Huainanzi: A Guide to the Theory and Practice of Government in Early Han China, New York: Columbia University Press, ISBN 978-0-231-14204-5.

Nüwa Three Sovereigns and Five Emperors
Regnal titles
Preceded by Fuxi	Sovereign of China	Succeeded by Shennong
