= Huaxu =

Chinese goddess and ruler

Huaxu (Chinese: 華胥; pinyin: Huáxū) is a Chinese goddess and mother of the gods Nüwa and Fuxi.

== Legend ==
According to legend, the creation god Pangu died after standing up, and his body turned into rivers, mountains, plants, animals, and everything else in the world, among which was a powerful being known as Huaxu. Huaxu suddenly became pregnant with twins Fuxi and Nüwa after stepping in a footprint left by the thunder god, Lei Shen. They are said to be creatures that have faces of human and bodies of snakes.

Legends of the later Yellow Emperor state that, during a period of fasting, the emperor dreamed of Huaxu's mythical kingdom, "beyond the reach of ship or chariot or any mortal foot...only the soul could travel so far." The residents of this heavenly place "rode space as though walking the solid earth, and slept on the air as though on their beds...mountains and valleys did not trip their feet, for they made only journeys of the spirit." This specific legend is from the second chapter of the taoist book Liezi, and the chengyu huaxuzhimeng(華胥之夢) originated from the legend.

== Mentions ==
A number of Chinese and East Asian sources used the figure as a metaphor for the divine intervention or the Golden Age. In the chapter about King Jeongjo in the Veritable Records of the Joseon Dynasty, one of the officials uses the figure of Huaxu as a metaphor. Meng Yuanlao, a Northern Song dynasty writer, says in his prologue that he named his book "Dongjing Meng Hua Lu (東京夢華錄)" after the dream of Huaxu related to the aforementioned Yellow Emperor legend. The legend of the dream of Huaxu is also mentioned in the book Shijia Shipu (釋迦氏譜) by Tang Buddhist monk Daoxuan as cited in the Korean Buddhist compilation book Sŏkposangjŏl. Korean novelist Chae Man-sik used Hwaseo as his early pen name, named after the figure.
