= Standing on My Sisters' Shoulders =

Documentary film

Standing on My Sisters' Shoulders is a 2002 documentary film from the United States about civil rights activists from Mississippi. The film combines archival footage, photographs, and interviews. John Hinshaw stated the documentary "is an important documentary on the civil rights movement in Mississippi and the female leaders and rank-and-file activists". The film was written, directed, and produced by Laura J. Lipson with Joan A. Sadoff as co-producer.

The film documents the civil rights campaigning of Victoria Gray Adams, Unita Blackwell, Mae Bertha Carter, Annie Devine, Fannie Lou Hamer and others. The film is 1-hour long.

The film was screened in the 2012 BAAD! Ass Women Festival held by the Bronx Academy of Arts & Dance.
