= Yuan Xikun =

Chinese sculptor (born 1944)

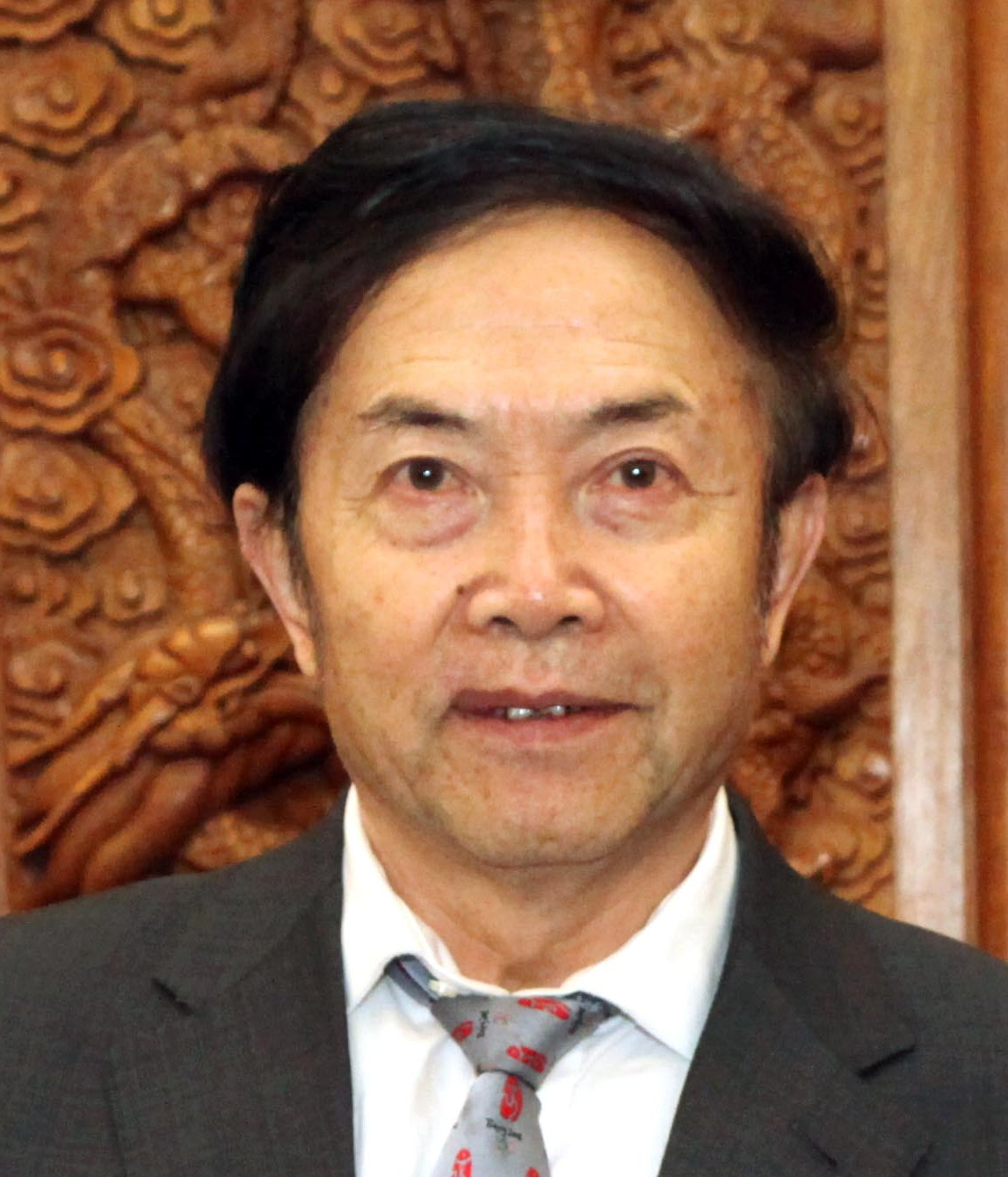
Yuan Xikun

Yuan Xikun (born 1944 in Kunming, Yunnan Province) is a Chinese visual artist and environmental activist. In 2011, Yuan proposed building a giant sculpture composed of sand collected from five of Earth's continents and water from its Arctic and Antarctic regions to draw attention to ozone depletion and climate change.

Yuan served on the Standing Committee of the All-China Youth Federation and was a member of the 11th Standing Committee of Chinese People's Political Consultative Conference. Yuan serves as the honorary president of the Sino-American Friendship Association.

== Awards and decorations ==
- Top Philanthropist & Cultural Award (2006)
- UNEP Patron for the Arts Environment (2010)
- May Day Labor Honor Medal (2011)
- Order of Merit, 3rd social class (Ukraine, 2008)
