= Unita Blackwell =

American civil rights activist (1933–2019)

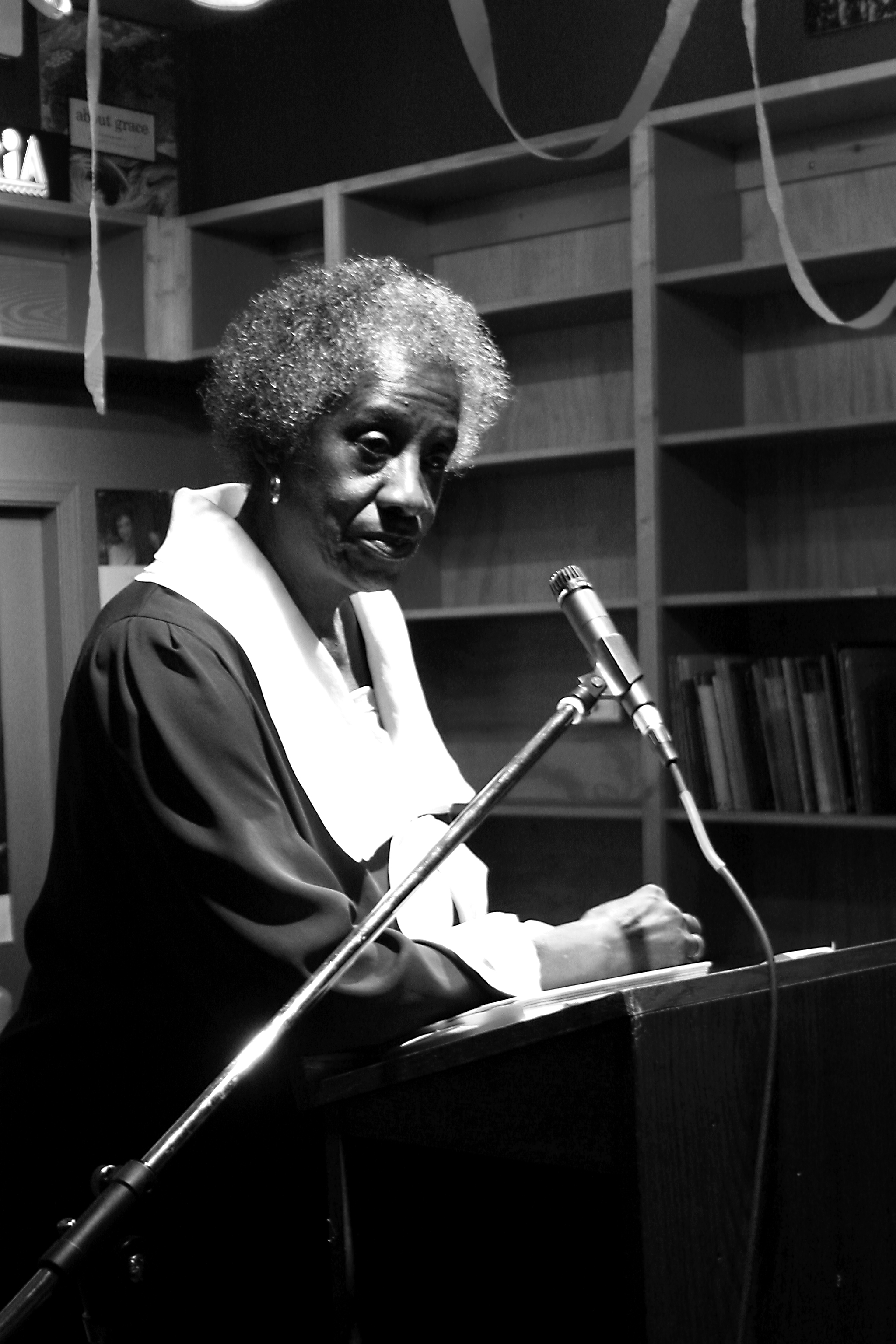

Mayor of Mayersville, Mississippi
- In office 1976–2001

Personal details
- Born: U. Z. Brown; March 18, 1933 Lula, Mississippi, U.S.
- Died: May 13, 2019 (aged 86) Biloxi, Mississippi, U.S.
- Party: Democratic
- Spouse(s): Jeremiah Blackwell; Willie Wright
- Children: 1
- Education: University of Massachusetts Amherst (MRP)
- Occupation: Activist

Unita Zelma Blackwell (March 18, 1933 – May 13, 2019) was an American civil rights activist who was the first African-American woman to be elected mayor in the U.S. state of Mississippi. Blackwell was a project director for the Student Nonviolent Coordinating Committee (SNCC) and helped organize voter drives for African Americans across Mississippi. She was also a leader of the US–China Peoples Friendship Association, a group dedicated to promoting cultural exchange between the United States and China. She also served as an advisor to six US presidents: Lyndon Johnson, Richard Nixon, Gerald Ford, Jimmy Carter, Ronald Reagan, and Bill Clinton.

Barefootin', Blackwell's autobiography, published in 2006, charts her activism.

== Early life ==
Blackwell was born U. Z. Brown on March 18, 1933, in Lula, Mississippi, to sharecroppers Virda Mae and Willie Brown. Blackwell's uncle gave her the name "U. Z.", which she kept until she was in the sixth grade, when her teacher told her that she needed "a real name, not just initials". Blackwell and her teacher decided on Unita Zelma.

Blackwell and her parents lived in Lula. Her grandfather had been murdered by a white plantation boss. In 1936, when she was three years old, Blackwell's father left the plantation on which he worked and fled to Memphis, Tennessee, fearing for his life after he confronted his boss about speaking to his wife. Blackwell and her mother left the plantation to live with him soon afterward. Blackwell's family traveled frequently in search of work. On June 20, 1938, Blackwell's parents separated due to religious differences. Blackwell and her mother went to West Helena, Arkansas, to live with Blackwell's great aunt so that she could have access to a better education. A quality education in Mississippi was not an option for Blackwell because the schools there were centered on the cultivation of crops and the plantation system. Black children were allowed to attend school for only two months at a time, before they were expected to go back to the cotton fields. While living in West Helena, Blackwell often visited her father in Memphis. During the summer months she would leave West Helena and live with her grandfather and grandmother in Lula, where she helped plant and harvest cotton. Blackwell spent a majority of her early years chopping cotton for $3 a day, in Mississippi, Arkansas, and Tennessee as well as peeling tomatoes in Florida. She was 14 when she finished the eighth grade, the final year of school at Westside, a school in West Helena for black children. Blackwell had to quit school to earn for her family.

=== Marriage and move ===
She was 25 when she first met Jeremiah Blackwell, a cook for the U.S. Army Corps of Engineers. A few years later, they traveled to Clarksdale, Mississippi, and were married by a justice of the peace.

In January 1957, Blackwell became extremely ill and was taken to the hospital in West Helena where she was pronounced dead. She was later found to be alive in her hospital room, and claims to have had a near-death experience. On July 2, 1957, the couple's only son, Jeremiah Blackwell Jr. (Jerry), was born. In 1960, Jeremiah's grandmother, "Miss Vashti", died. A few months later, the Blackwells moved into the shotgun house that his grandmother had left to him, in Mayersville, Mississippi, a town of nearly five hundred people. The Blackwell family eventually was able to build a larger brick home, but she wanted to keep the smaller house inherited from Jeremiah's grandmother.

I am grateful for this house ... I kept it because it reminded me of where I came from.

— Unita Blackwell

After settling in Mayersville, Blackwell began to get involved in the Civil Rights Movement.

== Civil rights activism ==
=== Voting discrimination ===
Blackwell first got involved in the Civil Rights Movement in June 1964, when two activists from the Student Nonviolent Coordinating Committee came to Mayersville and, in the church she belonged to, held meetings concerning the rights of African Americans to vote. The following week she and seven others went to the courthouse to take a voter registration test so that they could vote. While they were outside the courthouse waiting to take the test, a group of white farmers from the area heard what was happening and tried to scare them off. Her group stayed there all day, but only two of them were able to take the test. The racism that they experienced, Blackwell says, made that day "the turning point" of her life. Jeremiah and Unita lost their jobs the next day after their employer found out that they had been part of the group seeking to register to vote. After losing her job, Blackwell recounts her family's means of survival:

We had a garden; people would give us a pot of beans... SNCC was supposed to send us eleven dollars every two weeks. My husband worked three months of the year for the Army Corps of Engineers, then we'd buy lots of canned goods

— Unita Blackwell

Blackwell attempted to pass the voter registration test three times over the next few months. In early fall she took the test successfully and became a registered voter.

When the United States Commission on Civil Rights came to Mississippi in January 1965, Blackwell testified in front of them about her experiences with voter discrimination:

I filled it out and I had section 97 and I wrote it down and looked it over and I picked some of the words out of, you know, what I had wrote down; put that in there and turned it over. And I misspelled 'length' and I said 'Oh, my Lord.' And so then I filled out the rest of it and when I got through I handed it to her, and I said 'Well, I misspelled this, and well, I didn't date the top,' and she said 'Oh, that's all right, it's all right, it's all right.' And then she ran and got the book and [registered me].

— Unita Blackwell

As a result of Blackwell's involvement with voter registration campaigns, she and other activists endured constant harassment.

=== SNCC and other movements ===
External videos
- “Interview with Unita Blackwell” conducted in 1986 for the Eyes on the Prize documentary in which she discusses her decision to join the civil rights movement in the 1960s, Student Non-violent Coordinating Committee and National Association for the Advancement of Colored People activism in Mississippi, the Mississippi Freedom Democratic Party, and the 1964 Democratic National Convention.

After meeting Fannie Lou Hamer in the summer of 1964 and hearing her experiences in the Civil Rights Movement, Blackwell decided to join the SNCC. As a project director for the SNCC, she organized voter registration drives across Mississippi. Later that year, she became a member on the executive committee of the Mississippi Freedom Democratic Party (MFDP), which provided a party for voters that SNCC had been registering to vote. In late August she and 67 other elected MFDP delegates traveled to the 1964 Democratic National Convention in Atlantic City, New Jersey, intending to get the MFDP seated as "the only democratically constituted delegation from Mississippi". They were eventually offered two at-large seats but refused that compromise; the event, particularly Hamer's nationally televised testimony before the credentialing committee, brought the party and the Mississippi civil rights movement into the public eye.

Blackwell was involved in the introduction of Head Start for black children in 1965 in the Mississippi Delta, a project led by Child Development Group of Mississippi.

In the late 1960s Blackwell worked as a community development specialist with the National Council of Negro Women. In the 1970s, through the National Council of Negro Women, she worked on a development program for low-income housing and encouraged people across the country "to build their own homes". During her time participating in the Civil Rights Movement, she was jailed more than 70 times because of her role in civil rights protests and other acts against oppression.

=== Blackwell v. Issaquena County Board of Education ===
The SNCC pin

The Blackwells filed a suit, Blackwell v. Issaquena County Board of Education, against the Issaquena County Board of Education on April 1, 1965, after the principal suspended more than 300 black children—including Jerry, the Blackwells' son—for wearing pins that depicted a black hand and a white hand clasped with the word "SNCC" below them. The suit covered several issues including the students' use of the "freedom pins", and asked that the Issaquena County School District desegregate their schools per the Supreme Court ruling in Brown v. Board of Education. The United States District Court for the Southern District of Mississippi decided that the students were being disruptive with their use of the freedom pins, but directed that the school district had to desegregate their schools to comply with federal law, by the fall of 1965. The case was taken to the United States Court of Appeals for the Fifth Circuit in July 1966, where the previous decision by the District Court was upheld. Due to the case resulting in a desegregation plan, Blackwell referred to it as "one of the very first desegregation cases in Mississippi".

Blackwell's son and approximately 50 other children boycotted the school, because of its decision to not let the children wear the SNCC freedom pins. As a result, Blackwell and some other activists in the community decided that it was vital to educate those children. She helped open Freedom Schools in Issaquena County to resolve the issue. The schools became popular and continued to teach classes every summer until 1970, when the local schools finally desegregated.

== Political career and later life ==
Starting in 1973, Blackwell participated in 16 diplomatic trips to China, including a trip with actress Shirley MacLaine in 1973 to film The Other Half of the Sky. As part of her commitment to better relations between the United States and China, Blackwell served for six years as president of the US–China Peoples Friendship Association, an association dedicated to promoting cultural exchange between the United States and China. In 1979 Blackwell was appointed to the U.S. National Commission on the International Year of the Child.

She was elected mayor of Mayersville, Mississippi, in 1976 and held this office until 2001, making her the first female African-American mayor in Mississippi. As mayor, she oversaw the construction of several sets of public housing, the first time that federal housing had been built in Issaquena County. Blackwell obtained federal grant money that provided Mayersville with police and fire protection, a public water system, paved streets, housing accommodations for the elderly and disabled, and other infrastructure. She gained national attention by traveling across the country to promote the construction of low-income housing.

Blackwell also served on the Democratic National Committee and as co-chairman of the Mississippi Democratic Party. The Mississippi Freedom Democratic Party sent Blackwell and 67 other delegates to the 1964 Democratic National Convention in New Jersey. Their voices at the convention helped contribute to the passage of the Civil Rights Act of 1964 and the Voting Rights Act of 1965. In late 1982, Blackwell went to the University of Massachusetts-Amherst and received a Master of Regional Planning. Although Blackwell did not attend high school, the National Rural Fellows Program helped her gain admittance to the University of Massachusetts by awarding her a scholarship and providing her credit based on her activism and life experience.

As part of her community development efforts, she helped found Mississippi Action for Community Education (MACE), a community-development organization in Greenville, Mississippi. From 1990 to 1992, Blackwell was president of the National Conference of Black Mayors. In 1991, she co-founded the Black Women Mayors' Conference as a corollary to the National Conference of Black Mayors and served as its first president.

Blackwell became a voice for rural housing and development and, in 1979, President Jimmy Carter invited her to an energy summit at Camp David. Blackwell also was awarded a $350,000 MacArthur Fellowship genius grant in 1992, for her part in creating the Deer River housing development among other creative solutions to housing and infrastructure problems in her state. Blackwell ran for Congress in 1993, but she was defeated by Bennie Thompson in the primary.

Blackwell, with help from JoAnne Prichard Morris, wrote an autobiography, Barefootin': Life Lessons from the Road to Freedom, that covers her life, the sharecropper work she and her parents experienced, being elected mayor of Mayersville, which caused her rise from "Poverty to Power", and her actions in the Civil Rights Movement. It was published in 2006.

=== Health and death ===
In January 2008, Blackwell disappeared from her hotel in Atlanta while attending commemoration ceremonies for Martin Luther King Jr. Later, she was found at Hartsfield-Jackson International Airport. She was subsequently reported as having been in the early stages of dementia. In 2014, it was reported that Blackwell lived in a nursing home on the Mississippi Gulf Coast.

Blackwell died at a hospital in Ocean Springs, Mississippi on May 13, 2019, from heart and lung ailments and complications of dementia, as reported by her son Jeremiah Blackwell Jr. Her survivors include her son, Jeremiah Jr., two grandchildren, two step grandchildren, and eight step great-grandchildren.

== Personal life ==
Blackwell married twice, first to Jeremiah Blackwell, from whom she was later divorced. Her second marriage, to Willie Wright, also ended in divorce. She had one son.

== Honors and awards ==
- Named as fellow of the Institute of Politics at the John F. Kennedy School of Government at Harvard University
- Received master's degree from the University of Massachusetts in 1983 through the National Rural Fellows program
- Won the MacArthur Foundation Genius Grant in 1992
- Recipient of an honorary doctor of law from the University of Massachusetts in 1995
- The University of Massachusetts recognized Blackwell's abilities and philosophy of life-"to educate by doing and being"
- Recipient of the For My People Award, presented by Jackson State University

=== Tributes ===
- Blackwell is featured in Standing on My Sisters' Shoulders, a movie about the experiences of the women behind the civil rights movement in Mississippi.

== See also ==
- List of first African-American mayors

== Bibliography ==
- Blackwell, Unita; Prichard Morris, JoAnne (2006). Barefootin': Life Lessons from the Road to Freedom. New York City, New York: Crown Publishers. ISBN 0-609-61060-0.

== Sources ==
- Crawford, Vicki; Jacqueline Anne Rouse; Barbara Woods (1993). Women in the Civil Rights Movement: Trailblazers and Torchbearers, 1941–1965. Indiana University Press. ISBN 0-253-20832-7.
- Engelbert, Phillis; Diane M. Sawinski (2000). Activists, Rebels, and Reformers: A – F. U·X·L. ISBN 0-7876-4848-5.
- Hampton, Henry; Steve Fayer (1990). Voices of Freedom. New York, NY: Bantam Books. ISBN 0-553-05734-0.
- Haskins, James (1999). Eleanor Holmes Norton (ed.). Distinguished African American Political and Governmental Leaders. Phoenix: Oryx Press. pp. 16. ISBN 1-57356-126-6.
- Klopfer, Susan; Fred Klopfer (2005). Where Rebels Roost ... Mississippi Civil Rights Revisited. Lulu. ISBN 1-4116-4102-7.
- Morrison, Minion K. C. (1987). Black Political Mobilization: Leadership, Power, and Mass Behavior. SUNY Press. ISBN 0-88706-515-5.
- Schwartz, Robert J. (2002). Can You Make A Difference?: A Memoir of a Life for Change. New York, NY: Lantern Books. ISBN 1-59056-032-9.
- Sewell, George A.; Margaret L. Dwight (1984). Mississippi Black History Makers. Univ. Press of Mississippi. ISBN 1-60473-390-X.
- Williams, Juan (1987). Eyes on the Prize: America's Civil Rights Years (1954–1965). New York, NY: Viking Penguin. ISBN 0-670-81412-1.
