= Duyizhi =

Duyizhi (Chinese: 獨異志, also known as Tu yi chih), a book in the genre of "transmissions of strange tales" (chuanqi), is now known only in partial form. The author has been identified as Li Rong. The book is a very important source for the modern study of Chinese mythology, containing many versions of otherwise lost narratives; such as the traditional story of Nüwa who mends the Heavens. The title (Duyizhi) has various translations into English, including Treatise on Extraordinary and Strange Things (Birrell 1993, 34); and, in Wade-Giles transliteration, as Tu yi chih (Birrell 1993, 272). Of the original ten volumes of the Duyizhi, only three volumes survive.

== Author ==
Although sometimes known as Li Rong (Chinese: 李冗; Wade–Giles: Li Jung), due to lack of biographic data, there are various versions of his name or names, the truth of which is unclear. Other names given are Li Yin (李尢), Li Yuan (李元), and Li Kang (李亢). He flourished around 846 to 874 CE (Birrell 1993, 34), or the regnal periods of the two late Tang emperors Xuānzōng (846 – 859) and Yìzōng (859 to 873).

== See also ==
- Chinese mythology
- Nüwa
