= US–China Peoples Friendship Association =

Nonprofit people-to-people diplomacy organization

- Abbreviation: USCPFA
- Formation: 1974; 52 years ago
- Tax ID no.: 74-2191266
- Key people: Diana Greer, President
- Website: www.uscpfa.org

The US–China Peoples Friendship Association (USCPFA) is a nonprofit educational organization whose stated aim is to develop and strengthen people-to-people diplomacy between the United States and the People's Republic of China. According to its website, the group "organizes and conducts educational tours to China, often in conjunction with its continuing exchange with the Chinese People's Association for Friendship with Foreign Countries (CPAFFC)."

== History ==
USCPFA was founded as a national organization in 1974. Its founding convention was held at the University of California in Los Angeles, with speakers including authors David Crook and Han Suyin. The first National Chairman was William Hinton, author of Fanshen. During Hinton's tenure, the USCPFA arranged about 24 tours each year to China.

Hinton was later succeeded as Chairman of the USCPFA by California attorney Frank Pestana and by Mississippi civil rights activist Unita Blackwell. Notable members of the National Steering Committee included Koji Ariyoshi, a veteran of the World War II Dixie Mission to Yenan and founder of the Hawaii-China Friendship Association, and New York activists Helen V. Rosen and Esther Gollobin. The Koji Ariyoshi Award, established after his death in 1976, is the organization's highest honor. In the years after Nixon's opening to China and before full diplomatic relations were established under President Jimmy Carter, it became the main way that ordinary Americans could visit the People's Republic of China, through its extensive tour program. National policies are established by the membership, which meets biennially at a national convention. A national board of directors implements national policy and meets twice each year.

Starting in the 1970s, the national association or regional chapters published the journal New China and short books and pamphlets such as Debbie Davison, Mark Selden, William Hinton, Chou En-Lai and the Chinese Revolution / Conversations with Americans: Interviews (Los Angeles: US–China Peoples Friendship Association, 1977), Hugh Deane Remembering Koji Ariyoshi: An American GI in Yenan, and China and Us (New York: U.S.-China Peoples Friendship Association). Diana Greer is the current president of USCPFA. Barbara Harrison served as the organization's president from 1991 to 2005.

Although the organization publicly states that it is non-political, its website states, "We recognize that friendship between our two peoples must be based on the knowledge of and respect for the sovereignty of each country; therefore, we respect the declaration by the United States of America and the People's Republic of China that the resolution of the status of Taiwan is the internal affair of the Chinese on both sides of the Taiwan Straits."

== See also ==
- Chinese People's Association for Friendship with Foreign Countries
- Sino-American Friendship Association
- One-China policy
