= Shuilu ritual paintings =

Style of traditional Chinese paintings

The Eight Hosts of Deva, Naga, and Yakshi, Ming dynasty

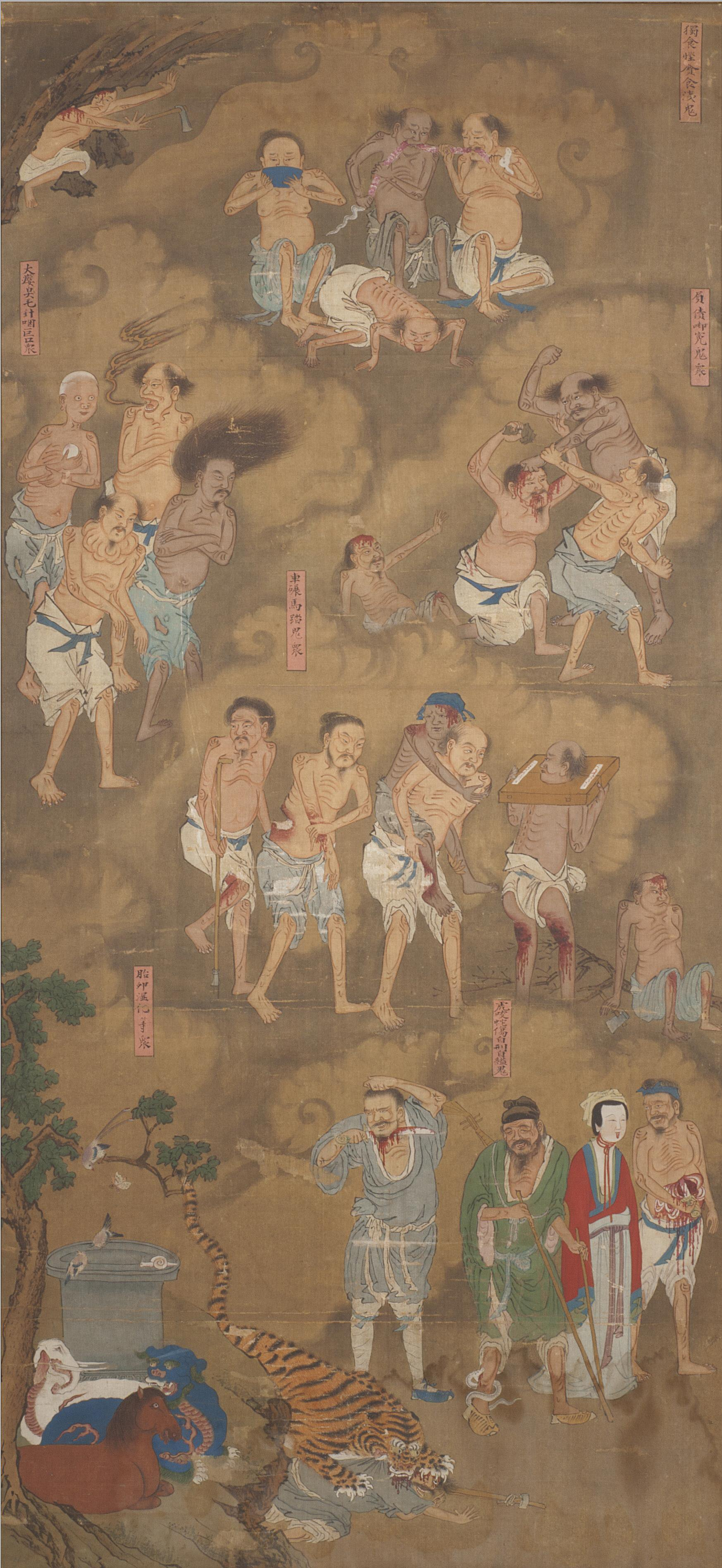
Ghostly Realm, Qing dynasty

Shuilu ritual paintings (Chinese: 水陸畫; pinyin: Shuǐlù huà; lit. 'Paintings of Water and Land') are a style of traditional Chinese painting based on Buddhist and Taoist divinities that are used during the eponymous Chinese Buddhist Shuilu Fahui ceremony where these figures are invoked. The paintings are mainly intricate portraits of deities, historical figures, and the contrasting lives of common people and tragedies, in an ornate style with rich use of vivid colors and patterns. The paintings can encompass a wide range of mediums, including scroll-painting, murals, and even sculptures.

Despite their often mythological subject matter, the parts of the Shuilu ritual paintings that are dedicated to commoners show a realistic, often downtrodden and tragic view of their everyday lives, as part of the ritual to reflect on the suffering of the deceased. The paintings preserve the intricacies of their respective eras' fashions and give a greater view of their cultural and spiritual landscape. The visual similarities in the portraits between the divine figures and traditional Chinese opera costumes also illuminate the mutual inspiration between the two art forms.

The history of Shuilu ritual paintings can be traced back to the Three Kingdoms period, with other early mentions during the late Tang dynasty, and became popular during the Yuan, Ming and Qing dynasties as a part of the Buddhist Shuilu Fahui ritual to appease and enshrine spirits of the deceased. While the painting style has its origins in Buddhist ritual, the paintings also include Taoist and Ruist figures as reflections of local folk-religious culture. Many of the best-preserved paintings are from the Ming and Qing dynasties, particularly in Shanxi and Hebei.

In modern contemporary Chinese Buddhist practice, newly created Shuilu ritual paintings as well as prints of historical paintings are still used during the Shuilu Fahui ceremony and other related rituals to invoke and enshrine the divinities depicted.

== Gallery ==
Examples
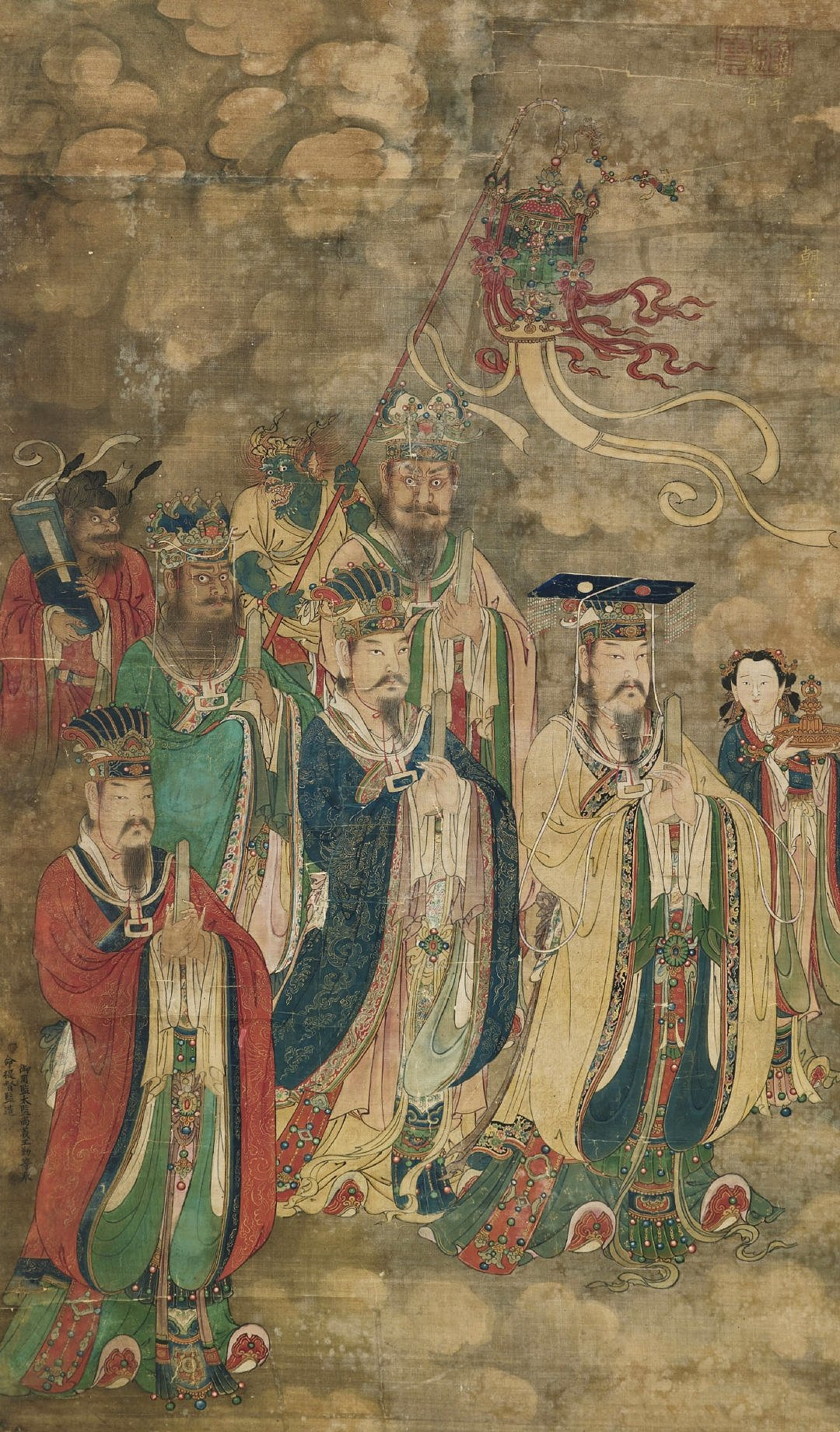
Celestial Emperor and attendants, Ming Dynasty.

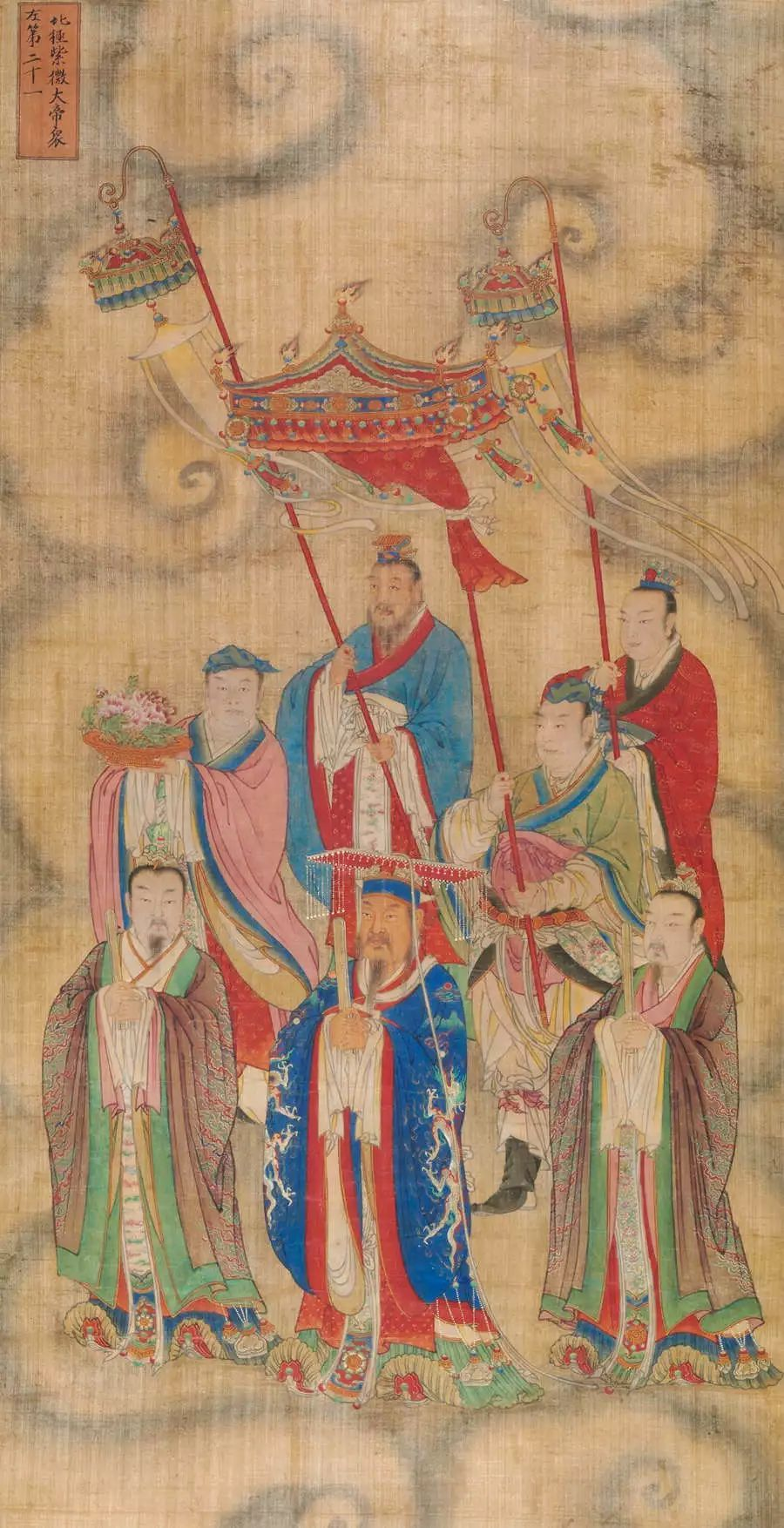
Great Emperor of the North Star, Baoning Temple, Ming Dynasty.

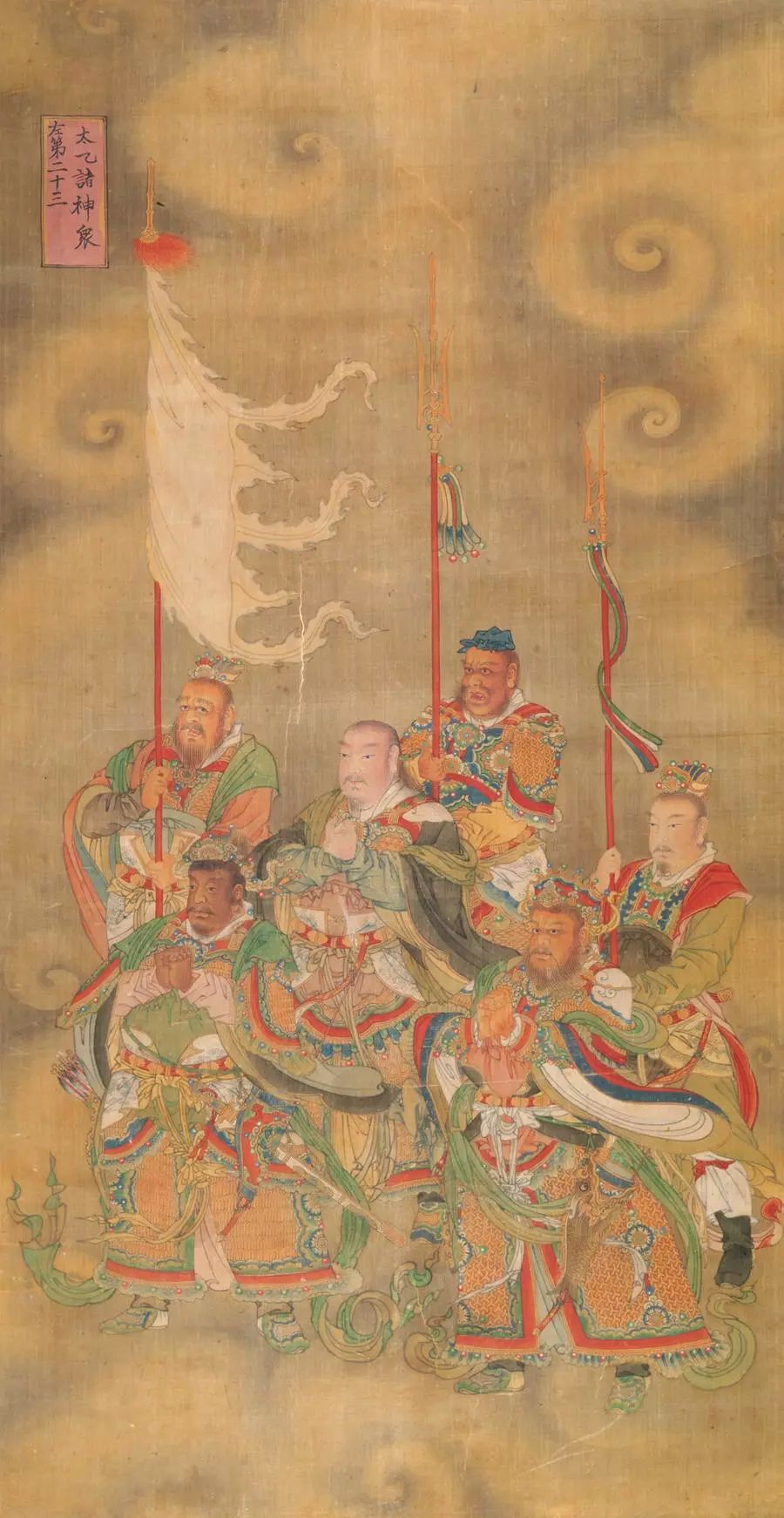
Taiyi gods, Baoning Temple, Ming Dynasty.

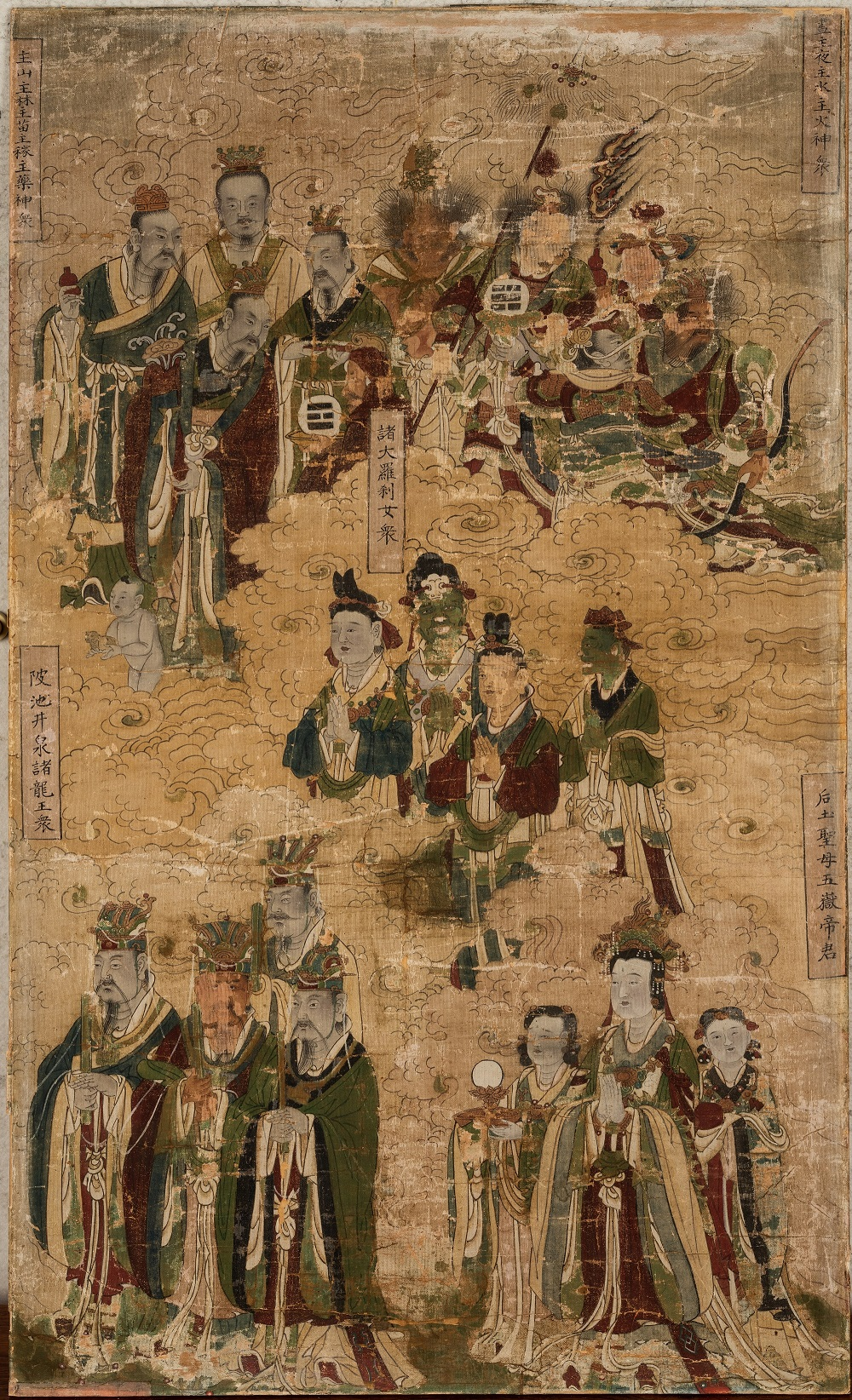
Celestial deities, Ming Dynasty

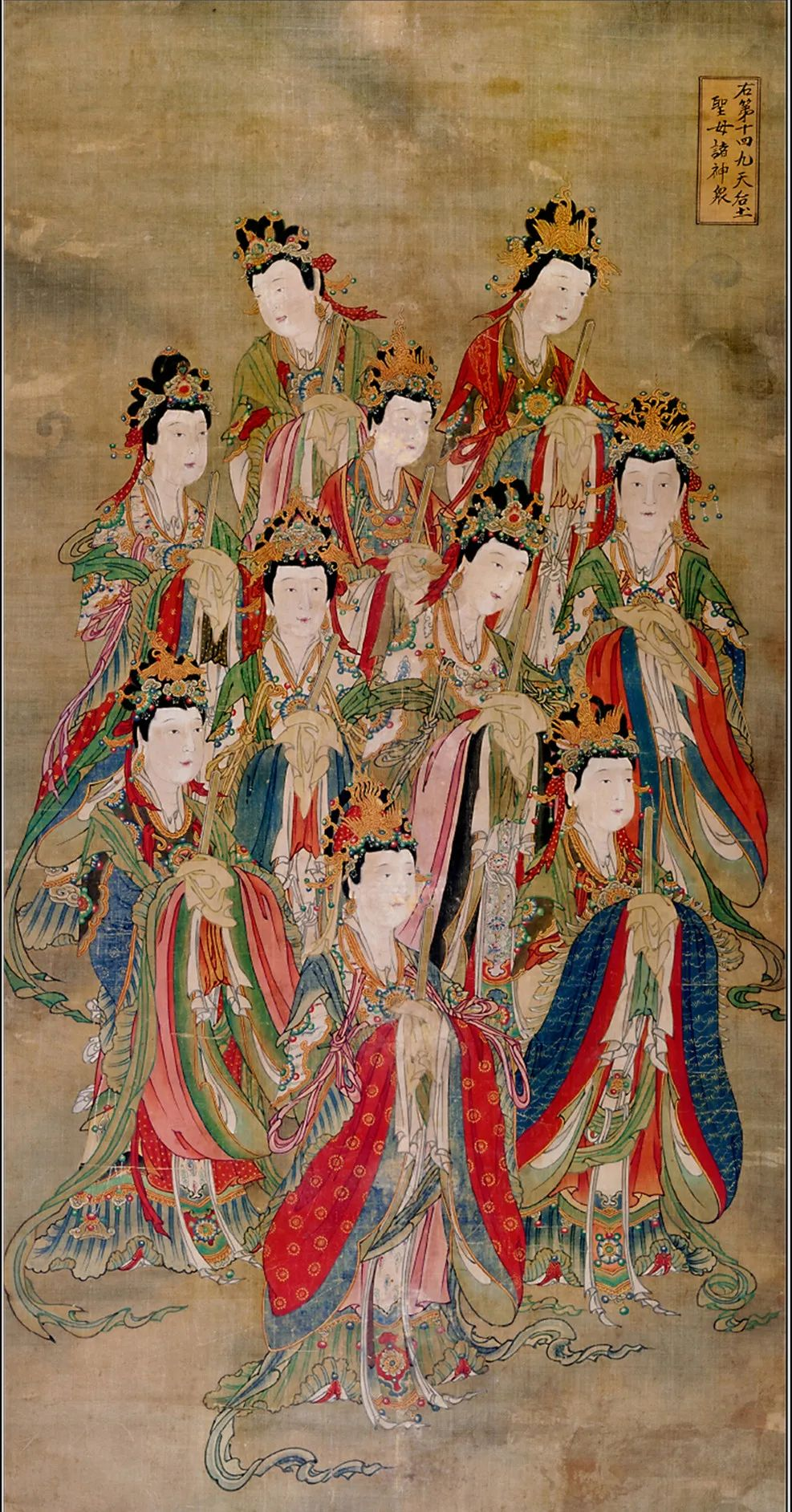
Jiutian, Houtu and Shengmu, Baoning Temple, Ming Dynasty.

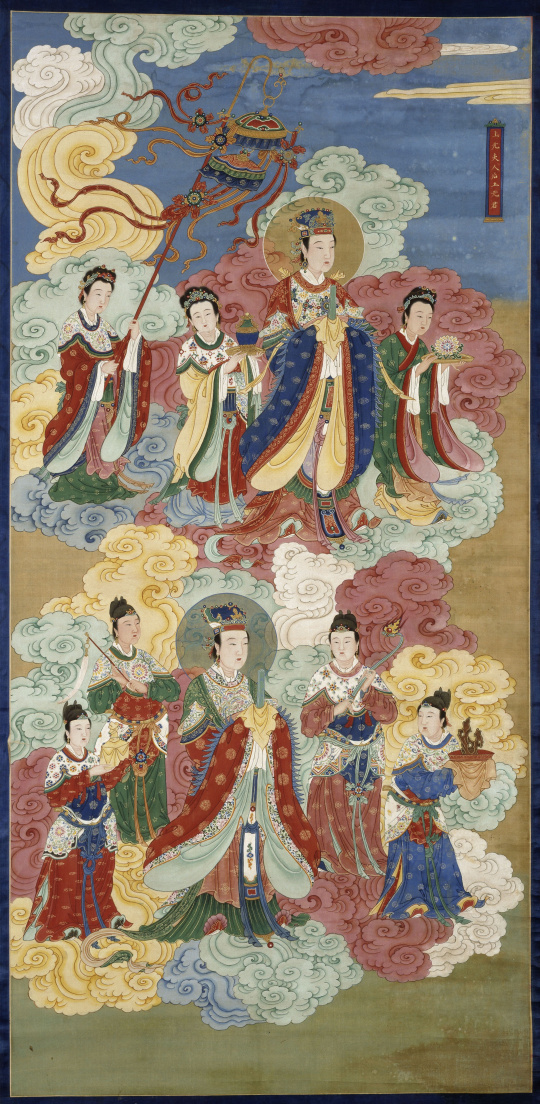
Shangyuan furen and Houtu

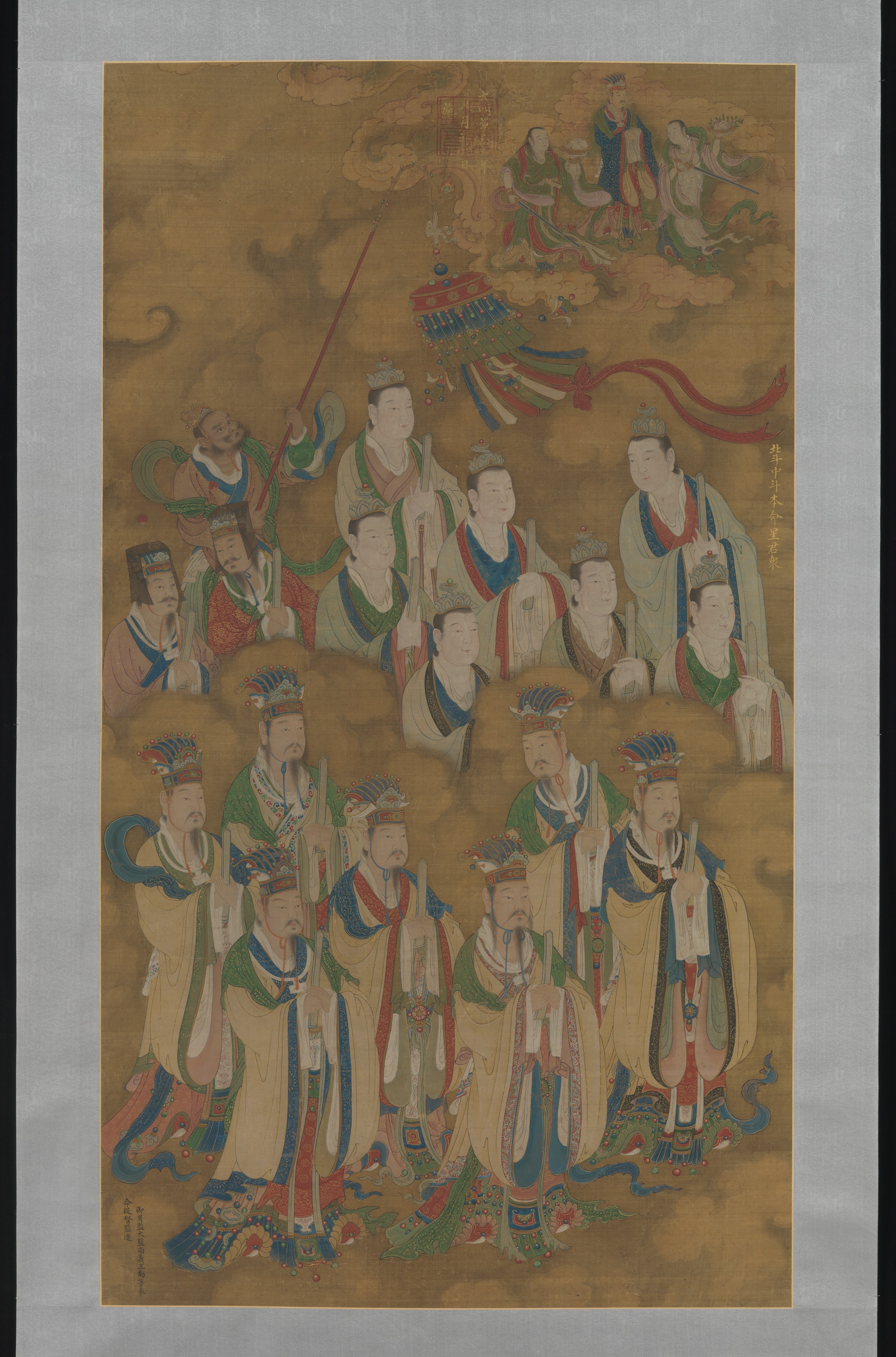
Star deities of the northern and central dippers, Ming dynasty

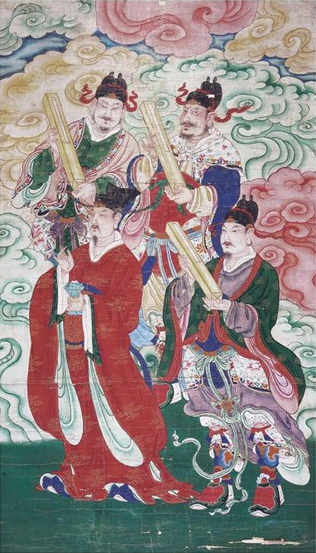
Four Time Guardians (四值功曹)

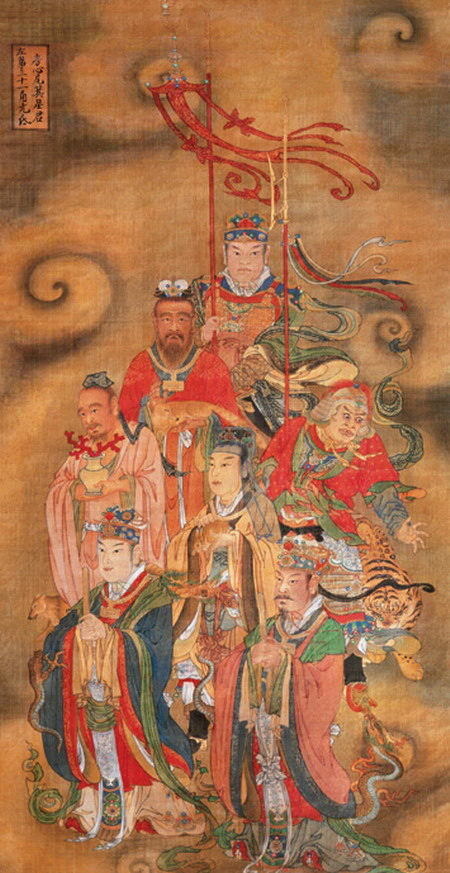
Twenty-Eight Mansions (Azure Dragon), Baoning Temple, Ming Dynasty.

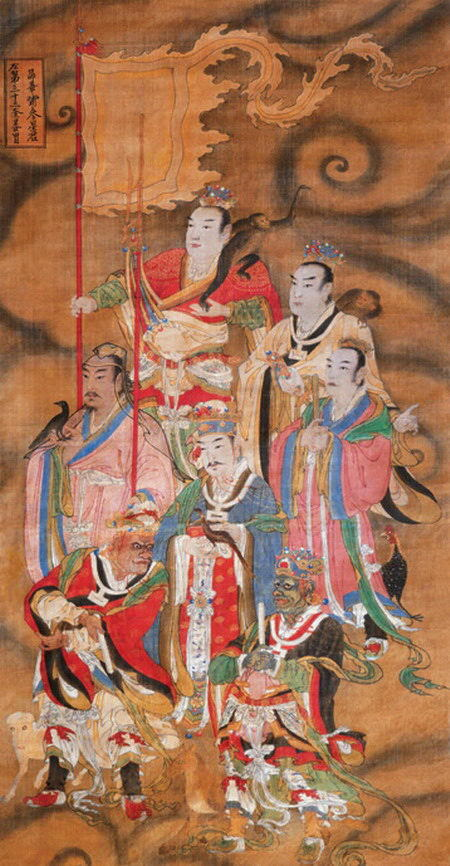
Twenty-Eight Mansions (White Tiger), Baoning Temple, Ming Dynasty.

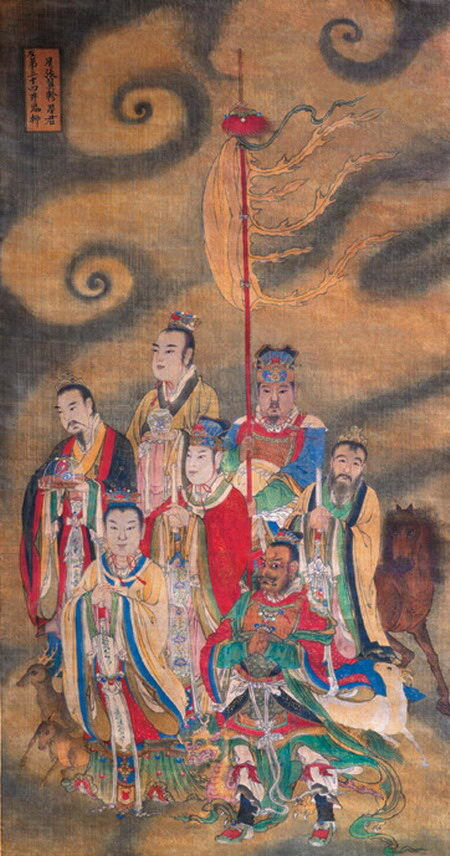
Twenty-Eight Mansions (Vermillion Bird), Baoning Temple, Ming Dynasty.

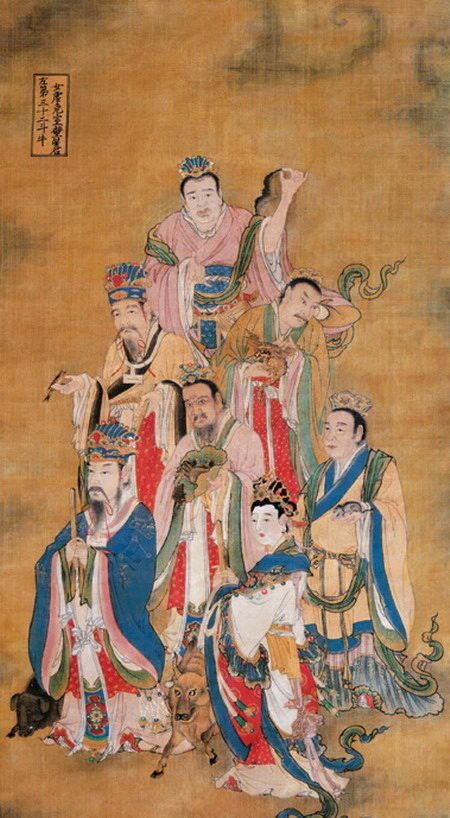
Twenty-Eight Mansions (Black Tortoise), Baoning Temple, Ming Dynasty.

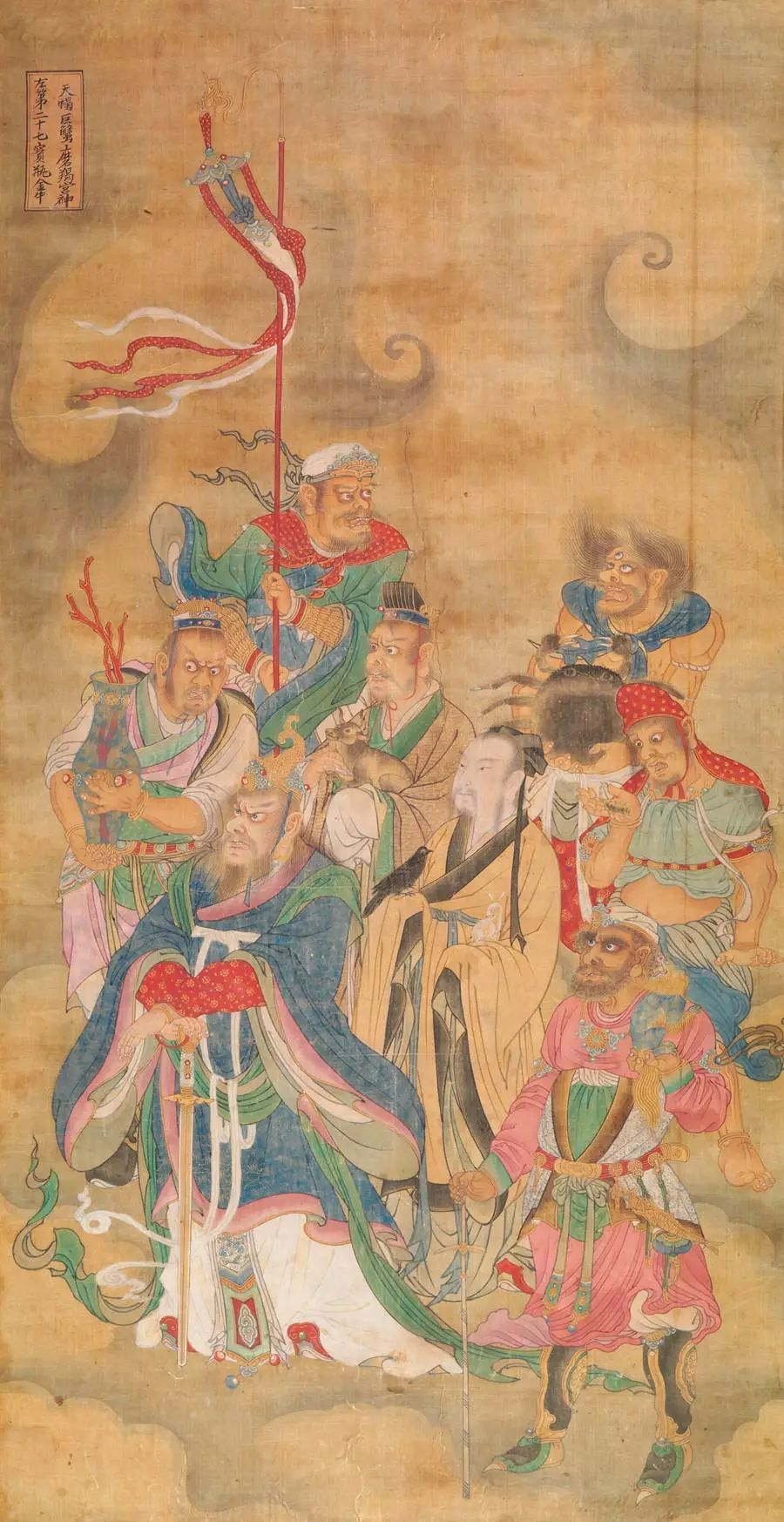
Five of the Chinese constellations, Baoning Temple, Ming Dynasty.

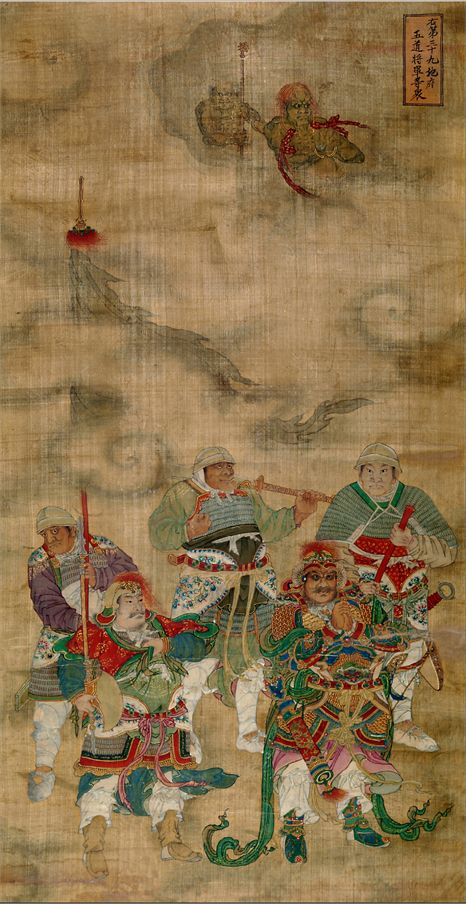
Generals of the Five Paths, Baoning Temple, Ming Dynasty

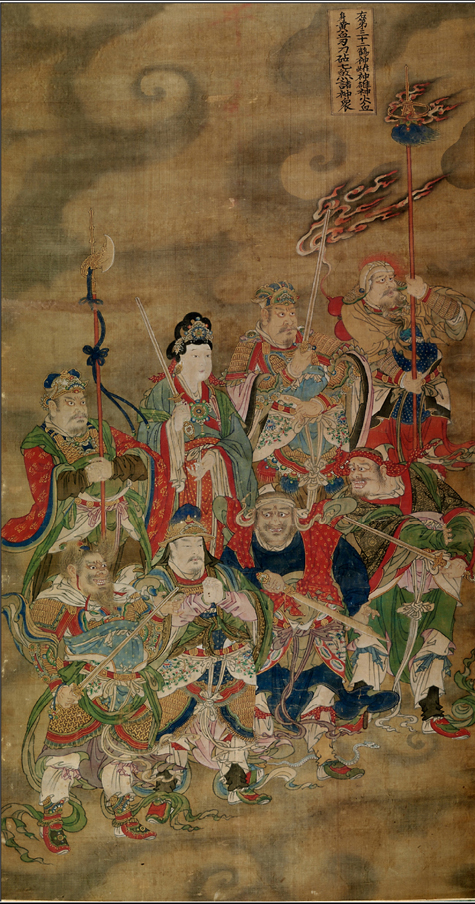
A Portrait of Eight Gods, Baoning Temple, Ming Dynasty.

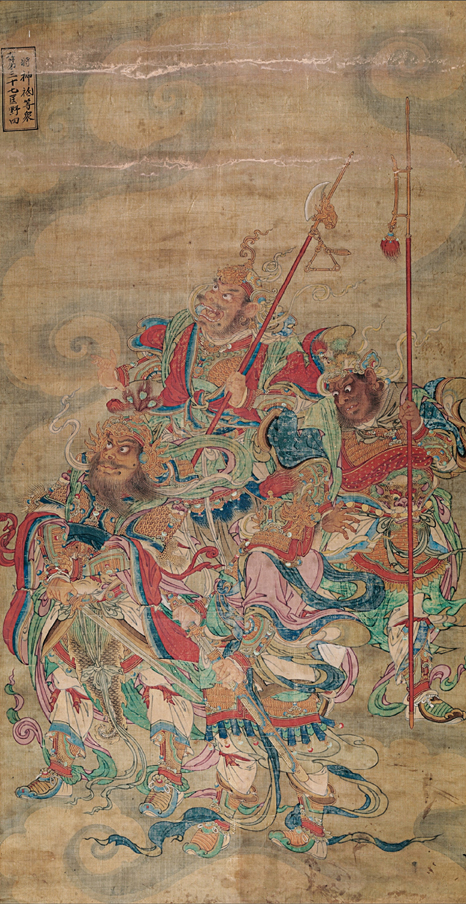
Guardians of the North, South, West and East, Baoning Temple, Ming Dynasty.

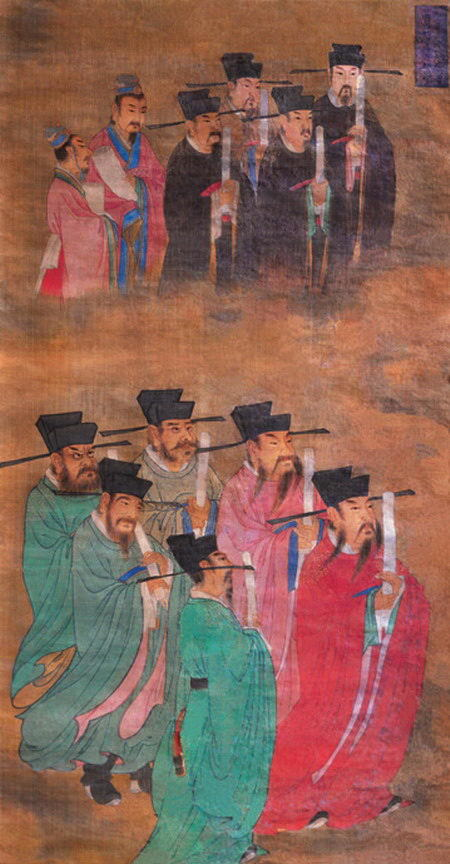
Officials and judges of the Earthly Court, Ming dynasty

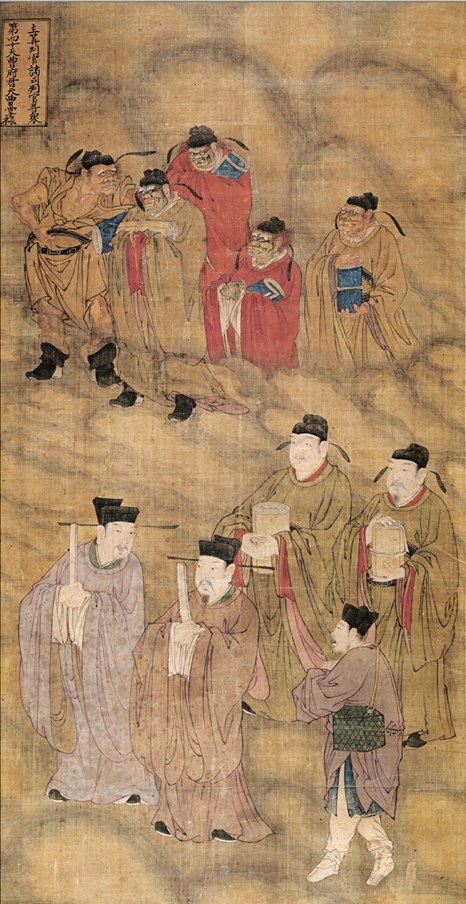
Officials of the Earthly Court, Ming Dynasty

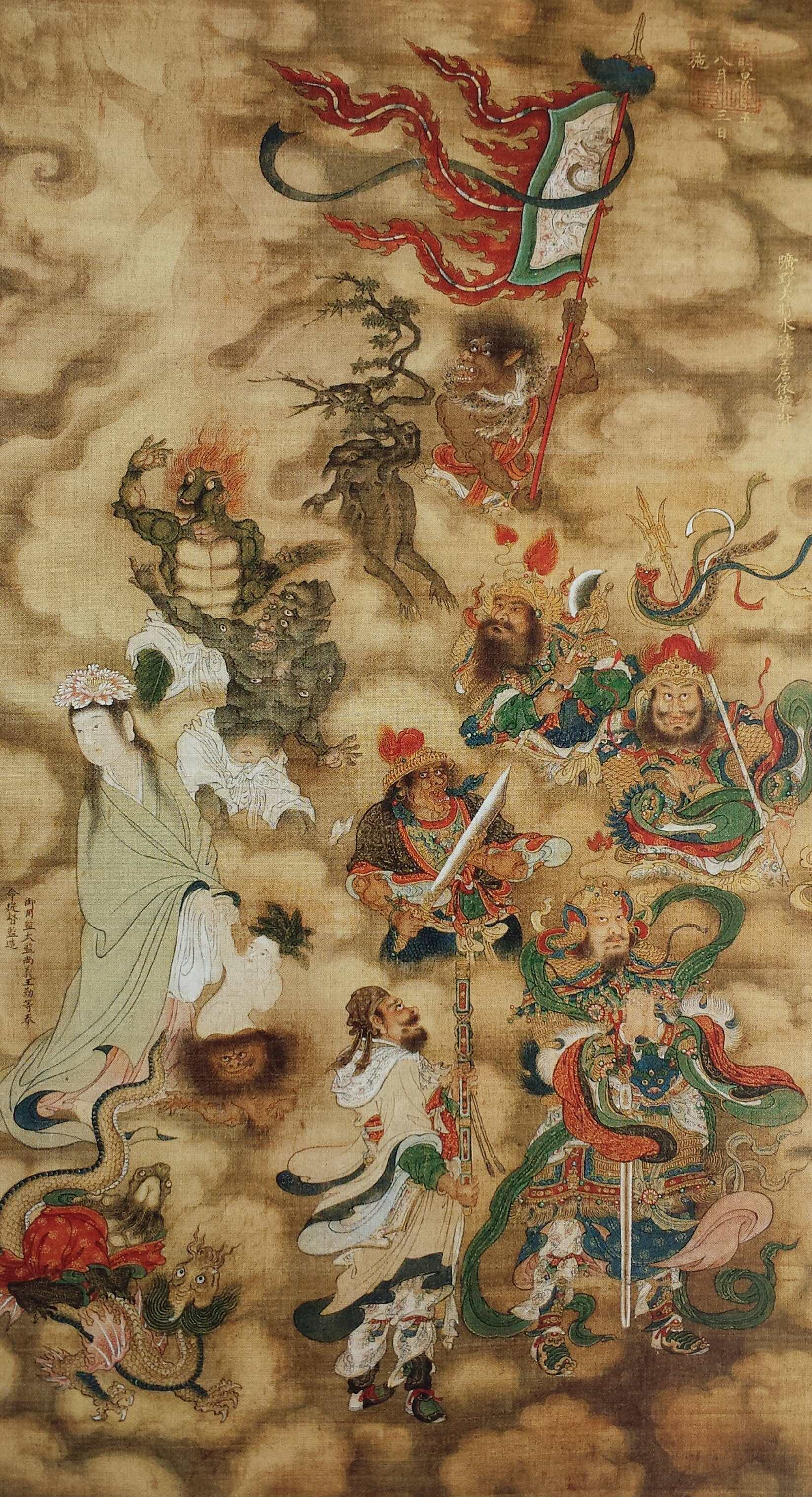
Great Generals of the Desert and the Spirits of Grasses and Trees Who Dwell in the Void of Water and Land, Ming dynasty

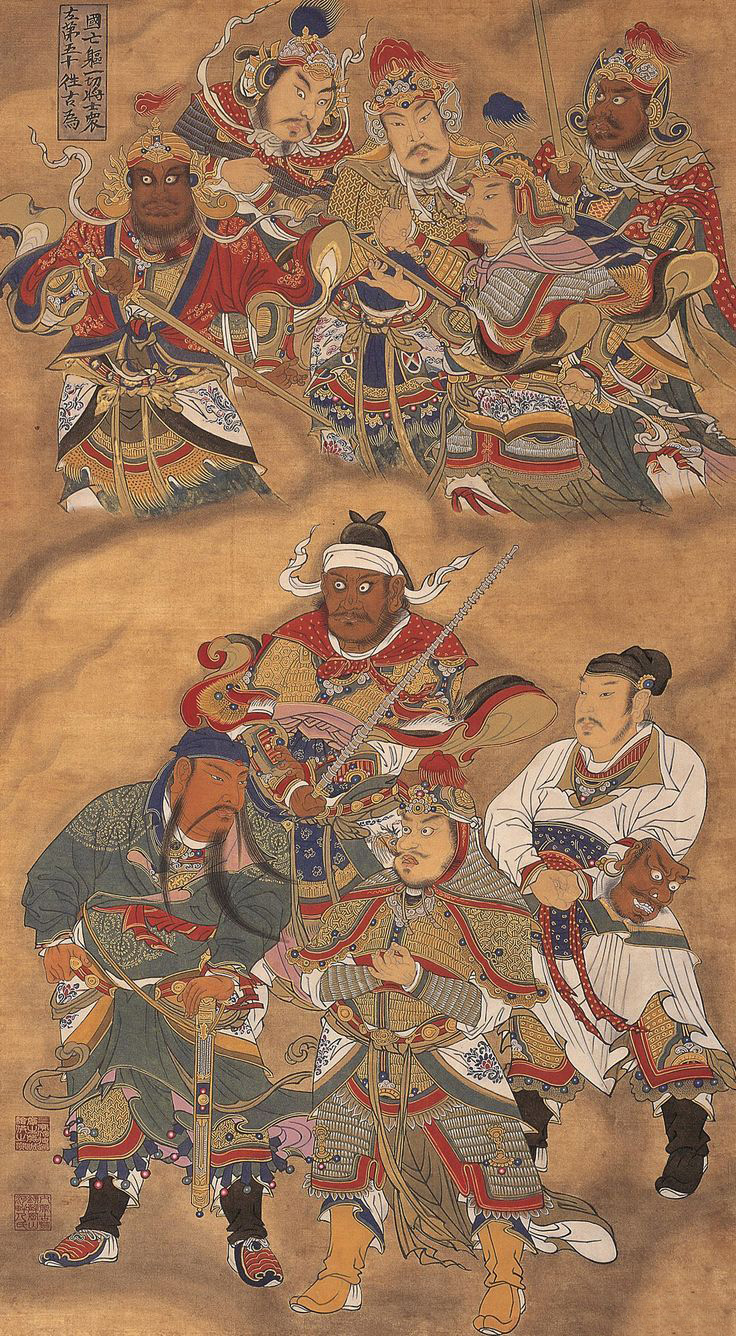
Martyred generals and officials, Baoning Temple, Ming Dynasty.

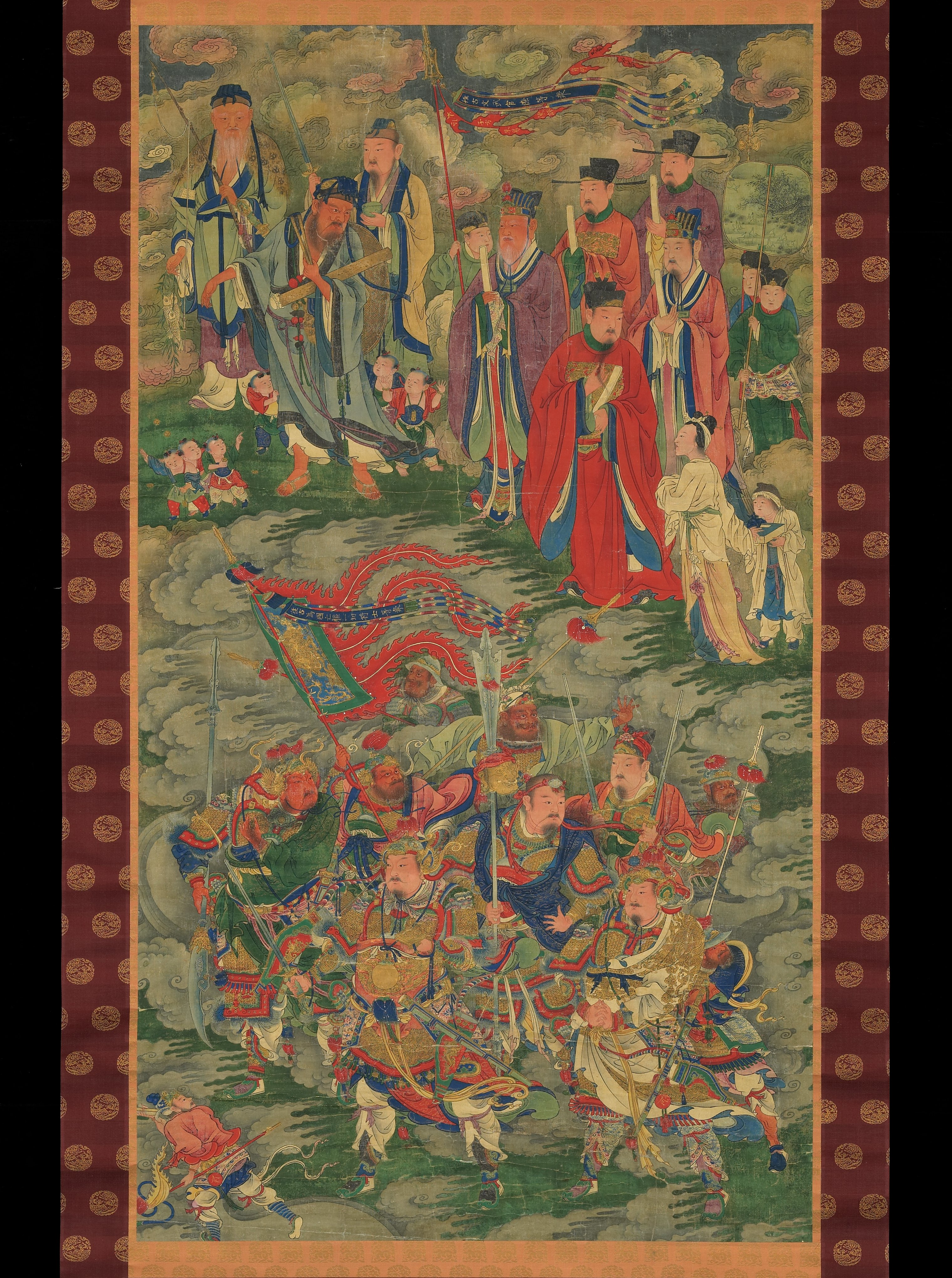
Martyred Generals Who Died for their Country and Officials of Former Times, Ming dynasty

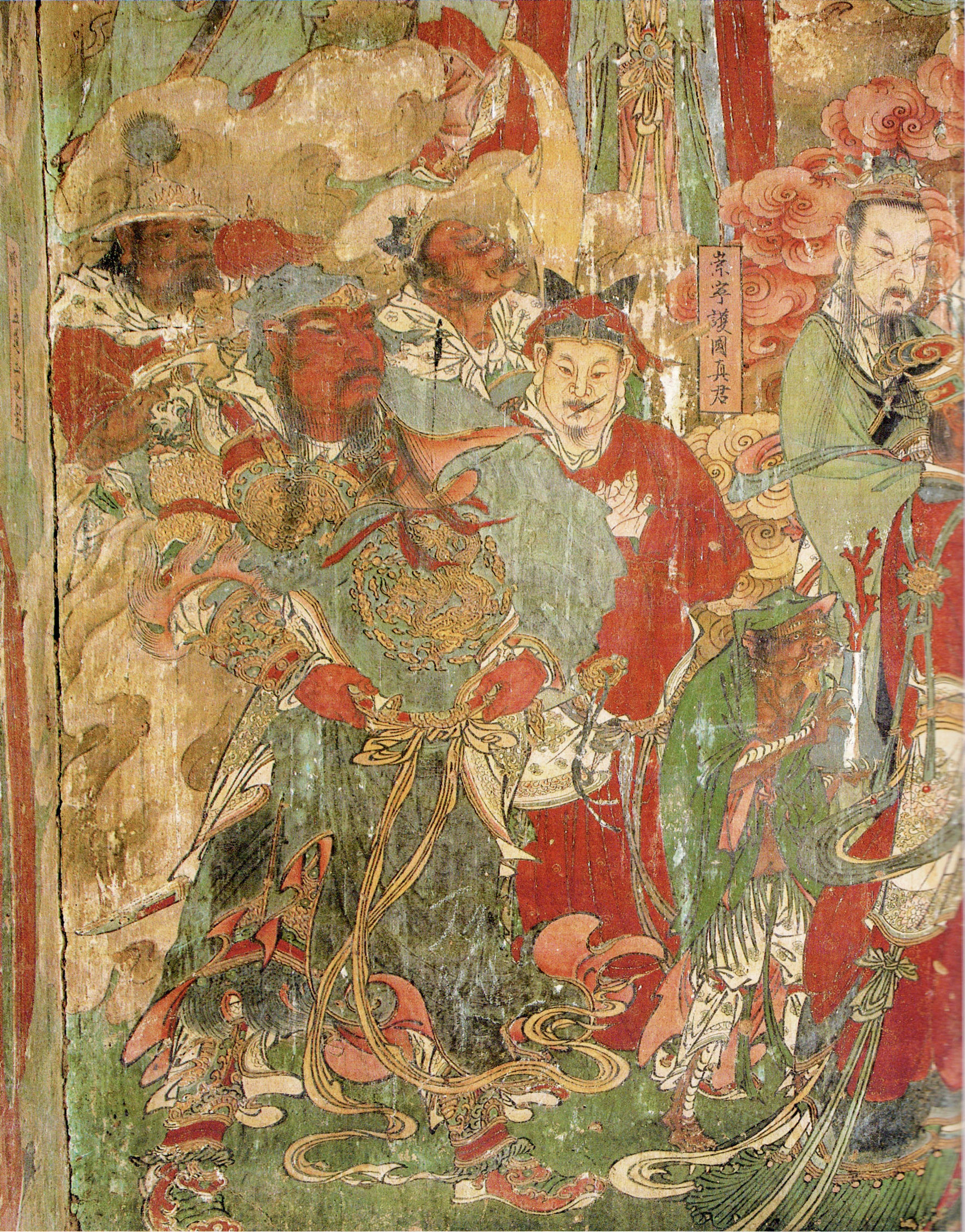
Guan Yu, as seen on mural from Pilu Temple, Shijiazhuang

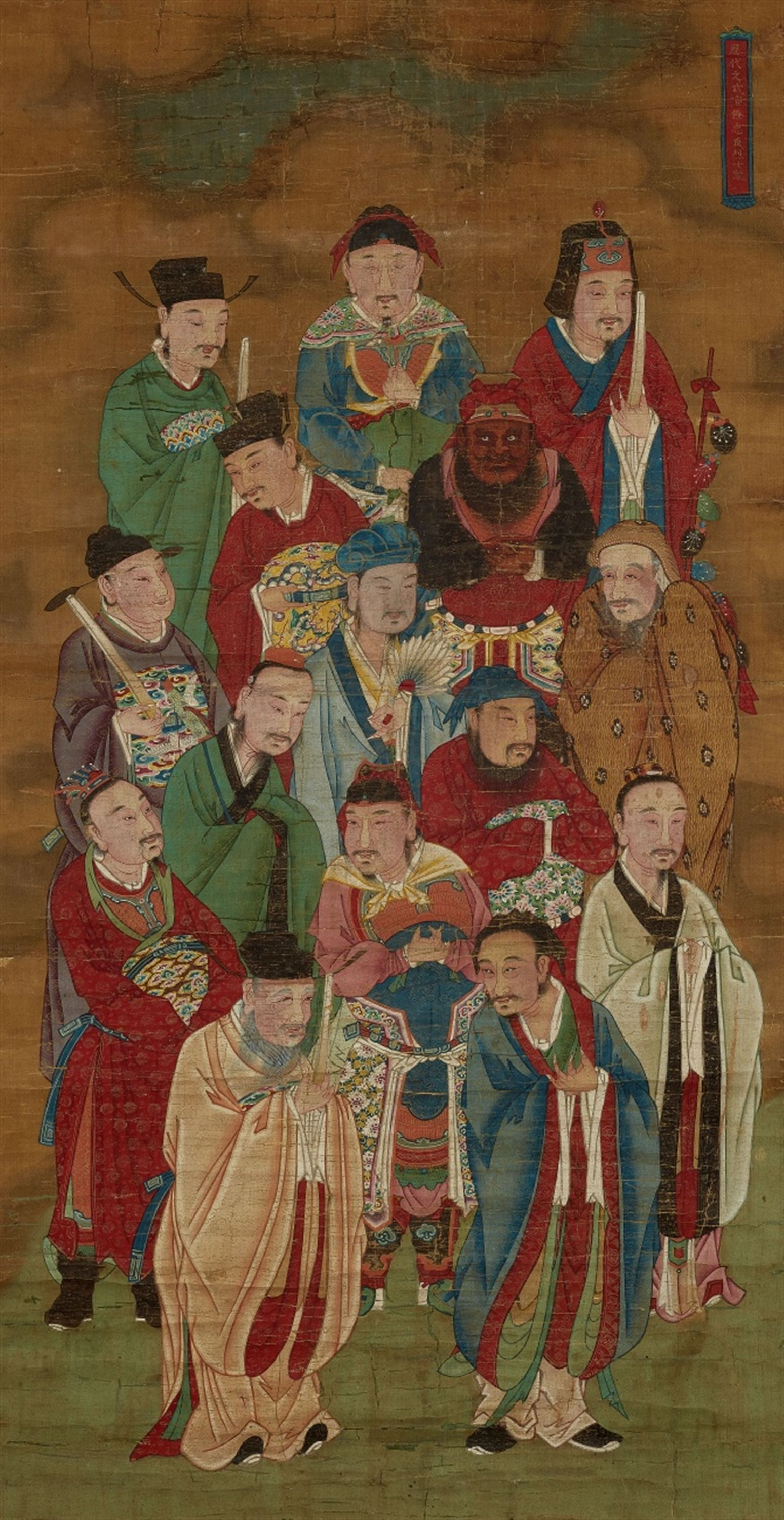
Officials of Former Times, Ming Dynasty

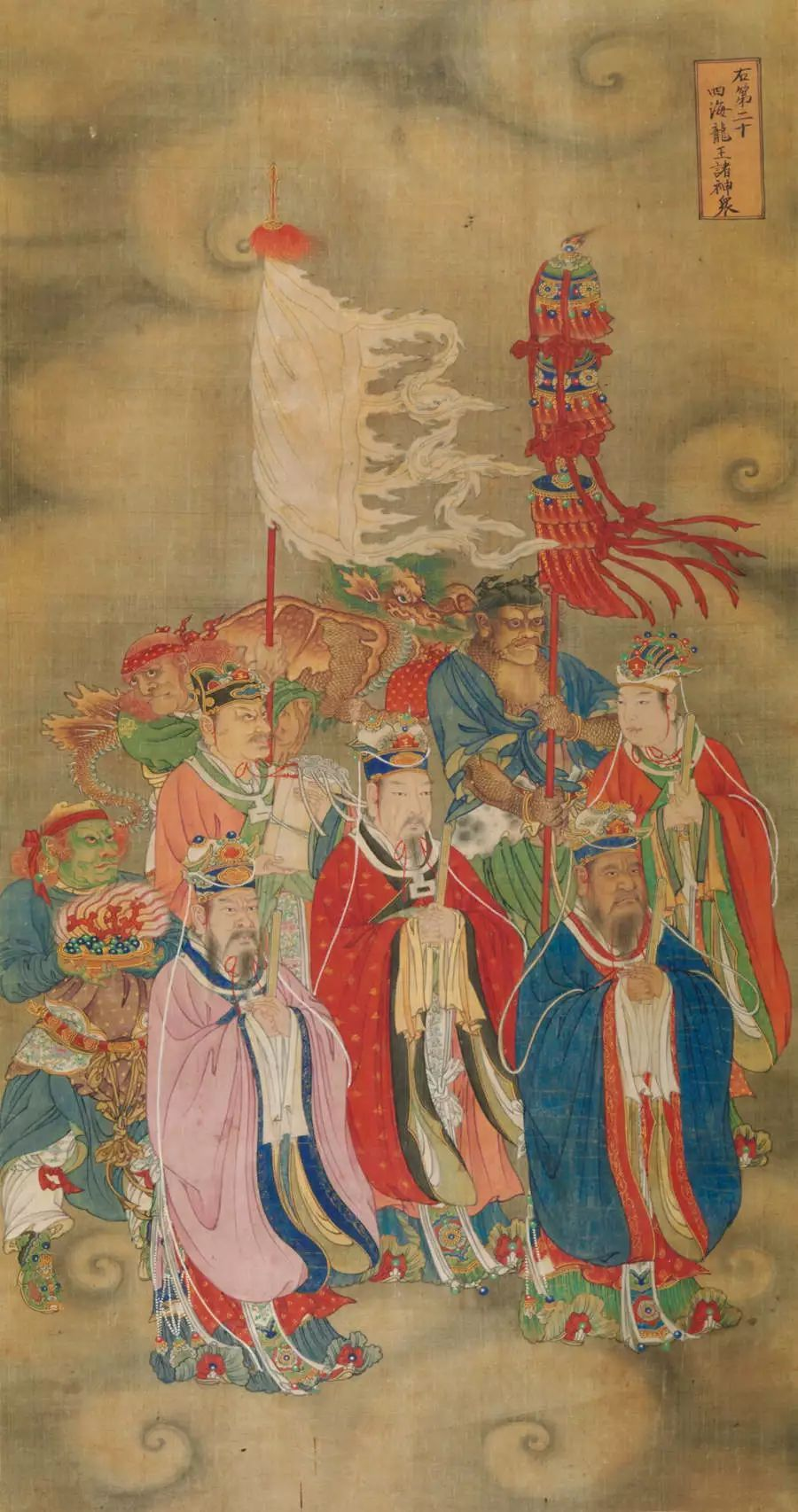
Four Dragon Kings, Baoning Temple, Ming Dynasty.

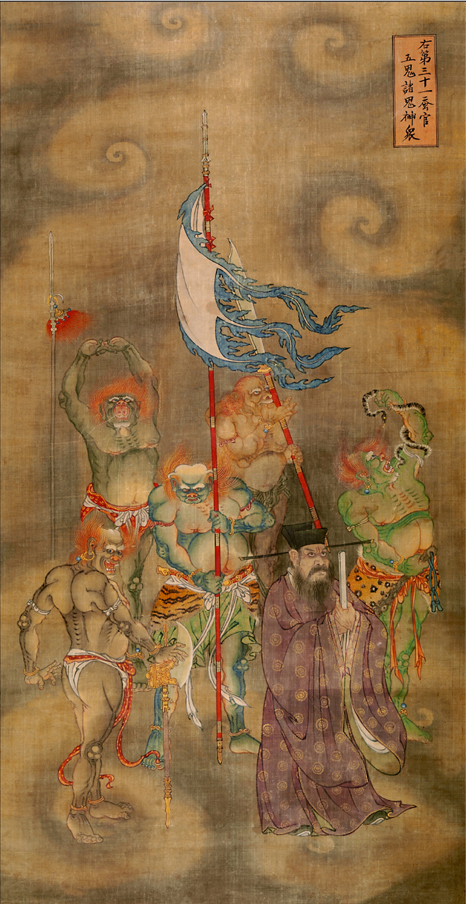
Canshen and the Five Demons of Pestilence, Baoning Temple, Ming dynasty

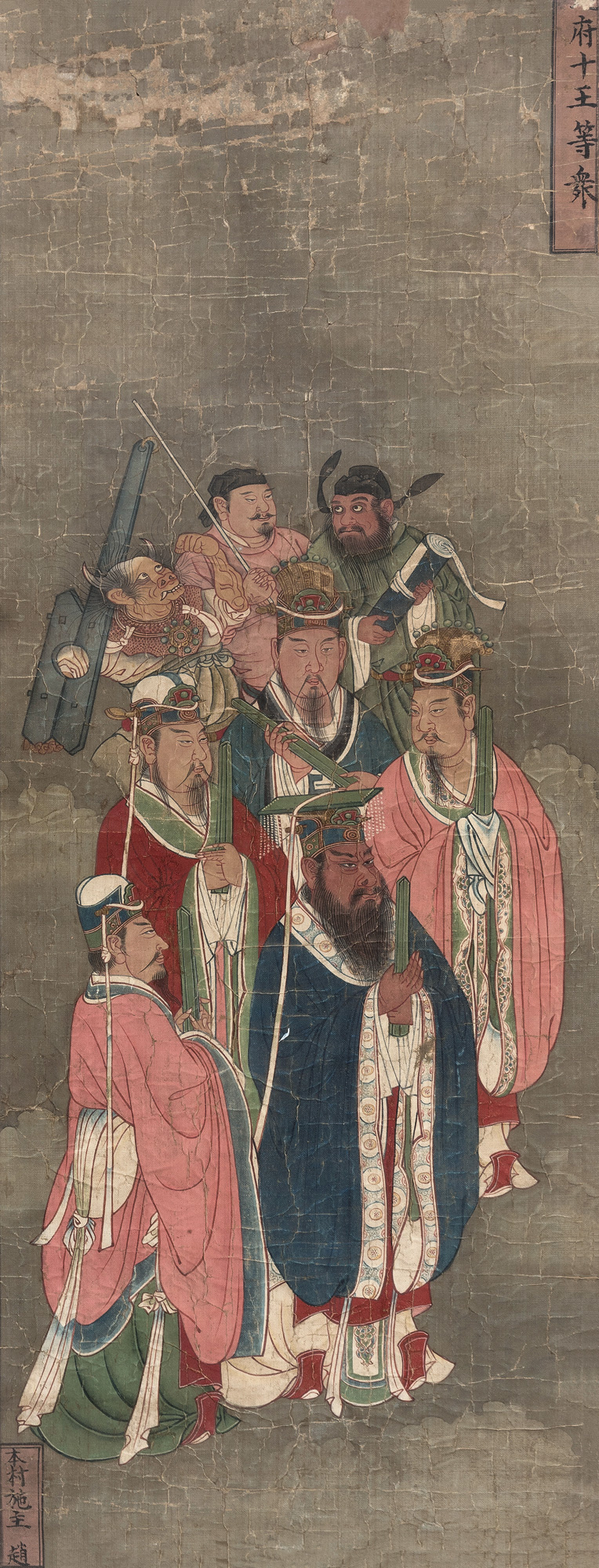
Ten Kings of Hell, Ming Dynasty

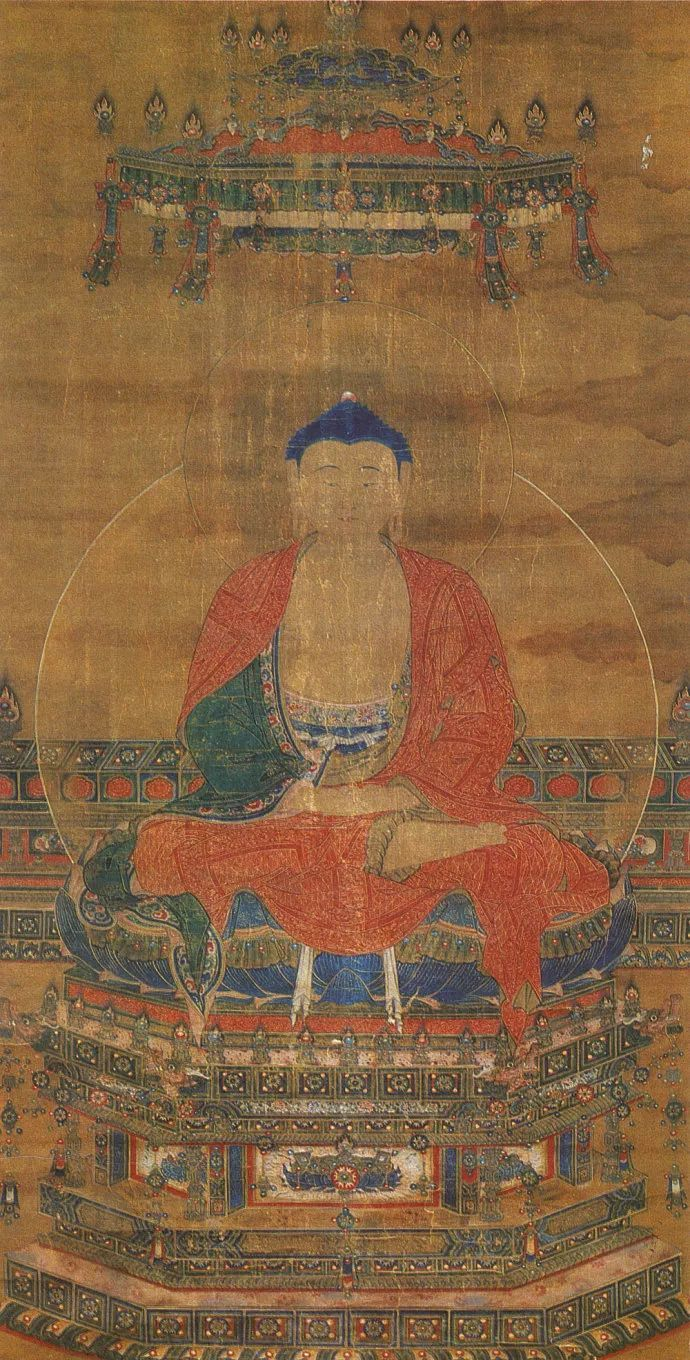
Amitabha, Baoning Temple, Ming Dynasty.

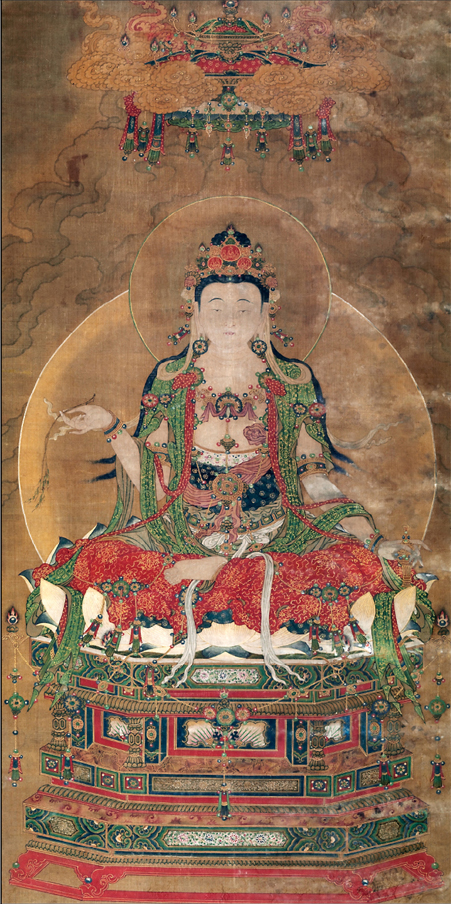
Guanyin, Baoning Temple, Ming dynasty

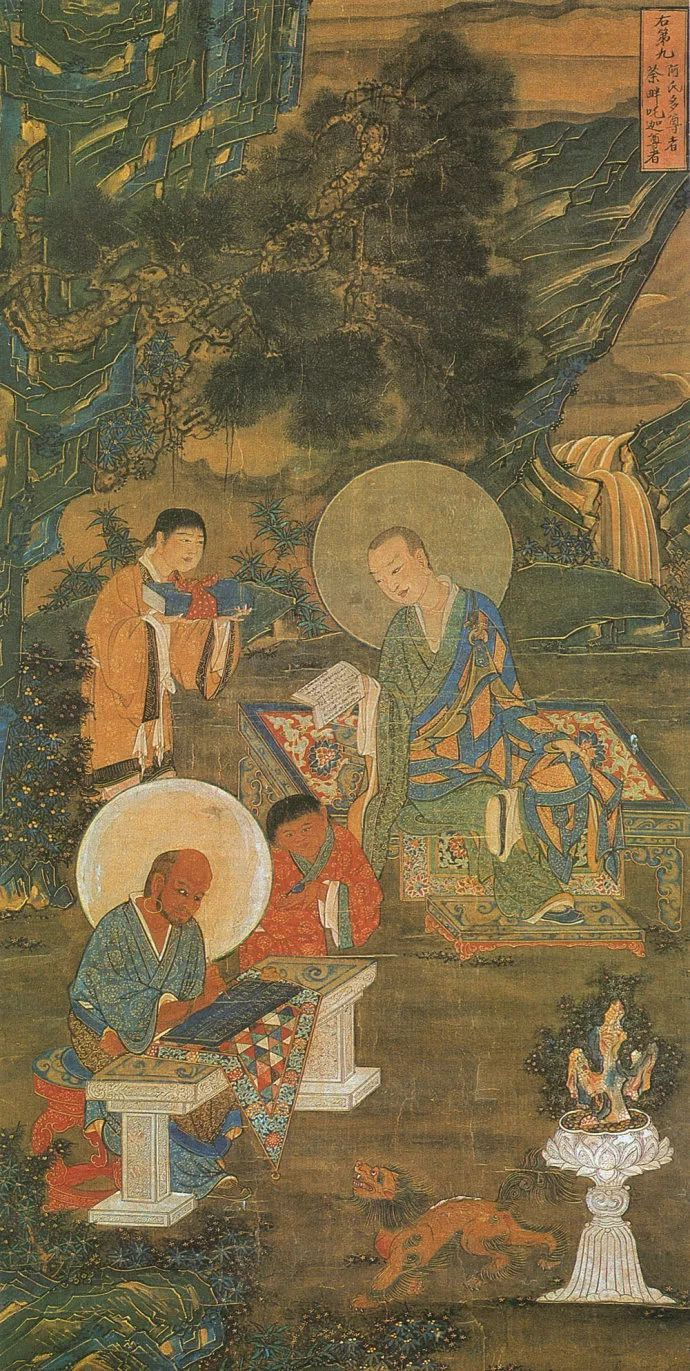
Ajita Arya, Baoning Temple, Ming Dynasty.

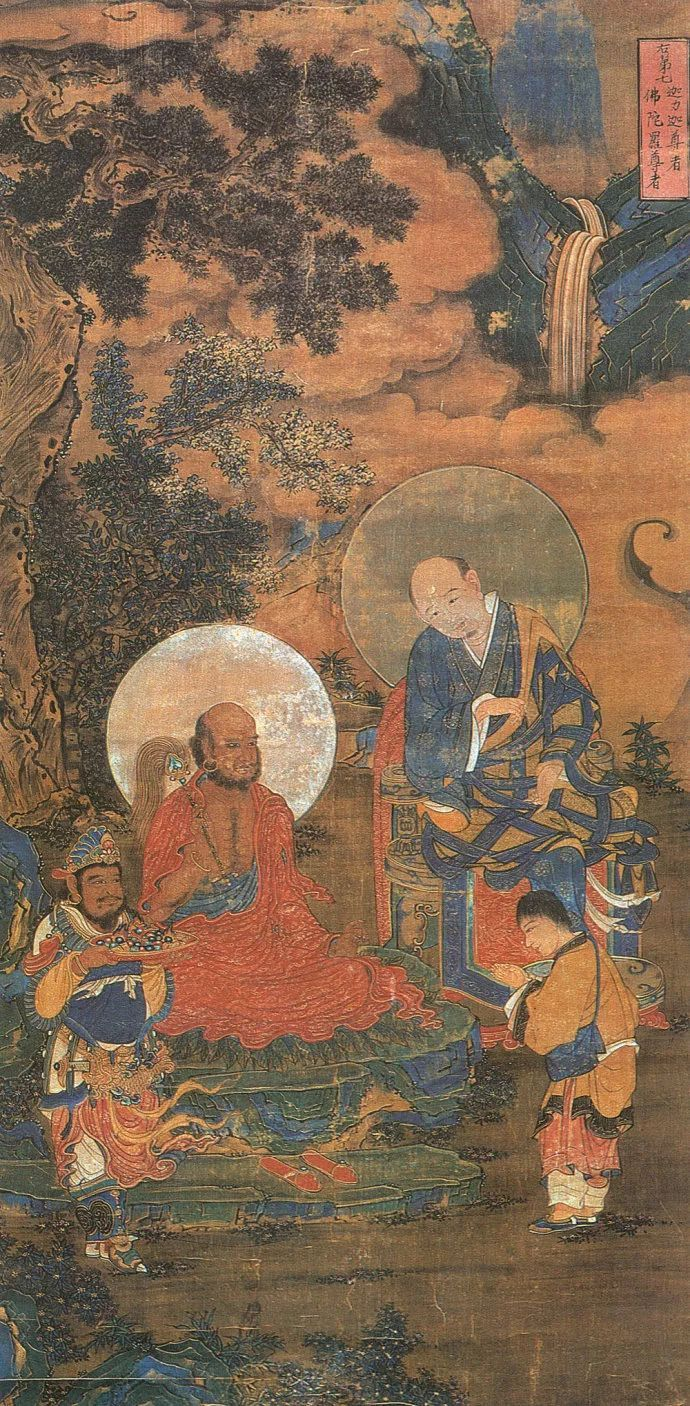
Two Luohans, Baoning Temple, Ming Dynasty.

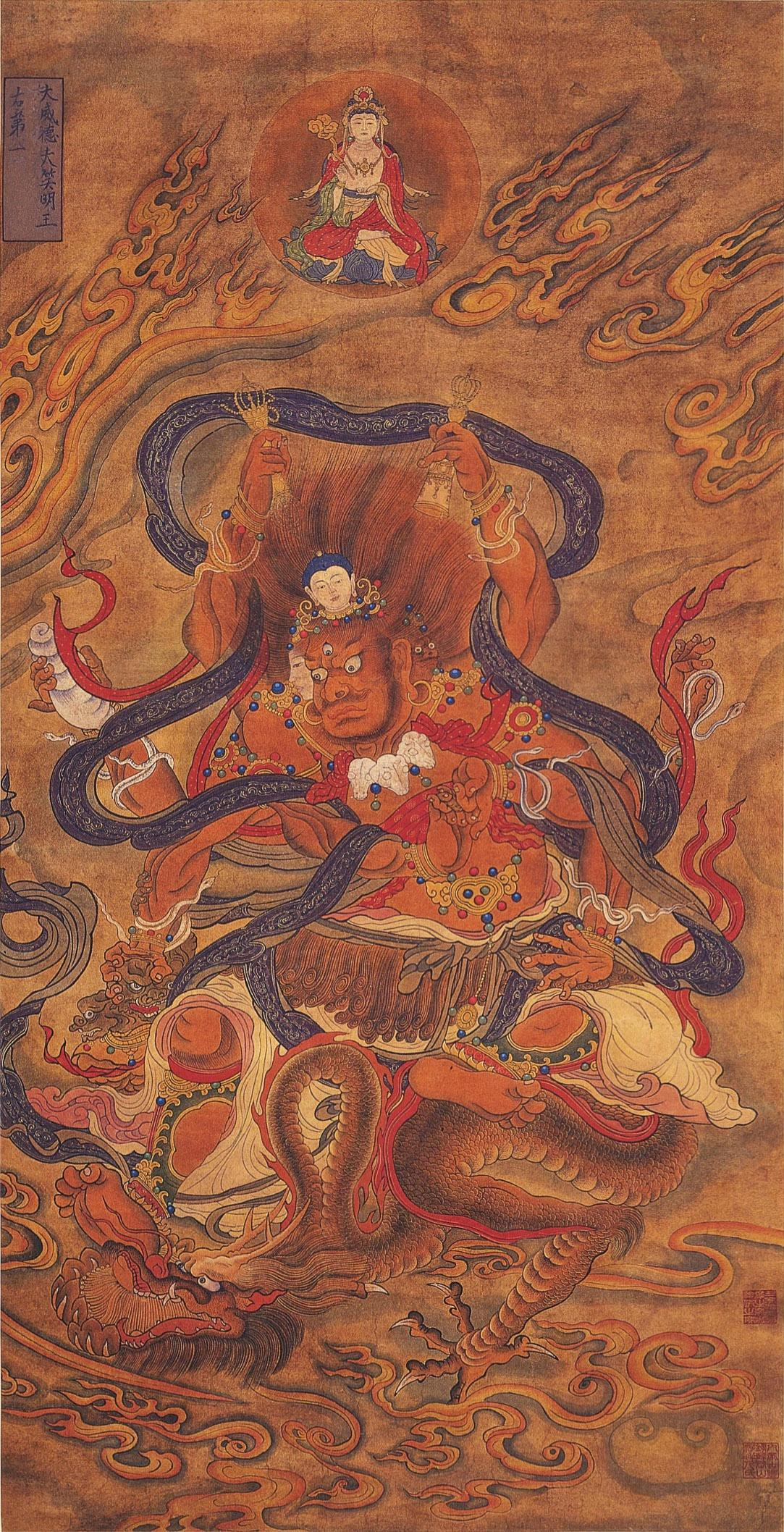
Vajrahāsa, of the Ten Wisdom Kings, Baoning Temple, Ming Dynasty.

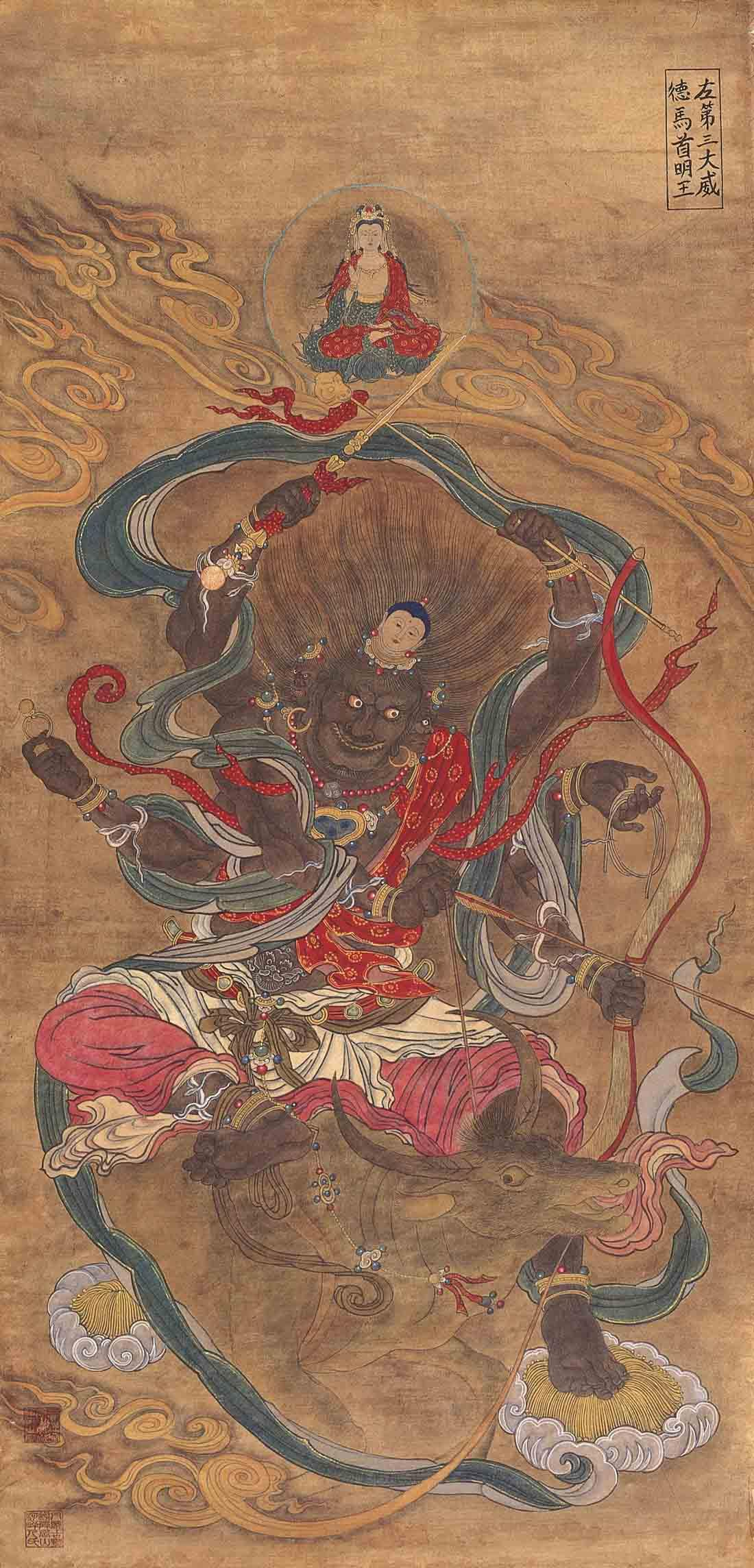
Hayagrīva, of the Ten Wisdom Kings, Baoning Temple, Ming Dynasty.

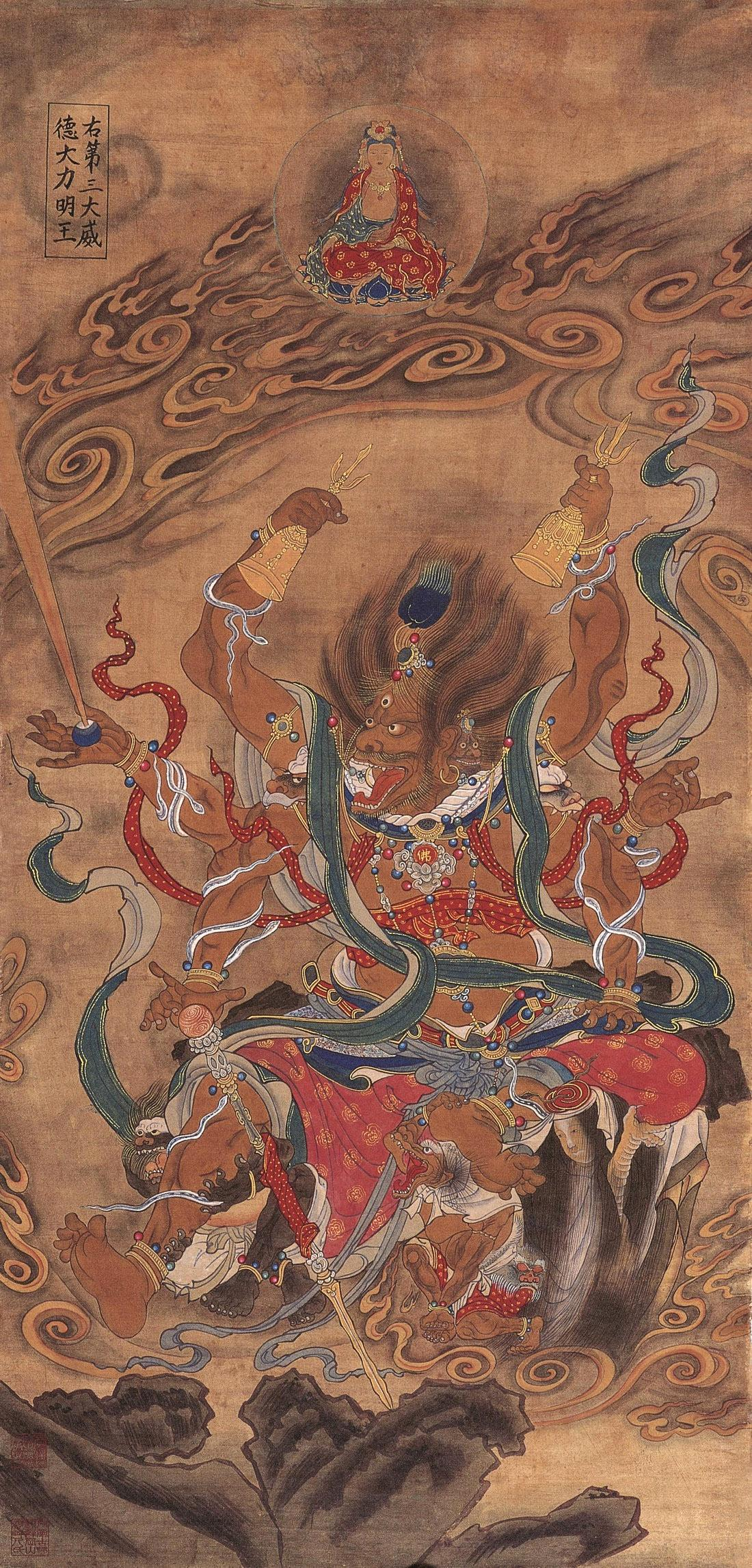
Mahābala, of the Ten Wisdom Kings, Baoning Temple, Ming Dynasty.

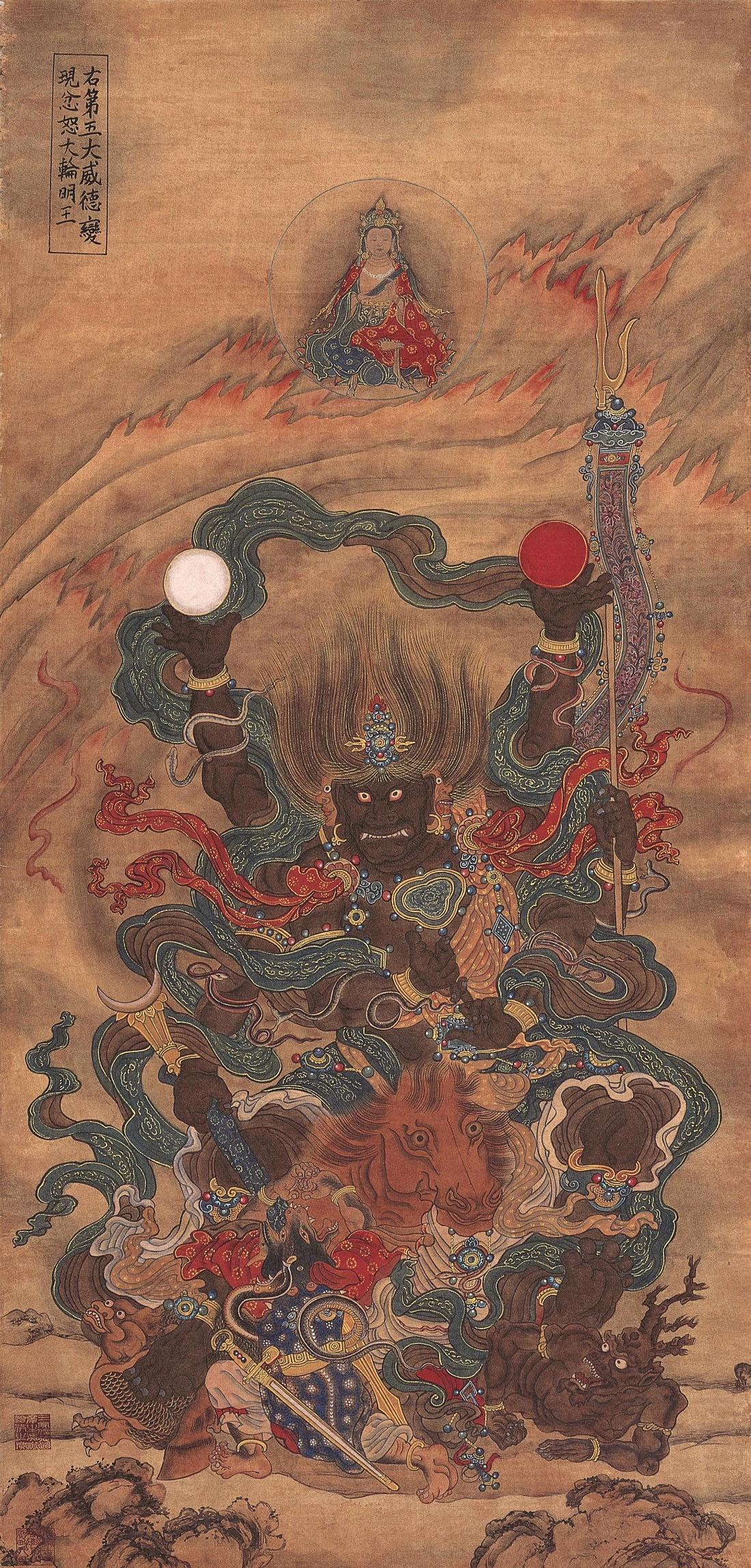
Mahācakra, of the Ten Wisdom Kings, Baoning Temple, Ming Dynasty.

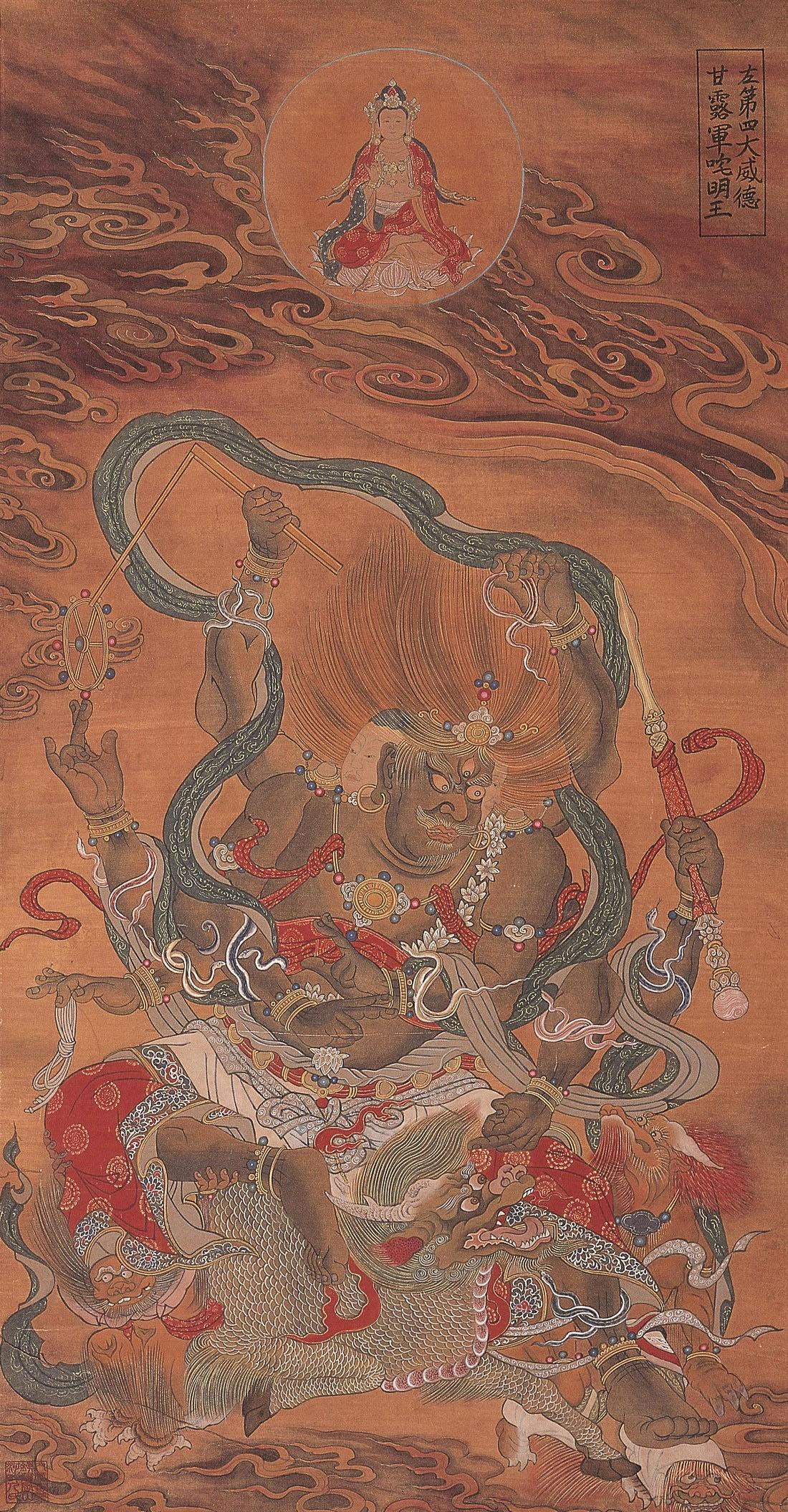
Kuṇḍali, of the Ten Wisdom Kings, Baoning Temple, Ming Dynasty.

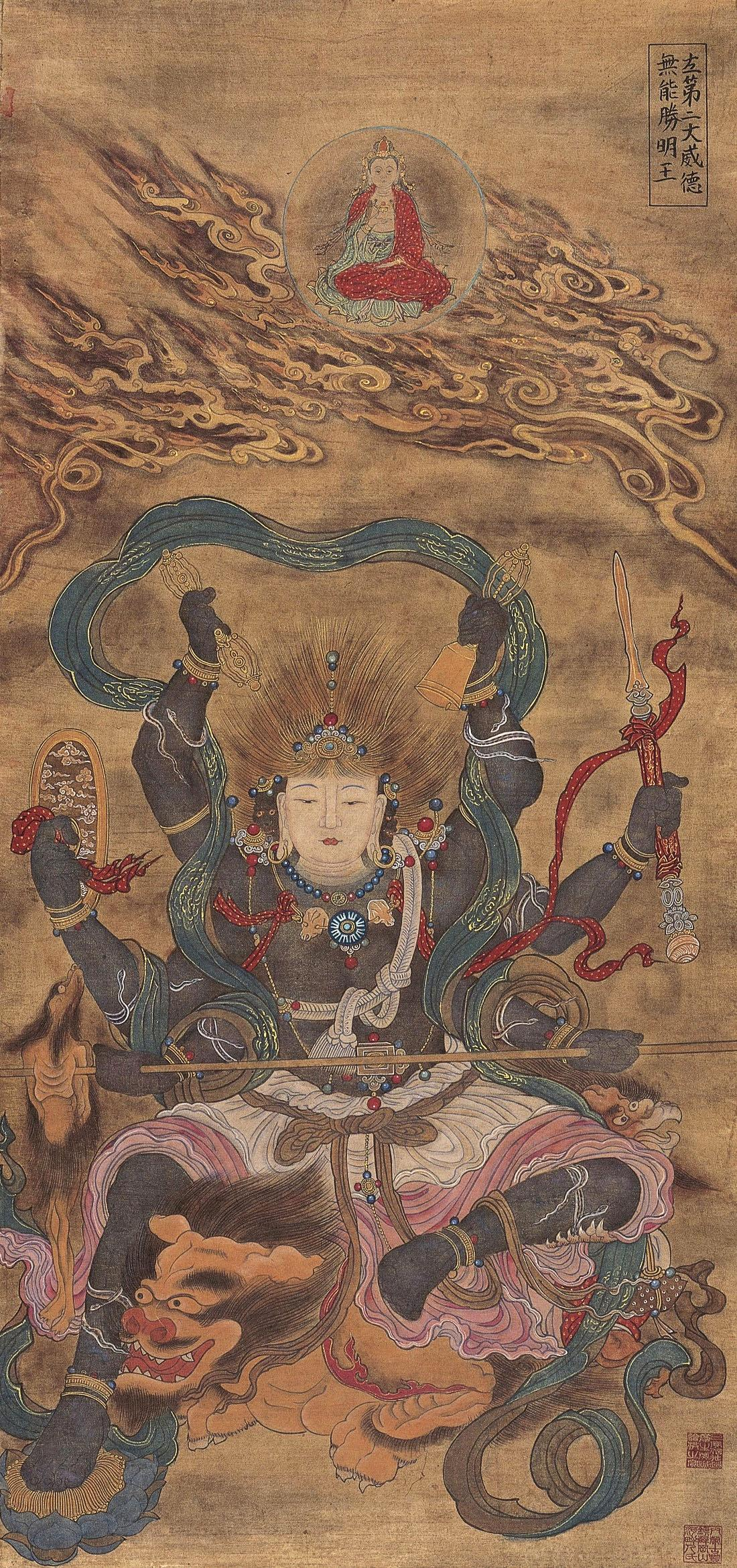
Aparājita, of the Ten Wisdom Kings, Baoning Temple, Ming Dynasty.

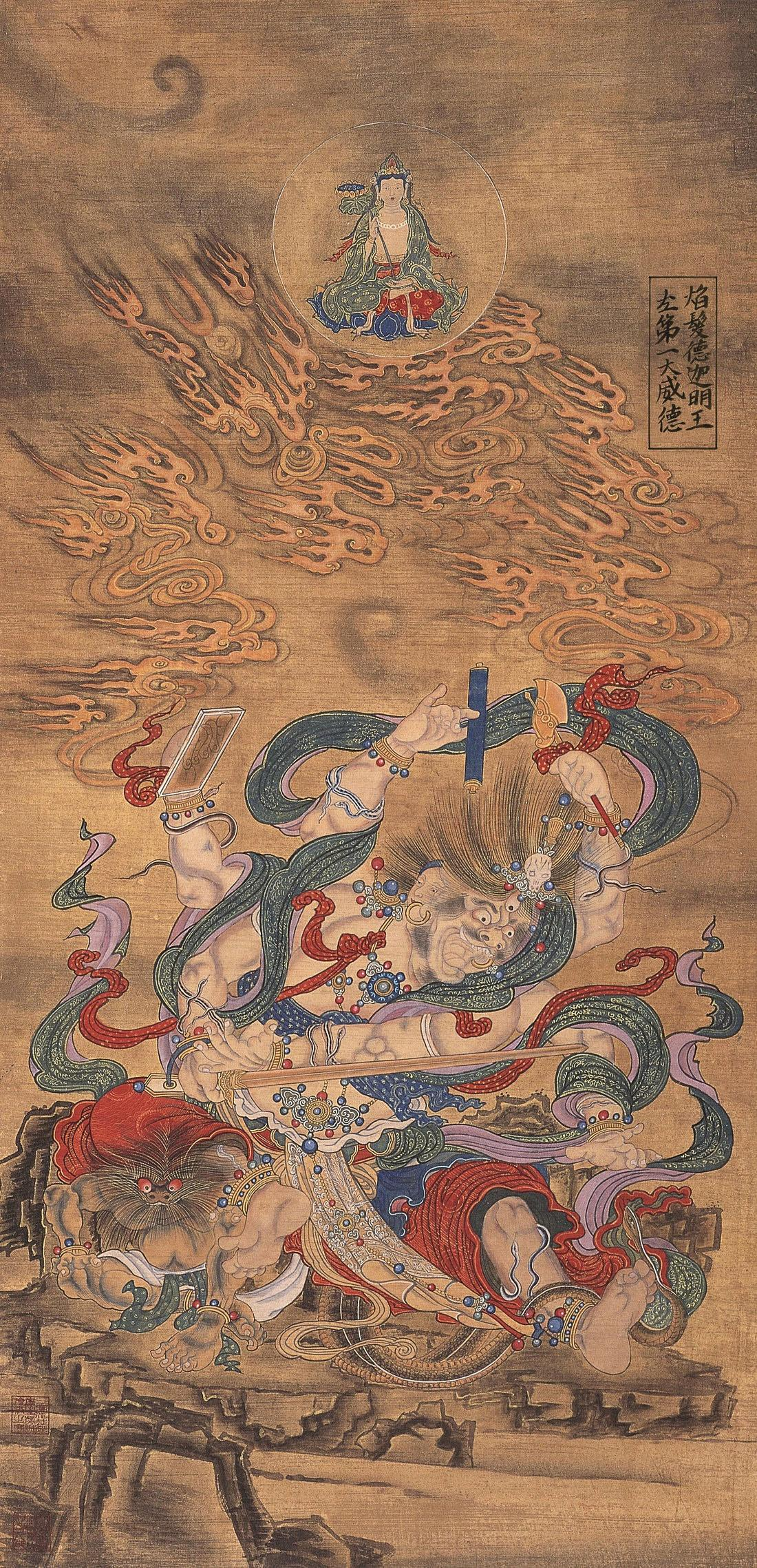
Yamantaka, of the Ten Wisdom Kings, Baoning Temple, Ming Dynasty.

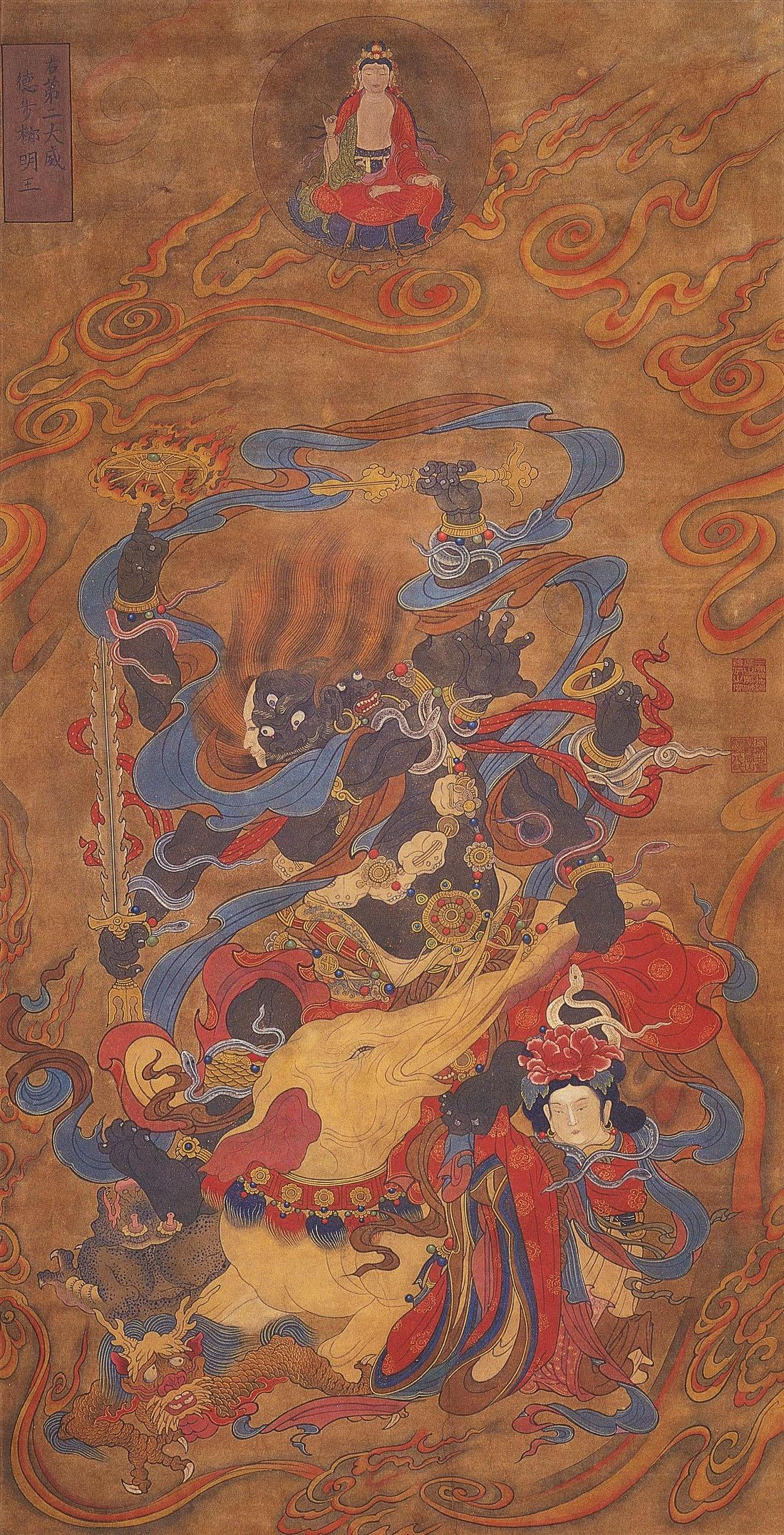
Padanaksipa, of the Ten Wisdom Kings, Baoning Temple, Ming Dynasty.

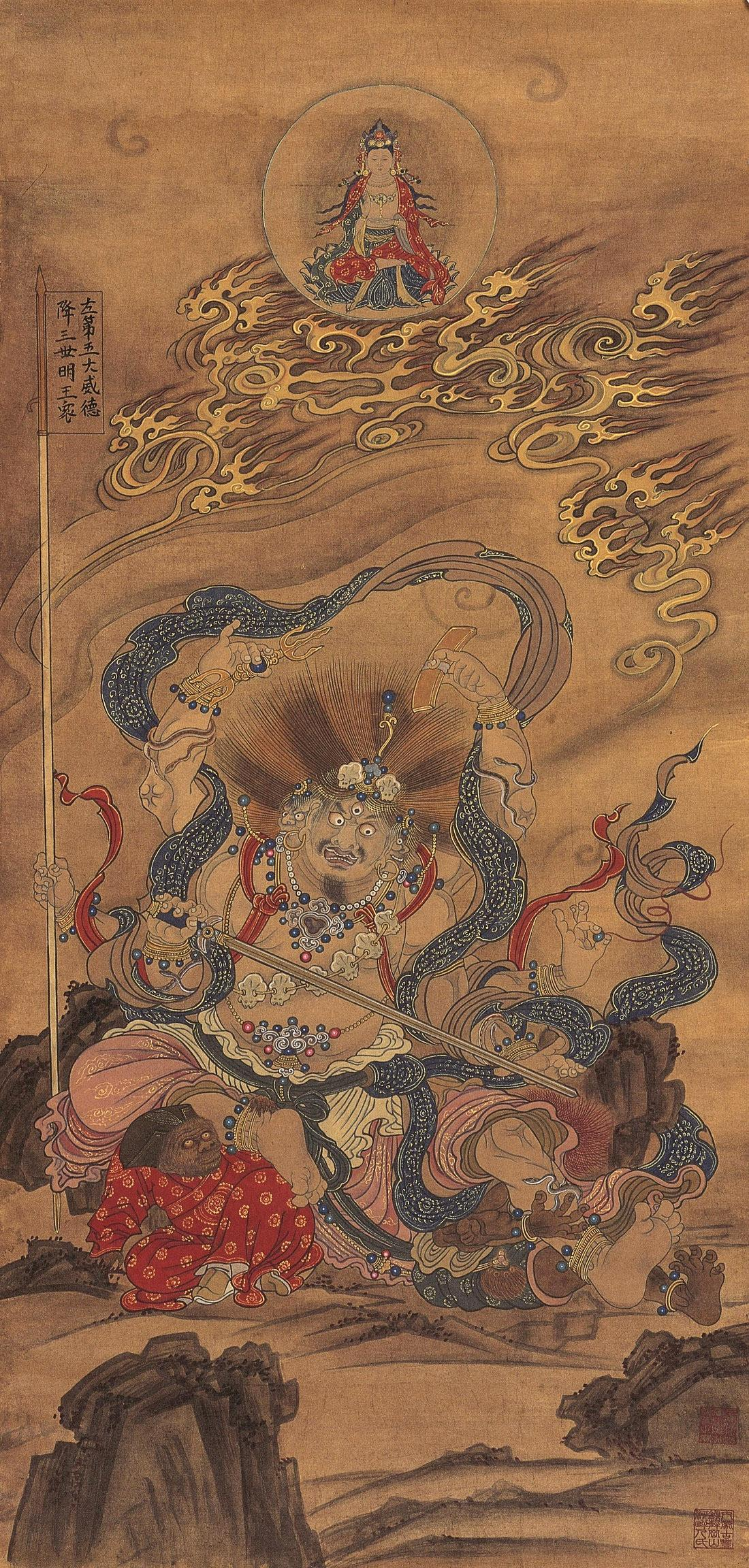
Trailokyavijaya, of the Ten Wisdom Kings, Baoning Temple, Ming Dynasty.

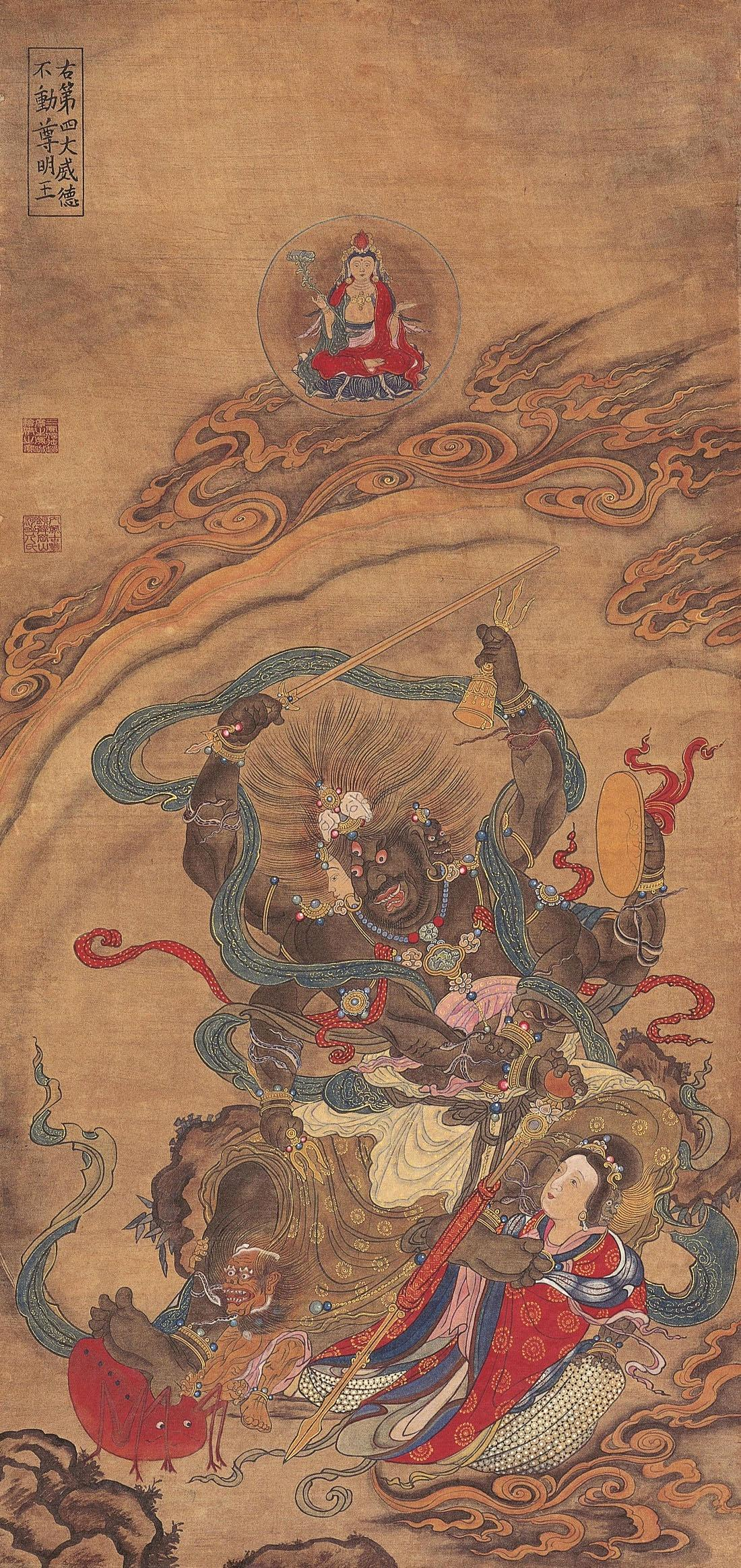
Acala, of the Ten Wisdom Kings, Baoning Temple, Ming Dynasty.

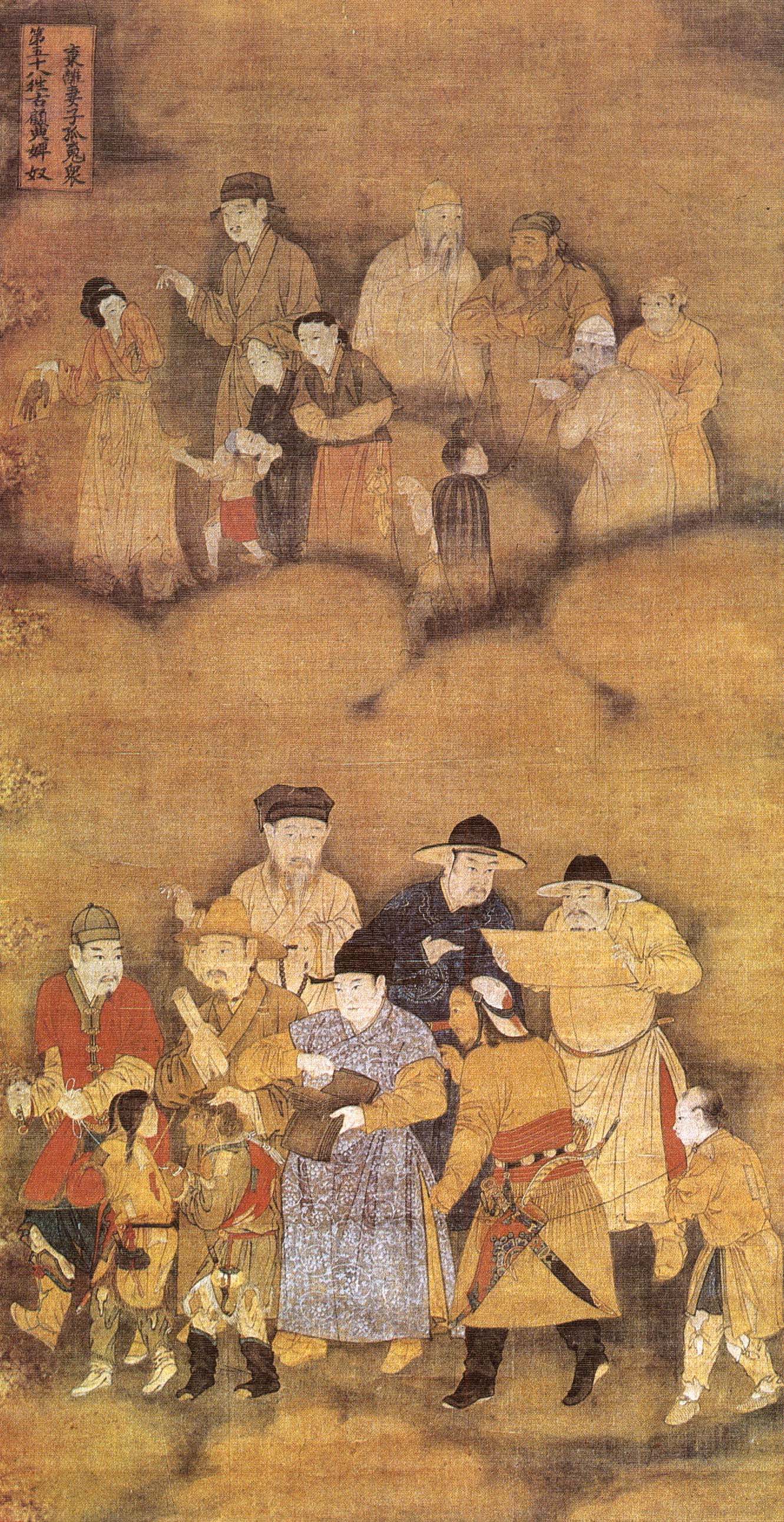
Indentured servants and slaves separated from family, Baoning Temple, Ming Dynasty

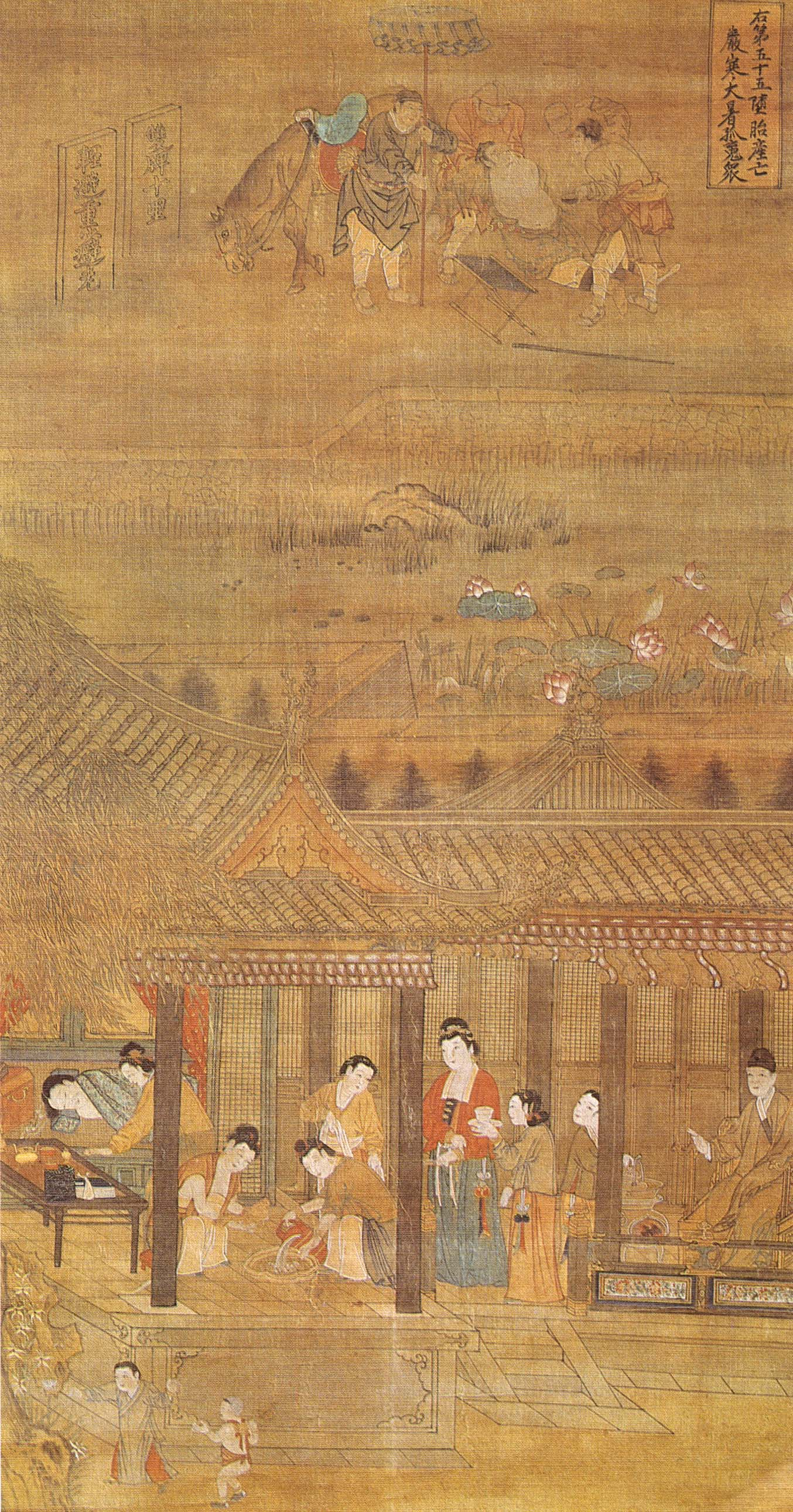
Death from miscarriage, severe cold and great heat, Baoning Temple, Ming Dynasty.

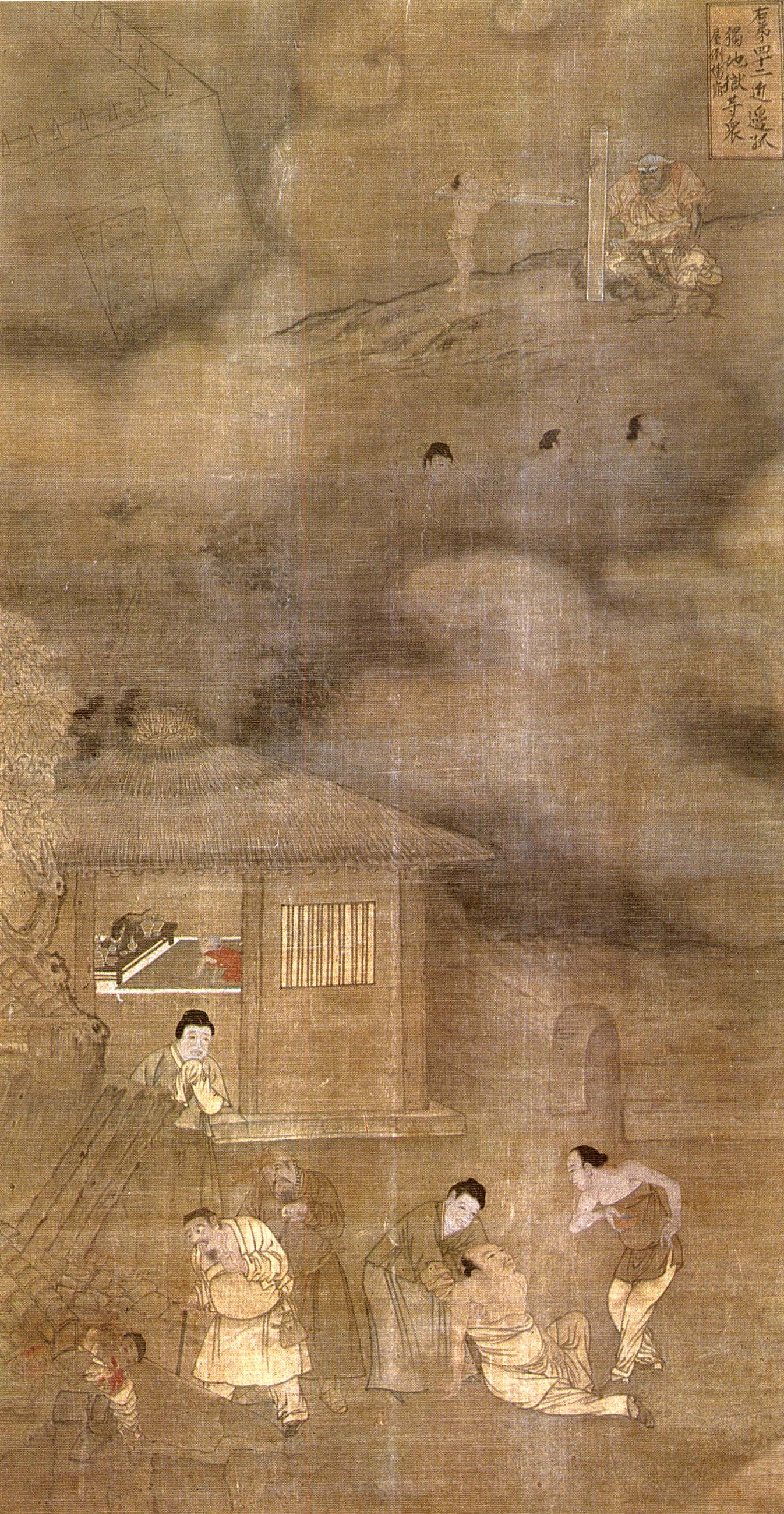
Death from building collapse, Baoning Temple, Ming Dynasty.

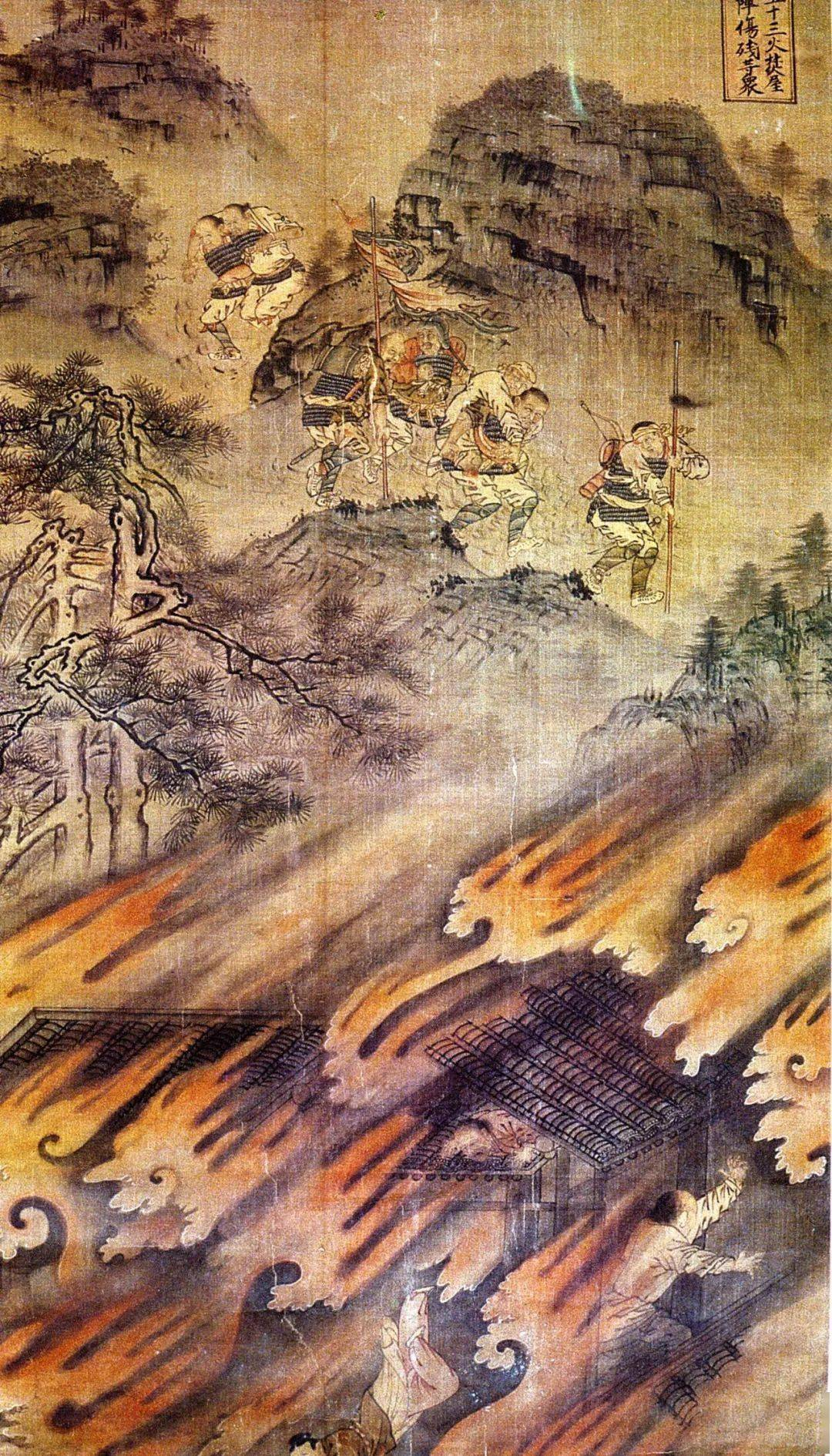
Death from wars and fire, Baoning Temple, Ming Dynasty.

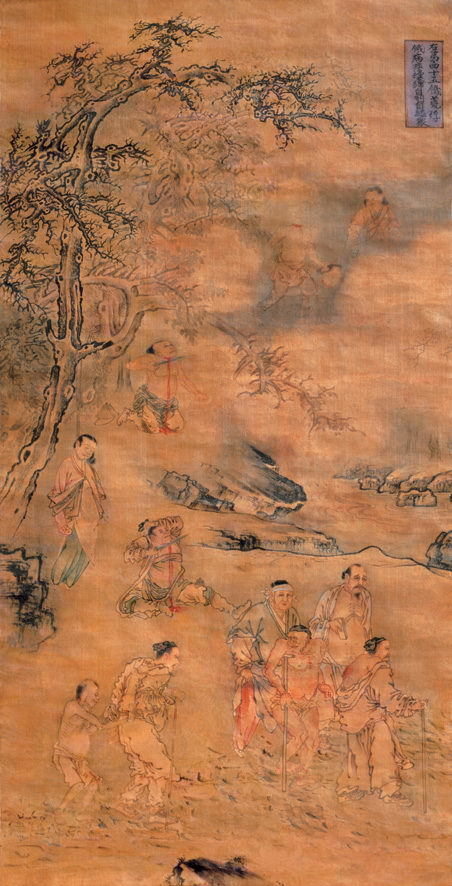
Death from starvation, sickness and suicide, Baoning Temple, Ming Dynasty.

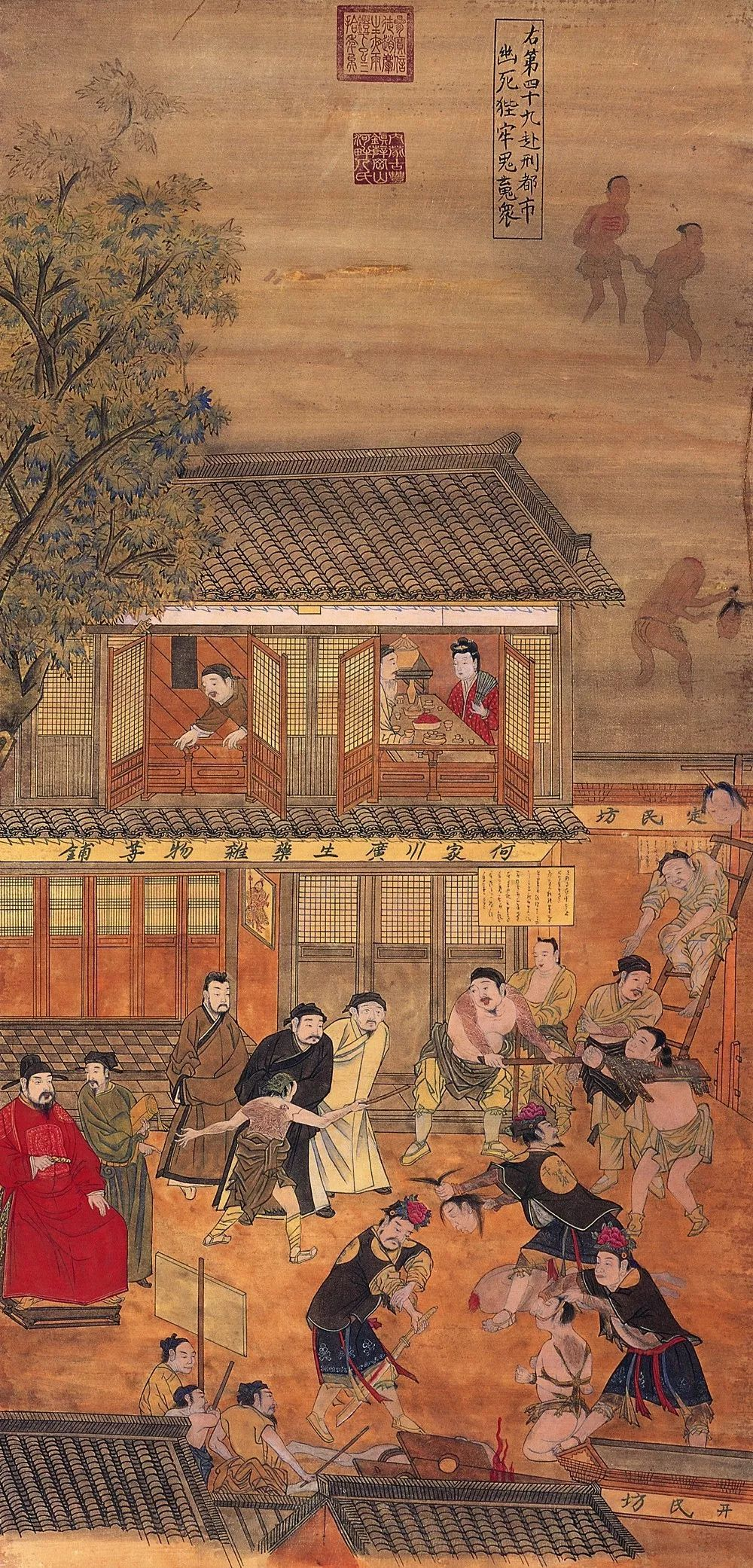
Death from capital punishment and imprisonement, Baoning Temple, Ming Dynasty

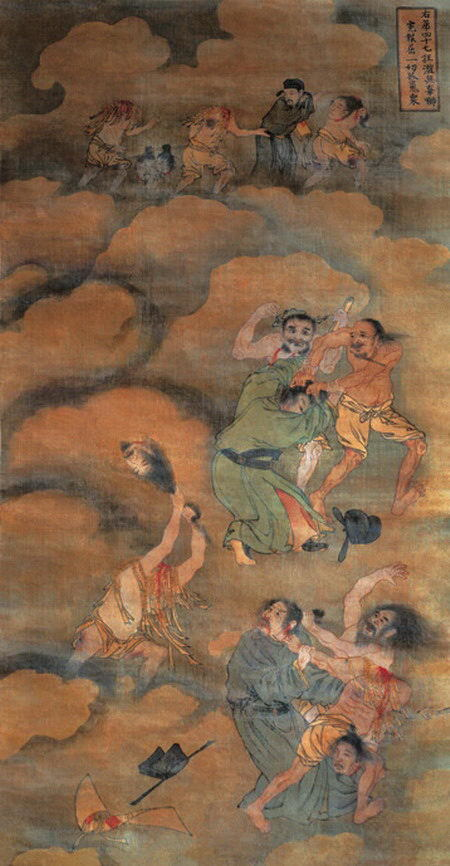
Death from the wronged, Baoning Temple, Ming Dynasty.

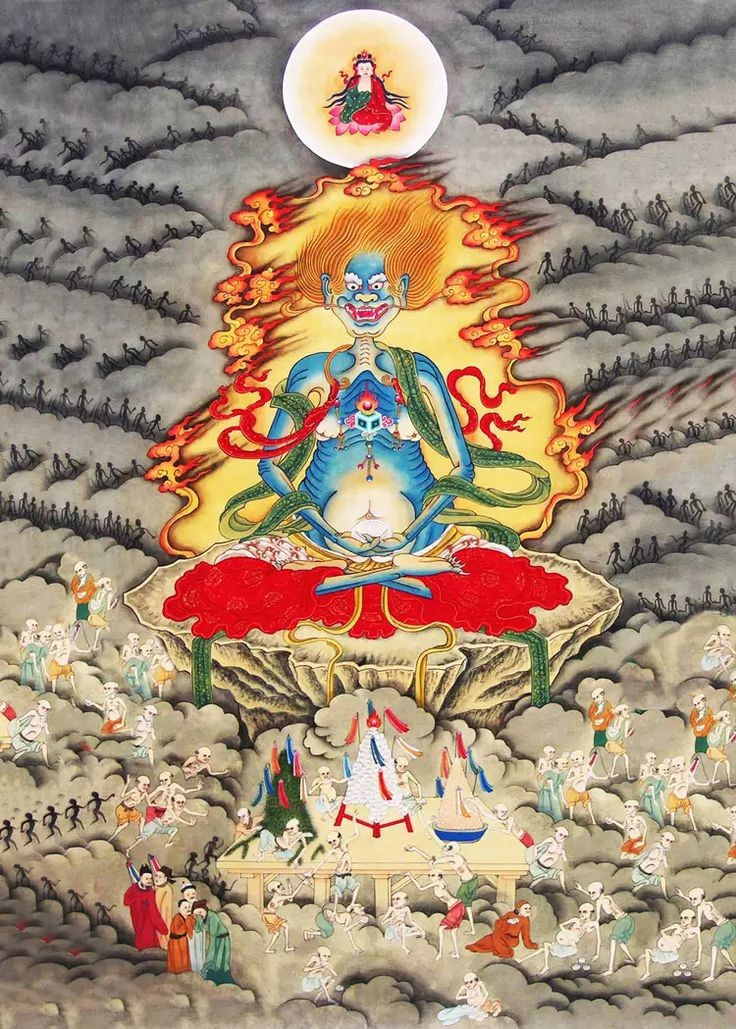
Ulkāmukha Pretarāja, Baoning Temple, Ming Dynasty.

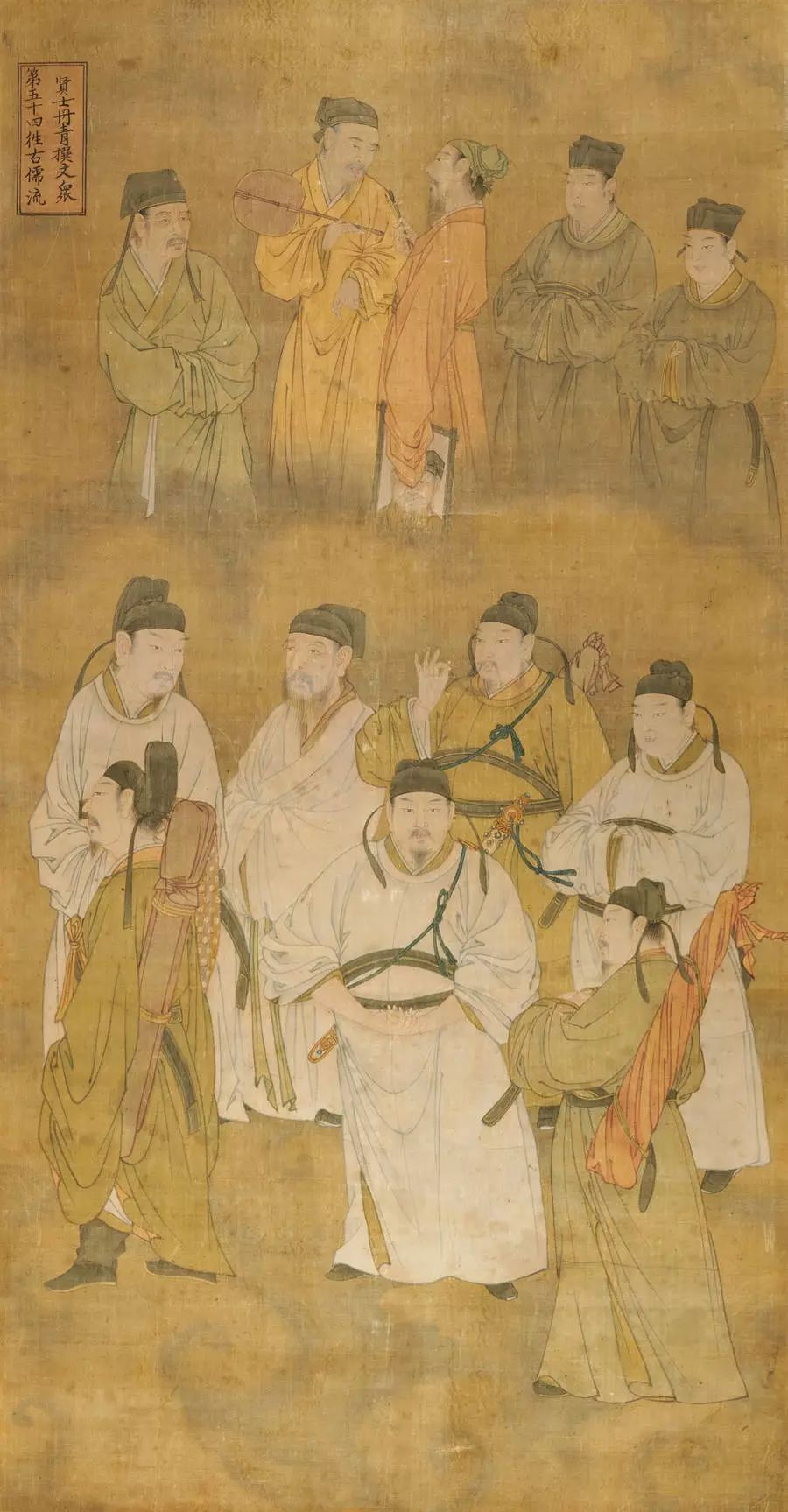
Scholars and students, Baoning Temple, Ming Dynasty.

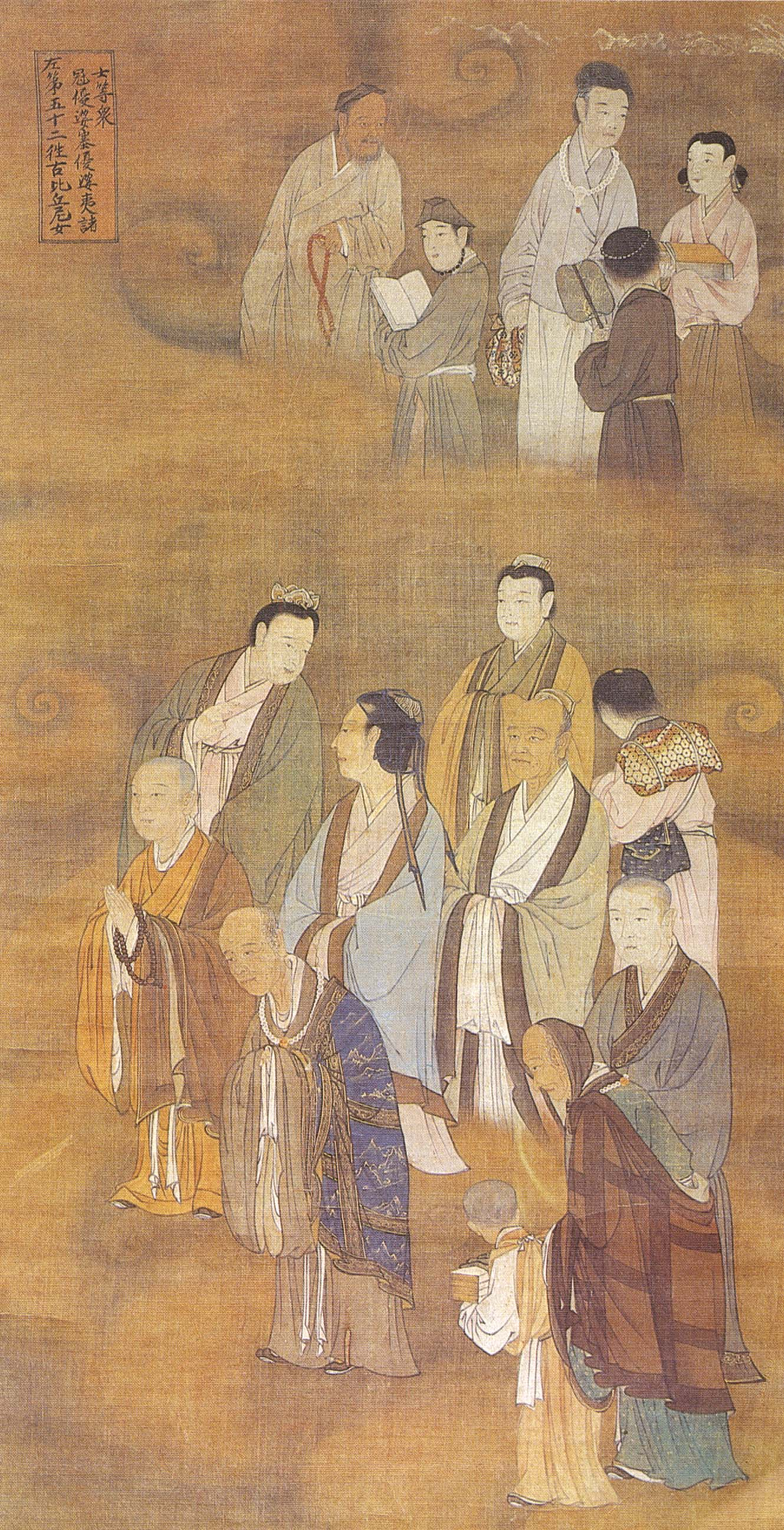
Buddhist bhikkuni in waiting, Baoning Temple, Ming Dynasty.

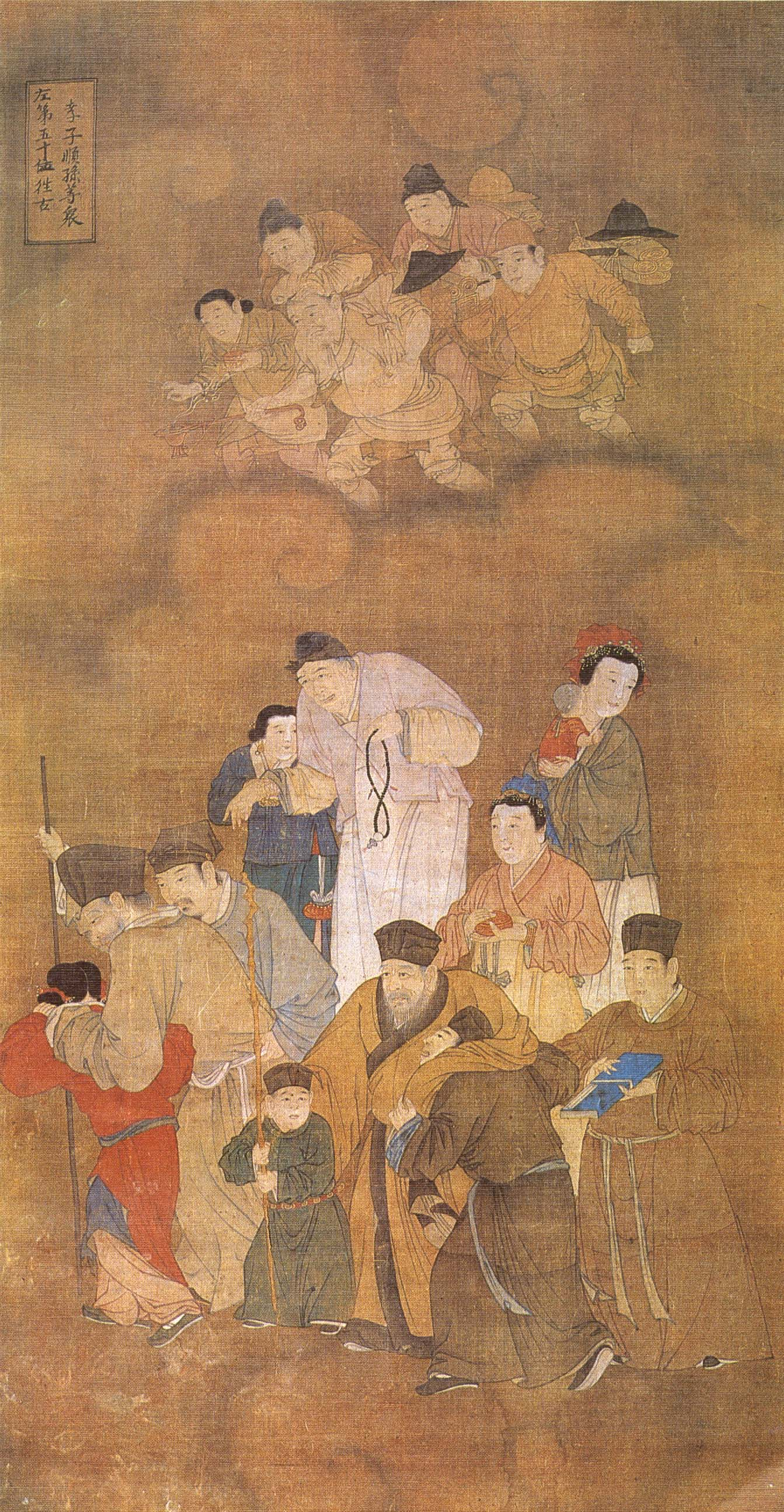
Filial children and grandchildren in waiting, Baoning Temple, Ming Dynasty.

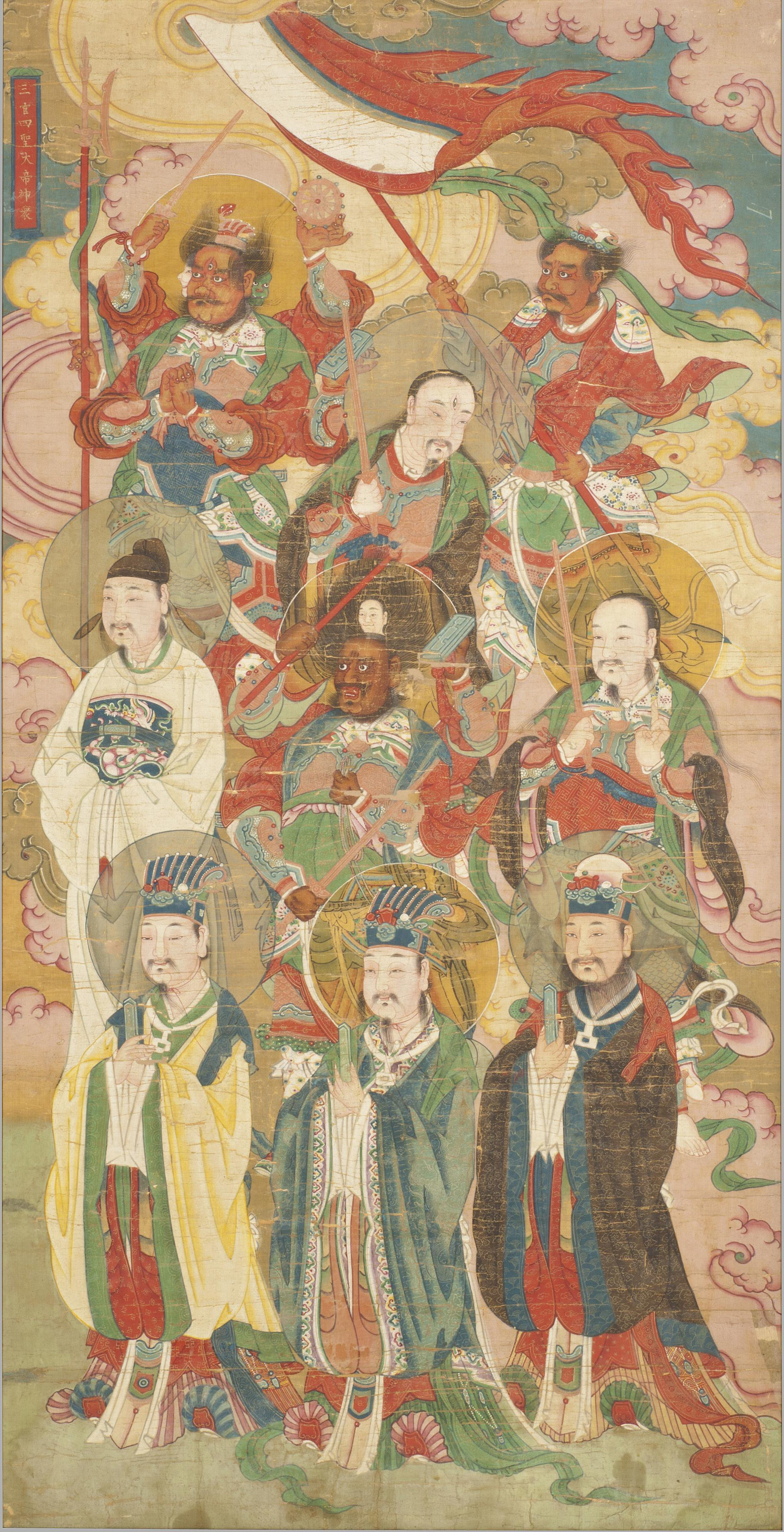
Three Officials, Four Saints, and the Great Emperor, Qing dynasty

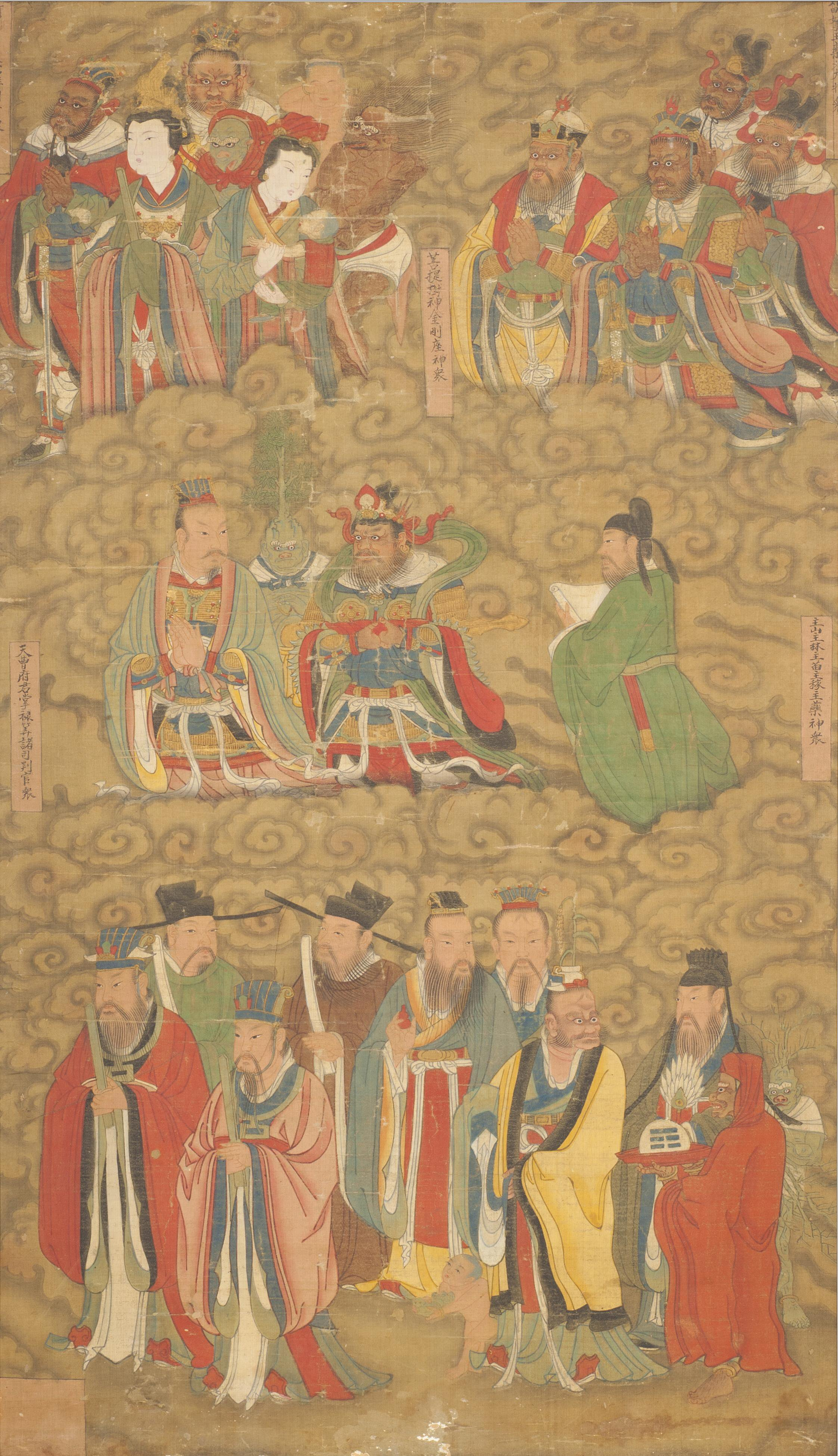
Guardians and Deities from the Water-Land Ritual, Qing dynasty

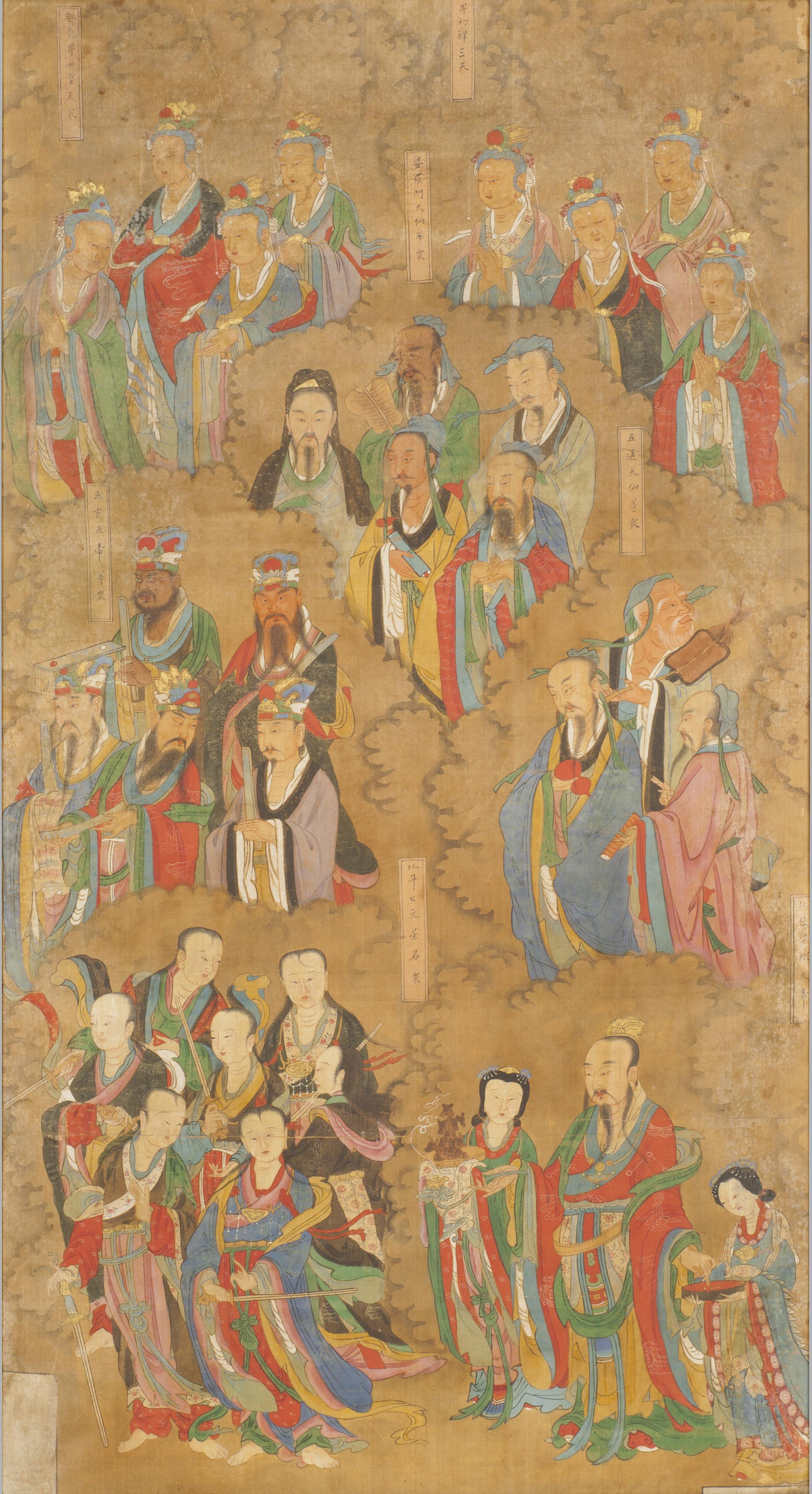
Buddhist, Daoist, and Folk Deities from the Water-Land Ritual, Qing dynasty

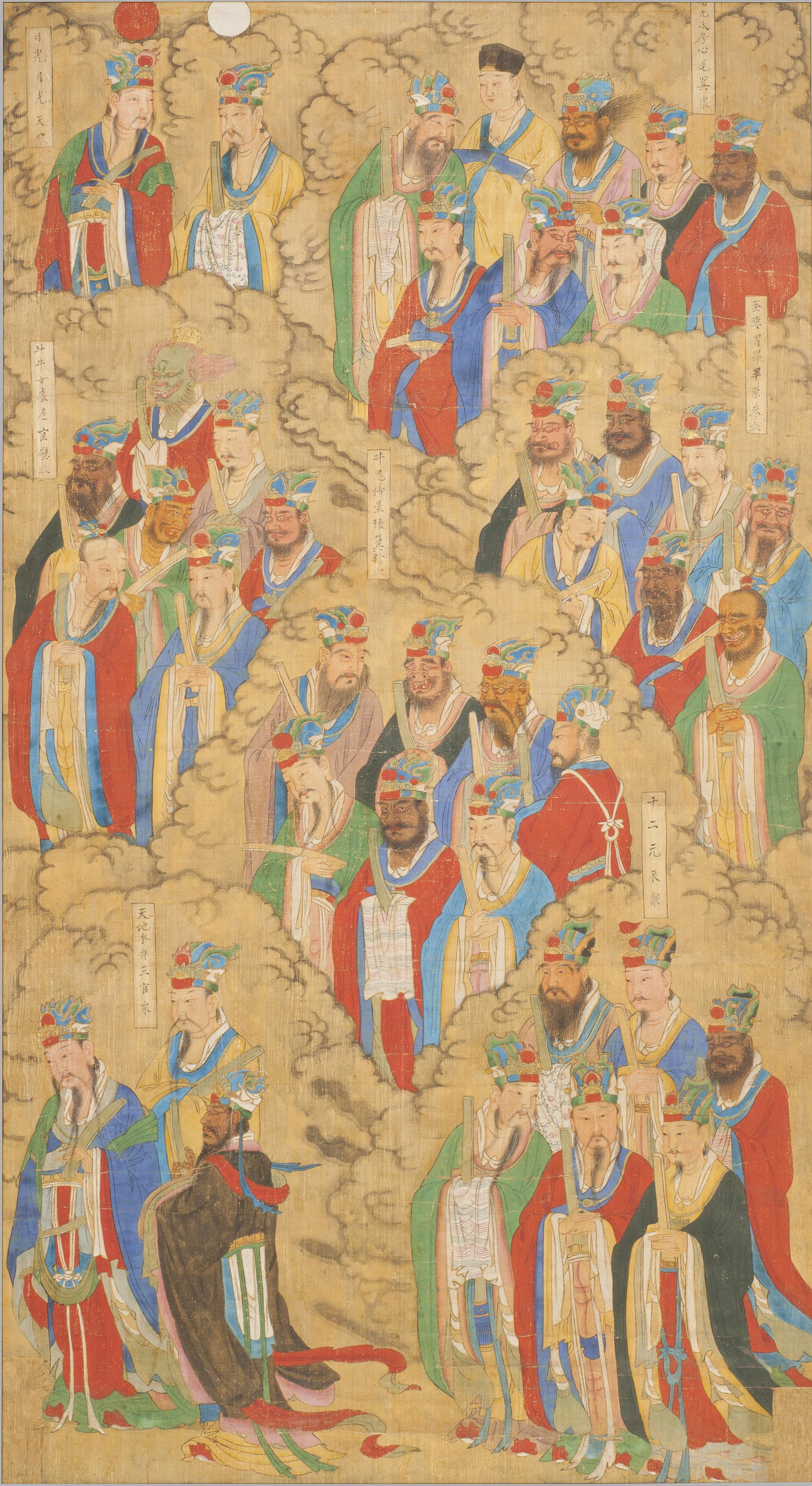
Heavenly and Earthly Deities from the Water-Land Ritual, Qing dynasty

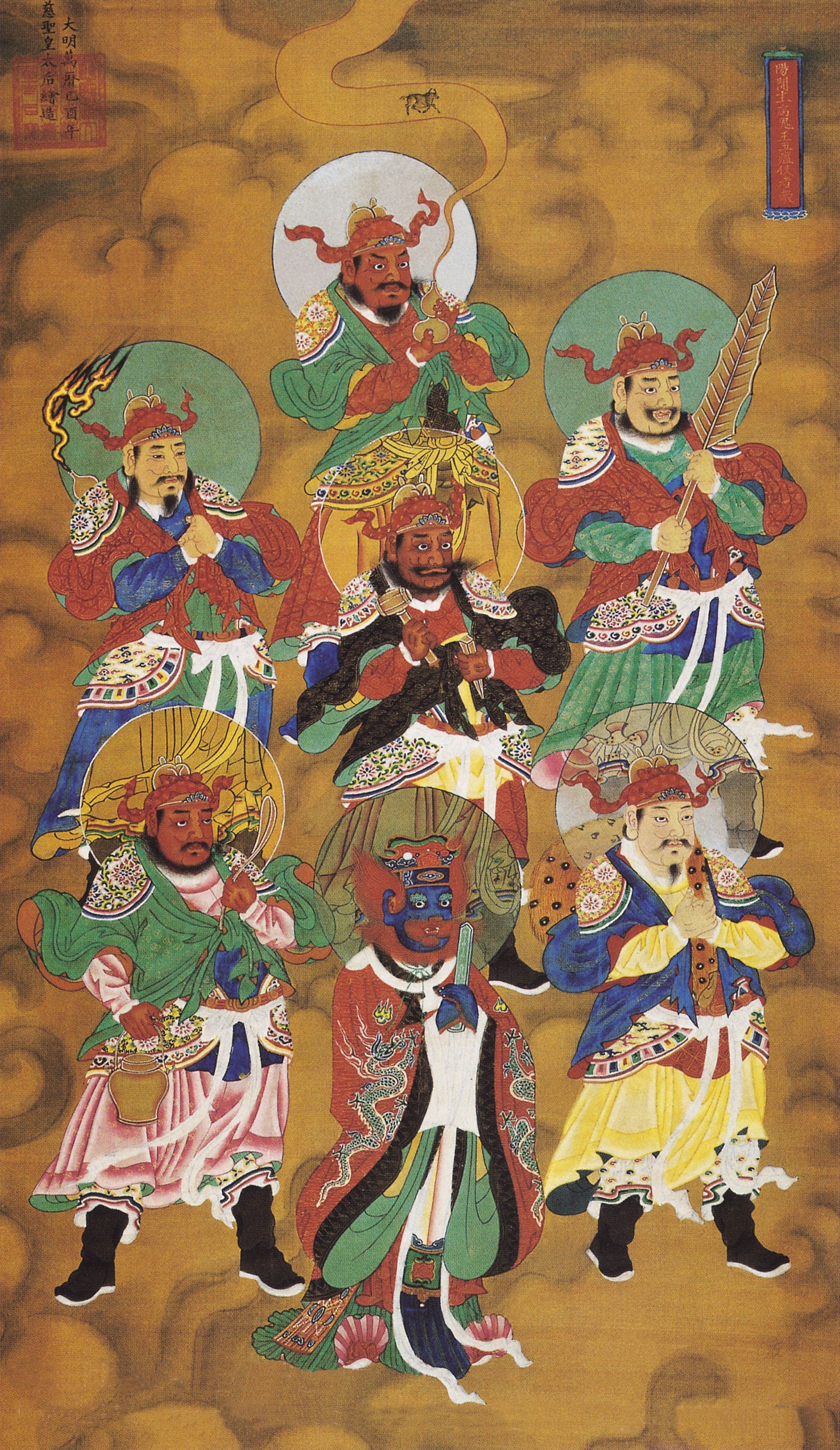
Five Masters of Plague and Ghost and Pestilence King, Qing dynasty

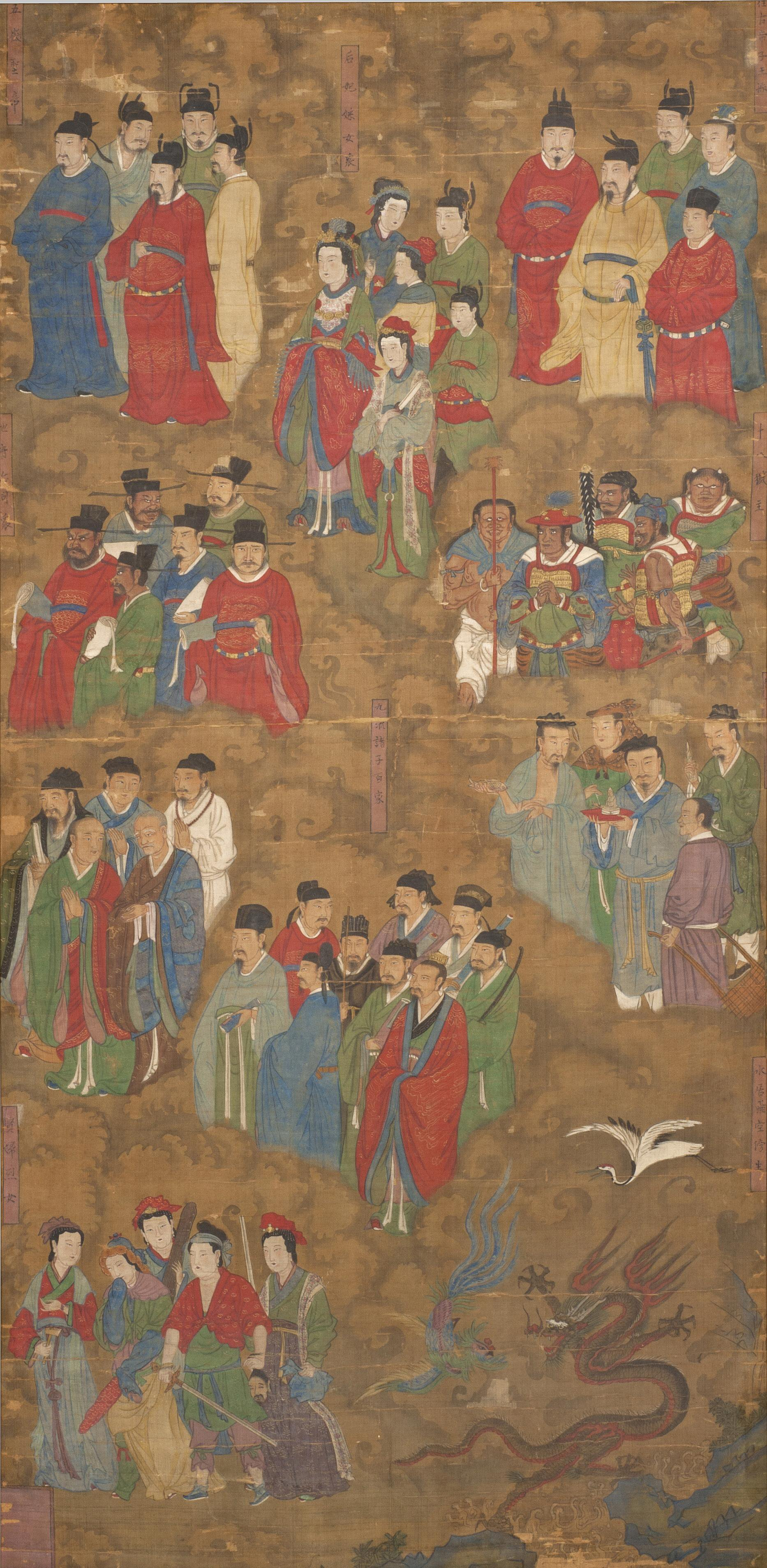
Attendees of the Water-Land Ritual, Qing dynasty

== See also ==
- Buddhist art
- Three teachings
- Chinese folk religion
- Religious Confucianism
- Chinese painting
