= Canshen =

Silk deity in Chinese folk religion

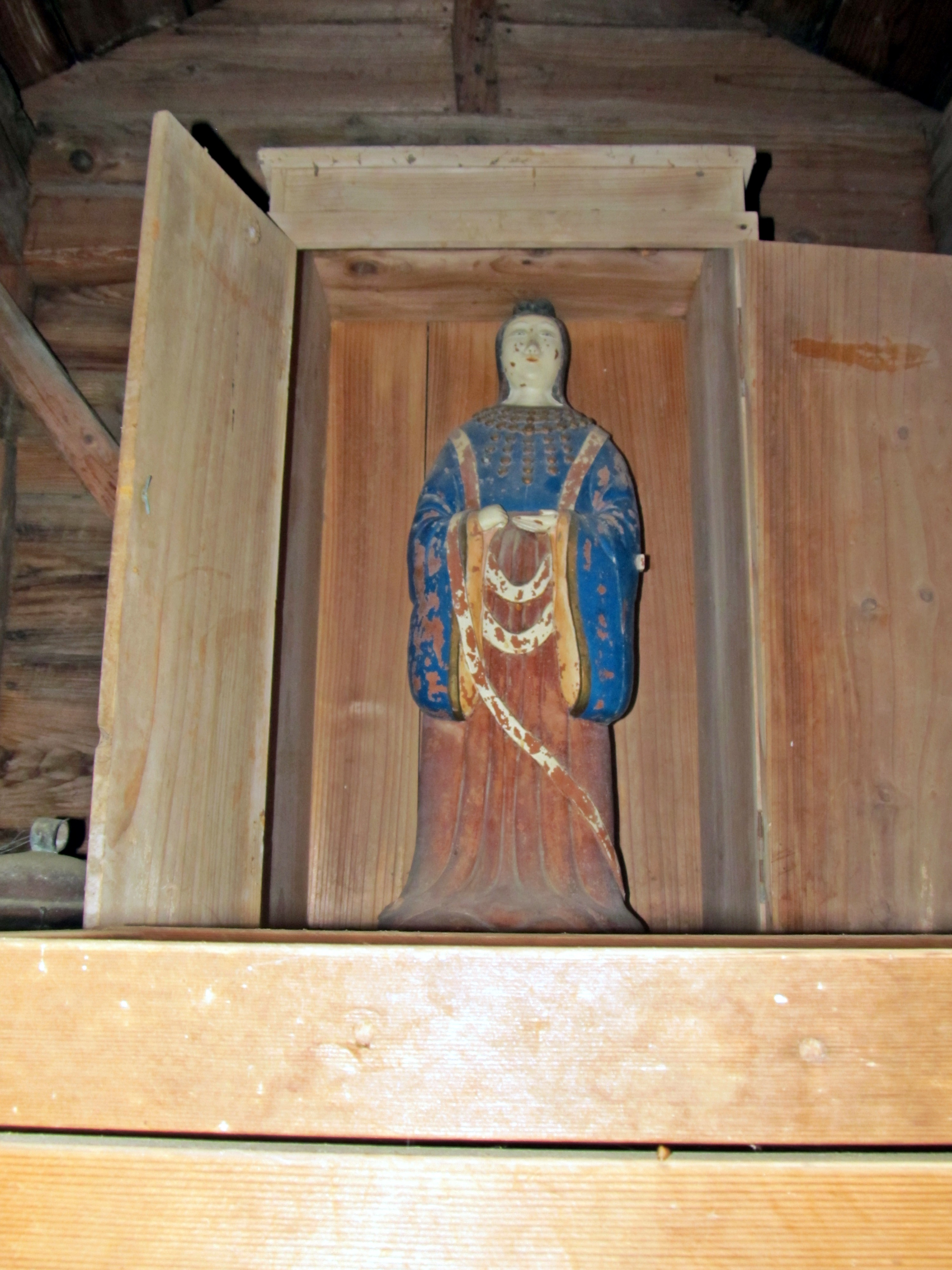
The goddess of silkworms is worshiped at the Sumiyoshi-jinja shrine in Kakuda.

Cánshén (Chinese: 蚕神, "Silkworm God") or Cánwáng (蚕王 "Silkworm Ruler") is the deity of silkworm and sericulture in Chinese religion. There are two main Canshen, who are two deified mytho-historical personalities who contributed to the invention and diffusion of sericulture in China.

- Cánmǔ (蚕母, the "Silkworm Mother"), is a goddess whose cult is related to that of Houtu (the "Queen of the Earth") and to that of the Sanxiao ("Three Skies") goddesses. She is also called Cángū (蚕姑 the "Silkworm Maiden [or Lady]"), and is identified as Léizǔ (嫘祖), the wife of Huangdi, the deity of the centre of the cosmos and god progenitor of all the Chinese. The worship of Canmu is typical of central-northern and eastern China.
- Qīngyīshén (青衣神 the "Bluegreen-Clad God") is the same as Cáncóng (蚕丛 the "Silkworm Twig"), the first ruler and ancestor of the Shu kingdom, and promoter of sericulture among his people. He was worshipped in Sichuan, the modern Chinese province descending from the Shu kingdom.

== See also ==
- Chinese gods and immortals
- Chinese folk religion

== Citations ==
=== Sources ===
- Jones, Stephen (2013). In Search of the Folk Daoists of North China. Ashgate Publishing. ISBN 978-1409481300.
- Fan, Lizhu (2003). "The Cult of the Silkworm Mother as a Core of Local Community Religion in a North China Village: Field Study in Zhiwuying, Boarding, Hebei". The China Quarterly. 174. Cambridge University Press: 359–372. doi:10.1017/S0009443903000226.
