= Tao =

Philosophical concept native to China

Chinese name
- Chinese: 道
- Literal meaning: way
Transcriptions
Standard Mandarin
- Hanyu Pinyin: dào
- Bopomofo: ㄉㄠˋ
- Wade–Giles: tao^{4}
- Yale Romanization: dàu
- IPA: [tâʊ]
Wu
- Romanization: doh^{入}
Yue: Cantonese
- Yale Romanization: douh
- Jyutping: dou6
- IPA: [tɔw˨]
Southern Min
- Hokkien POJ: tō
- Tâi-lô: tō
Middle Chinese
- Middle Chinese: dáw

Vietnamese name
- Vietnamese alphabet: đạo
- Chữ Hán: 道

Korean name
- Hangul: 도
- Hanja: 道
Transcriptions
- Revised Romanization: do
- McCune–Reischauer: to

Japanese name
- Kanji: 道
Transcriptions
- Romanization: dō

English name
- English: /daʊ/, DOW /taʊ/, TOW

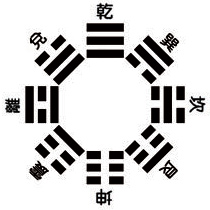
Uncreated Eight Trigrams, representing the uncreated state of a being before it incarnates into the material world

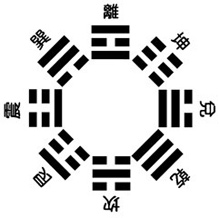
Post-created Eight Trigrams, representing the state of a being after it is born into the material world

The Tao or Dao (Chinese: 道; pinyin: dào; Jyutping: dou6) is the source and fundamental principle of the universe, primarily as conceived in East Asian philosophy and religions. The concept is represented by the Chinese character 道, which means 'way', 'path', and 'road', but philosophically 'doctrine' or 'principle'.

According to its foundational book Tao Te Ching, Tao is self-existent, formless, eternal, omnipresent, and is the source of all existence. While all phenomena in the universe change continuously, Tao, as the source of all, remains motionless and changeless intrinsically:

There is something undifferentiated and yet complete.
Which existed before heaven and earth.
Soundless and formless.
It depends on nothing and does not change.
It operates everywhere and is free from danger.
It may be considered the Mother of the universe.
I do not know its name; I call it Tao.

— Chapter 25 of Tao Teh Ching

Tao is also described as invisible, intangible, and beyond intellectual understanding, as it is written in Tao Te Ching:

We look at it, and we do not see it, and we name it 'the Equable.'
We listen to it, and we do not hear it, and we name it 'the Inaudible.'
We try to grasp it, and do not get hold of it, and we name it 'the Subtle.'
With these three qualities, it cannot be made the subject of description;
and hence we blend them together and obtain The One.

— Chapter 14 of Tao Teh Ching

The Tao Te Ching has two parts, the Tao Ching comprising chapters 1–37 and the Te Ching comprising next 44 chapters (38–81). Other chapters of Tao Te Ching, as well as other Taoist scriptures such as Ultra Supreme Elder Lord's Ultra Plainness Scripture, and The Wonderful Scripture on the Constant Purity and Tranquility Spoken by the Ultra Supreme Elder Lord, etc., reiterate that Tao is formless, invisible, omnipresent, and is the source of all.

Based on these descriptions, Tao is considered to be the Absolute Truth independent of any conditions, and the Ultimate Reality behind all phenomena. It is the underlying natural order of the universe whose ultimate essence is difficult to circumscribe because it is non-conceptual yet evident in one's being of aliveness.

== Personification of Tao ==
In Tao Te Ching, Tao is often described as a feminine concept or figure. For example, in some chapters, Tao is described as the Mother of the universe who gives birth to all existence and sustains them, while in some other chapters, the practice of adhering to Tao is called "keeping to the Mother", "keeping to the Feminine" or "being fed by the Mother".

Additionally, some ancient Chinese classics describe a supreme goddess considered an embodiment of Tao, known as Holy Mother the Original Lord (聖母元君), Ultimate One Original Lord (太一元君), Uncreated Original Empress (先天元后), Supreme Original Lord (無上元君), etc. According to the ancient classics, She is the teacher of Yellow Emperor, Lao Tzu and Ninth Heaven Mysterious Goddess (九天玄女).

According to Taoist Scriptures, Ultra Supreme Elder Lord (太上老君) is also an embodiment of Tao, and the historical Lao Tzu is considered an incarnation of him.

== Description and uses of the concept ==
The word "Tao" has a variety of meanings in both the ancient and modern Chinese language. Aside from its purely prosaic use meaning road, channel, path, principle, or similar, the word has acquired a variety of differing and often confusing metaphorical, philosophical, and religious uses. In most belief systems, the word is used symbolically in its sense of "way" as the right or proper way of existence, or in the context of ongoing practices of attainment or of the full coming into being, or the state of enlightenment or spiritual perfection that is the outcome of such practices.

Some scholars make sharp distinctions between the moral or ethical usage of the word "Tao" that is prominent in Confucianism and religious Taoism and the more metaphysical usage of the term used in philosophical Taoism and most forms of Mahayana Buddhism; others maintain that these are not separate usages or meanings, seeing them as mutually inclusive and compatible approaches to defining the principle.

Conventionally used to refer to something that cannot otherwise be discussed in words, the term was originally used as a form of praxis rather than theory. Early writings such as the Tao Te Ching and I Ching are careful to distinguish between conceptions of the Tao (sometimes referred to as "named Tao") and the Tao itself (the "unnamed Tao"), which cannot be expressed or understood in language. (Note: Tao Te Ching, Chapter 1. "It is from the unnamed Tao That Heaven and Earth sprang; The named is but The Mother of the ten thousand creatures.") (Note: I Ching, Ta Chuan (Great Treatise). "The kind man discovers it and calls it kind; the wise man discovers it and calls it wise; the common people use it every day and are not aware of it.") Liu Da asserts that the Tao is properly understood as an experiential and evolving concept and that there are not only cultural and religious differences in the interpretation of the Tao but personal differences that reflect the character of individual practitioners.

The Tao can be roughly thought of as the "flow of the universe", or as some essence or pattern behind the natural world that keeps the Universe balanced and ordered. It is related to qi, the essential energy of action and existence. The Tao is a non-dualistic principle—it is the greater whole from which all the individual elements of the Universe derive. Catherine Keller considers it similar to the negative theology of Western scholars, but the Tao is rarely an object of direct worship, being treated more like the Hindu concepts of karma, dharma, or Ṛta than as a divine object. The Tao is more commonly expressed in the relationship between wu (void or emptiness, in the sense of wuji) and the natural, dynamic balance between opposites, leading to its central principle of wu wei (inaction or inexertion).

道貫三才為一炁耳。天以氣而運行，地以氣而發生，陰陽以炁而慘舒，風雷以炁而動蕩，人身以炁而呼吸，道法以炁而感通。 用將元神自靈，製邪則鬼神自伏。

The Dao pervades the Three Realms—Heaven, Earth, and Humanity—as a single qi. By this qi the heavens revolve, the earth brings forth life, yin and yang ebb and flow, wind and thunder surge and subside. Humans draw breath through qi, Daoist rites communicate through qi. When the Original Spirit shines of itself, evil is quelled and demons bow in submission.

— Daofa Huiyuan, Qingwei Daofa Shuniu, collected in Daozang vol. 28

The Tao is usually described in terms of elements of nature, and in particular, as similar to water. Like water it is undifferentiated, endlessly self-replenishing, soft and quiet but immensely powerful, and impassively generous. (Note: Water is soft and flexible, yet possesses an immense power to overcome obstacles and alter landscapes, even carving canyons with its slow and steady persistence. It is viewed as a reflection of, or close in action to, the Tao. The Tao is often expressed as a sea or flood that cannot be dammed or denied. It flows around and over obstacles like water, setting an example for those who wish to live in accord with it.) The Song dynasty painter Chen Rong popularized the analogy with his painting Nine Dragons.

Much of Taoist philosophy centers on the cyclical continuity of the natural world and its contrast to the linear, goal-oriented actions of human beings, as well as the perception that the Tao is "the source of all being, in which life and death are the same."

In all its uses, the Tao is considered to have ineffable qualities that prevent it from being defined or expressed in words. It can, however, be known or experienced, and its principles (which can be discerned by observing nature) can be followed or practiced. Much of East Asian philosophical writing focuses on the value of adhering to the principles of the Tao and the various consequences of failing to do so.

The Eight Trigrams, a system commonly used to represent Tao and its pursuit

The Tao was shared with Confucianism, Chan Buddhism and Zen, and more broadly throughout East Asian philosophy and religion in general. In Taoism, Chinese Buddhism, and Confucianism, the object of spiritual practice is to "become one with the Tao" (Tao Te Ching) or to harmonize one's will with nature to achieve 'effortless action'. This involves meditative and moral practices. Important in this respect is the Taoist concept of de ('virtue'). In Confucianism and religious forms of Taoism, these are often explicitly moral/ethical arguments about proper behavior, while Buddhism and more philosophical forms of Taoism usually refer to the natural and mercurial outcomes of action (comparable to karma). The Tao is intrinsically related to the concepts of yin and yang, where every action creates counter-actions as unavoidable movements within manifestations of the Tao, and proper practice variously involves accepting, conforming to, or working with these natural developments.

In Taoism and Confucianism, the Tao was sometimes traditionally seen as a "transcendent power that blesses" that can "express itself directly" through various ways, but most often shows itself through the speech, movement, or traditional ritual of a "prophet, priest, or king." Tao can serve as a life energy instead of qi in some Taoist belief systems.

=== De ===
De (德; 'power'', ''virtue'', ''integrity') is the term generally used to refer to proper adherence to the Tao. De is the active living or cultivation of the way. Particular things (things with names) that manifest from the Tao have their own inner nature that they follow in accordance with the Tao, and the following of this inner nature is De. Wu wei, or 'naturalness', is contingent on understanding and conforming to this inner nature, which is interpreted variously from a personal, individual nature to a more generalized notion of human nature within the greater Universe.

Historically, the concept of De differed significantly between Taoists and Confucianists. Confucianism was largely a moral system emphasizing the values of humaneness, righteousness, and filial duty, and so conceived De in terms of obedience to rigorously defined and codified social rules. Taoists took a broader, more naturalistic, more metaphysical view on the relationship between humankind and the Universe and considered social rules to be at best a derivative reflection of the natural and spontaneous interactions between people and at worst calcified structure that inhibited naturalness and created conflict. This led to some philosophical and political conflicts between Taoists and Confucians. Several sections of the works attributed to Zhuang Zhou are dedicated to critiques of the failures of Confucianism.

== Interpretations ==
=== Taoism ===
The translator Arthur Waley observed that:

[Tao] means a road, path, way; and hence, the way in which one does something; method, doctrine, principle. The Way of Heaven, for example, is ruthless; when autumn comes 'no leaf is spared because of its beauty, no flower because of its fragrance'. The Way of Man means, among other things, procreation; and eunuchs are said to be 'far from the Way of Man'. Chu Tao is 'the way to be a monarch', i.e. the art of ruling. Each school of philosophy has its tao, its doctrine of the way in which life should be ordered. Finally in a particular school of philosophy whose followers came to be called Taoists, tao meant 'the way the universe works'; and ultimately something very like God, in the more abstract and philosophical sense of that term.

"Tao" gives Taoism its name in English, in both its philosophical and religious forms. The Tao is the fundamental and central concept of these schools of thought. Taoism perceives the Tao as a natural order underlying the substance and activity of the Universe. Language and the "naming" of the Tao is regarded negatively in Taoism; the Tao fundamentally exists and operates outside the realm of differentiation and linguistic constraints.

There is no single orthodox Taoist view of the Tao. All forms of Taoism center around Tao and De, but there is a broad variety of distinct interpretations among sects and even individuals in the same sect. Despite this diversity, there are some clear, common patterns and trends in Taoism and its branches.

The diversity of Taoist interpretations of the Tao can be seen across four texts representative of major streams of thought in Taoism. All four texts are used in modern Taoism with varying acceptance and emphasis among sects. The Tao Te Ching is the oldest text and representative of a speculative and philosophical approach to the Tao. The Daotilun is an eighth century exegesis of the Tao Te Ching, written from a well-educated and religious viewpoint that represents the traditional, scholarly perspective. The devotional perspective of the Tao is expressed in the Qingjing Jing, a liturgical text that was originally composed during the Han dynasty and is used as a hymnal in religious Taoism, especially among eremites. The Zhuangzi uses literary devices such as tales, allegories, and narratives to relate the Tao to the reader, illustrating a metaphorical method of viewing and expressing the Tao.

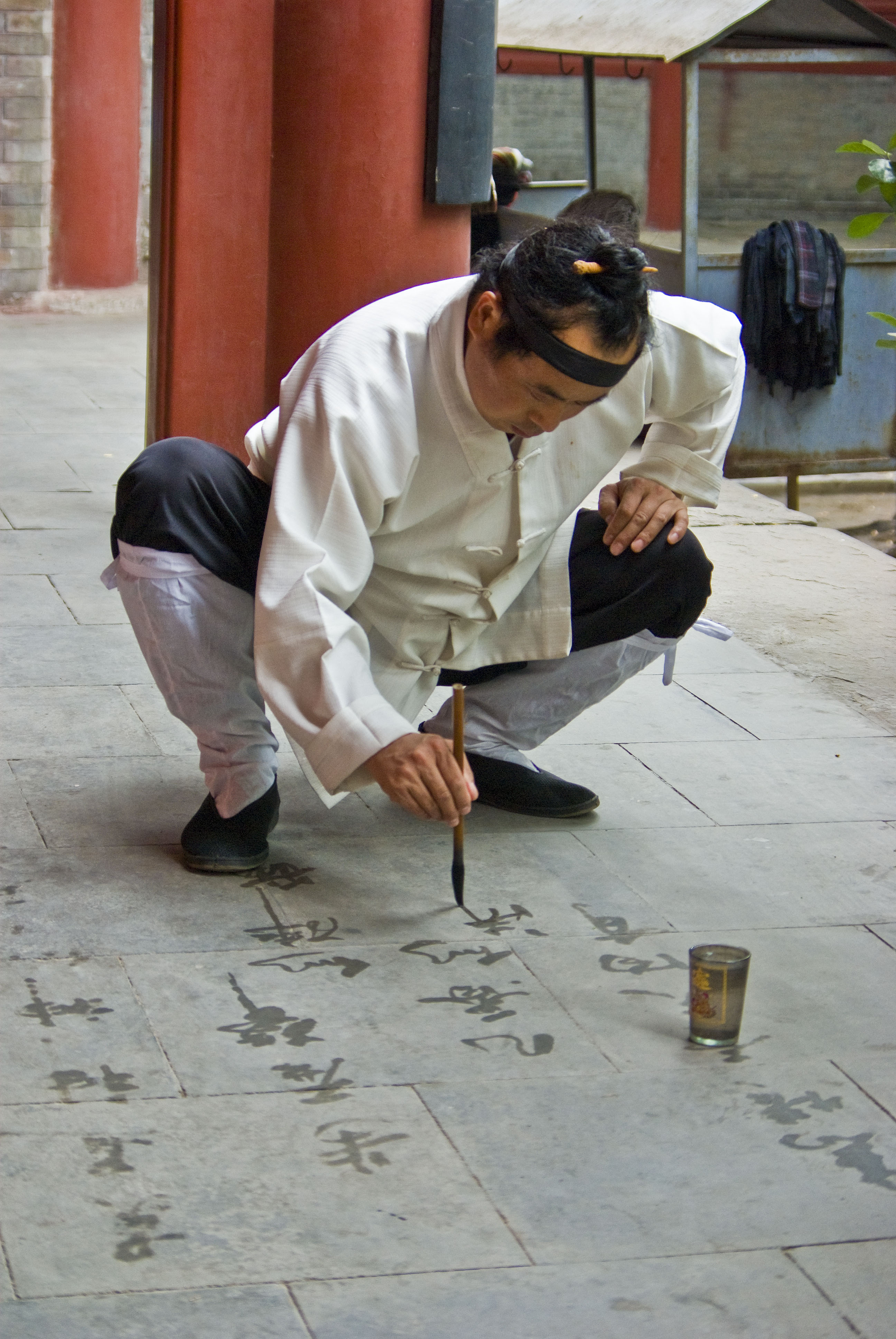
A Taoist monk practicing calligraphy with water on stone. Water calligraphy, like sand mandalas, evokes the ephemeral nature of physical reality.

The forms and variations of religious Taoism are incredibly diverse. They integrate a broad spectrum of academic, ritualistic, supernatural, devotional, literary, and folk practices with a multitude of results. Buddhism and Confucianism particularly affected the way many sects of Taoism framed, approached, and perceived the Tao. The multitudinous branches of religious Taoism accordingly regard the Tao, and interpret writings about it, in innumerable ways. Thus, outside of a few broad similarities, it is difficult to provide an accurate yet clear summary of their interpretation of the Tao.

A central tenet in most varieties of religious Taoism is that the Tao is ever-present, but must be manifested, cultivated, and/or perfected to be realized. It is the source of the Universe, and the seed of its primordial purity resides in all things. Breathing exercises, according to some Taoists, allowed one to absorb "parts of the universe." Incense and certain minerals were seen as representing the greater universe as well, and breathing them in could create similar effects. The manifestation of the Tao is de, which rectifies and invigorates the world with the Tao's radiance.

Alternatively, philosophical Taoism regards the Tao as a non-religious concept; it is not a deity to be worshiped, nor is it a mystical Absolute in the religious sense of the Hindu brahman. Joseph Wu remarked of this conception of the Tao, "Dao is not religiously available; nor is it even religiously relevant." The writings of Laozi and Zhuangzi are tinged with esoteric tones and approach humanism and naturalism as paradoxes. In contrast to the esotericism typically found in religious systems, the Tao is not transcendent to the self, nor is mystical attainment an escape from the world in philosophical Taoism. The self steeped in the Tao is the self grounded in its place within the natural Universe. A person dwelling within the Tao excels in themselves and their activities.

However, this distinction is complicated by hermeneutic difficulties in the categorization of Taoist schools, sects, and movements.

Some Taoists believe the Tao is an entity that can "take on human form" to perform its goals.

The Tao represents human harmony with the universe and even more phenomena in the world and nature.

=== Confucianism ===
The Tao of Confucius can be translated as 'truth'. Confucianism regards the Way, or Truth, as concordant with a particular approach to life, politics, and tradition. It is held as equally necessary and well regarded as de and ren ('compassion', 'humanity'). Confucius presents a humanistic Tao. He only rarely speaks of the 'Way of Heaven'. The early Confucian philosopher Xunzi explicitly noted this contrast. Though he acknowledged the existence and celestial importance of the Way of Heaven, he insisted that the Tao principally concerns human affairs.

As a formal religious concept in Confucianism, Tao is the Absolute toward which the faithful move. In Zhongyong (The Doctrine of the Mean), harmony with the Absolute is the equivalent to integrity and sincerity. The Great Learning expands on this concept explaining that the Way illuminates virtue, improves the people, and resides within the purest morality. During the Tang dynasty, Han Yu further formalized and defined Confucian beliefs as an apologetic response to Buddhism. He emphasized the ethics of the Way. He explicitly paired "Tao" and "De", focusing on humane nature and righteousness. He also framed and elaborated on a "tradition of the Tao" in order to reject the traditions of Buddhism.

Ancestors and the Mandate of Heaven were thought to emanate from the Tao, especially during the Song dynasty.

=== Buddhism ===
Buddhism first started to spread in China during the first century AD and was experiencing a golden age of growth and maturation by the fourth century AD. Hundreds of collections of Pali and Sanskrit texts were translated into Chinese by Buddhist monks within a short period of time. Dhyana was translated as 禅; chán, and later as "zen", giving Zen Buddhism its name. The use of Chinese concepts, such as the Tao, that were close to Buddhist ideas and terms helped spread the religion and make it more amenable to the Chinese people. However, the differences between the Sanskrit and Chinese terminology led to some initial misunderstandings and the eventual development of Buddhism in East Asia as a distinct entity. As part of this process, many Chinese words introduced their rich semantic and philosophical associations into Buddhism, including the use of "Tao" for central concepts and tenets of Buddhism.

Pai-chang Huai-hai told a student who was grappling with difficult portions of suttas, "Take up words in order to manifest meaning and you'll obtain 'meaning'. Cut off words and meaning is emptiness. Emptiness is the Tao. The Tao is cutting off words and speech." Zen Buddhists regard the Tao as synonymous with both the Buddhist Path and the results of it, the Noble Eightfold Path and Buddhist enlightenment. Pai-chang's statement plays upon this usage in the context of the fluid and varied Chinese usage of "Tao". Words and meanings are used to refer to rituals and practices. The "emptiness" refers to the Buddhist concept of sunyata. Finding the Tao and Buddha-nature is not simply a matter of formulations, but an active response to the Four Noble Truths that cannot be fully expressed or conveyed in words and concrete associations. The use of "Tao" in this context refers to the literal "way" of Buddhism, the return to the universal source, dharma, proper meditation, and nirvana, among other associations. "Tao" is commonly used in this fashion by Chinese Buddhists, heavy with associations and nuanced meanings.

=== Neo-Confucianism ===
During the Song dynasty, neo-Confucians regarded the Tao as the purest thing-in-itself. Shao Yong regarded the Tao as the origin of heaven, earth, and everything within them. In contrast, Zhang Zai presented a vitalistic Tao that was the fundamental component or effect of qi, the motive energy behind life and the world. A number of later scholars adopted this interpretation, such as Tai Chen during the Qing dynasty.

Zhu Xi, Cheng Ho, and Cheng Yi perceived the Tao in the context of li ('principle') and t'ien li ('principle of Heaven'). Cheng Hao regarded the fundamental matter of li, and thus the Tao, to be humaneness. Developing compassion, altruism, and other humane virtues is following of the Way. Cheng Yi followed this interpretation, elaborating on this perspective of the Tao through teachings about interactions between yin and yang, the cultivation and preservation of life, and the axiom of a morally just universe.

On the whole, the Tao is equated with totality. Wang Fuzhi expressed the Tao as the taiji, or 'great ultimate', as well as the road leading to it. Nothing exists apart from the Principle of Heaven in Neo-Confucianism. The Way is contained within all things. Thus, the religious life is not an elite or special journey for Neo-Confucians. The normal, mundane life is the path that leads to the Absolute, because the Absolute is contained within the mundane objects and events of daily life.

=== Chinese folklore ===
Yayu, the son of Zhulong who was reincarnated on Earth as a violent hybrid between a bull, a tiger, and a dragon, was allowed to go to an afterlife that was known as "the place beyond the Tao". This shows that some Chinese folk storytelling and mythological traditions had very differing interpretations of the Tao between each other and orthodox religious practices.

=== Christianity ===
Noted Christian author C.S. Lewis used the word Tao to describe "the doctrine of objective value, the belief that certain attitudes are really true, and others really false, the kind of thing the Universe is and the kind of things we are." He asserted that every religion and philosophy contains foundations of universal ethics as an attempt to line up with the Tao—the way mankind was designed to be. In Lewis's thinking, God created the Tao and fully displayed it through the person of Jesus Christ.

Similarly, Eastern Orthodox hegumen Damascene (Christensen), a pupil of noted monastic and scholar of East Asian religions Seraphim Rose, identified logos with the Tao. Damascene published a full commented translation of the Tao Te Ching under the title Christ the Eternal Tao.

In some Chinese translations of the New Testament, the word λόγος (logos) is translated as 道, in passages such as John 1:1, indicating that the translators considered the concept of Tao to be somewhat equivalent to the Hellenic concept of logos in Platonism and Christianity.

== Linguistic aspects ==
The Chinese character 道 is highly polysemous: its historical alternate pronunciation as dǎo possessed an additional connotation of 'guide'. The history of the character includes details of orthography and semantics, as well as a possible Proto-Indo-European etymology, in addition to more recent loaning into English and other world languages.

=== Orthography ===
Bronze script

Chu slip and silk script

Large seal script

Small seal script

"Tao" is written with the Chinese character 道 using both traditional and simplified characters. The traditional graphical interpretation of 道 dates back to the Shuowen Jiezi dictionary published in 121 CE, which describes it as a rare "compound ideogram" or "ideographic compound". According to the Shuowen Jiezi, 道 combines the 'go' radical 辶 (a variant of 辵) with 首; 'head'. This construction signified a "head going" or "leading the way".

"Tao" is graphically distinguished between its earliest nominal meaning of 'way', 'road', 'path', and the later verbal sense of 'say'. It should also be contrasted with 導; 'lead the way'', ''guide'', ''conduct'', ''direct'. The simplified character 导 for 導 has 巳; '6th of the 12 Earthly Branches' in place of 道.

The earliest written forms of "Tao" are bronzeware script and seal script characters from the Zhou dynasty (1045–256 BCE) bronzes and writings. These ancient forms more clearly depict the 首; 'head' element as hair above a face. Some variants interchange the 'go' radical 辵 with 行; 'go'', ''road', with the original bronze "crossroads" depiction written in the seal character with two 彳 and 亍; 'footprints'.

Bronze scripts for 道 occasionally include an element of 手; 'hand' or 寸; 'thumb'', ''hand', which occurs in 導; 'lead'. The linguist Peter A. Boodberg explained,

This "tao with the hand element" is usually identified with the modern character 導 tao < d'ôg, 'to lead', 'guide', 'conduct', and considered to be a derivative or verbal cognate of the noun tao, "way," "path." The evidence just summarized would indicate rather that "tao with the hand" is but a variant of the basic tao and that the word itself combined both nominal and verbal aspects of the etymon. This is supported by textual examples of the use of the primary tao in the verbal sense "to lead" (e. g., Analects 1.5; 2.8) and seriously undermines the unspoken assumption implied in the common translation of Tao as "way" that the concept is essentially a nominal one. Tao would seem, then, to be etymologically a more dynamic concept than we have made it translation-wise. It would be more appropriately rendered by "lead way" and "lode" ("way," "course," "journey," "leading," "guidance"; cf. "lodestone" and "lodestar"), the somewhat obsolescent deverbal noun from "to lead."

These Confucian Analects citations of dao verbally meaning 'to guide', 'to lead' are: "The Master said, 'In guiding a state of a thousand chariots, approach your duties with reverence and be trustworthy in what you say" and "The Master said, 'Guide them by edicts, keep them in line with punishments, and the common people will stay out of trouble but will have no sense of shame."

=== Phonology ===
In modern Standard Chinese, 道's two primary pronunciations are tonally differentiated between falling tone dào; 'way', 'path' and dipping tone dǎo; 'guide', 'lead' (usually written as 導).

Besides the common specifications 道; dào; 'way' and 道; dǎo (with variant 導; 'guide'), 道 has a rare additional pronunciation with the level tone, dāo, seen in the regional chengyu 神神道道; shénshendāodāo; 'odd', 'bizarre', a reduplication of 道 and 神; shén; 'spirit', 'god' from northeast China.

In Middle Chinese (c. 6th–10th centuries CE) tone name categories, 道 and 導 were 去聲; qùshēng; 'departing tone' and 上聲; shǎngshēng; 'rising tone'. Historical linguists have reconstructed MC 道; 'way' and 導; 'guide' as d'âu- and d'âu (Bernhard Karlgren), dau and dau daw^{'} and daw^{h}, daw^{X} and daws (William H. Baxter), and dâu^{B} and dâu^{C}.

In Old Chinese (c. 7th–3rd centuries BCE) pronunciations, reconstructions for 道 and 導 are *d'ôg (Karlgren), *dəw (Zhou), *dəgwx and *dəgwh, *luʔ, and *lûʔ and *lûh.

=== Semantics ===
The word 道 has many meanings. For example, the Hanyu Da Zidian dictionary defines 39 meanings for 道; dào and 6 for 道; dǎo.

John DeFrancis's Chinese-English dictionary gives twelve meanings for 道; dào, three for 道; dǎo, and one for 道; dāo. Note that brackets clarify abbreviations and ellipsis marks omitted usage examples.

^{2}dào 道 N. [noun] road; path ◆M. [nominal measure word] ① (for rivers/topics/etc.) ② (for a course (of food); a streak (of light); etc.) ◆V. [verb] ① say; speak; talk (introducing direct quote, novel style) ... ② think; suppose ◆B.F. [bound form, bound morpheme] ① channel ② way; reason; principle ③ doctrine ④ Daoism ⑤ line ⑥〈hist.〉 [history] ⑦ district; circuit canal; passage; tube ⑧ say (polite words) ... See also ^{4}dǎo, ^{4}dāo

^{4}dǎo 导/道[導/- B.F. [bound form] ① guide; lead ... ② transmit; conduct ... ③ instruct; direct ...

^{4}dāo 道 in shénshendāodāo ... 神神道道 R.F. [reduplicated form] 〈topo.〉[non-Mandarin form] odd; fantastic; bizarre

Dao, starting from the Song dynasty, also referred to an ideal in Chinese landscape paintings that artists sought to live up to by portraying "nature scenes" that reflected "the harmony of man with his surroundings."

=== Etymology ===
The etymological linguistic origins of dao "way; path" depend upon its Old Chinese pronunciation, which scholars have tentatively reconstructed as *d'ôg, *dəgwx, *dəw, *luʔ, and *lûʔ.

Boodberg noted that the shou 首 "head" phonetic in the dao 道 character was not merely phonetic but "etymonic", analogous with English to head meaning "to lead" and "to tend in a certain direction," "ahead," "headway".

Paronomastically, tao is equated with its homonym 蹈 tao < d'ôg, "to trample," "tread," and from that point of view it is nothing more than a "treadway," "headtread," or "foretread "; it is also occasionally associated with a near synonym (and possible cognate) 迪 ti < d'iôk, "follow a road," "go along," "lead," "direct"; "pursue the right path"; a term with definite ethical overtones and a graph with an exceedingly interesting phonetic, 由 yu < djôg," "to proceed from." The reappearance of C162 [辶] "walk" in ti with the support of C157 [⻊] "foot" in tao, "to trample," "tread," should perhaps serve us as a warning not to overemphasize the headworking functions implied in tao in preference to those of the lower extremities.

Victor H. Mair proposes a connection with Proto-Indo-European drogh, supported by numerous cognates in Indo-European languages, as well as semantically similar Semitic Arabic and Hebrew words.

The archaic pronunciation of Tao sounded approximately like drog or dorg. This links it to the Proto-Indo-European root drogh (to run along) and Indo-European dhorg (way, movement). Related words in a few modern Indo-European languages are Russian doroga (way, road), Polish droga (way, road), Czech dráha (way, track), Serbo-Croatian draga (path through a valley), and Norwegian dialect drog (trail of animals; valley). .... The nearest Sanskrit (Old Indian) cognates to Tao (drog) are dhrajas (course, motion) and dhraj (course). The most closely related English words are "track" and "trek", while "trail" and "tract" are derived from other cognate Indo-European roots. Following the Way, then, is like going on a cosmic trek. Even more unexpected than the panoply of Indo-European cognates for Tao (drog) is the Hebrew root d-r-g for the same word and Arabic t-r-q, which yields words meaning "track, path, way, way of doing things" and is important in Islamic philosophical discourse.

Axel Schuessler's etymological dictionary presents two possibilities for the tonal morphology of dào 道 "road; way; method" < Middle Chinese dâu^{B} < Old Chinese *lûʔ and dào 道 or 導 "to go along; bring along; conduct; explain; talk about" < Middle dâu^{C} < Old *lûh. Either dào 道 "the thing which is doing the conducting" is a Tone B (shangsheng 上聲 "rising tone") "endoactive noun" derivation from dào 導 "conduct", or dào 導 is a Later Old Chinese (Warring States period) "general tone C" (qusheng 去聲 "departing tone") derivation from dào 道 "way". For a possible etymological connection, Schuessler notes the ancient Fangyan dictionary defines yu < *lokh 裕 and lu < *lu 猷 as Eastern Qi State dialectal words meaning dào < *lûʔ 道 "road".

=== Other languages ===
Many languages have borrowed and adapted "Tao" as a loanword.

In Chinese, this character 道 is pronounced as Cantonese dou6 and Hokkian to7. In Sino-Xenic languages, 道 is pronounced as Japanese dō, tō, or michi; Korean do or to; and Vietnamese đạo.

Since 1982, when the International Organization for Standardization adopted Pinyin as the standard romanization of Chinese, many Western languages have changed from spelling this loanword tao in national systems (e.g., French EFEO Chinese transcription and English Wade–Giles) to dao in Pinyin.

The tao/dao "the way" English word of Chinese origin has three meanings, according to the Oxford English Dictionary.

1. a. In Taoism, an absolute entity which is the source of the universe; the way in which this absolute entity functions.

1. b. = Taoism, taoist

2. In Confucianism and in extended uses, the way to be followed, the right conduct; doctrine or method.

The earliest recorded usages were Tao (1736), Tau (1747), Taou (1831), and Dao (1971).

The term "Taoist priest" (道士; Dàoshì), was used already by the Jesuits Matteo Ricci and Nicolas Trigault in their De Christiana expeditione apud Sinas, rendered as Tausu in the original Latin edition (1615), (Note: De Christiana expeditione apud Sinas suscepta ab Societate Jesu, Book One, Chapter 10, p. 125. Quote: "sectarii quidam Tausu vocant". Chinese gloss in Pasquale M. d' Elia, Matteo Ricci. Fonti ricciane: documenti originali concernenti Matteo Ricci e la storia delle prime relazioni tra l'Europa e la Cina (1579-1615), Libreria dello Stato, 1942; can be found by searching for "tausu". Louis J. Gallagher (China in the Sixteenth Century: The Journals of Matteo Ricci; 1953), apparently has a typo (Taufu instead of Tausu) in the text of his translation of this line (p. 102), and Tausi in the index (p. 615)) and Tausa in an early English translation published by Samuel Purchas (1625). (Note: A discourse of the Kingdome of China, taken out of Ricius and Trigautius, containing the countrey, people, government, religion, rites, sects, characters, studies, arts, acts; and a Map of China added, drawne out of one there made with Annotations for the understanding thereof (excerpts from De Christiana expeditione apud Sinas, in English translation) in Purchas his Pilgrimes, Volume XII, p. 461 (1625). Quote: "... Lauzu ... left no Bookes of his Opinion, nor seemes to have intended any new Sect, but certaine Sectaries, called Tausa, made him the head of their sect after his death..." Can be found in the full text of "Hakluytus posthumus" on archive.org.)

== See also ==
- Tathātā
- Holy Wisdom
- Ātman (Hinduism)
- Actionlessness (無爲)
- Asha
- Brahman
- Absolute (philosophy)
- Nu (mythology)
- Orenda
- Wuji (philosophy)
- Manitou
- Teotl
- Logos (Christianity)
- Logos
