= Nine Dragons (painting) =

1244 handscroll by Chen Rong

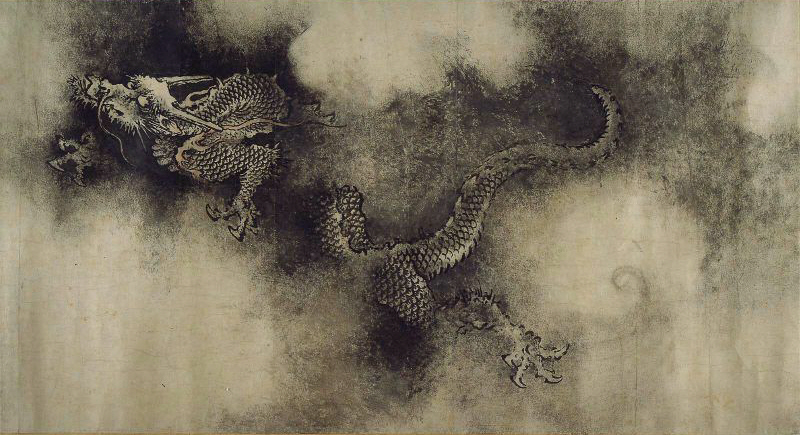
- Detail: One of the dragons from the scroll
- Artist: Chen Rong
- Year: 1244
- Type: Ink and color on Xuan paper
- Dimensions: 46.3 cm × 1496.4 cm (18.2 in × 589.1 in)
- Location: Museum of Fine Arts, Boston, Boston

Nine Dragons (九龍圖卷; Jiǔlóngtú juǎn) is a handscroll painting by Chinese artist Chen Rong. Painted in 1244, it depicts the apparitions of dragons soaring amidst clouds, mists, whirlpools, rocky mountains and fire, the painting refers to the dynamic forces of nature in Daoism and the liquid, water-like essence of the Tao. The depicted dragons are associated with nine sons of the Dragon King, while the number nine itself is considered auspicious in Chinese astrology and folk beliefs.

Areas of the painting are spattered with drops of ink, either flung or blown onto the surface in a manner similar to action painting. This is a conscious evocation of rain and may even be a rainmaking ritual by the artist; lines 32 and 33 of Chen Rong's poetic inscription describe how his dragons either could, or did, produce rainfall:

In the world people longed for sustained rain.

Suoweng [that is, I] sketched forth Nine Dragons

The painting features multiple inscriptions and stamps. The left side features various colophons, including those by Zhang Sicheng and Dong Sixue, a Song dynasty official. Two inscriptions on the painting were made by the artist's own hand. The dating is based on one of them. According to the inscription placed at the end of the painting, the work was inspired by two other paintings, Cao Ba's Nine Horses and Nine Deers, attributed to Huichong. A later inscription by the Qianlong Emperor says that besides praising Chen Rong's painting, Qianlong ordered a court painter to make a copy of it. Qianlong also impressed several seals on the original painting, whose text appreciates the work.

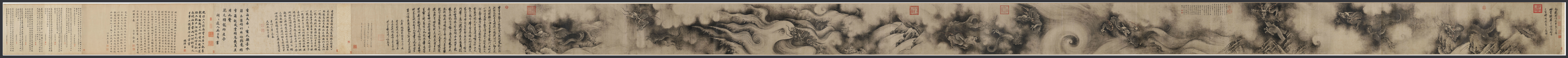
The complete scroll. It is read right to left.

== Provenance ==
In the 17th century, the scroll was in the possession of Geng Zhaozhong (1640–1686) son of Prince Geng Jimao and court attendant to the Shunzhi Emperor. The Qianlong Emperor (1711–1799) passed it to the Jiaqing Emperor (1760–1820) and it was probably given by one of the later Qing emperors to Prince Gong (1833–1898). It was later owned by New York art dealers Yamanaka and Co. who in 1917 sold it to the Museum of Fine Arts Boston for $25,000.
