= Chen Rong (painter) =

Chinese painter and politician

Chen Rong (陳容)
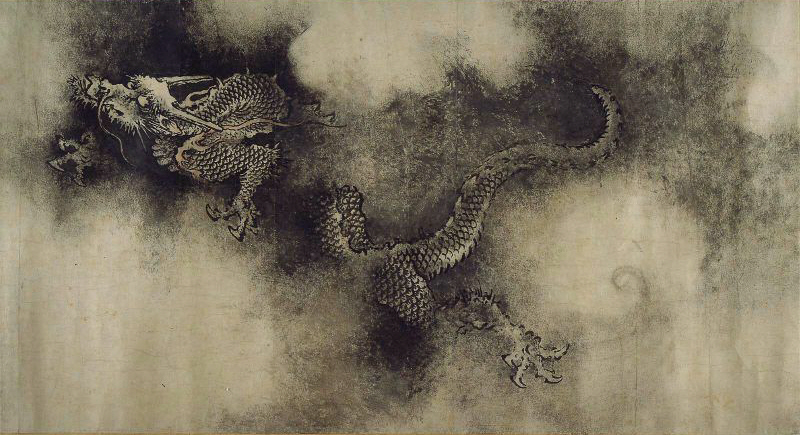
- Nine Dragons handscroll section by Chen Rong, 1244 CE, Chinese Southern Song dynasty at the Museum of Fine Arts, Boston
- Born: 陳容; 1200
- Died: 1266 (aged 65–66)
- Known for: Depictions of dragons
- Notable work: Nine Dragons

Chen Rong (simplified Chinese: 陈容; traditional Chinese: 陳容; pinyin: Chén Róng; Wade–Giles: Ch'en Jung; c. 1200–1266) was a Chinese painter and politician of the Southern Song dynasty celebrated for his depictions of dragons. The Nine Dragons handscroll in the Museum of Fine Arts, Boston, Massachusetts, United States, bearing a date of 1244, is attributed to Chen. The Five Dragons handscroll in the Nelson-Atkins Museum of Art in Kansas City, Missouri, is also attributed to Chen Rong. A longer version of the Five Dragons, also attributed to Chen Rong, is in the Tokyo National Museum. Note that some scholars view the Five Dragons handscroll as the creation of a close follower, and not by Chen.

The Eleven Dragons painting in the Smithsonian's National Museum of Asian Art was formerly attributed to Chen Rong, but now is assigned to the Ming dynasty period. In March 2017, the Six Dragons handscroll, attributed to Chen Rong, was sold by Osaka's Fujita Art Museum at Christie's for almost $49 million.

== Gallery ==
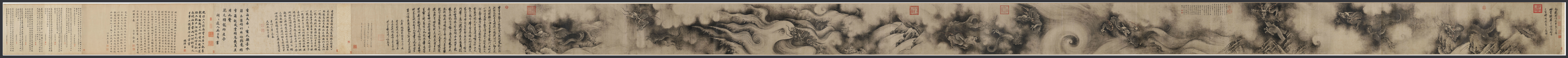
Full handscroll Nine Dragons
