= Rushou =

Chinese mythological figure

Rushou wielding an axe and riding two dragons, depicted in the Classic of Mountains and Seas, 1597 edition

Rushou (Chinese: 蓐收) is a minor deity in Chinese mythology. According to Chinese myths, he was an assistant to the legendary emperor Shaohao and is associated with autumn and the west of China. A Guoyu depicts him with a human face and the paws and white fur of a tiger. He carries an axe and is associated with the element of metal.
