= Chuangshen =

Chinese deity of the bedchamber

Chuángshén (床神, "Bed God") is a deity of the bed and bedroom in Chinese folk religion. The deity may be represented by a male and female pair, Chuángmǔ (床母, "Bed Mother") and Chuánggōng (床公, "Bed Lord"). In Taiwanese folk belief, they protect children and help them grow up healthy.

== Origin ==
According to one legend, a scholar named Guo Hua (郭華) was traveling to take an examination when he met a woman who sold fans. They fell in love, but Guo Hua died suddenly while staying with her. Afraid that others would discover his death, the woman buried his body beneath her bed. She later gave birth to his son. She placed food and wine on the bed as offerings to his spirit. When people asked why, she said she was praying to Chuang Mu to protect her child. Others began to follow this custom.

Other traditions give different origins for Chuang Mu. Some identify her with the Thirty-six Pojie (三十六婆姐), female spirits who serve Zhusheng Niangniang. Another story tells of a woman who dies after childbirth and becomes a spirit who protects her child.

== Worship ==
In Taiwan, Chuang Mu is believed to protect children from birth until they are about 15 or 16 years old. Families place offerings on or beside a child's bed. These may include oil rice, chicken, wine, paper offerings, and Chuang Mu clothing (床母衣). Families may begin worshipping her on the third day after a child's birth. Offerings are also made during festivals, especially Qixi, on the seventh day of the seventh lunar month.

Some people also believe that birthmarks are marks left by Chuang Mu.
