= Yinyanggong =

Taoist deity

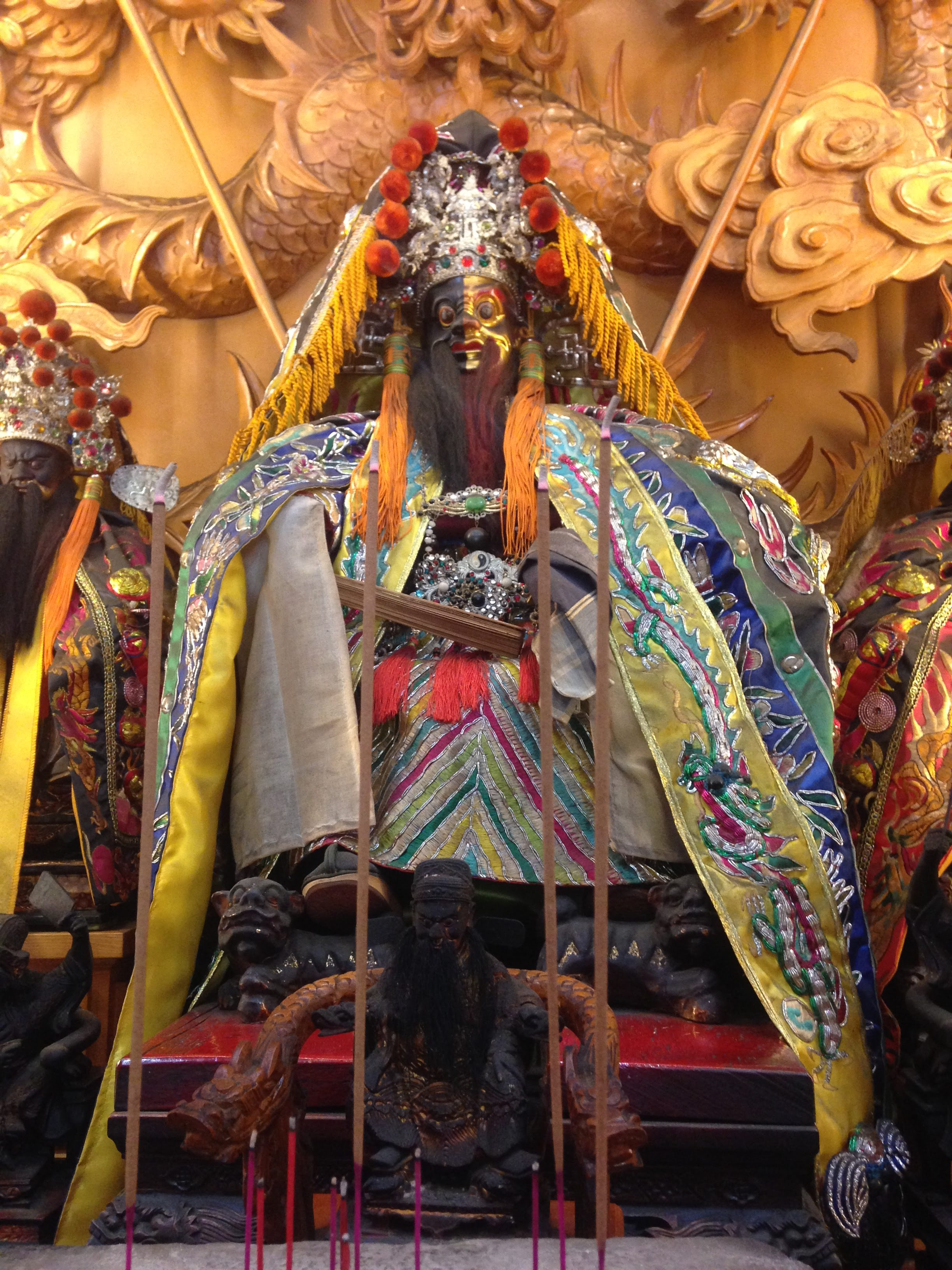
Yinyanggong

Yinyanggong (Chinese: 陰陽公; lit. 'Yinyang Duke'), also known as Yinyangsi (Chinese: 陰陽司; lit. 'Yinyang Controller'), is a Taoist deity and the personification of the union of yin and yang. He often assisted the gods of the underworld such as the Emperor Dongyue, Wufu Emperor, and Lord Chenghuang. Lord Chenghuang regarded Yinyanggong as his first assistant, with whom he could share some of his affairs in the yin and yang world during the busy ghost gate.

== Appearance ==
Yinyanggong has a divided face. The left side is black and the right side is gold or white. This appearance symbolizes his ability to see the realms of yin and yang and make a fair and just judgment based on the distinctions between good and evil.

== Legend ==
Yinyanggong was the general manager of the staff and assistant officials of the Wufu Emperor.

During the period when the Wufu Emperor Temple was to be demolished, Yinyanggong would come out to pose as the Wufu Emperor, so as to help the Wufu Emperor avoid the limelight in order for it not to be destroyed.

== Worship ==
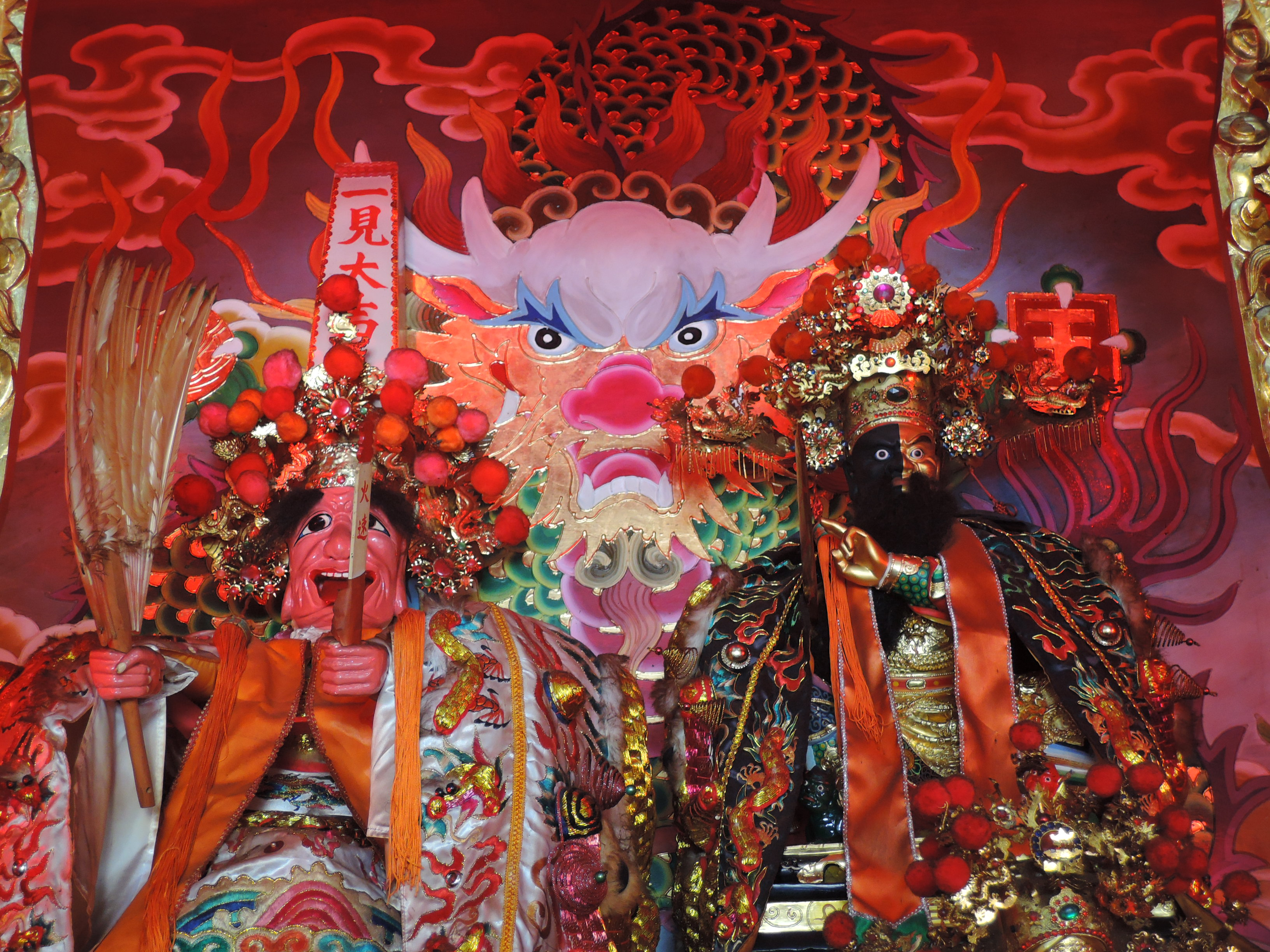
Baiyiji Jishen (left) and Yinyanggong (right) statues in Yinyang Hall

Chenghuang Temples and Wufu Temples are found in many places, but not all have Yinyanggong temples with Yinyanggong as the main deity. In Taiwan, the Kaiji Yinyang Temple enshrined Yinyanggong as the main deity. The temple was built in the 7th year (1827) of Daoguang during the Qing Dynasty.

Except for the Yin Yang Temple in Tainan, where the main worship of Yinyanggong takes place, the only place in Taiwan that has the spirit is the Yin Yang Temple in Magong, Penghu. The Yinyang Hall in Penghu was originally the Youying Temple, dedicated to officials who died childless and the lone souls of men and women who lost their worship during past dynasties. Later, a woman found the Baiyiji Jishen (that is, General Qiye Xie) at the beach. After the enshrinement, the Yinggong Temple which was originally guarded by Yinyanggong was guarded by the Baiyiji Jishen and was renamed, Xianling Temple. Later, the deacons of the temple agreed to bring the body of Yinyang Gongjin from the Kaiji Yinyanggong Temple in Tainan, and the Xianling Temple was renamed Yinyang Hall to worship Baiyi Jishen and Yinyanggong.
