= Holy Mother the Original Lord =

Taoist goddess

Holy Mother the Original Lord (Chinese: 聖母元君) is a Taoist goddess considered the embodiment of Tao. Also known as Ultimate One Original Lord (Chinese: 太一元君), Uncreated Original Empress (Chinese: 先天元后), Supreme Original Lord (Chinese: 無上元君), etc. According to ancient Chinese classics, she is the leader of divine immortals, and is the teacher of the Yellow Emperor, Lao Tzu, Ninth Heaven Mysterious Goddess, and the Heavenly Emperor.

In Taoism, Original Lord (Chinese: 元君) is a respectful title for high-ranking female divine immortals.

In Tao Te Ching, Tao is often described as a feminine concept or figure, e.g. the mother of the universe who gives birth to all of existence and sustains it. Holy Mother the Original Lord is the personification of this feminine concept or principle.
