= Jiangshi =

Type of creature from Chinese legend and folklore

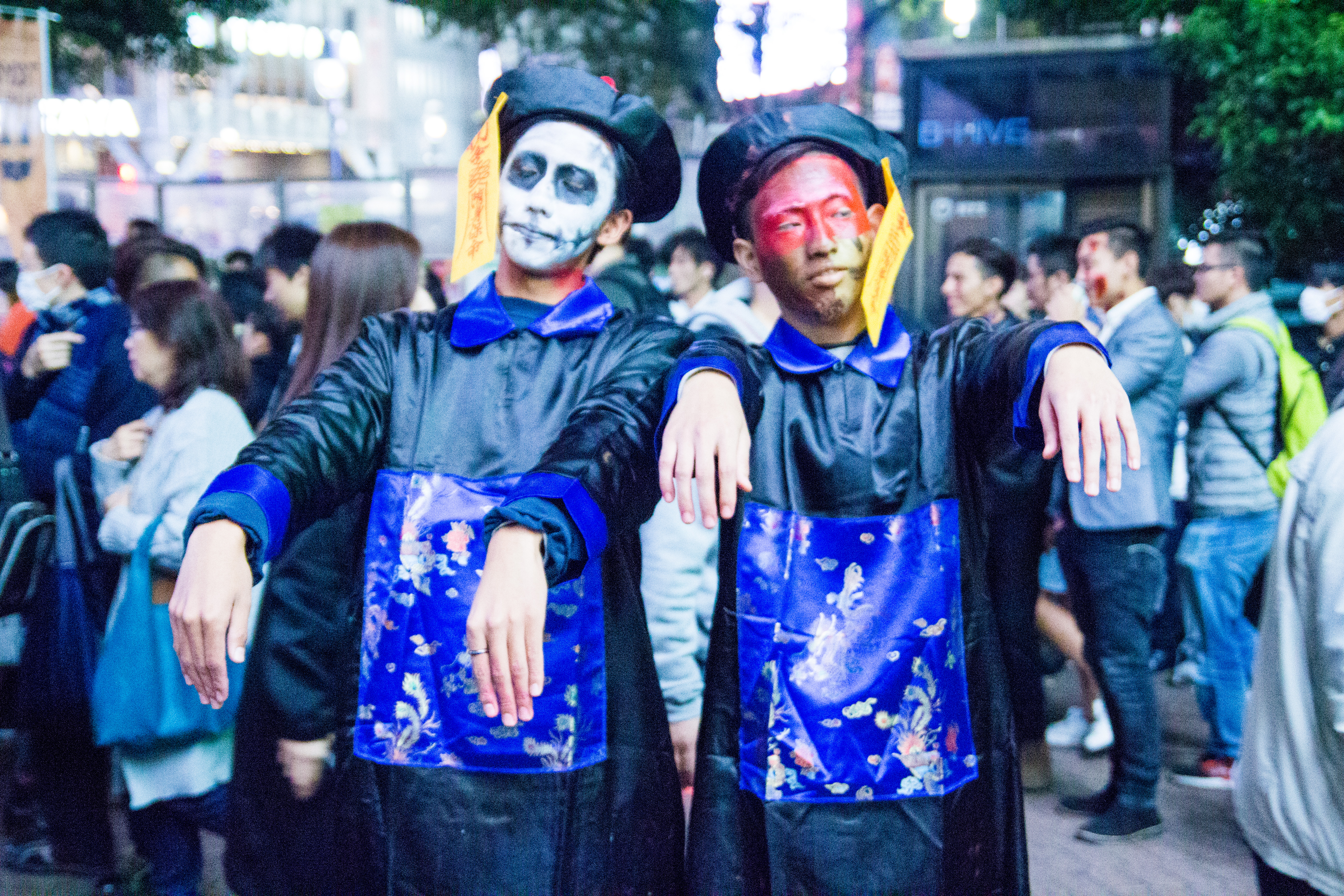
- Two people dressed up as jiāngshī. Here, the fulu is hanging from the forehead.

Chinese name
- Traditional Chinese: 殭屍
- Simplified Chinese: 僵尸
- Hanyu Pinyin: jiāngshī
- Literal meaning: stiff corpse
Transcriptions
Standard Mandarin
- Hanyu Pinyin: jiāngshī
- Bopomofo: ㄐㄧㄤ ㄕ
- Gwoyeu Romatzyh: jiangshy
- Wade–Giles: chiang¹-shih¹
Yue: Cantonese
- Yale Romanization: gēung sī
- Jyutping: goeng¹-si¹
Southern Min
- Hokkien POJ: khiong-si

Vietnamese name
- Vietnamese alphabet: cương thi
- Chữ Hán: 殭屍

Korean name
- Hangul: 강시
- Hanja: 殭屍
Transcriptions
- Revised Romanization: gangsi

Japanese name
- Kanji: 殭屍
- Kana: キョンシー
Transcriptions
- Romanization: kyonshī

A jiāngshī (simplified Chinese: 僵尸; traditional Chinese: 殭屍; pinyin: jiāngshī; Jyutping: goeng1 si1), also known as a Chinese hopping vampire, is a type of undead creature or reanimated corpse in Chinese legends and folklore. Due to the influence of Hong Kong cinema, it is typically depicted in modern popular culture as a stiff corpse dressed in official garments from the Qing dynasty. Although the pronunciation of jiangshi varies in different East Asian countries, all of them refer to the Chinese version of vampire.

In popular culture, it is commonly represented as hopping or leaping. In folkloric accounts, however, it is more formidable, capable of giving chase by running, and if sufficiently ancient or if it has absorbed sufficient yang energy, capable also of flight. According to folkloric understandings, "jiāngshī came from the hills, soaring through the air, to devour the infants of the people".

Historian J. J. M. de Groot suggests that the belief in jiangshi was the result of the natural horror at the sight of dead bodies, nourished by the presence of unburied corpses in imperial China, which "studded the landscape", the idea of the vital energy flowing through the universe as capable of animating objects - including exposed corpses - and by severe cultural taboos concerning postponement of burial. These fears are described as having preoccupied "credulous and superstitious minds in Amoy".

The belief in jiangshi and its representation in the popular imagination was also partly derived from the habit of "corpse-driving", a practice involving the repatriation of the corpses of dead laborers across Xiang province (present-day Hunan) to their hometowns for burial in family gravesites. The corpses were trussed up against bamboo sticks and carried by professionals known as corpse-drivers and transported over thousands of miles to their ancestral villages, which gave the impression of a hopping corpse. These professionals operated during the night to avoid crowds during the day, which served to amplify the fearful effects of their trade.

Jiangshi legends have inspired a genre of jiangshi films and literature in Hong Kong and the rest of East Asia. Movies such as Mr. Vampire and its various sequels (Mr. Vampire II, Mr. Vampire III, and Mr. Vampire IV) became cult classics in comedy-horror and inspired a vampire craze in East Asia, including Taiwan and Japan. Today, jiangshi appear in toys and video games. Jiangshi costumes are also sometimes employed during Halloween.

== Origins ==
The Qing dynasty scholar Ji Xiaolan mentioned in his book Yuewei Caotang Biji (閱微草堂筆記) (c. 1789 – 1798) that the causes for a corpse to be reanimated can be classified in either of two categories: a recently deceased person returning to life, or a corpse that has been buried for a long time but does not decompose.

Some causes are described below:

- The use of supernatural arts to resurrect the dead.
- Spirit possession of a dead body.
- A corpse absorbs sufficient yang qi (positive energy) to return to life.
- When the lower parts of the person's soul remain in the body to assume control after death. Traditional Chinese thought posits that a person's body is governed by three huns and seven pos. The Qing dynasty scholar Yuan Mei wrote in his book Zi Bu Yu that "A person's hun is good but the po is evil, the hun is intelligent but the po is not so good". When the hun leaves the body after death but the po remains and takes control of the body, the dead person becomes a jiangshi.
- When the dead person is not buried even after a funeral has been held. The corpse comes to life after it is struck by a bolt of lightning, or when a pregnant cat (or a black cat in some tales) leaps across the coffin.
- When a person's soul fails to leave their deceased body, due to improper death, suicide, or that person just wanting to cause trouble.
- A person injured by a jiangshi is infected with the "jiangshi poison" and gradually changes into a jiangshi over time, as seen in the Mr. Vampire films.

== Appearance and attributes ==
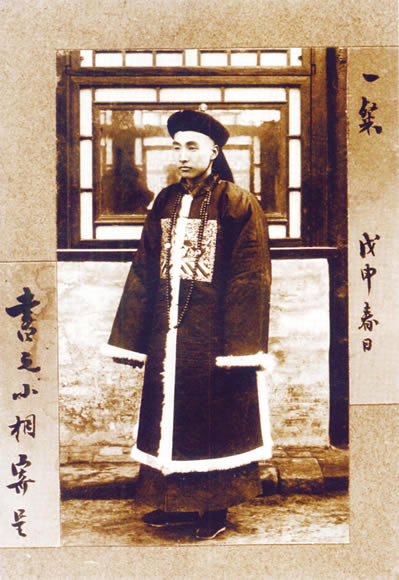
Official uniform of a mandarin from Qing dynasty, which jiangshi are usually portrayed wearing

In both folklore and popular culture, the appearance of a jiangshi can range from that of a recently deceased person in a state of rigor mortis to that of a horribly decayed and rotting corpse. The jiangshi always lacks the suppleness that characterized a living person or even the Western vampire. The Chinese character for jiang (殭/僵) in "jiangshi" literally means "hard" or "stiff".

=== Folklore ===
Jiangshi are described as having greenish-white skin, possibly deriving from fungus or mould growing on corpses. They have long hair and may behave like animals. They are ferocious, ravenous beings possessing extreme strength, being described as attacking men with "brute force and clumsy violence". They are often represented as being capable of giving chase by running, and sometimes by flying - "a jiangshi came from the hills, soaring through the air, to devour the infants of the people".

== Methods and items used to counter jiangshi ==
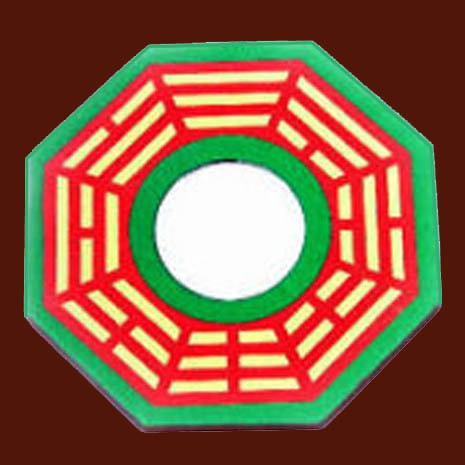
Bagua mirror

- Mirrors: According to Li Shizhen's medical book Bencao Gangmu, "A mirror is the essence of liquid metal. It is dark on the outside but bright inside." (鏡乃金水之精，內明外暗。) Jiangshi are also said to be terrified of their own reflections.
- Items made from the wood of a peach tree: According to the Jingchu Suishi Ji (荊楚歲時記)), "Peach is the essence of the Five Elements. It can subjugate evil auras and deter evil spirits." (桃者，五行之精，能厭服邪氣，制御百鬼。)
- A rooster's call: According to Yuan Mei's book Zi Bu Yu, "Evil spirits withdraw when they hear a rooster's call" (鬼聞雞鳴即縮。), because the rooster's call usually occurs with the rise of the sun.
- Jujube seeds: According to Zi Bu Yu, "Nail seven jujube seeds into the acupuncture points on the back of a corpse." (棗核七枚，釘入屍脊背穴。)
- Fire: According to Zi Bu Yu, "When set on fire, the sound of crackling flames, blood rushes forth and bones cry." (放火燒之，嘖嘖之聲，血湧骨鳴。)
- Hooves of a black donkey: Mentioned in Zhang Muye's fantasy novel Ghost Blows Out the Light
- Vinegar: Mentioned by coroners in eastern Fujian.
- Fulu (Taoist talisman), stuck on the forehead to immobilise them. With a unique spell, it can be used to transport the creatures with the handbell.
- Holding one's breath, which makes the jiangshi unable to find you as they are blind, though this contradicts the earlier statement that they are afraid of their own reflection.
- Bagua symbols
- The I Ching
- The Tong Shu
- Glutinous rice, rice chaff
- Adzuki beans
- Handbell
- Thread stained with a concoction of black ink, chicken blood and burnt talisman
- Blood of a black dog
- Stonemason's awl
- Axe
- Broom
- Dropping a bag of coins can cause the jiangshi to count the coins.

Architectural features

It is also the conventional belief of feng shui practitioners in Chinese architecture that a threshold (traditional Chinese: 門檻; simplified Chinese: 门槛; pinyin: ménkǎn), a piece of wood approximately 15 cm (6 in) high, be installed along the width of the door at the bottom to prevent a jiangshi from entering the household.

== Origin stories ==
=== Taboos regarding unburied dead ===
De Groot observes that unburied corpses studded the landscape of imperial China, causing great fear and nourishing "an inveterate belief in these specters". Furthermore, it was supposed that corpses, if left unburied and exposed to the sun and moon so as to absorb the vital energy permeating the universe, could reanimate as ravening jiangshi. The notion that corpses are prone to becoming jiangshi when their burial is long-postponed would have motivated the populace to quickly bury the dead in their midst.

=== Corpse-driving in Western Hunan ===
A supposed source of the jiangshi stories came from the folk practice of "transporting a corpse over a thousand li" (千里行屍; 千里行尸; qiān lǐ xíng shī). This was also known as "driving corpses in Xiangxi" (湘西趕屍; 湘西赶尸; Xiāngxī gǎn shī).

During the Qing dynasty, laborers from all over China often engaged in difficult construction work in the backwaters of western Hunan (Xiangxi), and the mortality rates were high. The Chinese preferred to be buried alongside family, partly due to the belief that their souls might feel homesick if they were buried far from home, so an industry for the transportation of these corpses to their native villages, often across thousands of miles, soon developed. The corpses would be arranged upright in single file and be tied to long bamboo rods on the sides, while two men (one at the front and one at the back) would carry the ends of the rods on their shoulders and walk. When the bamboo flexed up and down, the corpses appeared to be "hopping" in unison when viewed from a distance away.

Two oral accounts of transporting corpses are included in Liao Yiwu's The Corpse Walker. One account describes how corpses would be transported by a two-man team. One would carry the corpse on his back with a large robe covering both of them and a mourning mask on top. The other man would walk ahead with a lantern and warn his companion about obstacles ahead of him. The lantern was used as a visual guide for the corpse carrier to follow since they could not see with the robe covering them. It is speculated in the accounts in the book that corpses would be carried at night to avoid contact with people and the cooler air would be more suitable to transporting bodies.

=== Myth and legend ===
Actual corpse-driving using manual labor gave rise to legends and rumors of the use of Taoist sorcery to transport dead bodies. According to these tales, the relatives of a person who died far away from home could not afford vehicles to have the deceased person's body transported home for burial, so they would hire a Taoist priest to conduct a ritual to reanimate the dead person and teach them to "hop" their way home. The priests would transport the corpses only at night and would ring bells to notify others in the vicinity of their presence because it was considered bad luck for a living person to set eyes upon a jiang shi.

Some speculate that the stories about jiang shi were originally made up by smugglers who disguised their illegal activities as corpse transportation and wanted to scare off law enforcement officers.

== Similar folklore ==
Archaeologists have found revenant and what appear to be deviant burials dating back to 4500–3800 BC in Cyprus. Those born as illegitimate children, with abnormalities, or on inauspicious days, or who were victims of murder, drowning, suicide, curses, or the Black Death were thought to have had the potential to be a vampire. A suspected vampire would be incinerated or dismembered to prevent their return. Other preventive methods included deep buried burial, prone burials, and tying, staking, or pinning corpses with stones. These types of burials have been discovered in numerous locations, including Egypt, Greece, and Rome. Slavic folklore references vampires and preventions dating back to the 11th century with Drawsko, Poland being home to some of these burial sites and early discoveries of such practices. The three primary areas of focus upon burial to prevent vampirism were the mouth, the hands, and the feet, as the mouth is used for feeding, the hands are used for grasping victims, and the feet are used for movement. Folklore and burial practices dealing with revenants can also be traced back to Norse mythology with draugar or draug(s) that closely resemble stories of jiangshis. These draugar were also re-animated corpses that rose from their graves, and many of the various accounts report the draugr to be sighted far from its initial burial site.

== In popular culture ==
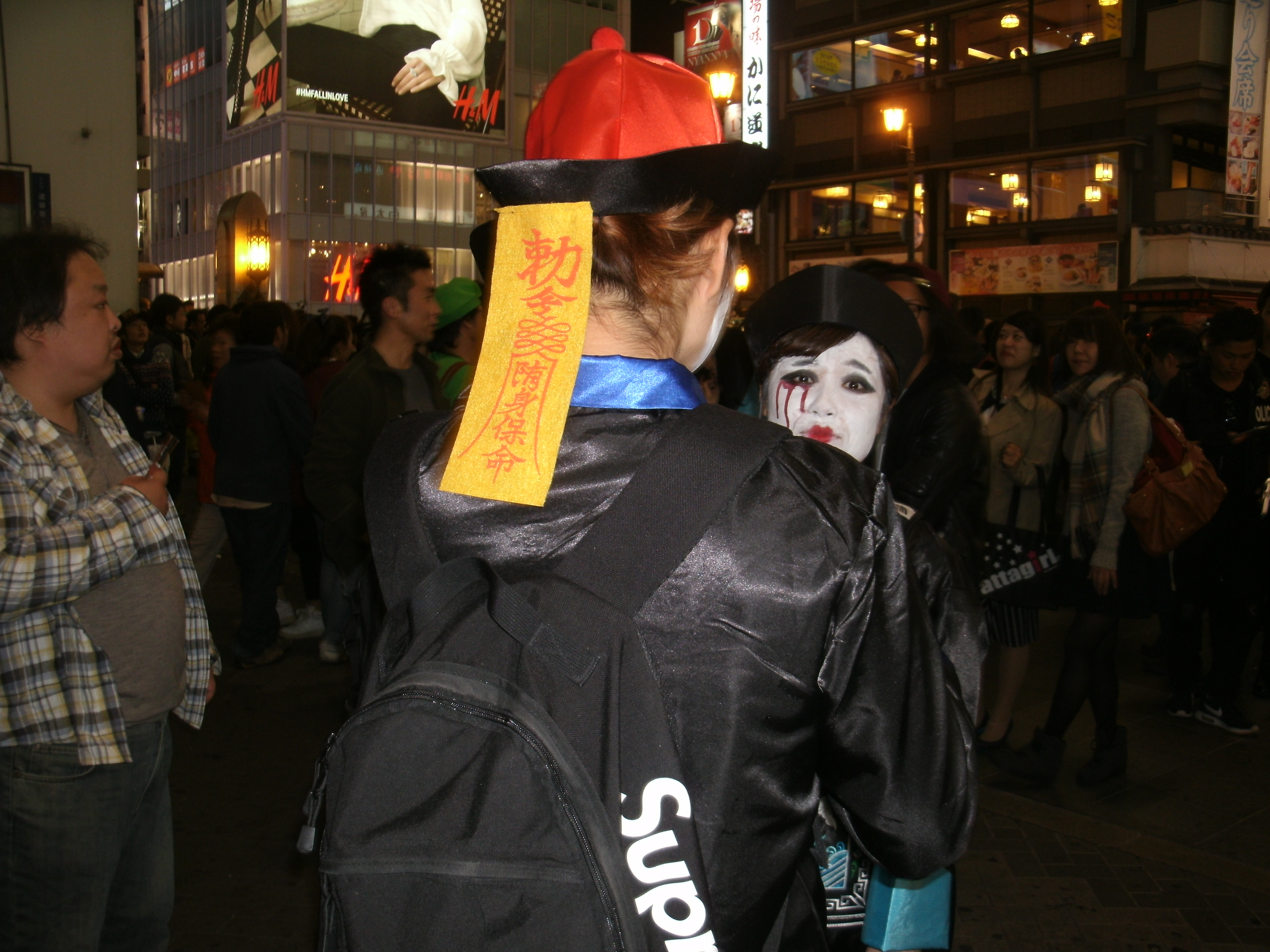
A jiangshi costume on Halloween in Osaka

In popular culture, such as in jiangshi movies, jiangshi have a standard appearance. They have a paper talisman (fulu, with a sealing spell) attached onto and hanging off the forehead in portrait orientation, and wear a uniform coat-like robe and round-top tall rimmed hat (winter guanmao) characteristic of a Qing dynasty mandarin. The influence of western vampire stories brought the blood-sucking aspect to the Chinese myth in more modern times in combination with the concept of the hungry ghost, though traditionally they feed solely on the qi of a living individual for sustenance and in order to grow more powerful. Some claim that their modern visual depiction as horrific Qing officials may have been derived by the anti-Manchu or anti-Qing sentiments of the Han Chinese population during the Qing dynasty, as the officials were viewed as bloodthirsty creatures with little regard for humanity, although the plausibility of this claim is affected by the lapse of time between the modern depiction and the end of the Qing empire.

=== Literature ===
Major texts featuring jiangshi include Pu Songling's Strange Tales from Laiozhai Studio and Yuan Mei's What the Master Would Not Discuss.

=== Cinema and popular culture ===
Jiangshi legends have inspired a genre of jiangshi films and literature in Hong Kong and the rest of East Asia. Movies such as Mr. Vampire and its various spin-offs Mr. Vampire II, Mr. Vampire III, and Mr. Vampire IV became cult classics in comedy-horror and inspired a short-lived vampire craze in East Asia, including Taiwan and Japan. The craze subsided quickly by the mid-1990s but enjoyed a brief resurgence in the early 2000s. Attempts to experiment with the genre by producing pure horror movies, such as Tsui Hark's The Era of Vampires without the comic elements, have met with criticism and lacked the same popularity.

Chiaotzu in Dragon Ball dress himself as a jiangshi, but his true nature is not known. Today, jiangshi appear in toys and video games, and Jiangshi costumes are also sometimes employed during Halloween.

=== Video games ===
- Phantom Fighter and Vice: Project Doom depict jiangshi as enemies.
- Hsien-Ko in Darkstalkers is a Jiangshi.
- Qiqi in Genshin Impact is a Jiangshi.
- Yoshika Miyako in Touhou Project is a Jiangshi.
- Centipede Apostle in Limbus Company is based on Jiangshi.
- A pair of Jiangshi appear as cyborg antagonists in the video game Nine Sols.
- Geung-si, a mag in Phantasy Star Online is based on Jiangshi.
- Jiangshi appear as enemies in Sly 3: Honor Among Thieves during game's fourth chapter.
- Jiangshi appear as enemies in The Sleeping Dogs DLC Nightmare In North Point as one of the main enemy types.
- Kingdom Hearts II features Jiangshi as "Emblem Heartless" by the name of Nightwalker.
- In Ragnarok Online, the jiangshi are represented primarily by the undead monsters Munak, Bongun, and Hyegun.

== See also ==
- Chinese ghosts
- Chinese mythology
- Draugr
- Hungry ghost
- Medieval revenant
- Ro-langs
- Sexual vampire
- Undead
- Vampire burial
- Vetala
- Wight
- Yaoguai
- Yokai
- Zombie
