= Ghosts in Chinese culture =

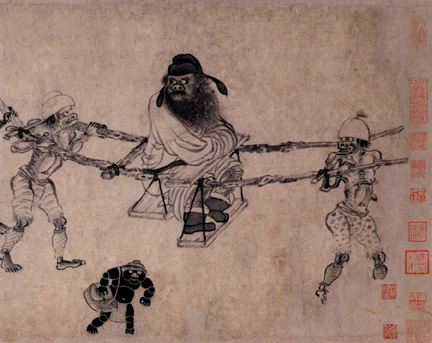
An image of Zhong Kui, the vanquisher of ghosts and evil beings, painted sometime before 1304 by Gong Kai.

Chinese folklore features a rich variety of ghosts, monsters, and other supernatural creatures. According to traditional beliefs a ghost is the spirit form of a person who has died. Ghosts are typically malevolent and will cause harm to the living if provoked. Many Chinese folk beliefs about ghosts have been adopted into the mythologies and folklore of neighboring East Asian cultures, notably Japan, Korea, and Vietnam. Beliefs about ghosts are closely associated with Chinese ancestor worship, where much have been incorporated into Buddhism and in turn influenced and created uniquely Chinese Buddhist beliefs about the supernatural.

Traditionally, the Chinese believed that it was possible to contact the spirits of deceased relatives and ancestors through a medium. It was believed that the spirits of the deceased can help them if they were properly respected and rewarded. The annual Hungry Ghost Festival, celebrated in China (including Hong Kong and Macao), Taiwan, Malaysia, Singapore, and elsewhere in the Chinese diaspora, is dedicated to performing rituals to honor and remember the spirits of the dead. On this day ghosts and other supernatural creatures come out from the underworld and move among the living. Families prepare food and other offerings and place them on a shrine dedicated to deceased relatives. Incense and paper money are burned and other rituals are performed in hopes that the spirits of the dead will protect and bring good luck to the family.

Ghosts are described in classical Chinese texts and continue to be depicted in modern literature and movies.

== Terminology ==
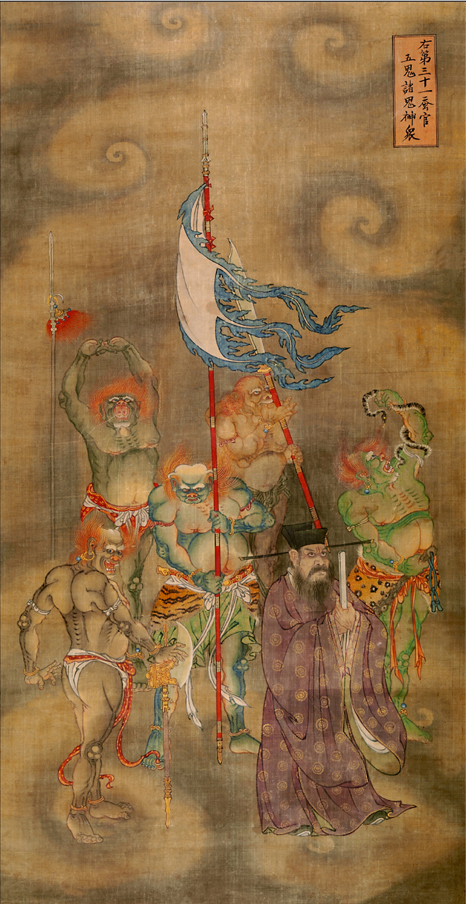
Shuilu ritual painting of Canshen and the Five Demons of Pestilence from Baoning Temple, Shanxi, China

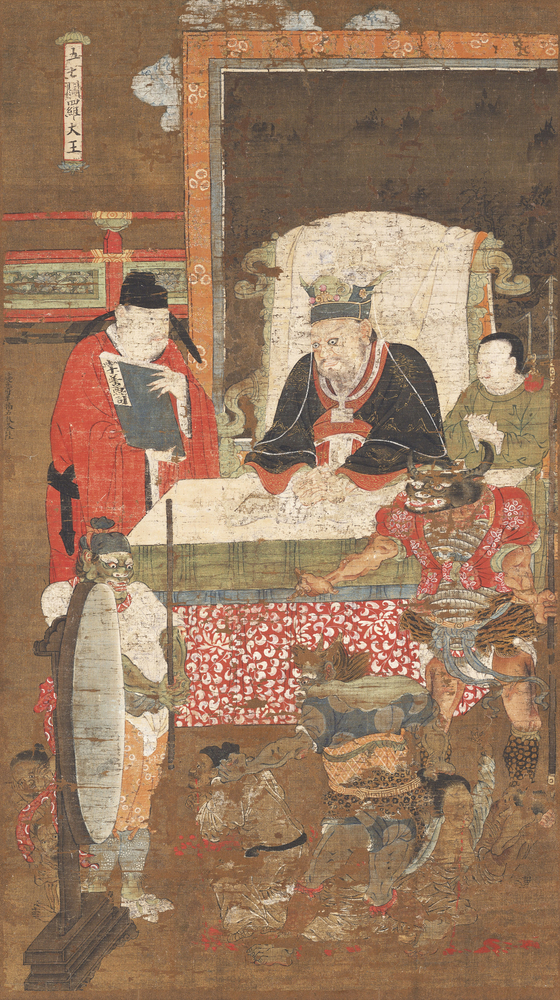
14th-century Chinese Yuan dynasty portrait of King Yama. One of a series of paintings of the "Ten Kings of Hell" by Lu Xinzhong

Gui (Chinese: 鬼; pinyin: guǐ) is the general Chinese term for ghost, used in combination with other symbols to give related meanings such as guilao (鬼佬), literally "ghost man", a Cantonese pejorative term for foreigners, and mogwai (魔鬼) meaning "devil". Characters such as 魇; yǎn; 'nightmare' also carry related meanings.

Yan Wang (閻王), also called Yanluowang (閻羅王) is the sovereign of the underworld. He is also the judge of the underworld, and decides whether the dead will have good or miserable future lives. Although ultimately based on the god Yama of the Hindu Vedas, the Buddhist Yan Wang has developed different myths and different functions from the Hindu deity. Yan Wang is normally depicted wearing a Chinese judge's cap in Chinese and Japanese art. He sometimes appears on Chinese hell bank notes.

Zhong Kui is the vanquisher of ghosts and evil beings. Portraits of him were hung in Chinese houses at the end of the Chinese lunar year to scare away evil spirits and demons. He is depicted as fierce man with a black face and a comic beard brandishing a magic sword. Zhong Kui is said to be himself the ghost of a man who failed to pass the civil service examinations and committed suicide. He then became a ghost hunter. There is a story that the Emperor Xuanzong of Tang once dreamed that a small ghost stole the purse of the imperial consort. A larger ghost – Zhong Kui – captured the smaller one and returned the purse.

== History ==
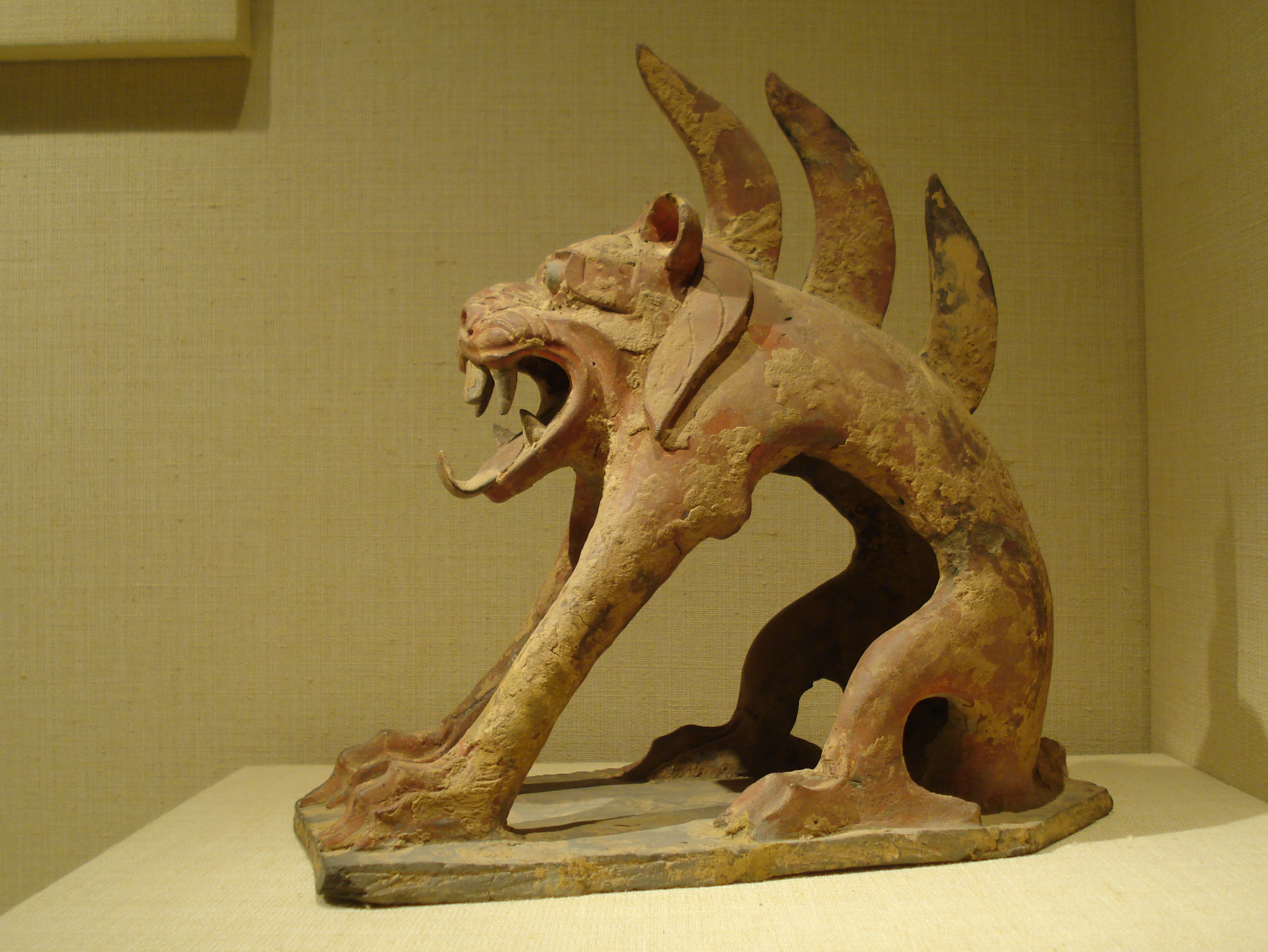
Chinese Tomb Guardian from around the time of the Northern Wei/Northern Qi dynasties. Used to protect the soul of the deceased from evil.

There has been extensive interaction between traditional Chinese beliefs and the more recent Confucianism, Taoism, and Buddhism.

Ancestor worship is the original basic Chinese religion. The core belief is that there is a continued existence after death. It is thought that the soul of a deceased person is made up of yin and yang components called hun and po. The yin component, po, is associated with the grave, and the yang component, hun, is associated with ancestral tablets. At death the components split into three different souls; the po stays with the body to the grave, another goes to judgment, and the hun resides in an ancestral tablet. The po and hun are not immortal and need to be nourished by offerings made by descendants. Eventually both the po and hun go to the underworld, although the hun goes to heaven first. Unlike in western usages of the term, underworld has no negative connotation.

King Xuan of Zhou (827–783 BC) according to Chinese legend executed his minister, Du Bo, on false charges even after being warned that Du Bo's ghost would seek revenge. Three years later, according to historical chronicles, Du Bo's ghost shot and killed Xuan with a bow and arrow before an assembly of feudal lords. The Chinese philosopher, Mozi (470–391 BC), is quoted as having commented:

If from antiquity to the present, and since the beginning of man, there are men who have seen the bodies of ghosts and spirits and heard their voices, how can we say that they do not exist? If none have heard them and none have seen them, then how can we say they do? But those who deny the existence of the spirits say: "Many in the world have heard and seen something of ghosts and spirits. Since they vary in testimony, who are to be accepted as really having heard and seen them?" Mozi said: As we are to rely on what many have jointly seen and what many have jointly heard, the case of Du Bo is to be accepted.

Religious Taoism finally came together during the Han dynasty (206 BCE–220 AD) around the time Buddhism was introduced to China, and it rose to predominance during the Tang dynasty (618–907 AD), which initially tolerated its coexistence. Reverence for nature and ancestor spirits is common in popular Taoism. Banned during the Cultural Revolution (along with all other religions), religious Taoism is undergoing a major revival today, and it is the spirituality followed by about 30% (400 million) of the total Chinese population.

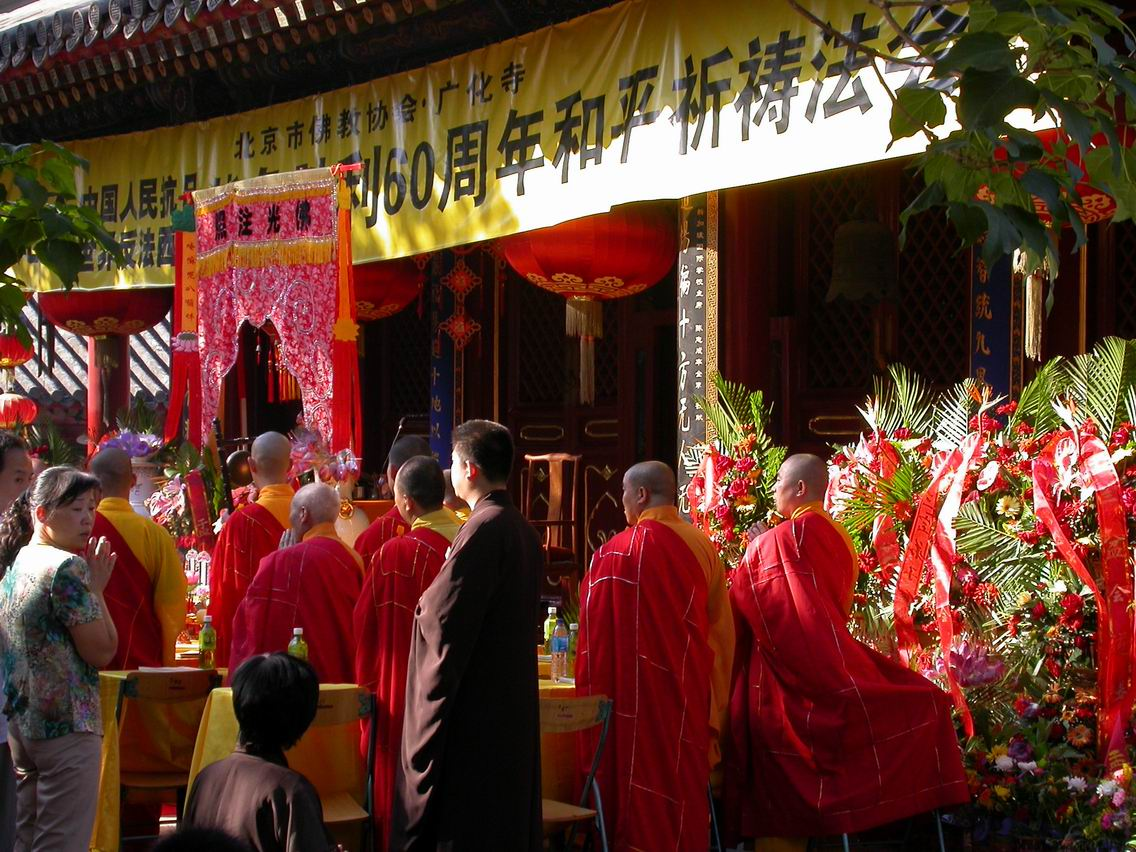
A modern Buddhist ceremony held in Guanghua Temple in Beijing.

Buddhism was introduced into China in the 1st century CE, and rapidly became popular with its belief in a continuous cycle of rebirth and more complex ghost beliefs, although the older beliefs lingered. The entry of Buddhism into China was marked by interaction and syncretism with Taoism in particular. Originally seen as a kind of "foreign Taoism", Buddhism's scriptures were translated into Chinese using the Taoist vocabulary.

Elements of pre-Han dynasty mythologies such as those in Shan Hai Jing were adapted into these belief systems as they developed (in the case of Taoism), or were assimilated into Chinese culture (in the case of Buddhism). On the other hand, elements from the teachings and beliefs of these systems became incorporated into Chinese mythology. For example, the Taoist belief of a spiritual paradise became incorporated into mythology, as the place where immortals and deities dwell.

The state of ancestor veneration in modern-day China is reported to be declining in urban areas; however, in rural areas of China, as well as Taiwan, ancestor worship and its practices can still be commonly found. Andrew Kipnis finds that, because of the rapid urbanization of China, urban dwellers are more afraid of ghosts than people in the countryside. City people are more detached from death and from the people they interact with and, hence, view the death of their neighbors as a potential source of ghosts. Rural dwellers see the people around them as relatives to some degree so, when they die, they can become ancestors rather than ghosts after the proper ceremonies. Urban cemeteries and funeral businesses are inauspicious and depreciate surrounding real estate. Apartments where unusual deaths happened can be listed in online lists of haunted places lowering the rent price. Authorities try to remove the deceased and the associated facilities from view. Announcing a death in the apartment block is distasteful and setting up an altar for a deceased relative can be illegal in the bigger cities. Scattering the ashes of a cremated person in a park is not allowed as it would make park visitors afraid of ghosts. Funeral parlors may set up small fires so that visitors can jump over them to counter the yin received from the dead.

== Practices and beliefs ==
=== Types of ghosts ===
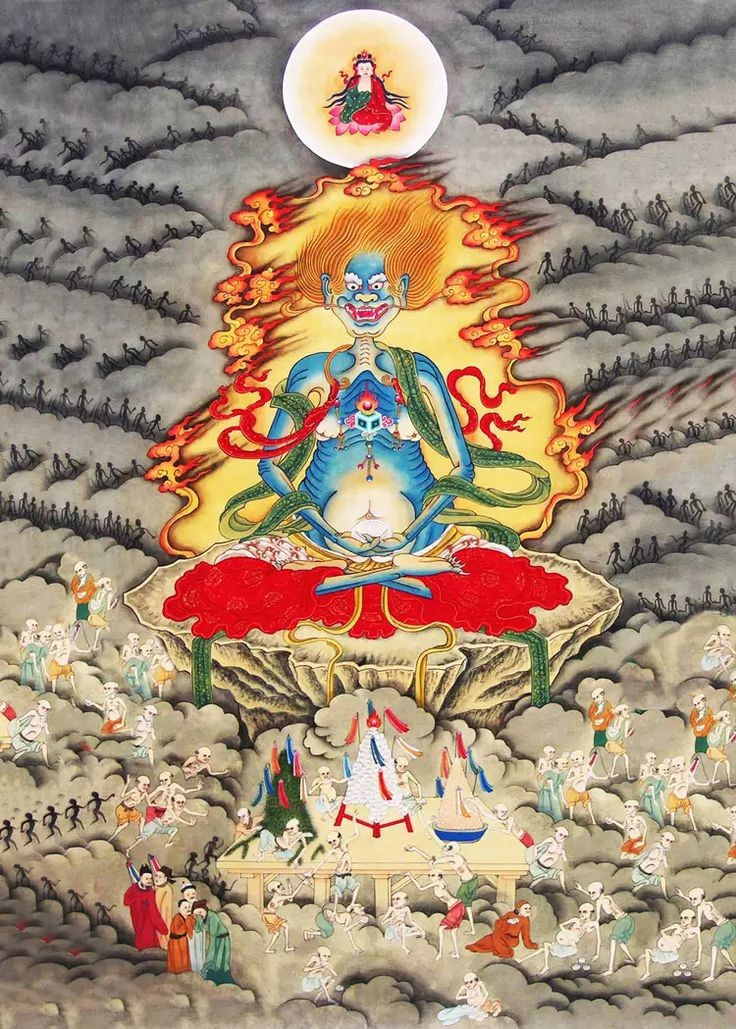
Ming dynasty Shuilu ritual painting of Flaming-Faced Ghost King and hungry ghosts.

Many kinds of ghosts have been introduced throughout Chinese folklore and philosophy. In the Śūraṅgama Sūtra, ghosts are depicted as the souls of wicked humans who, after undergoing punishment for their offenses in the afterlife, are eventually reborn as demons. Like the immortal xian, the text describes ten types of ghosts, characterizing each type with their principal offense and their unique ability:

- Weird ghosts (怪鬼; 妖鬼; yāoguǐ or guàiguǐ) were consumed by materialism in life and can transform into any physical object.
- Drought ghosts (魃鬼; báguǐ) were consumed by carnal lust in life and can create hot, dry winds.
- Trickster ghosts (魅鬼; mèiguǐ) caused confusion in life and can transform into animals.
- Venomous ghosts (蠱毒鬼; gǔdú-guǐ) were hateful to others in life and can transform into insects.
- Pestilence ghosts (疠鬼; lìguǐ) harbored grudges in life and can cause disease and decay.
- Hungry ghosts (饿鬼; èguǐ) were arrogant in life and can take on gaseous forms.
- Nightmare ghosts (魘鬼; yǎnguǐ) were frauds in life and can transform into pure darkness.
- Goblin ghosts (魍魉鬼; wǎngliǎng-guǐ) were corrupted by their desire for insight in life and are formed from the essential energy within rocks and trees.
- Servant ghosts (役使鬼; yìshǐ-guǐ) were corrupted by their desire for accomplishment in life and can transform into blinding light.
- Messenger ghosts (传送鬼; chuánsòng-guǐ) were litigious in life and can transform into any person.

Another classification is mentioned in A Dictionary of Chinese Buddhist Terms (翻譯名義集; Fānyì Míngyì Jí). There are nine types of hungry ghosts, all divided into three main classes:

- Ghosts without means (無財鬼; wú cái guǐ):
  - Torch-mouth ghosts (炬口鬼; jùkǒu guǐ) have mouths like burning torches.
  - Needle-mouth ghosts (針口鬼; zhēnkǒu guǐ) have mouths no bigger than needles, so they cannot satisfy their hunger or thirst.
  - Foul-mouth ghosts (臭口鬼; chòukǒu guǐ) have vile breath, disgusting even to themselves.
- Ghosts with small means (少財鬼; shǎo cái guǐ):
  - Needle-hair ghosts (針毛鬼; zhēnmáo guǐ) have hair like iron needles, distressing to themselves and others.
  - Smelly-hair ghosts (臭毛鬼; chòumáo guǐ) have spike-like hair that emits an awful odor.
  - Tumour ghosts (癭鬼; yǐng guǐ) have large goiters on whose pus they must feed.
- Ghosts with excessive means (多財鬼; duō cái guǐ):
  - Ghosts hoping for offerings (希祀鬼; xīsìguǐ) live on sacrificial offerings, usually from their descendants.
  - Ghosts hoping for leavings or ghosts that inhale energy (吸氣鬼; 希棄鬼; xīqìguǐ) eat any human leftovers, and can even devour the qi of living beings.
  - Ghosts of great powers (大勢鬼; dàshì guǐ) are powerful rulers of ghosts (like yakshas, rakshasas, pishachas, etc.), who are perpetually aggressive and violent.

The literary term Hero among ghosts (鬼雄; guǐxióng) refers to a person who has died a heroic death.

One particular type of ghost, the chāng (伥; 倀), is referenced in the four-character classical idiom wèihǔzuòchāng (为虎作伥; 爲虎作倀). In folklore, the chang ghost is said to be the ghost of a person who died of a tiger bite who then assists the tiger by luring to it further victims. This idiom then translates literally to "serving as a chang for the tiger", or more loosely as "serving as the tiger's accomplice". Used metaphorically, it refers to a person helping a villain commit evil, with the implication that the person was initially a disinterested party or was even previously a victim of the villain.

==== Tibetan ghosts ====
Spirits and ghosts exist in Tibetan culture.

"A class of malign spirits" called bewitchers ('gong-po) "are thought to frequent the atmosphere and the earth". Many were "bound under an oath of allegiance to Buddhism" by the Buddhist master Padmasambhava during the 8th century. They have the "power to generate life-threatening obstacles" to attack people who recently lost friends or family, but their danger can be "averted by counteracting rituals."

=== Mediums ===
The use of mediums to communicate with spirits is an important practice in traditional Chinese culture, and is closely linked to ancestor worship. The medium (問米; 問覡; mun mai poh) or "ask rice woman" helps to ask the ancestor what they require on the other side, and these needs can be provided through the burning of paper effigies. In return, the spirit can be of great help in matters such as winning the lottery or being admitted to low-cost government housing. The person visiting the medium will take a cup of rice from their kitchen to identify the family. Through these communications the dead help the living while the living help the dead. The name involves a pun, since with a change in intonation "ask rice" becomes "spirit medium".

=== Ghost festival ===
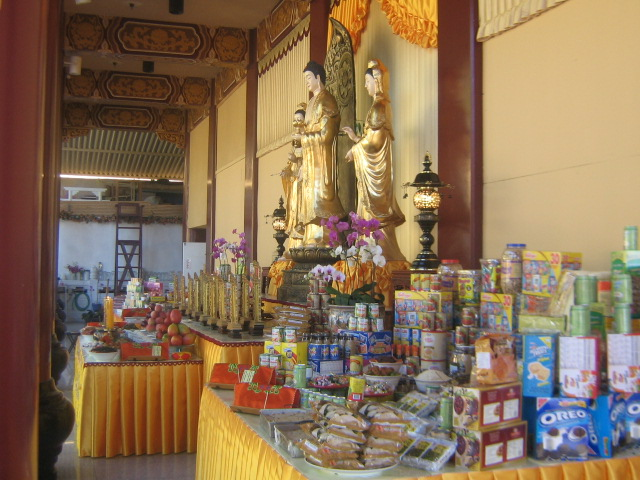
An array of foods being offered to the deceased during Ghost festival

The Ghost Festival is a traditional Chinese festival celebrated by Chinese in many countries. The fifteenth day of the seventh month in the lunar calendar is called Ghost Day and the seventh month in general is regarded as the 'Ghost Month' (鬼月), in which ghosts and spirits, including those of the deceased ancestors, come out from the lower realm. Distinct from both the Qingming Festival (in Spring) and Chung Yeung Festival (in Autumn) in which living descendants pay homage to their deceased ancestors, on Ghost Day, the deceased are believed to visit the living. The festival has a long history. A Japanese pilgrim gave a detailed account of the Ghost festival in the Tang capital of Chang'an in the year 840. In those day the festival was usually called by its Buddhist name of yu lan p'en.

Buddhists associate the Ghost Festival with the legend of Moginlin (Mulian) saving his mother from the underworld. In this story, the hero learns that his mother is starving in the underworld. He travels there, overcoming many difficulties, and offers her food. However, the food bursts into flames before she can eat. In despair, he asks Sakyamuni for advice. The Buddha tells him to find ten monks who will fast and pray together with him on the 15th day of the seventh moon. Moginlin follows this advice and finally manages to release his mother from her torments.

On the fifteenth day the realms of Heaven and Hell and the realm of the living are open and Chinese would perform rituals to transmute and absolve the sufferings of the deceased. Intrinsic to the Ghost Month is ancestor worship, where traditionally the filial piety of descendants extends to their ancestors even after their deaths. Activities during the month would include preparing ritualistic food offerings, burning incense, and burning joss paper, a papier-mache form of material items such as clothes, gold and other fine goods for the visiting spirits of the ancestors. Elaborate meals would be served with empty seats for each of the deceased in the family treating the deceased as if they are still living. Ancestor worship is what distinguishes Qingming Festival from Ghost Festival because the latter includes paying respects to all deceased, including the same and younger generations, while the former includes only older generations. Other festivities may include, buying and releasing miniature paper boats and lanterns on water, which signifies giving directions to the lost ghosts and spirits of the ancestors and other deities.

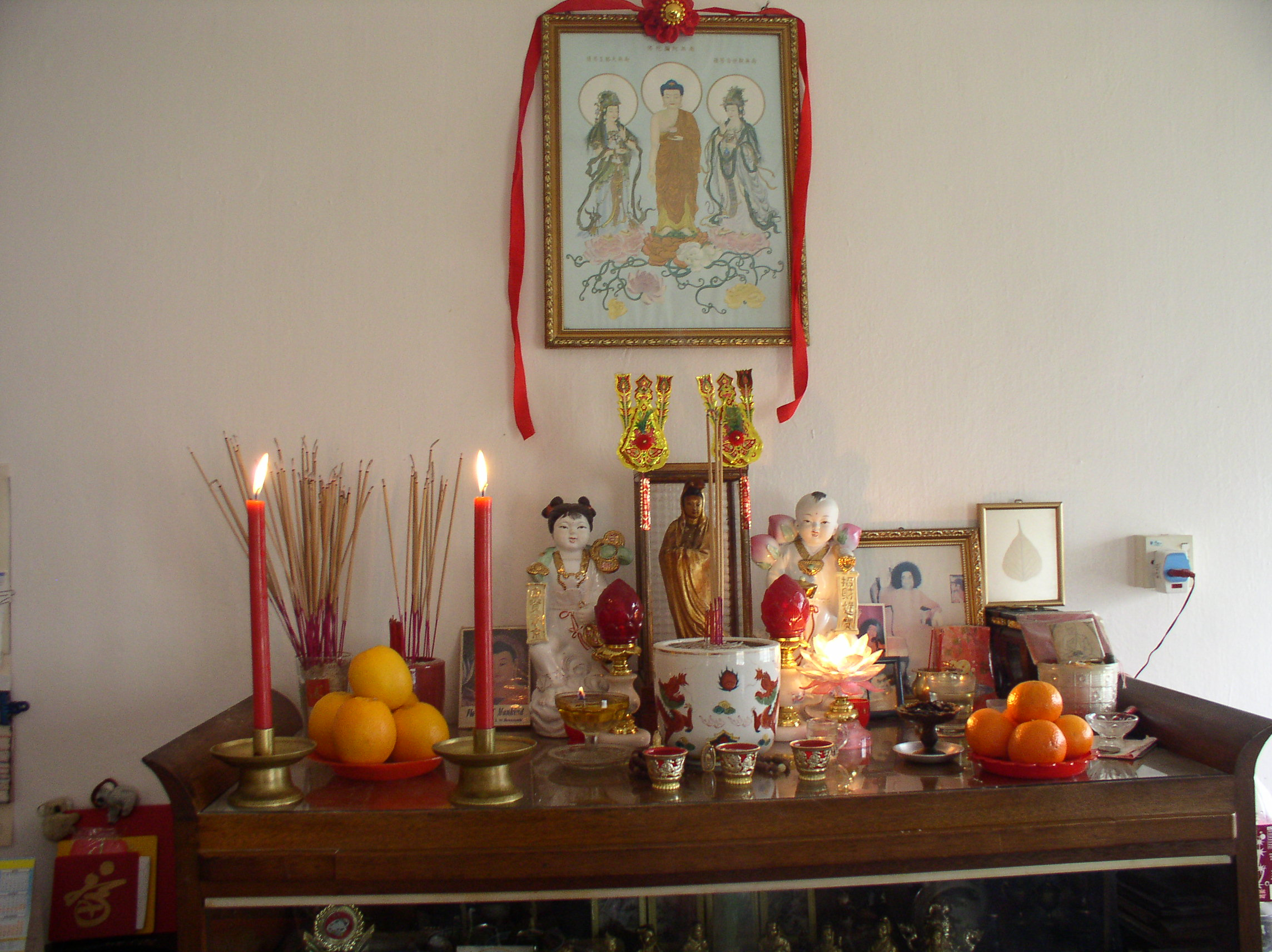
This picture was taken at a Malaysian Chinese home. This altar is dedicated to the three Pure Land sages, Avalokitesvara, and Sathya Sai Baba. On the left of the altar is a glass filled with rice. Joss sticks are stuck into it after the ancestors are invited to partake in the offering of food specially prepared for them on the Hungry Ghost festival prayers.

The modern festival of Chung Yuan Putu or "Mid-origin Passage to Universal Salvation" owes its origins to both the Buddhist Ullambana (Deliverance) Festival and the Taoist Chinese Ghost Festival, both of which honor the spirits of the departed, and which have now been combined. Historically, families offer sacrifices of the newly harvested grain to departed ancestors on this day. In some parts of China, believers make small roadside fires where they burn paper money and other offerings to appease the restless spirits that have temporarily been released from the underworld.

During the ghost festival, people try to avoid outdoor activities, getting married, or moving to a new house—especially at night. It is thought that if a ghost finds someone in the street and follows them home, they and their family will have bad luck for the next year. People should also avoid bodies of water on Ghost day, since they may be caught and drowned by a Shuǐ Guǐ (水鬼), a ghost who had died through drowning and wants to return to life. The Ghost Festival shares some similarities with the predominantly Mexican observance of El Día de los Muertos. Due to theme of ghosts and spirits, the festival is sometimes also known as the "Chinese Halloween".

=== Hungry ghosts ===
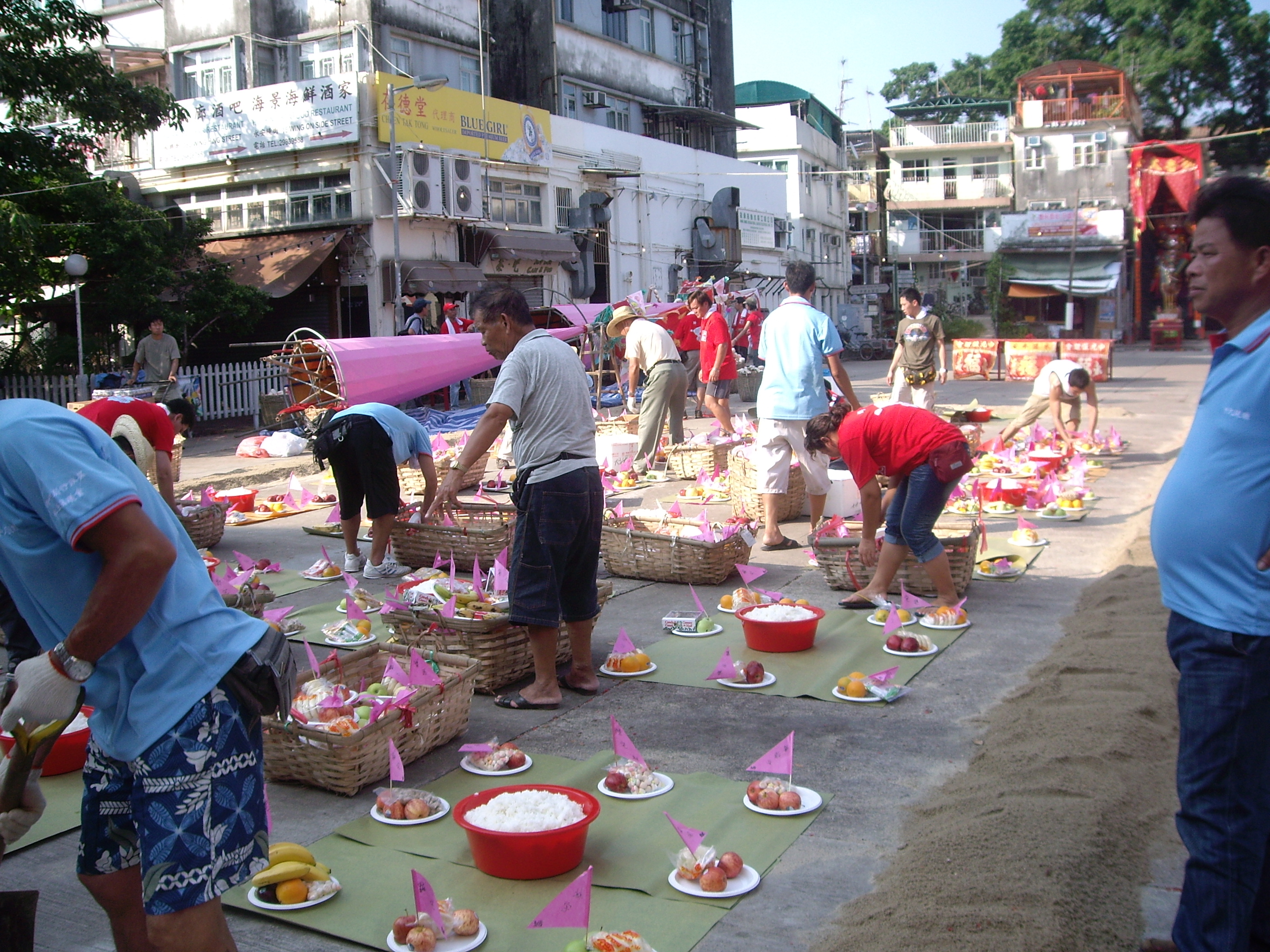
Offerings are prepared for hungry ghosts during Ghost month in Hong Kong.

Hungry ghosts is a Chinese concept that differs from other ghosts in Chinese tradition. Traditional belief is that people become ghosts when they die. It was originally thought that ghosts did not have eternal life, but would slowly weaken and eventually die a second time. Hungry ghosts in traditional thought would only be an issue in exceptional cases such a whole family was killed or when a family no longer appreciated their ancestors. With the rise of popularity in Buddhism the idea that souls would live in space until reincarnation became popular. In the Taoist tradition it is believed hungry ghosts can arise from people whose deaths have been violent or unhappy. Both Buddhism and Taoism share the idea that hungry ghosts can emerge from neglect or desertion of ancestors.

According to the Hua-yen Sutra evil deeds will cause a soul to be born in different realms. There are six possible realms of existence for souls. The highest degree of evil deed will cause a soul to be born into a realm as a denizen of hell, the lower degree of that would cause a soul to be born as an animal, and the lowest degree would cause a soul to be born as a hungry ghost. Evil deeds that lead to becoming a hungry ghost would be killing, stealing, and sexual misconduct. Desire, greed, anger, and ignorance are all factors in causing a soul to be reborn as a hungry ghost because they are motives for people to perform evil deeds. The least serious of these will cause one to have the destiny of becoming a hungry ghost.

=== Miscellany ===
When someone dies, it is important to perform the correct rites to ensure that the departed ancestor does not become a wandering ghost. Since the corpse, or at least the bones, continues to have powers that could affect the fate of living relatives, an expert in feng-shui is needed to determine an auspicious time, place, and orientation of the burial.

In Chinese tradition, a ghost marriage (also known as a Minghun or spirit marriage) is a marriage in which one or both parties are deceased. A ghost marriage was usually set up by the family of the deceased and performed for a number of reasons, including the marriage of a couple previously engaged before one member's death, to integrate an unmarried daughter into a patrilineage, to ensure the family line is continued, or to maintain that no younger brother is married before an elder brother.

As the color of yin forces, the color white is typically associated with ghosts in Chinese tradition.

== In the arts ==
=== Classical literature ===
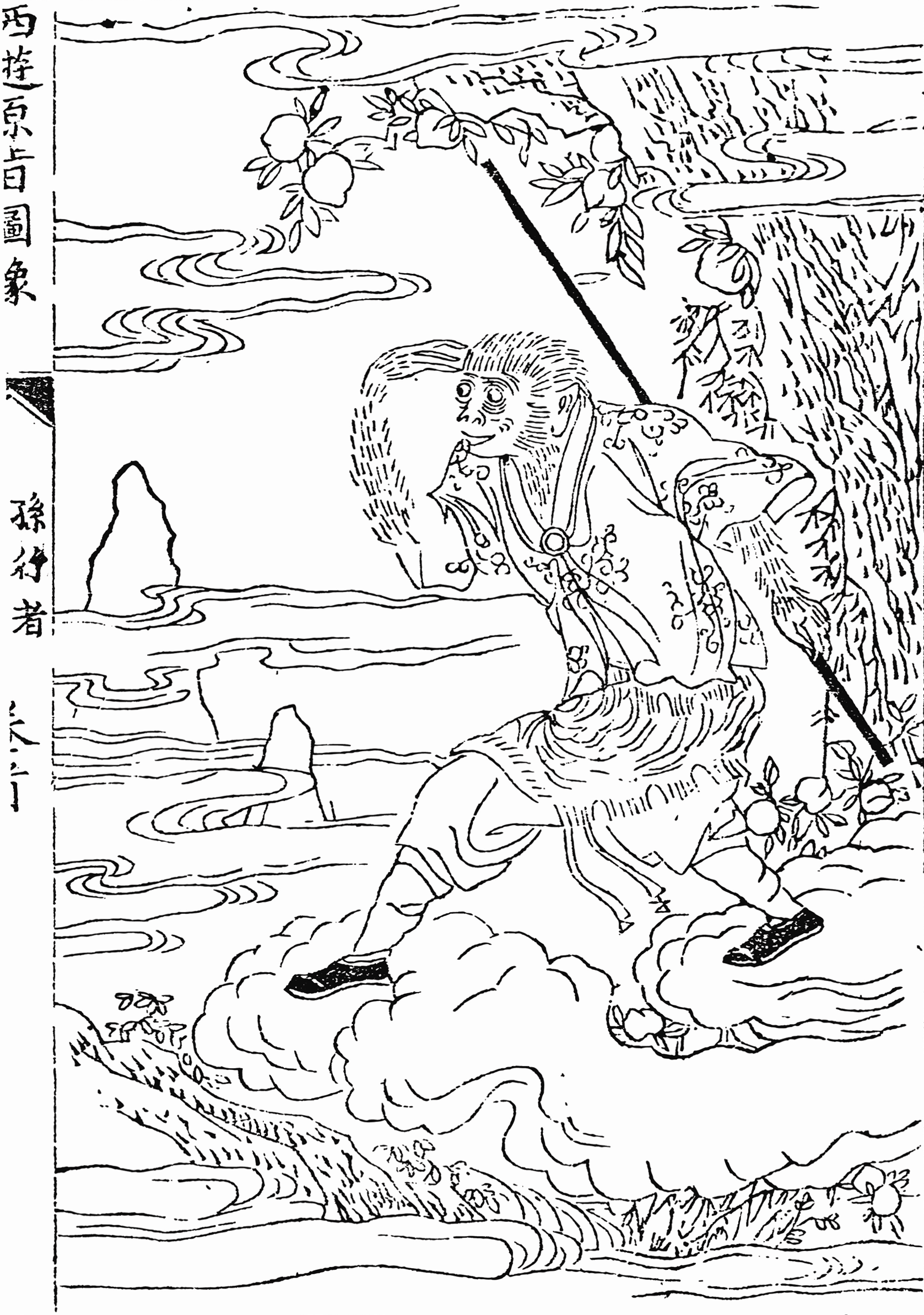
Sūn Wùkōng in Journey to the West

Fengshen Bang ("The Investiture of the Gods") is one of the major vernacular Chinese epic fantasy novels written in the Ming dynasty. The story is set in the era of the declining Shang dynasty and rise of the Zhou dynasty. It intertwines numerous elements of Chinese mythology, including gods and goddesses, immortals and spirits. The novel is prominent in modern Chinese culture and has been adapted into numerous television series and video games, even in Japanese popular culture.

Journey to the West is one of the Four Great Classical Novels of Chinese literature. Originally published anonymously in the 1590s during the Ming dynasty, its authorship has been ascribed to the scholar Wu Cheng'en since the 20th century. It tells the story of the monk Xuánzàng and his quest to bring back Buddhist scriptures from Vulture Peak in India. Although some of the obstacles Xuánzàng encounters are political and involve ordinary human beings, they more frequently consist of run-ins with various goblins and ogres, many of whom turn out to be the earthly manifestations of heavenly beings (whose sins will be negated by eating the flesh of Xuánzàng) or animal-spirits with enough Taoist spiritual merit to assume semi-human forms.

Strange Stories from a Chinese Studio is a collection of nearly five hundred mostly supernatural tales written by Pu Songling in Classical Chinese during the early Qing dynasty. The compilation was first circulated in manuscript form before it was published posthumously. Sources differ in their account of the year of publication. One source claims the "Strange Tales" were published by Pu's grandson in 1740. However, the earliest existing print version today dates to 1766. Pu is believed to have completed the majority of the tales sometime in 1679, though he could have added entries as late as 1707. Other notable collections of supernatural tales that were published later in the Qing dynasty include What the Master Would Not Discuss by Yuan Mei and Notes of the Thatched Abode of Close Observations by Ji Yun.

In the literary tradition, female ghosts are often attributed with excessive yin energy and being prone to haunt the living. Some tales depict such ghosts as appearing beautiful to enchant young men to drain life essences so that the ghosts can resurrect themselves.

=== Movies ===
The theme of ghosts is popular in Chinese cinema, including films made in Hong Kong, Singapore and the mainland. A Chinese Ghost Story is a 1987 Hong Kong romantic comedy-horror film starring Leslie Cheung, Joey Wong, and Wu Ma, directed by Ching Siu-tung, and produced by Tsui Hark. The story is loosely based on a short story in Strange Stories from a Chinese Studio. It was a huge success in Hong Kong, South Korea and Japan and sparked a trend of folklore ghost films in the Hong Kong film industry. The movie won many awards. Ten years later, A Chinese Ghost Story: The Tsui Hark Animation was based on the same story. The first Chinese animated feature film from Hong Kong, it was produced by Tsui Hark and his production company, Film Workshop.

Chinese ghost movies may have more modern themes. The Ghost Inside is a 2005 Chinese horror film directed by Herman Yau, and starring Mainland actors, Liu Ye and Gong Beibi and Taiwanese actress Barbie Shu. The film was produced by the China Film Group and at the time of its filming was the most expensive horror film ever made in mainland China. It tells the story of a young mother fleeing an abusive husband who moves into an apartment haunted by the previous occupants, a mother who had thrown her daughter out of the window before jumping to her death herself.

The Eye is a 2002 Hong Kong-Singaporean-Thai horror film directed by the Pang brothers. The film spawned two sequels by the Pang brothers, The Eye 2 and The Eye 10. The film is based on the story of a young woman who receives an eye transplant, which gives her supernatural powers. There are two remakes of this film, Naina, made in 2005 in India and The Eye, a 2008 Hollywood production starring Jessica Alba and produced by Peter Chan and Paula Wagner.

The Maid is a 2005 Singaporean horror film telling of a maid recently arriving from the Philippines. She has to acclimate herself to the customs of the Chinese Ghost Month, during which she struggles with supernatural forces. The maid is employed by a Teochew opera family, a family with many secrets, who give her a place to stay in their dilapidated shophouse. The film broke the box office record in Singapore for the horror genre, won the European Fantastic Film Festival Federation Asian Film Award at the 10th Puchon International Fantastic Film Festival (PiFan).

Marry My Dead Body is a 2022 Taiwanese LGBTQ+ action comedy that centered around a ghost marriage.

=== Television ===
In the television series The X-Files, 1996, Season 3, Episode 19 entitled Hell Money a story of Chinese ghost culture is spun around a black market organ procurement scheme.

The Teenage Psychic is a Taiwanese mini-series that ran from 2017-2019 about a young medium who communicates with ghosts. It is a fun look into Taiwanese high school life and Taiwanese ghost culture.

== See also ==
- Chinese ancestral worship
- Chinese folk religion
- Culture of China
- Chinese mythology
- Chinese spiritual world concepts
- List of reportedly haunted locations in China
- List of supernatural beings in Chinese folklore
- Preta
- Religion in China
