= Clara Wing-chung Ho =

Academic

Clara Wing-chung Ho (Chinese: 劉詠聰; Jyutping: Lau Wing Cung; also known as Clara Lau) is a history professor at Hong Kong Baptist University. Ho is a Fulbright Scholar and a Fellow of the Hong Kong Academy of the Humanities.

== Career ==
Ho has been Professor of History at the Hong Kong Baptist University for over 20 years. Her writings cover a variety of subjects, but Ho mainly focuses on women and gender in Imperial China. She has collaborated with international scholars on the history of women and gender, with those collaborations including a 2007 conference about the history of Chinese women and a 2010 workshop about gender in the history of China. Ho is the author of multiple books about women and the history of China. She is a Fulbright Scholar and has received the RGC-Fulbright Senior Research Award. Ho was a visiting professor at Northeastern University in Boston, Massachusetts from 2012 to 2013. Ho is a Fellow of the Hong Kong Academy of the Humanities.

It is her belief that "a thorough study of women’s views on different aspects of history, and a multi-angled comparison with men’s views, will provide a unique view of China’s past". A review of her book Occupational Health and Social Estrangement in China was published in the academic journal Work, Employment & Society.
