= Shaoshi Wenjian Lu =

The Wenjian Lu (聞見錄; "Records of Hearsay") is an 1132 Chinese biji book by Shao Bowen (邵伯溫) during the Song dynasty. The book is usually called Shaoshi Wenjian Lu (邵氏聞見錄; "Shao's Records of Hearsay") to distinguish from a contemporary book of the same title and genre (generally called Sichao Wenjian Lu). In the Qing dynasty, the book was included in the collection Siku Quanshu.

The book contains 20 chapters (scrolls) with a supplement by Shao Bowen's son Shao Bo (邵博). Included in the book are historical, political, and intellectual stories from the Song dynasty, especially from Wang Anshi's reforms during Emperor Shenzong of Song's reign. The last part of the book is dedicated to Shao Bowen's father Shao Yong.
