= Douglas Kerr =

British writer and literary academic (born 1951)

Professor Douglas Kerr
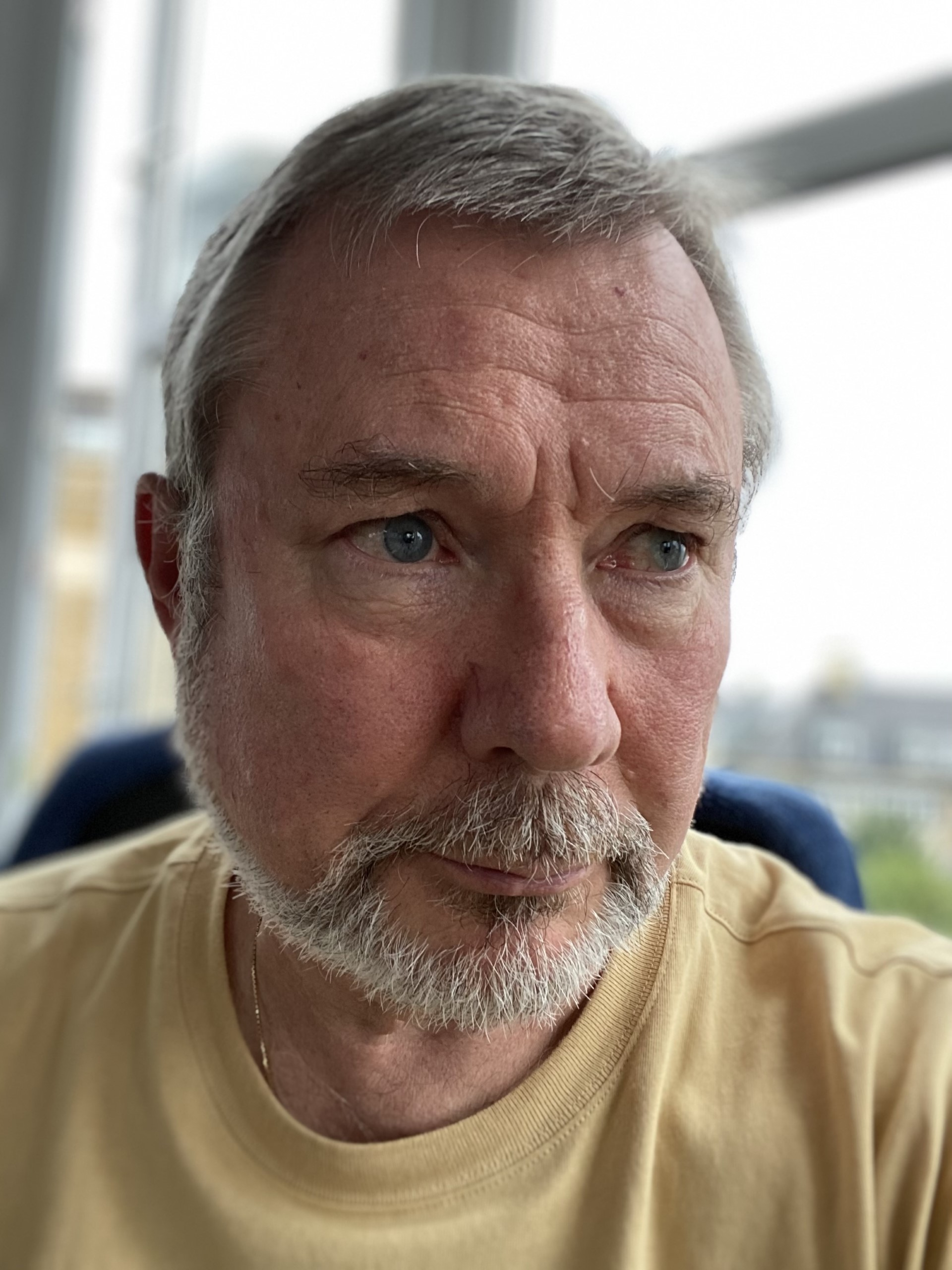
- Professor Kerr at home 2023
- Born: 1951 (age 74–75); Broughty Ferry, Dundee, Scotland
- Education: Cambridge University, Warwick University
- Occupations: Writer and Professor in Modern and Contemporary Literature
- Notable work: Conan Doyle: Writing, Profession, and Practice
- Spouse: Elaine Yee Lin Ho

Douglas Kerr is a British writer and academic who is best known for his work on Arthur Conan Doyle and George Orwell.

== Life and works ==
Kerr was born in 1951 in Broughty Ferry, Dundee. Kerr went to school in Scotland, where he started reading Conan Doyle and never stopped. He went on to read English at Trinity College, Cambridge in 1969 before completing his PhD in comparative literature at Warwick University in 1978.

In 1979, Kerr travelled to Hong Kong, where he had obtained an appointment as a lecturer in the Department of English Studies and Comparative Literature at the University of Hong Kong. Over the next 38 years, he advanced his academic career in Hong Kong, appointed associate professor and head of the English Department in 1996, associate Dean of the Faculty of Arts in 2002, Professor of English in 2006 and Dean of the Faculty of Arts in 2014. Apart from his usual academic responsibilities, Kerr's publication record was prolific, and includes around 110 papers, articles and critiques, among them seven edited scholarly volumes, (Note: Most notably A Century of Travels in China: Critical Essays on Travel Writing from the 1840s to the 1940, eds. Douglas Kerr and Julia Kuehn (Hong Kong: Hong Kong University Press, 2007) 232 pp) and five monographs. His main academic focus has been on the literary history of the later Victorian era and the twentieth century, the literature of empire in Asia and its aftermath, and on cultural biography. Kerr's research interests also include the literature of war and of travel, the history of literary modernism, and RGC-funded projects on Arthur Conan Doyle, George Orwell and on Joseph Conrad.

Outside of academia, Kerr contributed to Hong Kong's English-language cultural life by reviewing books for the South China Morning Post and hosting 60 programmes of a talk show, The Big Idea, for Radio Television Hong Kong on cultural, historical and scientific themes. He addressed conferences presenting keynote speeches around the world, promoting excellence in written English with his wife Elaine Ho, also a literary academic. Kerr served on the board of directors of the Hong Kong International Literary Festival and became its chairman from 2009 to 2011, and participated in various BBC Radio programmes featuring the work of Wilfred Owen, George Orwell and Leonard Woolf.

In 2017, Kerr left Hong Kong and is now living and working in the UK. He is the general editor of The Edinburgh Edition of the Works of Arthur Conan Doyle, an ambitious multi-volume project to publish scholarly editions of this author's principal writing in fiction and non-fiction, from the publisher of his alma mater, the Edinburgh University Press. Kerr has also edited two volumes in the edition: Conan Doyle's autobiography Memories and Adventures, never properly edited before, and the novella The Tragedy of the Korosko, published with the dramatic version of the story, The Fires of Fate, and Conan Doyle's hitherto unpublished Nile Journal, covering a journey he made in 1896. (Note: Kerr talked about the editing process in the Cameron Hollyer Memorial Lecture, given at the Toronto Public Library in 2022.Kerr, Douglas (23 September 2022). "WATCH: Professor Kerr talks about the editing process in the Cameron Hollyer Memorial Lecture, given at the Toronto Public Library in 2022" (video). youtube.com. Friends of the ACD Collection.) Kerr continues to be engaged with scholarly editing as well as writing about the work of Doyle, Joseph Conrad, and Orwell. His latest book, Orwell and Empire, was published 2022. (Note: See the discussion “Orwell and Empire”, with Philippe Sands, Kojo Koram and Douglas Kerr, at the Orwell Foundation's Orwell Festival, 2023.Kerr, Douglas (8 June 2023). "WATCH: Professor Kerr discusses "Orwell and Empire" with Philippe Sands, Kojo Koram and Douglas Kerr, at the Orwell Foundation's Orwell Festival" (video). youtube.com. Pushkin House.)

== Books ==
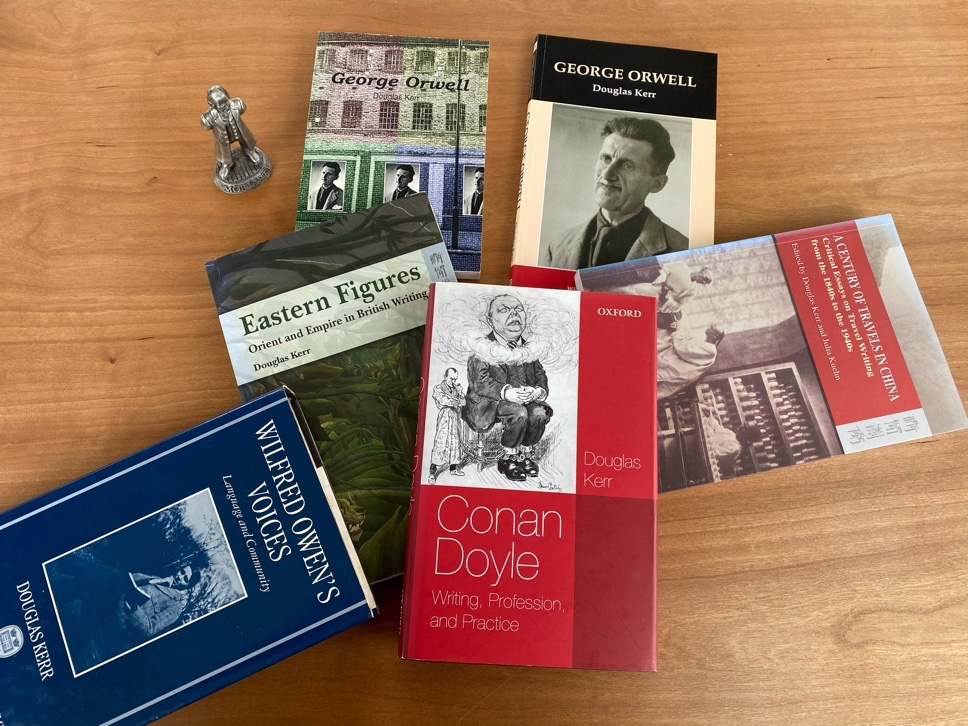
Books written by Douglas Kerr

- Wilfred Owen's Voices (Clarendon Press, 1993)
- George Orwell (Writers and their Works series, 2003)
- A Century of Travels in China: Critical Essays on Travel Writing from the 1840s to the 1940s, co-edited with Julia Kuehn (Hong Kong University Press, 2007)
- Eastern Figures: Orient and Empire in British Writing (Hong Kong University Press, 2008)
- Conan Doyle: Writing, Profession, and Practice (Oxford University Press, 2013)
- Arthur Conan Doyle, Memories and Adventures, edited
- Orwell and Empire (Oxford University Press, 2022)
- The Tragedy of the Korosko and The Fires of Fate - with The Nile Journal (Oxford University Press, 2026)

== Appointments ==
- 1994 - Visiting Scholar Wolfson College, Oxford
- 2000 - Visiting Research Fellow Royal Holloway, University of London
- 2005-6 - Honorary Research Fellow Birkbeck, University of London
- 2009 – Hong Kong University Output Prize
- 2011 - Elected Foundation Fellow of the Hong Kong Academy of the Humanities
- 2014-15 - Dean of the Faculty of Arts at Hong Kong University
- 2017 - Honorary Professor of English at Hong Kong University
- 2018 - Honorary Research Fellow in the School of Arts, Birkbeck College, University of London
