= Louise Edwards (historian) =

Australian sinologist

Louise Edwards FASSA FAHA FHKAH
- Born: Louise Patricia Edwards

Academic background
- Education: University of Auckland; Murdoch University
- Alma mater: Griffith University
- Thesis: The use of the discourse of sexual equality in Hongxue of the twelve beauties (1979–1989) (1991)

Louise Edwards FASSA FAHA FHKAH is an Australian sinologist. Her work has focused on women and gender issues in China and Asia. As of 2022, she is Emeritus Professor of Chinese History at the University of New South Wales and an honorary professor at both the Australia-China Research Institute and the University of Hong Kong.

== Education ==
Edwards completed a BA at the University of Auckland, followed by a second BA at Murdoch University (1987). In 1991 she graduated from Griffith University with a PhD for her thesis, "The use of the discourse of sexual equality in Hongxue of the twelve beauties (1979–1989)". In addition to these degrees, Edwards spent time at two Chinese universities, the Beijing Language and Culture University and Nanjing University.

== Career ==
Over her career, Edwards has worked at a number of universities including the University of Hong Kong and in Australia at the University of Queensland, Australian National University and Australian Catholic University.

She has written or edited 18 books on women in China and Asia. She was joint editor of volume four of The Cambridge World History of Violence: 1800 to the Present.

As of 2022, she is emeritus professor of Chinese History at the University of New South Wales and an adjunct professor at the Australia-China Research Institute, University of Technology Sydney. She is also an honorary professor at the University of Hong Kong.

Edwards served as president of the Asian Studies Association of Australia from 2015 to 2017. She also edits the Women in Asia publications for that Association.

She was elected a Fellow of the Australian Academy of the Humanities in 2007, of the Academy of the Social Sciences in Australia in 2008 and of the Hong Kong Academy of the Humanities.

== Selected publications ==
=== Books ===
- Edwards, Louise (1994), Men and women in Qing China: Gender in the Red chamber dream, E.J. Brill, ISBN 978-90-04-10123-4
- Edwards, Louise (1995), Recreating the literary canon: Communist critiques of women in the Red chamber dream, Projekt Verlag, ISBN 978-3-928861-46-5
- Roces, Mina; Edwards, Louise, eds. (2009), The politics of dress in Asia and the Americas, Sussex Academic Press (published 2007), ISBN 978-1-84519-155-9
- Edwards, Louise (2008), Gender, politics, and democracy: Women's suffrage in China, Stanford University Press, ISBN 978-0-8047-5688-4
- Edwards, Louise; Roces, Mina, eds. (2009), Women in Asia: Critical concepts in Asian studies, Routledge, ISBN 978-0-415-44528-3
- Edwards, Louise (2016), Women warriors and wartime spies of China, Cambridge University Press, ISBN 978-1-316-53634-6
- Edwards, Louise (11 April 2020), Citizens of beauty: Drawing democratic dreams in republican China, University of Washington Press (published 2020), ISBN 978-0-295-74703-3
