= Notes of the Thatched Abode of Close Observations =

Collection compiled by Ji Yun

- A 1926 edition of Notes of the Thatched Abode of Close Observations
- Author: Ji Yun
- Original title: 閱微草堂筆記
- Language: Classical Chinese
- Genre: Zhiguai; Biji
- Publication date: 1800
- Publication place: China
- Media type: Print

Notes of the Thatched Abode of Close Observations
- Traditional Chinese: 閱微草堂筆記
- Simplified Chinese: 阅微草堂笔记
- Literal meaning: Notes of the Thatched Abode of Close Observations
Transcriptions
Standard Mandarin
- Hanyu Pinyin: Yuèwēi cǎotáng bǐjì

Notes of the Thatched Abode of Close Observations (Chinese: 閱微草堂筆記; pinyin: Yuèwēi cǎotáng bǐjì), also translated as Random Jottings from the Cottage of Close Scrutiny and Fantastic Tales By Ji Xiaolan, is a collection of purportedly true supernatural stories compiled by Qing Dynasty scholar-official Ji Yun. Roughly comprising 1,200 entries, the majority of Ji's stories were collected from his friends and colleagues. Others were based on his own experiences during childhood and encounters during the course of his long official career.

== Publication history ==
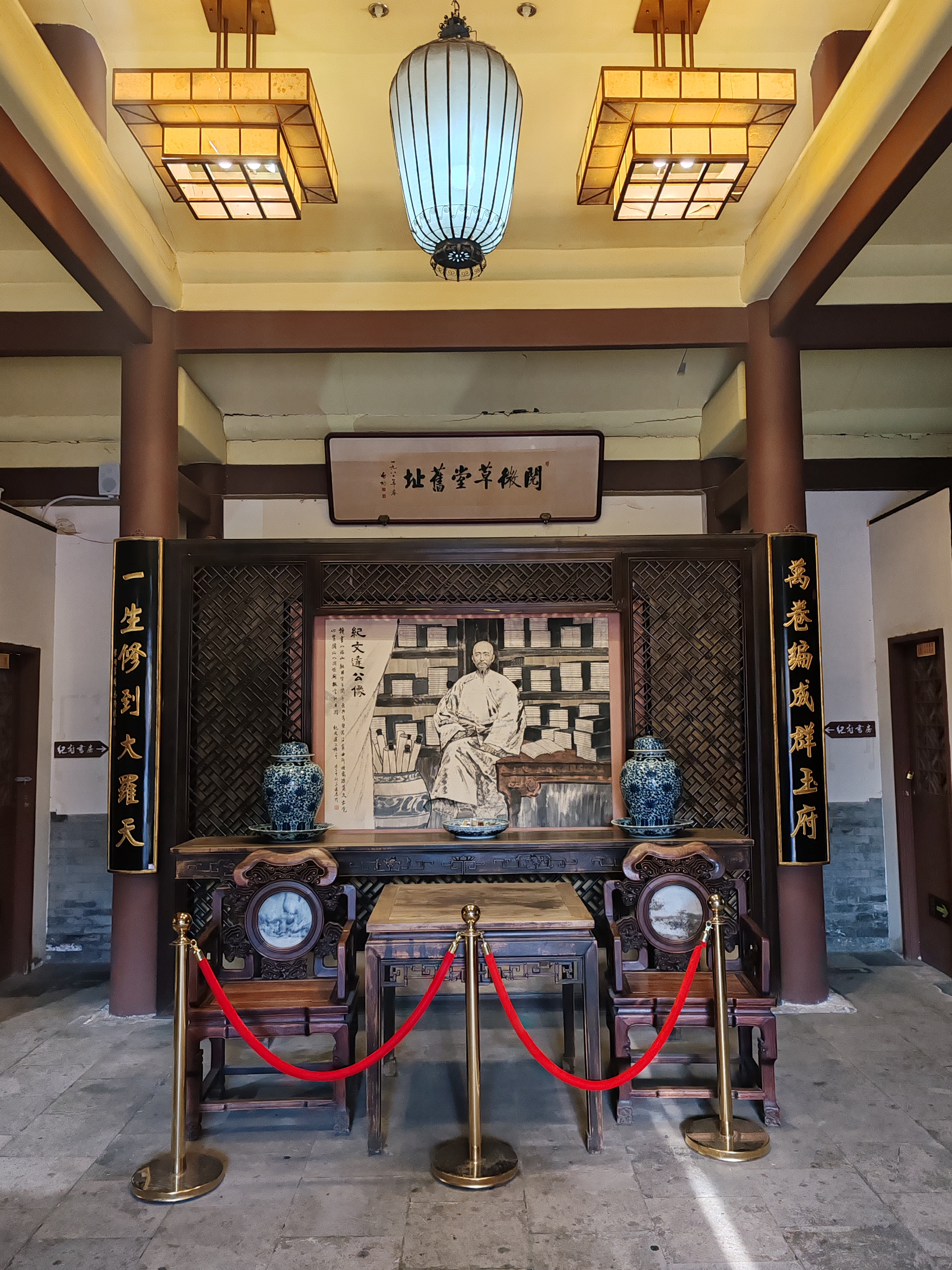
Site of Yuewei Caotang in Beijing

Ji Yun published five volumes of supernatural stories from 1789 to 1798: Written to Pass the Season at the Summer Resort (灤陽消夏錄) in 1789, So Have I Heard (如是我聞) in 1791, Jottings from My Haidian Lodging (槐西雜誌) in 1792, No Harm in Listening (姑妄聽之) in 1793, and More from the Summer Resort (灤陽續錄) in 1798. In 1800, his student, Sheng Shiyan, amalgamated the volumes into a single collection,Yuewei caotang biji, named after Ji's studio.

== Stories ==
The stories in the Notes feature many supernatural beings, cryptids and concepts from Chinese folklore, including jiangshi, hulijing and yeren, in addition to ghosts and spirits.

== Literary significance ==
According to Leo Tak-Hung Chan, the Notes is the 'most voluminous zhiguai collection in late imperial China' as well as one of the most misunderstood. Most of the tales collected by Ji were contributed by his friends and acquaintances, many of whom were distinguished government officials, scholars, and members of gentry. As such, Chan argued that the Notes provides unique insight into how the cultural elite of eighteenth-century China viewed the supernatural, complicating popular notions that the Chinese elite during this period were just 'Confucian rationalists'.

== Select translations ==
=== English ===
- Real Life in China at the Height of Empire: Revealed by the Ghosts of Ji Xiaolan (tr. David Pollard). Chinese University of Hong Kong Press, 2014. ISBN 9629966018.
- Shadows in a Chinese Landscape: The Notes of a Confucian Scholar, (tr. David L. Keenan). M.E. Sharpe, 1999. ISBN 0765639025.
- The Shadow Book of Ji Yun: The Chinese Classic of Weird True Tales, Horror Stories, and Occult Knowledge (tr. Yi Izzy Yu and John Yu Branscum). Empress Wu Books, 2021. ISBN 1953124011.

== See also ==
- Strange Tales from a Chinese Studio
- What the Master Would Not Discuss
