= Yuan Mei =

Chinese painter and poet (1716–1797)

- 袁枚
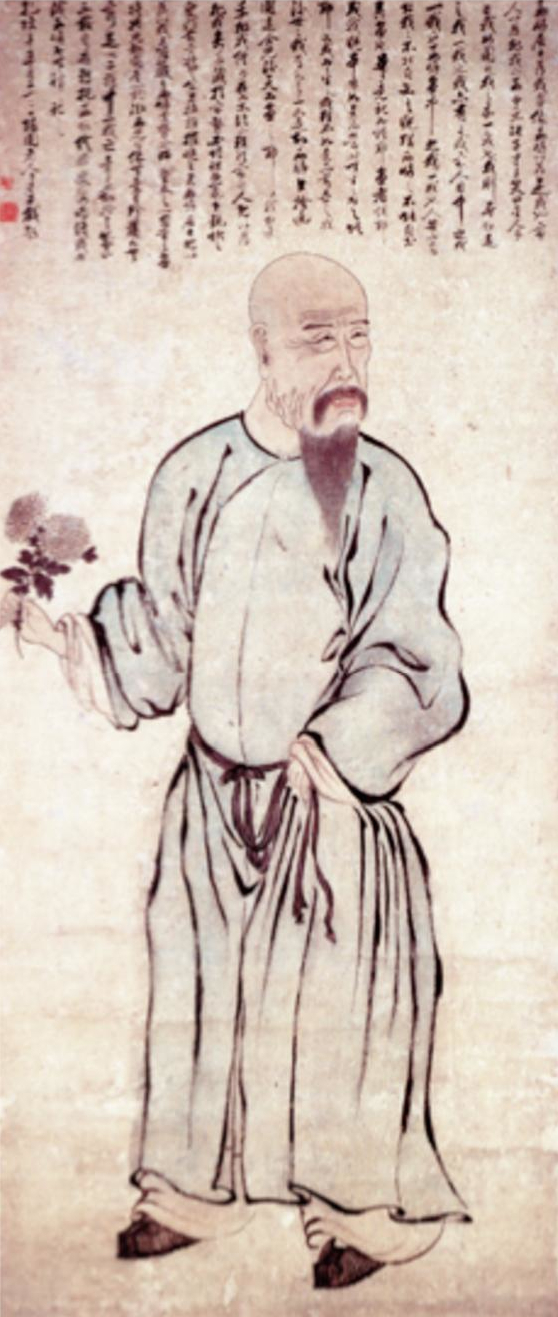
- Yuan Mei Portrait by Luo Ping
- Born: March 25, 1716; Hangzhou, Zhejiang, China
- Died: January 3, 1798 (aged 81); Nanjing, Jiangsu, China
- Education: jinshi degree
- Occupations: Painter, poet
- Notable work: Suiyuan shihua Suiyuan Shidan
- Relatives: Yuan Ji (sister)

Chinese name
- Chinese: 袁枚
Transcriptions
Standard Mandarin
- Hanyu Pinyin: Yuán Méi

Zicai
- Chinese: 子才
Transcriptions
Standard Mandarin
- Hanyu Pinyin: Zǐcaí

Jianzhai
- Traditional Chinese: 簡齋
- Simplified Chinese: 简斋
Transcriptions
Standard Mandarin
- Hanyu Pinyin: Jiǎnzhaī

Cangshan Jushi
- Traditional Chinese: 倉山居士
- Simplified Chinese: 仓山居士
- Literal meaning: Mount Cang Householder
Transcriptions
Standard Mandarin
- Hanyu Pinyin: Cāngshān Jūshì

Suiyuan Zhuren
- Traditional Chinese: 隨園主人
- Simplified Chinese: 随园主人
- Literal meaning: Owner of Sui Garden
Transcriptions
Standard Mandarin
- Hanyu Pinyin: Suíyuán Zhǔrén

Suiyuan Laoren
- Traditional Chinese: 隨園老人
- Simplified Chinese: 随园老人
- Literal meaning: Old Man of Sui Garden
Transcriptions
Standard Mandarin
- Hanyu Pinyin: Suíyuán Lăorén

Yuan Mei (Chinese: 袁枚; pinyin: Yuán Méi; 1716–1797) was a Chinese poet and artist. He was often mentioned with Ji Yun as the "Nan Yuan Bei Ji" (Chinese: 南袁北紀; pinyin: nányuán běijì; lit. 'Yuan of the south and Ji of the north').

== Biography ==
=== Early life ===
Yuan Mei was born in Qiantang (錢塘, in modern Hangzhou), Zhejiang province, to a cultured family who had never before attained high office. He achieved the degree of jinshi in 1739 at the young age of 23 and was immediately appointed to the Hanlin Academy (翰林院). Then, from 1742 to 1748, Yuan Mei served as a magistrate in four different locations in Jiangsu. However, in 1748, shortly after being assigned to administer part of Nanjing, he resigned his post and returned to his hometown to pursue his literary interest.

=== Literary career ===
In the decades before his death, Yuan Mei produced a large body of poetry, essays and paintings. His works reflected his interest in Chan Buddhism and the supernatural, at the expense of Daoism and institutional Buddhism - both of which he rejected. Yuan is most famous for his poetry, which has been described as possessing "unusually clear and elegant language". His views on poetry as expressed in the Suíyuán Shīhuà (隨園詩話) stressed the importance of personal feeling and technical perfection. In his later years, Yuan Mei came to be called "Mister Suiyuan" (Chinese: 隨園先生; pinyin: suíyuán xiānsheng). Among his other collected works are treatises on passing the imperial examinations and on food.

Throughout his lifetime, Yuan Mei travelled extensively throughout southern China, visiting Huangshan, Guilin, Tiantai, Wuyi and other famous mountains. On some of those visits, Yuan kept journal entries, representative of which is the You Guilin zhu shan't ji ("Record of tours of the mountains of Guilin"). He also accepted students. Since he admired women's poetry, he also took several female students and helped them publish their work under their own names.

=== Beliefs and women's literacy ===
Yuan was opposed to the strict moral and aesthetic norms of his day, and valued creativity and self-expression. He advocated for women's literacy. Yuan was both famed and criticized for his Sui Garden, where women would gather to compose and recite poetry. Two of Yuan's sisters enjoyed praise for their literary talent.

== Wonder tales ==
His anthology of supernatural tales, the Zi buyu (子不語 lit. "What the Master does not Speak of", a.k.a. "Censored by Confucius") was first published 1788, and later retitled Xin Qi xie (新齊諧; "New wonder tales from Qi"). It contained some 747 tales, followed by a sequel anthology.

The work is classified under the biji fiction genre, but they are anecdotes collected over many years, purporting to be actual events recorded by the author.

== Gastronomic work ==
The food writer Fuchsia Dunlop has described Yuan as "China’s Brillat-Savarin," and Endymion Wilkinson called him one of the four classical gastronomes. In a time when the taste among his contemporaries was for opulence and exotic display, Yuan stood for the "orthodox" style. "Nowadays," he wrote, "at the start of the feast the menu is about a hundred feet long". This is "mere display, not gastronomy". After one such dinner Yuan returned home and cooked congee to appease his hunger. He instructed cooks "do not fuss with the natural state of the food just to show that you are a clever cook. Bird's nest is beautiful -- why shape it into balls?" Yuan criticized his contemporary Li Liweng's magnolia pudding as "created by artifice". Yuan also resented what he regarded as the corruption of Chinese food by Manchu cooks. The appeal of Manchu cooking was in their stews and roasts, while Chinese cooked broths and soups, but when Manchus serve Chinese dinners and Chinese serve Manchu food, "we lose our originality" and we "toady to each other".

Yuan published his recipes and thoughts on cooking in his 1792 gastronomic manual and cookbook The Way of Eating. A complete and annotated translation was published in 2019.

== Homosexual tendencies ==
The poet is also known for his advocacy regarding male beauty, where he was in agreement with the opinion of Zheng Xie, who was an antagonist of his. An acquaintance of Yuan Mei reported the poet had "many male favorites" (in Chinese called nanchong (男寵) or waichong (外寵))".

== Editions and translations ==
- Yuan Mei, Yingzhong Wang and Yingzhi Wang, eds. 随园食单 (Sui Yuan Shi Dan). Nanjing: Feng huang chubanshe, 2006. ISBN 978-7-80643-493-2.

translations

- —— (2018). Recipes from the Garden of Contentment: Yuan Mei's Manual of Gastronomy. Translated by Chen, Sean Jy-Shyang. Introduction by Nicole Mones. Great Barrington, MA: Berkshire. ISBN 9781614728528.
- Yuan, Mei (2017), Campbell, Duncan (ed.), "Yuan Mei's Garden of Accommodation", China Heritage Annual, translated by Campbell, Duncan, Wairarapa Valley, New Zealand
- —— (2019). The Way of Eating: Yuan Meí's Manual of Gastronomy. Translated by Chen, Sean Jy-Shyang. Introduction by Nicole Mones. Great Barrington, MA: Berkshire. ISBN 9781614728276.
- Yüan, Mei (1996). Censored by Confucius: Ghost Stories by Yuan Mei. Translated by Kam, Louie; Edwards, Louise P. Armonk, NY: M.E. Sharpe. ISBN 1563246805.
  - —— (2016) [1996]. Censored by Confucius: Ghost Stories by Yuan Mei. Translated by Kam, Louie; Edwards, Louise P. Routledge. ISBN 1315285711.
- Yuan, Mei (2003), Harmony Garden: The Life, Criticism, and Poetry of Yuan Mei, translated by Schmidt, J. D., Routledge, ISBN 1138863416
- —— (1997), I Don't Bow to Buddhas: Selected Poems of Yuan Mei, translated by Seaton, J.P., Port Townsend: Copper Canyon Press, ISBN 1-55659-120-9
