= Wen Shen =

Traditional Chinese deities

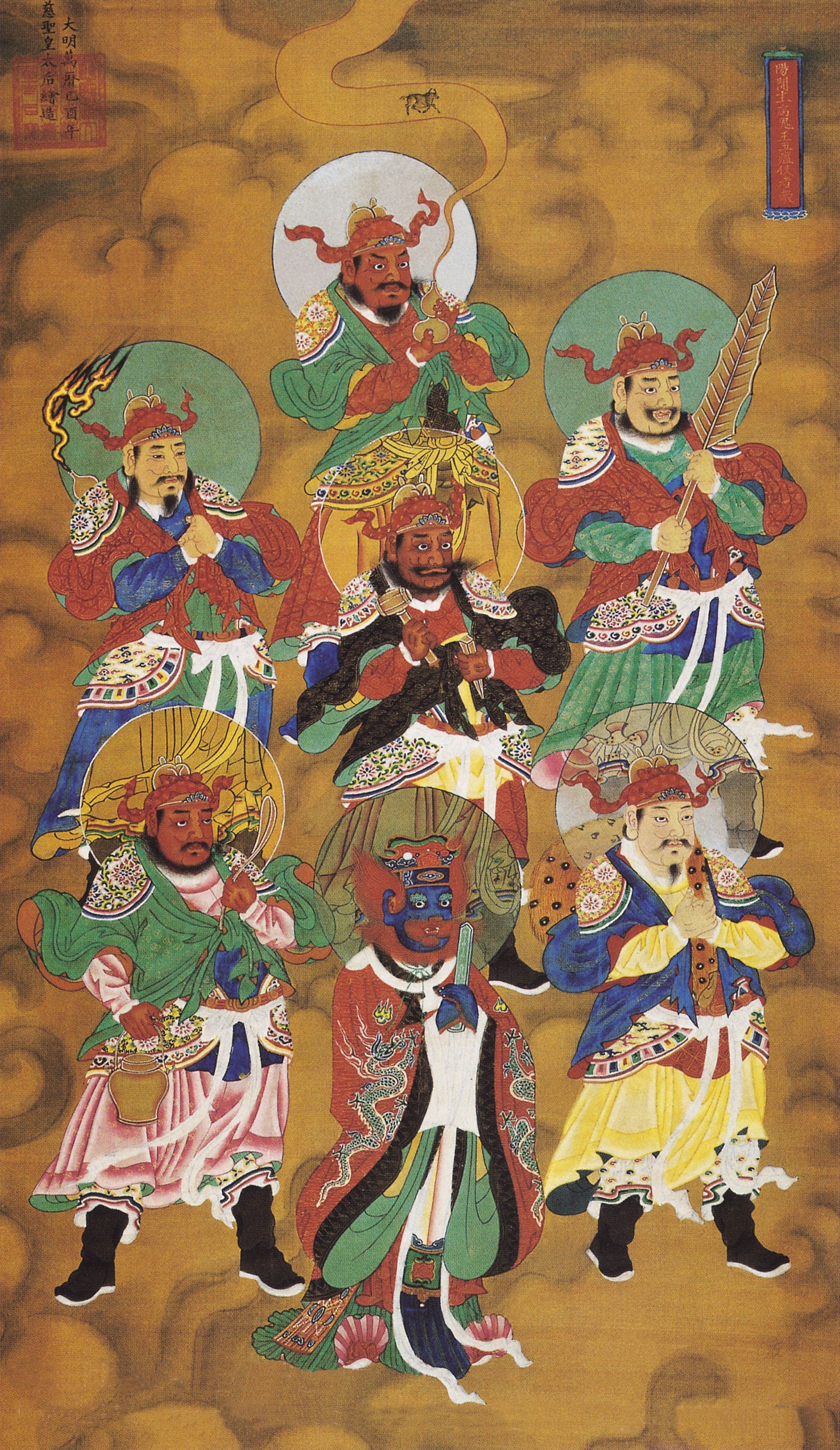
Qing Dynasty Shuilu ritual painting of the Five Masters of Plague and Ghost and Pestilence King

Wen Shen (Chinese: 瘟神) is a deity or group of deities responsible for illness, plague, and disease in Chinese folk religion. In some belief systems, Wen Shen is identified as a single entity who commands wen spirits; in others, the term is used for a grouping of several distinct deities.

== Description ==
The earliest mention of a group of pestilence gods in Chinese mythology is from the Li wei xi ming zheng 禮緯稽命證, an apocryphal Confucian commentary dating from the Han dynasty. This describes three sons of the Emperor Zhuanxu, all three of whom died at birth and became spirits of disease. Over time, these spirits became conflated with the "five wet ghosts" 五濕鬼 of the Longyu hetu 龍魚河圖 and formed the basis for later groupings of pestilence gods.

The term Wen Shen is used to refer to the Five Commissioners of Pestilence 五瘟使者. The Five Commissioners, who governed Heaven's Ministry of Epidemics, were Zhang Yuanbo 張元伯, Liu Yuanda 劉元達, Zhao Gongming 趙公明, Zhong Shigui 鍾仕貴, and Shi Wenye 史文業. The first four were associated with the four seasons (spring, summer, autumn, and winter respectively) while Shi Wenye was associated with the center and was the superior god of pestilence. In the Zhengyi wensi bi dushen dengyi 正一瘟司辟毒神燈儀, which dates from the Tang dynasty, the five gods are associated with the points of the compass.

In traditional Chinese folk beliefs, Wen Shen was believed to release plagues and pestilence upon the world in punishment for the misdeeds of humanity and prayers or offerings were necessary to placate them. Sometimes the placatory rituals would be performed by an entire community. An alternative to offerings was to use a model boat to symbolically carry the pestilence away; this was a tradition of the Wen Shen cult in Taiwan. As another alternative, the Taoist exorcist Lu Shizhong claimed that the deities could be exorcised by simply calling their name three times. Many temples were established to honor and propitiate these deities. In 1960, there were over such 730 temples recorded in Taiwan alone.

Crab apples were regarded as talismans against Wen Shen.
