= Ro-langs =

Undead creature from Tibetan folklore

A ro-langs (Tibetan: རོ་ལང) is a zombie-like creature from Tibetan folklore. Ro is the word for corpse and Langs is the perfect tense of "to rise up", so Ro-Langs literally means "a risen corpse". A ro-langs is usually created by a gdon spirit, or a sorcerer. A ro-langs cannot speak or bend over, it signals its victims by wagging its tongue back and forth. They can not bend any joints, which makes them walk with a stiff-armed lurch. In regions of Tibet there are low doorways to keep the ro-langs out.

== Types ==
=== Tantric ===
The tantric types of ro-langs are raised from the dead through a ritual for personal reasons, such as to serve a necromancer and satisfy his lust for the power of the occult. A religious history written by Kun-dga'- snying-po contains one example. Na-ra-da gained mystical powers and set off to raise a ro-langs. He enlisted the help of a Buddhist Votary. When the tongue was cut off of the ro-langs, it turned into a sword of occult power, and the body turned into gold. The tantric type resembles the voodoo zombie.

=== Demonic ===
Demonic ro-langs are created by an evil spirit with the goal of contaminating other humans; they are independent, and do not serve a master. They are created by either a gdon spirit that has broken its oath and become evil, or a bgegs spirit, which is already evil. Once the consciousness has left the body, the evil spirit enters the body before it is buried. Demonic ro-langs have the power to infect other humans by touching them on the head. The idea of this type of ro-lang has helped shape the zombie in the film industry.

== Storytelling ==
According to American scholar and Tibetologist Turrell Wylie, ro-langs can be described in one of three storytelling formats.

=== Legendary ===
A legendary story consists of an incident that occurred many years ago, and has been told of for centuries. The characters described in the stories are often labeled without names, instead with title such as "mother", "father", "prince", etc. This makes them difficult to trace back to the original event.

=== Epidemic ===
In an epidemic story, a ro-langs rises and infects many people, often in one night. The ro-langs disease is transmitted by a ro-langs touching a person on the head. The story often ends with the ro-langs being defeated.

=== Comatose ===
A comatose story takes place at a definite location, a short time ago. The ro-langs in this story do not contaminate any people and they are quickly dispatched.

Old Tibetan medical practices were not always sufficient for determining if a person is truly dead. Ro-langs in comatose stories have been described as having blue eyes instead of white. This is also a symptom of a person in a comatose state. It is believed that these people "rising from the dead" are actually just waking up from a comatose state.

== Vulnerability ==
Ro-langs cannot be "killed" due to the fact that they have already died, but they can be made to "fall over" (brgyal-ba), a euphemism for killing the undead. The ro-langs can be classified by one of five vulnerabilities:

1. lpags-langs or skin-zombie;
2. khrag-langs or blood-zombie;
3. sha-langs or flesh-zombie;
4. rus-langs or bone-zombie;
5. rme-langs or mole-zombie.

The prefix of the name describes the vulnerability. To make a skin-zombie fall over, one must break the skin. A blood-zombie must bleed, a flesh-zombie must be deeply cut or have flesh removed, a bone-zombie must have a fractured bone, and a mole-zombie is only vulnerable at a mole on the body.

The types of ro-langs above are listed in order of difficulty to defeat. The skin-zombie is considered the easiest to defeat because the skin is easy to break, whereas the mole-zombie is considered to be the most difficult to defeat because of the small area of vulnerability, and the potential for the location of the mole to be unknown to the intended victim.

Ro-langs are unable to bend at the waist; to exploit this weakness, many buildings in early Tibetan architecture were built with very low door frames. The belief was that the Ro-lang, unable to bend, would simply run into the low doorway, and be unable to enter the building.
