= Lu Shizhong =

Daoist exorcist in 12th century China

Lu Shizhong Chinese: 路時中 was a Daoist exorcist in 12th century China, and the founder of the Great Method of the Jade Hall School of Daoism.

Lu was born in Shangsui (now Chenzhou), and was related to the prefecture's magistrate, Lu Guan. At the age of 17, he met a wandering Daoist and learned various talismanic and shamanic arts. In 1120, he had a vision in which he was shown the location of a secret manuscript of the Shangqing School by a student of Zhang Daoling; this manuscript would later form the basis of Lu's main treatise The Great Method of the Jade Hall of the Three Heavens of the Supreme Mysterious Origin (Chinese: 無上玄元三天玉堂大法). Lu used the arts that he had learned to make a living performing rites and exorcisms for wealthy patrons. He founded the Great Method of the Jade Hall School (Chinese: 玉堂大法)
