= Biji (Chinese literature) =

Chinese literary genre

Biji (traditional Chinese: 筆記; simplified Chinese: 笔记; pinyin: bǐjì) is a special literary genre in classical Chinese literature. Literally, it means 'notebook' or 'written notes'. There is no strict writing mode for biji, it is a literary form mainly based on recording personal insights, experiences, miscellaneous sensations, and trifles, and it is known for its characteristics of scattered notes and trivial records. A book of biji can contain stories, anecdotes, quotations, random musings, philological speculations, literary criticism and indeed everything that the author deems worth recording.

== Genre and evolution ==
The genre has a long history back to the early tradition known as "notes on the strange" or zhiguai (traditional Chinese: 志怪小說; simplified Chinese: 志怪小说; pinyin: zhìguài xiǎoshuō) in the Wei–Jin period (3rd to 4th centuries A.D.), and matured during the Tang dynasty. From the Wei–Jin to Tang Dynasties, the Chinese produced many biji which organized ancient knowledge of myriad things in patterns that are different from the more orthodox Song biji. The Wei, Jin, and Northern and Southern Dynasties was a period of political division in Chinese history, and also an era of flourishing culture and art. During this time many various literary genres, including biji flourished. The biji of that period mostly contains believe-it-or-not anecdotes, and many of them can be treated as collections of short fiction. To differentiate this kind of biji fiction from the general biji, the former has been called biji xiaoshuo (筆記小說; 笔记小说; 'notebook fiction').

Biji emerged as an independent literary genre during the Southern Dynasties (420–589) and underwent further refinement during the Tang dynasty (618–907). In addition, the Song Dynasty, known for its extended period of peace in Chinese history, saw stable social and economic development. This stability contributed to a prosperous environment, fostering the flourishing of biji literature during the dynasty's reign from 960 to 1279. Historiographic themes hold significant importance in the biji text of the Song dynasty. Therefore, they serve as crucial resources for the study of Song history. Many works of which adopting an "item-by-item style and stipulated no further rules for the size, structure, or mutual relations of these items", and continued to flourish during the later dynasties up until the end of the 19th century. According to Ronald Egan, the biji as a genre "served as an alternative to the classical commentary and the formal essay" in traditional Chinese letters and allowed writers to record their reflections or scholarly insights freely.

== Characteristics and style ==
Biji is a type of text divided into several categories or sections, known as "Juan" in Chinese. Unlike traditional narrative structures that follow a chronological sequence and include clear beginnings, developments, and endings, Biji literature emphasises personal observations, feelings, and reflections. It often records genuine insights and experiences in daily life through the author's perspective and voice, narrating fragmented segments. This form is characterised by its high flexibility and informality, representing a form of literature that is creative and expressive.

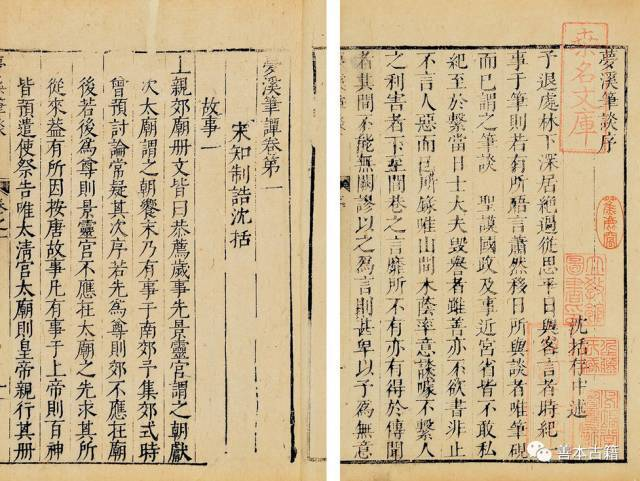
Dream Pool Essays (夢溪筆談), a biji work from the Northern Song period, authored by Shen Kuo.

Traditional literary genres such as poetry, rhapsody, prose, and lyric poetry usually have specific themes and formal requirements. In contrast, biji are often fragmented and episodic, lacking continuous narration or a unified theme, and are not constrained by formal literary structures.

In some instances, the various sections within a biji article may not have explicit headings or rules for classification. Readers, however, will discover an implicit organisational structure through attentive reading. Authors of biji mostly jot down relatively incoherent descriptions and reflections during their leisure time, with each section possibly lacking clear titles and instead being indicated by numerical markers. These sections or categories typically consist of numerous brief annotations, subsequently arranged and categorised based on thematic relevance.

Miscellaneous Morsels from Youyang (酉陽雜俎), a biji work from the Tang dynasty, authored by Duan Chengshi.

Biji literature, as a significant literary genre, has showcased its unique characteristics and styles across different periods.

=== Han Dynasty and the Wei, Jin, Northern, and Southern Dynasties ===
During the Han Dynasty and the Wei, Jin, Northern, and Southern Dynasties, biji literature not only recorded anecdotes but also reflected the social customs and personal insights of the time.

==== Tang and Song Dynasties ====
In the Tang and Song Dynasties, biji works recorded daily trivia and personal experiences, highlighting individual emotions and experiences while reflecting the culture and customs of the society. Biji literature from this period often focused on recording and describing, emphasising factual recording and textual criticism. Authors expressed their observations of society, history, and nature through these notes. Many scholars produced works covering a wide range of themes, including personal life, natural scenery, historical events, and cultural landscapes. For instance, the Tang Dynasty's biji literature, such as Miscellaneous Morsels from Youyang（酉陽雜俎), or the Song Dynasty Casual Records of the Nenggai Studio (能改齋漫錄), contain numerous records of anecdotes and strange events.

==== Ming and Qing Dynasties ====
Notes of the Thatched Abode of Close Observations (閱微草堂筆記), a biji work from the Qing period, authored by Ji Yun.

By the Ming and Qing Dynasties, the content of biji literature included not only anecdotes but also aspects of politics, economy, and culture. Biji works from these periods placed more emphasis on personalized expression and literary quality, featuring strong personal colour and literary creativity. For example, the Qing dynasty's Notes of the Thatched Abode of Close Observations (閱微草堂筆記)" became a representative work of biji literature from this period due to its detailed records and vivid descriptions.

As a free-form literary genre, biji literature is an ideal medium for scholars to express their thoughts and record their lives.

== Influence and legacy ==
Biji occupies an important position in the Chinese literary tradition as a literary form. Through the author's observations of daily life, social customs, and political events, it records key aspects of Chinese society, culture, and history across different periods, and is considered a valuable historical document. It emphasises an informal style and subjective reflection, challenging traditional literary norms and allowing authors to express their thoughts and feelings more freely.

A New Account of the Tales of the World (世说新语)

The authors of biji are typically intellectuals, scholars, or literati who deeply engage with pressing social, political, and cultural issues of their time. Their works provide a platform for critical reflection, social commentary, and intellectual debate. By incorporating innovative narrative and writing techniques such as essays and travel notes, biji blends vivid scenes with profound thought, inspiring contemporary intellectuals and writers. Liu Yiqing's "A New Account of the Tales of the World" uses numerous short stories to reflect the social customs and political attitudes of the aristocratic class during the Eastern Jin Dynasty, revealing the power structures and social ethos of the time. Ji Yun's "Notes of the Thatched Abode of Close Observations" documents various social phenomena and political events of the Qing Dynasty, providing critical reflections on social issues. These works, through their diverse narrative techniques, reveal the social realities and political conditions of different periods, making them essential resources for studying Chinese history and culture.

As a part of the Chinese literary tradition, biji, along with genres like poetry, prose and drama, collectively create a varied literary landscape. Their artistic value and cultural significance have been noted as having an important impact on the literary world and opening new possibilities for the development of contemporary literature.

The diversity of biji makes it difficult to classify them into a specific literary genre, but this flexibility allows biji to occupy a unique position in the history of Chinese literature. They serve as a valuable means to understand the thoughts and social lives of ancient Chinese literati.

== Notable works ==
- Miscellaneous Morsels from Youyang (酉陽雜俎 Yǒuyáng Zázǔ), by Duan Chengshi, Tang dynasty
- Dream Pool Essays (夢溪筆談 Mèngxī Bǐtán) by Shen Kuo, Song dynasty
- Notebooks from the Rong Study (容齋隨筆 Róngzhāi Suíbǐ) by Hong Mai, Song dynasty
- Little Notes on the Nature of Things (物理小識 Wùlǐ Xiǎoshí) by Fang Yizhi, Ming dynasty
- Notes of the Thatched Abode of Close Observations (閱微草堂筆記 Yuèwēi Cǎotáng Bǐjì) by Ji Yun, Qing dynasty
- A New Account of the Tales of the World (世说新语 Shìshuō Xīnyü) by Liu Yiqing, Northern and Southern dynasty
- Baopuzi (抱朴子 Bàopǔzǐ) by Ge Hong, Eastern Jin dynasty
- Soushen Ji (搜神记 Sōushén Jì) by Gan Bao, Eastern Jin dynasty
- Taiping Guangji (太平广记 Tàipíng Guǎngjì), compiled by Li Fang et al., Song dynasty
- Yingchuang Yicao (萤窗异草 Yíngchuāng Yìcǎo) by Qu Dajun, Qing dynasty
- Qingteng Shuwu Biji (青藤书屋笔记 Qīngténg Shūwū Bǐjì) by Wang Shizhen, Ming dynasty
- Little Notes on the Nature of Things (物理小识 Wùlǐ Xiǎoshí) by Fang Yizhi, Ming dynasty
- Strange Stories from a Chinese Studio (聊斋志异 Liáozhāi Zhìyì) by Pu Songling, Qing dynasty
- Zi Bu Yu (子不语 Zǐ Bù Yǔ) by Yuan Mei, Qing dynasty

== Criticism and studies ==
Biji is a valuable resource for understanding cultural practices, social norms, and everyday life in historical China. It captures a wide range of information that formal historical records often overlook. In recent years, there has been a renewed interest in biji both in China and internationally. Modern writers and scholars are exploring biji’s potential to offer fresh perspectives on contemporary issues. The literary and artistic value of biji is often debated. Some scholars argue that biji’s fragmented and anecdotal nature detracts from its literary quality, while others appreciate its unique stylistic features and narrative diversity.

Modern scholars have conducted in-depth research on the biji literature during the Ming and Qing dynasties, considering it to hold a significant position in the history of Chinese literature and profoundly influence later literary works. At the same time, they also re-interpret and evaluate the artistic achievements of biji literature from the perspective of literary criticism. Some critics have pointed out that biji may be subject to the limitations of the narrator’s positions, biases, and experiences, thus potentially carrying subjective undertones, leading to a lack of objectivity and comprehensiveness in the works, and failing to fully reflect the true aspects of society, culture, and history. In addition, many biji works are often fragmented, lacking the coherence and integrity of longer works such as vernacular novels. Compared with traditional literary forms, biji may be relatively simple and potentially lacking depth. Due to their emphasis on realism and documentation, they may sacrifice literary imagination.

== See also ==
- Commonplace book
