= Ji Yun =

Chinese philosopher, politician and writer

Ji Xiaolan 紀曉嵐
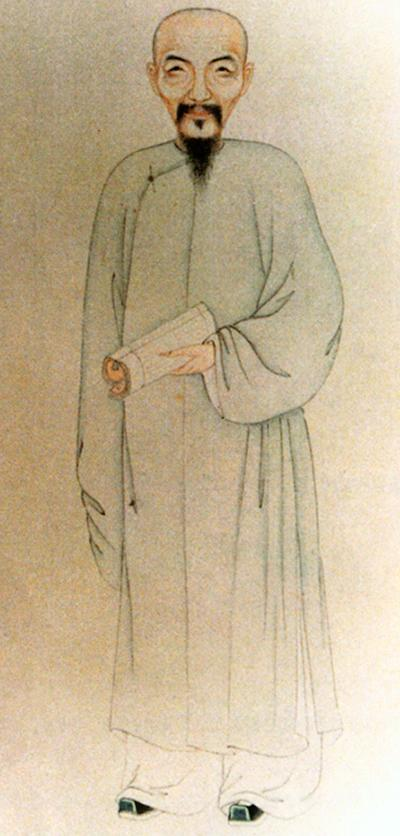

Assistant Grand Secretary
- In office 1805–1805

Minister of Rites
- In office 9 October 1797 – 15 March 1805 Serving with Deming (until 1800), Dachun (1800–1802), Changlin (1802), Yongqing (1802–1803), Nayancheng (1803–1804), Linning (1804), Gūnggala (since 1804)
- Preceded by: Jin Shisong
- Succeeded by: Liu Quanzhi
- In office 22 September 1792 – 5 July 1796 Serving with Changqing (until 1793), Deming (since 1793)
- Preceded by: Liu Yong
- Succeeded by: Jin Shisong
- In office 7 March 1787 – 3 March 1791 Serving with Debao (until 1789), Changqing (since 1789)
- Preceded by: Peng Yuanrui
- Succeeded by: Liu Yong

Minister of War
- In office 5 July 1796 – 13 November 1796 Serving with Qinggui
- Preceded by: Zhu Gui
- Succeeded by: Shen Chu

Personal details
- Born: 26 July 1724 Xian County, Zhili, Qing China
- Died: 14 March 1805 (aged 80) Beijing, Qing China
- Spouse: Lady Ma (died 1795)
- Children: Ji Ruji (born 1743); Ji Ruxi (born 1766); Ji Ruyi (born 1784)
- Parent: Ji Rongsu (father)
- Education: jinshi degree
- Posthumous name: Wenda 文達

Chinese name
- Traditional Chinese: 紀昀
- Simplified Chinese: 纪昀
Transcriptions
Standard Mandarin
- Hanyu Pinyin: Jǐ Yún

Xiaolan
- Traditional Chinese: 曉嵐
- Simplified Chinese: 晓岚
Transcriptions
Standard Mandarin
- Hanyu Pinyin: Xiǎolán

Chunfan
- Chinese: 春帆
Transcriptions
Standard Mandarin
- Hanyu Pinyin: Chūnfān

Shiyun
- Traditional Chinese: 石雲
- Simplified Chinese: 石云
Transcriptions
Standard Mandarin
- Hanyu Pinyin: Shíyún

Guanyi Daoren
- Traditional Chinese: 觀弈道人
- Simplified Chinese: 观弈道人
Transcriptions
Standard Mandarin
- Hanyu Pinyin: Guānyì Dàorén

Ji Yun (simplified Chinese: 纪昀; traditional Chinese: 紀昀; pinyin: Jǐ Yún; 1724–1805), also known as Ji Xiaolan (simplified Chinese: 纪晓岚; traditional Chinese: 紀曉嵐; pinyin: Jǐ Xiǎolán) or Ji Chunfan (Chinese: 紀春帆; pinyin: Jǐ Chūnfān) was a Chinese philosopher, politician, and writer. He was an influential scholar of Qing dynasty China and many anecdotes have been recorded about him. Ji Yun authored Notes of the Thatched Abode of Close Observations (閱微草堂筆記) and Wenda Gong Yiji (紀文達公遺集; "Collected Works of Lord Wenda", i.e. Ji Xiaolan), which was edited by later generations. He was often mentioned with Yuan Mei as the "Nan Yuan Bei Ji" (Chinese: 南袁北紀; lit. 'Yuan of the south and Ji of the north').

== Background ==
Ji Yun was born in Xian County of Zhili province (modern Hebei). When he was young, he was deemed intelligent. His father Ji Rongsu was a civil minister and archaeologist.

== Career ==
In 1747, Ji Yun rose to intellectual prominence after winning the highest distinction in the provincial examinations. Several years later, in 1754, he attained the jinshi degree, whereupon he entered the Hanlin Academy.

Ji Yun's career was not, however, smooth sailing. In 1768, he became an accessory in a bribery case after he tipped off a brother-in-law about the severity of charges pending against him, for which crime he was banished to Dihua in Ili (predecessor of Xinjiang Province).

On his return from Xinjiang, Ji was received by the Qianlong Emperor in 1771 when the ruler happened to be returning from Jehol to Beijing, and he was ordered to write a poem on the return of the Turgut Mongols from the banks of the Volga. Ji's rendition of the inspiring tale of the return of the exiled Mongols, later celebrated in English by poet Thomas de Quincey (1785–1859) in his epic Revolt of the Tartars, delighted the emperor, for whom he became an unofficial poet laureate.He was subsequently assigned to compile the Siku Quanshu.

One year later, Ji Yun was pardoned from his sentence, and, on his return journey in 1771, he wrote a travel account distilled into 160 poems titled Xinjiang zalu (新疆杂录; Assorted verses on Xinjiang). This remains one of the most useful sources in Chinese on life in Xinjiang Province in the late-eighteenth century.

== Personal life ==
He was an avid pipe tobacco smoker. He had a special liking for fatty pork and strong tea and disliked starchy staple foods like rice, potatoes, wheat and corn. He loved women and had many concubines throughout his life. It was said he consummated with five different women every day. He seldom rode sedan chairs and preferred to walk.

In the first year of the Jiaqing Emperor's reign, he was appointed as the secretary of defense. Ji Yun died in his sleep in 1805, aged 81.

During his later years, Ji Yun became one of the three great writers of strange tales in Qing dynasty China (the other two were Pu Songling and Yuan Mei). His tales included "true" weird tales, investigations of paranormal phenomena, as well as horror stories, parables, accounts of strange natural phenomena, and satirical portraits of prominent Neo-Confucian scholars and government officials.

== Achievement ==
- 1747 – Ranked number one provincial graduate (鄉試解元)
- 1754 – Ranked number one graduate of the palace examination (中進士)
- 1773 – Chief editor for the Siku Quanshu, the largest collection of books in Chinese history
- 1796 – Minister of war (兵部尚書)
- 1797 – Minister of Personnel (吏部尚書)

Between 1789 and 1798, Ji Yun published five collections of supernatural tales, and in 1800 the five volumes were produced under the collective title Yuewei Caotang Biji (閱微草堂筆記 or Jottings from the grass hut for examining minutiae).

In addition, Ji Yun was also well known for the magnum opus of Qing editorial achievement, Siku quanshu (The Complete Library in Four Branches); he edited this massive work together with Lu Xixiong, in compliance with an imperial edict issued by the Qianlong Emperor.

== Poetry ==
One poem by Ji Yun is shown below:

=== "A Sail in the Glass" ===
"Countless welcoming good mountains along the river,
My eyes are lit up as soon as I'm out of Hangzhou,
Misty river banks with mixed sky and green,
A sail in the glass."

== Mansion ==
The mansion in which Ji Yun lived for the last thirty years of his life was originally the residence of General Yue Zhongqi (1686–1754), the twenth-first generational descendant of the renowned anti-Jurchen Jin, Song dynasty loyalist and general Yue Fei, who is one of the most renowned figures in Chinese history. General Yue fought alongside General Nian Gengyao in quelling Tibetan rebels in what is today Qinghai, and was highly honoured in Beijing. He never lived for very long in the capital, his base being in Sichuan and Gansu. However, he was rewarded for his service to the throne by the Kangxi Emperor and raised to the position of duke of the third class.

Ji Yun lived in the mansion for thirty years and several features of the dwelling that the visitor can still see today are associated with him. A tree in the garden is said to be more than two hundred years old. Few original items from the time of Ji Yun remain in the house but the caretaker claims that the desk and mirror in the main study are original items. The glass mirror in the zitan timber frame is one of the earliest mirrors produced with lead paint in China.

After Ji Xiaolan's death, his descendants rented half of the mansion complex out to Huang Antao (1777–1847), a jinshi scholar, Hanlin scholar and poet, like Ji Yun. Huang was a renowned calligrapher; several of his calligraphic pieces are in the collection of the Palace Museum.

== Popular culture ==
Ji, portrayed by Zhang Guoli, is the titular character in the mainland Chinese TV series The Eloquent Ji Xiaolan. The series mainly center around Ji, his rival Heshen (portrayed by Wang Gang), the Qianlong Emperor (portrayed by Zhang Tielin), along with court events in the Qing dynasty. Unlike slim Zhang however, the real Ji Yun was known for being obese in stature.

== Bibliography ==
- Yu, Yi I. and John Yu Branscum, editors and translators. The Shadow Book of Ji Yun: The Chinese Classic of Weird True Tales, Horror Stories, and Occult Knowledge. Empress Wu Books, 2021.
- Pollard, David (trans.). Real Life in China at the Height of Empire. Revealed by the Ghosts of Ji Xiaolan. Hong Kong: The Chinese University Press, 2014. ISBN 978-962-996-601-0. A recent (as of 2015) translation of selected notes from the Yuewei caotang biji.
- Chan, Leo Tak-hung. The Discourse on Foxes and Ghosts: Ji Yun and Eighteenth-Century Literati Storytelling. Hong Kong: The Chinese University Press, 1998. ISBN 9622017495.
- Hummel, Arthur W. Sr., ed. (1943). "Chi Yün" . Eminent Chinese of the Ch'ing Period. United States Government Printing Office.
