= Hong Kong Academy of the Humanities =

The Hong Kong Academy of the Humanities
- Abbreviation: HKAH
- Founded: 2011
- Location: Hong Kong
- Region served: Humanities
- Key people: Maureen Sabine, President; John Carroll, Vice-President; Bernadette Watson, Secretary; Winnie Cheng, Treasurer
- Website: humanities.hk

Hong Kong Academy of the Humanities
- Traditional Chinese: 香港人文學院
Transcriptions
Yue: Cantonese
- Yale Romanization: Hēung góng yàhn màhn hohk yuhn
- Jyutping: Hoeng1 gong2 jan4 man4 hok6 jyun6

The Hong Kong Academy of the Humanities (HKAH) is a cross-institutional body of scholars in the humanities based in Hong Kong. The Academy was established in April 2011 with 39 foundation fellows drawn from Hong Kong's eight institutions of higher education funded by the University Grants Committee. Its constitution was promulgated at the 2012 AGM.

== Goals ==
- To recognise scholarly achievement in the humanities in Hong Kong;
- To promote appreciation of the value of the humanities;
- To provide a platform for advocacy on behalf of the humanities to government, funding bodies, business and the general public;
- To provide a point of contact for government and international bodies seeking information about the humanities in Hong Kong.

== Activities ==
- The HKAH has two book prize, The First Book Prize and The Martha Cheung Book Prize in Translation.

In 2015, the First Book Prize was won by Catherine Ladds of Hong Kong Baptist University for her book Empire Careers: Working for the Chinese Customs Service 1854–1949, published in 2014 by Manchester University Press. The runner up was Dennis Tay of Hong Kong Polytechnic University for his book Metaphor in Psychotherapy: A Descriptive and Prescriptive Analysis published in 2013 by John Benjamins.

The HKAH has held the following symposia:

- The Future of the Humanities and China, in conjunction with the University of Hong Kong in October 2011
- The Humanities and Public Discourse, in conjunction with Chinese University of Hong Kong November 2011
- Søren Kierkegaard and Chinese Culture, in conjunction with Hong Kong Baptist University May 2013
- What Money Can't Buy—Professor Michael Sandel in conjunction with Chinese University of Hong Kong March 2016

== Fellows ==
Fellows in the Hong Kong Academy of the Humanities are recognized by their peers as scholars of the highest academic distinction, or eminent practitioners of the arts, and honored for their lifetime contribution to the humanities. Early Career Fellows (previously referred to as Junior Fellows) are early to mid-career scholars who show exceptional promise in their humanities discipline. Overseas Fellows are Fellows who were formerly based in Hong Kong and have taken up posts abroad.

New Fellows are nominated on an annual basis by nomination and secret ballot of members.

Founding Secretary, Professor David Parker (1943–2015) of Chinese University of Hong Kong's Research Centre for Human Values, died on 29 October 2015 and served as Vice-President of the HKAH at the time.

== Affiliations ==
The Academy has sister relationships with other national academy bodies around the world, including the Union Académique Internationale and the Australian Academy of the Humanities.

== Other international scholarly academies ==
- Australian Academy of the Humanities (Official website)
- Academy of the Social Sciences in Australia (Official website)
- British Academy
- Royal Society of Canada Official website
- Royal Society of Edinburgh, Scotland
- Royal Swedish Academy of Letters, History and Antiquities Official website
