= What the Master Would Not Discuss =

Collection of supernatural stories

- Cover of a 1934 edition of What the Master Would Not Discuss
- Author: Yuan Mei
- Original title: 子不語
- Language: Chinese
- Genre: Biji, Gods and demons fiction, supernatural, fantasy, adventure
- Publication date: 1788 CE
- Publication place: Qing dynasty China
- Media type: Print

What the Master Would Not Discuss
- Traditional Chinese: 子不語
- Simplified Chinese: 子不语
- Literal meaning: master not discuss
Transcriptions
Standard Mandarin
- Hanyu Pinyin: zǐ bù yǔ
- Wade–Giles: tzu^{1}-bu^{4}-yu^{3}
Yue: Cantonese
- Yale Romanization: jí bāt yúh
- Jyutping: zi2 bat1 jyu5

Alternative Chinese name
- Traditional Chinese: 新齊諧
- Simplified Chinese: 新齐谐
Transcriptions
Standard Mandarin
- Hanyu Pinyin: xīn qí xié
Yue: Cantonese
- Yale Romanization: sān chàih hàaih
- Jyutping: san1 cai4 haai4

What the Master Would Not Discuss (Zibuyu), alternatively known as Xin Qixie, is a collection of supernatural stories compiled by Qing Dynasty scholar and writer Yuan Mei. The original collection consists of over 700 stories.

The work has also been translated as What the Master Does not Speak of and other such titles, as well as Censored by Confucius in one English-language translated work of selected tales.

== Title ==
The title of the work Zi bu yu refers to the passage of the Analects of Confucius that states, "The topics the Master did not speak of were prodigies, force, disorder and gods". His reference to the master was criticised as a 'heretical' use of Confucian texts.

Yuan later changed the title to Xin Qixie (新齐谐; 新齊諧, "New Wonder Tales of Qi/from Qi") when he discovered there was a Yuan dynasty text with the title What the Master Would Not Discuss. However, Yuan's collection is still commonly known by its original title.

The original anthology appeared in 24 volumes, (Note: Volumes or juan (巻).) and a sequel anthology followed in 10 volumes under the title Xu xin Qi xie (续新齐谐; 續新齊諧, "A Sequel to New Wonder Tales of Qi"). The 34 total volumes combined boasts a content exceeding 1,000 short stories and accounts.

== Release ==
Zi Buyu first appeared in print in 1788. In contrast to the prevailing Confucian orthodoxy of the imperial court, the 747 short stories depicted a rich tapestry of daily life, including themes of ghosts, sex, betrayal, revenge, transvestism, homosexuality, and corruption. However, Yuan defended the collection, as the whims of an ageing man enjoying his last days as much as possible, though the content of his stories relates to many of his personal grievances with the Confucian establishment.

The work was so popular that the government censored it in 1836 during attempts to suppress anti-establishment sentiment.

== Stories ==
The stories were collected over a lengthy period of time. The sources included oral accounts from friends and relatives, official gazettes, or other collections.
