= Riding Alone for Thousands of Miles =

2005 Hong Kong-Chinese-Japanese film by Zhang Yimou

- Promotional poster for Riding Alone for Thousands of Miles
- Directed by: Zhang Yimou; Yasuo Furuhata (Japan section)
- Written by: Zou Jingzhi
- Produced by: Xiu Jian; Zhang Weiping; Bill Kong
- Starring: Ken Takakura; Shinobu Terajima; Li Jiamin; Jiang Wen
- Cinematography: Zhao Xiaoding; Daisaku Kimura (Japan section)
- Edited by: Cheng Long; Akimasa Kawashima (Japan section)
- Music by: Guo Wenjing
- Production companies: Columbia Pictures Film Production Asia; Gilla Co.; Beijing New Picture; Elite Group (2004) Entreprises, inc
- Distributed by: Sony Pictures Classics (United States)
- Release dates: 22 October 2005 (Tokyo International Film Festival); 22 December 2005 (China)
- Running time: 109 minutes
- Countries: Hong Kong; China; Japan
- Languages: Mandarin; Japanese

Riding Alone for Thousands of Miles (simplified Chinese: 千里走单骑; traditional Chinese: 千里走單騎; pinyin: Qiān Lǐ Zǒu Dān Qí; Japanese: 単騎, 千里を走る) is a 2005 drama film directed by Zhang Yimou and Yasuo Furuhata, and starring Ken Takakura. It premiered at the Tokyo International Film Festival on 22 October 2005 and was released in China on 22 December.

Written by Zou Jingzhi, the film tells the story of Gouichi Takata (Takakura), an aging Japanese father who, ever since his wife died, has not been in good terms with his son. When he learns that his son has been diagnosed as having possibly terminal liver cancer, he decides to travel to Yunnan province in China to film in his son's place Riding Alone for Thousands of Miles, a traditional item in the local nuo opera (傩戏), on which his son is a leading scholar. The father hopes that, by doing so, he might finally gain his son's forgiveness.

The title of the film is an allusion to the fabled story of Guan Yu's perilous solo journey to reunite with his sworn brother and lord Liu Bei, as told in the Romance of the Three Kingdoms. It is a story about brotherly love and loyalty much told in Chinese folklore and operas. The film draws a parallel between the folk tale and Takata's quest to fulfill his son's wish.

== Plot ==
Takata Gouichi (played by Ken Takakura), an elderly Japanese man, has been on poor terms with his son Kenichi (Kiichi Nakai) since the death of his wife. When his son falls ill, Gouichi travels from the province of Akita to the hospital, located in Tokyo, but his son refuses to see him. Kenichi's wife Rie (Shinobu Terajima) gives Gouichi a video-tape so that Gouichi may learn more about his son, which contains footage of Li Jiamin, an artist of Nuo opera from the Province of Yunnan of the People's Republic of China, promising to perform Riding Alone for Thousands of Miles in a year. Gouichi decides to travel to the PRC in his son's place to film Li's performance.

Gouichi arrives in the Village of Li, near the City of Lijiang, only to learn that Li was imprisoned after assaulting someone for mocking his illegitimate son. His translator Jiang Wen and the local guide Qiu Lin suggest that he film someone else, but Gouichi insists on Li. After an uncertain and time-consuming process of obtaining clearances from authorities, Gouichi gains entry to the prison facility, but Li breaks down in tears because he misses his son too badly. Gouichi decides to travel to Stone Village to retrieve Li's 8-year-old son Yang Yang (Yang Zhenbo), whose mother is revealed to have died shortly before Gouichi's visit to the prison. While in the village, Gouichi receives a call from Rie, telling him that Kenichi has been touched by his efforts, and requests that he come home. Gouichi wonders whether the message really was from Kenichi, but opts to continue his mission.

On the way to the prison, the vehicle breaks down, and Yang Yang chooses to run away, being filled with anxiety at meeting a father whom he does not remember. Gouichi chases after the boy, and the two become lost in the limestone hills, having no choice but to sleep in a cave. Yang Yang is hostile toward Gouichi at first, but comes to trust him as the hours pass by. They are found the next morning by the combined efforts of villagers and the police. Gouichi feels that Yang Yang's opinion should be respected, and lets him go home. Shortly after, he receives another call from Rie, informing him that Kenichi has died, leaving behind a letter saying that he has forgiven his father.

Gouichi returns to the prison with photographs of Yang Yang. Li is moved and promises to give his best performance. As he, with the fellow prisoners who are the musicians and supporting actors, are about to begin, he asks Gouichi why he is not recording. Gouichi explains that, because his son has died, recording is no longer necessary. Li, however, persuades him to record anyway, given the difficulty in coming all this way; and so the performance begins in view of a camera held by Gouichi. Gouichi, the prison warden and the audience of prisoners are moved to tears by the performance.

The film revolves around the meaning of Gouichi's journey, and brings in issues of performance and duplicity, the authenticity or its lack in tourist experience, and the way in which success abroad can seem to erase failure at home.

== Cast ==
- Ken Takakura as Gouichi Takata (Japanese and T. Chinese: 高田剛一, S. Chinese: 高田刚一, Hepburn: Takata Gōichi, Pinyin: Gāotián Gāngyī), an aged Japanese father who travels to China in a quest to seek forgiveness from his son Kenichi.
- Shinobu Terajima as Rie Takata (高田理恵 Takata Rie, Gāotián Lǐhuì), Kenichi's wife.
- Kiichi Nakai as Kenichi Takata (高田健一 Takata Ken'ichi, Gāotián Jiànyī), Gouichi's son. Kiichi Nakai lends his voice to this role, who never makes an appearance in the film.
- Li Jiamin as Li Jiamin (李加民, Pinyin: Lǐ Jiāmín, Hepburn: Rī Jāmin): Li acts as himself, a local Nuo Opera artiste from Yunnan province of China.
- Jiang Wen as Jiang Wen (蒋 雯, Jiǎng Wén, Jan Wen) (also known as Jasmine in the English script): Jiang acts as a translator named after herself (she is a tour guide in real life).
- Qiu Lin as Qiu Lin (邱 林, Qiū Lín, Chū Rin) (also known as Lingo in the English script): Qiu acts as a local guide named after himself (he is a real-life tour guide from the Naxi village region).
- Yang Zhenbo as Yang Yang (S. Chinese: 杨杨, T. Chinese and Japanese: 楊楊, Yángyáng, Yanyan), the eight-year-old illegitimate son of Li.
- The drama is performed by the Guizhou Anshun City Zhanjiatun Sanguo Drama Team.

== Reception ==
=== Critical response ===
Riding Alone for Thousands of Miles has an approval rating of 80% on review aggregator website Rotten Tomatoes, based on 75 reviews, and an average rating of 7.1/10. The website's critical consensus states: "Doesn't reach the heights of Zhang Yimou's best, but this is still a heartwarming tale of love and forgiveness from the acclaimed Chinese director". Metacritic assigned the film a weighted average score of 73 out of 100, based on 21 critics, indicating "generally favorable reviews".

=== Awards and nominations ===
- San Diego Film Critics Society Awards, 2006
  - Best Foreign Language Film
  - Best Actor — Ken Takakura
- Hong Kong Film Awards, 2007
  - Best Asian Film

== DVD release ==
Riding Alone for Thousands of Miles was released on DVD on 6 February 2007 and distributed in the United States by Sony Pictures Classics. The DVD features the original Chinese / Japanese audio track, as well as dubbings in French and Portuguese, with English, Spanish, French and Portuguese subtitles. The DVD also contains The Making of Riding Alone for Thousands of Miles as a special feature.
