= Nuo theatre =

Type of Chinese opera

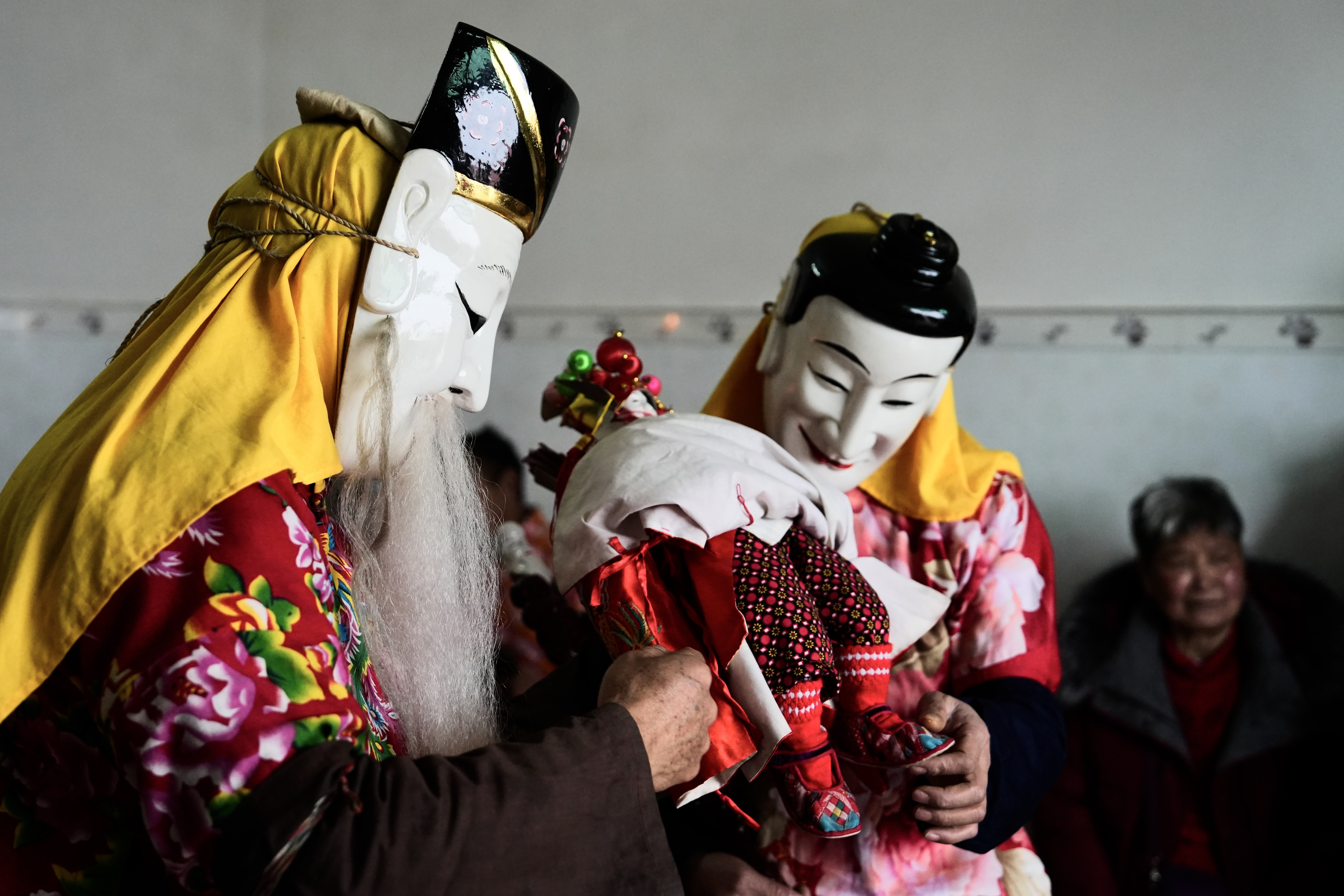
During the Spring Festival, masked performers visit every household in villages near Nanfeng, Jiangxi to perform the Nuo dance.

People performing Nuo theatre

Nuo theatre, Nuo drama, Nuo opera, or Nuoxi (traditional Chinese: 儺戲; simplified Chinese: 傩戏; pinyin: nuóxì) is a traditional theatrical art popular in many regions of China. It is characterized by features such as ferocious masks, distinctive attire and adornments, a distinctive performance language, and mysterious scenes. The purpose of Nuo theatre is to drive away devils, disease and evil influences, and also to petition for blessings from the gods. Singing and dancing are included in Nuo theatre, and performers wear costumes and masks.

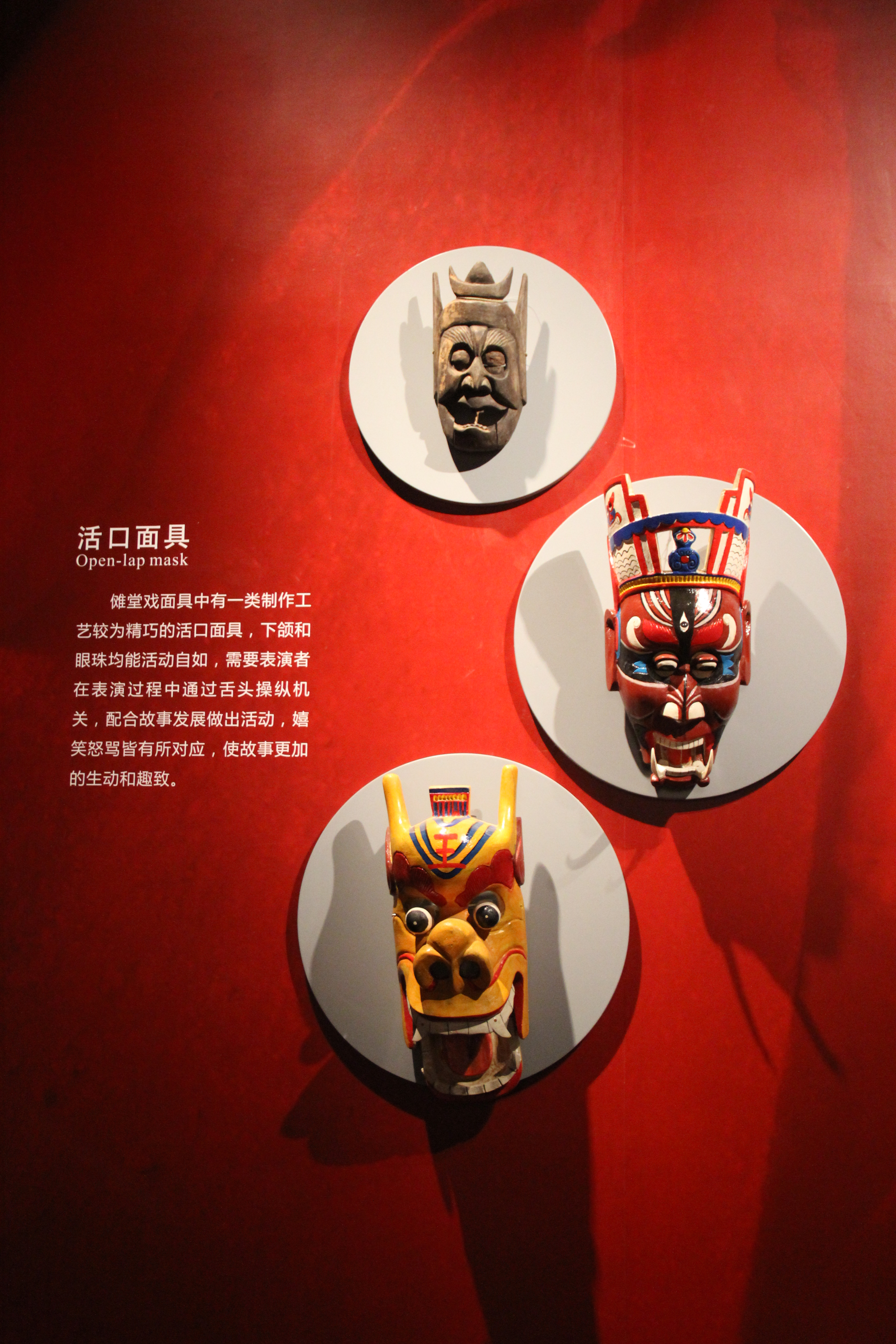
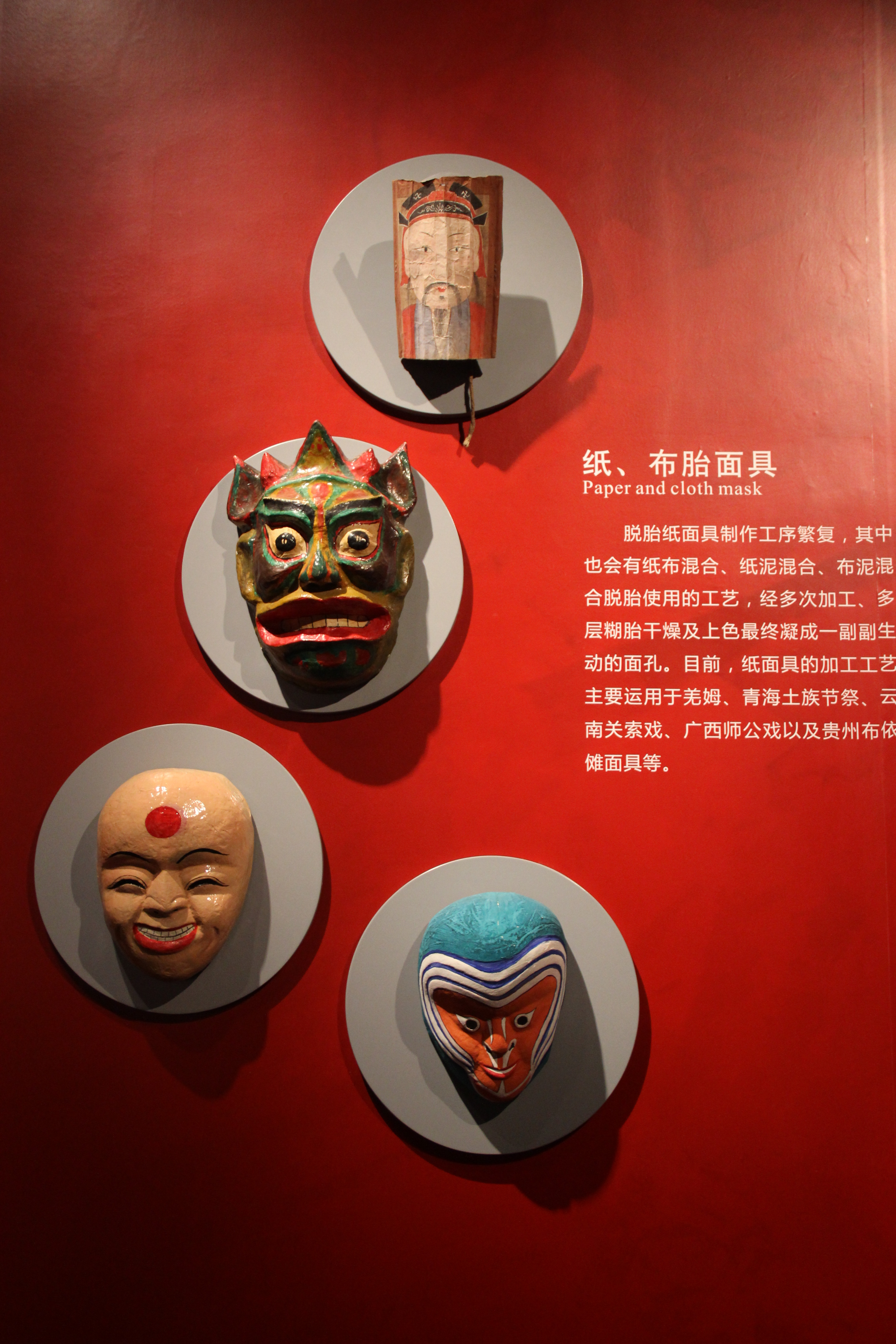
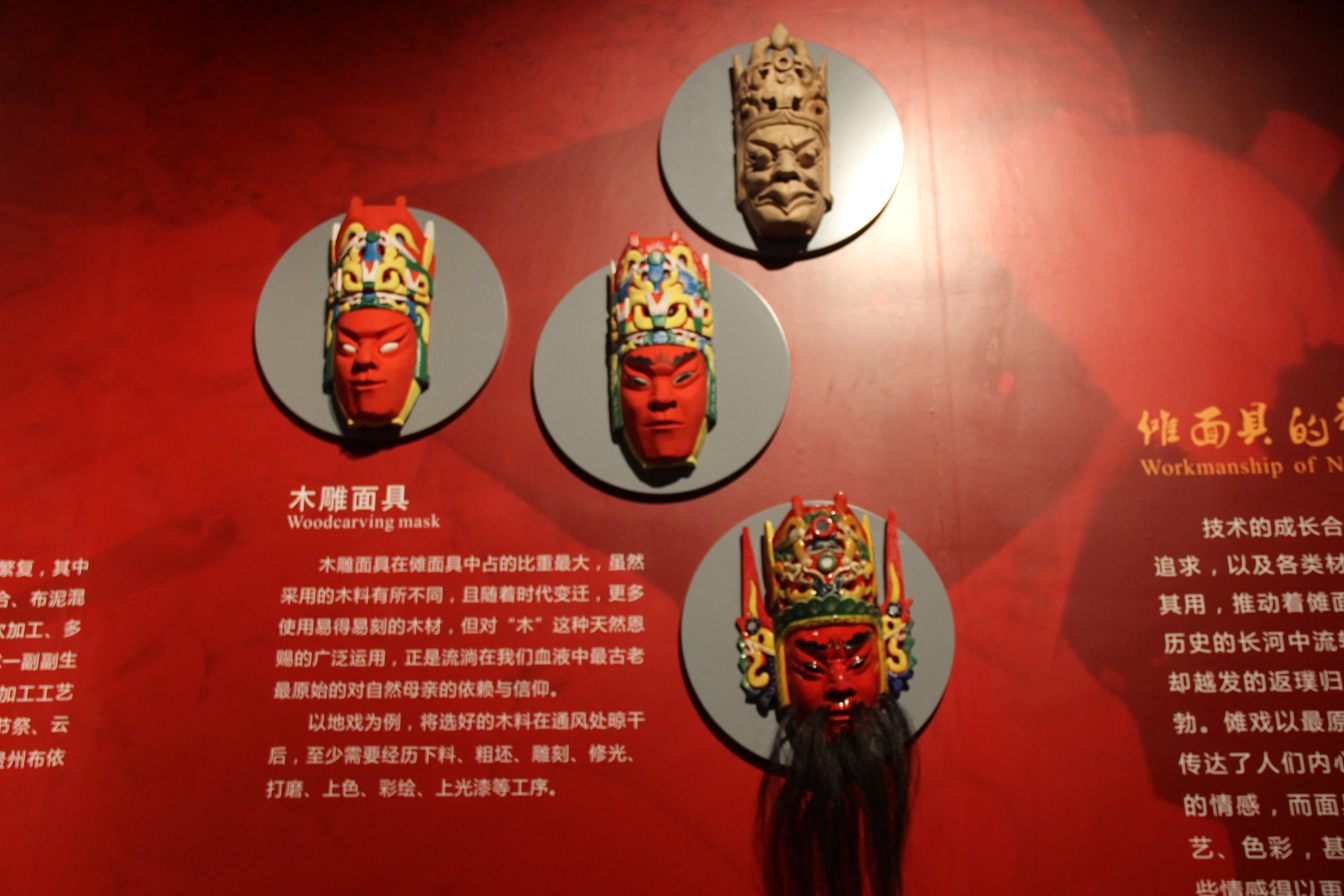
Examples of Nuo Opera masks made in different styles and materials

Nuo theatre is a direct and important expressive medium of Nuo culture. Other forms of representation of Nuo culture include Nuo dance (傩舞; 儺舞), Nuo song (傩歌; 儺歌), Nuo sacrifice (傩祭) and Nuo ceremony (傩仪; 儺儀) and others. The unique symbol of Nuo theatre, the masks, are considered a treasure of Chinese folk art.

Nuo theatre has a considerable repertoire, which varies from region to region. Nuo dramas are usually based on well-known Chinese historical events or folk stories such as Romance of the Three Kingdoms, Journey to the West, Water Margin and the story of the Dragon Kings. Some famous repertoires of Nuo theatre include Lady Mengjiang, Seizing the Yellow Devil, and Story of Mount Liang. Nuo theatre is popular in rural areas, including Guizhou, Anhui, Jiangxi, Hubei, Hunan, and Guangxi. It is also popular in the regions inhabited by other minorities, such as the Hmong, the Dong, and Yao.

== Etymology ==
Nuo means an oath, binding utterance, or exorcism in Chinese religious culture. The Chinese character for "nuo" is "傩" in simplified Chinese or "儺" in traditional Chinese. This is a very uncommon character in modern Chinese. The meaning of the character "Nuo" is a patterned step to drive away the devil during the last month of the Chinese lunar new year. The Chinese character for "theatre" or "drama" is "戏" in simplified Chinese or "戲" in traditional Chinese.

== History ==
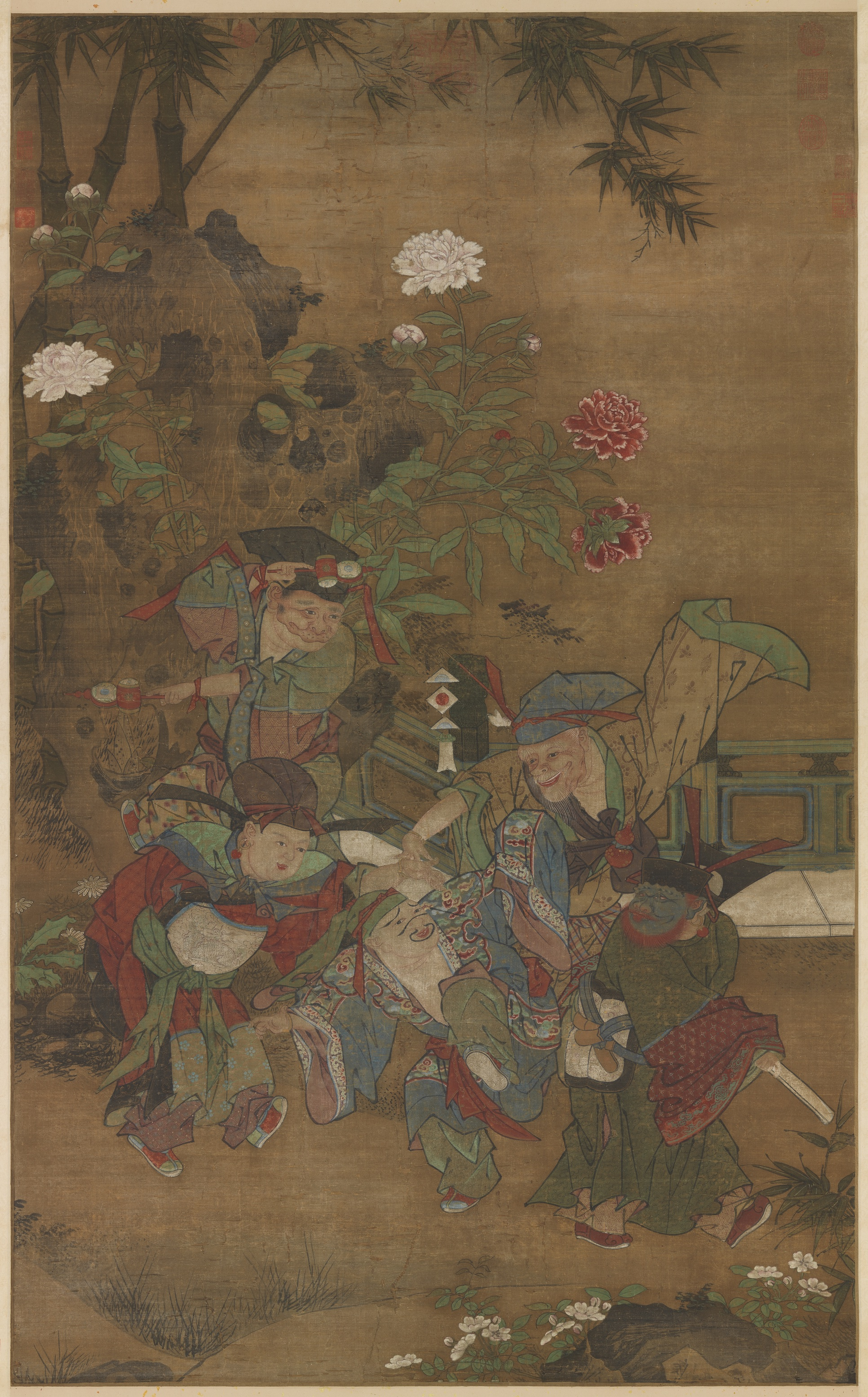
Su Hanchen's painting of Nuo performers

Nuo theatre is a kind of folk dramatic art that originated from folk religion. In the Analects of Confucius, "villager Nuo" (or village Nuo) was mentioned. The Lüshi Chunqiu mentions that there was also a custom that whenever there was a celebration, grand Nuo (or royal Nuo) would be a necessity.

=== Origin ===
The primitive form, dating back to antiquity, of Nuo theatre is Nuoji (傩祭; 儺祭), which is a special sacrificial ceremony. "Ji" means sacrifice or sacrificial activities and events. While performing religious rites, people pray to ward off disasters and receive good luck. So, Nuoji was formed as a sacrificial activity or ceremony to worship gods and ancestors. The exact date when Nuoji was formed is unknown, but the Nuo ceremony was first recorded on oracle bones during the Shang dynasty (17th-11th century BC), and flourished in the Zhou dynasty (11th century-256BC).

In the Zhou dynasty, Nuoji was already very popular within the central parts of its territory. Nuoji was performed during festivals and holidays at that time with the purpose of driving away devils and plague. Nuoji was a very important social, political, and religious event and a specific government department was established to be in charge of Nuoji. At the time, besides the grand Nuo ceremony held by the royal court, the folk Nuo ceremony also appeared in the countryside.

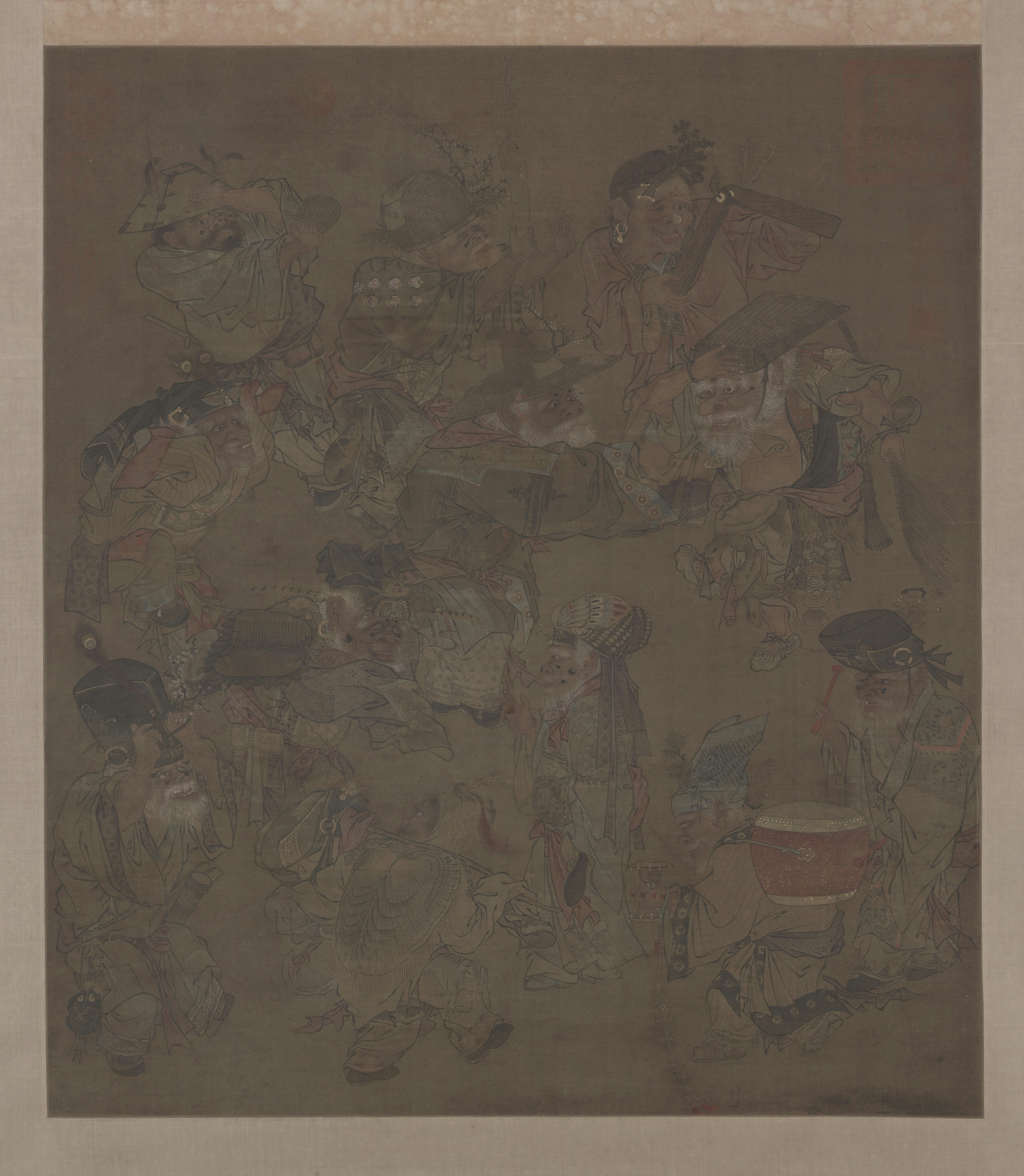
Song dynasty painting of Nuo-dancers.

=== Development ===
During and after the Tang dynasty (618–907), Nuoji gradually developed into a dance drama and became more of a recreation than a ritual. It became a masked drama enacted by a priest performing an exorcism, and has been described as "theater with a presentational aspect, a festival, and the idea of gatherings to establish ties and norms." The rituals have been incorporated into people's lives and are seen as commentaries on Chinese life.

Around the Song dynasty (960–1279), people started to perform with masks during Nuoji; thus Nuo theatre was basically formed. During the Qing dynasty (1644–1911), Nuo theatre, which had separated from Nuoji, had become a unique performing art. During the 1930s and 1940s, Nuo theatre began to be performed in busy cities and towns.

Today, the popularity of Nuo theatre has declined and it can normally only be seen during the Spring Festival and other important traditional Chinese holidays, in remote mountainous areas, such as Guizhou, Hunan, Jiangxi, Yunnan, Sichuan, and Anhui provinces.

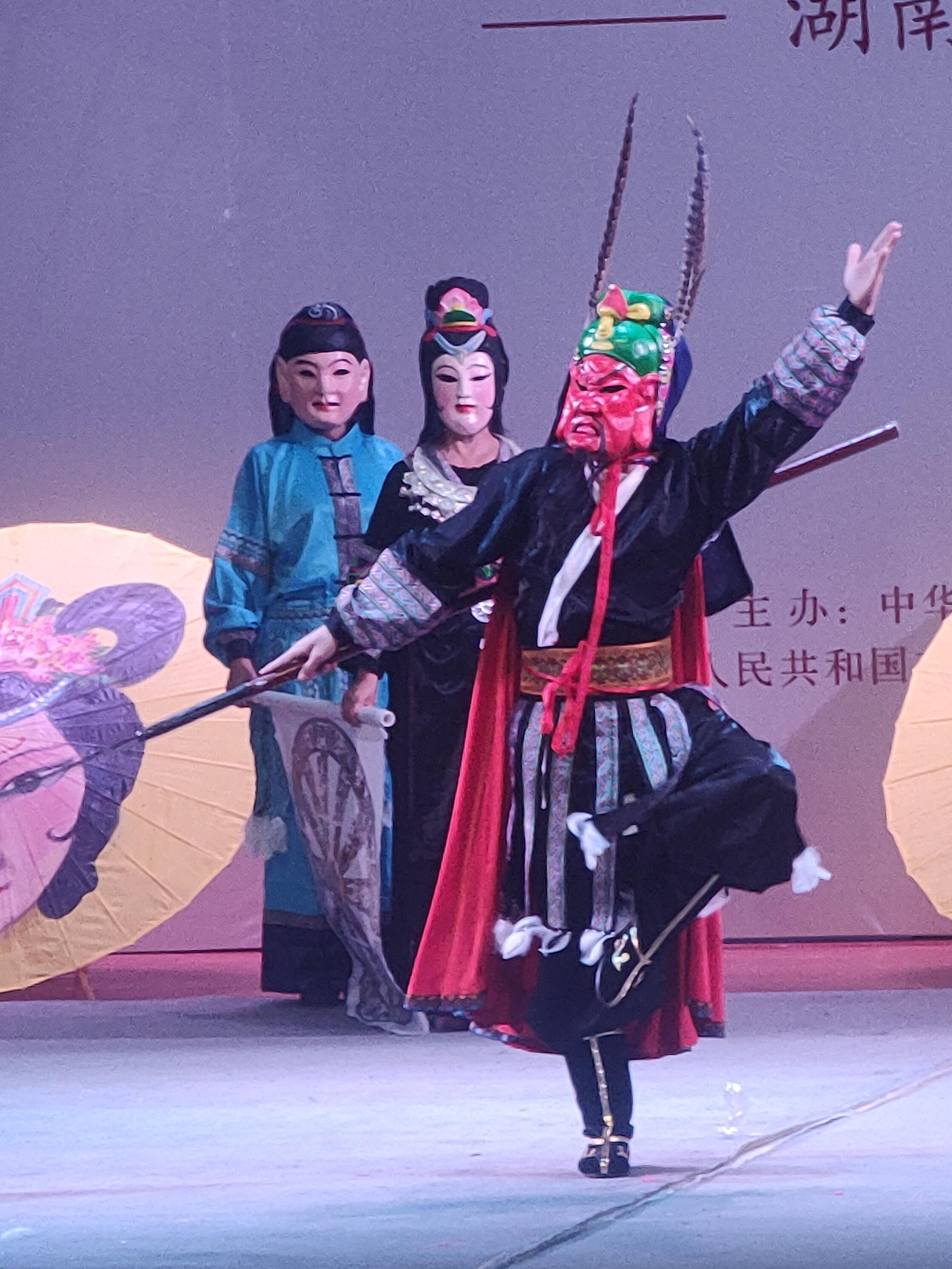
2020 performance of Guan Yu crosses five passes and slays six generals

=== After the establishment of the People's Republic of China ===
Nuoism has been promoted by the Chinese government as a matrix of ethnic identity, such as those of the Tujia people.

== Varieties ==
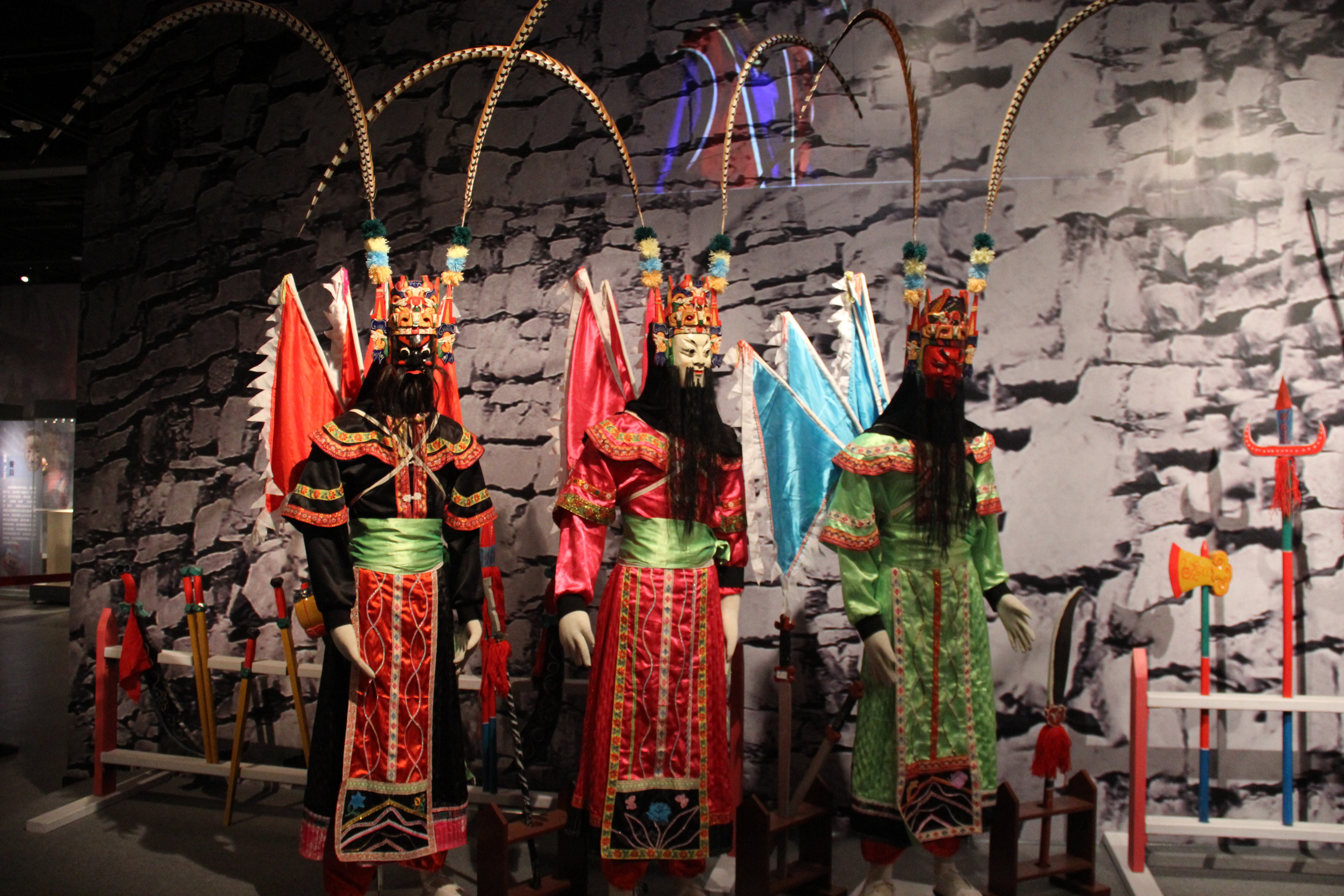
Nuo Opera costumes housed in Jinsha Site Museum, Sichuan.

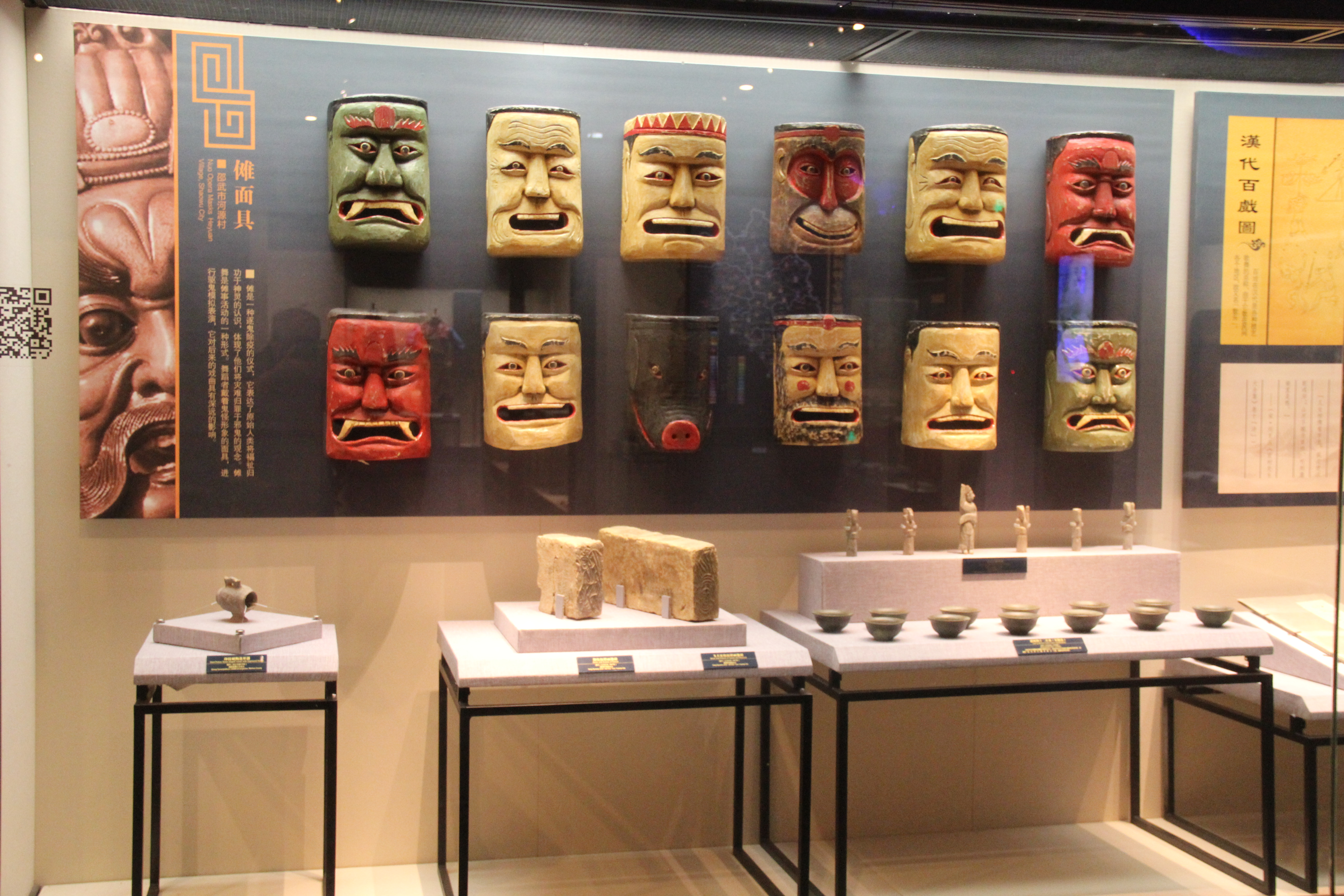
Fujian Opera masks.

Nuo theatre varies greatly from place to place because local culture and customs have a great influence on the form, masks, costumes and conventions of Nuo theatre. Generally, Nuo theatre can be categorized as follows: Guizhou, Jiangxi, Anhui, and Yunnan.

=== Guizhou Nuo ===
Guizhou is the center of Nuo theatre in southwestern China due to its long Nuo theatre history and abundant repertoire. In Anshun, a city in Guizhou, Nuo theatre is the primary entertainment activity. Musical instruments include one gong and one drum. The drummer has a very important role during a performance. A patch of land serves as a stage. As a result, Guizhou Nuo is also called Dixi (ground opera).

The only two occasions for the performance of Nuo theatre are at the Spring Festival (Chinese New Year) and at the middle of the 7th lunar month, the time of the rice harvest. People hope Nuo theatre can drive away bad luck and bring a good harvest. Year after year, numerous locals are attracted to this performance. Sometimes a drama can last a dozen days. As is true in most other areas, Nuo Drama in Tunbu is the performed by the men. The moment a dancer puts on his mask, he will not speak or act casually since putting on a mask means the spirit is on him already.

=== Jiangxi Nuo ===
Jiangxi (江西) Nuo is usually called Gan Nuo as Gan (赣 贛) is the abbreviation of Jiangxi Province. Nuo theatre is most popular in the counties of Nanfeng and Shangli in Jiangxi. From late Qing Dynasty to now, there were about 150 Nuo theatre performing groups. A temple for the Nuo god, which was built in the Ming Dynasty and still functions well today for people to worship the Nuo god. About 80 Nuo theatre programs from the past still exist today. The number of Nuo masks in Jiangxi is over 2000, and there are approximately 2000 professional Nuo theatre performing folk artists. In Shangli county, a popular saying says that, in ancient times, there was a Nuo god every five kilometers. Therefore, Shangli county preserves over 20 Nuo god temples.

Nuo dancing, one of the most ancient arts and a necessary element in Nuo theatre, has existed in Nanfeng, Jiangxi for over 2000 years. The movements of Nanfeng Nuo dancing are simple but powerful, retaining their ancient characters. Nanfeng Nuo dancing was even regarded as "The Active fossil of Chinese dancing Art". In 1996, Nanfeng county was called "The village of Chinese folk Art-Nuo Art" by National Culture Department of China.

=== Anhui Nuo ===
Anhui (安徽) Nuo is special because it is performed on a clan basis and not by a troupe as in other places. Chizhou Nuo is the best known Nuo theatre in Anhui. The origins of Nuo culture in Chizhou areas is one of the most ancient and can be traced back over thousands of years to the Neolithic period. It has been recently included in the Nation's First Catalogue of Intangible Cultural Heritage. Chizhou Nuo theatre is divided into three performing formats: Nuo Ritual. Nuo Dancing and Nuo Drama. The complete stage performance must be mixed with dramatic plot, role-playing, type of role, and qiemo (settings, scene and props). The performing skill can only be learned through oral instruction and the personal teachings passed on to disciples in person from generation to generation. Therefore, the performing art of Nuo theatre is normally passed on within a clan from generation to generation. There may be two sacrificial ceremonies (in which Nuo theatre is performed as a must) a year: the "spring sacrificial ceremony" that is held sometime between the seventh day to the fifteenth day of the first lunar month and the "autumn sacrificial ceremony" that is held on the fifteenth day of the eighth lunar month. Apart from these two ceremonies, there is no performance at all throughout the year.

The dance, which has a strong local flavor, continues in many villages in Guichi County of Chizhou today. Surrounded in the mist of incense and smoke, Nuo dancers, colorfully dressed, walk on stilts and wear masks while performing, expressing their wishes of sacrifice to their ancestors, praying for blessing and dispelling evil. While performing in mountainous villages, dancers have to put masks on their foreheads, letting the audiences who are standing on the surrounding slopes to see them clearly. To accompany the dancing, the music instruments range from drum, bell, earthen bowl, bamboo flute and Suona. There is a popular saying among Chizhou area that a village would not be considered a village without Nuo theatre.

When Chizhou Nuo theatre is performed, it normally has three integrated components: Nuo dancing, main performance, and salutatory &and complimentary remarks. Some of the well-known repertoire of Chizhou Nuo are "Liu Wenlong", "Meng Jiangnü", "Fan Silking" and "Zhang Wenxian" etc.

=== Yunnan Nuo ===
Leopard Nuo theatre in Chuxiong City, Yunnan, differentiates itself by the fact that all dancers are painted with a leopard pattern on their nude bodies. The ferocious and agile leopard is regarded as the most qualified to drive away devils. Leopards are played by twelve Yi boys about 10 years old. On the morning of the performance, young dancers will have the leopard pattern painted on their backs, hands, feet, and belly in black, white, red, and yellow colors. A yue-kin, a four-stringed plucked instrument with a full-moon-shaped sound box, is painted on their chests. Their faces are covered with palm leaves, and their heads are decorated with two pheasant tails. When the make-up is finished, dancers enter the role of leopards, prohibiting further talking.

Village rooftops connected by ladders or wood panels form the stage for the "leopards." At the climax of the dance, leopards run after young girls watching the show until the girls take them home, where snacks have been prepared. Leopards eat some snacks as well as throwing some away, while continuing to dance. This devil-dispelling activity is performed in the rooms, kitchens and stalls of one family after another; the leopards dispel devils for all the villagers.

In the film Riding Alone for Thousands of Miles directed by Zhang Yimou, Yunnan Nuo is prominently depicted and featured.

== Masks ==
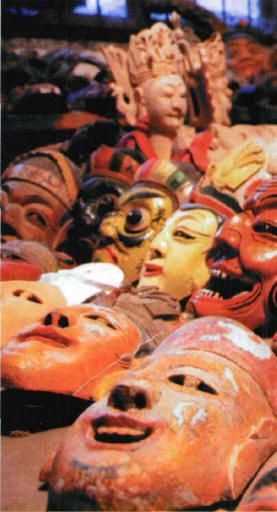
Nuo masks

The most distinctive feature of Nuo theatre is that the performers wear Nuo masks (traditional Chinese: 儺面; simplified Chinese: 傩面; pinyin: nuómìan). Different roles require different masks to reveal the characters, through their changing facial features and decorations. The masks are highly aesthetic. The art, selected materials, colors and applications of Nuo masks vary among the regions, ethnic groups, culture and aesthetic interests. That distinctiveness adds the masks' beauty. The masks are mainly made of poplar and willow since poplar is light and less prone to cracks, while willow is widely regarded as having the power to ward off evil. Nuo theatre involves many acrobatic performances, such as getting into a hot pot, holding burned stones, crossing a fiery pit, swallowing and blowing fire, and stepping on a mountain of swords. As most of the performers are specially trained, they are good at giving exciting performances.

The number of masks used in one drama ranges from several dozen to two hundred. There are five kinds of masks used in Nuo Drama, namely: civilian general, military general, old general, young general and woman general with other minor roles such as soldiers and Taoist monks. Each nuo mask has a fixed name, represents a certain role and has legendary stories to tell of its origins. In Guizhou, a province with the largest nuo drama repertoire, at least 24 masks are required to perform an entire nuo drama piece. The masks can appear valiant and martial, stern and tough, or gentle and kind, and they come in various styles to represent different figures. For instance, since the responsibility of valiant gods is to emit awe and dispel ghosts and devils, their masks usually have horns and buckteeth, with a very ferocious countenance.

The masks are endowed with mysterious religious and cultural meanings, both in Nuoji and Nuo theatre performances. People in Nuo culture circles, who regard the masks as symbols and carriers of gods, observe various rules and conventions. For instance, the ceremony of enshrining a Buddha statue is held before making the masks; before using them, the ceremony of opening the case; and storing them, the ceremony of sealing the case. According to the rules, women are not allowed to touch or wear the masks, and only men can produce, use and store masks. Once a man wears a mask, he is supposed to be possessed by a god or spirit. And therefore, he must not speak.

Studies also show that the face painting of Beijing opera and face changing of Sichuan opera were influenced by Nuo masks.

Nuo opera masks

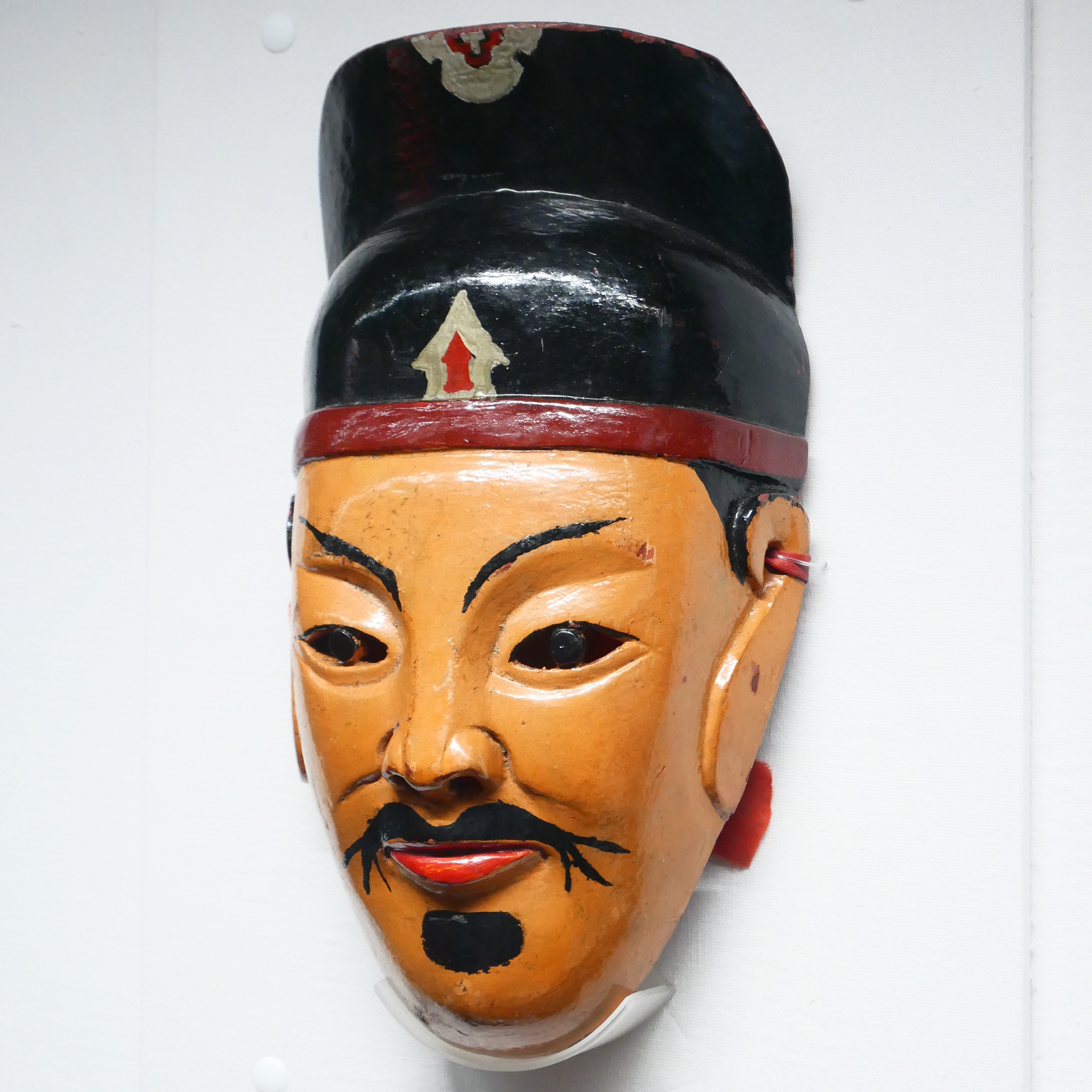

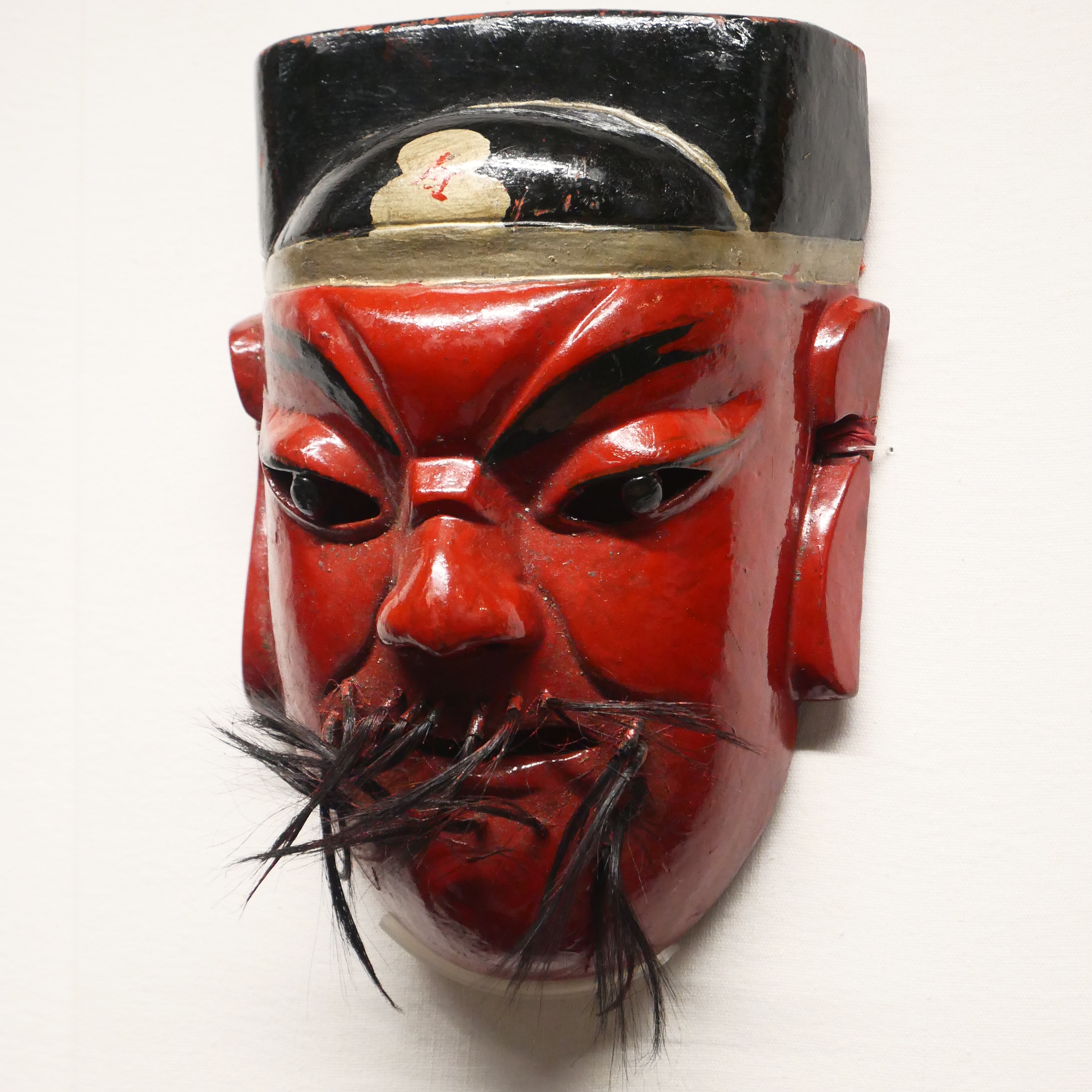

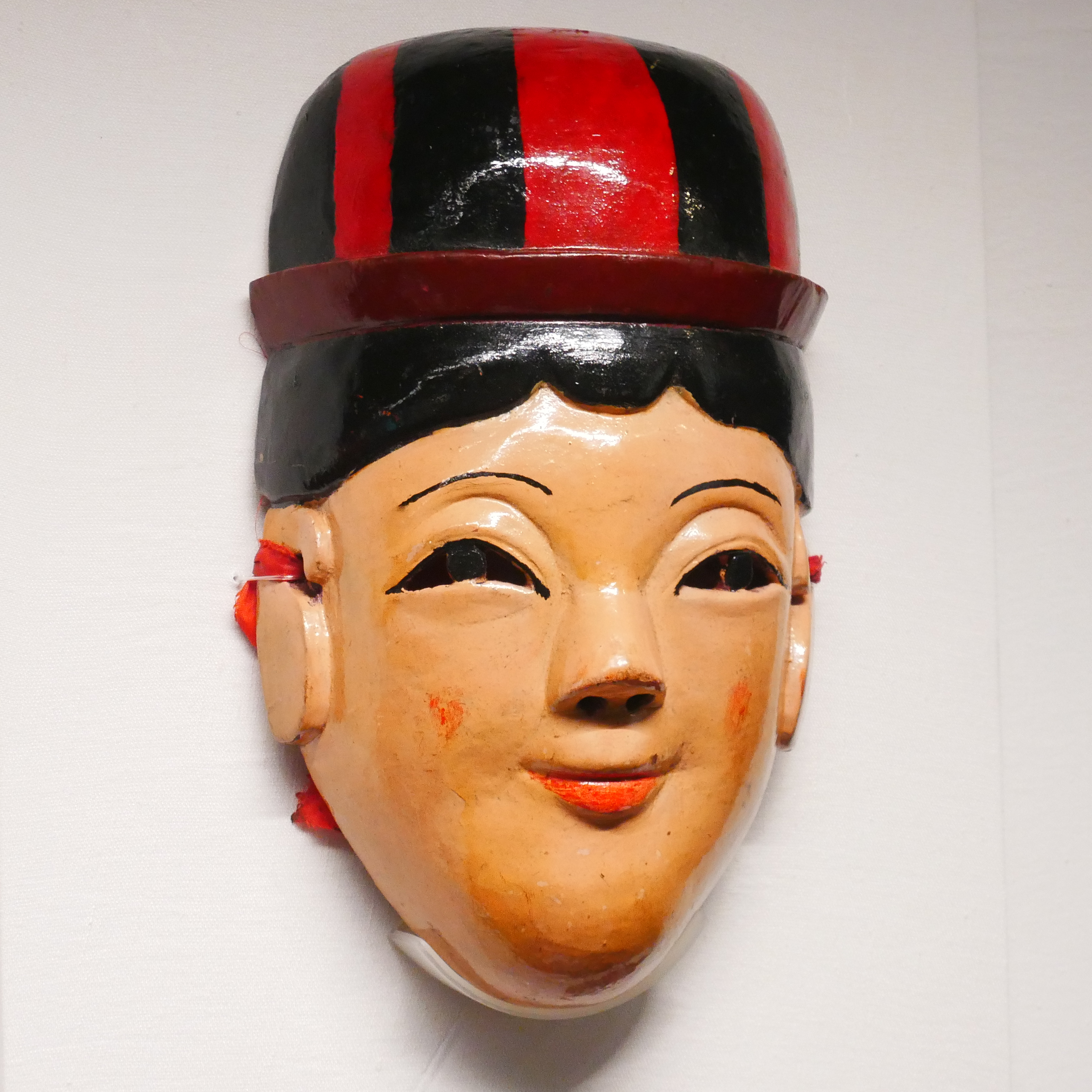

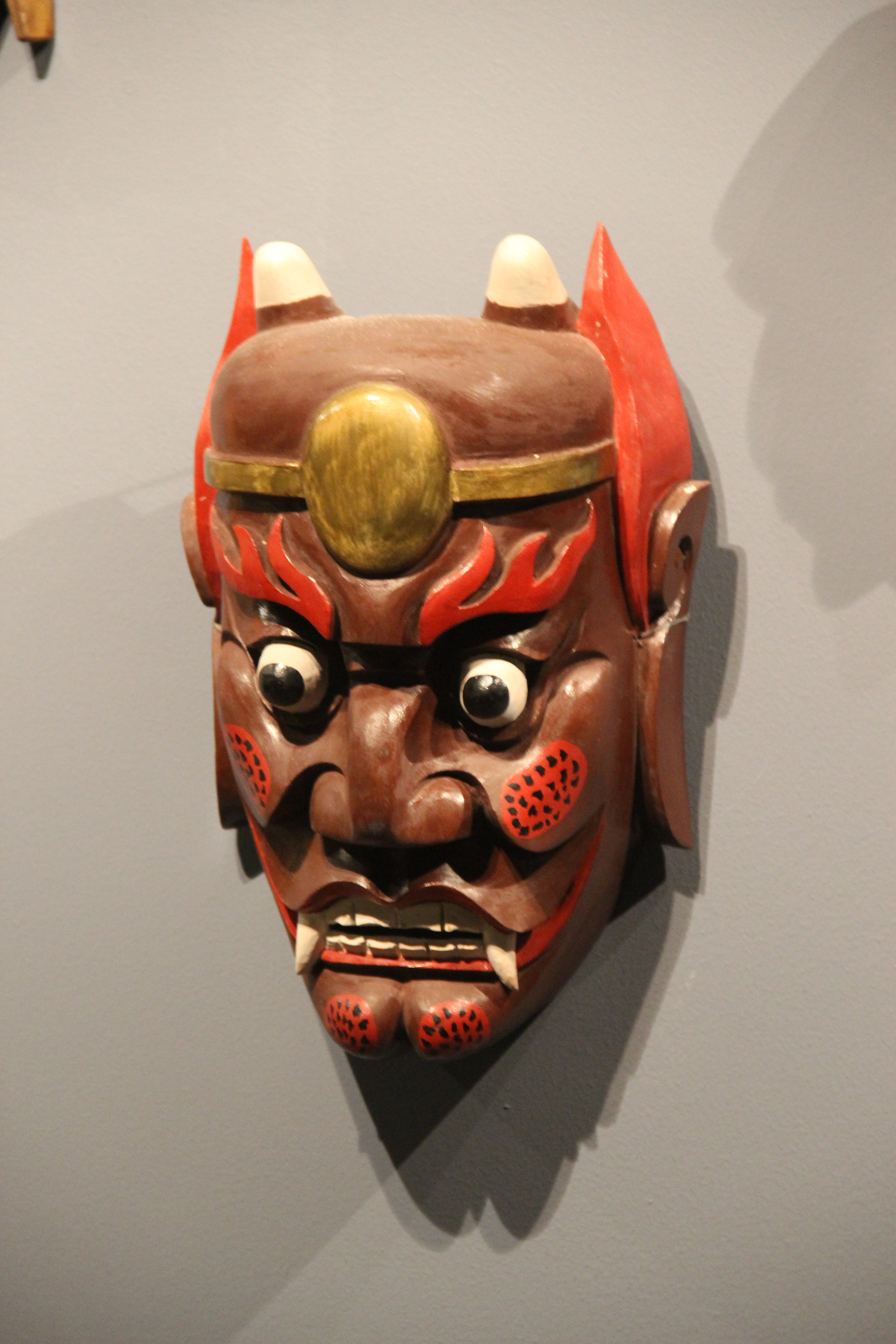

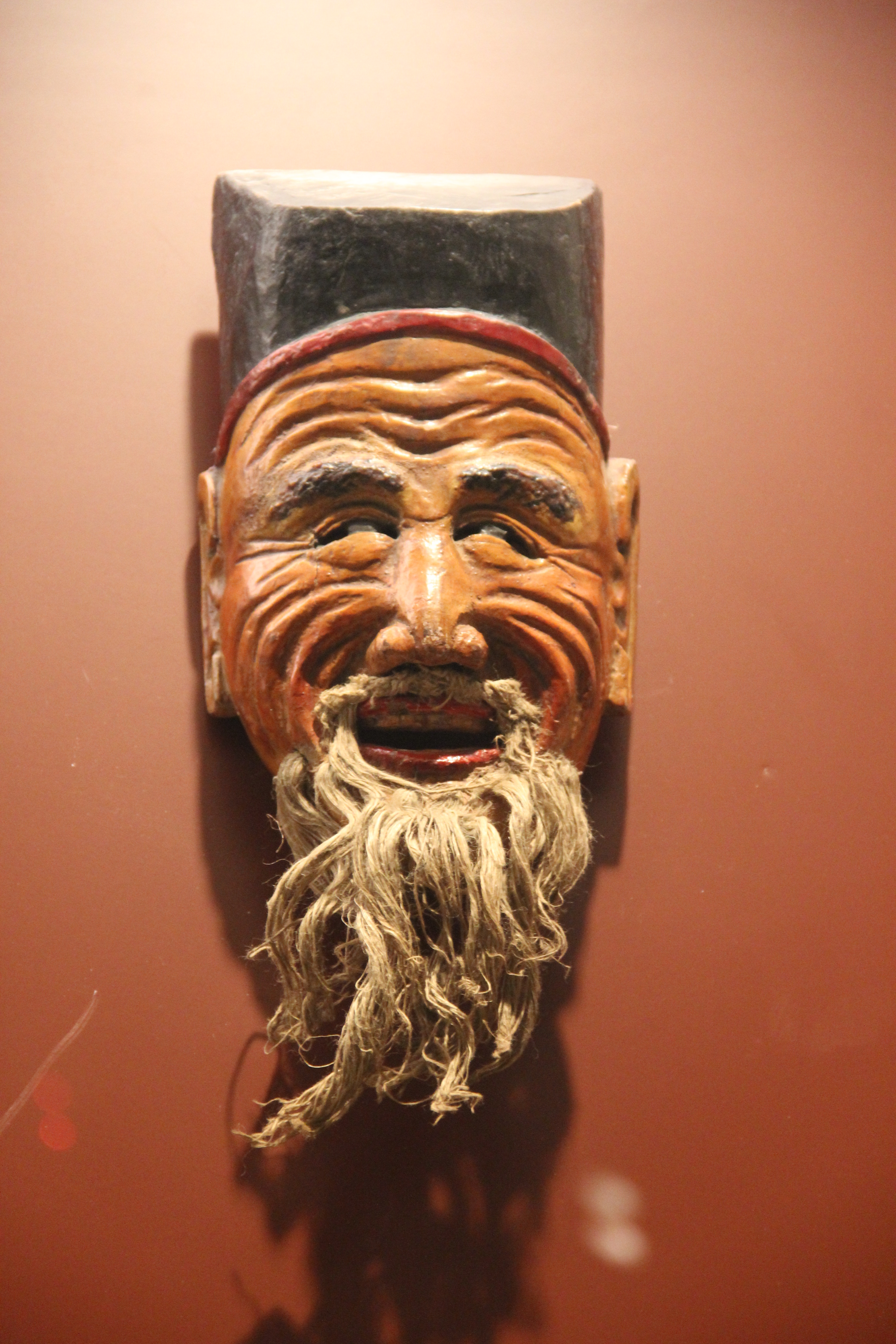

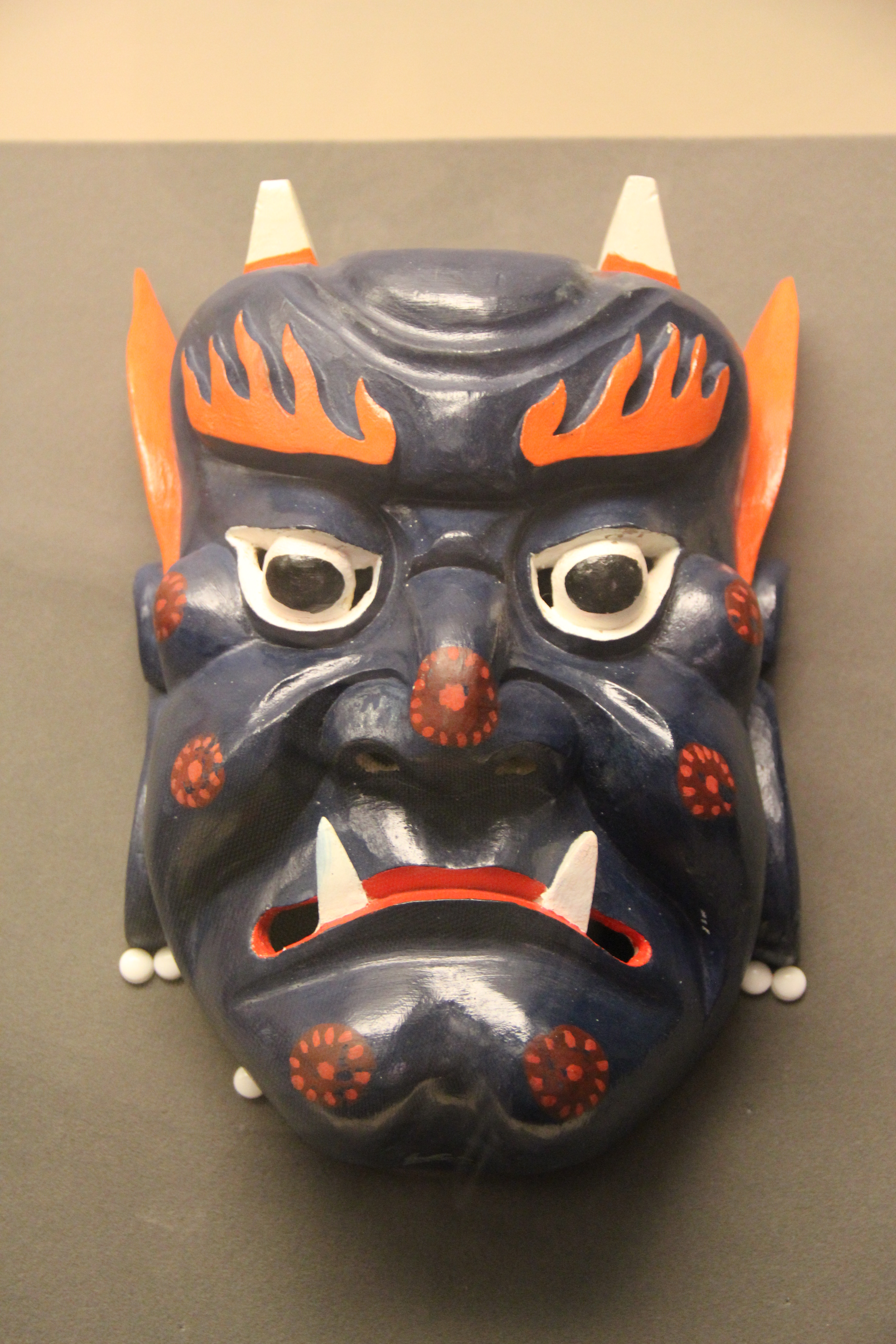

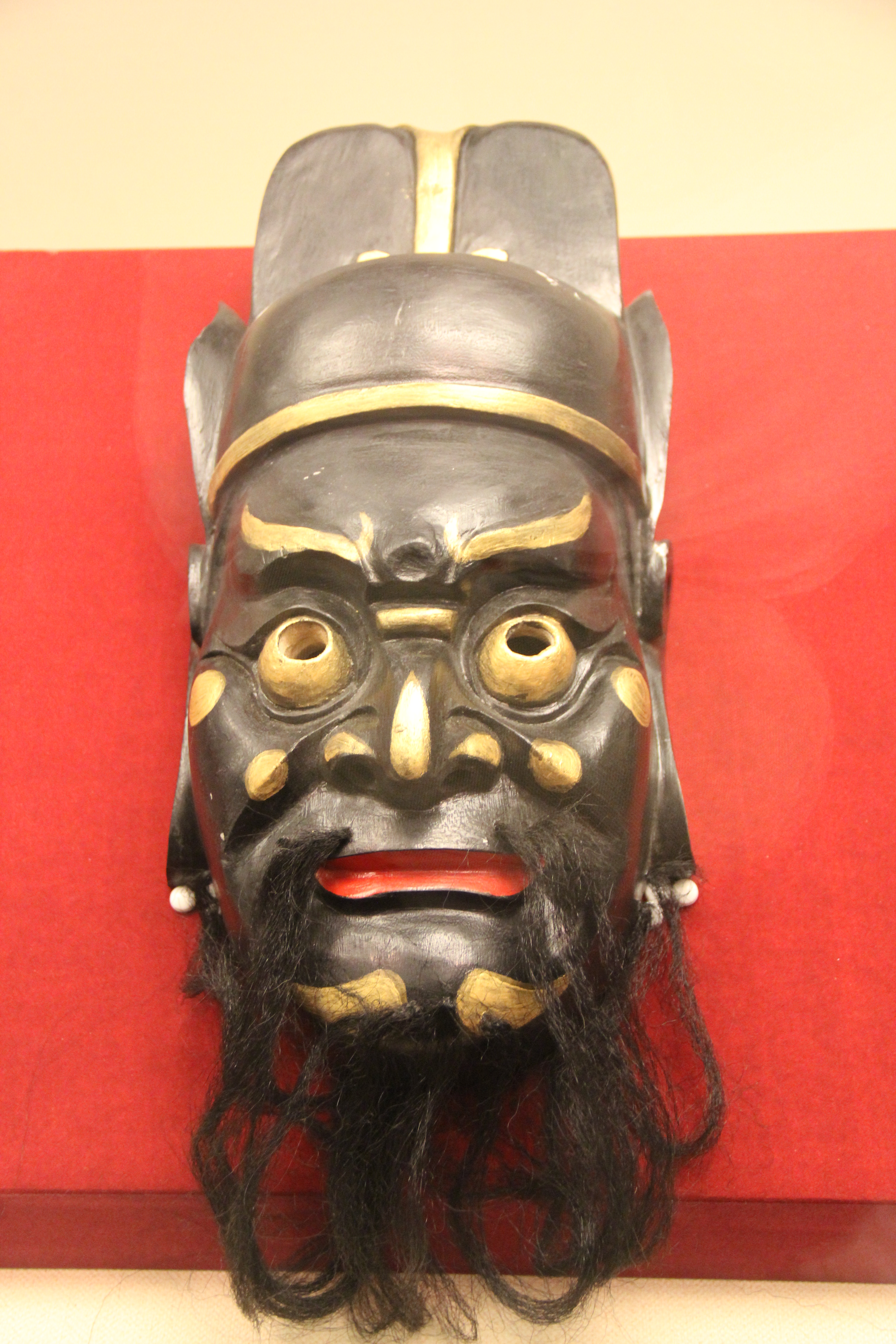

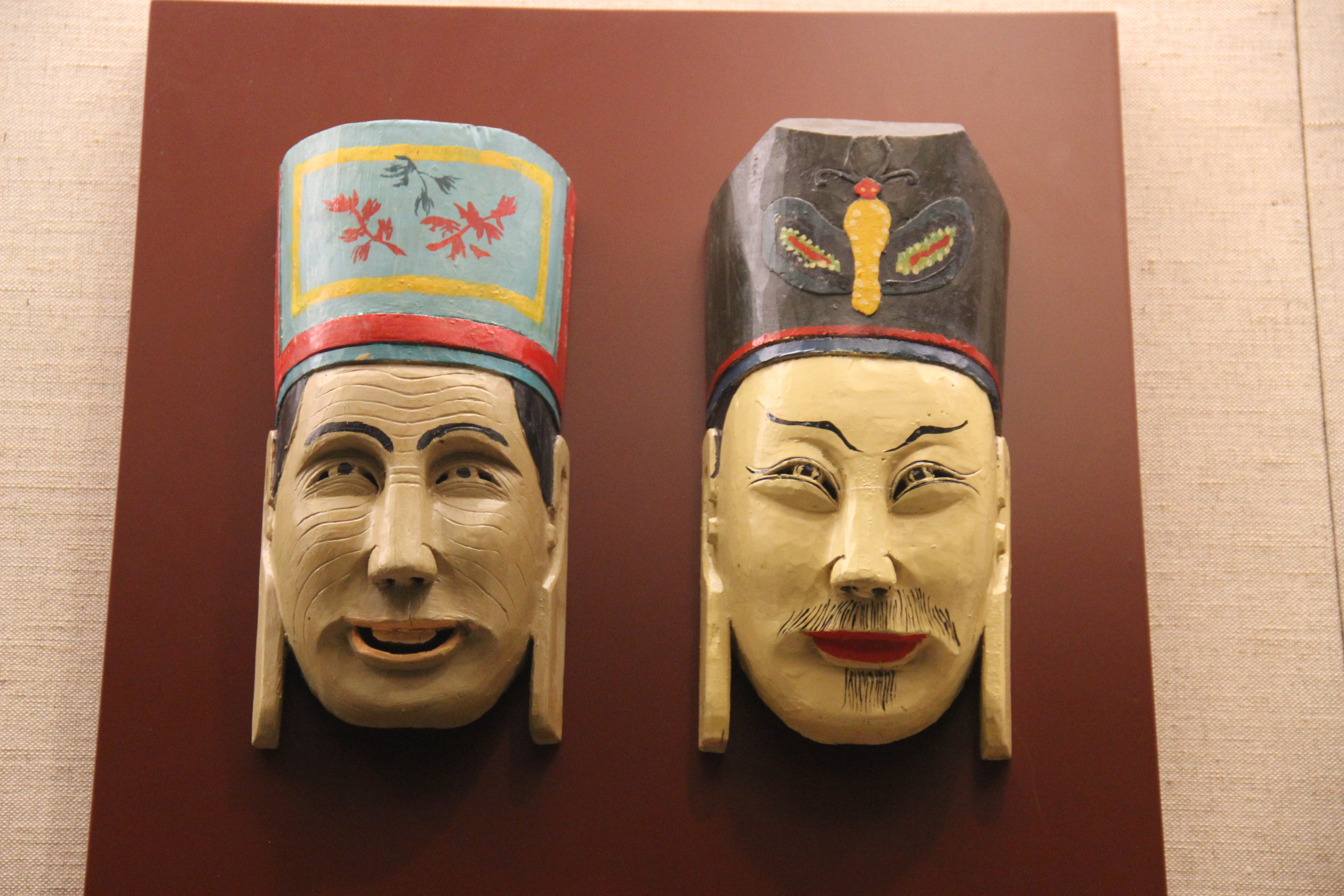

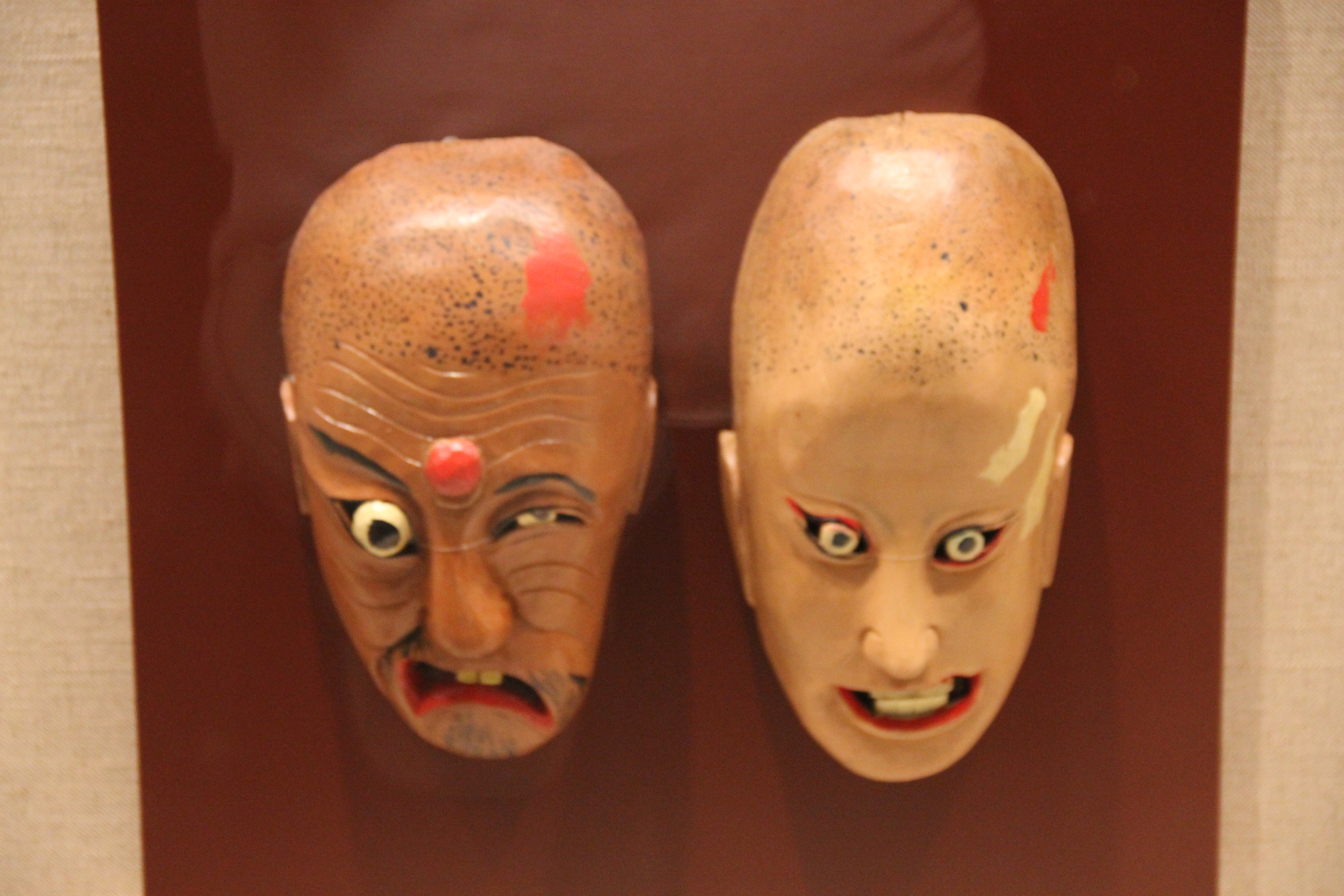

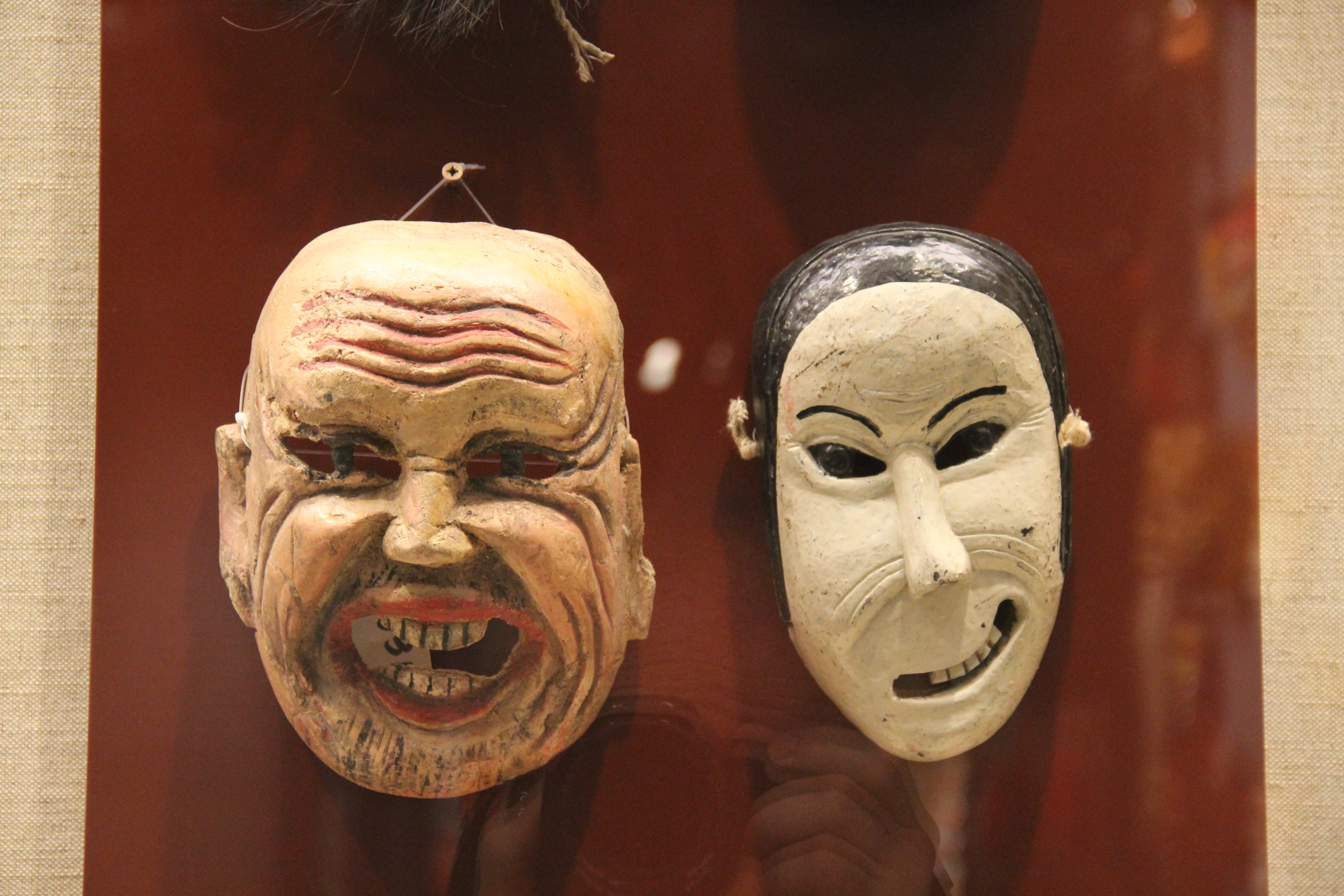

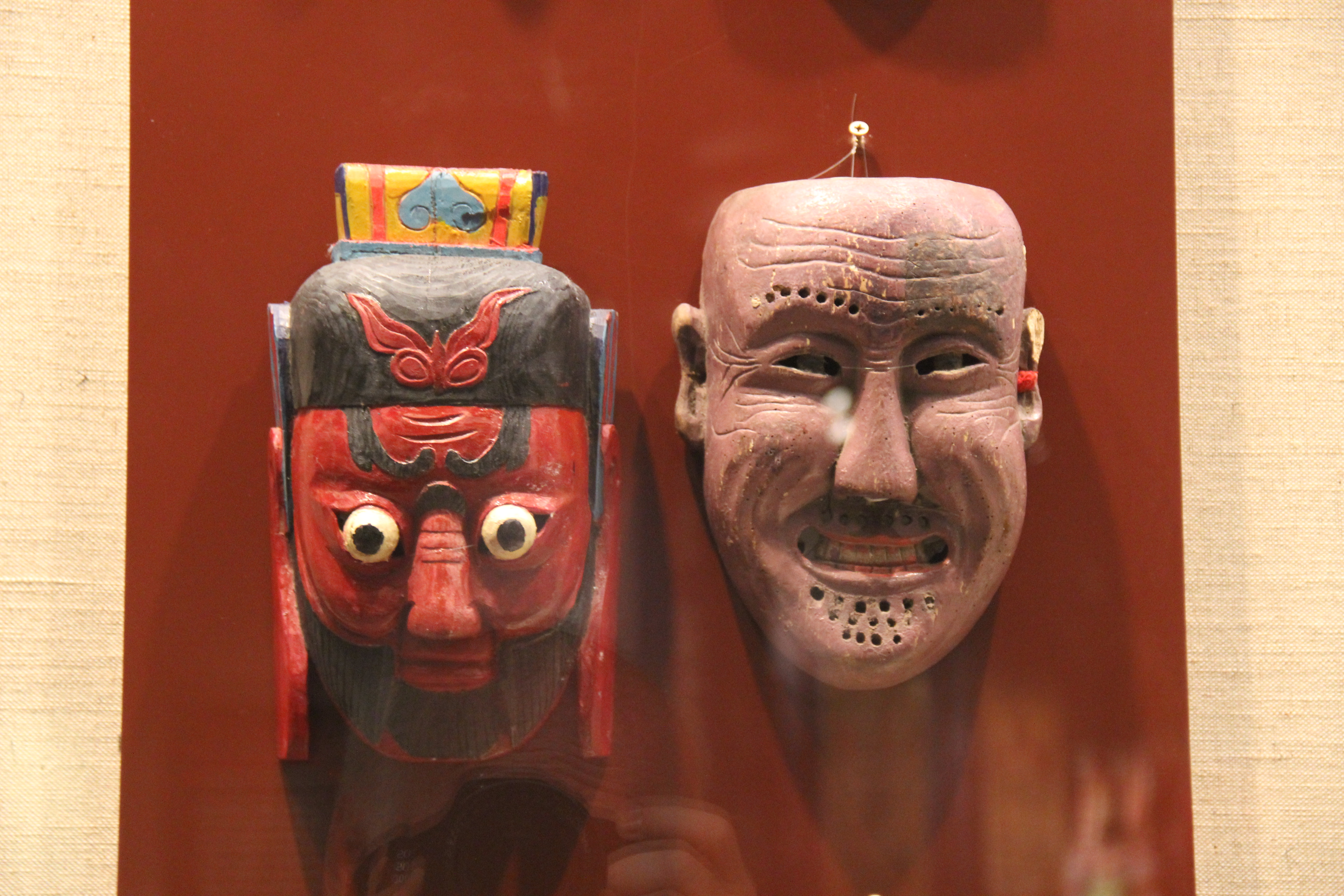

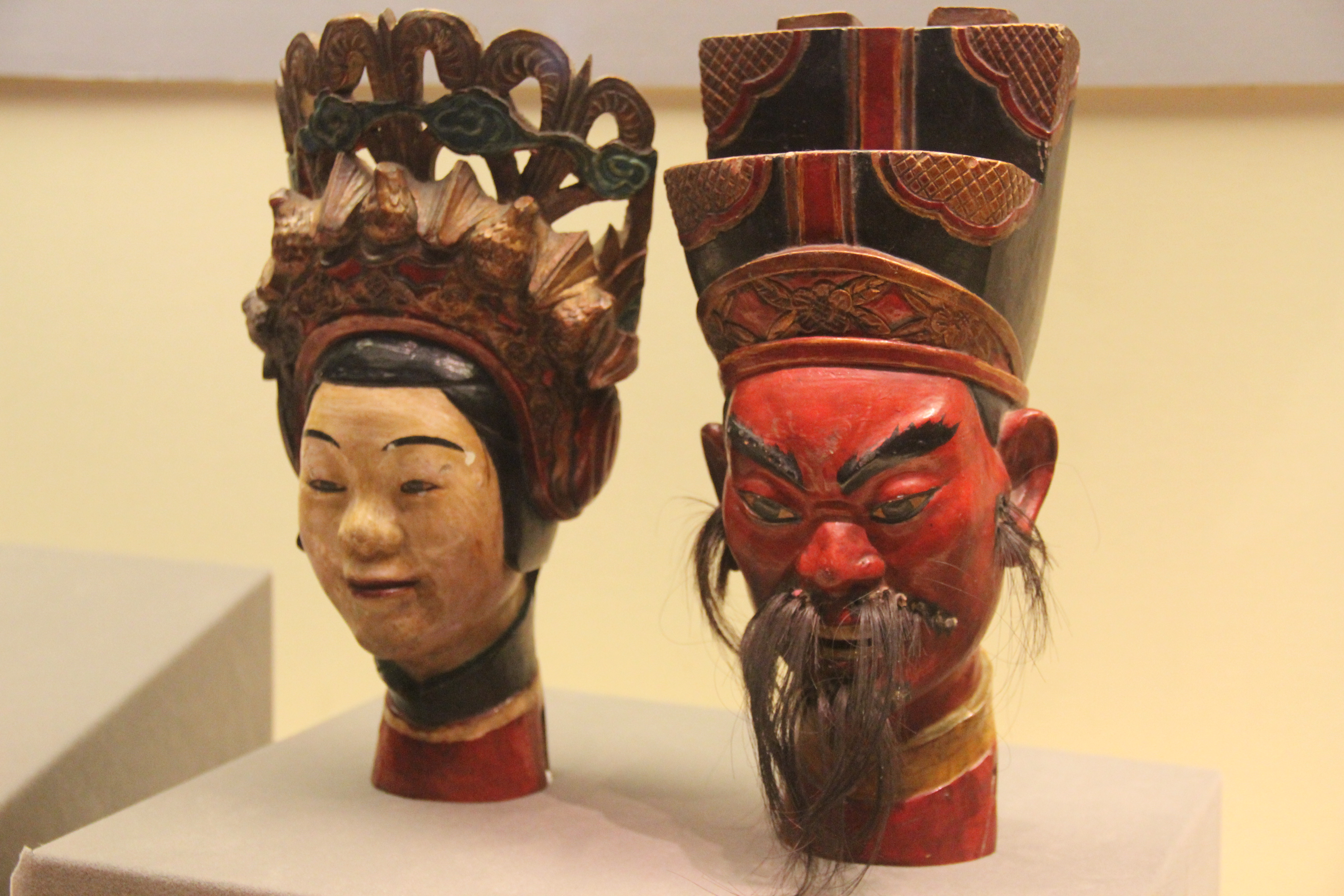

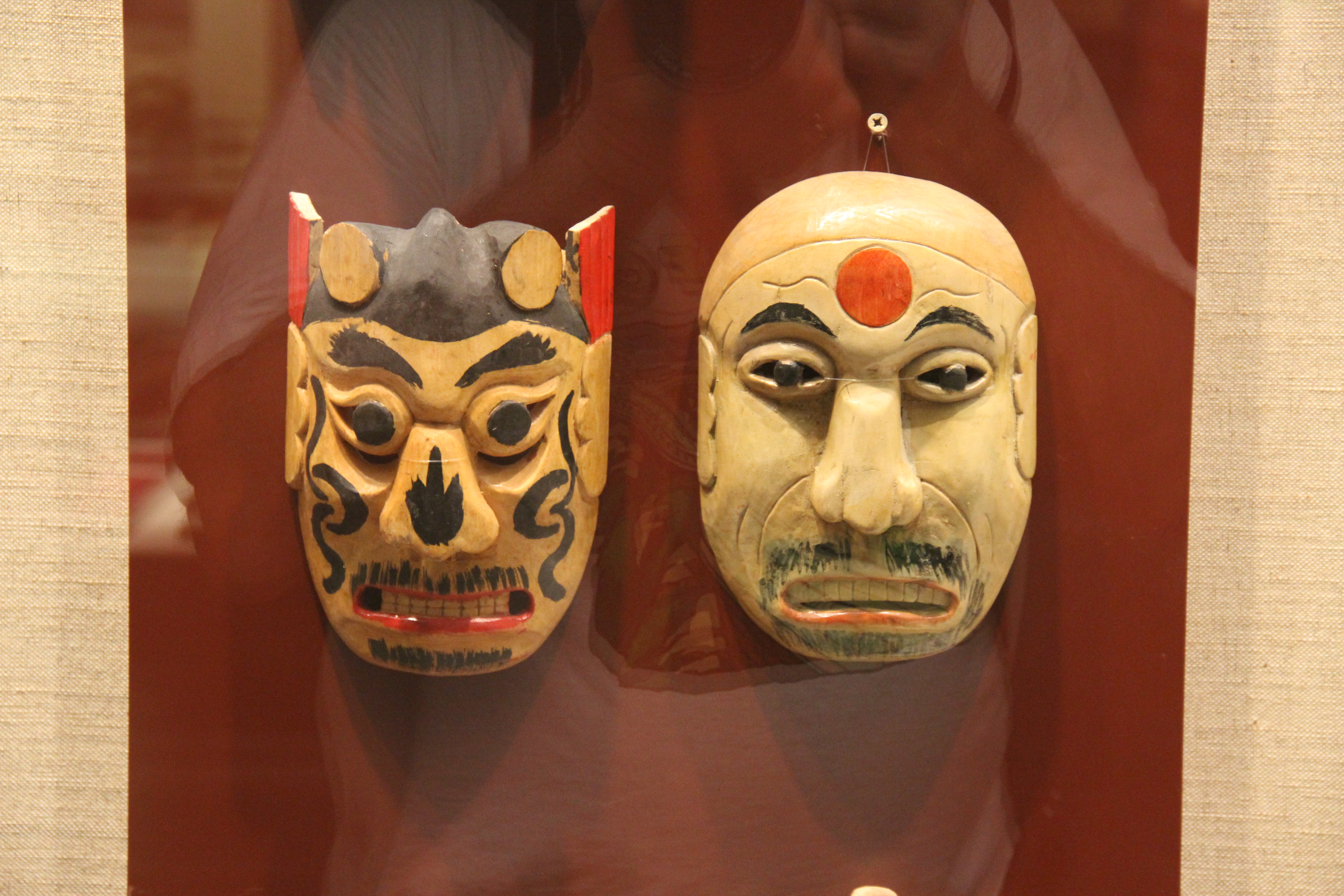

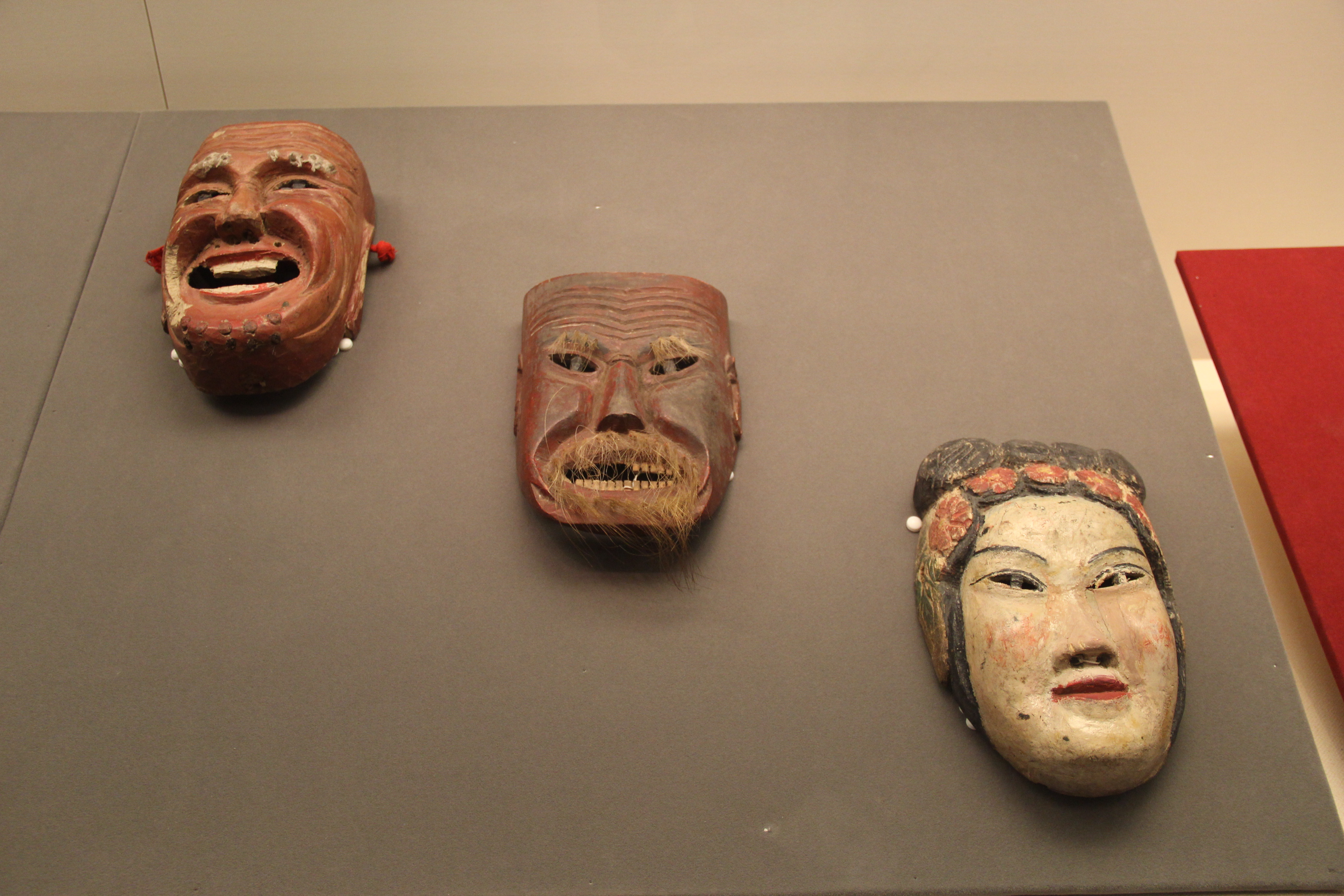

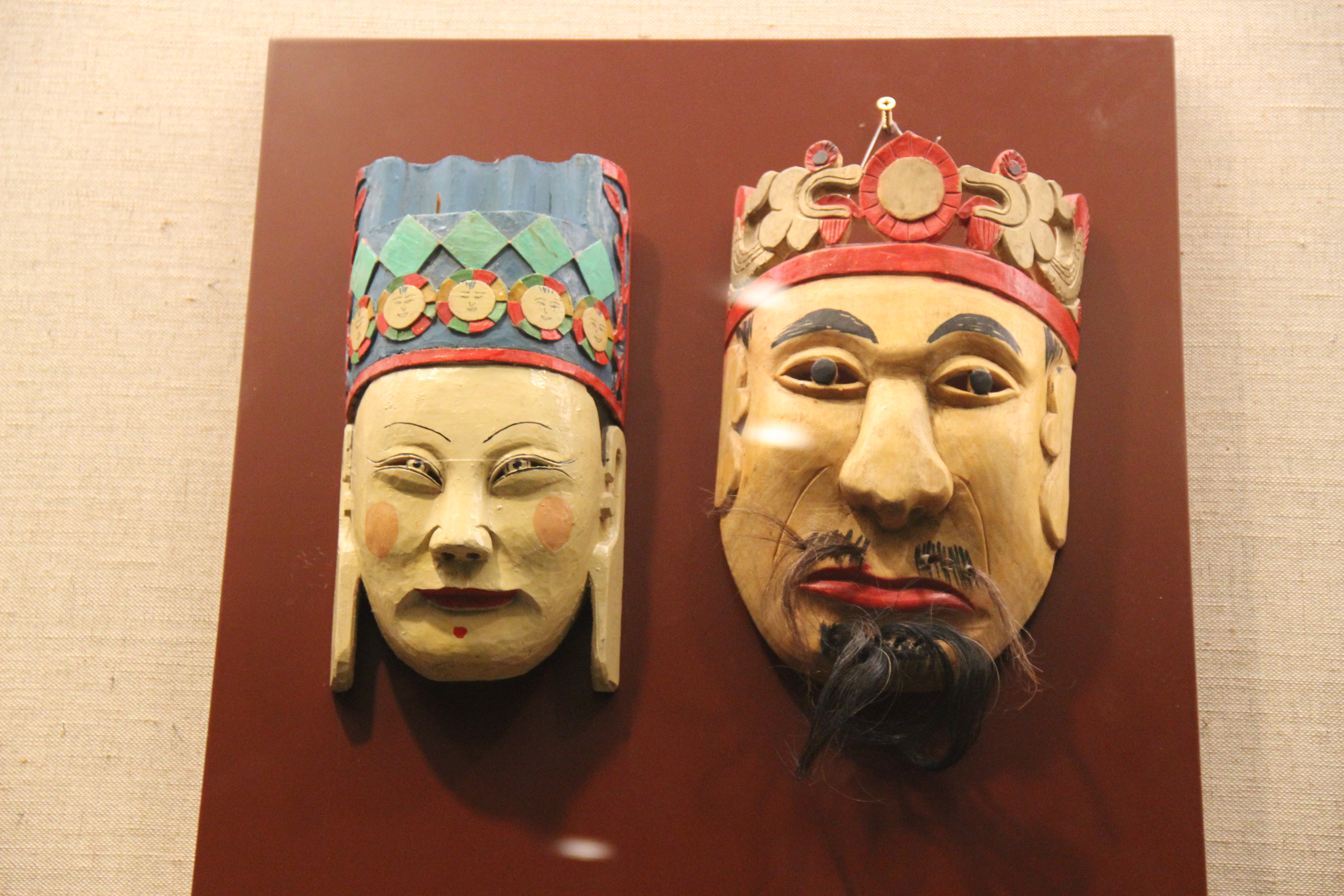

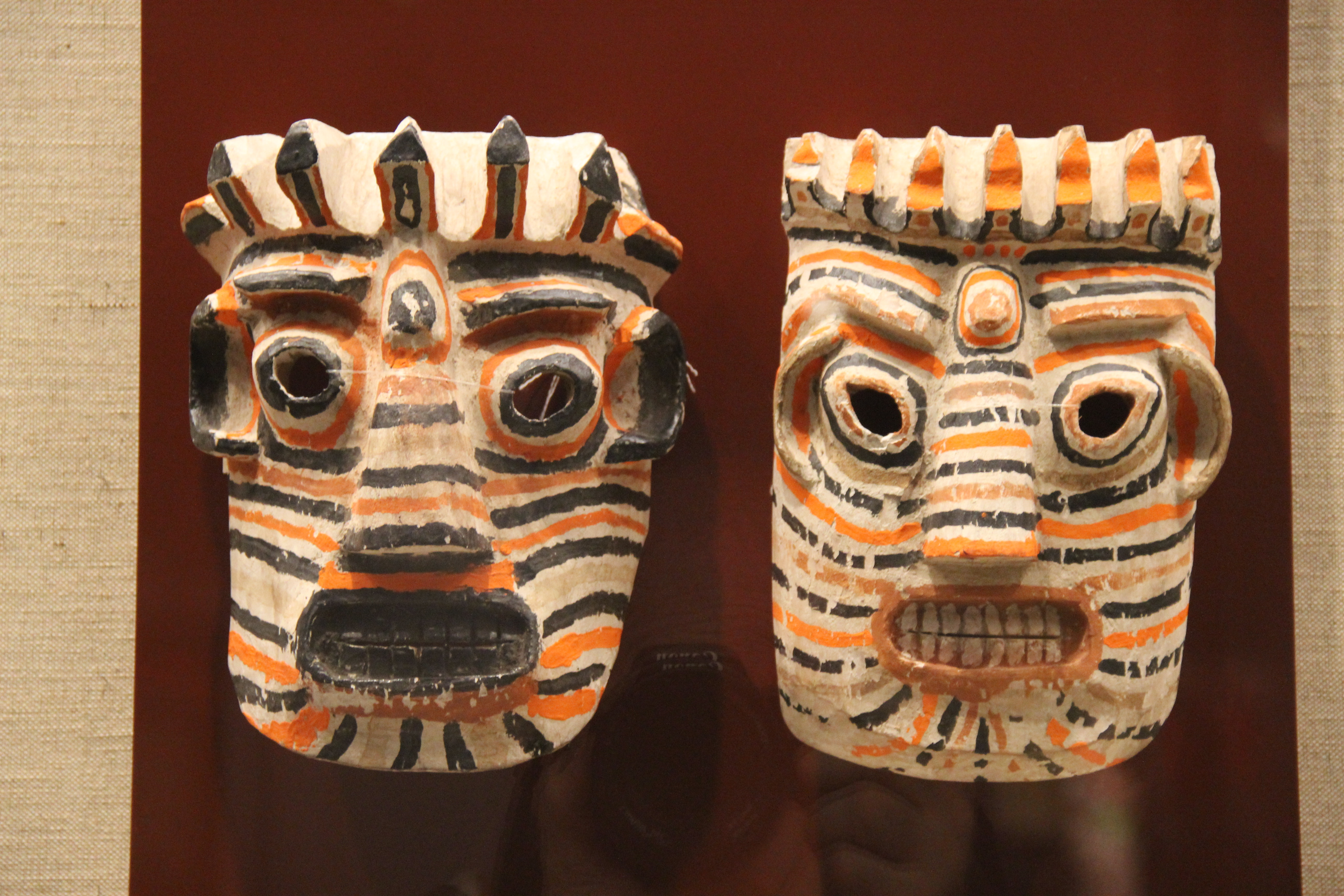

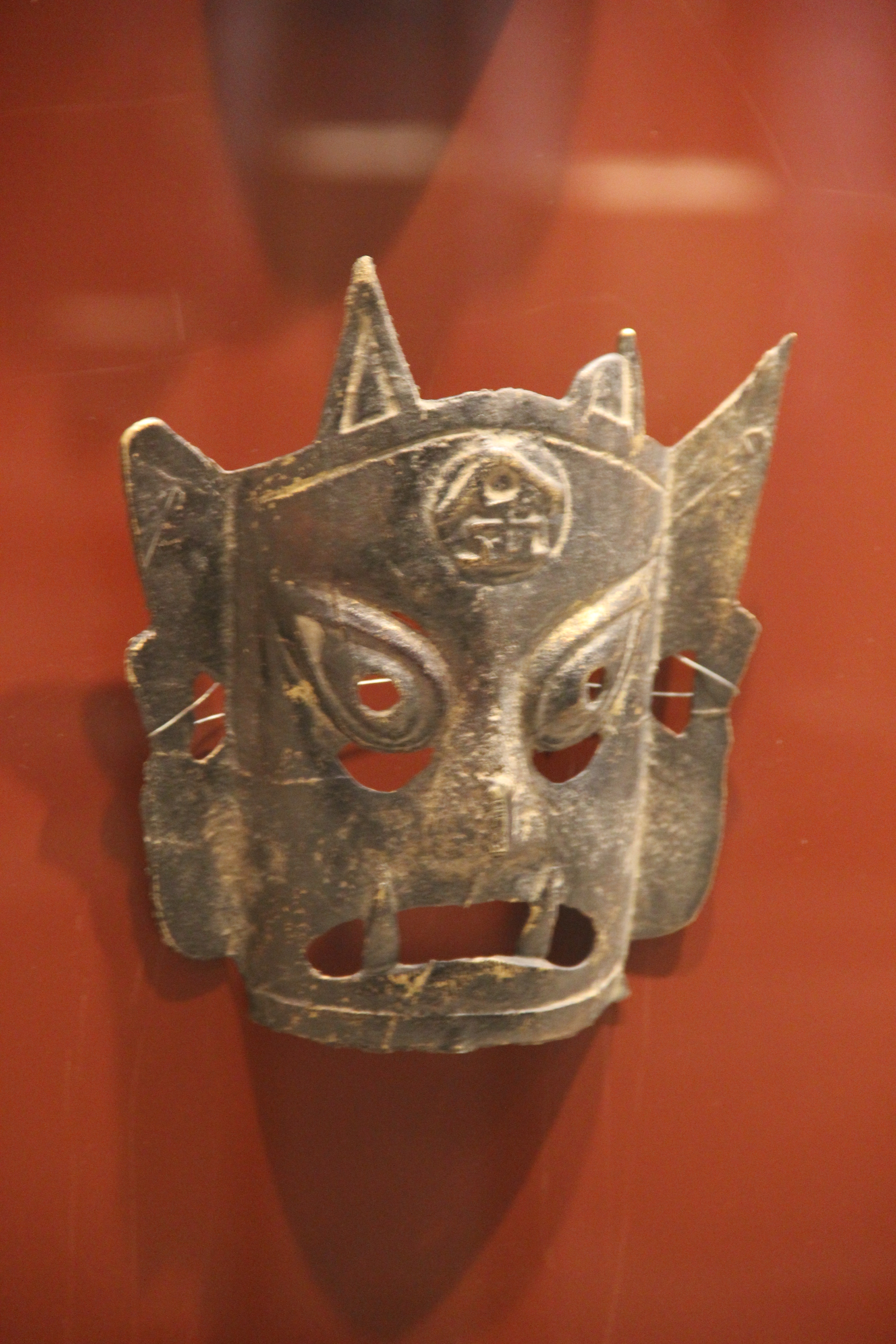

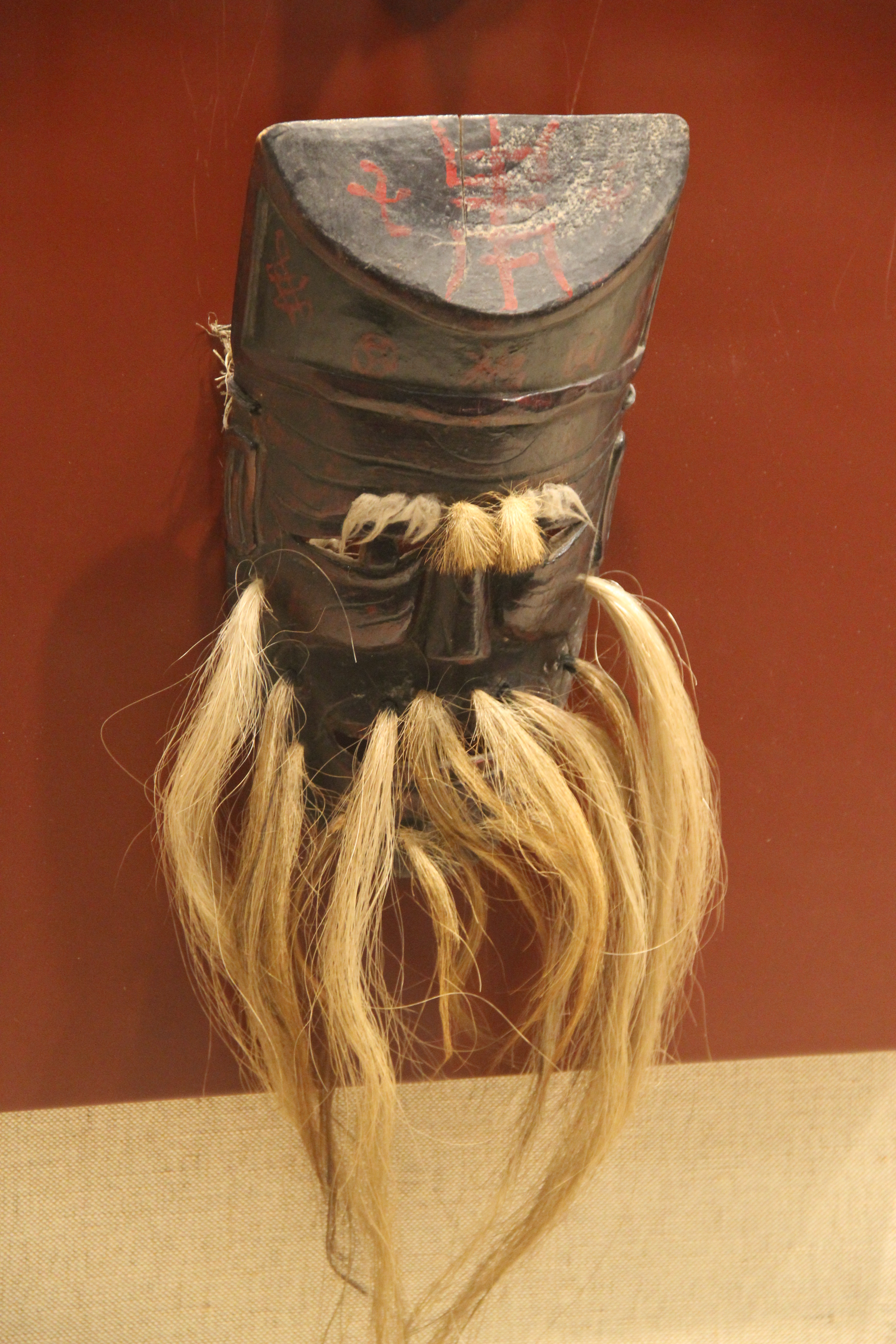

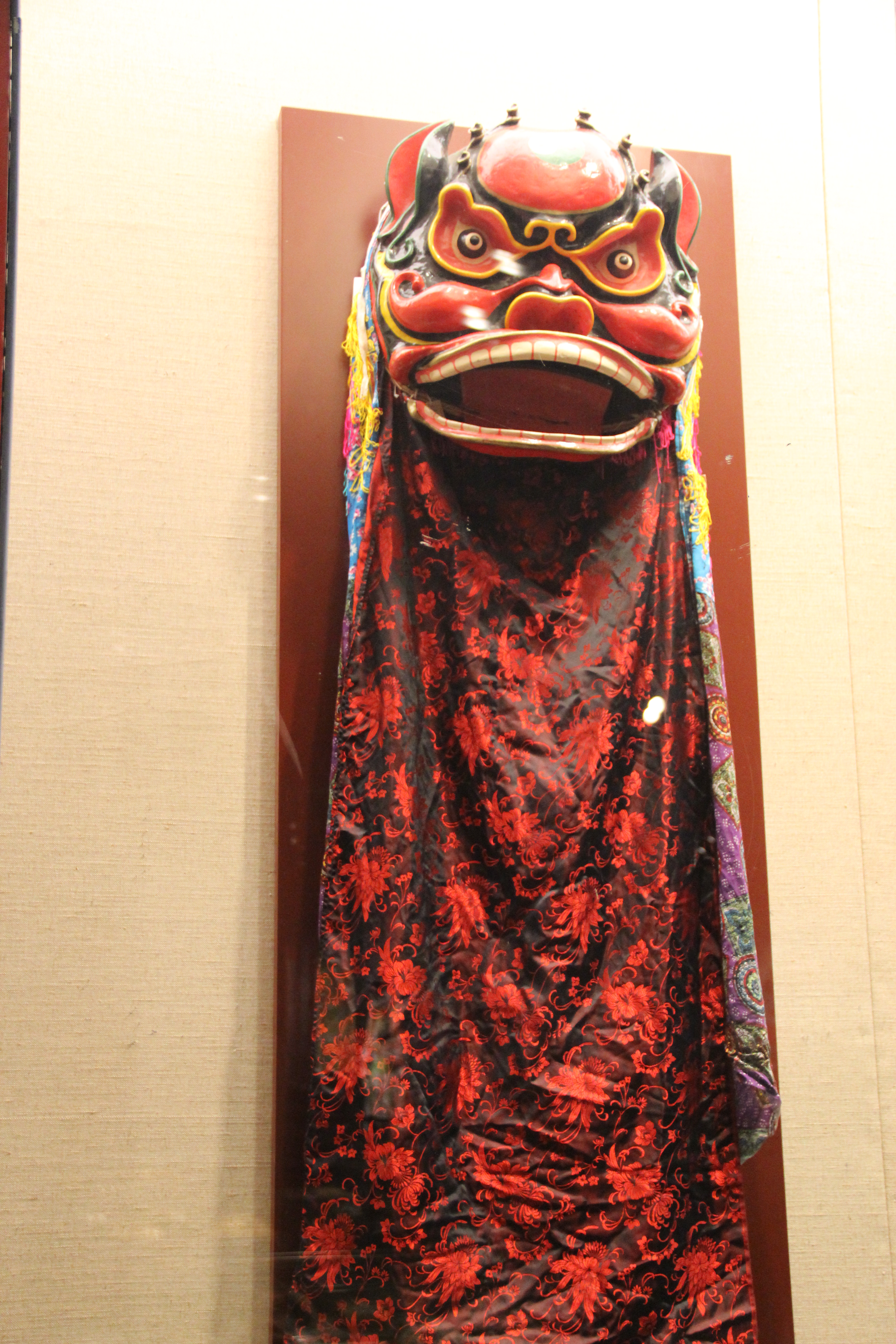

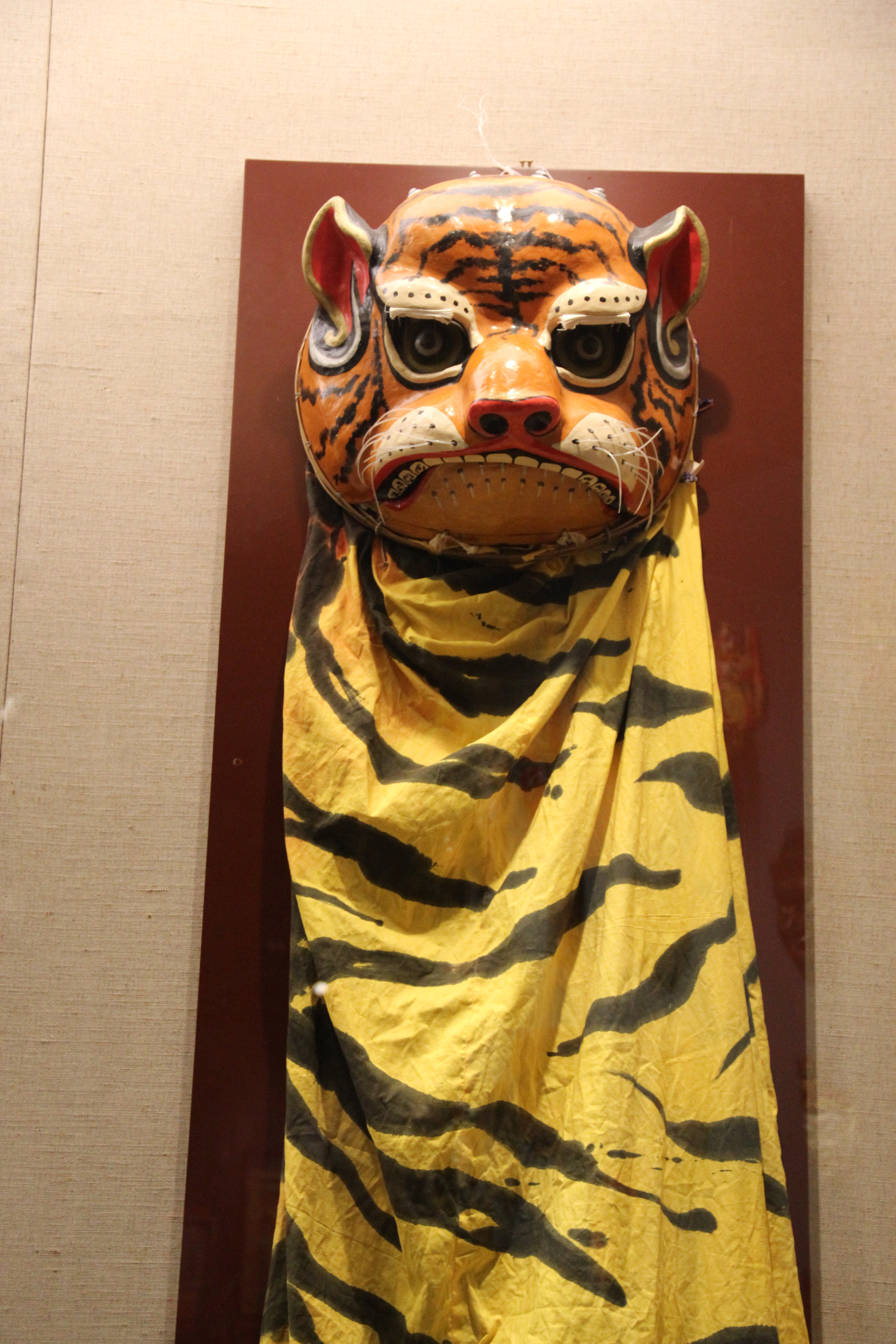

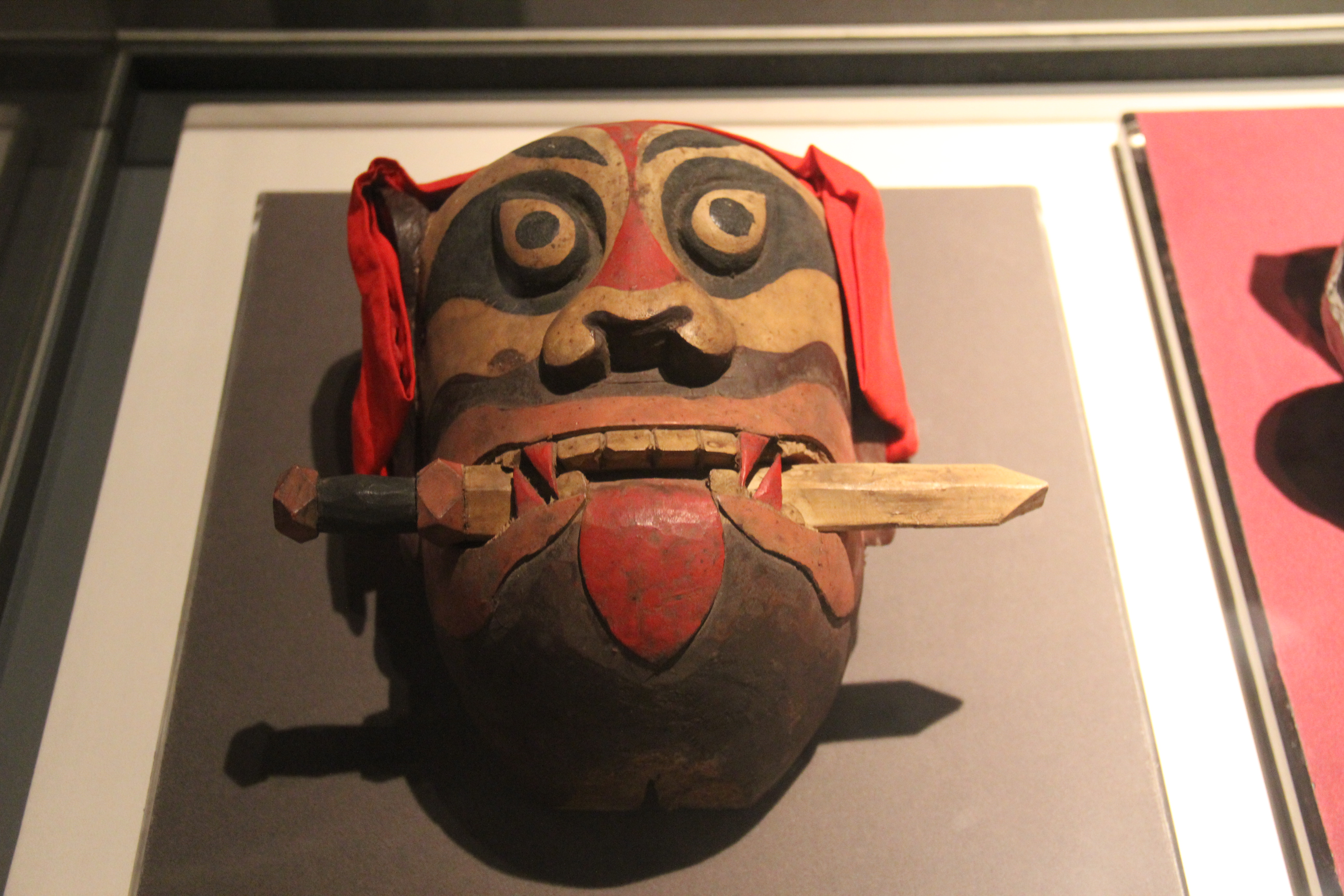

== See also ==
- Fangxiangshi
- Nuoism
- Noh
- Cham dance
