= Fangxiangshi =

Chinese ritual exorcist

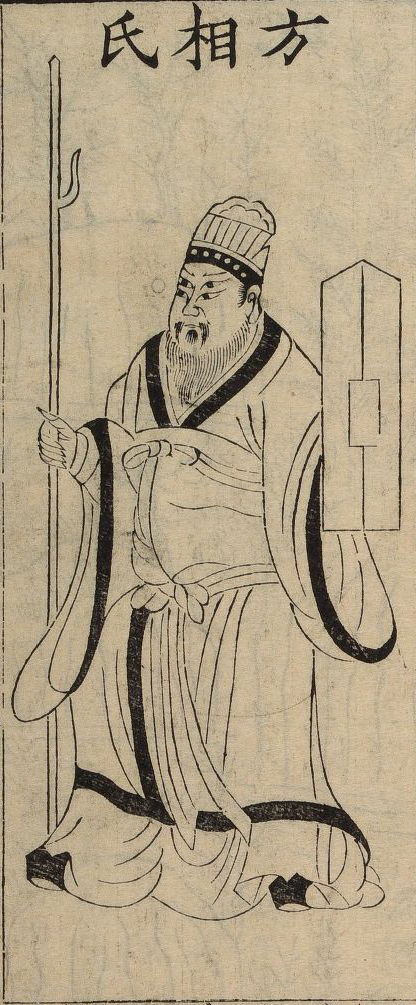
- Fangxiangshi as shown in Sanlitu (三禮圖)

Chinese name
- Chinese: 方相氏
Transcriptions
Standard Mandarin
- Hanyu Pinyin: fāngxiàngshì
- Wade–Giles: fang-hsiang-shih
Middle Chinese
- Middle Chinese: pjangsjangdzyeX
Old Chinese
- Baxter–Sagart (2014): paŋ[s]aŋk.deʔ

Korean name
- Hangul: 방상씨
Transcriptions
- Revised Romanization: bangsangssi
- McCune–Reischauer: pangsangssi

Japanese name
- Kanji: 方相氏
- Hiragana: ほうそうし
Transcriptions
- Revised Hepburn: hōsōshi

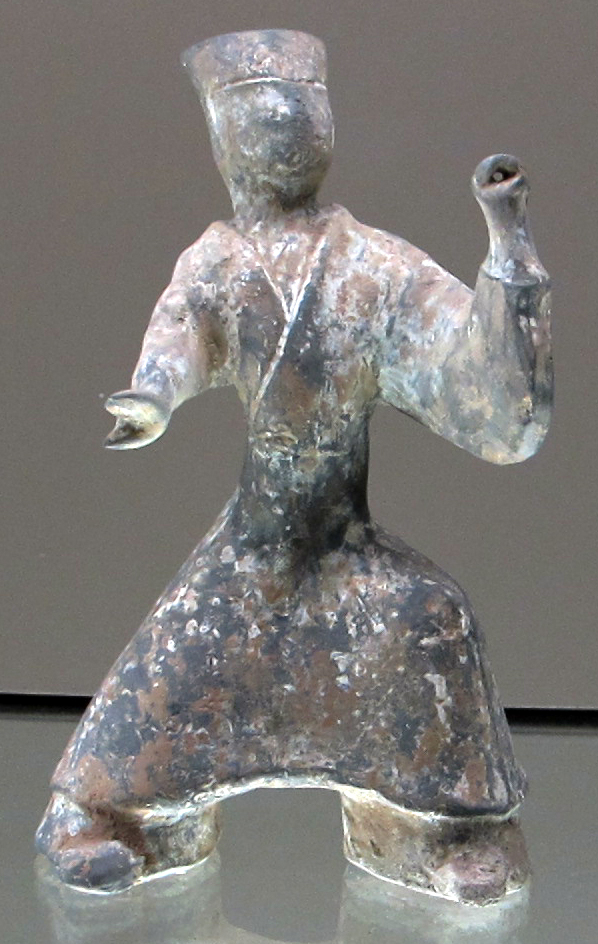
Chinese Eastern Han dynasty (25-220 CE) tomb guardian figure identified as a Fangxiangshi

The fangxiangshi (Chinese: 方相氏) or just Fangxiang was a Chinese ritual exorcist. His primary duties were orchestrating the seasonal Nuo ritual to chase out disease-causing demons from houses and buildings, and leading a funeral procession to exorcize corpse-eating wangliang spirits away from a burial chamber. Ancient Chinese texts record that he wore a bearskin with four golden eyes, and carried a lance and shield to expel malevolent spirits. From the Han dynasty through the Tang dynasty (3rd century BCE to 10th century CE), fangxiangshi were official wu-shaman specialists in the imperially sanctioned Chinese state religion; after the Tang, they were adapted into popular folk religion and symbolized by wearing a four-eyed mask.

In the present day, the fangxiangshi is a masked character in Chinese Nuo opera, and continues as the Japanese equivalent hōsōshi 方相氏 exorcist in Shinto ceremonies.

== Etymology ==
The obscure etymology of fāngxiàngshì is a subject of disagreement but has been translated as "one who sees in all (four) directions", "he who scrutinizes for evil in many directions", and "one who orients unwanted spirits in the direction to which they belong". The name combines three characters, with the following Old Chinese pronunciations and meanings:

- paŋ 方 "square, a regular thing, side, region, country; two boats lashed side by side, raft; just now, to begin; method, law, norm, standard"
- *saŋh 相 "look at, inspect; assist, help; assistant, minister" (also pronounced xiāng < *saŋ 相 "each other, mutually")
- *geʔ 氏 "an honorific which is suffixed to place names ("the lord of X"), kinship terms ("uncle X"), feudal and official titles ("lord/lady" X); clan"

Scholars agree that shi < *geʔ is the common Chinese honorific or clan name Shi, but construe fangxiang < *paŋsaŋh in various ways. Fang 方 is also a common Chinese surname.

The earliest interpretation was Zheng Xuan's (2nd century CE) Zhouli commentary (see below). Zheng explains fāngxiàng(shì) as fàngxiǎng (放想), substituting fàng (放; "put away; banish") for fāng (方) and xiǎng (想; "think; imagine") for xiàng (相). This ambiguous fàngxiǎng (放想) gloss is translated as "expellers of formidable things", "to give release to one's thinking . . . so as to have an awesome and terrifying appearance", and "to cause visions to be forthcoming; to conjure up visions". Boltz says Bodde misunderstood this term because Zheng was reaffirming that xiàng (相) means not just "observe; scrutinize", but "vision; image; phantasy", cognate with xiǎng (想; "to draw up a mental image; vision"), as well as with xiàng (象; "image; representation"). Therefore, Boltz concludes it was not the appearance of the fangxiangshi that is important, but "the visions which he brings forth (and which presumably only he can see) that are crucial. In this sense he should be called the Master of Visions, or Imaginator, or Phantasmagoricist."

Zheng Xuan's commentary to the Zhouli description of a fangxiang striking the four corners of the burial chamber with his lance and expelling the fangliang (see below) identifies this fangliang (方良) demon with the wangliang (罔兩) demon, also known as wangxiang (罔象). Ying Shao's (c. 195 CE) Fengsu Tongyi quotes this Zhouli passage with wangxiang for fangliang in explaining the origins of Chinese customs of placing thuja (arborvitae) trees and stone tigers in graveyards.

On the tomb a thuja is planted and at the head of the path a stone tiger. In the Chou li, "On the day of burial the fang-hsiang chief enters the pit to drive out the Wang-hsiang." The Wang-hsiang likes to eat the liver and brain of the deceased. People cannot constantly have the fang-hsiang stand by the side of the tomb to bar it. But the Wang-hsiang fears the tiger and the thuja. Thus the tiger and thuja are placed before the tomb.

The common interpretation of the fang in fangxiang is that it denotes the sìfāng (四方; "the four quarters/directions; every side/direction"), as ritually symbolized by the four golden eyes on the bearskin signifying the ability of a fangxiangshi to see in all directions. According to Dallas McCurley, the early Chinese believed that "the forces of rain, wind, flood, and drought often came to the climatically vulnerable Yellow River Valley from the sifang."

Boltz's review of Bodde's book agrees that taking the fundamental sense of fangxiang as "seer" is generally accurate, but believes that the binomial term fangxiang < Old Chinese *pjwang-sjang originated as a dimidiation of the word *sjang- < Proto-Chinese **bsjang- "seer". Thus meaning "not so much "one who sees in all directions" (though it may well have already been semanticized as that very early) as "one who conjures up visions, or images, phantasies."

Many writers have noted the remarkable phonetic similarities among the names for the ritual fangxiangshi and the fangliang, wangliang, and wangxiang demons he exorcised; and some scholars such as Chen Mengjia, Kobayashi Taichirō, and William Boltz have theorized that the fangxiangshi exorcist was a personification of these demons, and was "in effect exorcising himself". In this understanding, the devouring exorcist and devoured creatures were ultimately identical. Boltz suggests the possibility that the matching names fangxiang(shi), fangliang, wangliang, and wangxiang are all derived from the same Proto-Chinese **BZjang "see" etymon, with him as a "Master of Visions" or "Imaginator" and them as "visions" or "specters" from the Latin spectrum "appearance; apparition", and to use the same root, the fangxiangshi "was in fact exorcising images, or visions, of himself."

== Translations ==
While it is comparatively easier to transliterate Chinese 方相氏 alphabetically than to elucidate it, some scholars have made translations. The first in a Western language may have been French sinologist Édouard Biot's "inspecteurs de region" or "preservateur universel".

English translations include

- "Rescuer of the Country; inspectors or rescuers of the country to the four quarters"
- "a 'doctor' who has two functions, he prescribes medicines, and practises the art of physiognomy"
- "he who scrutinizes for evil in many directions"
- "one who conjures up visions ... Master of Visions, or Imaginator, or Phantasmagoricist"
- "one who sees in all (four) directions"
- "square-faced exorcist"
- "direction (fang)-orienting master; one who orients unwanted spirits in the direction to which they belong"

Laufer's interpretation takes fang to mean fangshi (方士; "alchemist; doctor; exorcist") and xiang to mean rénxiàng (人相; "look at and appraise; practice physiognomy"). Bodde's translation "he who scrutinizes for evil spirits in many directions" is based upon taking fang as meaning sifang "four/all directions" and taking xiang in its verbal sense of "observe, scrutinize" comparable with "physiognomize".

== Early references ==
According to the Chinese classics, fangxiangshi originated in the late Eastern Zhou dynasty (771-256 BCE), were officially employed by emperors from the Han dynasty (206 BCE-220 CE) through the Tang dynasty (618-907), and subsequently continued as a private practice up to the present day.

=== Han dynasty ===
The earliest detailed description of fangxiangshi is found in the (c. 3rd century BCE) Zhouli "Rites of Zhou" Xiaguan (夏官; "Offices of Summer") section.

The first context details the types and numbers of assistants for each official rank, including over 40 to support the fangxiangshi: 4 kuángfū (狂夫; "crazy men; mediums"), 8 diviners with 6 subordinates, 2 accountants, 2 scribes, 2 menials, and 20 runners.

The second Zhouli context includes the fangxiangshi under the section describing official duties of the nánwū (男巫; "male shaman/medium"):

At the annual Great Exorcism (nuo 儺), when the Nanwu play a central role: after either presenting offerings or shooting arrows (which of the two remains unclear) at the evil spirits in the four directions, they (according to Zheng Xuan) accompany them outside, away from human habitations"

The received Zhouli text has zèng (贈; "to present") but Zheng Xuan mentions an old variant of zèng (矰; "to shoot arrows").

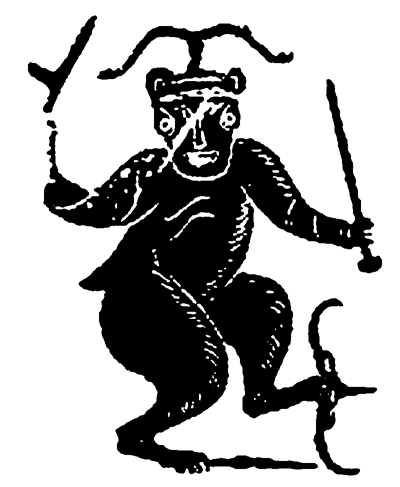
Chi You is frequently depicted with four eyes and with legs of a bear, similar to a fangxiangshi

The subsequent fangxiangshi context says,

In his official function, he wears [over his head] a bearskin having four eyes of gold, and is clad in a black upper garment and a red lower garment. Grasping his lance and brandishing his shield, he leads the many officials to perform the seasonal exorcism (Nuo), searching through houses and driving out pestilences. ... When there is a great funeral, he goes in advance of the coffin, and upon its arrival at the tomb, when it is being inserted into the burial chamber, he strikes the four corners [of the chamber] with his lance and expels the Fang-liang. (48)

Zheng Xuan's commentary glosses méng (蒙; "cover; dark; blind; ignorant") as meaning mào (冒; "to cover; see"), that is "to wear over one's head"; and explains "the bear skin worn over one's head to expel the demon of pestilences is [what is known] today as qitou [魌頭 "ghost head; demon mask"]." As mentioned above (see Etymology), Zheng's commentary identifies the fangliang (方良) demon with the wangliang (罔兩) or wangxiang (罔象) demon.

Zhouli scholars concur in interpreting the four golden eyes on the bearskin to symbolize the ability of a fangxiangshi to see simultaneously in all sìfāng (四方; "four directions"), as well as striking all sìyú (四隅; "four corners") of the tomb with a lance to scare away the corpse-eating wangliang.

However, Zhouli interpreters differ whether the fangxiangshi was covered by a bearskin cloak or mask, owing to the ambiguous Classical Chinese phrase 熊皮黃金四目 (literally "bear skin yellow gold four eyes"), and Zheng Xuan's comparison with a qitou "demon mask". Translations are frequently a bearskin ("don the hide of a young bear ornamented with four eyes of gold"), sometimes a bearskin mask ("four-eyed bear mask", McCurley, or even both ("covered with a bear's skin and donning a face mask with four golden eyes").

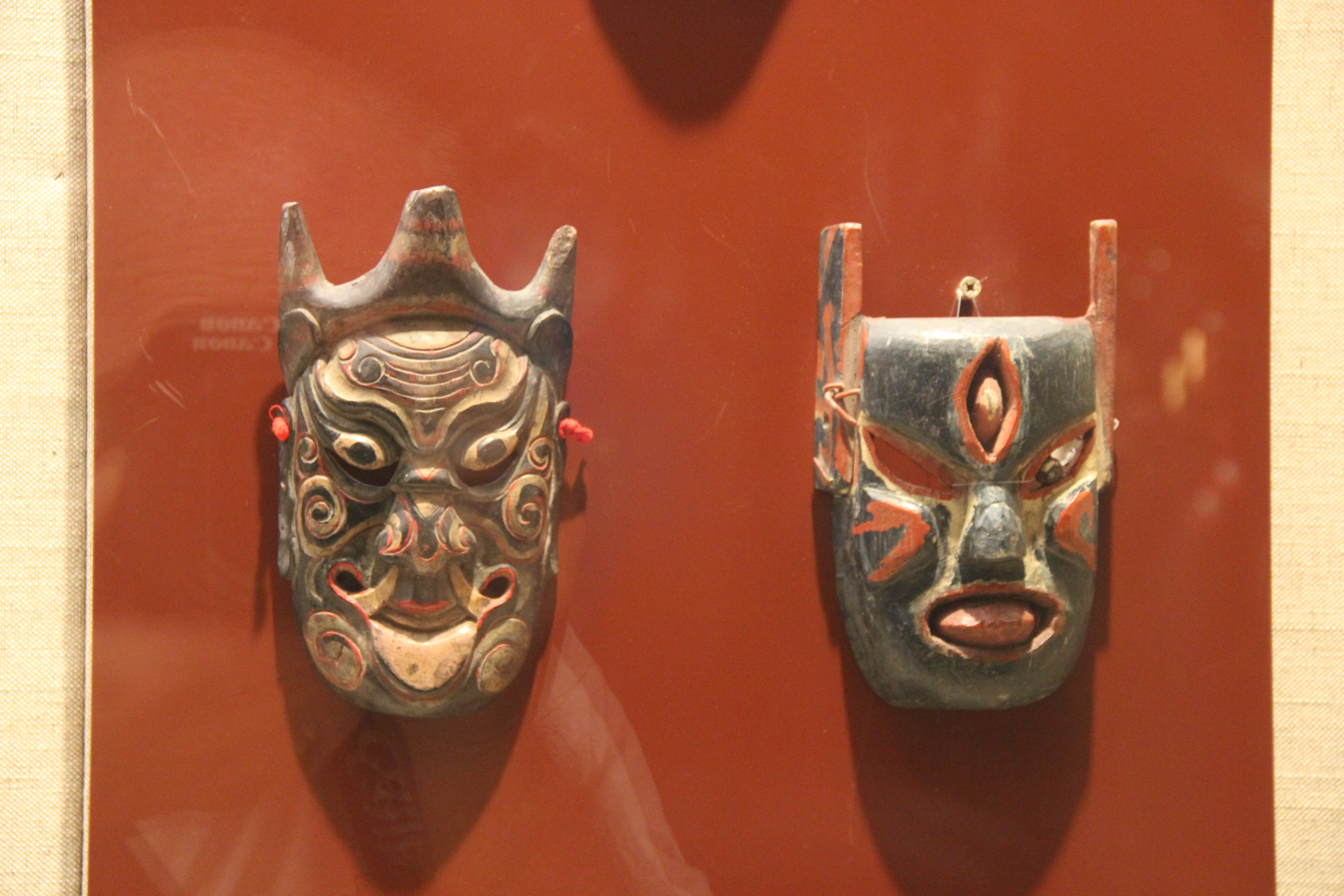
Example of Nuo opera masks.

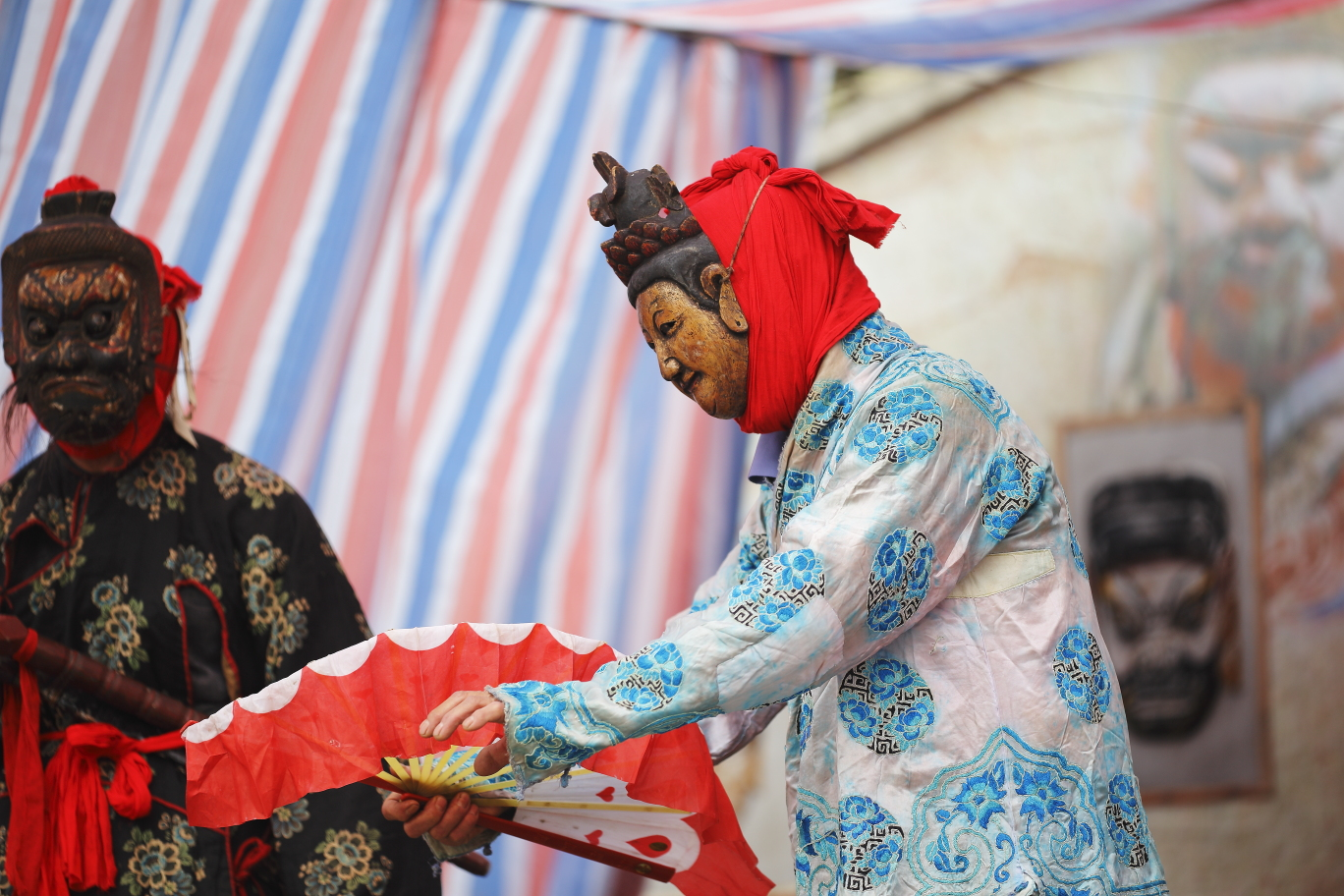
Modern Nuo opera dancers.

The Han polymath Zhang Heng's (2nd century CE) "Dongjing fu" poem about the capital Luoyang contemporaneously describes fangxiang(shi) at the Nuo ritual.

At the end of the year the great no takes place for the purpose of driving off all spectres. The fang-siang carry their spears, wu and hih hold their bundles of reed. Ten thousand lads with red heads and black clothes, with bows of peach wood and arrows of thorny jujube shoot at random all around. Showers of potsherds and pebbles come down like rain, infallibly killing strong spectres as well as the weak. Flaming torches run after these beings, so that a sparkling and streaming glare chases the red plague to all sides; thereupon they destroy them in the imperial moats and break down the suspension bridges (to prevent their return). In this way they attack ch‘i and mei, strike at wild and ferocious beings, cleave sinuous snakes, beat out the brains of fang-liang, imprison keng-fu in the clear and chilly waters, and drown nü-pah in the waters animated by gods. They cut asunder the khwei and the hü, as also the wang-siang; they mutilate the ye-chung, and exterminate the yiu-kwang. The eight spirits (cardinal points of the Universe) thereby quiver; how much more must this be the case with the ki, the yuh and the pih-fang. The land of Tu-shoh, affords protection by peach branches, the effects of which are enhanced by Yuh-lei and Shen-tu, who on the other side, with ropes of rush in their hands, by means of their sharp eyesight spy out the darkest corners, in order to catch the spectres which still remain after the chase. The houses in the capital thus being purged to their most secluded parts, and delivered from everything undesirable, the Yin and the Yang may unite harmoniously, and all beings and things thus be produced in due time.

The (5th century) Book of the Later Han also describes fangxiangshi in the Nuo exorcism.

One day before the sacrifice of the end of the year the great no is celebrated, called expulsion of epidemical disease. The ritual of it is the following — From among the apprentices of the inner Yellow Gate of the Palace, one hundred and twenty of ten, eleven or twelve years are selected to act as 'lads'; they are dressed with red bonnets and black coats, and they carry large hand-drums. The fang-siang shi with four eyes of gold and masked with bearskins, wearing black coats and red skirts, grasp their lances and wield their shields. There are also twelve animals with feathers or hairs, and with horns. These people start their work at the inner Yellow Gate, under command of a Chamberlain in general employ, to expel maleficent spectres from the Forbidden Palace. [Shortly before dawn, the 120 boys and all the court officials gather together and repeat a chant listing 12 demon-eating spirits, "Jiazuo 甲作 devours calamities, Feiwei 胇胃 devours tigers ..."] These twelve divinities are herewith ordered to chase away evil and misfortune, to scorch your bodies, seize your bones and joints, cut your flesh in pieces, tear out your lungs and bowels. If you do not get quickly away, the stragglers among you will become their food. Now the fang-siang are set to work. Together with those twelve animals (representing these twelve demon-devourers) they lump about screaming, making three tours round about the inner Palace buildings in front and behind, and with their torches they escort the pestilential disease out of the front gate. Outside this gate, swift horsemen take over the torches and leave the Palace through the Marshal’s Gate, on the outside of which they transfer them to horsemen of the fifth army-corps, who thereupon drive the spectres into the Loh river. In every mansion of the official world, men with wooden masks and representing animals may act as leaders of the performers of the no. When the ceremony is finished, keng of peachwood are put up, with Yuh-lei and ropes of reed, after which the performers and the officers in attendance on the throne stop their work. Ropes of reed, lances, and sticks of peach wood are presented by the emperor to the highest ministers, commanders, and special and general feudal rulers.

The syntax of this fangxiangshi description differs from the Zhouli: "the fangxiangshi [wears] four golden eyes [and] is covered by a bearskin" (方相氏黃金四目蒙熊皮).

=== Southern and Northern dynasties ===
Han-era fangxiangshi and Nuo ritual traditions continued to be followed during the turbulent Southern and Northern dynasties period (420-589), which was an age of civil war and large-scale migration.

The Book of Qi history of the Southern Qi dynasty (479-502) records that Nuo rituals were

performed on the last day of the year by two groups, each of 120 lads, and twelve animals headed by drums and wind instruments. The gates of the wards and of the city walls were flung open, and the emperor in everyday attire contemplated the no from his throne, in the midst of his offices. With rolling drums the procession entered the Palace through the western-gate, passed through all parts of it in two divisions, even mounting the storeys and towers; the fang-siang and the twelve animals hopped, jumped, and cried, and having passed through the south gate, they spread in six directions till they reached the city-walls.

During the Sui dynasty (581-618 CE), the official ritual restricted using fangxiangshi exorcists to funerals of higher-ranking shi "scholar-officials"; officers of the 1st-4th degrees could use fangxiang, but those of the 5th-7th degrees could only use qitou ghost masks.

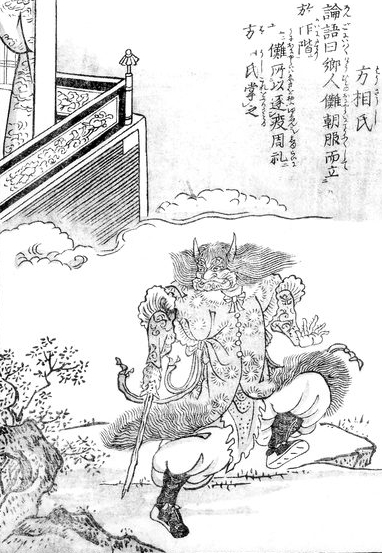
Japanese Hōsōshi 方相氏 exorcist illustration from the (c. 1781) Konjaku Hyakki Shūi

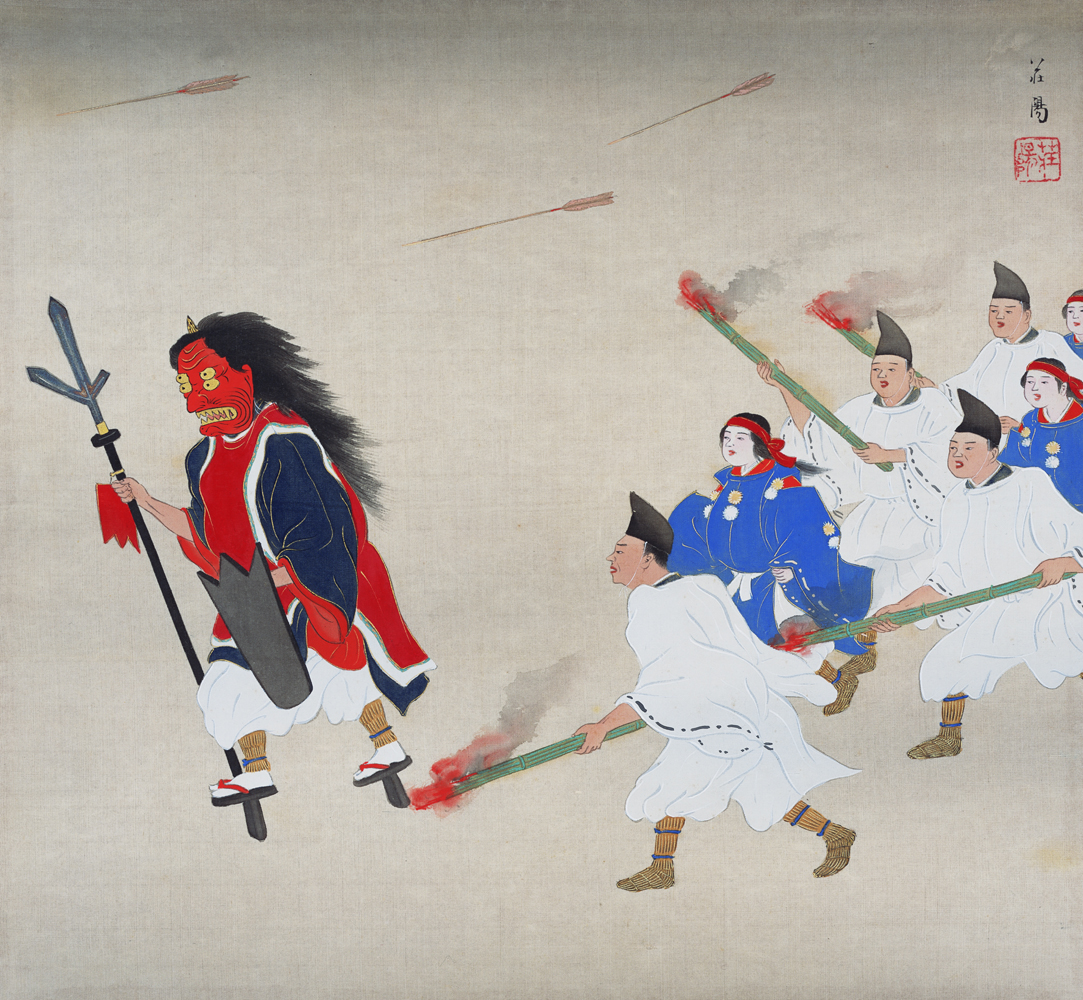
Japanese Shinto ceremonial Hōsōshi at Yoshida Shrine, (1928) painting by Nakajima Sōyō 中島荘陽

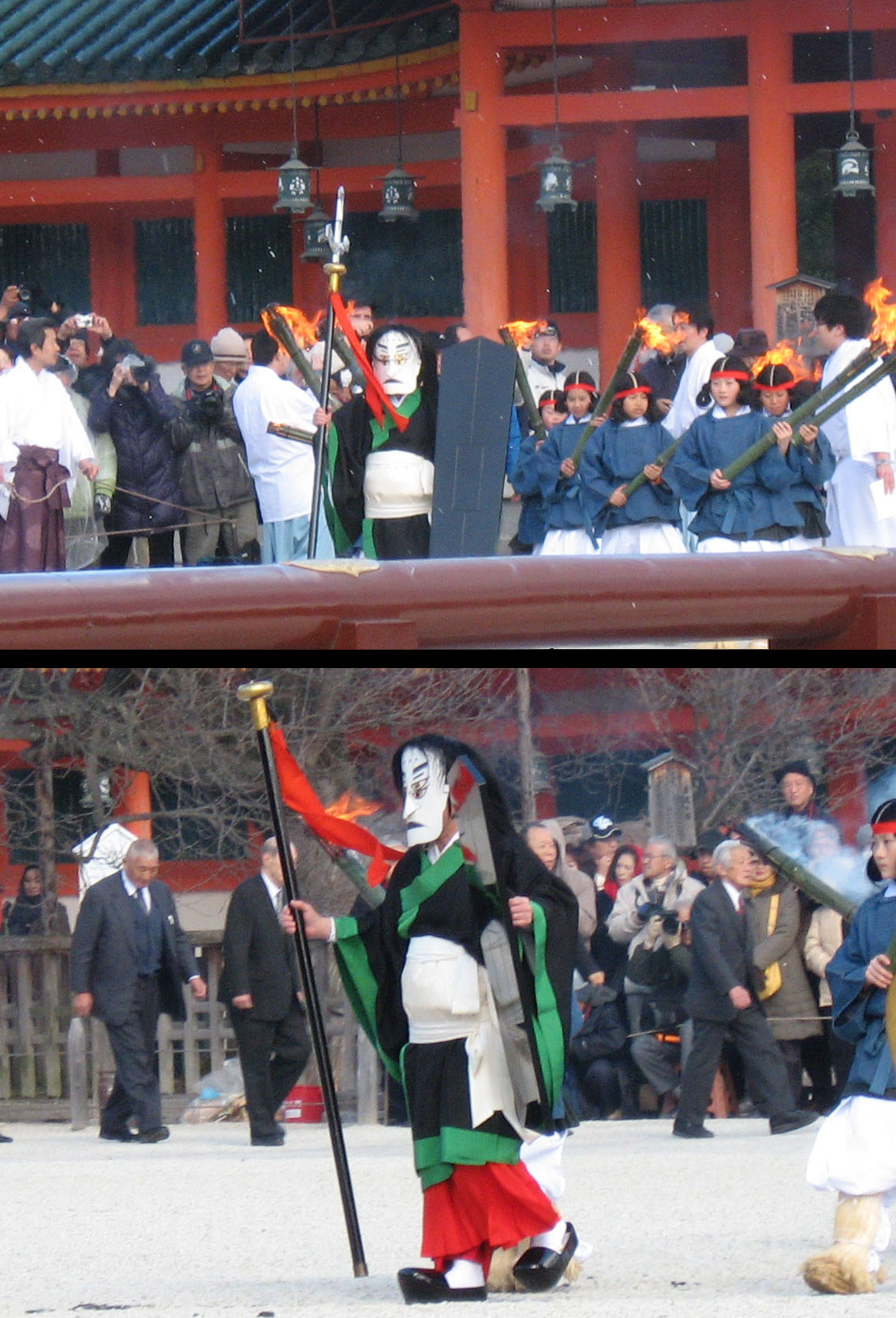
Japanese Shinto ceremonial Hōsōshi at Heian Shrine (2010)

=== Tang dynasty ===
The Tang dynasty (618-907) was a golden age in Chinese history during which the state religion continued fangxiangshi traditions and further regulated their details.

The (732) Great Tang Ritual Regulations of the Kaiyuan Era (713-742, Emperor Xuanzong of Tang) says that in funeral processions, "behind the carriage in which the soul-tablet was conveyed, came the carriage of the fang-siang, which, however, was to be replaced by a carriage with an ugly head [qitou] at funerals of officers of any grade below the fifth." This ritual text also gave instructions for celebrating the Nuo ritual in the provinces.

Four fang-siang were to be used, with four precentors [唱率; chàngshuài; "song leaders"], and by chiefs of first class governments sixty lads besides; chiefs of governments of the second or the third order might employ forty lads, and in the districts no more than twenty lads might be employed, with one fang-siang and one precentor; besides there might be four drummers and four whip-bearers. Such purification of official mansions and cities was to be accompanied by a sacrifice at the gates to the yin spirits, and concluded by burial of the sacrificial flesh and wine.

Duan Chengshi's (8th century) Miscellaneous Morsels from Youyang differentiates qitou (魌頭; "ghost mask") types, those with four eyes are named fangxiang and those with two eyes are named qī (僛; "dancers").

The Da Tang liudian book of Tang institutions states that a person who performed the task of fangxiangshi would put on "a mask with four golden eyes and wear a bear-skin outfit." The (1060) New Book of Tang notes that for Nuo rituals, "the lads should be between twelve and sixteen years old, masked, and arranged in four groups of six, and that, besides the whip-bearers, drummers and trumpeters, there should be two wu [shamans] in the procession. The exorcising song was to the very letter that of the Han dynasty."

=== Later periods ===
After the Tang dynasty, the official Chinese state religion discontinued performances of Nuo rituals led by professional fangxiangshi, and popular folk religion adapted them into local Nuo festivals.

During the Song dynasty (960-1279), the tradition of burying protective wood or pottery figures of fangxiangshi in tombs was changed into figures made of perishable straw or bamboo. The Tang-Song handbook on burial practices, the Bicanq jing, says the fangxiang figures were "woven in five colors, had four eyes and held tree branches in their hands". The official ritual of the Song dynasty said funerals for officers of the four highest ranks could have one fangsiang exorcist, and those below in rank could only have a qitou ghost mask. This text also records that in 970, Emperor Taizu of Song decreed that for funerals in the capital of Kaifeng, "it was forbidden to all families who had a burial to perform, to occupy themselves with Taoist and Buddhist observances, or to employ a van of men masked as strange men or animals."

Similarly, during Ming dynasty (1368-1644) funeral rituals were delimited to four-eyed fangxiang for officers of the 1st-4th ranks, two-eyed ones for officers of the 5th-7th ranks, and none for lower-ranking officers.

De Groot describes popular exorcising processions as "noisy, and even amusing, agreeably breaking the monotony of daily life" on the last day of the year, with boys wearing ghost-masks of old and young people and numerous gods and spirits, men dressed in costumes of fearsome door gods to scare away evil spirits, and male and female wu-shamans dancing with drums, all under the guidance of men and women acting as "fathers and mothers of the Nuo" ritual.

In the 1980s, the Chinese government officially recognized Nuo rituals as the folk religion of the Tujia people, who primarily live in the Wuling Mountains of Central China.

== Interpretations ==
Lisa Raphals suggests that the Zhou dynasty ritual fangxiangshi (方相氏) may have been a predecessor of the Han dynasty professional fangshi (方士; "recipe masters").

Bodde identifies the fangxiangshi with the demonic "God of War" Chiyou, who, according to legend, opposed the Yellow Emperor, citing Zhang Heng's (2nd century CE) Xijing fu poem that describes Chiyou similarly with how other texts portray the appearance and behavior of the fangxiangshi.

== Japanese hōsōshi ==
During the Heian period (794-1185), the Japanese adopted many Tang dynasty (618-907) Chinese customs, including the fangxiangshi known as hōsōshi 方相氏 who would lead a funeral procession and exorcise demons from a burial mound. This practice was amalgamated with traditional Japanese exorcism customs such as the Shinto ofuda "talisman with the name of a kami".

The earliest record was the (c. 797) Shoku Nihongi history, which mentions a hōsōshi exorcist officiating at the burial ceremonies for Emperor Shōmu (756), Emperor Kōnin (781), and Emperor Kanmu (806).

The Kyōgen actor Nomura Mannojō noted that Chinese Nuo rituals 儺 were the 8th-century source for the Japanese tsuina 追儺 or setsubun "ritual to exorcise evil spirits on the last day of winter", and proposed that supernatural power links the Chinese nuo performer fangxiangshi and the Japanese gigaku masked character Chidō 治道 "govern the way" who leads a.

In Japanese tradition and art, the hōsōshi wears a four-eyed mask rather than the original four-eyed bearskin.

== See also ==
- Fangshi
- Chinese ritual mastery traditions
