= Nuo folk religion =

Indigenous Chinese religion

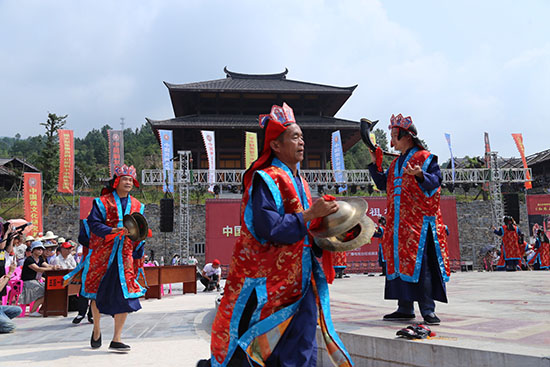
Nuo priests performing a ritual at the Chiyou Nuo Temple in Xinhua, Loudi, Hunan.

Nuo folk religion, or extendedly, Chinese popular exorcistic religion, is a variant of Chinese folk religion with its own system of temples, rituals, orders of priests, and gods that is interethnic and practiced across central and southern China but is also intimately connected to the Tujia people. It arose as an exorcistic religious movement, which is the original meaning of nuó (traditional Chinese: 儺; simplified Chinese: 傩). It has strong influences from Taoism.

One of the most distinguishing characteristics of Nuo folk religion is its iconographic style, which represents the gods as wooden masks or heads. This is related to its own mythology, which traces the origin of Nuo to the first two humans, who were unjustly killed by beheading and have since then been worshipped as responsive divine ancestors. Nuo rituals began as efficacious methods to worship them, Lord Nuo and Lady Nuo. Since the 1980s, Nuo folk religion has undergone a revitalisation in China, and today is a folk religion endorsed by the central government. Nuo priests are classified as 巫 wu (shamans) and their historical precursors were the 方相氏 fangxiangshi .

== Deities ==
=== Ancestral couple: Nuogong and Nuopo ===
The highest deities in the Nuo pantheon are Lord Nuo (傩公 Nuógōng) and Lady Nuo (Nuópó 傩婆), the two ancestors of humanity, according to mythology, whose sacrifice gave origin to Nuo practices. When a Nuo ceremony is performed, the ancestral couple is represented by carved wooden statues erected in front of the temple, while all lesser gods are placed behind them. In simpler rituals, they are seen as embodiments of all the other gods.

=== Three Purities and the Jade Deity ===
Generally, right below the ancestral couple of Nuogong and Nuopo come the Three Pure Ones (三清 Sānqīng). These are the main trinity of Taoist theology, and were introduced among the Tujia by Han Chinese who moved to their areas. Apart from the trinity and some elaborate ritual styles, Nuo folk religion has not acquired the philosophical contents of Taoism, as the purpose of Nuo practices is mainly to "nourish" Nuo gods. Directly below the Three Pure Ones is the Jade Deity (玉帝 Yùdì), another deity from Taoist theology, who is invoked by Nuo priests by blowing into a peculiar ritual instrument, an ox horn. The Jade Deity is conceived as the commander of all lesser gods, so in order to communicate with them it is necessary to call upon him first.

=== Three Worlds' Deities, Five Directions' Deities, and the Enthroned Deity ===
Below the Jade Deity come the Three Patrons and Five Deities (Chinese: 三皇五方帝, romanized: Sānhuáng-Wǔfāngdì), both of which are common in Han Chinese folk religion. The triplet is formed by the patron of Heaven (天皇 Tiānhuáng, who is Fuxi), the patron of Earth (地皇 Dehuáng, who is Nüwa) and the patron of Humanity (人皇 Rénhuáng, who is Shennong).

The other group comprises the Yellow Deity at the centre of the cosmos, the Green or Blue Deity in the east, the Red Deity in the south, the White Deity in the west, and the Black Deity in the north. These have cosmological significance across various aspects of nature and are believed to have been embodied in historical personages.

Below the Three Patrons and the Five Deities is the Enthroned Deity, who is considered to be incarnated in the present time. The most prominent contemporary government figure of China is believed to be the Enthroned God. In Nuo shrines, there is often a tablet with the inscription "a long life to the god on the throne".

== Temples and ceremonies ==
The setting of Nuo activities are distinct temples (傩庙 nuómiào, "exorcism temple") and private altars (傩坛 nuótán). The main task of Nuo practices is to strengthen the power of gods as much as possible so that they can exorcise malevolent beings.

Nuo ceremonies (傩仪 nuó yí) can involve dance performance (傩舞 nuó wǔ), songs (傩歌 nuó gē), sacrifices (傩祭 nuó jì), and the Nuo theatre (傩戏 nuóxì).

Every order of Nuo priests has its own founders, who are honoured at dedicated altars (师坛 shītán, "order's altar"). The ancestors of the order are invoked during every ritual performance and in the divine hierarchy, they come right below the Enthroned Deity. The three earliest Nuo ritualists common to nearly all the orders are Yan Sanlang, Liu Wulang, and Huang Wanlang.

There are also a variety of gods of nature and of human affairs, such as the Door Gods, the Well God, the Hearth God, the Land God, and the Wealth God, which are those with an immediate relationship with people despite their lower rank in the Nuo pantheon.

== Cosmology ==
Nuo cosmology is based on a yin and yang theory, clearly represented in mythology, otherwise explainable as a world in which potentiality and actuality, supernature and nature, form a complementary and dialectical duality which is the order of the universe. Man is an active participant within this order, interplaying with the world of divinity in a creative manner. Nuo mythology also tells of a highest goddess, Tiānxiān (天仙 "Heavenly Immortal"), who is directly involved since the origin of humanity in triggering this dialogue between the spiritual and the material. The primary form of dialogue is the worship of ancestors, and this is reflected in the patriarchal structure of Tujia society.

== Influence on nearby traditions ==
=== Japanese Shinto rituals with Nuo origins ===
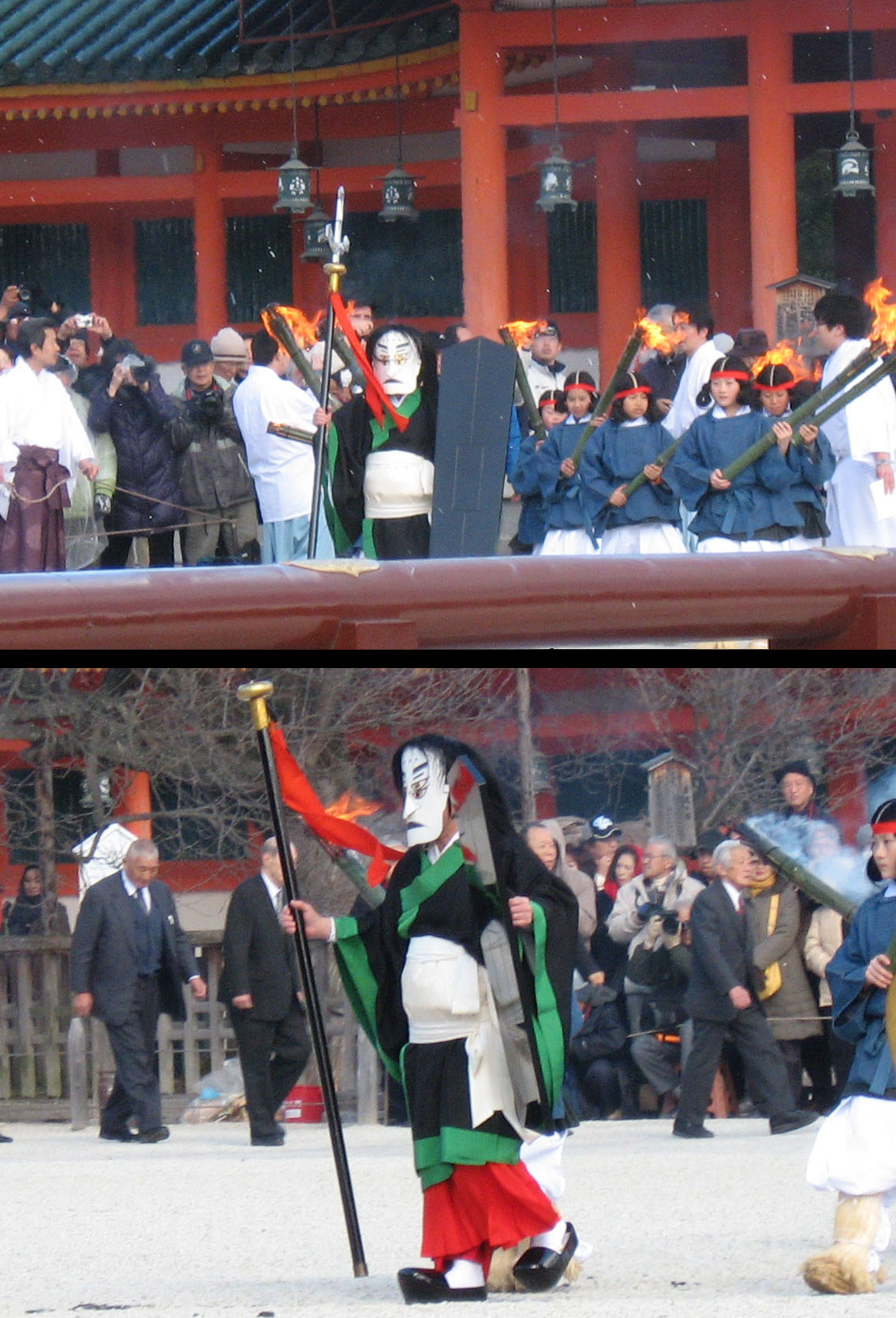
Japanese Shinto ceremonial hōsōshi at Heian Shrine (2010).

Heian Japan (794–1185) adopted many Tang Chinese (618–907) customs, including fangxiangshi, the precursor to Nuo priests, Japanese hōsōshi (方相氏). These would lead funeral processions and exorcise demons from kofun and, later, mausolea. This practice was merged with traditional exorcistic rites such as the ofuda ("talisman with the name of a kami").

The earliest record was the (c. 797) Shoku Nihongi history, which mentions a hōsōshi officiating at the burial ceremonies for Emperor Shōmu (756), Emperor Kōnin (781), and Emperor Kanmu (806).

The Kyōgen actor Nomura Mannojō noted that Chinese nuo 儺 practices were the 8th-century source for the tsuina 追儺 or setsubun ("ritual to exorcise evil spirits on the last day of winter"), and proposed that supernatural power links the fangxiangshi and the Japanese gigaku masked character Chidō 治道 ("govern the way"), who leads a ceremony. In Japanese tradition and art, the hōsōshi wears a four-eyed mask rather than the original four-eyed bearskin.

=== Korean traditions ===
The royal traditions of the Nuo folk religion in Korea were introduced in the 6th year of the reign of Jeongjong of Goryeo. According to Book 64 of Goryeosa, a person between the ages of 12 and 16 was selected in December as a person who can exorcise evil called Jinja, which wore a red attire that was worn over the pants. 24 of these selected people formed a group and 6 people formed one row. Normally, the team is constituted of 2 groups. 12 people who led this team of exorcists wore a red hat and special clothing called sochang and had a whip. To fit the occasion of exorcism, Cheoyongmu was also performed in court. The tradition waned in performance after the late Joseon period.

== See also ==
- Chinese folk religion
- Chinese ritual mastery traditions
- Chinese shamanism
- Fangxiangshi
- Nuo opera
- Taoism
