= Taoism in Japan =

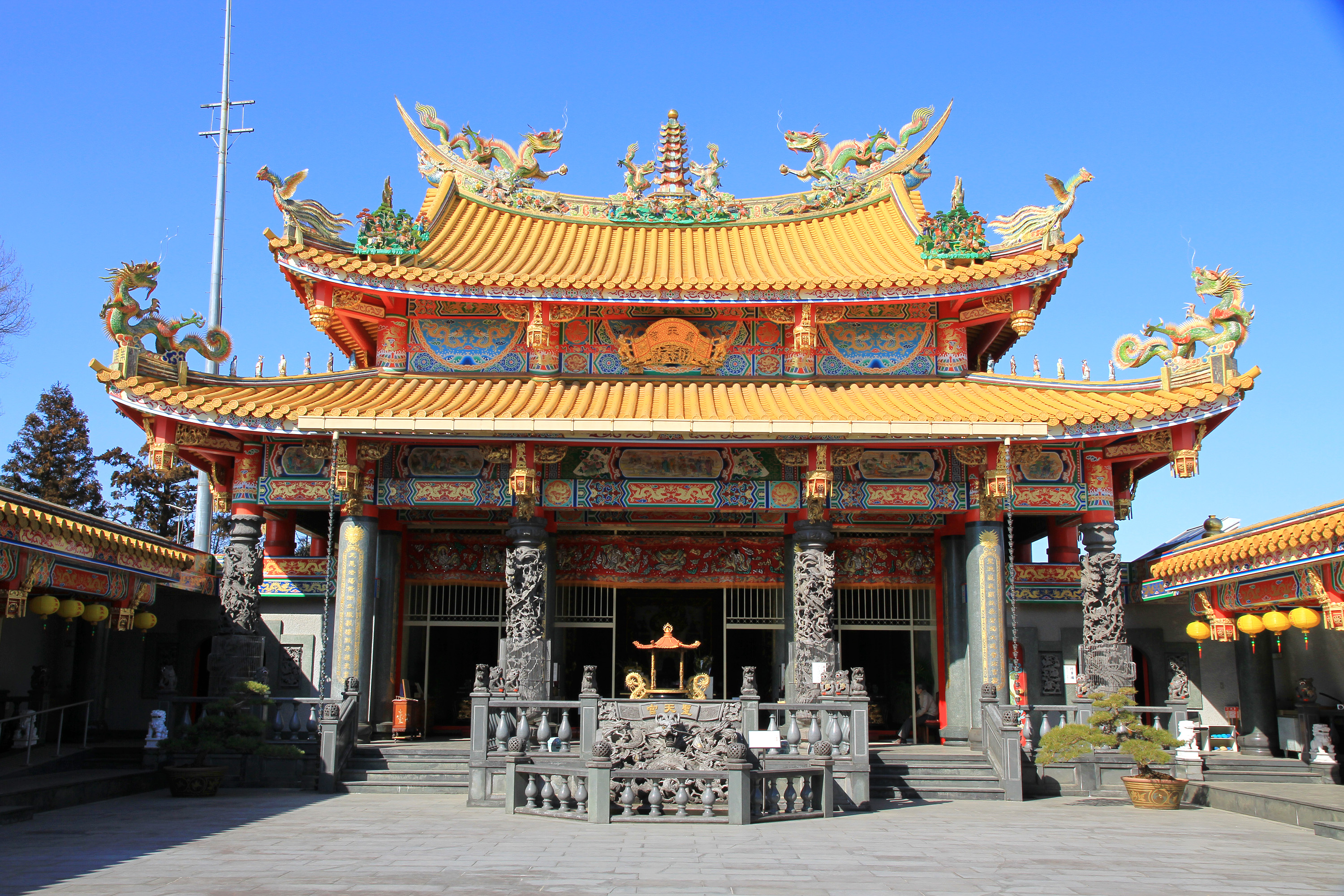
Seitenkyū, a Taoist temple in Sakado, Saitama.

Taoism is believed to be the inspiration for some spiritual concepts in Japanese culture. Taoism's influence can be seen throughout the culture but to a lesser extent than Confucianism.

Taoism in the form it takes in Japan can be easily seen as superstitious or astrological and the concept of demons and spirits seem to have their roots in a Taoist influence such as Onmyōdō and Shugendō. The widely practiced ritual of setsubun (節分) where chanters repeat "Demons out! Luck in!" has its base in Taoism and also touches on a relation to uchi-soto. There is a culture of consultation where ogamiyasan are called upon to provide their Taoism based insight to bear upon events such as house-buildings. Taoism in Japan has a calendar whereby one can determine the best day to perform various functions.

Taoist fulu charms influenced ofuda in Shinto and Japanese Buddhism.

== Etymology ==
The Japanese kanji for Taoism is 道教 (Dô-kyô). The root of this kanji is 道 (michi, way, path) + 教 (kyō, doctrine, teaching, education). Dô shares the same Chinese character as tao, 道 which literally means "way".

== Taoism in Japan ==
In general, Japanese traditional culture has only adopted Taoist ritual from China, abhorring Taoist thought.

According to a tale from the Nihon Shoki, a man named Tajimamori set out to explore for the elixir of immortality and reached the Eternal Land, where he brought back the “fragrant fruit” to offer to his ruler; the latter turned out to be already dead so Tajimamori followed suit. “Scholars have identified it as the immortals’ isles of Penglai, and the ‘fragrant fruit’ as the mandarin orange".

The legal system of China was brought to Japan in the late 7th and early 8th centuries, specifically a Bureau of yin and yang, the Ommyokan, to handle affairs of time keeping, astronomy, dream interpretation and calendar calculation and yin-yang and the Five Phases cosmology. By the 10th century, it developed with rituals to cast away unlucky tendencies and this became known as the religious practice in Japan called inyodo (Onmyōdō) or yin-yang divination.

Taoism also influenced Shugendo, Japan’s shamanistic and mountain worship. It began in the 7th century and combined Buddhism, yin-yang divination, Shinto and Taoist elements. One spell of Taoistic influence is the “Come down, soldiers and fighters, and line up before me!” which is used to enter a holy mountain on certain days. Another ritual formula evident of Taoism is the “Swiftly, swiftly, in accordance with the statutes and ordinances!” which can be seen in banners, talismans and roof tiles even today in Japan.

Taoist influences made their way even to Shinto, specifically Ise and Yoshida Shintō, both of which developed in Kamakura in 1281. Shinto became one of Japan’s political doctrines in the early 20th century, known as the State Shinto. In 1950, the Society for the Research of Daoism was founded. In 1951, the Society published its first journal.

One of the Taoist practices in Japan is the Kōshin religion. Koshin refers to the 57th day of the 60-day calendar cycle, where three worms bringing death from the human body go to report of people’s sins in heaven. The worms then go back to the human body and shorten the people’s lifespan by causing illnesses and unhappiness. To avoid this, the Taoists stays awake the whole day and night and perform rituals. “The Koshin cult is the most obvious and best known instance of Taoism in Japan”.

== See also ==
- Kuji-in
- Fulu
