= Setsubun =

Japanese holiday celebrating spring held in the first week of February

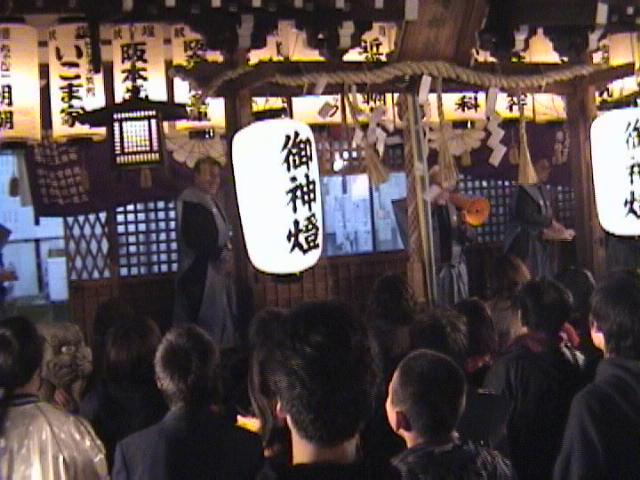
- Tokuan shrine
- Also called: Bean-throwing festival, Bean-throwing ceremony
- Observed by: Japanese people
- Type: Religious, cultural
- Significance: Day before the beginning of spring
- Date: Between 2 and 4 February
- 2027 date: Wednesday, 3 February
- Frequency: Annual
- Related to: Spring Festival (Harumatsuri)

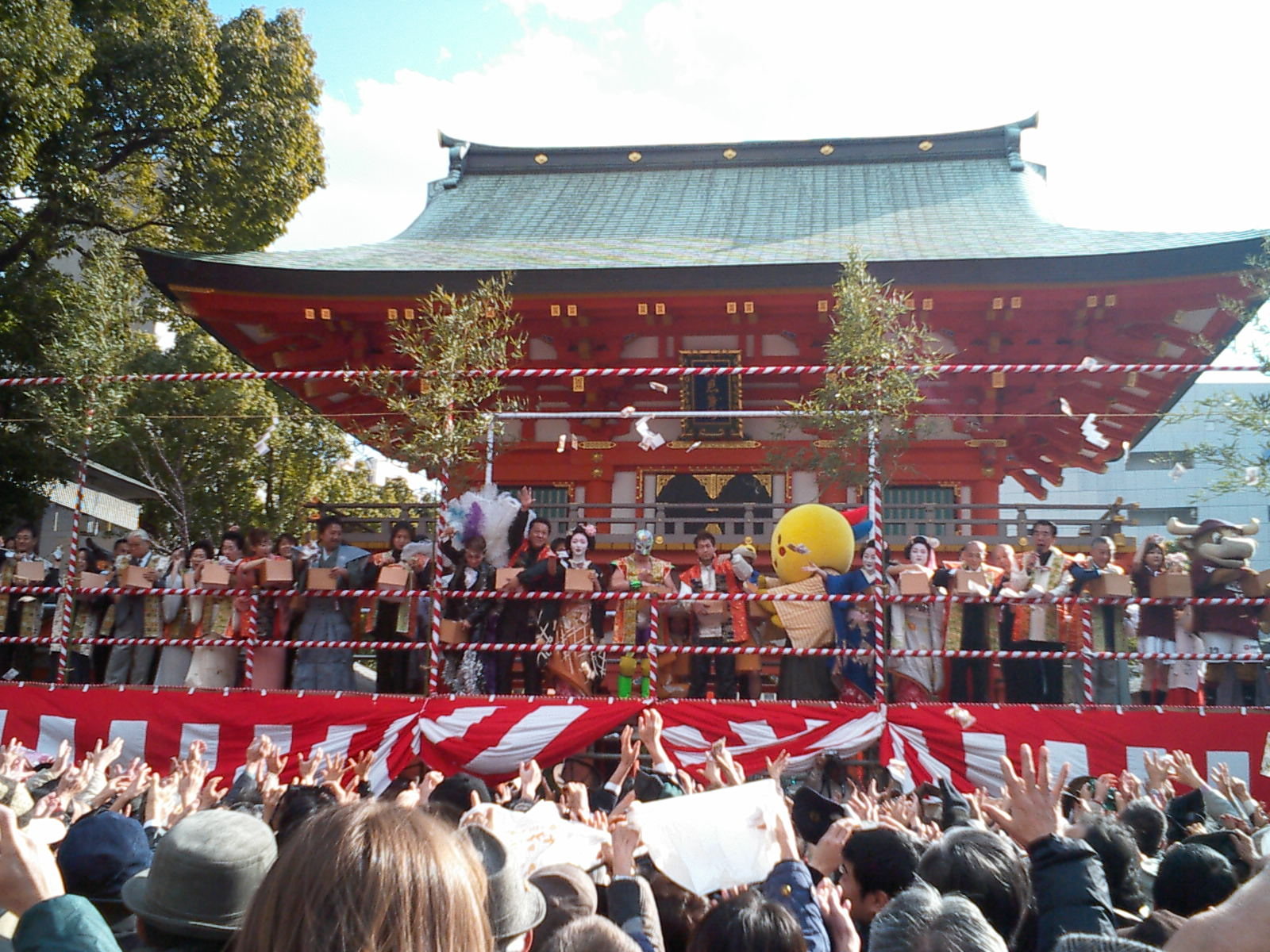
Celebrities throw roasted beans in Ikuta Shrine, Kobe

Mamemaki in Samukawa Shrine, Kanagawa

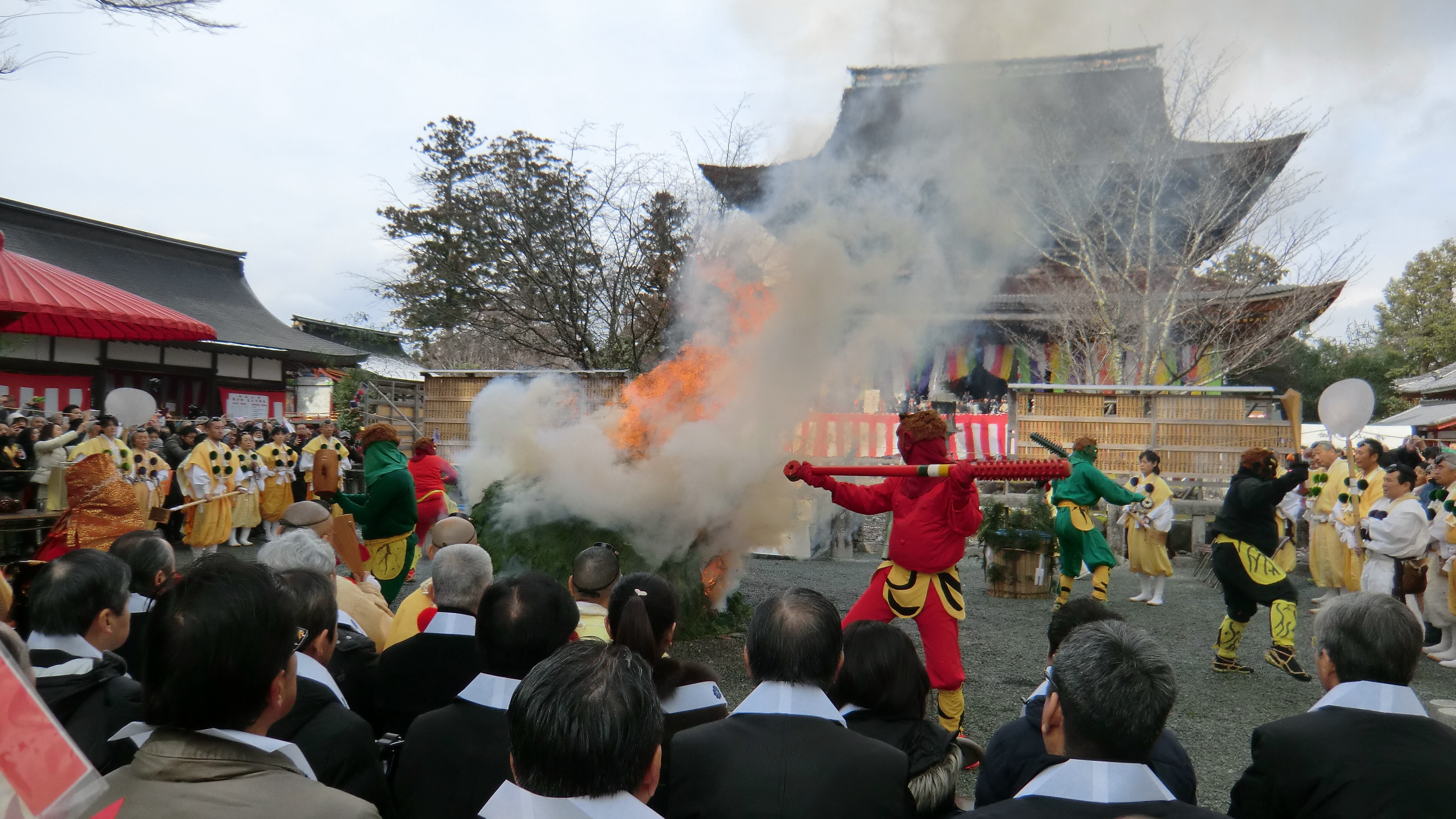
Kimpusen-ji

Setsubun (節分) is the day before the beginning of spring in the old calendar in Japan. The name literally means 'seasonal division', referring to the day just before the first day of spring in the traditional calendar, known as Setsubun; though previously referring to a wider range of possible dates, Setsubun is now typically held on February 3 (in 2021 and 2025 it was on 2 February), with the day after – the first day of spring in the old calendar – known as Risshun (立春). Both Setsubun and Risshun are celebrated yearly as part of the Spring Festival (Haru matsuri (春祭)) in Japan. Setsubun was accompanied by a number of rituals and traditions held at various levels to drive away the previous year's bad fortunes and evil spirits for the year to come.

== History ==
Setsubun has its origins in tsuina (追儺), a Chinese custom introduced to Japan in the 8th century. It was quite different from the Setsubun known today. According to the Japanese history book Shoku Nihongi, tsuina was first held in Japan in 706, and it was an event to ward off evil spirits held at the court on the last day of the year according to the lunar-solar calendar. At that time, tsuina was an event to drive away evil spirits that brought misfortune and disease by decorating each gate of the palace with clay figures of cows and children and using peach branches and walking sticks.

The custom of Setsubun as we know it today began in the Muromachi period (1336–1573). Every household of the aristocracy and samurai class threw beans from their houses into the open air. The Ainōshō, a dictionary compiled during the Muromachi period, states that the practice of bean-throwing during Setsubun originated from a legend in the 10th century, during the reign of Emperor Uda, that a monk on Mt. Kurama escaped misfortune by blinding oni with roasted beans. The Japanese word for bean, 豆, is pronounced mame, which can be written as 'devil's eye' (魔目), and some believe that the pronunciation is similar to that of mametsu (魔滅), meaning 'to destroy the devil', which is why people began throwing beans during Setsubun. While the aristocracy maintained a distinction between tsuina, performed at the end of the year, and the bean-throwing rite of Setsubun, the two traditions became conflated among commoners.

From the Edo period (1603–1867), the custom of throwing beans at Shinto shrines, Buddhist temples, and homes of ordinary people spread throughout Japan as an event or festival to drive away evil spirits during Setsubun. It was also during this period that the custom of tying roasted sardine heads to holly sprig to decorate the gates of houses during Setsubun began. This custom was intended to scare away oni with the thorns of the holly leaves and the smell of the roasted sardines. The original form of this custom is recorded in the Tosa Nikki, compiled in 934 during the Heian period (794–1185). The diary describes a Shinto shimenawa (sacred rope) that was hung on the gate of a house during the New Year's holiday to mark the boundary of purification, and that a mullet head pierced with a sprig of holly was attached to the shimenawa.

The custom of eating ehōmaki (恵方巻) on Setsubun began in the geisha districts from the Edo period to the Meiji period. Ehōmaki is a special makizushi (sushi roll) eaten on Setsubun. On Setsubun, people face the most auspicious direction of the year and eat the whole ehōmaki, an uncut sushi roll, to pray for prosperity and happiness for the year. It is believed that it was originally called simply marukaburi zushi (丸かぶり寿司) or futomaki zushi (太巻き寿司). The name ehōmaki may have spread throughout Japan in 1989, when a Japanese convenience store chain renamed it ehōmaki and began selling it.

== Traditions ==
=== Mamemaki ===
The main ritual associated with the observance of Setsubun is mamemaki (豆撒き, 'bean scattering'); this ritual sees roasted soybeans (known as fukumame (福豆, 'fortune beans')) either thrown out of the front door, or at a member of the family wearing an oni (demon or ogre) mask while shouting 'Devils out! Fortune in!' (鬼は外! 福は内!, Oni wa soto! Fuku wa uchi!), before slamming the door. The beans are thought to symbolically purify the home by driving away the evil spirits that bring misfortune and bad health with them. Then, as part of bringing luck in, it is customary to eat roasted soybeans, one for each year of one's life (kazoedoshi), plus one more for bringing good luck for the year.

The custom of mamemaki first appeared in the Muromachi period, and is usually performed by either a man of the household born in the corresponding zodiac year for the new year (toshiotoko (年男)), or else the male head of the household.

Because Watanabe no Tsuna, a retainer of Minamoto no Yorimitsu during the Heian period (794–1185), is associated with the legend that he vanquished oni historically considered to be the strongest, such as Shuten-doji and Ibaraki-doji, there is a tradition that oni stay away from people named Watanabe and their houses. For this reason, some families with the surname Watanabe have not practiced the custom of throwing beans on Setsubun for generations. Watanabe no Tsuna was the first person to take the surname Watanabe, and Watanabe is the fifth most common surname in Japan, with approximately 1.08 million people as of 2017.

Though still a somewhat common practice in households, many people will also or instead attend a shrine or temple's spring festival, where the practice of mamemaki is performed; in some areas, such as Kyoto, this involves a dance performed by apprentice geisha, after which the apprentices themselves throw packets of roasted soybeans to the crowds. In other areas, priests and invited guests throw packets of roasted soybeans, some wrapped in gold or silver foil, small envelopes with money, sweets, candies and other prizes. In some bigger and more central shrines, celebrities and sumo wrestlers are invited to celebrations, usually to Setsubun events that are televised. At Sensō-ji in the Asakusa neighborhood of Tokyo, crowds of nearly 100,000 people attend the annual festivities.

=== Other practices ===
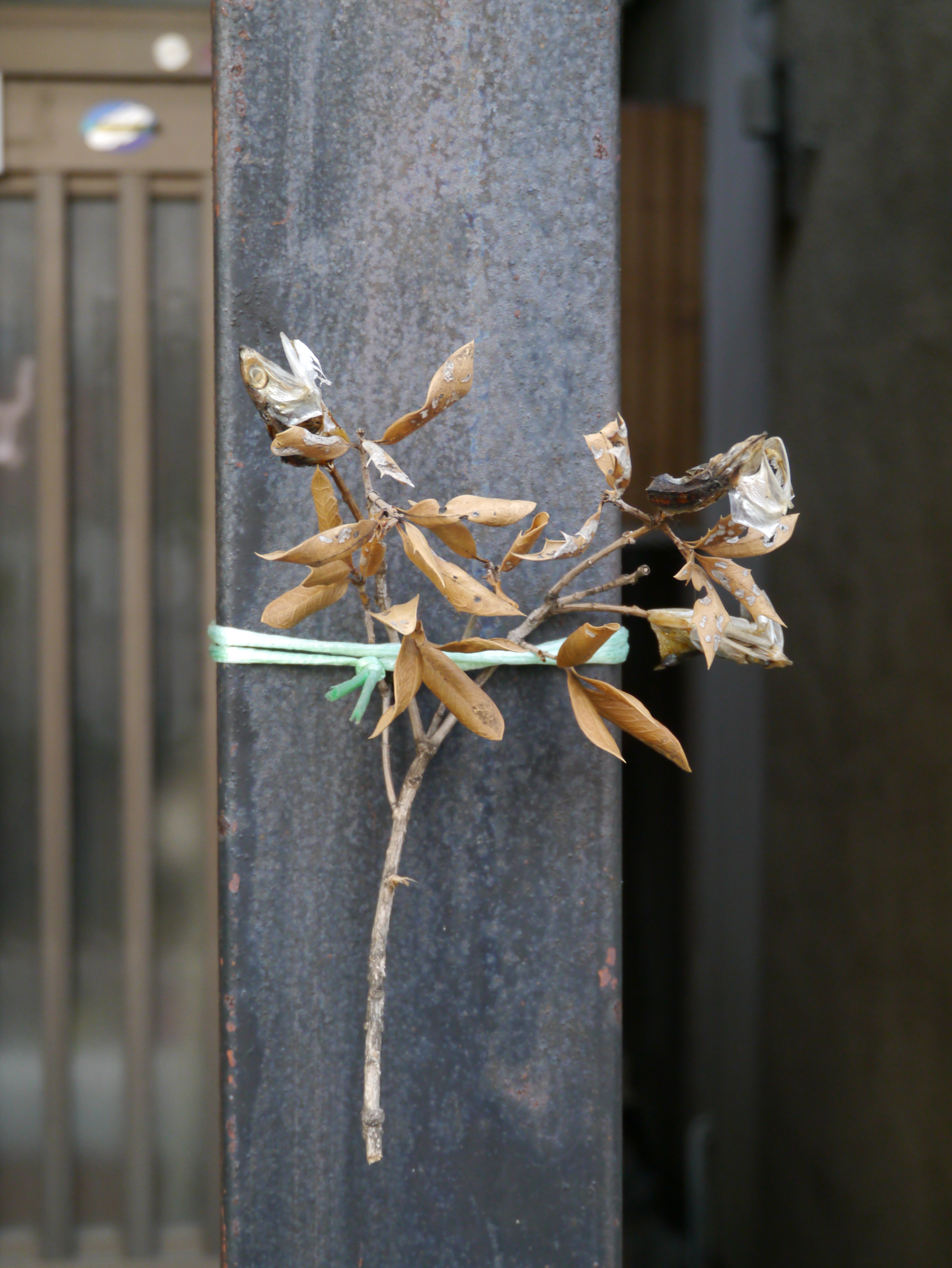
Sardine head talisman on house entrance to keep bad spirits away

A number of other, in some cases more esoteric practices exist surrounding the celebration and observance of Setsubun; some are regional, such as the Kansai area tradition of eating uncut makizushi rolls, known as ehō-maki (恵方巻, 'lucky direction roll'), in silence whilst facing the year's lucky compass direction as determined by the zodiac symbol of that year. Though the custom originated in Osaka, it has since spread, due largely to marketing efforts by grocery and convenience stores.

Other practices include the putting up of small decorations of sardine heads and holly leaves (柊鰯, hiiragi iwashi) at the entrance to a house to ward off evil spirits. A special variety of sake known as shōgazake (生姜酒) brewed with ginger is also customarily drunk on Setsubun. Each region of Japan has its own lucky charms to eat on Setsubun. Soybeans used for mamemaki and soba are the most common, but peanuts in the Hokkaido and Tōhoku region, kenchin-jiru and shimotsukare in the Kanto region, tea with kelp and sardines in Kansai region, konjac in Shikoku region, sea cucumber in the Oki Islands, and whale in the San'in region are also eaten.

== Historical practices ==
The new year was felt to be a time when the spirit world became close to the physical world, thus the need to perform mamemaki to drive away any wandering spirits that might happen too close to one's home. Other customs during this time included religious dances, festivals, and bringing tools inside the house that might normally be left outside, to prevent the spirits from harming them. Rice cakes were also balanced on lintels and windowsills.

Because Setsubun is considered to be a day set apart from the rest of the year, a tradition of role reversal in appearance and dress was also practiced; such customs included girls wearing the hairstyles of older women and vice versa, wearing disguises, and cross-dressing. This custom is still practiced among geisha and their clients when entertaining on Setsubun.

Traveling entertainers (旅芸人, tabi geinin), who were normally shunned during the year because they were considered vagrants, were welcomed on Setsubun to perform morality plays. Their vagrancy worked to their advantage in these cases, as they were considered to take evil spirits with them.

== Regional variations ==
In the Tōhoku area of Japan, the head of the household (traditionally the father) would take roasted beans in his hand, pray at the family shrine, and then toss the sanctified beans out the door. Peanuts (either raw or coated in a sweet, crunchy batter) are sometimes used in place of soybeans.

There are many variations on the famous "Oni wa soto, fuku wa uchi!" chant. For example, in the city of Aizuwakamatsu, people chant Oni no medama buttsubuse! (鬼の目玉ぶっつぶせ！, 'Blind the demons' eyes!')

== See also ==
- Ehōmaki, a sushi roll often eaten for good luck on Setsubun.
- Exorcism
- Feast of the Lemures (a similar Roman custom)
- Holidays of Japan
- Rikka (立夏)
- Risshū (立秋)
- Risshun (立春)
- Rittō (立冬)
- Saint John's Eve
- Taoism in Japan
- Walpurgis Night
- Zvončari (the custom dating to pagan times in Croatia whose goal is to scare away evil spirits of winter and to stir up new springtime cycle)
