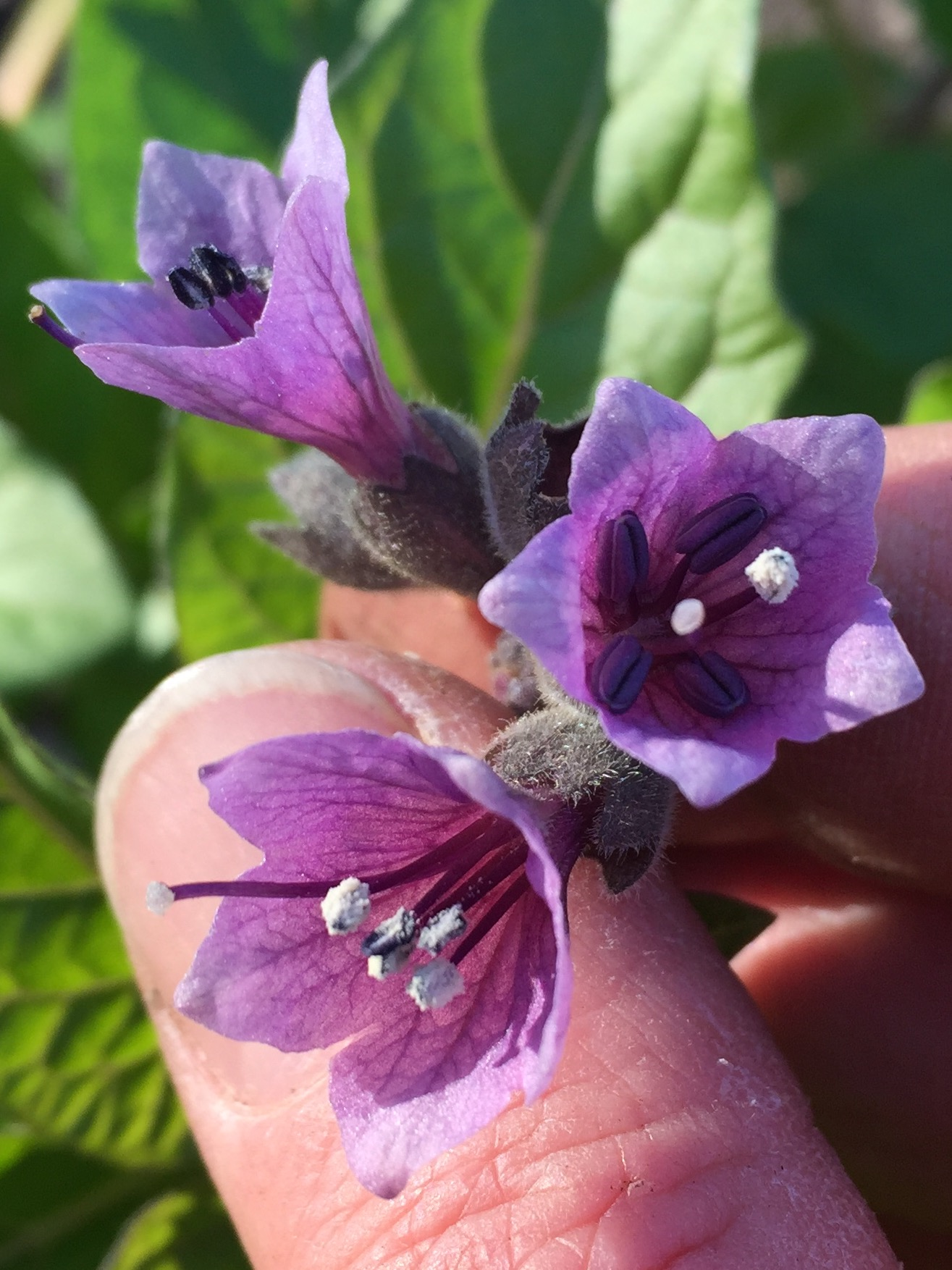
- Physochlaina orientalis

Scientific classification
- Kingdom: Plantae
- Clade: Tracheophytes
- Clade: Angiosperms
- Clade: Eudicots
- Clade: Asterids
- Order: Solanales
- Family: Solanaceae
- Subfamily: Solanoideae
- Tribe: Hyoscyameae
- Genus: Physochlaina; G.Don

Species
- 6–10, see text

= Physochlaina =

Genus of flowering plants in the nightshade family

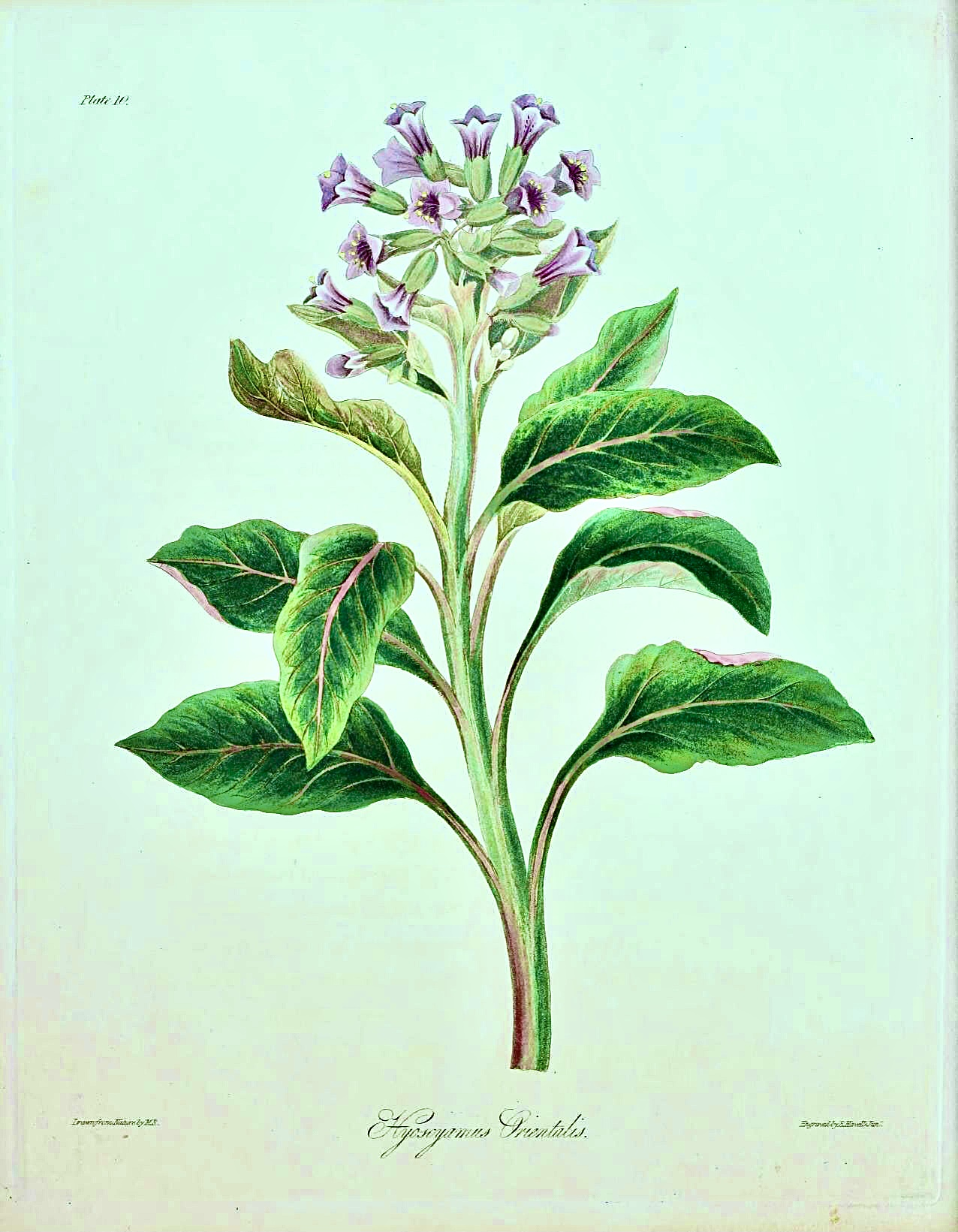
Coloured plate, 1831, of P. orientalis (as Hyoscyamus orientalis) by Margaret Roscoe

Physochlaina is a small genus of herbaceous perennial flowering plants belonging to the nightshade family, Solanaceae, found principally in the north-western provinces of China (and regions adjoining these in the Himalaya and Central Asia) although one species occurs in Western Asia, while others occur in Siberia, Mongolia and the Chinese autonomous region of Inner Mongolia. Some sources maintain that the widespread species P. physaloides is found also in Japan, but the species is not recorded as being native in one of the few English-language floras of the country. The genus has medicinal value, being rich in tropane alkaloids, and is also of ornamental value, three species having been grown for ornament, although hitherto infrequently outside botanical gardens. Furthermore, the genus contains a species (P. physaloides – recorded in older literature under the synonyms Hyoscyamus physalodes, Hyoscyamus physaloides and Scopolia physaloides) formerly used as an entheogen in Siberia (re. which see translation of Gmelin's account of such use below).

== Derivation of genus name ==
The name Physochlaina is a compound of the Greek words φυσα (phusa), 'bladder' / 'bubble' / 'inflated thing' and χλαινα (chlaina), 'robe' / 'loose outer garment' / 'cloak' / 'wrapper' – giving the meaning 'clad loosely in a puffed-up bladder' – in reference to the calyces of the plants, which become enlarged and sometimes bladder-like in fruit – like those of the much better known Solanaceous genera Physalis, Withania and Nicandra, from which they differ in enclosing, not berries, but box-like pyxidial capsules, like those of Hyoscyamus (see below). The variant spelling Physochlaena – as employed by Professor Eva Schönbeck-Temesy in her section on the Solanaceae for Flora Iranica – appears first on page 737 of Volume 22 of the German-language journal Linnaea for the year 1849.

== Publication of genus name ==
The genus name Physochlaina was first published in 1838 by Scottish botanist George Don (great-uncle of Monty Don) on page 470 of volume IV of his four-volume work A General System of Gardening and Botany, often referred to as Gen. Hist. (an abbreviation of the alternative title A General History of the Dichlamydeous Plants) and written between 1832 and 1838. He included in his new genus the two species hitherto known as Hyoscyamus physaloides L. and Hyoscyamus orientalis M. Bieb. – the latter published by Baron Friedrich August Marschall von Bieberstein in his Flora taurico-caucasica of 1808.

== Common names ==
Not being native to Western Europe, plants belonging to the genus Physochlaina have no common name of any antiquity in English, nor have they acquired a more recent common name among English-speaking gardeners, despite the passage of two centuries since their introduction to cultivation in the U.K.

Robert Sweet coined the English name Oriental Henbane for P. orientalis in his work The British Flower Garden in 1823, but this is simply a translation of the (now obsolete) name Hyoscyamus orientalis. He further coins the name Purple-flowered Henbane for the Siberian species P. physaloides, but this adds to the confusion, as, not only is the species in question no longer classified as a Henbane (i.e. Hyoscyamus), but there are also a number of (true) Hyoscyamus spp. which bear purple flowers – e.g. Hyoscyamus muticus.

There is, however, a common name (age unknown) for Physochlaina in Russian, namely Пузырница (Puzeernitsa) – 'bladder / bubble plant', qualified Пузырница Физалисовая (Puzeernitsa Phizalisovaya) – Physalis-like Bladder plant in the case of P. physaloides . The Swedish common name for the genus – Vårbolmört – translates as 'Spring(-flowering) Henbane', while the Finnish common name Kievarinyrtti means 'Inn Herb' and the Estonian common name is Ida-vullrohu, meaning 'Eastern Henbane'.

In Turkey, where the species Physochlaina orientalis is native to the region abutting the easternmost stretch of Turkey's Black Sea coast, the common name given to the plant is Taş Banotu, meaning Stone Henbane i.e. "the henbane that grows on/out of, stone" in reference to the plant's ability to thrive in rock crevices [see section below on P. orientalis with accompanying image of wild specimen growing in crevices in volcanic rock]. The late Professor Turhan Baytop lists the Turkish common name Yalancı Banotu (= "False Henbane") for the plant in his 1963 work on the medicinal and poisonous plants of Turkey. He does not, however, record any information concerning any medicinal properties attributed to Physochlaina orientalis or folk medicinal uses of it made in Turkey. While Baytop includes a brief mention of the plant in the section "List of the Medicinal and Poisonous Plants of Turkey" under the family heading "Solanaceae", he does not include it in the section which constitutes the bulk of his work - namely "Principal Medicinal Plants of Turkey" - this in marked contrast to his substantial treatment of the related genus Hyoscyamus. The list entry for P. orientalis reads simply " * Physoclaina [sic.] orientalis (M.B.) G.Don. - Yalancı Banotu: Gümüşhane" - the initial asterisk here indicating a plant not only medicinal but actively poisonous, and "Gümüşhane" the province of Turkey in which the plant is to be found.

In the ancient, Iranian language Ossetian, spoken both to the North and the South of the Greater Caucasus range, plants of the genus Physochlaina have the common name Тыппыргæрдæг – approximate pronunciation Typpyrgərdəg (where schwa stands for the unique Ossetian vowel for which the special letter 'æ' had to be created in the Cyrillic alphabet). (See also page Physochlaina in Wikipedia, language: Ирон). The name Тыппыргæрдæг is composed of the Ossetian elements тыппыр (typpyr) 'swollen' / 'puffed up' and кæрдаг / гæрдаг ((approx.) kerdag / gerdag) 'grass' / 'herb' (and also - confusingly - 'fungus' / 'mushroom'), thus yielding an English translation of bladder-grass (cf. Ossetian таппуз (tappuz) 'bladder' / 'bubble'). This Ossetian common name for the plant is thus very similar in meaning to the Russian Puzeernitsa, but it is not clear whether it arose independently or is simply a translation of the Russian name for the plant. This said, Abaev lists a second meaning (prevalent particularly in the Digor dialect) of the Ossetian word typpyr, namely 'kurgan' (burial mound), in which the primary sense of 'swelling' is applied specifically to a swelling in the landscape i.e. a tumulus or small artificial hill. It is thus possible that the compound Typpyrgerdeg is translateable as grave-grass i.e. a herb associated in some way with grave mounds. Such a meaning for this compound would be compatible with a native Ossetian provenance - not unlikely in regard to the name of a plant native to the Caucasus (see below re. P. orientalis).

There are likewise several common names for the Himalayan Physochlaina praealta in the various languages of Nepal, and common names for the genus Physochlaina and the various Physochlaina species of Eastern Asiatic provenance in Standard Chinese (泡囊草属 pao nang ts'ao shu), Tibetan (khyn khors), Kazakh (үрмежеміс = (approximately) urmezhemis), Uzbek (xiyoli), Uyghur, Mongolian (garag chig tav) and certain Tungusic languages.

== Accepted species ==
The Plant List, a joint project of Royal Botanic Gardens, Kew and the Missouri Botanical Garden, accepts only six species of the genus:

- Physochlaina capitata A.M. Lu (common name in Chinese: 伊犁泡囊草 yi li pao nang cao i.e. "Physochlaina of the Ili River region"): Xinjiang: Ili River valley region, encompassing Borohoro Mountains and S.W. Tian Shan: Ili Kazakh Autonomous Prefecture (principal settlement Yining City): Xinyuan County (known as Künes pre-1946) and Gongliu County, growing on grassy slopes and in rock crevices. Corolla: yellow with purple throat or pale purple veined with deeper purple. Flowering time April to May and fruiting from May to June.
- Physochlaina infundibularis Kuang: Southeastern and North-Central China: South and West Henan, Qin Mountains of Shaanxi and South Shanxi, growing in valleys and forests at altitude of 800–1,600 m (2,600–5,200 ft). Corolla: greenish-yellow, pale purplish at base or yellowish-purple. Flowering time: March to May and fruiting from May to June. It has also been reported as native to Primorskiy Krai.
- Physochlaina macrocalyx Pascher (common name in Chinese 长萼泡囊草 chang e pao nang cao): Tibet. Little-known species. Corolla entirely yellow (no trace of violet). Not yet observed in fruit. Only description available the original brief one by Adolf Pascher, publisher of species name.
- Physochlaina macrophylla Bonati: South-Central China: W. Sichuan, growing in forests at altitude of 1900-2400m. Corolla purple. Flowering time: June to July and fruiting from July to August.
- Physochlaina physaloides (L.) G.Don: China: Hebei, Heilongjiang, Inner Mongolia and Xinjiang. Also Kazakhstan, Mongolia and S. Siberia. Grows on grassy slopes and forest margins at around 1,000 m (3,300 ft). Corolla purple. Flowering from April to May and fruiting from May to July.
- Physochlaina praealta (Decne.) Miers: Western Himalaya, N. India, N. Pakistan, Nepal and Tibet, growing on slopes at altitude of 4,200–4,500 m (13,800–14,800 ft). Corolla yellow with purple or greenish veins. Flowering from June to July and fruiting from July to August.

The others being rejected mostly as synonyms. Royal Botanic Gardens Kew Science Plants of the World online, however, accepts also:

- Physochlaina alaica Korotkova ex Kovalevsk: Tajikistan, Kyrgyzstan and Uzbekistan.
- Physochlaina albiflora Grubov: Mongolia
- Physochlaina orientalis (M.Bieb.) G.Don: 'Balkan States' (according to Flora of USSR), Armenia and E. Turkey, Transcaucasia, Iran and W. Central Asia
- Physochlaina semenowii Regel: Meeting point of Xinjiang province of China and easternmost Kazakhstan i.e. Dzungaria – notably the Tarbagatay Mountains (= ' Tarbagan marmot Mountains'), the Dzungarian Alatau ('Trans-Ilian Alatau' – Semenova) and the Tian Shan (including the Borohoro Mountains). Also Kyrgyzstan. Grows in mountains and mountain river valleys. Corolla small (1 cm) tubular and violet. Flowering from May to June.

== Description ==
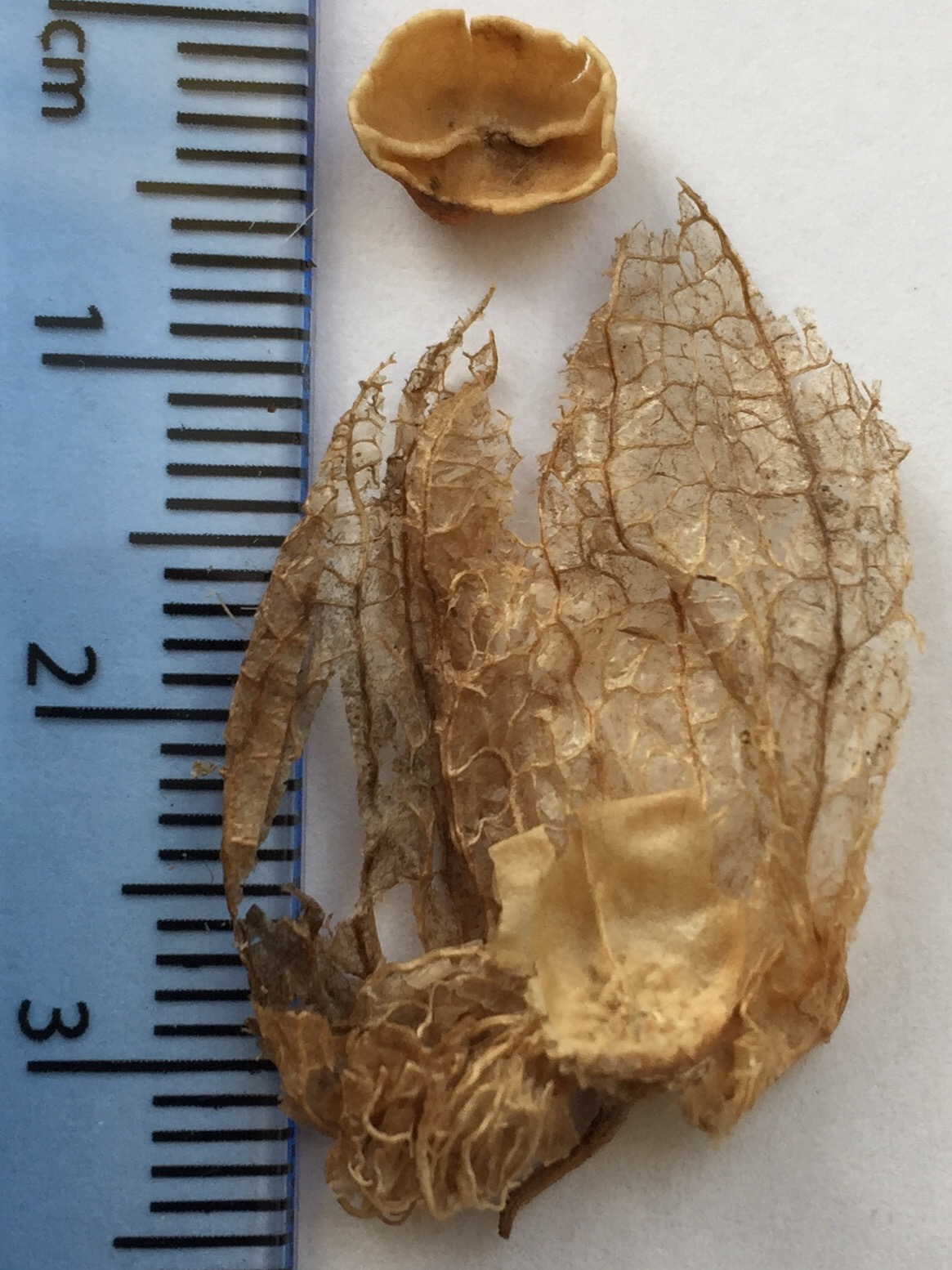
Bisected fruiting calyx and separate operculum of Physochlaina physaloides

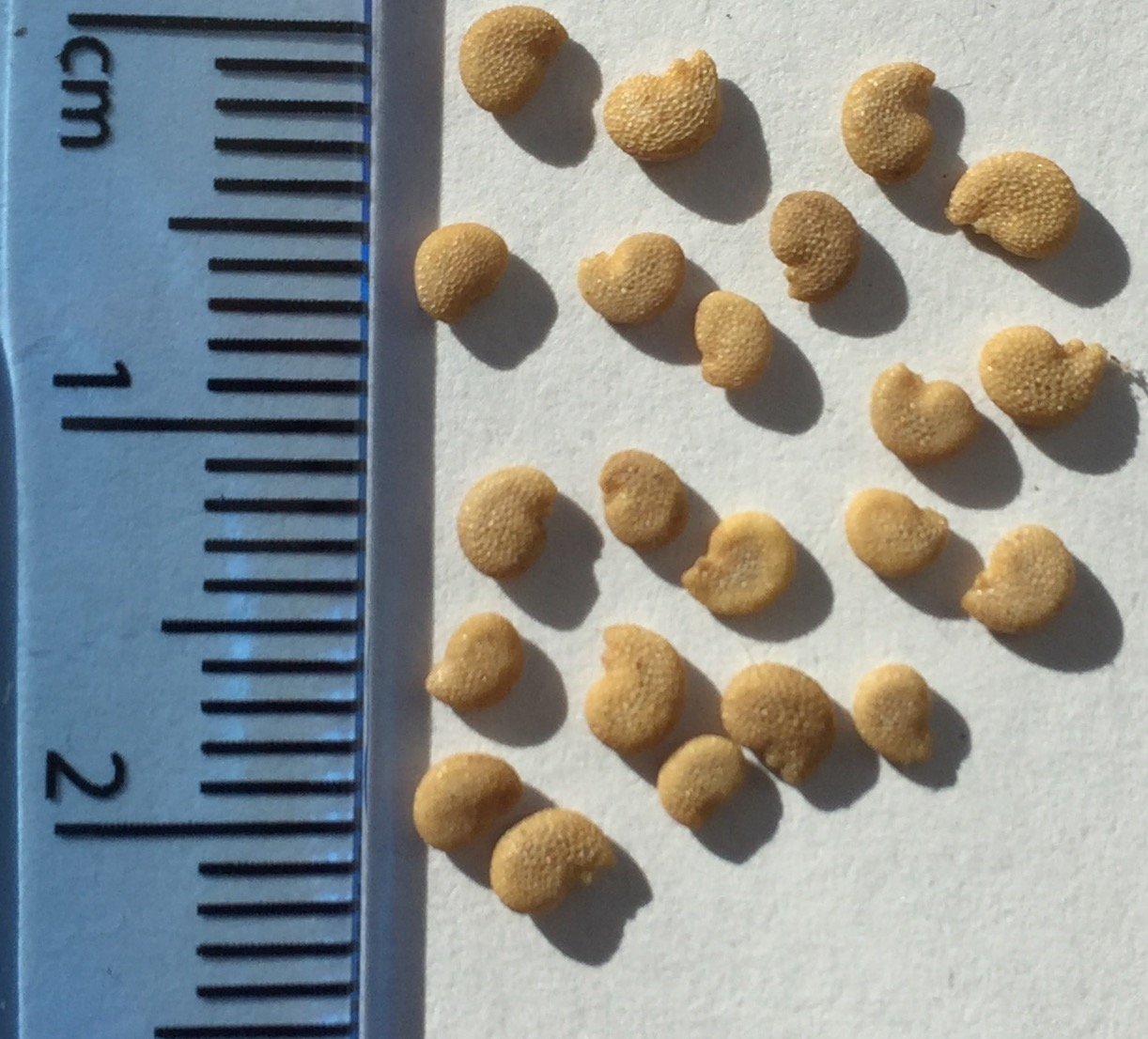
The yellowish-buff, pitted, reniform seeds of a Physochlaina species – probably P. physaloides, gathered in the Altai Mountains near the Mongolian city of Khovd in August 1989

Perennial herbs, differing in their type of inflorescence – a terminal, cymose panicle or corymbose raceme – from the other five genera of subtribe Hyoscyaminae within tribe Hyoscyameae of the Solanaceae. Flowers pedunculate (not secund, sessile/subsessile as in Hyoscyamus). Calyx lobes subequal or unequal; corolla campanulate (bell-shaped) or infundibuliform (funnel-shaped), lobes subequal or sometimes unequal, imbricate in bud; stamens inserted at the middle of corolla tube; disk conspicuous; fruiting calyx lobes nonspinescent apically (i.e. lacking the spiny points characteristic of the calyces of the related genus Hyoscyamus – the Henbanes), fruiting calyx inflated, bladder-like or campanulate, loosely enclosing the capsular fruit. Fruit a pyxidium (i.e. dry capsule opening by a distinct operculum (= lid) – as in the other five genera of the Hyoscyaminae). Pollen grain polymorphic, usually subspheroidal, oval in polar view, circular-triangular in equatorial view.

== Horticultural merit as ornamental ==
A gifted botanist blessed also with a gardener's eye for beauty, George Don was enthusiastic in his praise for the two plant species for which he created the new genus Physochlaina, noting in his 'A General History... ' of 1838:

The species of Physochlaina are extremely desirable plants; being early flowerers, and elegant when in blossom. They will grow in any soil, and are readily propagated by divisions of the root, or by seed. They are well adapted for decorating borders in early spring.

In regard to the soil type favoured by wild populations, volume 22 of Linnaea (in surprisingly geological vein) provides the observation that Physochlaina orientalis is to be found growing on soils underlain by trachytes (volcanic rocks of a type notably rich in the chemical element potassium, a plant macronutrient essential for the production of flowers and fruit and, in a specifically Solanaceous context, the main ingredient of liquid feed for tomato plants).

== Use in traditional Chinese medicine ==
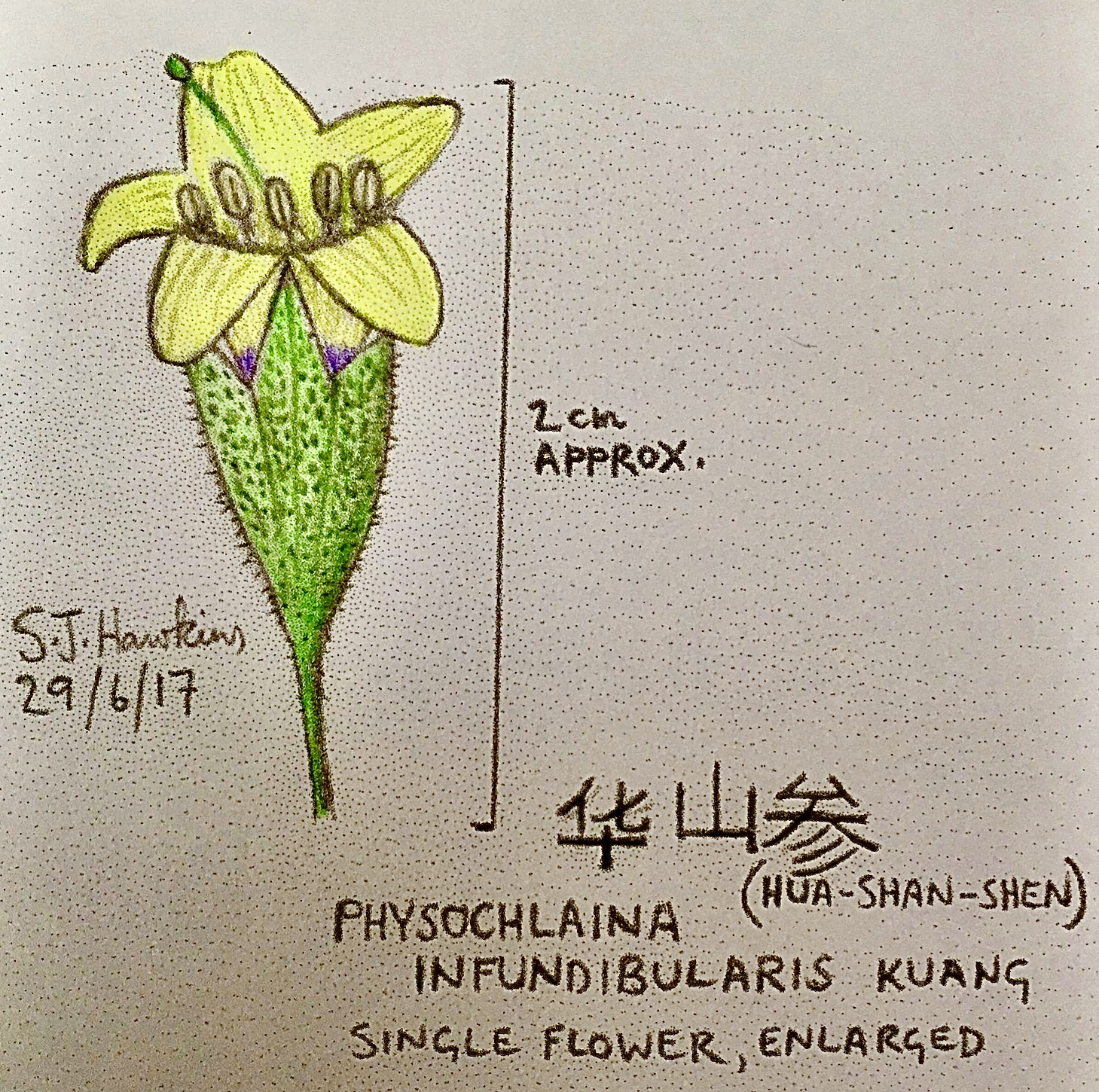
Single flower of Physochlaina infundibularis Kuang – the 'hot ginseng' of Mount Hua, Shaanxi province

At least three species of Physochlaina are currently used in traditional Chinese medicine: P. infundibularis, P. physaloides and P. praealta.

=== Physochlaina infundibularis ===
漏斗泡囊草 Lou-dou Pao-nang-ts'ao / lou dou pao nang cao (= 'Funnel-shaped Physochlaina '). The inhabitants of the neighbouring provinces of Shaanxi (rendered formerly 'Shensi') and Henan hold P. infundibularis in high esteem as a medicinal plant, regarding it as a kind of ginseng: most unusually for a toxic Solanaceous plant (totally unrelated botanically to the Araliaceous ginseng genus Panax) it is considered to be a 'general tonic' (= adaptogen). The Chinese element 参 shen (= ginseng) forms a part of two of the common names for the plant, namely 华山参 Hua-shan-shen (= ginseng of Mount Hua) and Je-shen (= hot ginseng – from its hot, sweet, slightly bitter and astringent taste).

As with Panax, it is the fleshy root of Physochlaina infundibularis that forms the drug: the fresh, raw roots are first peeled and then boiled in a sugar solution containing small quantities of three other herbal drugs, before being dried, ready for storage and use. The three drugs added to the boiling solution are the root of Glycyrrhiza uralensis, the rhizome of Ophiopogon japonicus and the fruits of Gardenia jasminoides. This peeling, boiling and addition of 'cooling', 'yin' drugs is undertaken to mitigate the 'heat' / toxicity of the Physochlaina infundibularis roots.

In addition to its use as an adaptogen, P. infundibularis is used (in traditional Chinese medicine) in the treatment of asthma, chronic bronchitis, abdominal pain, palpitations and insomnia and as a sedative. The drug is also used to treat diarrhea of the kind considered in traditional Chinese medicine to be 'diarrhea due to deficiency of vital energy with symptoms of cold'.

The nomenclatural association of P. infundibularis with Mount Hua – 'West Great Mountain' of the Five Great Mountains of China of Taoism – is an interesting one and merits further study: in common with other mountains regarded in China as numinous/Xian ling, Mount Hua (a precipitous assemblage of five (counted anciently only as three) peaks in the Qin range) is held to be a source of rare medicinal plants and life-prolonging elixirs. Furthermore, at the foot of the West Peak of Mount Hua (known as Lianhua Feng (蓮花峰) or Furong Feng (芙蓉峰), both meaning Lotus Flower Summit) stood, from as early as the second century BCE, a Taoist temple which was the site of shamanic practices undertaken by spirit mediums (see also Wu (shaman)) to contact an (unnamed) God of the Underworld and his minions, believed to dwell in the heart of the mountain.(See also Chinese folk religion). Tropane-containing, Solanaceous plants (such as Datura and Hyoscyamus spp.) have a long history of use as entheogens in shamanic practices – including Taoist practices- and indeed Physochlaina physaloides is known definitely to have been used as an entheogen by certain Tungus tribes (see section below), so the possible use of its sister species P. infundibularis in Taoist, shamanic practices at Mount Hua might prove a topic worthy of consideration.

In addition to its being considered a kind of ginseng in its own right, the root of Physochlaina infundibularis ('Physochlainae Radix') is sometimes passed off in the ginseng trade as a substitute for the more costly roots of the true ginsengs Panax ginseng and Panax quinquefolius – a dangerous practice which could lead to the (potentially fatal), anticholinergic poisoning of unwitting users of these famous tonics, although the substitution tends to be a feature of local, Chinese (rather than international) trade.

[Note: as indicated previously, above, Physochlaina infundibularis is claimed (in a Russian language website) also to be native to what was once the extreme northeast of China (see Outer Manchuria), but is now the Primorskiy Krai region of the Russian Far East.] The Russian name for the plant is given as Пузырница воронковидная (Puzeernitsa Voronkovidnaya) i.e. "funnel-shaped bladder plant" / "the bladder-bearing plant with funnel-shaped flowers", which, like the Chinese lou dou pao nang cao is simply a translation of the scientific name for the plant. The plant illustrated in the image on the website page resembles Physochlaina physaloides but the description provided pertains to P. infundibularis.]

=== Physochlaina macrophylla ===
大叶泡囊草 Da-ye Pao-nang-t'sao / da ye pao nang cao (= "big-leaf Physochlaina" - translating the specific name macrophylla - Greek for "(having) large leaves" (the disproportionately large leaves dwarf the modest violet flowers)). Like the root of Physochlaina infundibularis, that of P. macrophylla has also (apparently) occasionally been passed off as that of Panax in the Chinese ginseng trade: '(The root of) Physochlaina macrophylla Bonati, a native of Honan, China, in appearance is very much like ginseng but slightly red; one should avoid using it as a substitute for ginseng as its alkaloid causes vomiting'.

=== Physochlaina physaloides ===
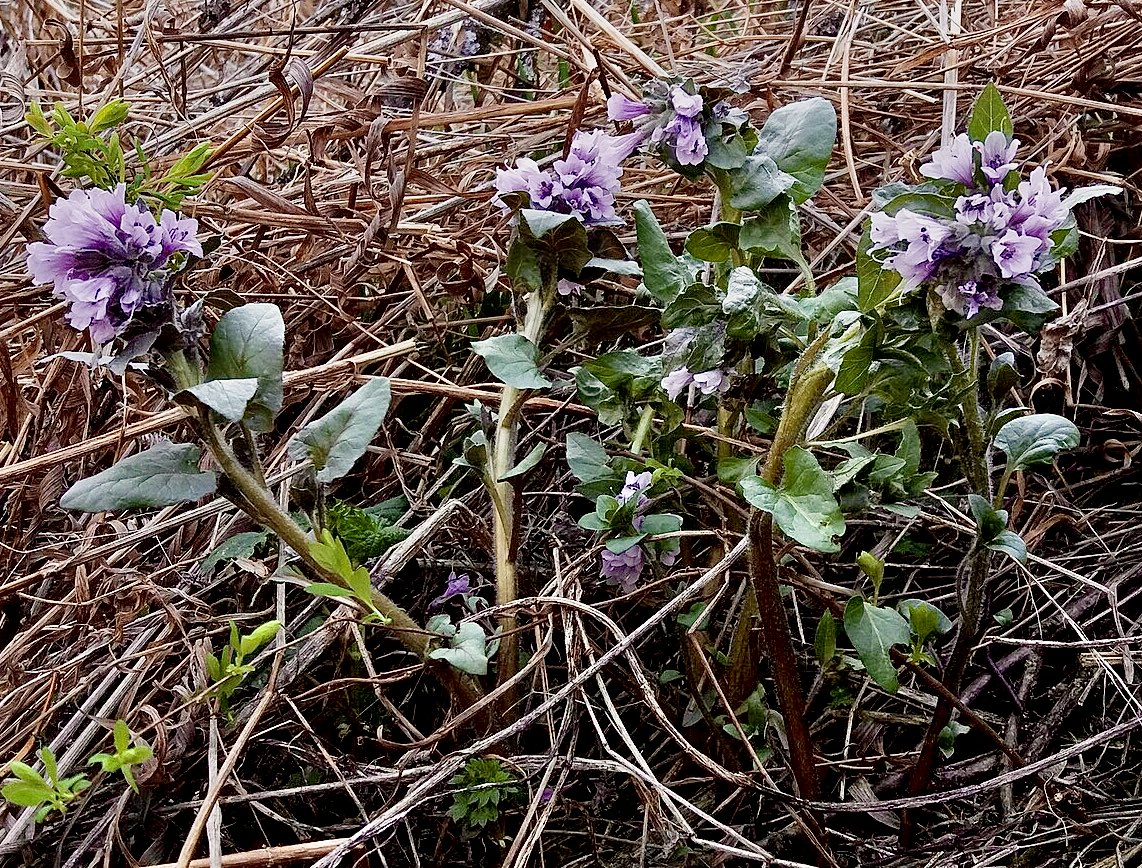
Physochlaina physaloides blooming in early May near Cherga, Altai Republic, Southern Siberia

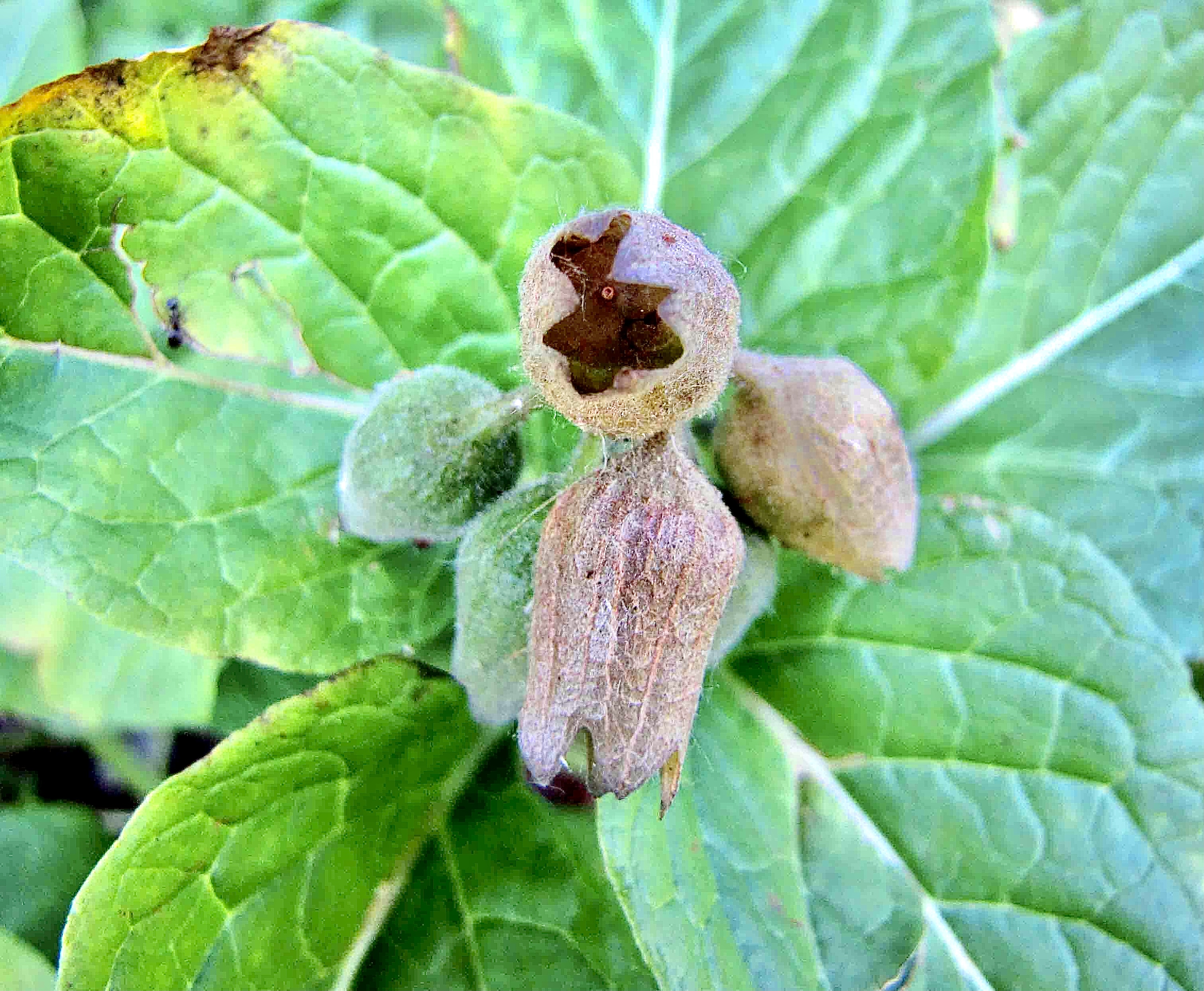
Physochlaina physaloides fruiting in the Botanical Garden of the University of Vienna

泡囊草 Pao-nang-ts'ao / pao nang cao (= "(common) Physochlaina") is the Standard Chinese name of the widespread species P. physaloides and the drug derived from it, which is used in the traditional medicine of Mongolia, where the plant has the common name Yagaan Khyn Khors and is also sometimes known by the Tibetan name Tampram. In the traditional systems of medicine in China and Mongolia it is considered to have the effects of 'combatting weakness', 'warming up the stomach', 'soothing the mental condition' and relieving asthma. It is also used for treating 'diarrhea due to deficiency of vital energy with symptoms of cold' and 'cough or asthma caused by excessive phlegm or neurasthenia'. Note: the medical concept neurasthenia – now largely abandoned in Western medicine – is expressed in Chinese as shenjing shuairuo (simplified Chinese: 神经衰弱), a compound of shenjing 'nervous' and shuairuo 'weakness', and the Chinese condition so described is a culture-bound syndrome encompassing debility, emotional turmoil, excitement, tension-induced pain and sleep disturbances, caused by a depletion of qi ('vital energy') and impaired functioning of the wuzang (= 'five vital organs').

A recent chemical analysis of the plant revealed the presence of the following compounds: in the above-ground parts, the flavonoids neoisorutin, glucoepirutin, rutin, quercetin- 3-O-β-D-glucofuranosyl-(6→I)-α-L-rhamnopyranoside-7-α-L-rhamnopyranoside and the alkaloids hyoscyamine, scopolamine and 6-hydroxyatropine; while the underground organs yielded the flavonoids liquiritigenin, guaiaverine, coumarin, scopolin, fabriatrin, scopoletin, umbelliferone, and also β-sitosterol, 3-O-β-D-glucopyranoside-β-sitosterol and the alkaloids atropine, scopolamine and cuscohygrine.

=== Physochlaina praealta ===
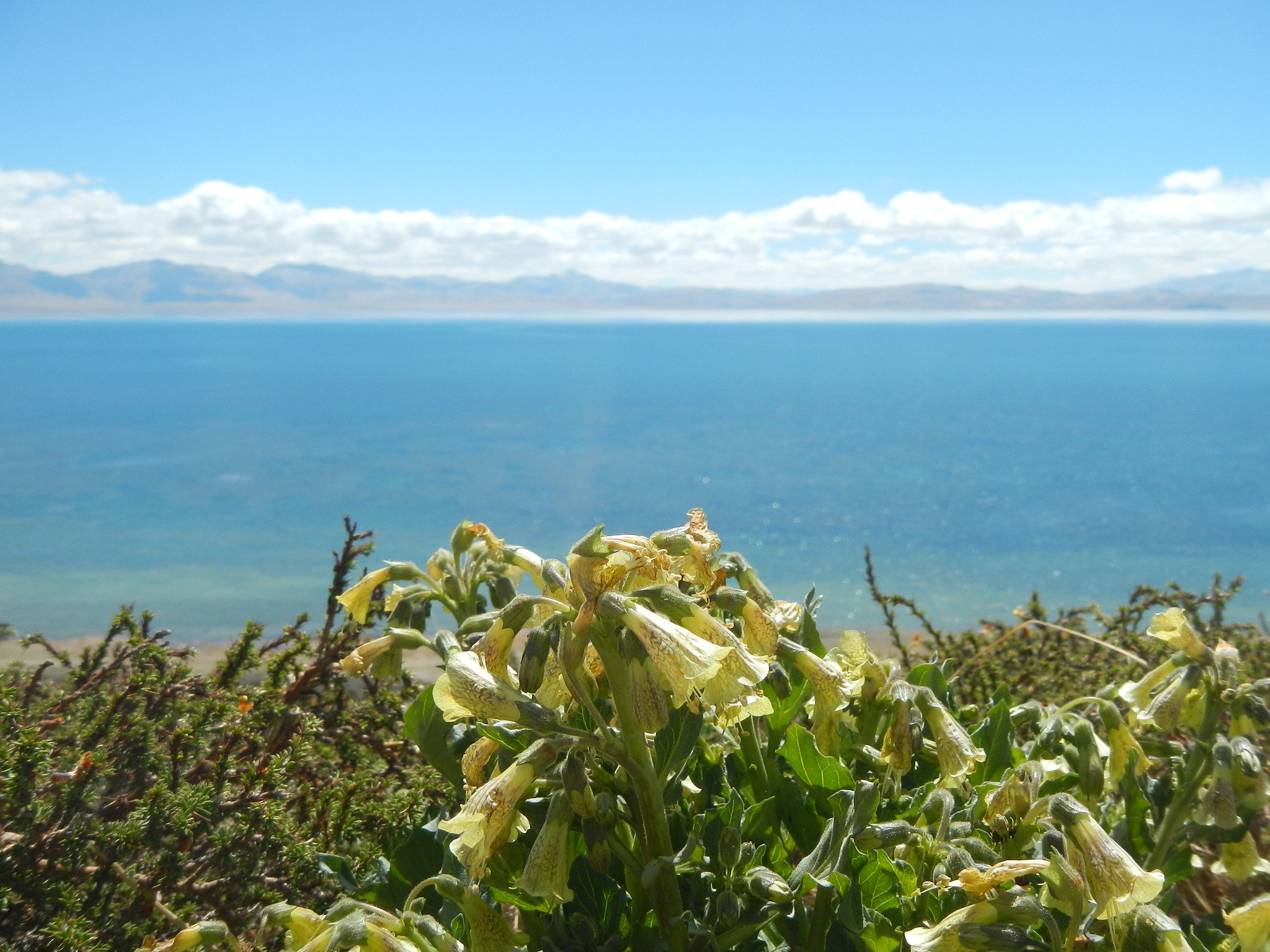
Physochlaina praealta in bloom near the northern shore of the Tibetan sacred lake Manasarovar (known also as Mapam Yumtso) near the (equally sacred) Mount Kailash

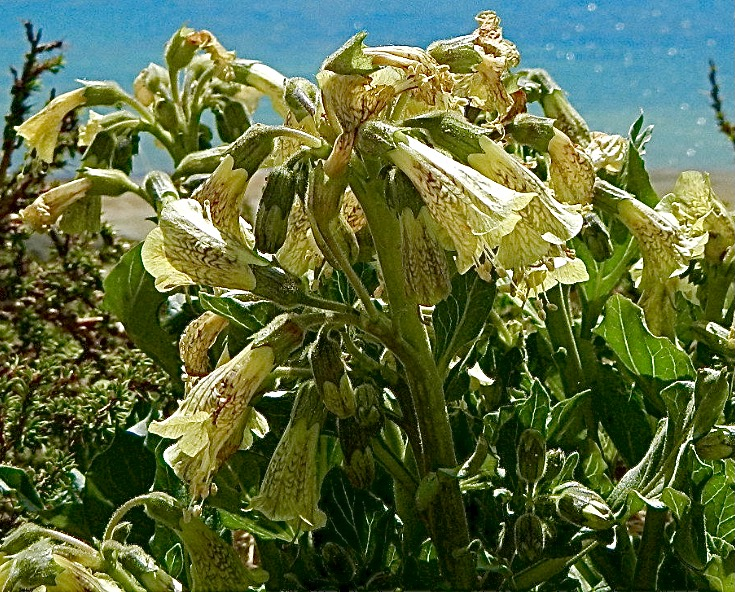
Image detail, showing pale yellow, brown-veined flowers

西藏泡囊草 (H'si-Tsang-pao-nang-ts'ao / xi zang pao nang cao = "Tibetan Physochlaina") is the Standard Chinese name given both to Physochlaina praealta (Decne) Miers. and the drug prepared from its roots and aerial parts. This has been used in Tibet as a substitute for Tsang-ch'ieh (transliterated also as Zang Qie) – Anisodus tanguticus, more commonly known in China as shān làngdàng (= 山莨菪 = 'mountain henbane'). Unsurprisingly, for a tropane-containing plant, P. praealta has been recognised in India to have the belladonna-like property of causing mydriasis and is also used there as a topical medication in the treatment of boils.

Corroboration of the possession of antiseptic properties by Physochlaina praealta was provided recently by the publication (in 2019) of a paper entitled (most unhelpfully in this context) Isolation of Anemonin from Pulsatilla wallichiana and its Biological Activities. In a manner not so much as hinted at by its title, this paper discusses not only the effects of aqueous extracts of the eponymous Pulsatilla species but also of methanol extracts of Physochlaina praealta on various pathogens and medical conditions.

In their prefatory remarks, Iftikhar et al. note that, in Baltistan, the plant, known locally as Luntung, is known to be poisonous and to have medicinal properties beneficial to both animals and humans, its leaves being used as antiseptic bedding material in cattle sheds and its seeds and flowers being used to treat toothache

The methanolic extract of P. praealta was studied for the following biological activities: antibacterial, antifungal, anti-inflammatory, anticancer, cytotoxic, phytotoxic, brine shrimp lethality and insecticidal properties.

The results of the tests for antibacterial activity revealed that the extract exhibited the highest percentage inhibition against Staphylococcus aureus (68.54%), followed by Escherichia coli (10.04%), Bacillus subtilis (06.96%) and Salmonella typhi (01.04%) while it remained inactive against Shigella flexneri and Pseudomonas aeruginosa.

In tests for antifungal activity the extract proved inactive against the species Candida albicans, Trichophyton rubrum, Aspergillus niger, Microsporum canis and Fusarium lini.

In the test for anti-inflammatory activity the extract exhibited 17.6% inhibition at a concentration 25 mg/mL, Ibuprofen being used as a standard drug for comparison and showing 73.2% inhibition at the same concentration.

In the first test for anticancer activity doxorubicin was used as the standard drug of comparison against HeLa cell lines, showing 73% inhibition at 30 μg/mL concentration. At the same concentration, the extract exhibited 30% inhibition and was deemed inactive against HeLa cell lines by comparison.

The second test involved testing for anticancer activity on highly metastatic cancer cells - for which the alveolar rhabdomyosarcoma cell line Rh30 was chosen. After treatment with 50 μg/mL, far from a hoped-for decrease in cell viability, the P. praealta methanolic extract actually slightly increased the cell viability up to 10%.

In the cytotoxicity test, the extract exhibited 22% inhibition, and was considered nontoxic against 3T3 cell lines at the concentration 30 μg/mL, while the standard drug 'cycroamide' [typo in Iftikhar paper re.cyclophosphamide?] used for purposes of comparison, showed a 70% inhibition against 3T3 cell lines when applied at a similar concentration.

In the phytotoxicity test, the duckweed Lemna minor was used as the test species and the herbicide paraquat [mis-spelled 'parquet' in Iftikhar paper] was used for purposes of comparison. The activity was determined at concentrations of 10, 100 and 1000 μg/mL. The P. praealta extract showed moderate phytotoxic activity at the highest concentrations.

In the brine shrimp lethality test, the P. praealta extract failed to show any significant activity.

[Note: while Iftikhar et al. investigated the insecticidal properties of the other medicinal plant in their study (the unrelated Pulsatilla wallichiana) they failed to do so in the case of Physochlaina praealta. This is particularly unfortunate in the light of the above-quoted account of the use of the plant as a cattle bedding material in which an insecticidal aspect (e.g. the control of fleas, lice etc.) might be expected in addition to some antiseptic activity (proven in the course of the Iftikhar study - particularly in relation to Staphylococcus aureus)].

Iftikhar notes helpfully the existence of three previous papers devoted to the investigation of the chemistry and biology of Physochlaina praealta.

== Use in traditional medicine of Tibet and Mongolia ==
Physochlaina species have a long history of use in the systems of traditional medicine of Tibet and Mongolia as drugs having powerful anti-inflammatory effects against skin diseases and sexually transmitted diseases, in addition to their beneficial effects – both soothing and energizing – upon nervous disorders.

In the traditional system of classification of herbal drugs in Mongolian folk medicine, the plant is described as "bitter in taste with a cool, oily potency". It is used currently as an "antibacterial", an analgesic, an anticonvulsant, an antipyretic, an anti-parasitic, against anthrax, against encephalitis, against glanders, against parasitic worms of the skin and the gastrointestinal tract against tumors and to treat sexual unresponsiveness, aspermia, abdominal pain and hypothermia. On the negative side, it is said to be "ulcerogenic" i.e. to have the potential to cause ulcers of unspecified type [Note: this may be a terminological error in the W.H.O. text - the drug may be used against ulcers, rather than causing them].

== Hallucinogenic use of Physochlaina physaloides in Central Siberia ==
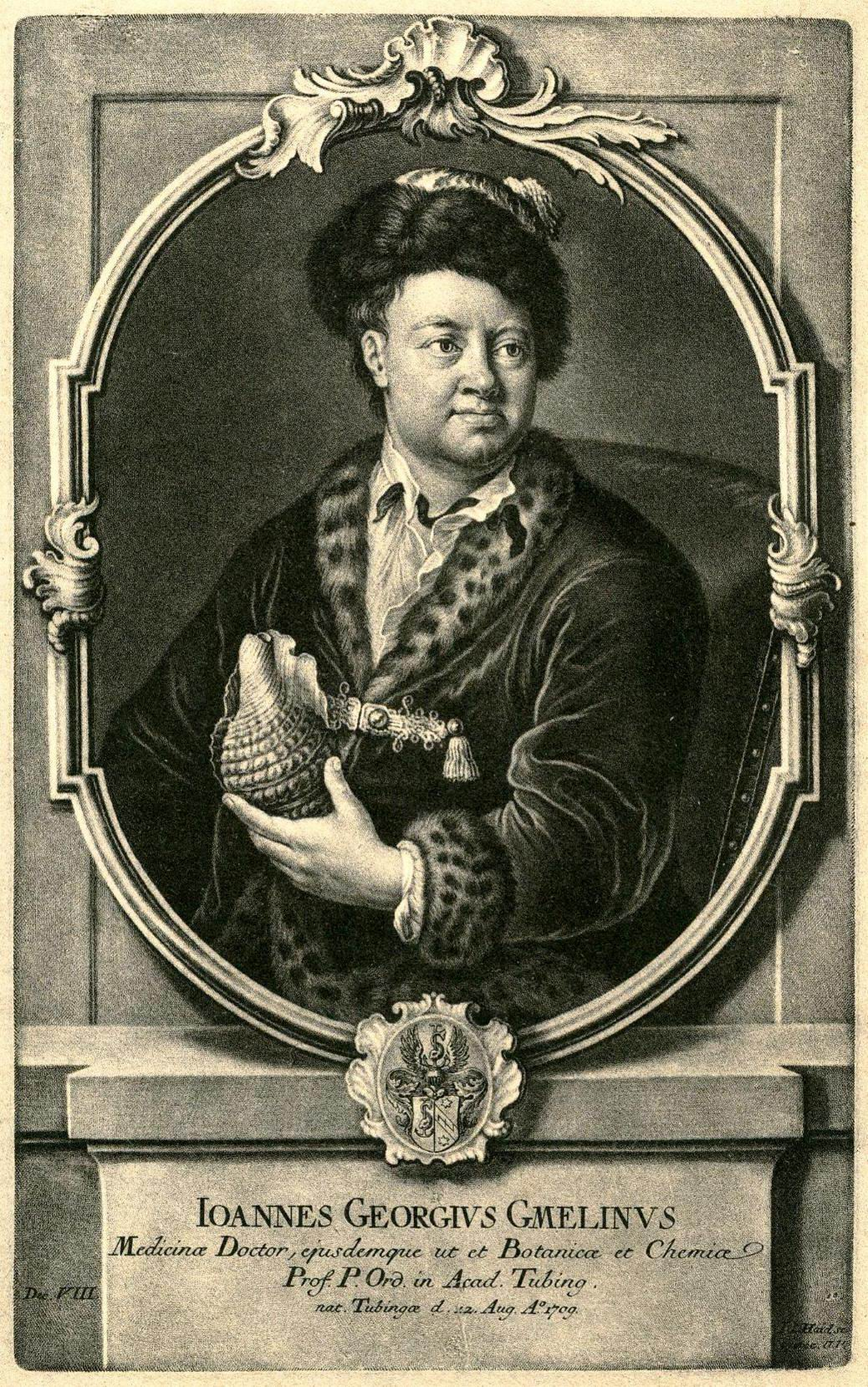
Johann Georg Gmelin, source of the first (oft-quoted) scientific account of the use of Physochlaina physaloides as an intoxicant in the Yenisei basin

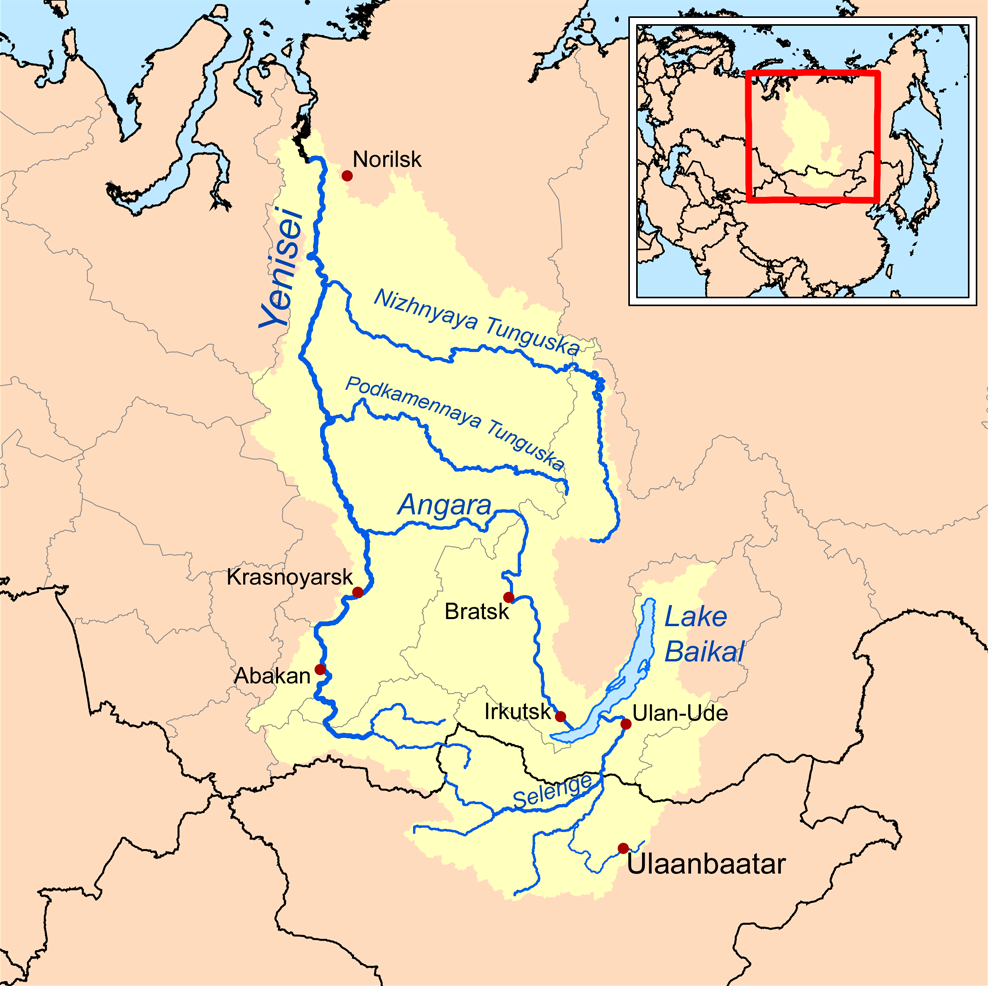
The Yenisei basin, showing the Angara and other tributaries

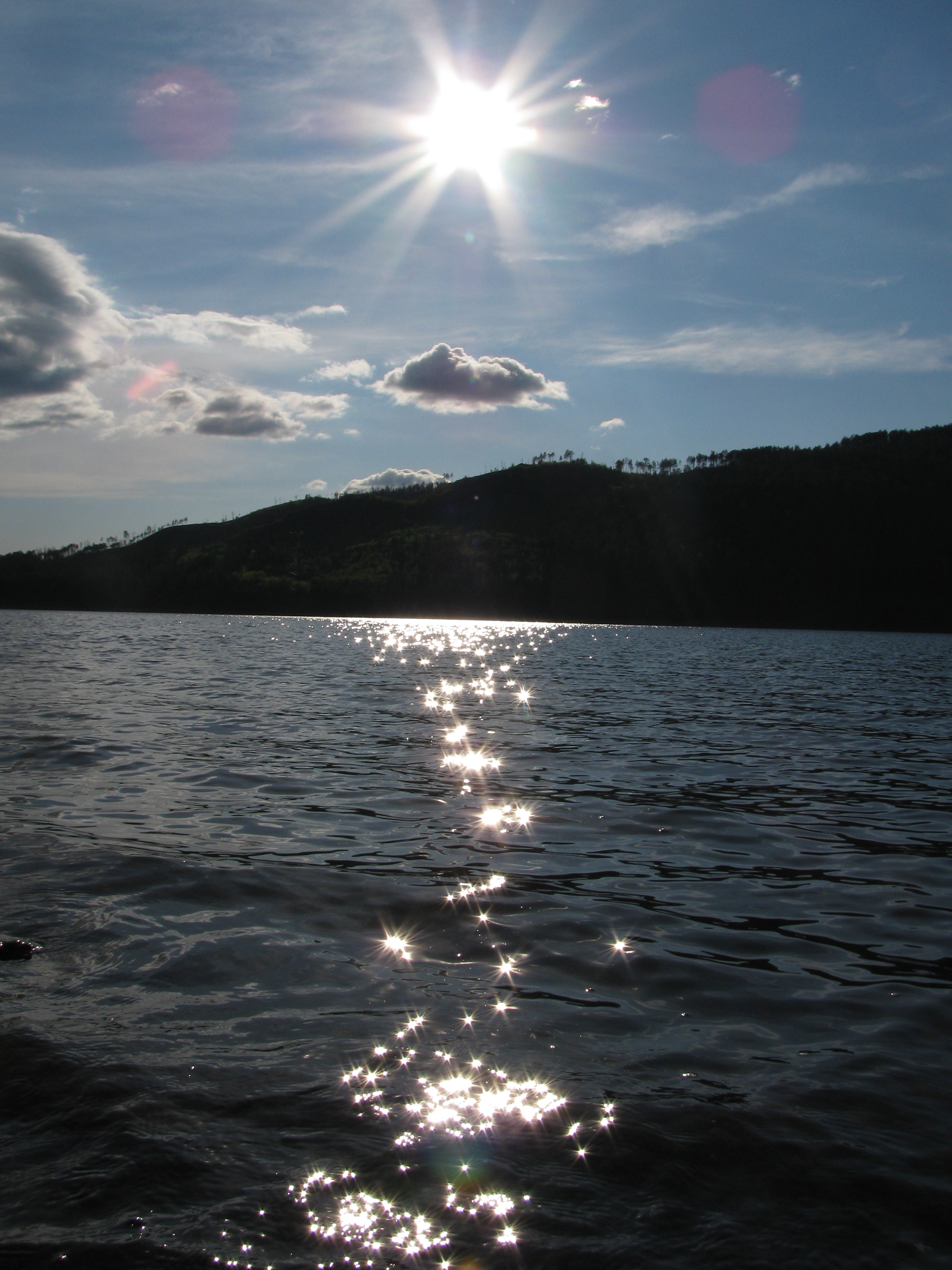
View of the Angara or Upper Tunguska River, a major tributary of the Yenisei – near the banks of which Gmelin encountered Physochlaina physaloides in the year 1738

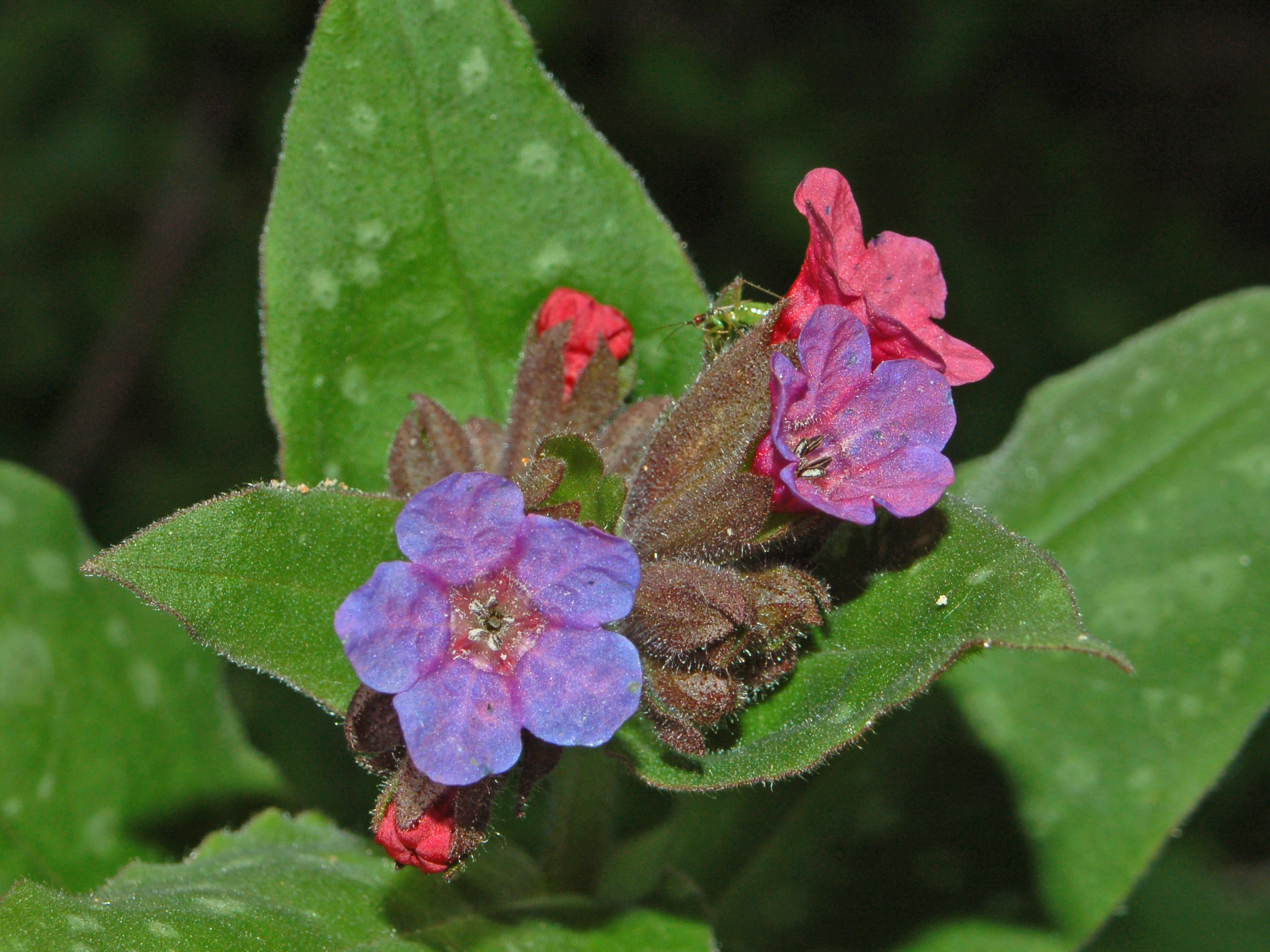
Pulmonaria officinalis, the herb for which a band of hungry Yeniseian Cossacks mistook Physochlaina physaloides – with dramatic results.

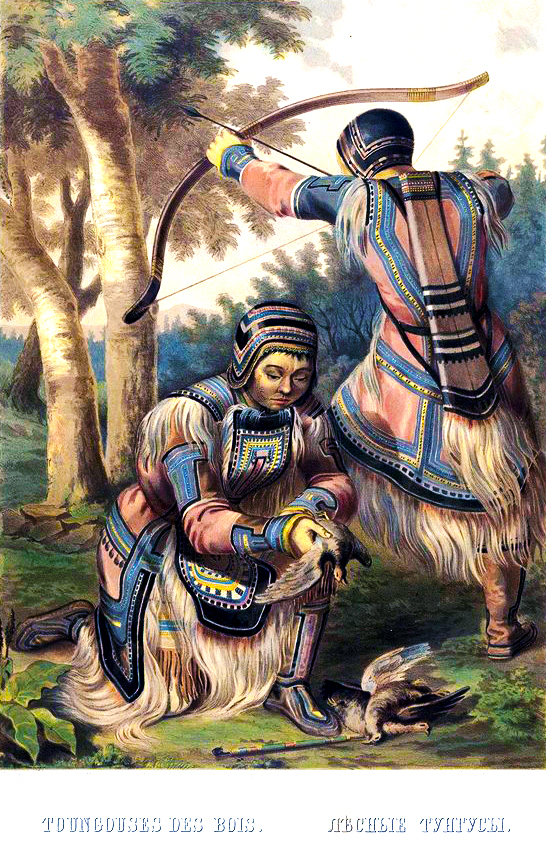
19th century depiction of hunting among the Evenks, one of a number of Tungusic peoples. Known in Gmelin's day simply as 'Tungus'. Makers and consumers of an hallucinogenic, Physochlaina-infused beer.

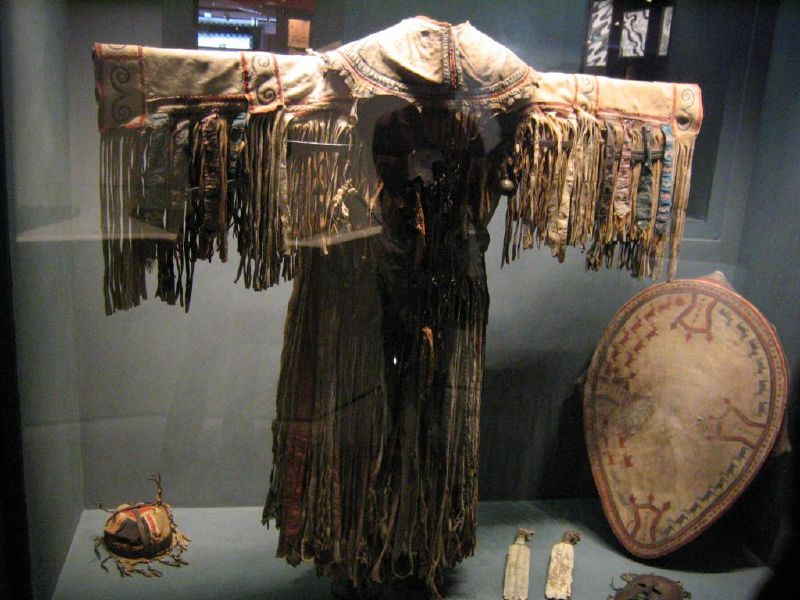
Ceremonial costume and drum of an Evenk shaman. Tropane-containing Solanaceae, such as Physochlaina spp., have frequently been employed in some forms of Shamanism to facilitate entry to an altered state of consciousness.

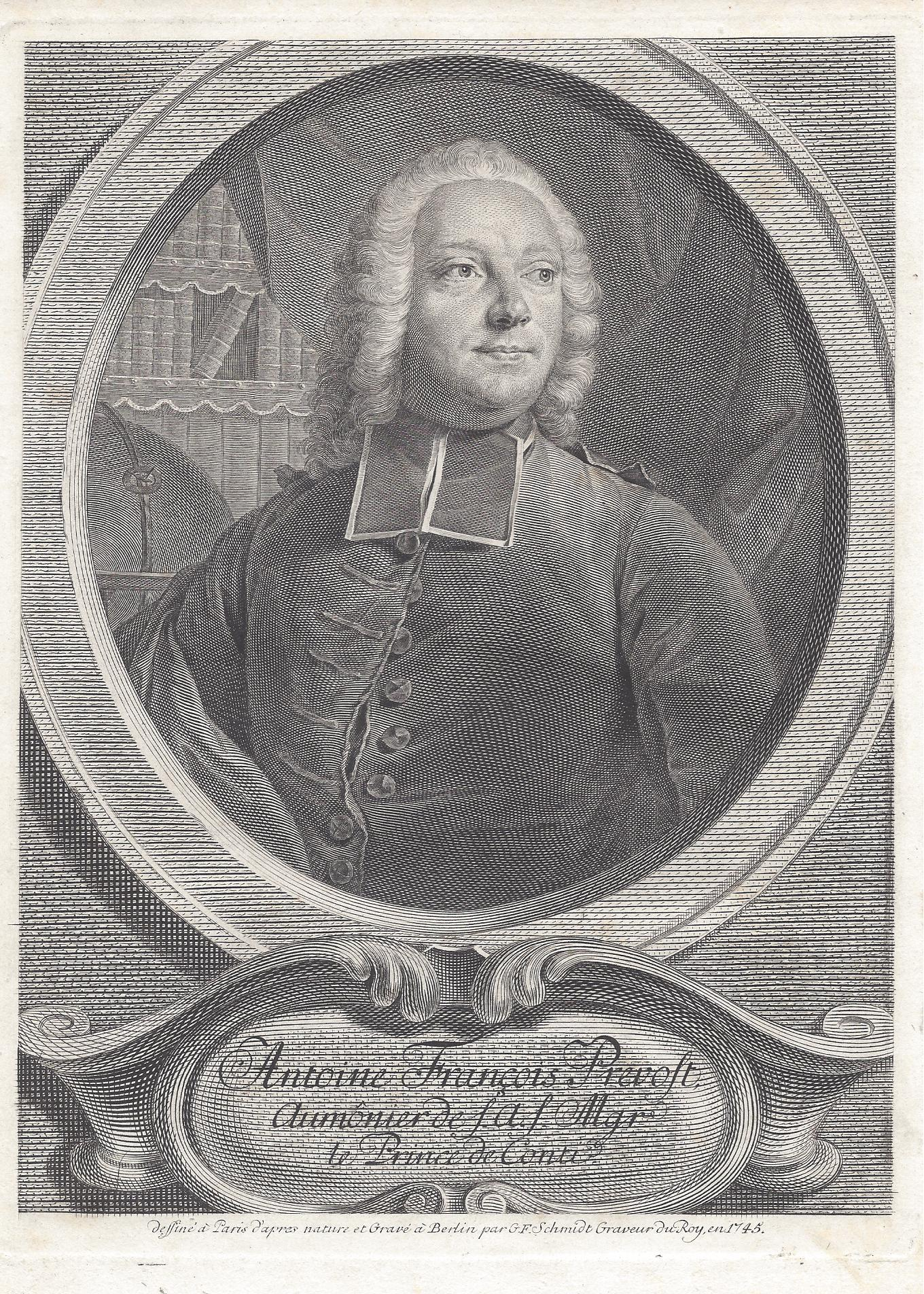
Abbé Antoine François Prévost, author of the first 15 volumes of Histoire générale des Voyages, volume 18 of which made Gmelin's account of Physochlaina use better-known to subsequent scholars

Professor Orazio Comes, author of the first work on recreational drugs to include Gmelin's account of Physochlaina use still under the incorrect designation 'Hyoscyamus')

Intrepid German naturalist, botanist and geographer Johann Georg Gmelin records in his Reise durch Sibirien of 1752 a remarkable account of the intoxicating properties of Physochlaina physaloides, which bears repetition in its entirety. On 11 August of the year 1738, Gmelin and his fellow explorer Stepan Krasheninnikov were negotiating the cataracts of the lower reaches of the Angara river – then known as the Upper Tunguska – in the Yenisei Basin, when they encountered a waterfall with a curious name:

...we came to Bessanova or Pyanovskaya D. which lies on the left bank of the river, and, two versts down, to another falls – Pyanoy Porog [ Russian: Пьаной Порог: 'The Drunken Rapids' ]...They were christened The Drunken Rapids by the first Yeniseian Cossacks to travel up from Yeniseisk on the stream and pass through them. They found in the vicinity of these rapids a herb, which they took, from the appearance of its leaves and flowers, to be Lungwort [Russian: Медуница: Medunitsa] and so used the leaves in the preparation of a vegetable soup and the roots to make a purée and, partaking of these dishes, grew so utterly intoxicated that they knew not what they were doing. When they had returned to their senses, they named these falls The Drunken Rapids and, because one suffers a headache after such a debauch, they named the falls that they encountered next Pokhmelnoy Porog [ Russian: Похмельной Порог: The Hungover Rapids ].

His curiosity aroused, Gmelin investigated, and discovered an attractive new species:

This account has given me the opportunity to reveal the identity of the beautiful plant involved, which was unknown to any botanist before me: Hyoscyamus foliis integerrimis calicibus inflatis subglobosis [Botanical Latin: 'The Henbane having simple, untoothed leaves and (fruiting) calyces that are more or less round and inflated' [ i.e. like those of a Physalis ]] Linn. h. Ups. 44. 2.

Having identified the (Linnaean) genus Hyoscyamus to which the intoxicating plant of The Drunken Rapids (since moved by Don to the genus Physochlaina) belonged, Gmelin went on to quiz his local guides and learned the following concerning its intentional consumption:

If one steeps the leaves or even the finely-chopped roots of this plant in brewed beer – or, better yet, in beer that is still undergoing fermentation – then it takes but a single glass of such beer to make a man exceedingly foolish: it is surely a strange draught that he quaffs, for he is robbed of all his senses, or at least finds his senses grossly disordered, mistaking tiny things for huge ones: a straw for the thickest of beams, a drop of water for a mighty ocean and a mouse for an elephant. Wherever he goes he encounters [ what he imagines to be ] insurmountable obstacles. He pictures continually to himself the cruellest and most dreadful imaginings of an inevitable death awaiting him, and, as it seems, all this fills him with despair, because his senses are withering away; thus, should one such drunkard go to step over a beam, he will take a great stride out of all proportion to the actual size of it, while another will see deep water in front of him [ where there is only shallow ] such that he dare not venture into it.

In conclusion, Gmelin then adds, concerning the plant itself:

The local inhabitants often use these roots when they want to play a prank upon each other. The Russian merchants often bring these roots back with them when they return to Russia, because they maintain them to be a sovereign remedy for bleeding haemorrhoids and also against the haematuria – a claim which I have been unable to verify.

Gmelin's Reise durch Sibirien – with its evocative account of his findings concerning the plant now known to science as Physochlaina physaloides – received a translation into French which was published as part of Volume 18 of Abbé Prévost's monumental Histoire générale des voyages – a compendium of eighteenth century exploration by land and sea, continued beyond the original fifteen volumes, by other authors following the death of Prévost in 1763. The Histoire translation is by no means always a word-for-word rendering of Gmelin's original text, and, in the passage concerning Physochlaina, a sentence entirely absent from the Gmelin account has been added, which nonetheless has been retained in subsequent retellings of the passage in question:

Il parle continuellement sans savoir ce qu'il dit. [Translation: 'He speaks continually, without knowing what he is saying' – said of the man intoxicated by a single glass of potent Physochlaina beer].

The first work devoted exclusively to recreational drugs to draw on Prévost's translation of Gmelin's account of Evenki Physochlaina use was A History of Tobacco with notes on the use of all Excitants currently known by Italian botanist Professor Orazio Comes, written in French and published in Naples in 1900.

Comes's summary of the Prévost translation was included by German Botanist Carl Hartwich in his classic and influential work of 1911 Die Menschlichen Genussmittel (= 'The Pleasure-drugs of Mankind'), which, in turn, was quoted by 21st century expert on hallucinogens Dr. Christian Rätsch in his The Encyclopedia of Psychoactive Plants of 2005. Hartwich speaks only of 'Hyoscyamus' with no indication of the species involved and, while Rätsch uses the correct species name physaloides he still includes the plant in his discussion of the various Hyoscyamus species – seemingly unaware that the plant was actually made the type species of the new genus Physochlaina by George Don as far back as the year 1838.

== Physochlaina and Amanita: similarities in descriptions of macropsia in accounts of two Siberian hallucinogens ==
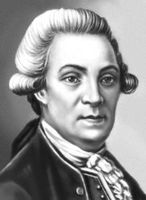
Stepan Krasheninnikov, fellow explorer with Gmelin and one of the first scholars to document the use of Amanita muscaria as a hallucinogen in Siberia

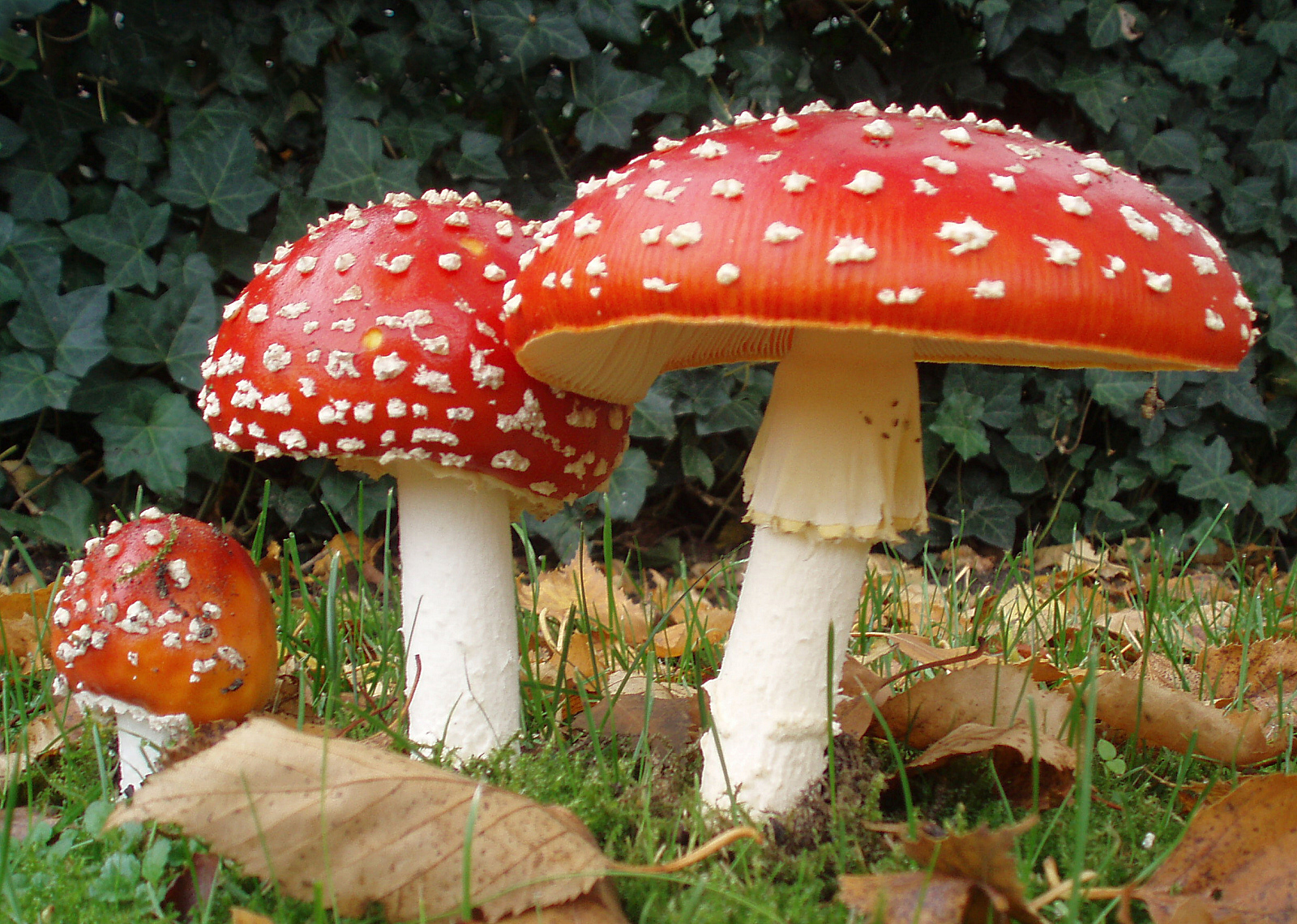
Amanita muscaria - the intoxicating mushroom noted by Krasheninnikov to cause macropsia - which Gmelin reported also to be a prominent symptom of Physochlaina narcosis

There exist curious similarities between Gmelin's account of the effects of Physochlaina beer – as detailed above – and his student and fellow traveller Krasheninnikov's account of the effects of a very different, and better-known, Siberian hallucinogen, namely Amanita muscaria, the fly agaric. Gmelin and Krasheninnikov's accounts of the effects of intoxication by the plant and mushroom in question both derive from their participation in the extraordinary Great Northern Expedition (known also as the Second Kamchatka Expedition). As described above, they were travelling together in Central Siberia in the summer of 1738 on the occasion of Gmelin's discovery of Physochlaina physaloides and learning from the Evenk of the curious effects produced by the beer which they prepared from it. Gmelin was, at the time, one of three professors heading the Academic Group of the expedition, and his particular area of expertise within that group concerned the animal, vegetable and mineral kingdoms, his brief being to document the fauna, flora and mineral wealth of Siberia encountered in their travels. After many adventures, including the encounter with Physochlaina physaloides on the Angara river near Yeniseysk, Professors Gmelin and Müller, student Krasheninnikov and many other expedition members gathered at Vitus Bering's base at Yakutsk. It was from here that Gmelin sent Krasheninnikov ahead to Okhotsk and Kamchatka to reconnoitre, make preliminary observations and prepare accommodation, and it was thus that he came to be the member of the expedition with the most extensive knowledge of the Kamchatka peninsula, publishing his observations in 1755 in the work Описание земли Камчатки (Description of the Land of Kamchatka) – from Chapter 14 of which the following passage is translated:

...persons thus intoxicated [by Amanita muscaria] have hallucinations, as if in a fever; they are subject to various visions, terrifying or felicitous, depending on differences in temperament, owing to which some jump, some dance, others cry and suffer great terrors, while some might deem a small crack to be as wide as a door, and a tub of water as deep as the sea.

To the above may readily be compared Gmelin's mistaking a drop of water for a mighty ocean and He pictures continually to himself the cruellest and most dreadful imaginings of an inevitable death awaiting him. The phenomenon, described in similar terms by Gmelin and Krasheninnikov in their respective accounts, is that of macropsia - whereby small objects are perceived as being enormous - a symptom of (among other conditions, both natural and self-inflicted) the use of psychoactive drugs (see also dysmetropsia). It is not clear, in this context, whether the similarity between the two accounts is due simply to the fungal and the plant drug eliciting similar symptoms or whether there has been a borrowing of phraseology from one author to another (in which direction it is hard to say). The inference would likely be that any borrowing were from the Physochlaina account to the Amanita account, were it not for the fact that accounts of macropsia caused by tropane-containing Solanaceae are rare, while those of macropsia caused by Amanita muscaria are common (or perhaps merely oft-repeated, from a few early sources). To this question one may further adduce the account of Amanita muscaria-induced macropsia in another early source, namely that of Georg Heinrich von Langsdorff, which seems as close in tone to Gmelin's account as does that of Krasheninnikov:

The nerves are highly stimulated, and in this state the slightest effort of will produces very powerful effects. Consequently, if one wishes to step over a small stick or straw, he steps and jumps as though the obstacles were tree trunks. If a man is ordinarily talkative...he involuntarily blurts out secrets, fully conscious of his actions and aware of his secret but unable to hold his nerves in check. The muscles are controlled by an uncoordinated activity of the nerves themselves, uninfluenced by and unconnected with the higher willpower of the brain, and thus it has occasionally happened that persons in this stage of intoxication found themselves driven irresistibly into ditches, streams, ponds and the like, seeing the impending danger before their eyes but unable to avoid certain death except by the assistance of friends who rushed to their aid.

- compare Gmelin's a straw for the thickest of beams and he will take a great stride out of all proportion to the actual size of it. One recalls also the reference to the danger (or fear) of falling into deep water. Furthermore it is possible that the phrase 'he speaks continually without knowing what he is saying' which has crept into the Prévost ' Histoire générale... ' version of Gmelin's account may have influenced von Langsdorff's description of the compulsive babbling of the Amanita-intoxicated individual.

The northern Tungusic peoples, such as the Evens of eastern Siberia and the Evenks of central Siberia (encountered by Gmelin), have occasionally been reported to have used Amanita muscaria as an intoxicant, although with nothing like the frequency of certain other ethnolinguistic groups, such as, for instance, the Itelmens and Koryaks encountered by Krasheninnikov. The use of Amanita muscaria by the Tungus (Evenki) as an additional ingredient to their Physochlaina beer would furnish yet a third explanation for the similarities in the reported effects of the Tungus drink and the Fly Agaric, but Gmelin makes no mention of such a fungal ingredient and, given that the use of Physochlaina as an intoxicant appears to have ceased among the Tungus of the Angara river region, no more information on the subject is likely to be forthcoming.

== Physochlaina physaloides and the narcotic "coffee" of Dauria ==
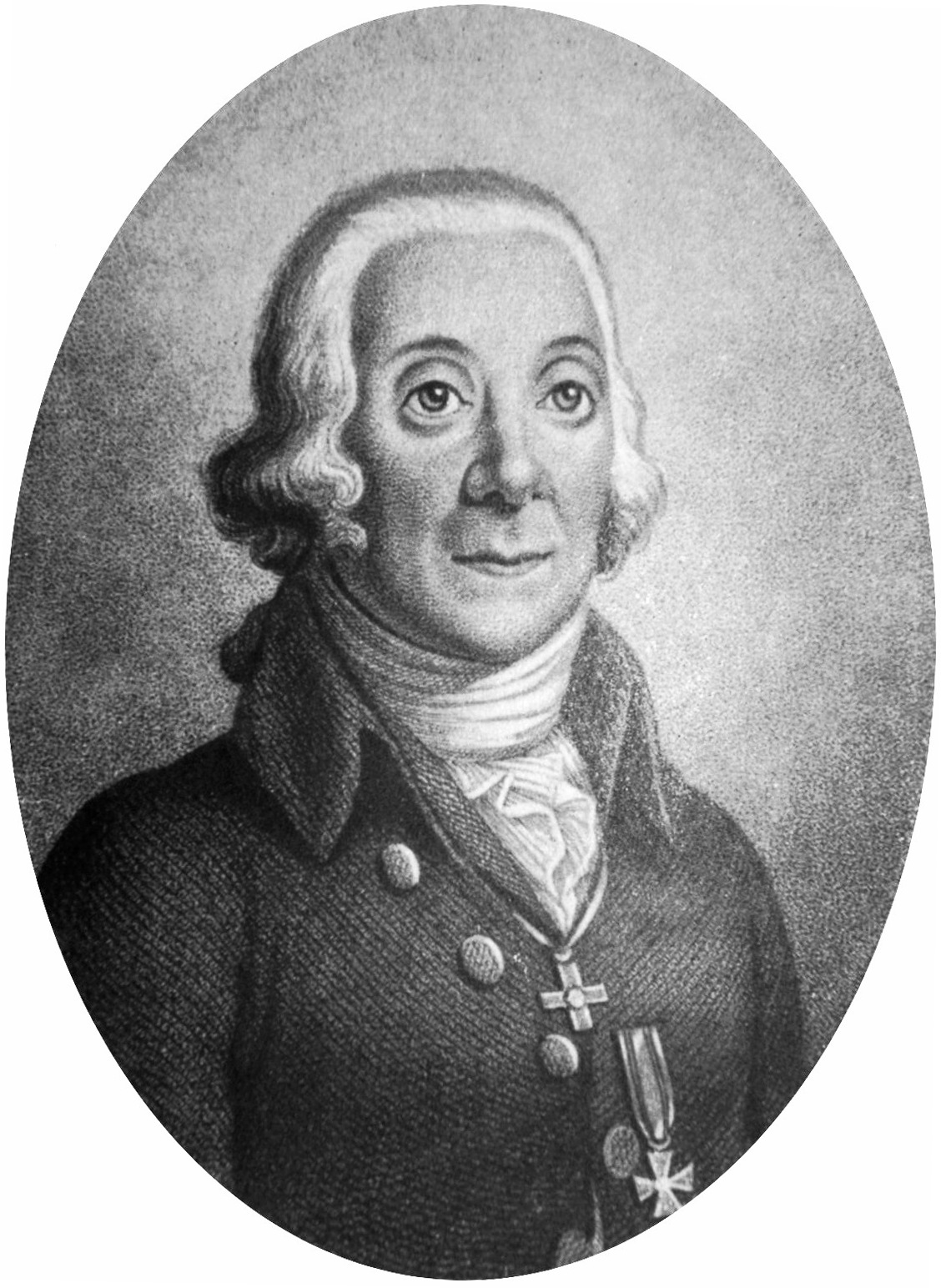
18th-century Prussian botanist, zoologist and ethnographer Peter Simon Pallas, the first to document Daurian Tungus use of the seed of Physochlaina physaloides to brew a narcotic "coffee"

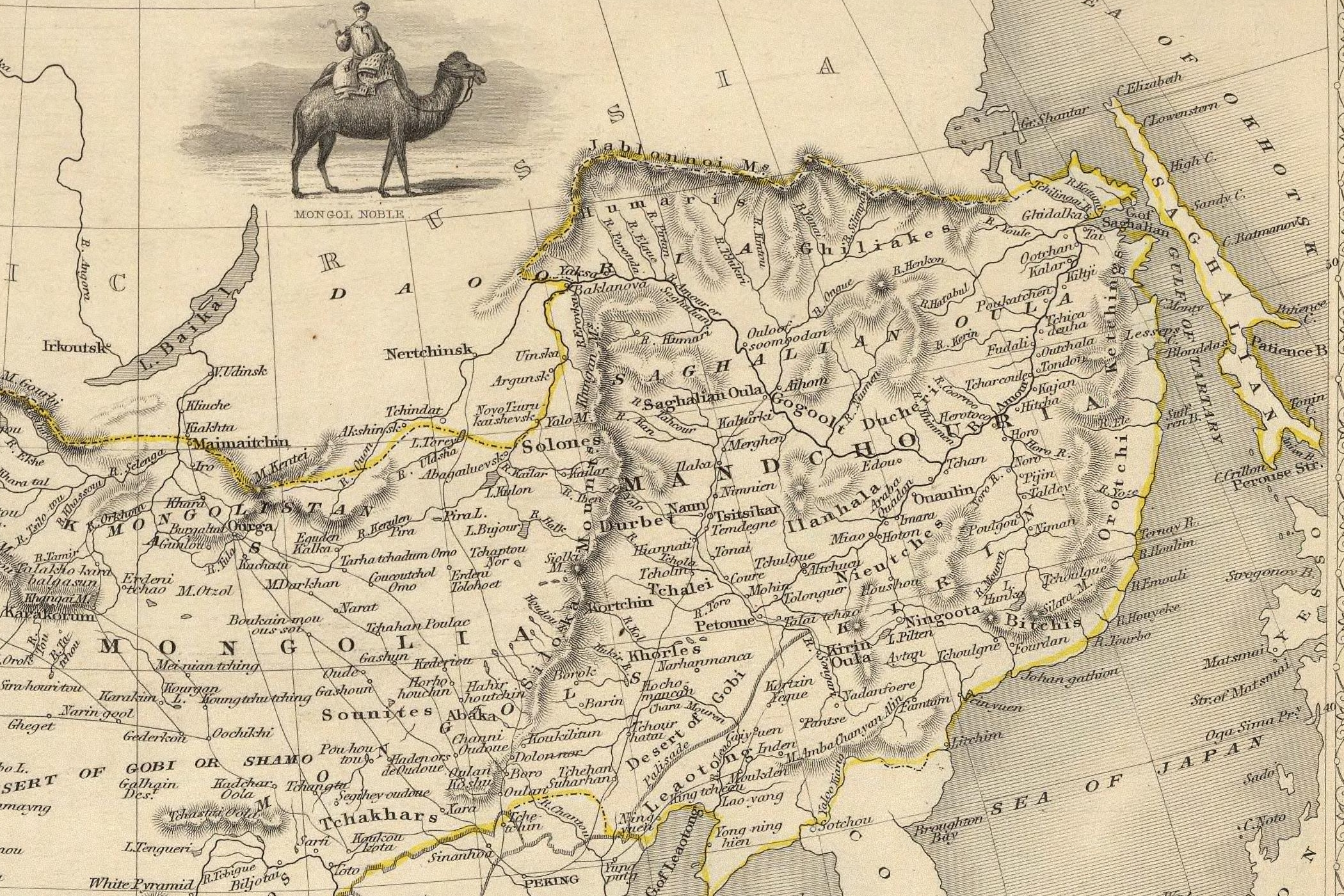
John Tallis's 1851 map of Dauria, Mongolia and Manchuria, showing (top left, south of the (then) regional capital Nerchinsk) Tchindat (= Chindanturuk) on the river Onon, near its confluence with the Borzya where Pallas encountered Physochlaina physaloides on Crane Rock (Tungus: Kiroé).

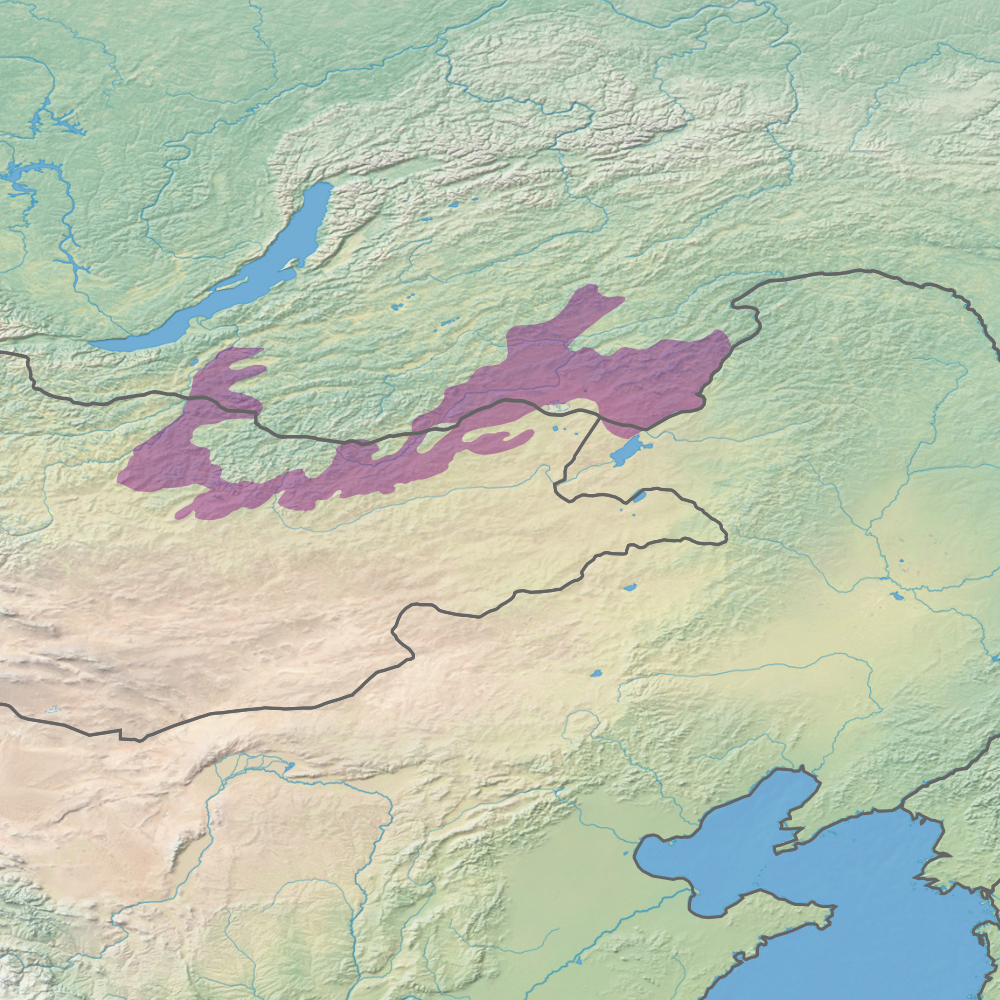
Daurian forest steppe ecoregion (shaded purple), east of Lake Baikal, west of Lake Hulun and straddling the border between Russia and Mongolia

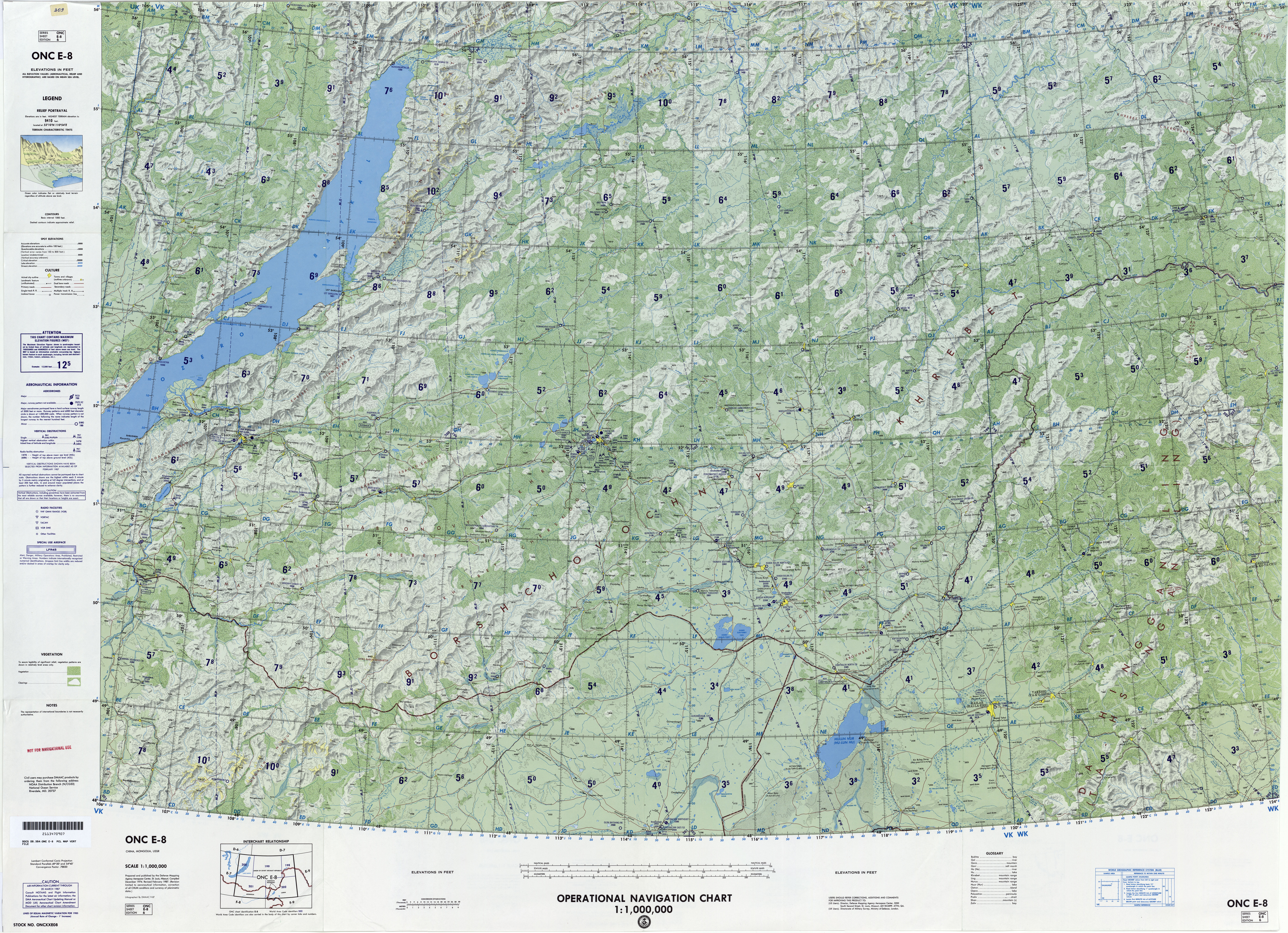
U.S. navigation chart covering Dauria (Transbaikalia), showing Chindanturuk under the name Chindant pervyy i.e. "First (=oldest) Chindant", north of salt lakes Barun-Torey and Zu(u)n-Torey on the border with Mongolia (bottom centre)

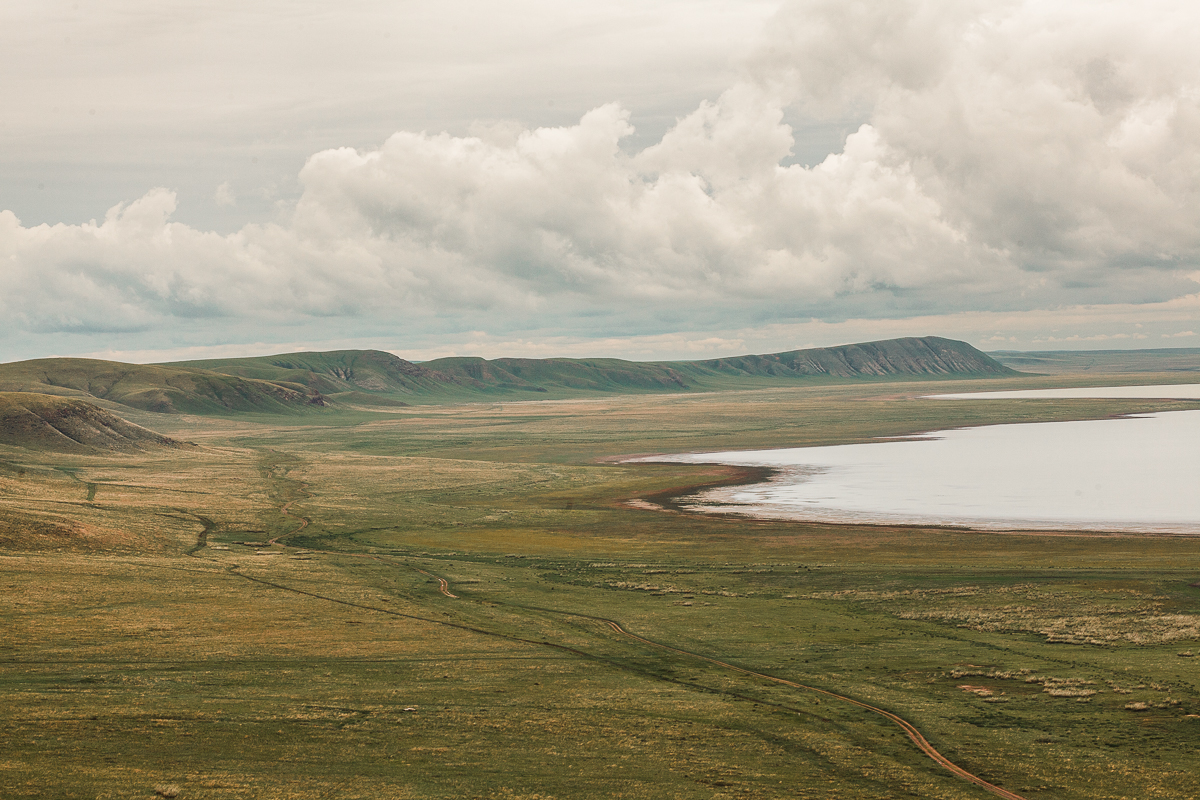
Daurian landscape: the salt lake Zuun-Torey (Pallas's "Zagan Nuur"), Borzinsky District, lying just to the south of the Borzya River (Mongolian: Boorj), a tributary of the Onon

That the Evenks of Central Siberia were not the only Tungusic people to use Physochlaina physaloides as a recreational drug is made plain in a work by Siberian explorer Peter Simon Pallas, first published in German, but more widely known in the French translation of 1793. After accepting a professorship at the St Petersburg Academy of Sciences offered him by Empress Catherine the Great, Pallas led an expedition lasting from 1768 to 1774, which took him from the central provinces of Russia far to the east - all the way to the lands beyond Lake Baikal. It was here in Dauria (a.k.a. "Dahuria") - where the eastern extremity of Mongolia meets southern Siberia and western Manchuria - that he encountered, not only the Daur people for whom the region is named, but also certain Tungusic tribes who prepared a curious intoxicating drink. The following passage is translated from de la Peyronie's French edition of 1793.

1772. 31 May. The road to Chindanturuk never leaves the river (Onon) with its charming bed. The banks presented a delightful prospect of Spring flowers...At a distance of twenty-seven versts from the stream Udagataï, one finds rising from the shallows of the river a great steep and craggy rock which the Tungus call Kiroé ("crane" in their language), lying near to the [ junction of the Onon with the river] Borsa...I observed growing among the nettles which surround the base of this rock the Physalis-like henbane (Hyoscyamus physaloides). The Tungus make use of its narcotic seed; they roast it like coffee and drink the decoction with their dinner.

A second account (later in publication date than the Reisen... but earlier than the Voyages...) of the relevant part of Pallas's expedition by an anonymous anthologist of eighteenth century travel writing provides some further details absent from the French translation and derived possibly from Pallas's original German text.

The lowlands lead onward to the outpost of Udagatai, and, farther yet to Chindanturuk, where one sees growing in abundance, beneath the nettles which grow beside the rocks, Hyosciamus physalodes [sic], a rare plant, the intoxicating seed (which ripens toward the end of July) of which the Tungus roast thoroughly in a frying pan, as one roasts coffee, and boil to make a beverage which they drink with their dinner.

The question naturally arises as to which Tungusic people (or peoples) it was that Pallas encountered in Dauria. The Daurs themselves are speakers of the Mongolic language Daur (a.k.a. Dagur), but there are three Daurian ethnic groupings of Tungus affiliation, namely the Oroqen, Solon and Hamnigan (spelled also "Khamnigan"). These three have all been considered subgroups of the Evenks, but the Solon and, more especially the Khamnigan have interacted closely with the Mongolic Daur, Buryat and Khalkha peoples to the extent that they are ethnically quite distinct from the Evenki of the Yenissei, encountered by Gmelin. Scholar of eastern Asiatic languages Professor Juha Janhunen of the University of Helsinki is of the opinion that the Khamnigan (with whom he has personally undertaken fieldwork) are of Mongolic rather than Tungusic ethnic affiliation and that, of the remaining two groups (Oroqen and Solon), the Oroqen are the closest to the Evenki proper (which group includes the Evenki of the Yenisei basin). If this is indeed the case, then it may have been the Oroqen who were preparing a narcotic drink from roasted Physochlaina seed, assuming that Physochlaina use was a peculiarly North Tungusic culture trait - as manifested also in the brewing of Physochlaina beer by the Evenki of the Yenisei.

There remain questions concerning the Tungus "coffee" itself: to guess at its effects one would need to know the average tropane alkaloid content of seeds and also to what extent - if any - the roasting or dry-frying of this seed would diminish such content.

A comparison of Gmelin's vivid description of the effects of the Yeniseian Physochlaina beer and such meagre information as is given in Pallas's account of the Physochlaina "coffee" of Dauria is instructive: the former paints a picture of an intoxication so strong as to be terrifying rather than pleasurable and accompanied by the profoundly disorientating symptom of macropsia, while the latter suggests almost a Tungus version of a coffee morning or dinner party where a mild stimulant like coffee or a mild intoxicant like wine is consumed to promote conviviality: judging from the testimony of Gmelin, one doubts whether a consumer of Physochlaina beer could muster the coordination to eat at all, let alone converse coherently during a meal. Entheogens, as their name suggests, are generally used in a ritual or religious setting, whereas it is milder intoxicants, such as wine, or kava, which are used as a disinhibiting accompaniment to the communal consumption of food. This said, there is nothing in the Gmelin account that smacks of the religious (although it is not known if he ever witnessed Physochlaina intoxication at first hand) and there do not appear to be any surviving accounts of the use of Physochlaina physaloides in shamanic practices - if, indeed, any such ever existed.

Carl Hartwich mentions thus the Physochlaina "coffee" of the Tungus on page 327 of his monumental Die Menschlichen Genussmittel:

Hyoscyamus sp. Die gerösteten samen werden in Sibirien bei den Tungusen benutzt. Die dürften stark narkotisch sein. (Welter S. 427)) (Translation: Hyoscyamus sp. The roasted seeds are used by the Tungus in Siberia. They are likely to be very narcotic (Welter S. 427)).

As is the case with his note on Tungus Physochlaina beer, Hartwich quotes as a reference, not a primary source in German from the work of an 18th-century explorer, but a secondary French source - in this case a work devoted to coffee and its substitutes by one Henri Welter., page 427 of which bears the note:

Les Kalmouks et les Tongouses de la Sibérie se prépare des boissons semblables au café, les premiers avec les graines de l'Erable de Tartarie (Acer tartaricum, L.) et les seconds avec celles d'une espèce de jusquiame. (Translation: The Kalmuks and Tungus of Siberia prepare for themselves drinks similar to coffee, the former with the seeds of the Tartar Maple (Acer tartaricum L.) and the latter with those of a species of henbane).

It will be seen from the above that the comment concerning the narcotic potential of "Hyoscyamus" seed (meaning, in this context, the seed of Physochlaina physaloides) is absent from the Welter source and has been added by the more ethnobotanically-literate Hartwich. Welter's essay on the history of coffee unfortunately lacks a bibliography, but the source of his information is almost certainly Pallas, who makes plain that the plant intended is specifically that now known not as Hyoscyamus physaloides, but as Physochlaina physaloides. Welter and Hartwich mention, respectively, in this context "a species of henbane" and "Hyoscyamus sp."

== Chemistry ==
Physochlaina species have yielded a variety of tropane alkaloids, including not only the hyoscyamine and scopolamine present also in better-known Solanaceous genera such as Atropa, Hyoscyamus and Scopolia, but also the new (eponymous) base physochlaine, first isolated from the aerial parts of the Central Asian species Physochlaina alaica Korotkova ex Kovalevsk. Other tropanes present include apoatropine, aposcopolamine and 6-hydroxyatropine. Chinese équipe have recently studied Physochlaina physaloides for its alkaloid content, finding in the whole plant the following tropane compounds: cuscohygrine, anisodamine, L-hyoscyamine, atropine, scopolamnine, scopolamine-N-oxide, α-belladonnine, β-belladonnine.

== Westernmost species: P. orientalis ==
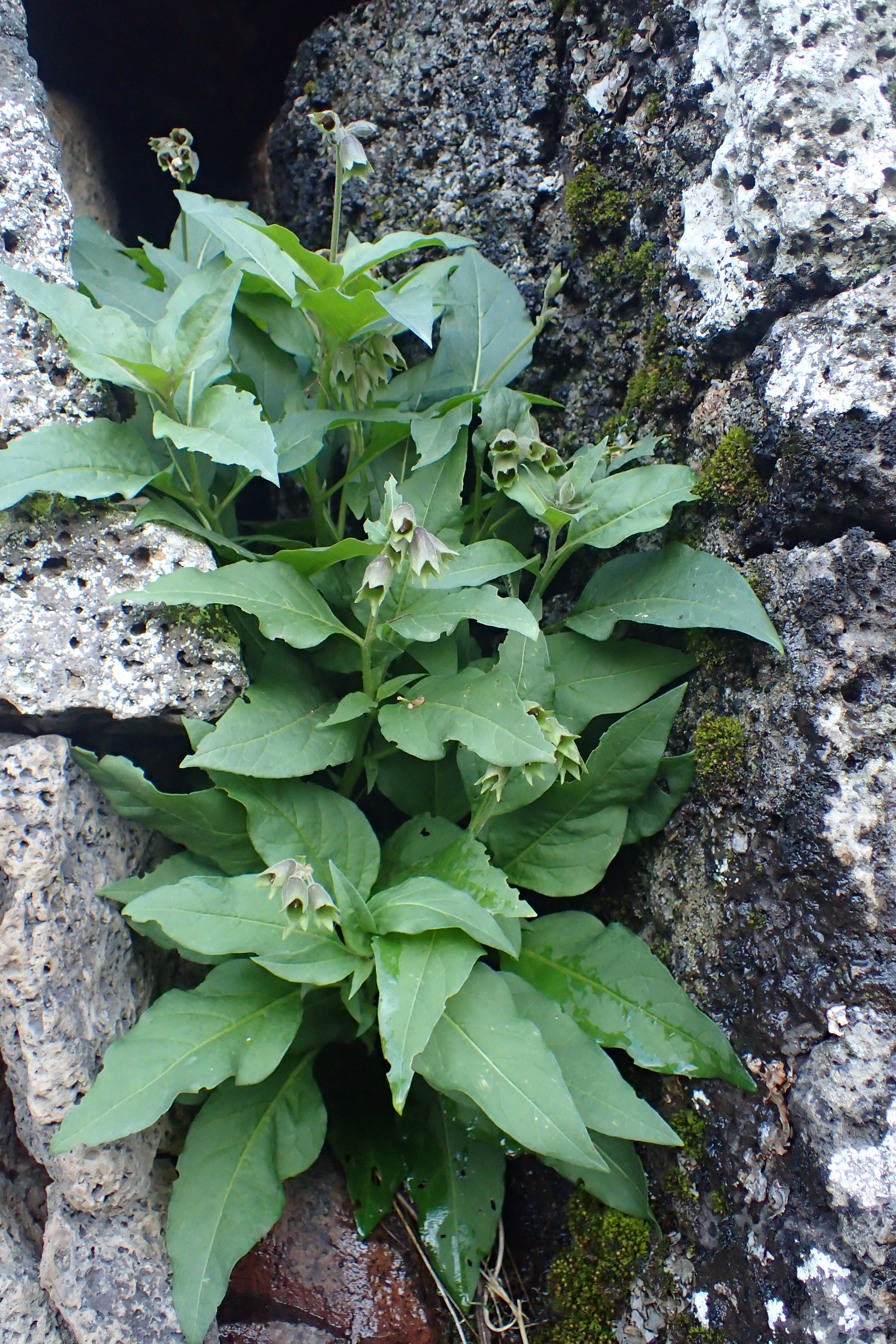
Physochlaina dubia (not, at present, a recognised species - the name referable in this instance [misidentification?] probably to P. orientalis, rather than the Himalayan P. praealta) growing and fruiting in crevices in an outcrop of vesicular volcanic rock, Akhalkalaki, Georgia (Caucasus).

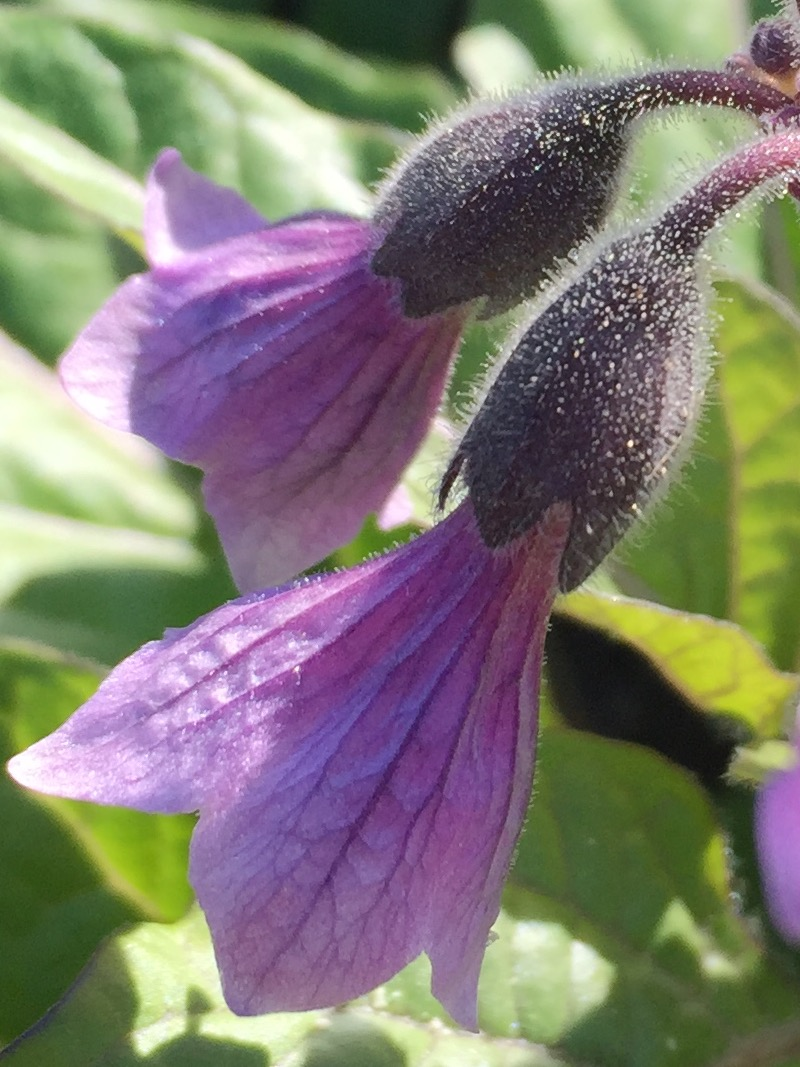
Flowers of Physochlaina orientalis in profile showing pubescent calyces

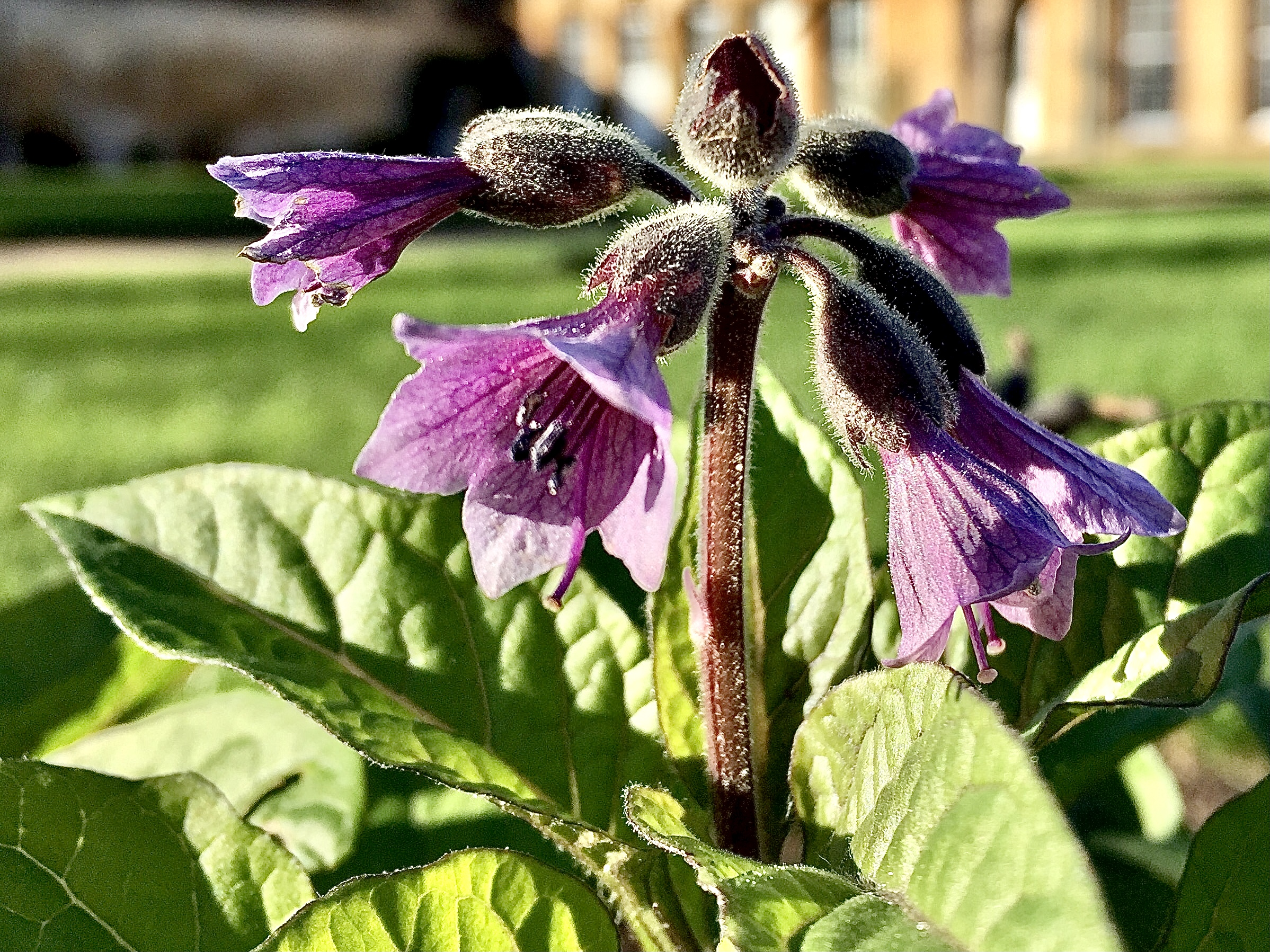
Capitate inflorescence of Physochlaina orientalis in profile

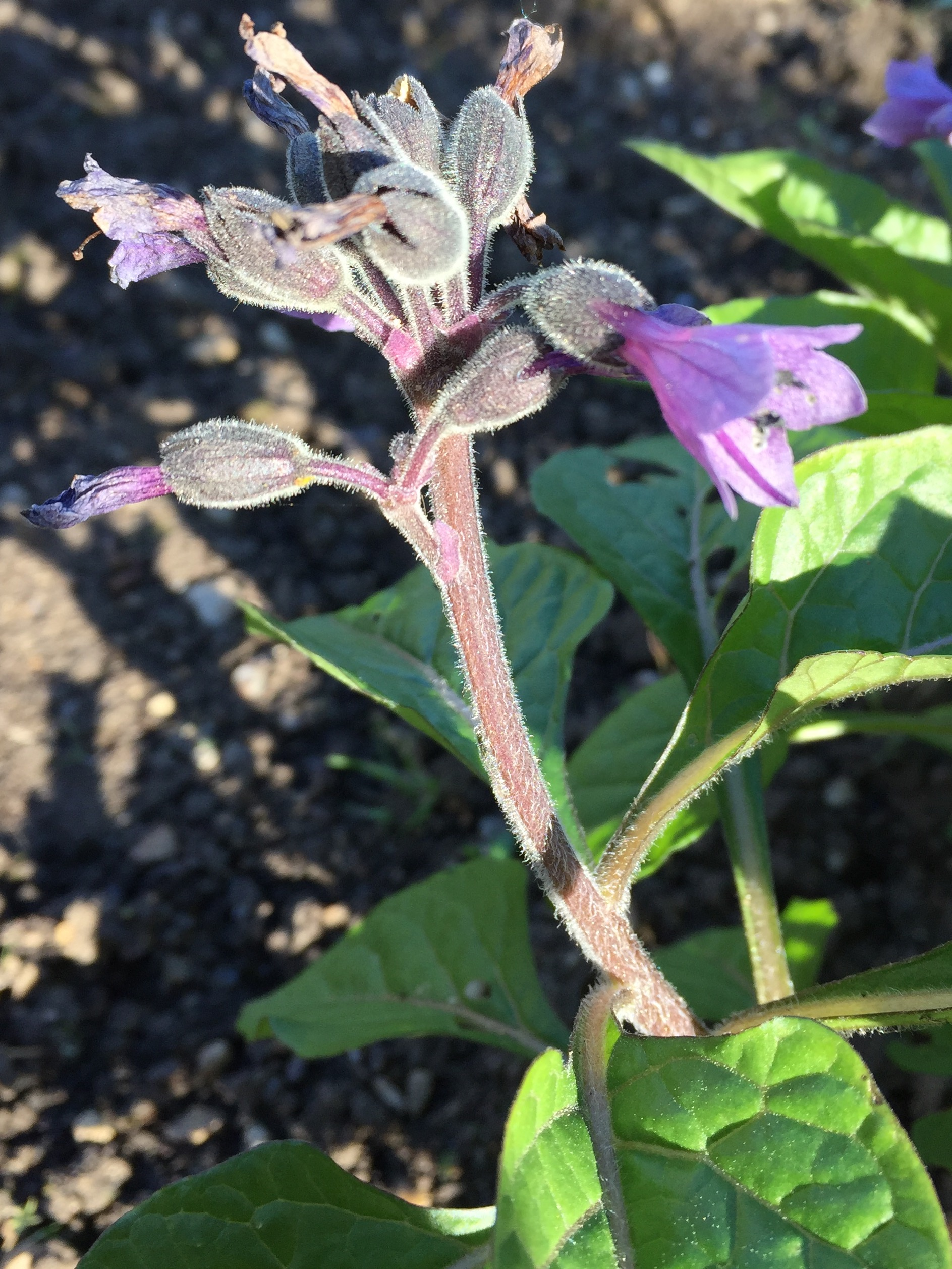
Physochlaina orientalis flowers giving way to immature fruits

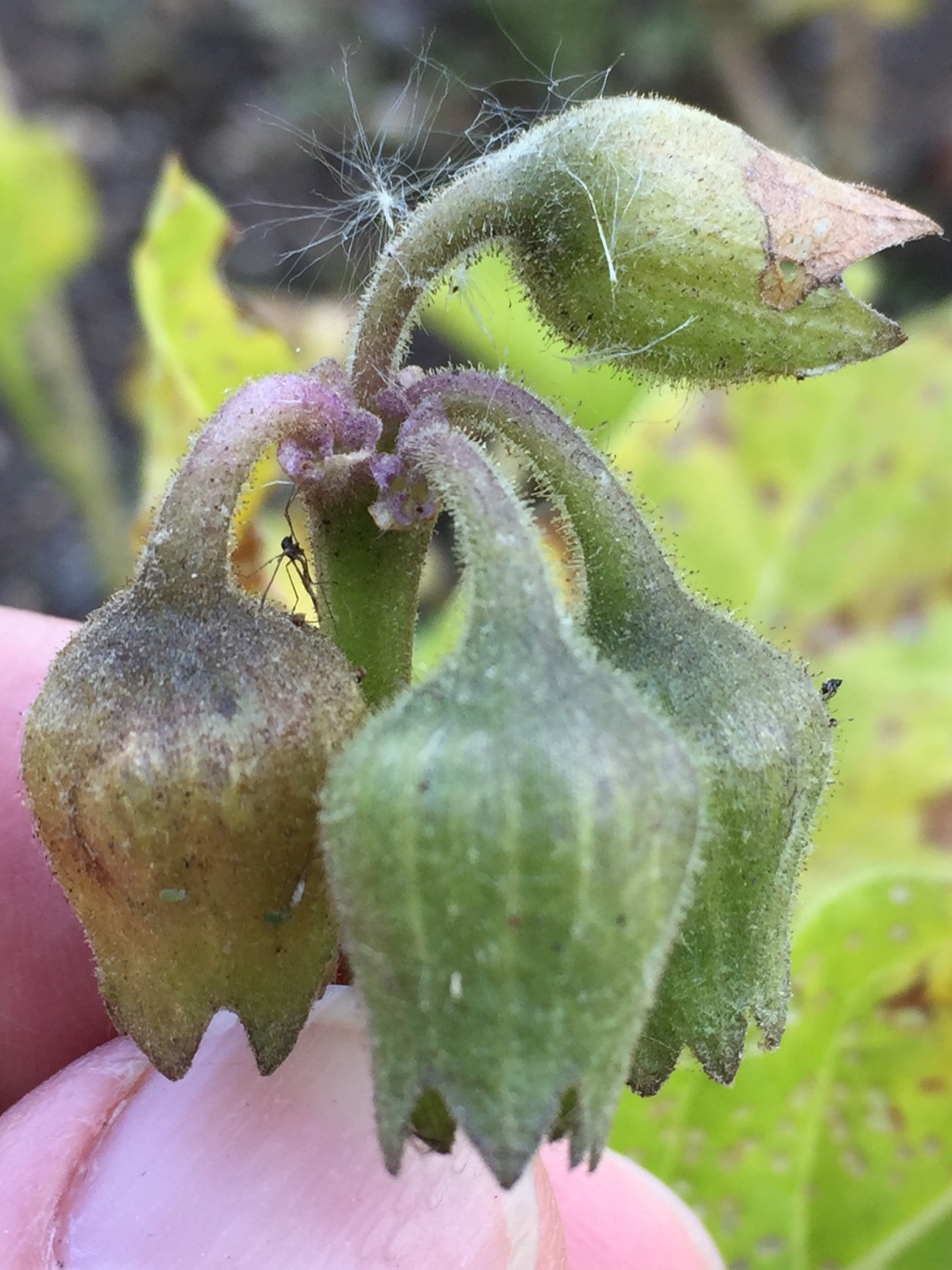
The ripe, fruiting calyces of Physochlaina orientalis (M.Bieb.) G.Don, (length circa 18 mm) showing nodding growth habit and indumentum of sticky trichomes with trapped insect remains and thistle pappus

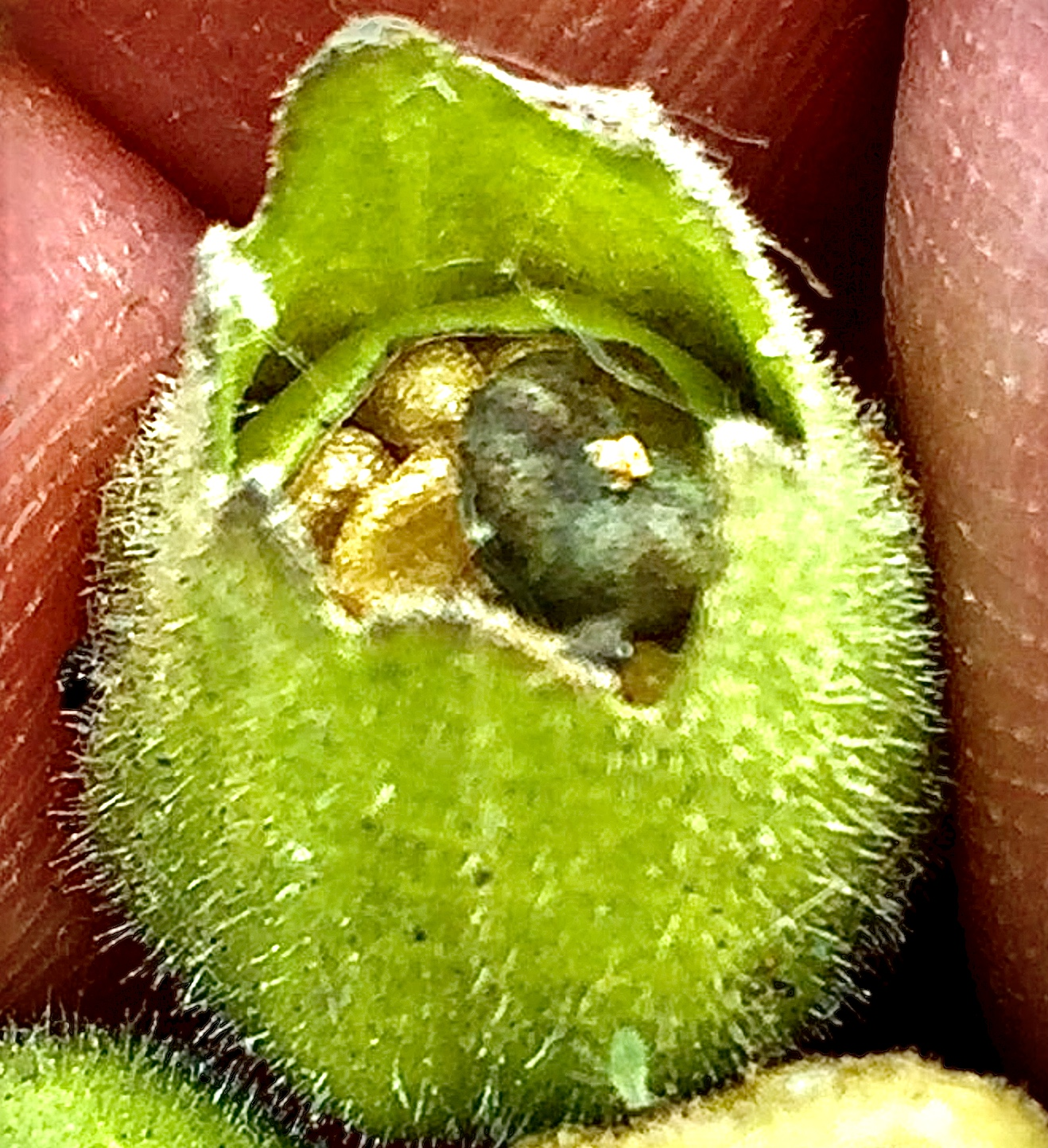
View of interior of ripe, fruiting calyx of Physochlaina orientalis (M.Bieb.) G.Don showing pyxidial capsule with detached operculum revealing yellowish-buff, pitted, reniform seeds

Habitat in cryptis circa acidulam Narzana et in Iberia. Floret primo vere. – Marschall von Bieberstein. Flora Taurico-caucasica 1808

Confusingly, the species of Physochlaina most commonly encountered in cultivation not only bears what appears to be a counter-intuitive specific name, but is also not a universally-accepted species: the plant grown as an ornamental under the name Physochlaina orientalis (M.Bieb.) G.Don, far from being (as its specific name appears to imply) the Physochlaina species with the easternmost distribution is, in fact, that with the westernmost, as it is native to eastern Turkey, southern Russia, the Caucasus and north-western Iran.

This apparent misnomer is an artifact of the plant's having initially been placed in the henbane genus Hyoscyamus as H. orientalis before the creation of the genus Physochlaina and the discovery and naming of its (Physochlaina's) species of predominantly Chinese provenance.

The plant cultivated under the name Physochlaina orientalis (referable possibly to P. physaloides – see below) is a rhizomatous, clump-forming, perennial, up to 45 cm in height, bearing attractive, funnel-shaped flowers of a pale purplish-blue, followed, in fruit, by pubescent calyces much longer than the capsules enclosed.

In cultivation in the United Kingdom it can flower between March and May, flowering usually in the month of April, when it can make a fitting companion for Spring-flowering bulbs, particularly those sharing its preference for well-drained soil – indeed its Summer dormancy, as a perennial desert ephemeral (an adaptation to drought, characteristic of Mediterranean vegetation) resembles that of many genera of bulbous plants e.g. Tulipa.

Despite its merits as a garden flower, P. orientalis is still seldom to be seen in British gardens, although it has been grown in Britain since at least 1818 – as noted by Robert Sweet:

This pretty Spring-flowering plant was raised from seed, received from Moscow, by Messrs. Whitley, Brames and Milne, at Fulham in the year 1818.

[ Note: the Fulham nursery of the above-mentioned Whitley, Brames and Milne was founded originally by Matthew Burchell (c. 1752–1828), father of the celebrated naturalist William Burchell. It was owned subsequently – in various partnerships – by nurseryman Reginald Whitley (c.1754–1835).]

In the wild, near the historic, Turkish, silver-mining town of Gümüşhane (on the westernmost edge of its range) P. orientalis is frequently to be found growing near cave mouths and in rock crevices - exactly the type of microclimate referenced by Marschall von Bieberstein in his original description of 1808, where he speaks of "grottos near the acidic mineral springs of Narzana (= Narzan Baths, Kislovodsk, North Caucasus)". (Compare also a similar penchant for growing in rock crevices on the part of the Xinjiang species Physochlaina capitata – see above).

The plant's country of origin is given in von Bieberstein's original description of 'Hyoscyamus orientalis' (now Physochlaina orientalis) as Caucasian Iberia – a former kingdom, the heartland of which is the modern Georgian province of Kartli. The Caucasian Kingdom of Iberia also encompassed parts of Armenia, Azerbaijan, southern Russia and eastern Turkey.

Flora Iranica is in agreement on this range of occurrence for P. orientalis, adding also to the list of territories not only north-western Iran but also 'Syr Darja' – the latter being referable to lands traversed by the river Syr Darya and, more especially the historic Syr-Darya Oblast and hence modern Uzbekistan. Uzbekistan lies outside the area encompassed by Flora Iranica, but parts of neighbouring Turkmenistan do not. Either way, Flora Iranica is unequivocal in describing the range of Physochlaina orientalis as extending eastward into Central Asia.

=== Physochlaina alaica - an endangered medicinal plant of Central Asia ===
In this context, it may be noted that Phillips and Rix include in their work on garden perennials a photograph of a second, (not universally accepted) Physochlaina species of unequivocally Central Asian provenance, namely P. alaica Korotk. ex Kovalevsk, recorded as growing in the Pamir-Alay, a Central Asian mountain range taking in parts not only of Uzbekistan, but also of Tajikistan and Kyrgyzstan. Physochlaina alaica differs from P. orientalis in having flowers of a beige or yellowish-buff colour and corolla 'throats' veined within in a contrasting dark brown. As is to be expected of a plant native to the Pamirs, this species is extremely hardy, if grown in dry (i.e. well-drained) conditions. Its common name in the Uzbek language is Oloy xiyoli, of which the first word Oloy signifies (like the Latin specific name alaica) "of the Alay mountains" while the second element xiyoli appears to bear some relation to the Arabic loan-word xiyol [pronounced "khiyol"] translatable possibly in this context as "short-lived" - in reference to the plant's short growing season and quick flowering as a desert ephemeral, fuelled by food reserves stored in its fleshy roots.

In her unusually well-illustrated degree paper of 2016, Uzbek ecologist Gulzira Mamatqulova of Andijan State University provides valuable information on the endangered status, habitat and continued medicinal use of Physochlaina alaica in Uzbekistan and the states adjoining it. According to her account, the plant is endemic to the Alay and Turkestan mountains of the Fergana Region (see also Fergana Valley). In this context she also mentions the Alay Ridge and the basins of the Shohimardon and Sokh rivers. [Note: there is no page "Shohimardon River" on either English or Uzbek Wikipedias, but see page Shohimardon (village)]. In neighbouring Kyrgyzstan and Tajikistan, she again mentions the Turkestan range, within which she singles out the villages of Vorukh and Khojabakkir. Habitat: the plant is to be found at altitudes between 1,800 and 2,000m, usually in the shade of rocks, bushes or juniper trees, but also in open ground. Mamatqulova estimates that there are only some 8,000 plants of this species remaining in the wild. She attributes the increasing rarity of the plant and shrinkage of its range to its over-collection (along with other local species of medicinal plant, such as Ungernia victoris) for medicinal purposes by the indigenous peoples of the area. The plant is included in the Red Book for the area, despite which no special safeguards have yet been put in place to halt its worrying decline. Physochlaina alaica has been in cultivation in the Botanical Garden of the Academy of Sciences of the Republic of Uzbekistan, Tashkent since 1973.

=== A Glimpse of the Ethnobotany of Physochlaina orientalis in the extreme NW of Iran ===
Location of West Azerbaijan and Lake Urmia in the extreme northwest of Iran

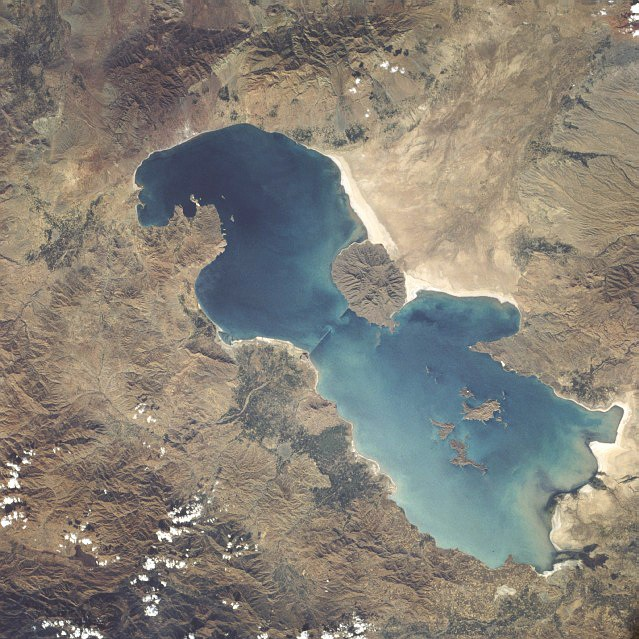
Lake Urmia and its mountainous surroundings, seen from space (Heights of Dalampir and Khoi top left)

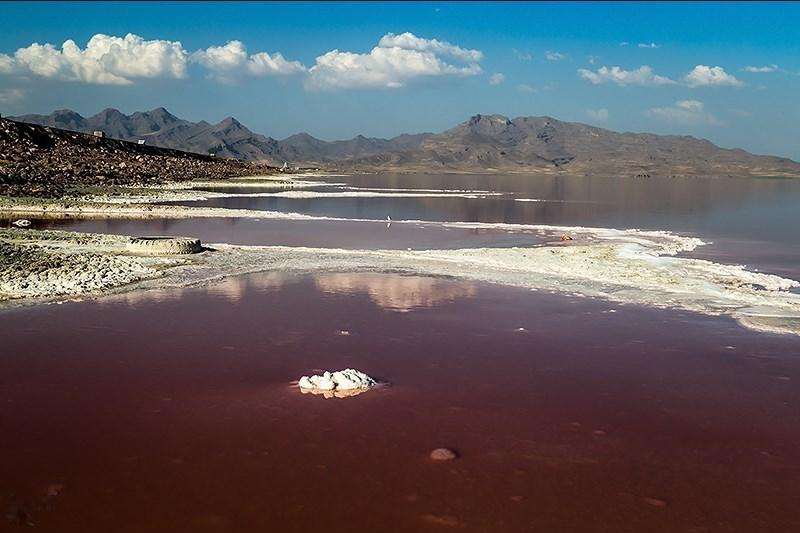
Mountain-fringed shores of Lake Urmia, West Azerbaijan, Iran

In contrast to the case of its Siberian relative Physochlaina physaloides, ethnobotanical data concerning the Western Asian P. orientalis is somewhat sparse. A recent report from Urmia County and Silvaneh District in the Iranian province of West Azerbaijan is thus of particular interest. In 2014 the Iranian Students News Agency (ISNA) published an online report from the manager of the medicinal plants group of Urmia University concerning the 'detection' of medicinal properties in two plant species of the West Azerbaijani flora - one of which was Physochlaina orientalis. The locality given for the plants in question is 'Dalampir Heights of Urmia and Khoy' but is not clear from the context whether plant material from the locality was collected and analysed for active constituents and/or information was gathered concerning the plants from a local informant with knowledge of the plants' properties. The ISNA article quotes from an interview with (Dr. ?) Abbas Siami, head of the Zarineh Khoi Institute of Higher Education in which he states the following:

Thanks to the efforts of researchers at Zarineh Khoi University, the plant Physochlaina orientalis [was found at] Khoi Heights. It was discovered 'in therapeutic use' [?] at the Heights of Dalampur, Urmia. The Urmia University Department of Medicinal Plants, in describing the therapeutic properties of the plant said: "This plant is a sedative, nerve stimulant, analgesic, poison and hallucinogen".

Transliterations of place names in the various languages of Iran from the original Perso-Arabic script forms into Latin script can often yield a confusing number of variant spellings - as is apparent in the variant forms Khoi and Khoy and the still more divergent Dalampur, Dalampir and (with a variant medial consonant as well as vowel) Dalanpar Dalanper etc. Khoy / Khoi University likely refers to the Khoy campus of Urmia University, while the Heights of Dalampur (etc.) appears to designate an area of natural beauty and Iranian domestic tourism encompassing a peak (37°9′N 44°47′E) which forms the tripoint of Iran, Iraq and Turkey, lying some 50 km from the city of Urmia.

== Cultivation of P. physaloides at Leiden: evidence furnished by an early illustration ==
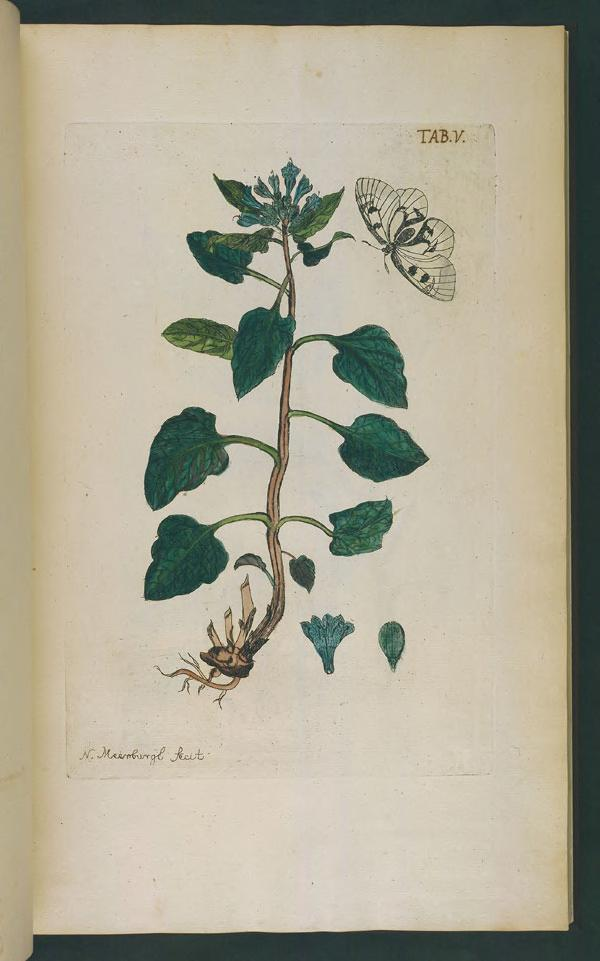
Physochlaina physaloides (listed in text as 'Hyoscyamus physalodes'): plate 5 in Afbeeldingen van zeldzaame gewassen (= 'Pictures of Rare Plants') pub. Leyden University 1775 by Nicolaas Meerburgh - who also engraved the coloured plates.

An early botanical illustration - possibly the first such to be made - of Physochlaina physaloides is that engraved by Nicolaas Meerburgh (then hortulanus (director) of the Hortus Botanicus Leiden) for his work of 1775 Afbeeldingen van zeldzaame gewassen (= 'Pictures of Rare Plants'). The drawing rendered in the engraving is a depiction of a living specimen created when the plant was in flower in the Spring - a realistic portrayal of an outlying portion of an established clump of the plant, uprooted when in full growth for the purposes of illustration, rather than during the more appropriate period (for propagation by division) of the plant's Summer dormancy. Clearly visible are the tuberous rootstock, with attached roots, and three attached dead stems (two still bearing withered scale leaves) from the previous season's aerial growth. [See image below]. Van Meerburgh is at great pains to establish in the short preface to his work the richness in rare species and impeccable Linnaean credentials of the Leiden botanic garden and the need he felt to exist to provide accurate botanical illustrations to supplement dry, botanical descriptions.

... experience had taught me daily how difficult it is to distinguish a great many plants, not hitherto well-known, one from another - even those described accurately by Linnaeus and other eminent botanists - and such descriptions may now profitably be compared with actual images of the plants: a better opportunity so to do than I have today could hardly arise, since the Botanic Garden of this University (which need bow to none other in Europe) boasts a great many beautiful species of plant, which one would be hard-pressed to find in many a garden, thanks to the great Linnaeus...and which have - so far as I am aware - been properly depicted nowhere else.

On the second page following his introduction, van Meerburgh states thus that the plant depicted in plate 5 of his work is 'Hyoscyamus physalodes' (i.e. the plant now known correctly as Physochlaina physaloides):

HYOSCYAMUS (physalodes) TAB. V.

HYOSCYAMUS (physalodes) foliis ovatis integerrimis,

calycibus inflatis subglobosis Linn. Sp. pl. p. 258

- text incorporating the description in Species Plantarum and deriving from volume one of Linnaeus's earlier work Hortus Upsaliensis of 1748, in which a binomial was assigned the plant discovered by Gmelin [see section above]. All the above noted, because of the time of year at which the Leiden specimen was drawn, no ripe fruiting calyces were available for depiction. Furthermore the flowers of the specimen display exserted pistils and stamens and the leaves have pointed tips and sinuate margins - all of which suggest an identity compatible more with the Caucasian Physochlaina orientalis rather than the Siberian P. physaloides. The question could be resolved by recourse to actual plant material held (or grown) by the herbarium and/or garden of Lieden's Hortus Botanicus at the present time.

[Note: the butterfly species depicted in the plate is a Parnassius - possibly Parnassius mnemosyne, the Clouded Apollo].

== Physochlaina physaloides and P. orientalis ==
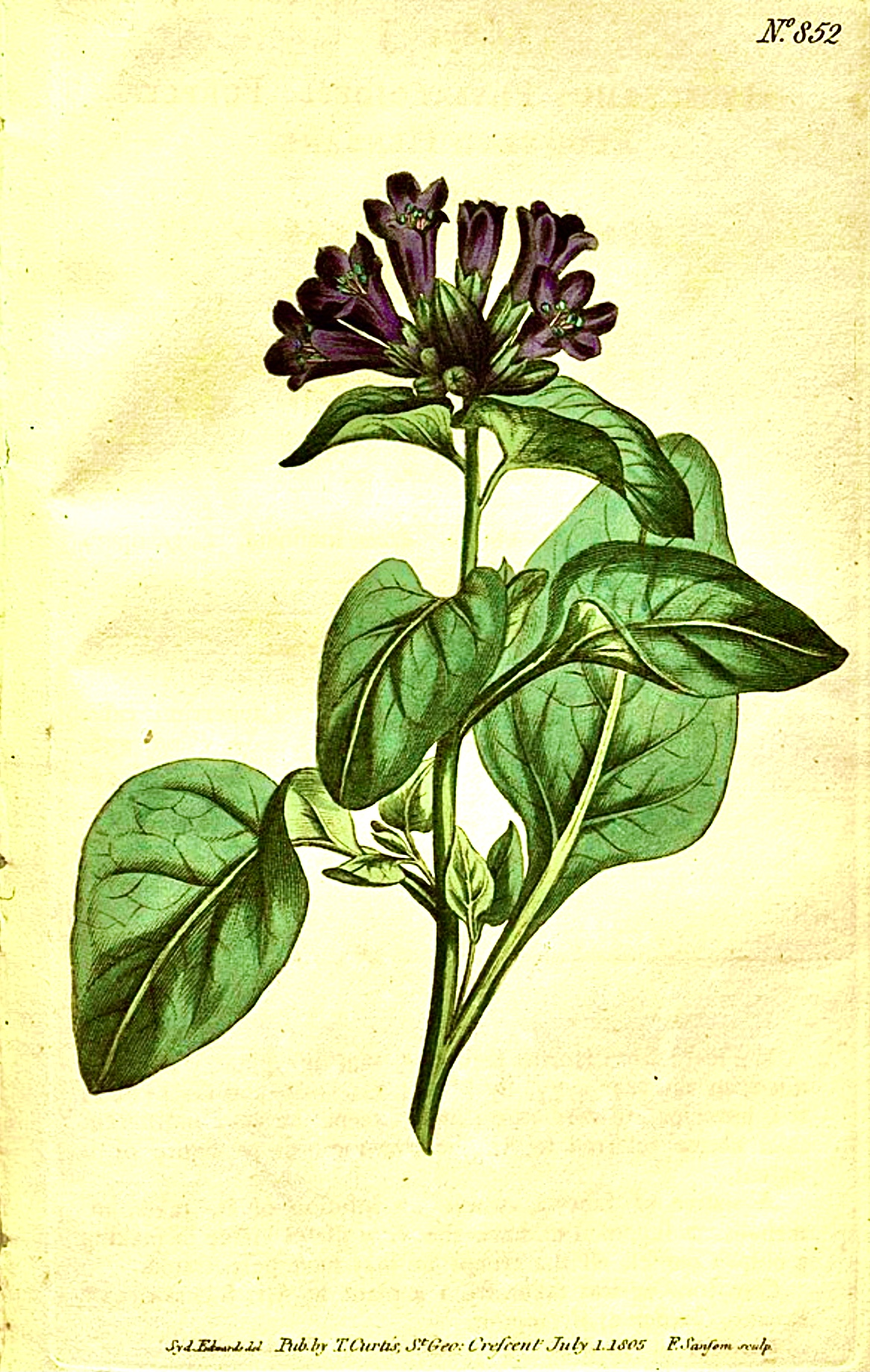
Physochlaina physaloides in Curtis's Botanical Magazine, 1805 (No. 852) (8469918743). Coloured plate engraved by the talented but poorly-known botanical illustrator F. Sansom (a.k.a. T. Sansom).

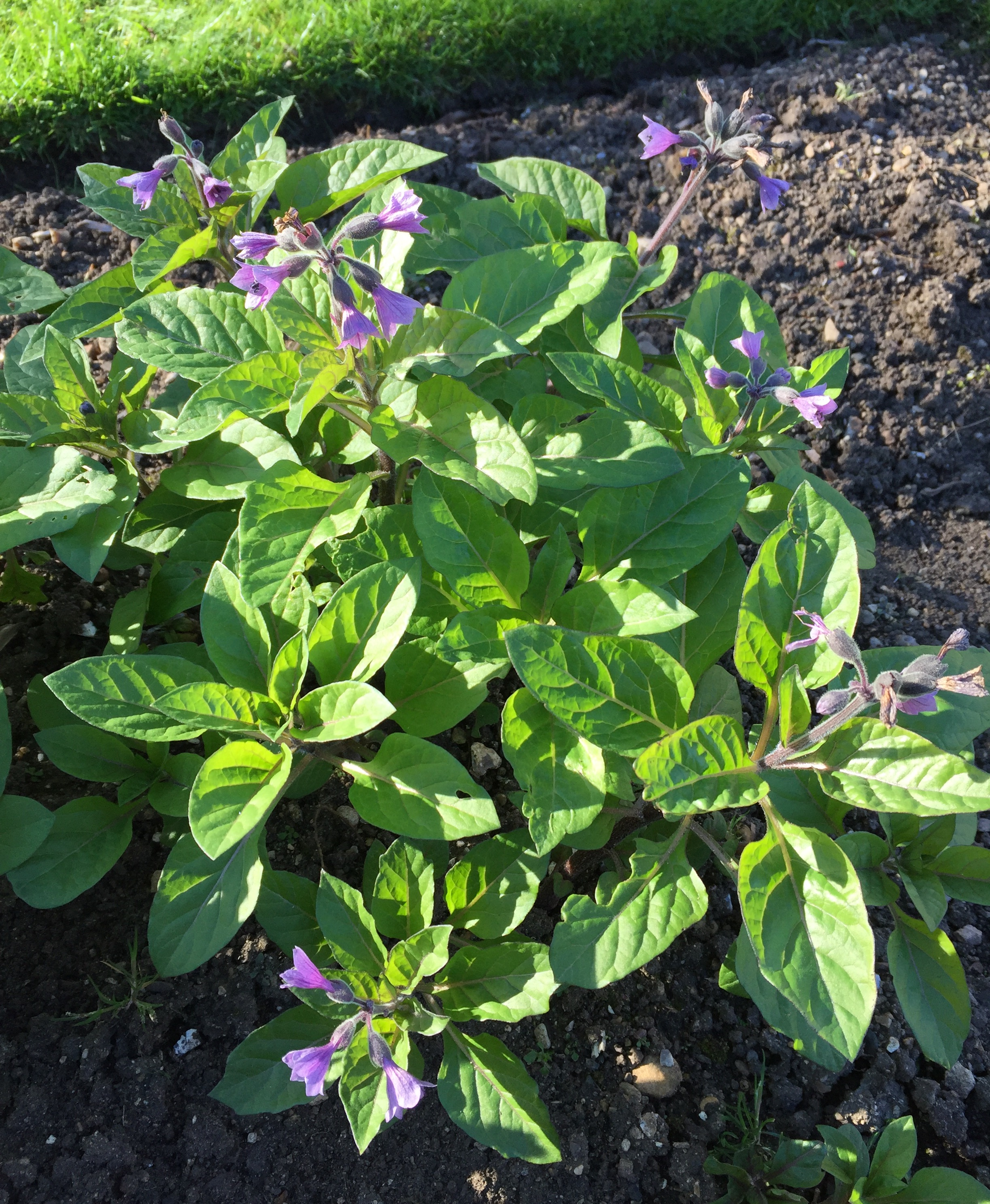
P. orientalis flowering in Oxford Botanic Garden on 25 March 2017

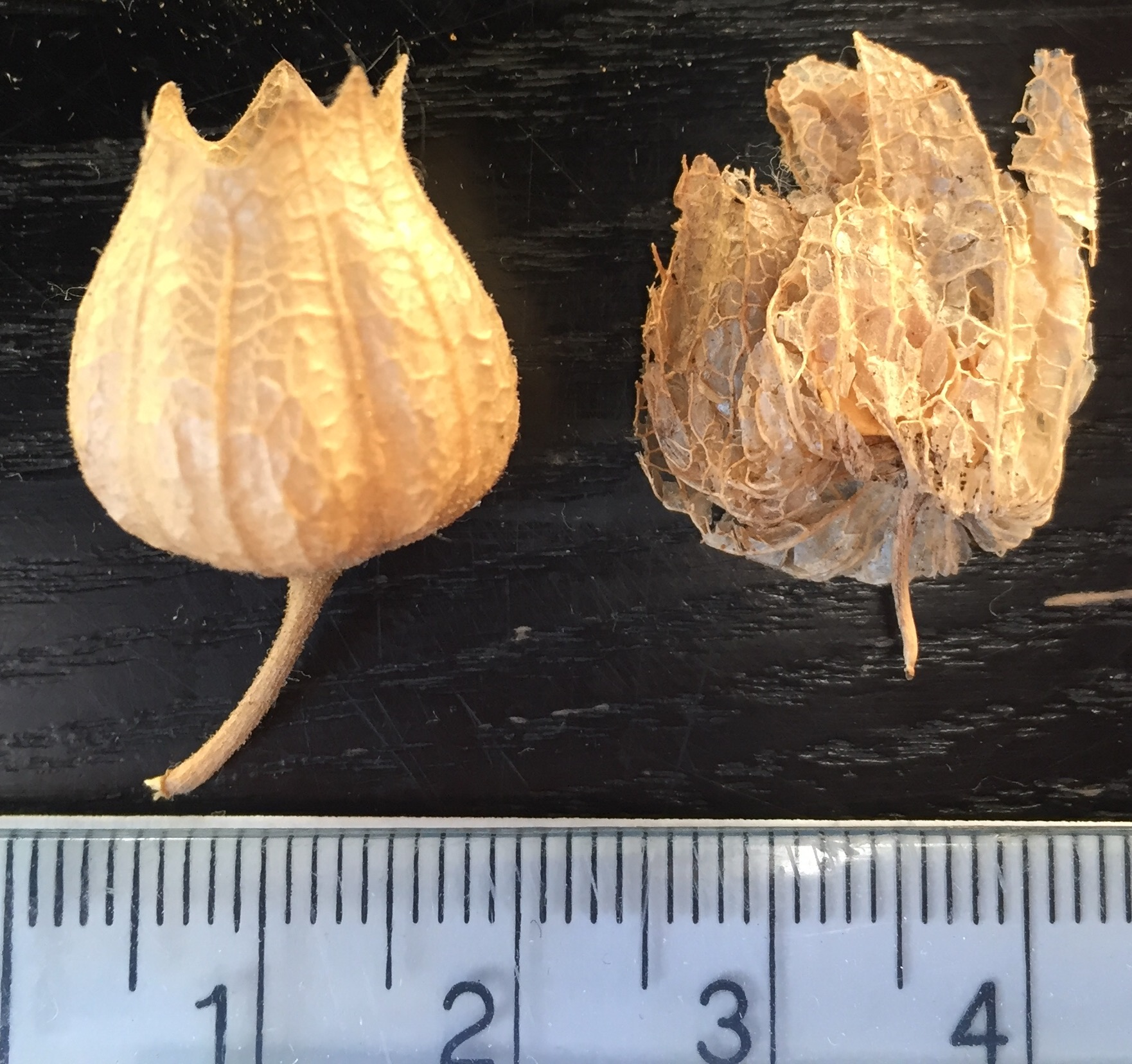
Contrast between ripe fruiting calyces of P. orientalis and P. physaloides - marked enough probably to justify maintaining these as distinct species: calyx of P. orientalis resembles a squat, pyriform version of the (rigid) fruiting calyx of Hyoscyamus, while that of P. physaloides resembles (as the specific name suggests) the (papery / bladder-like) fruiting calyx of Physalis.

George Don notes of Physochlaina orientalis in his 'A General History... ' entry on his new genus:

This is very like P. physaloides; but differs in the higher stature, and more robust habit; in the herb being pale green, and more downy; the calyx being longer; and in the tube of the corolla widening gradually to the top; in the genitals being usually exserted; and in the calyx being less inflated, and hardly twice as long as the capsule.

Height, robustness and also, to an extent, stem and foliage colour being omitted from the discussion as functions of genetic strain, habitat and nutrition, one is left with relative pubescence, flower shape, exsertion of style and stamens and length and degree of inflation of the fruiting calyx as means of differentiating Don's original two species. To this list may be added the texture of the respective fruiting calyces - as referenced in the common names in Russian of the two species [see above].

If Physochlaina orientalis were to be demoted to a subspecies of P. physaloides, one would be left with a single, rather variable species, found over an immense range stretching thousands of kilometers from Eastern Turkey through Iran, Central Asia, China and Mongolia all the way to southeastern Siberia.

Given the Central Asiatic provenance of the not-universally-accepted species Physochlaina alaica and P. semenowii and the assertion in Flora Iranica that P. orientalis may be found in Central Asia, it may be that more than one Physochlaina species will be subsumed in the concept of a variable and very wide-ranging P. physaloides.

Such variability and wide distribution bear comparison with those of a much better-known Solanaceous plant: Atropa belladonna, which a consultation of the literature will reveal to have acquired a relatively large number of specific and subspecific names now largely reduced to synonymy with A. belladonna as local varieties of a single very variable species found from the U.K. in the West to northern Iran in the East.

== Gallery I ==
Shoot development and anthesis in Physochlaina orientalis

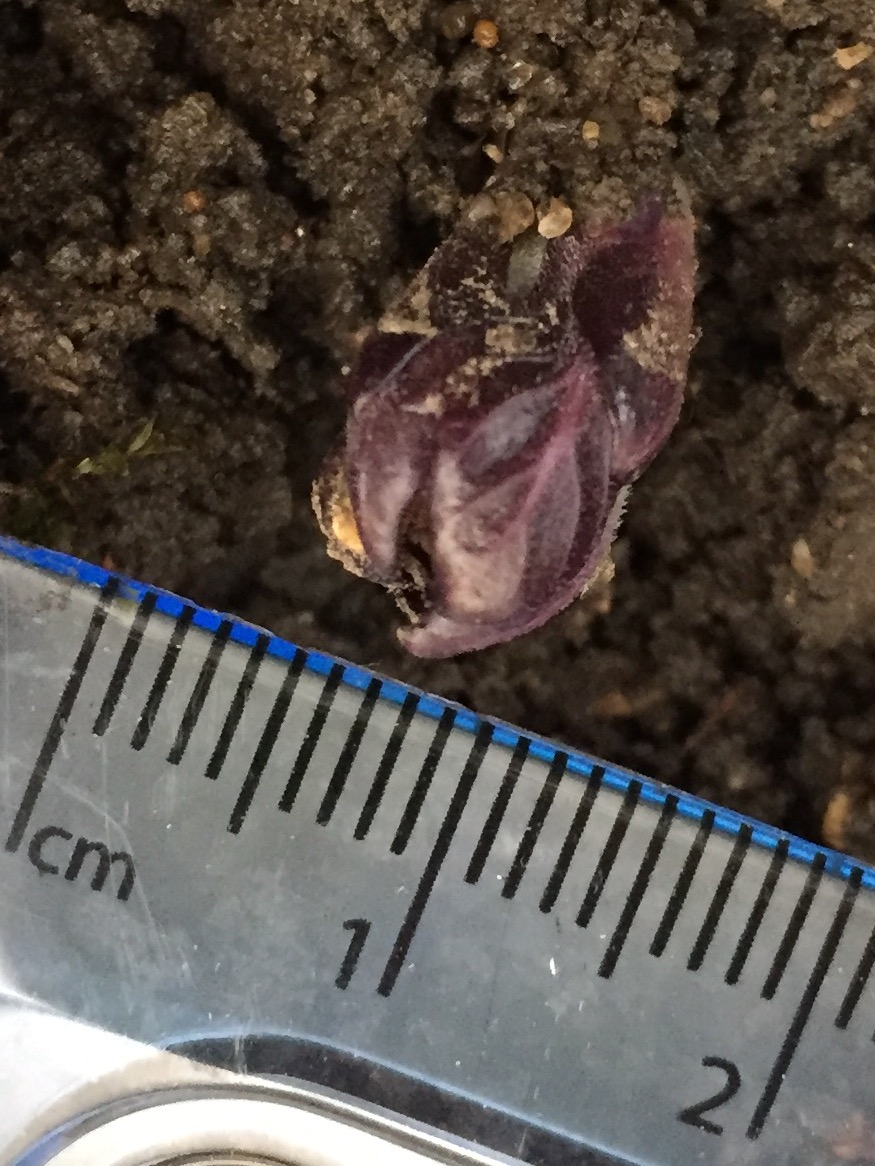
Physochlaina orientalis shoot from tuberous rootstock at first emergence from soil, showing strong, purple pigmentation of new growth.

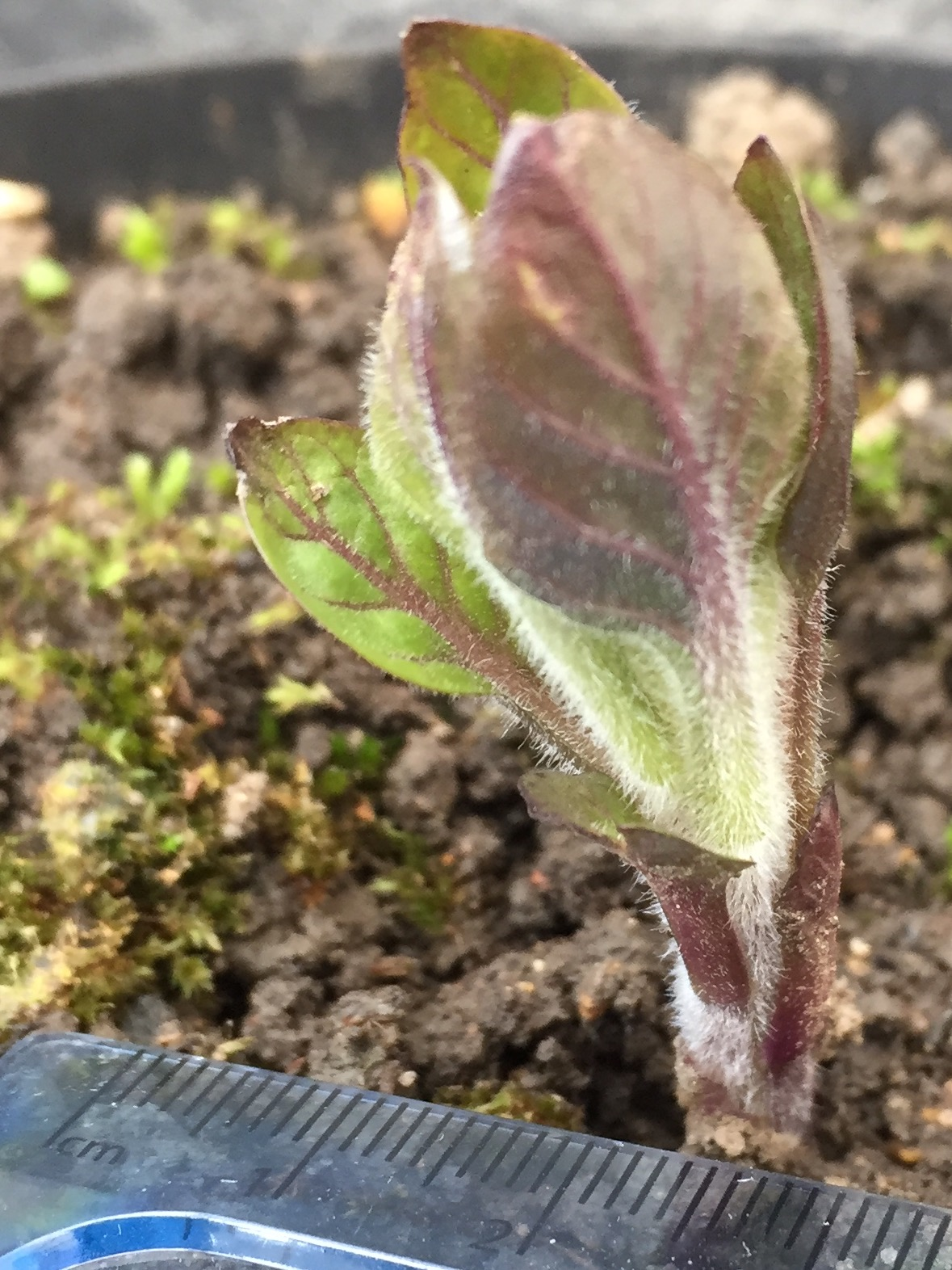
Physochlaina orientalis: same shoot after four days displaying silvery pubescence and purple venation of young foliage

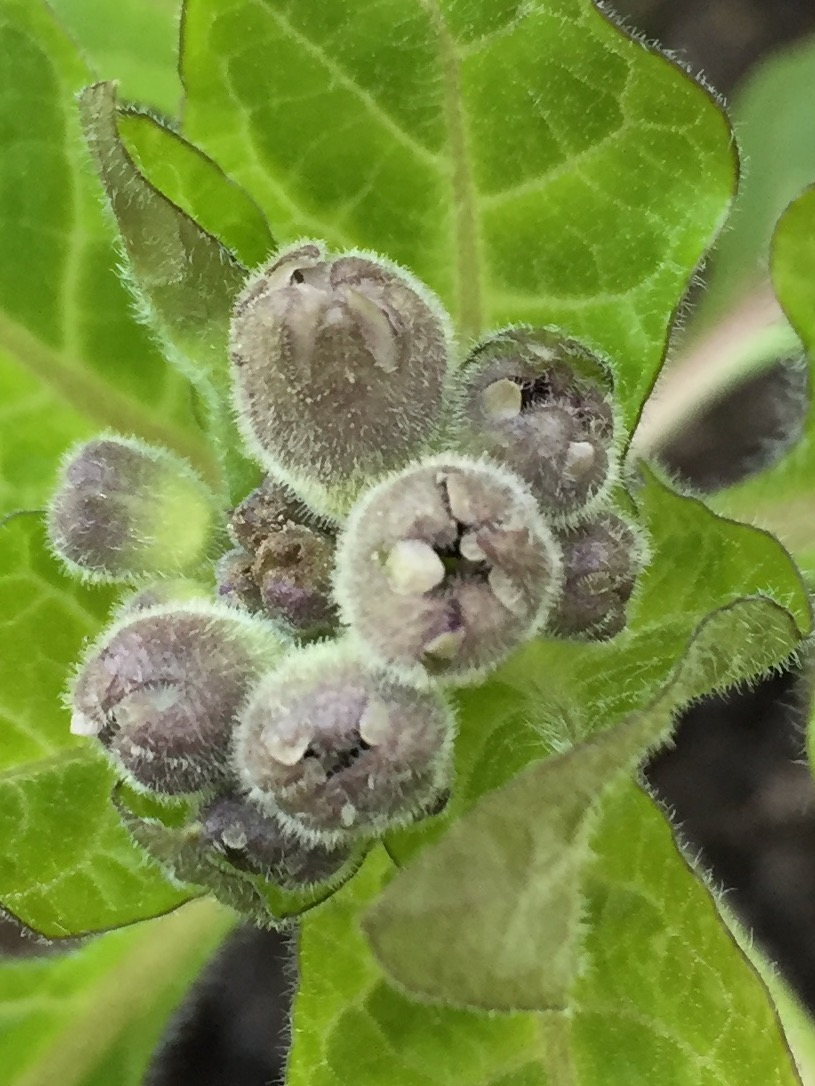
Physochlaina orientalis: same shoot after nine days, bearing developing flower buds displaying imbricate corolla aestivation

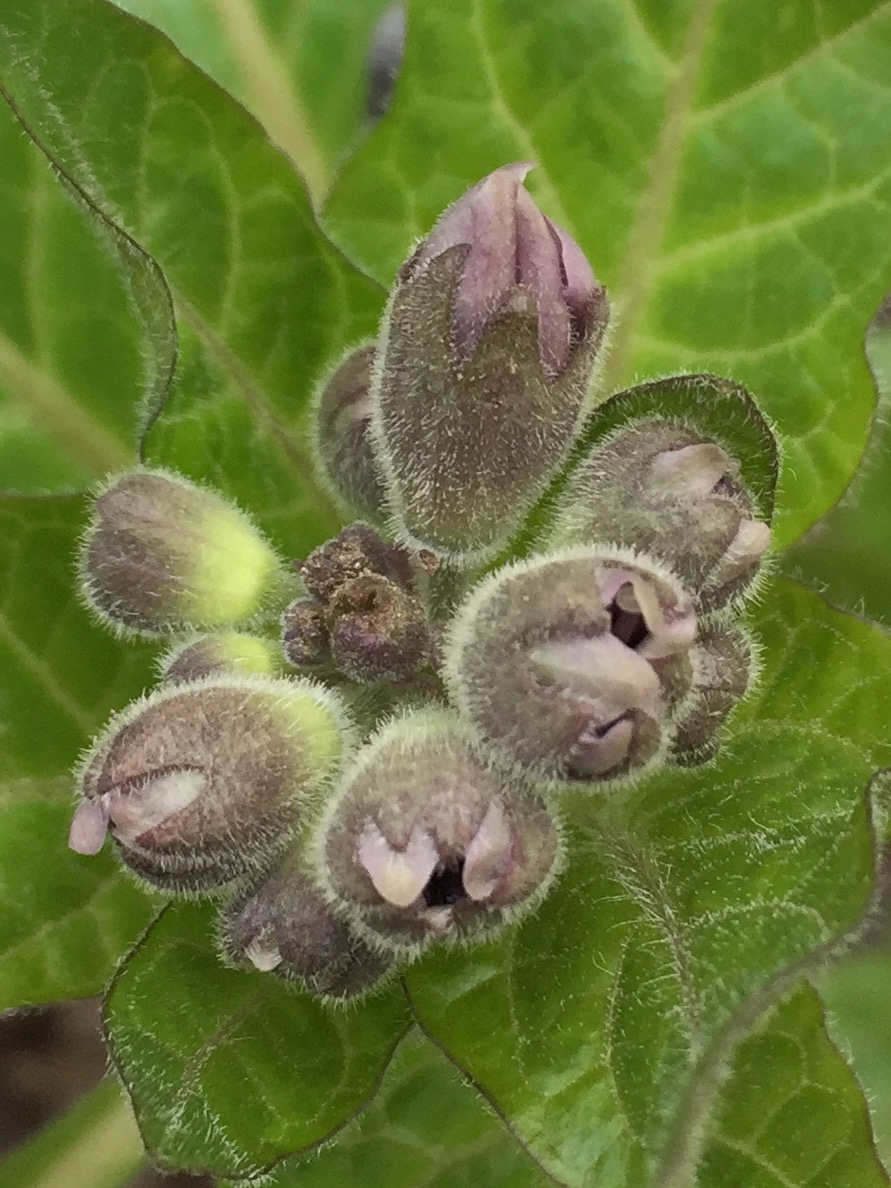
Physochlaina orientalis shoot (ten days) emergent corollae displaying incipient purple pigmentation

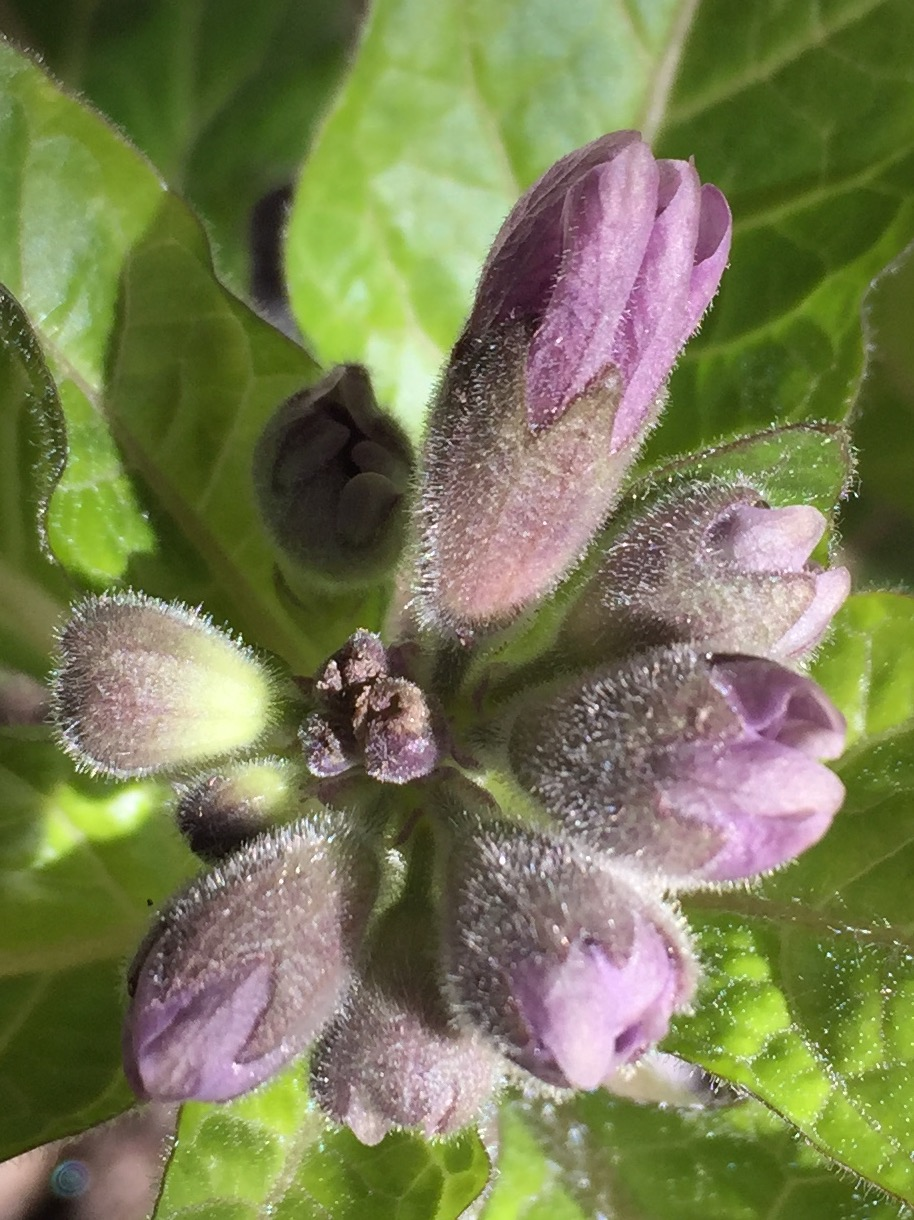
Physochlaina orientalis shoot (eleven days) emergent corollae fully pigmented

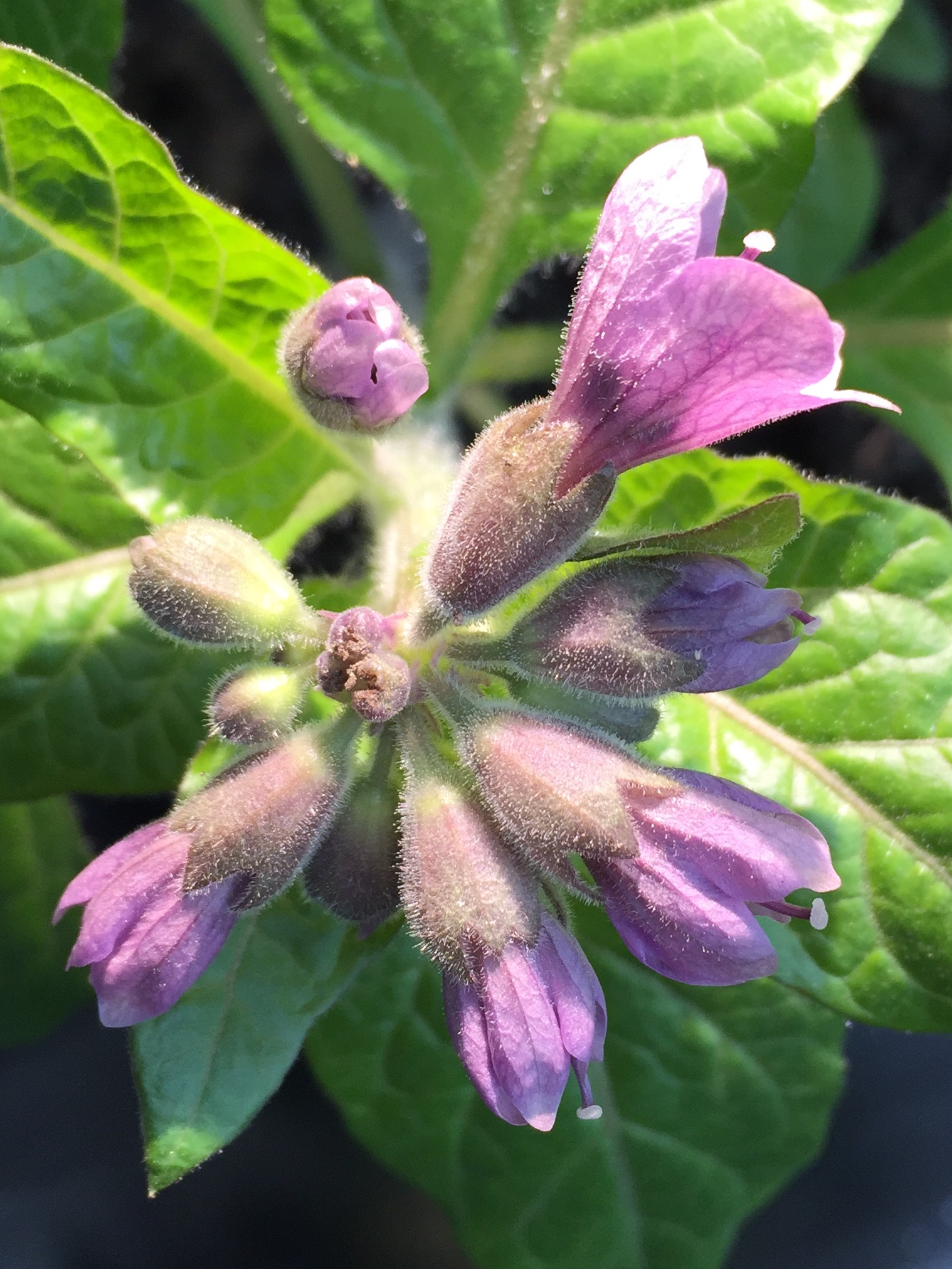
Physochlaina orientalis shoot (twelve days) corollae unfurl to reveal contrasting purple styles and white stigmas.

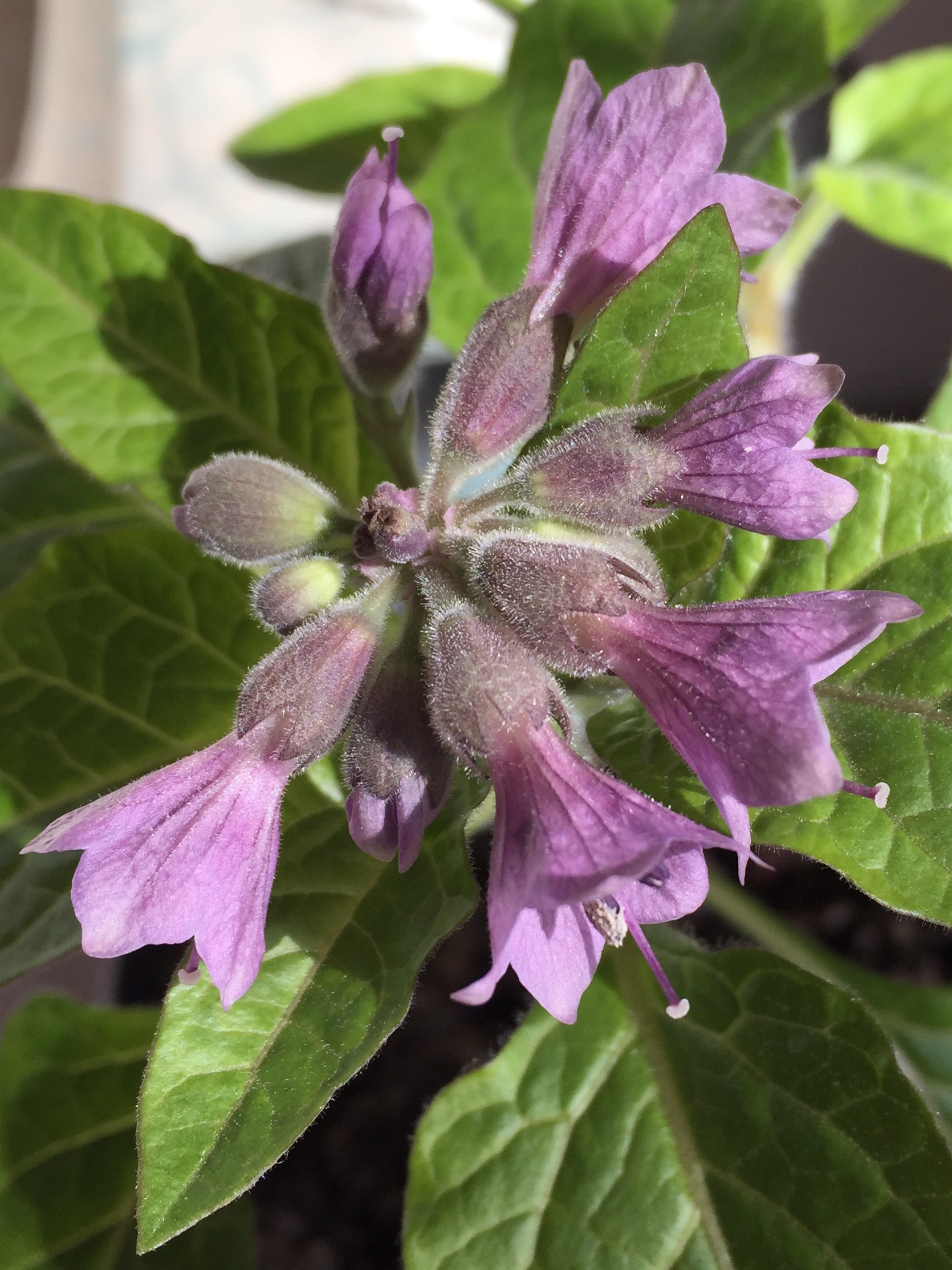
Physochlaina orientalis shoot (thirteen days) Majority of corollae now fully mature and infundibuliform.

== Gallery II ==
Fruiting calyces

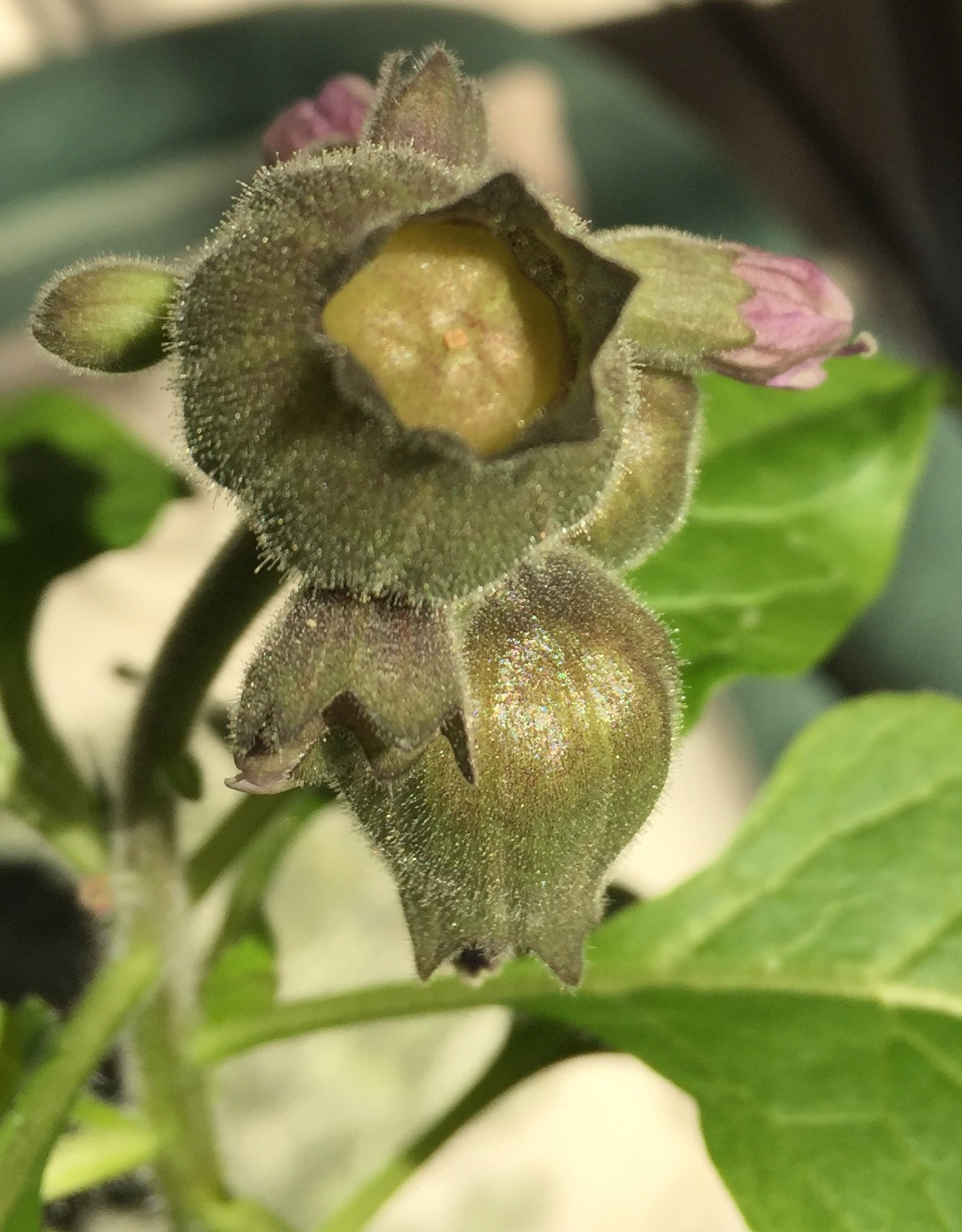
Close-up of mature fruiting calyces of Physochlaina orientalis, one angled to show operculum within, shortly before dehiscence of pyxidial seed capsule. Cultivated plant, U.K.

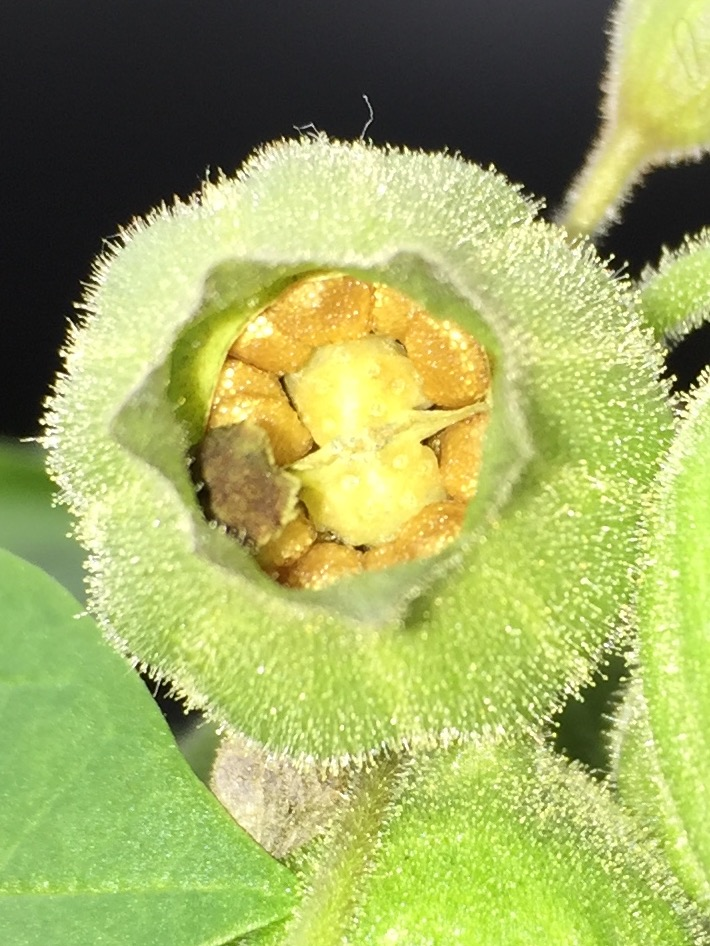
Physochlaina orientalis: single dehiscent fruiting calyx after withering of operculum (still attached to edge of capsule), with enough seeds fallen to reveal axile placentation. Cultivated plant, U.K.

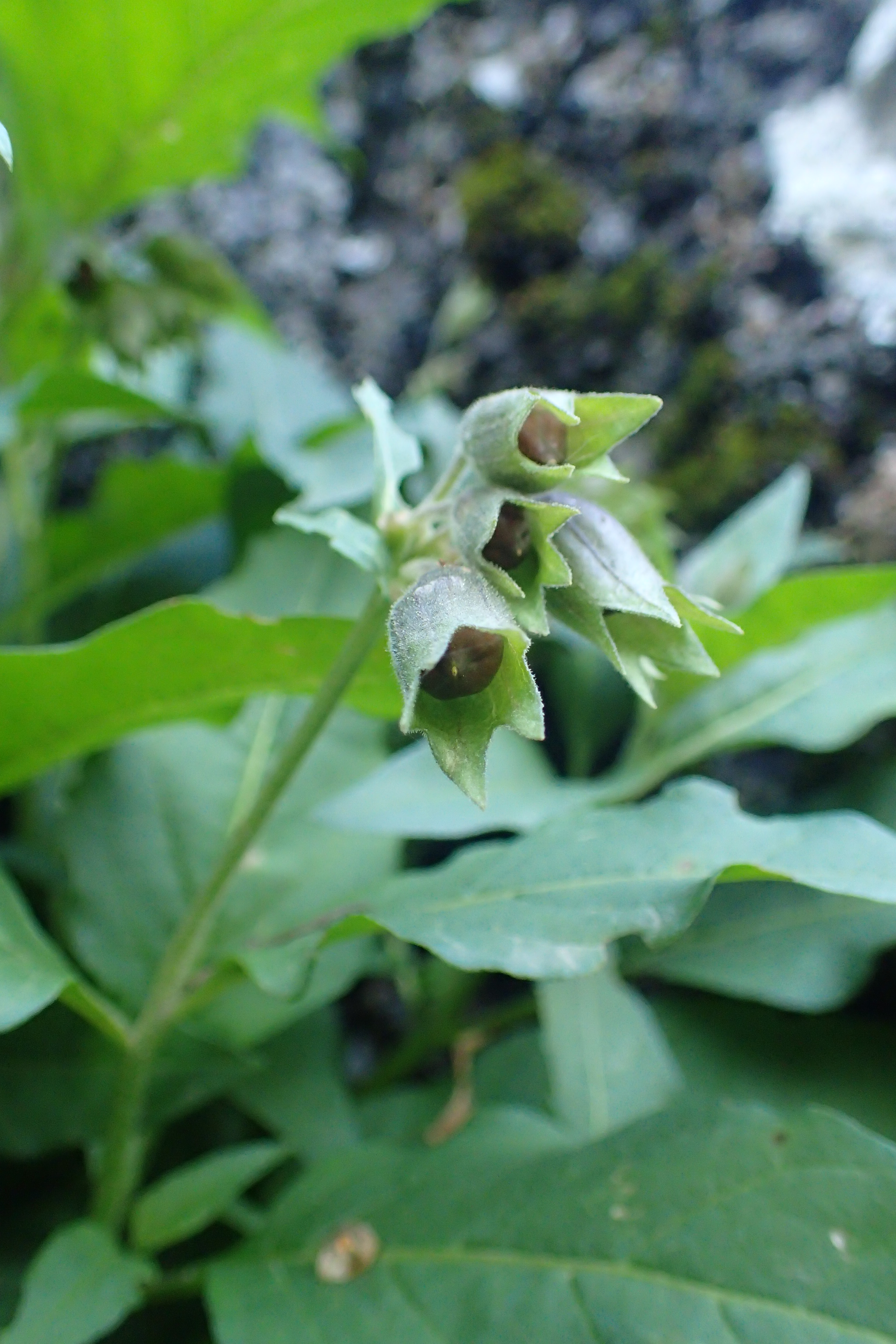
Physochlaina sp. (referable probably to P. orientalis) Akhalkalaki, southern Georgia: close-up of fruiting calyces, showing opercula (=lids) of pyxidial capsules

== Gallery III ==
Venation

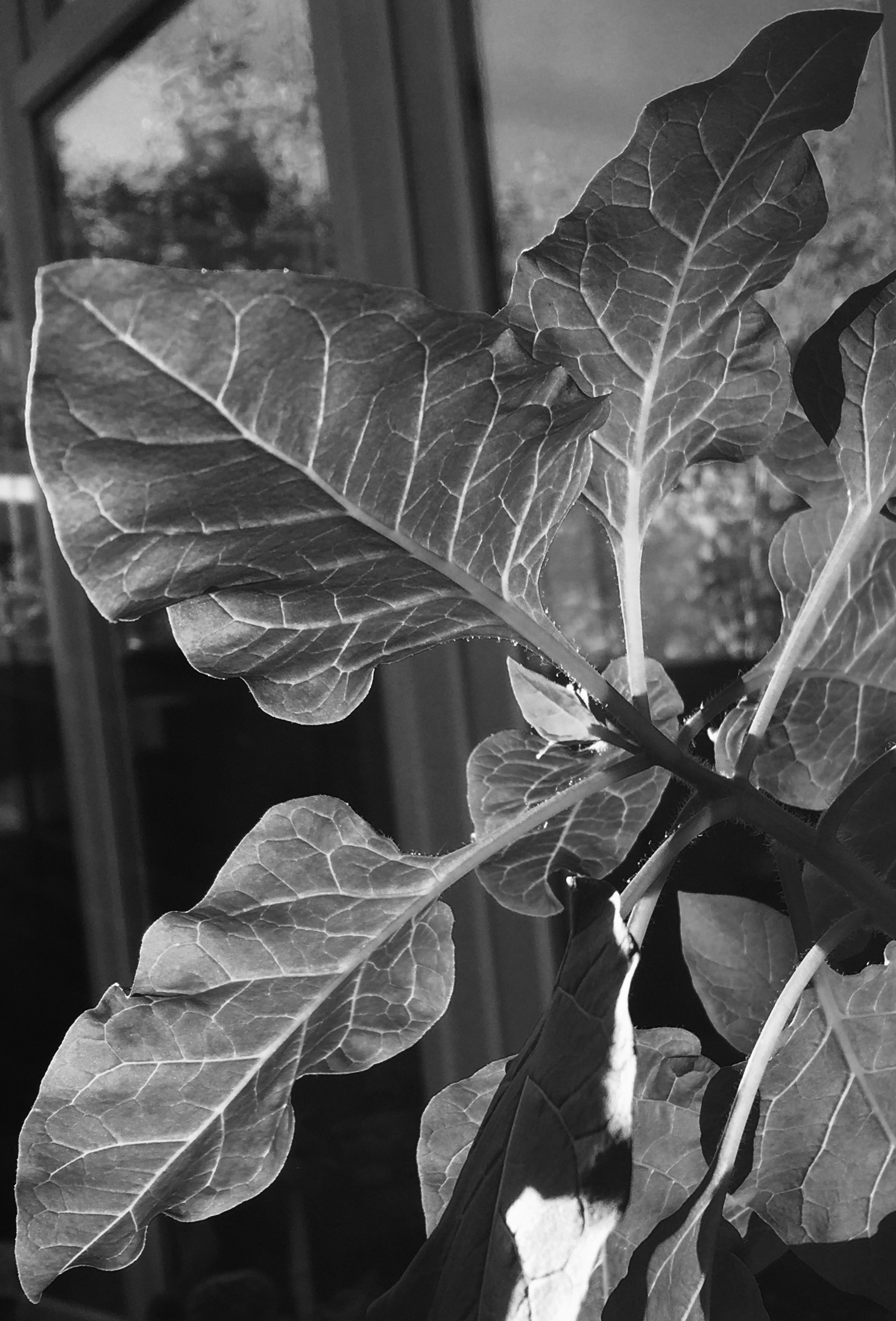
Physochlaina orientalis: foliage back-lit and B&W filter applied to image to highlight venation

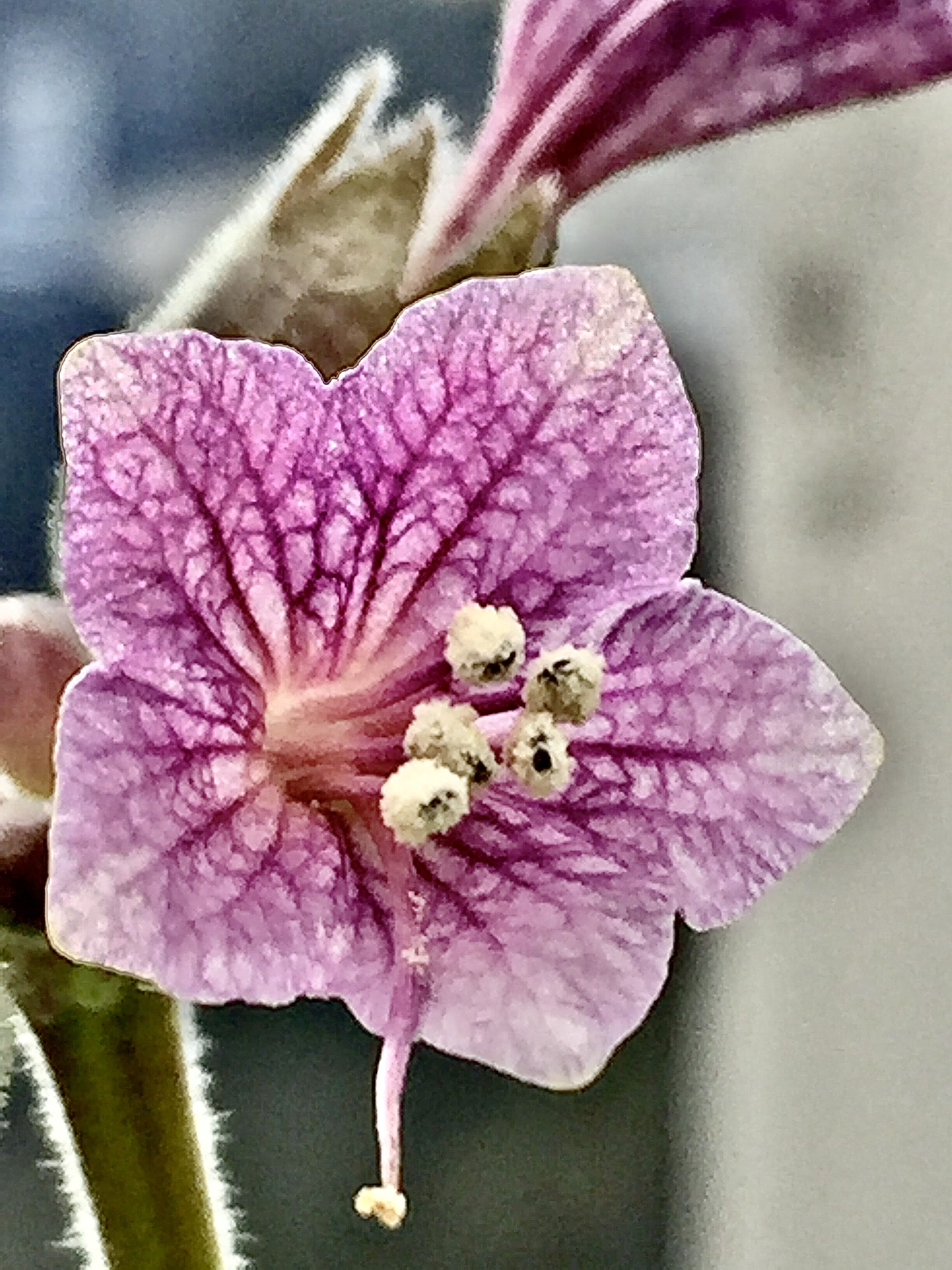
Physochlaina orientalis: detail of corolla venation in a single senescent (post-pollination) flower - note ripe anthers and wilted pistil.

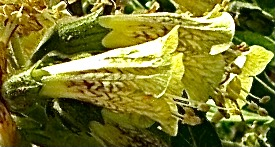
Physochlaina praealta: detail of calyx and brown corolla venation, cropped from a larger image

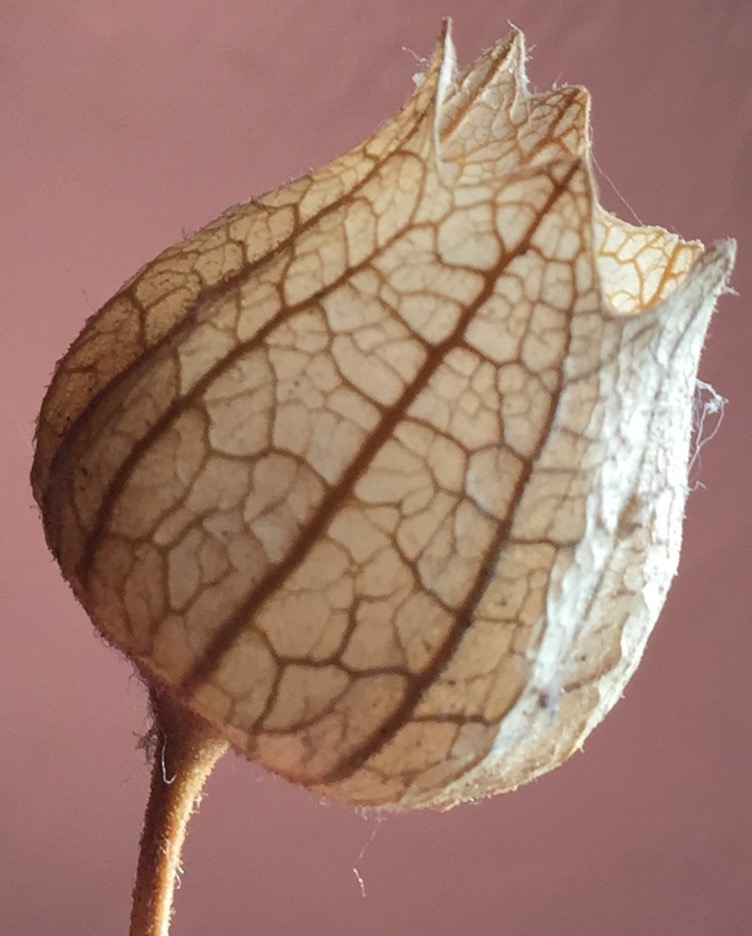
Physochlaina orientalis: fallen, empty, dry, fruiting calyx, back-lit by sunlight to reveal venation

== Gallery IV ==
Habitats

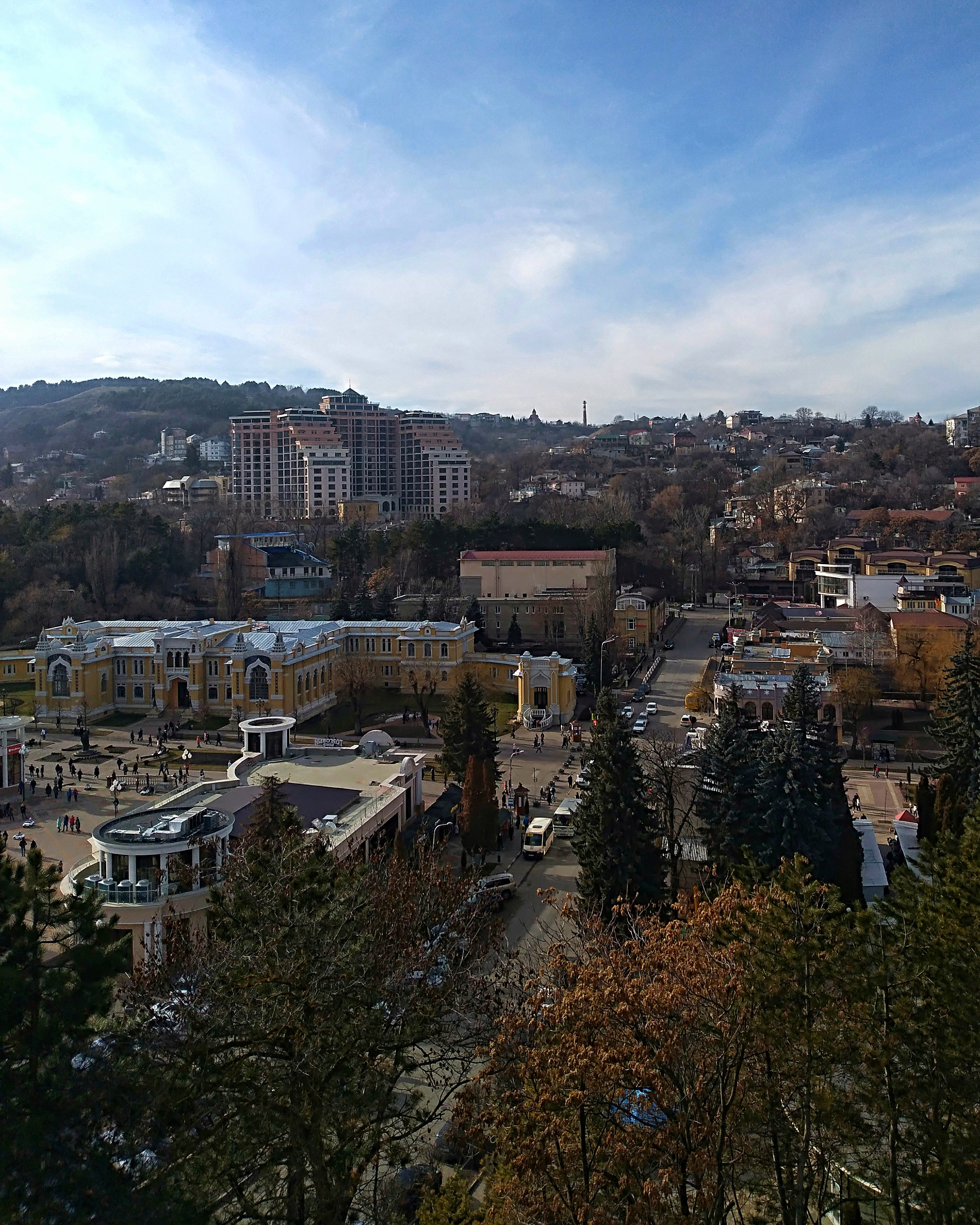
Narzan spa complex, Kislovodsk, North Caucasus: type locality for Physochlaina orientalis

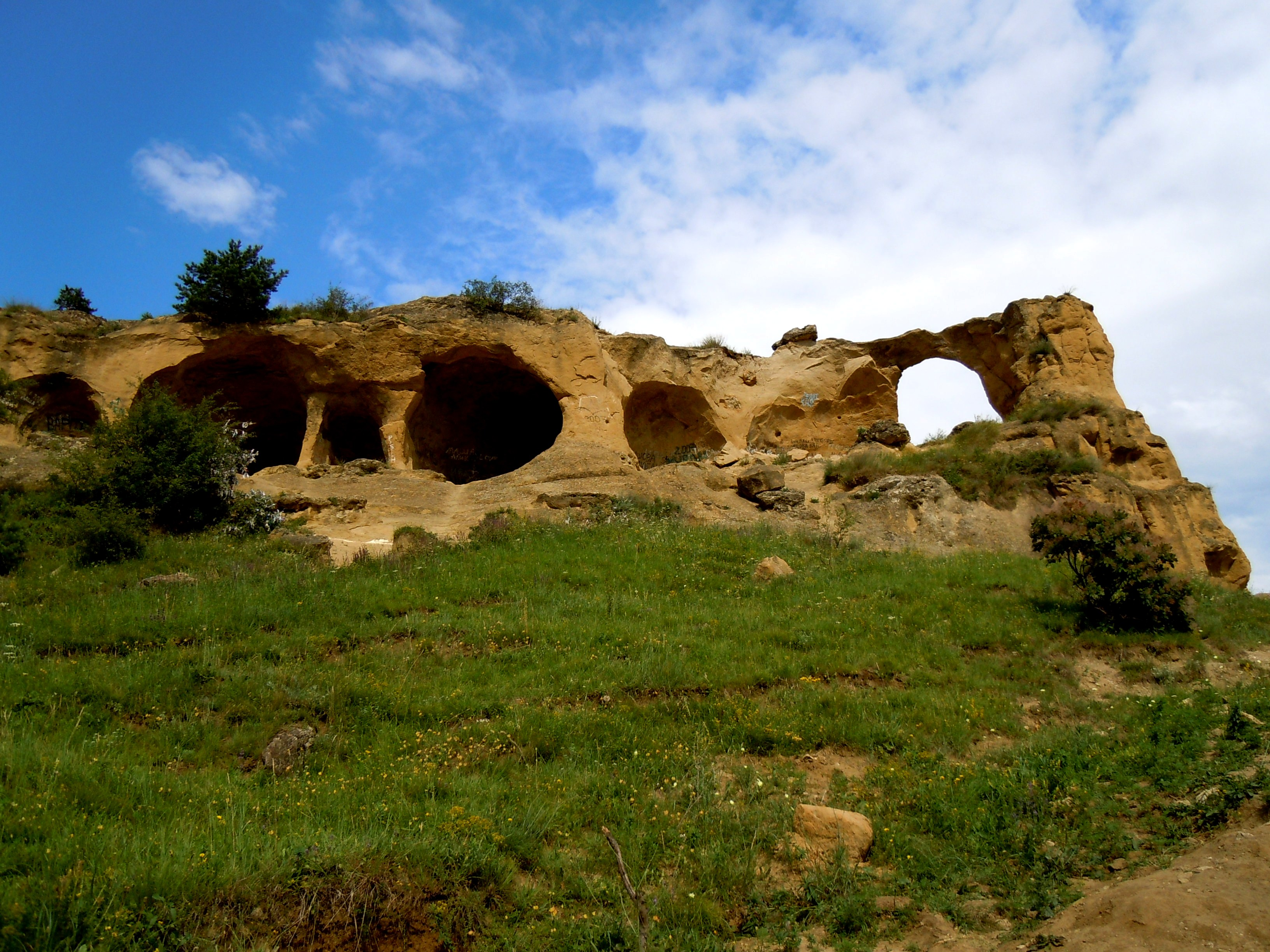
Cave mouths and natural arch on Koltso-gora (= 'Ring Mountain') overlooking Kislovodsk (re. P. orientalis)

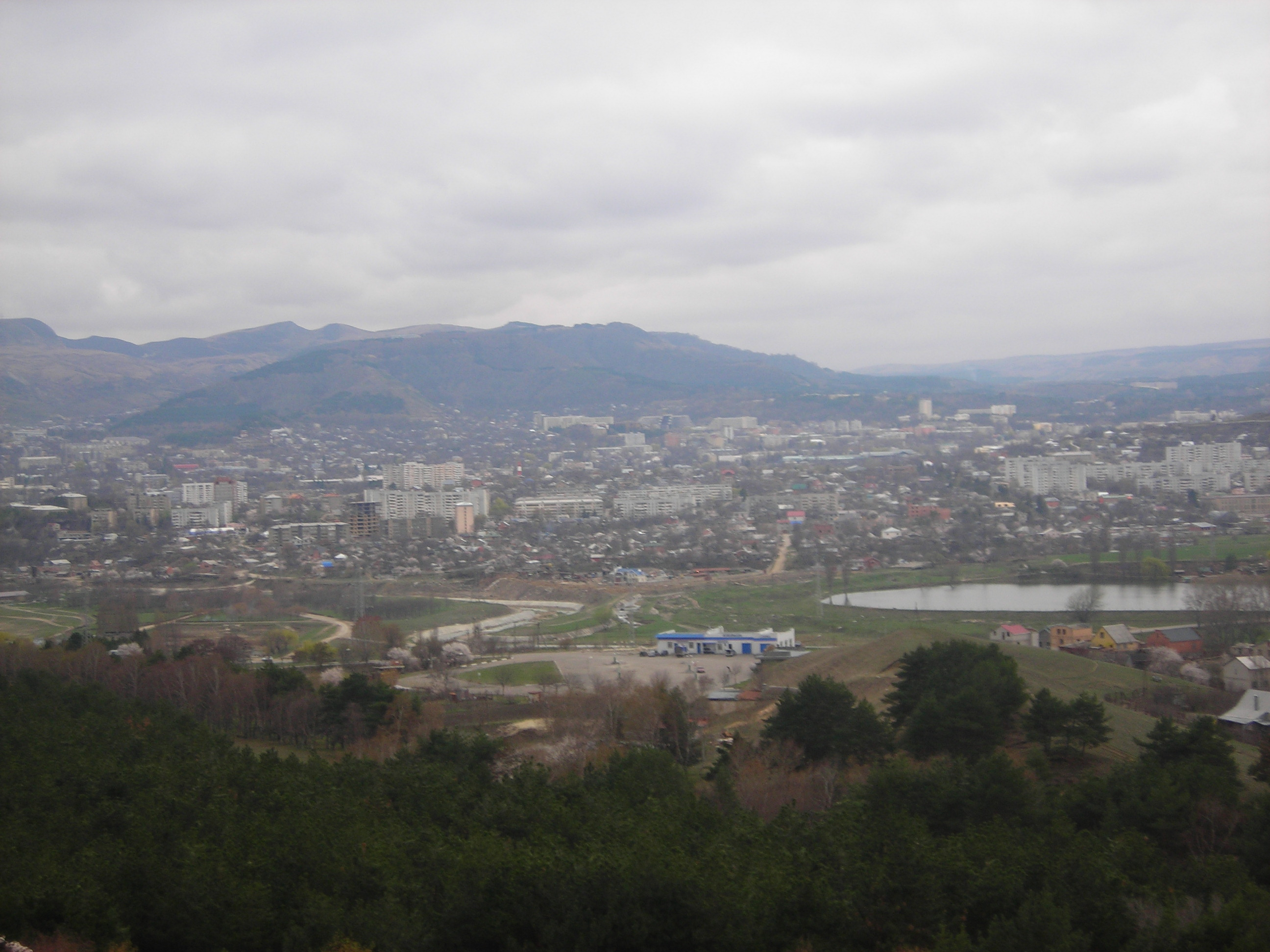
Wooded hills of Kislovodsk (= 'Sour-water-town'), viewed from summit of Mount Koltso (re. P. orientalis)

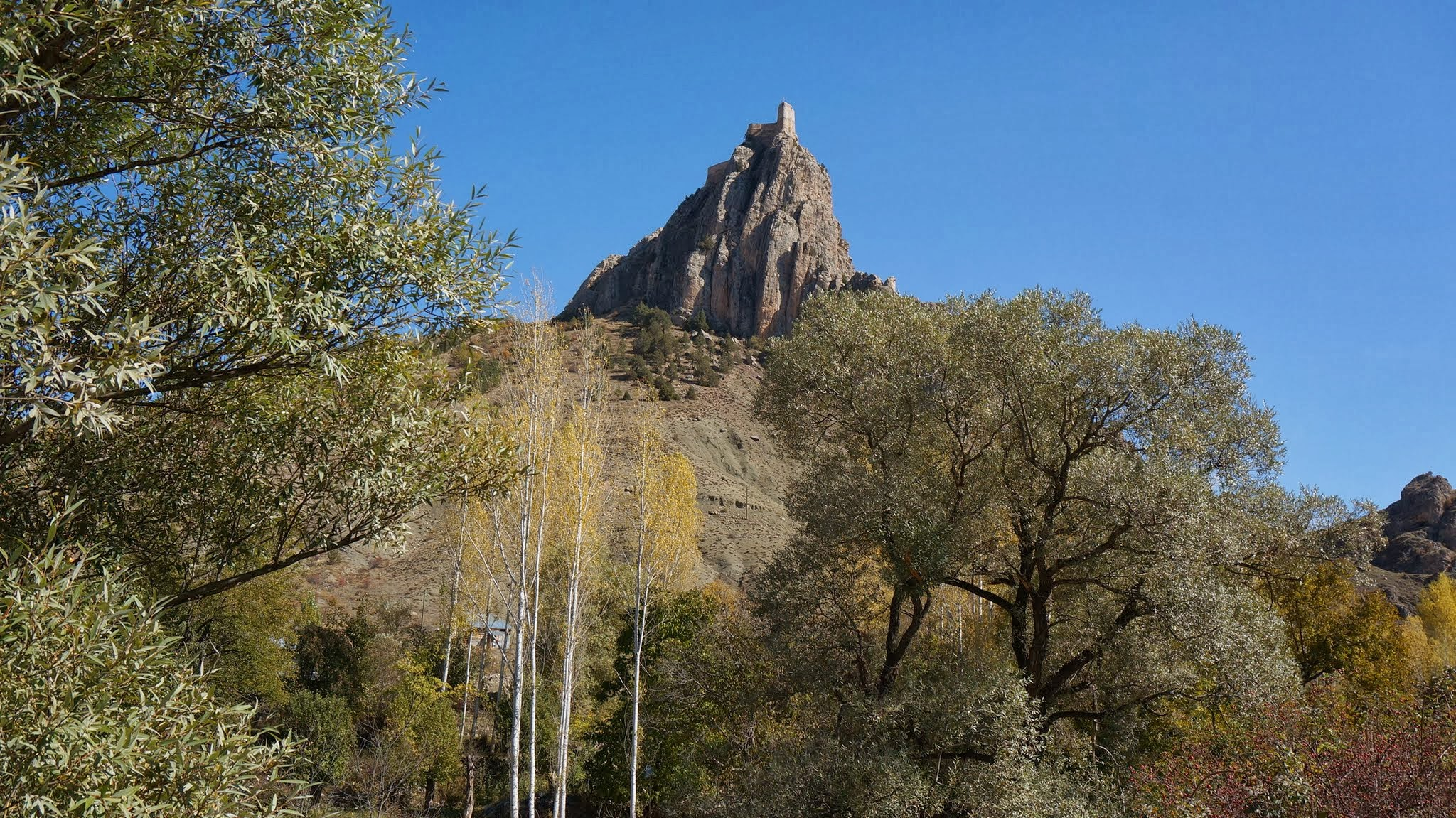
Rock outcrops near ruins of Bucaği fort, Gümüşhane, northeastern Turkey (re. P. orientalis)

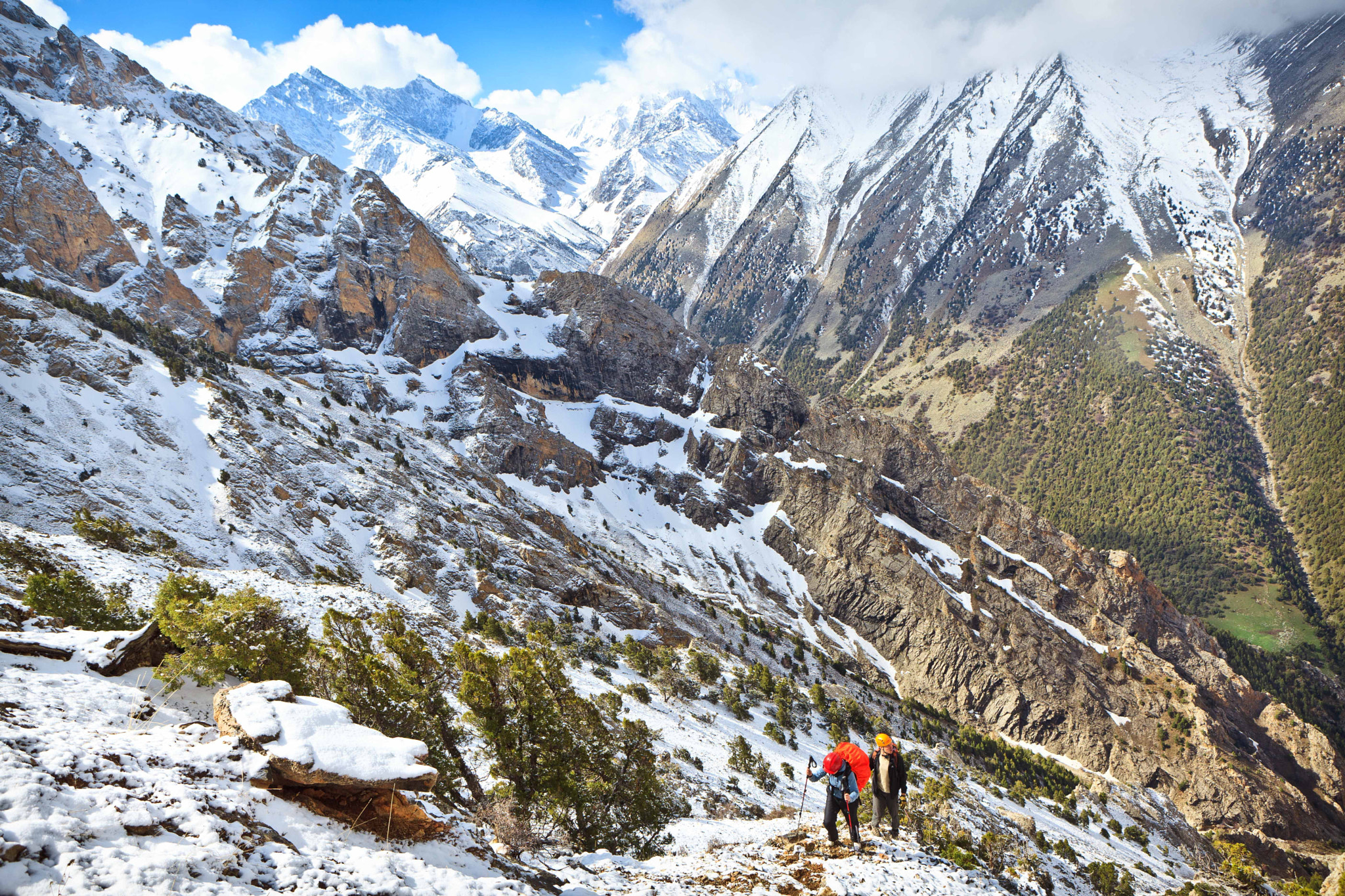
Pamir-Alay range, Kyrgyzstan re. P. alaica (the only Physochlaina species to be named after the region in which it grows)

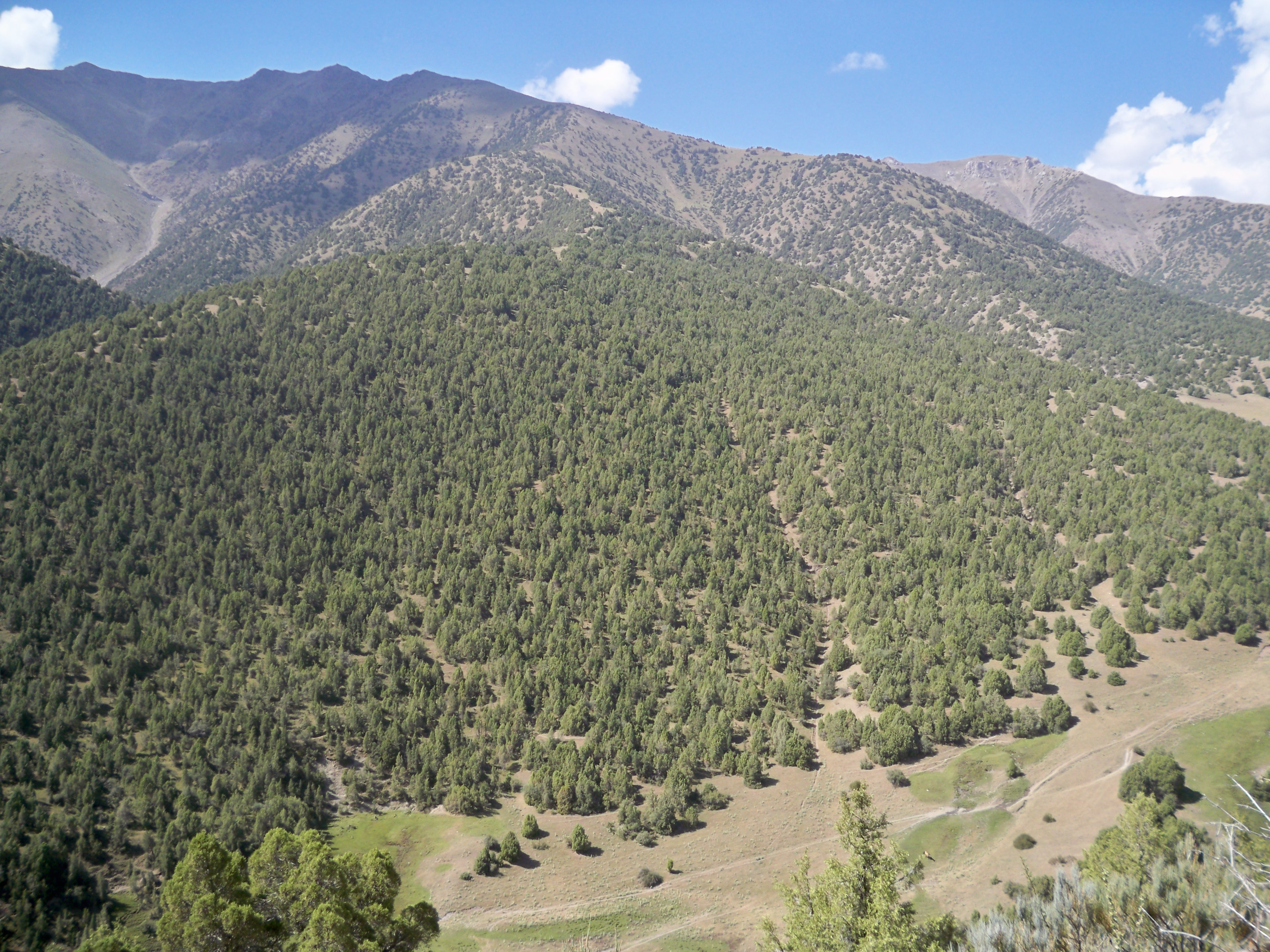
Wooded slopes, Turkestan Range, Kyrgyzstan re. P. alaica

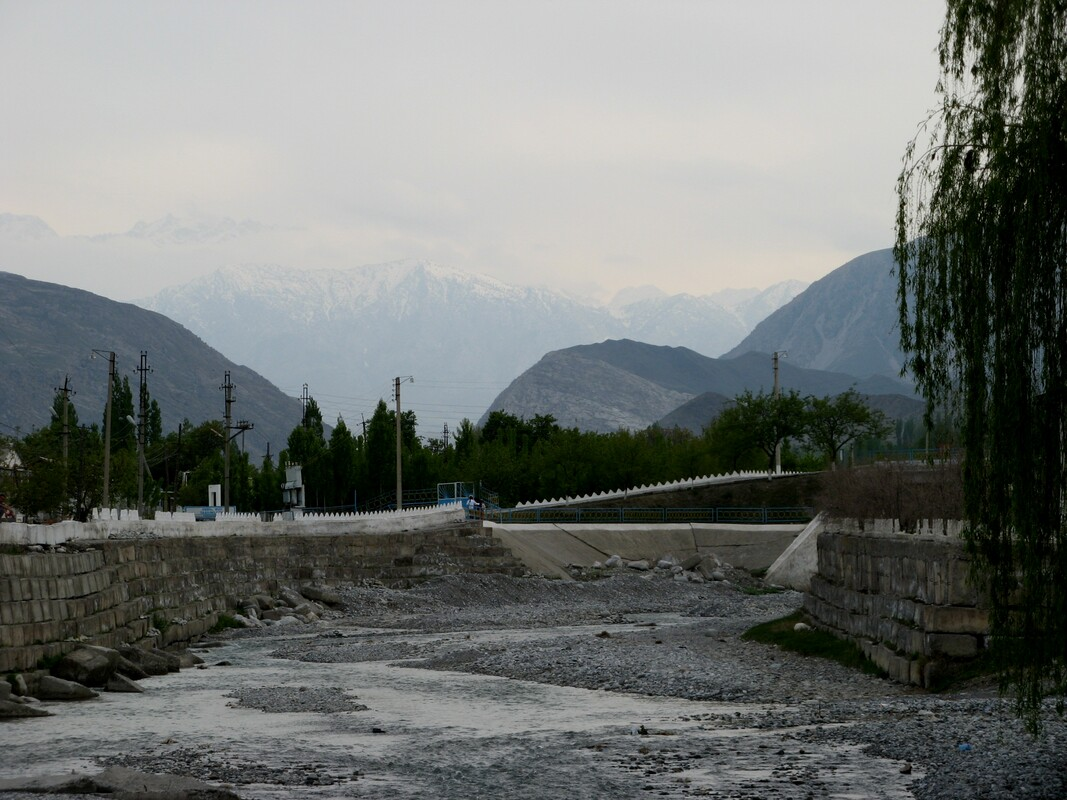
Shohimardon District, Fergana exclave, Uzbekistan, re. P. alaica

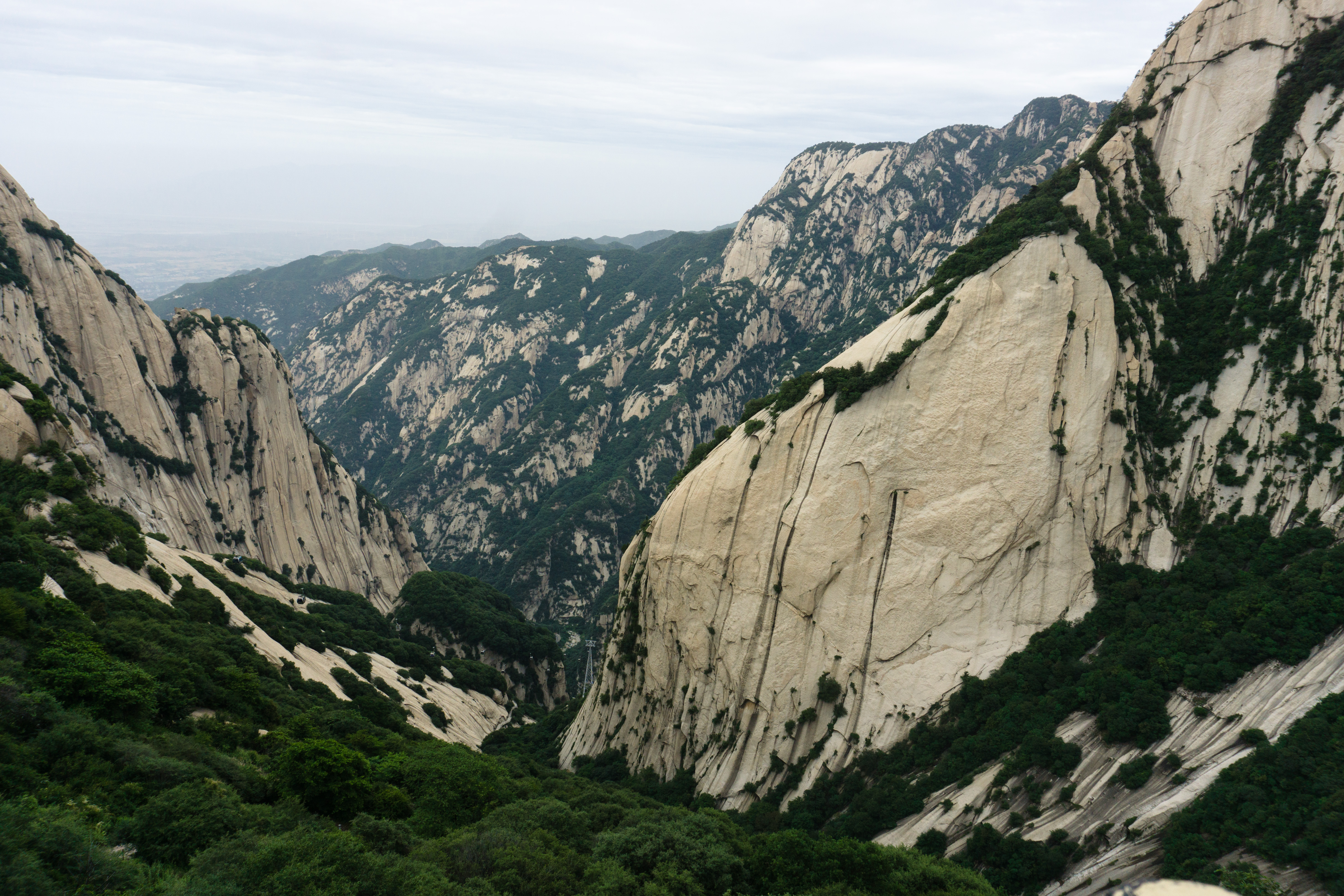
Mount Hua, Shaanxi province, China (re. P. infundibularis)

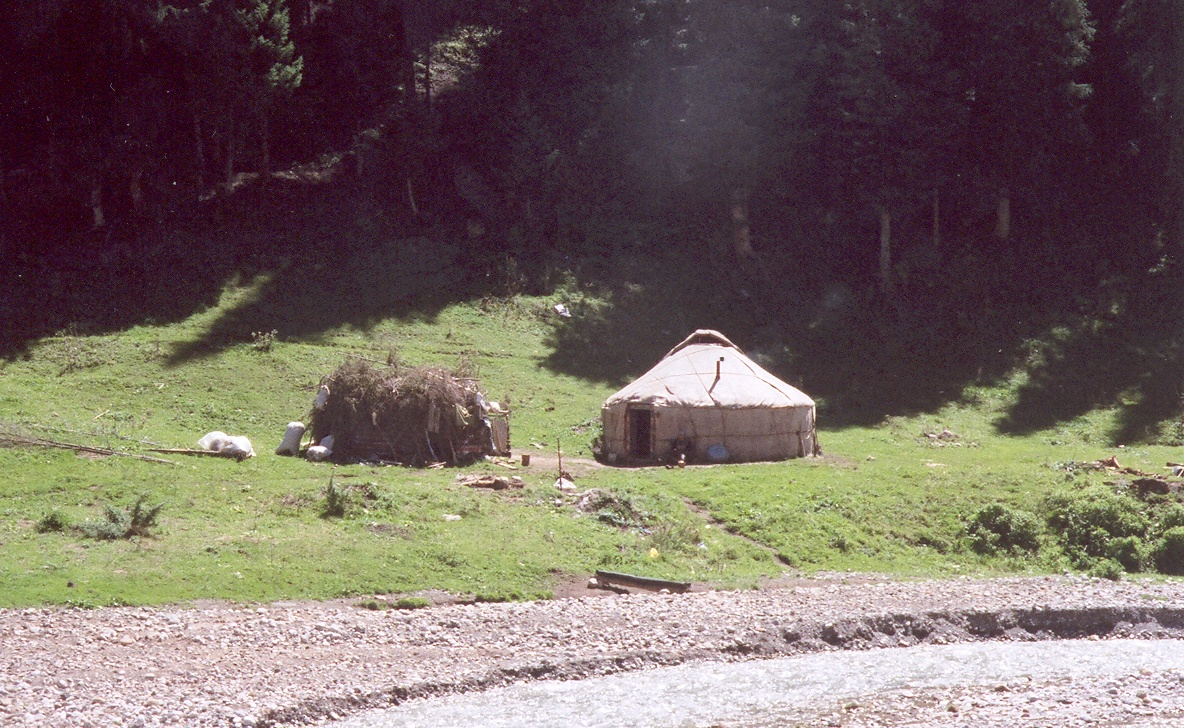
Banks of the Ili River, Ili Kazakh Autonomous Region, Xinjiang (re. P. capitata)

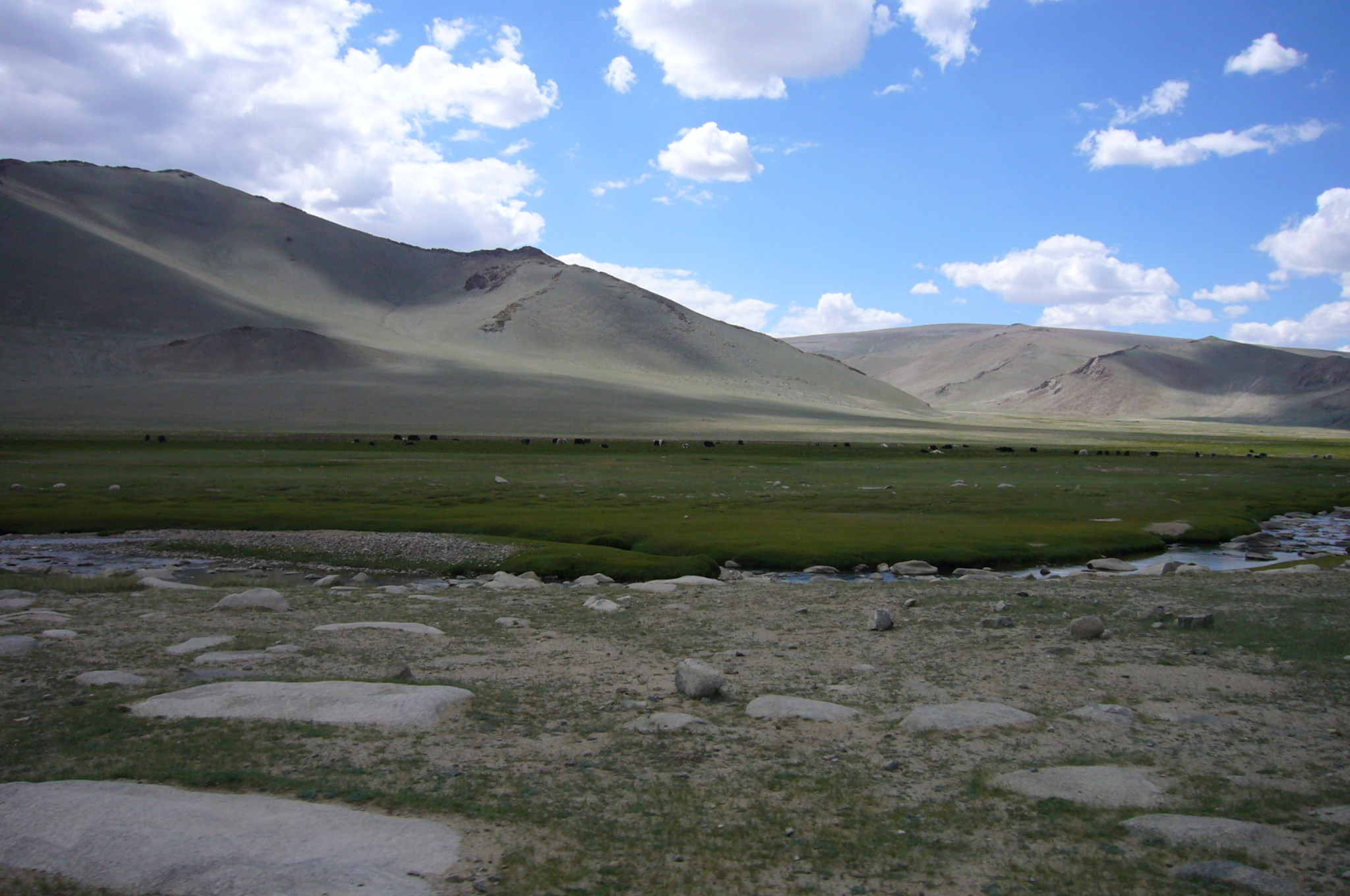
Altai Mountains, Mongolia (re. P. physaloides and P. albiflora)

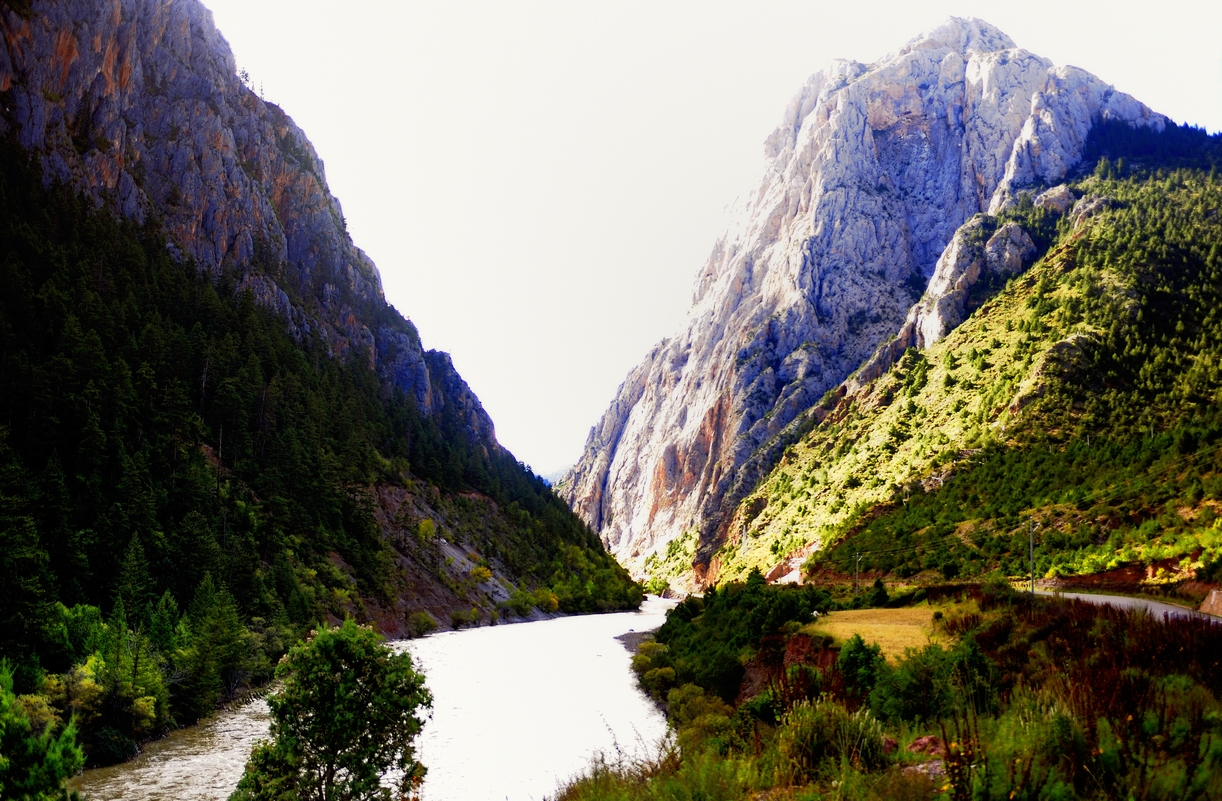
Yu Chu River, Héngduàn Shānmài 橫斷山脈. The Hengduan Mountains of southwest China are home to several Physochlaina spp.
