= Chinese folk religion =

Chinese folk religion or Shendao comprises a range of traditional religious practices of Han Chinese, including the Chinese diaspora. This includes the veneration of shen ('spirits') and ancestors, and worship devoted to deities and immortals, who can be deities of places or natural phenomena, of human behaviour, or progenitors of family lineages. Stories surrounding these gods form a loose canon of Chinese mythology. By the Song dynasty (960–1279), these practices had been blended with Buddhist, Confucian, and Taoist teachings to form the popular religious system which has lasted in many ways into the present day. The government of modern China generally tolerates popular religious movements, but has suppressed or persecuted large organizations that they fear would undermine social stability.

The Chinese government formally recognizes five religions: Buddhism, Taoism, Catholic Christianity, Protestant Christianity, and Islam. Chinese folk religion, being a syncretism, is not considered by the government to be a religion because it has ambiguous boundaries and a poorly defined structure, which is why Taoism and Buddhism are recognized as the country's historical religions, but folk religion is considered part of China's cultural heritage.

After the fall of the Qing dynasty in 1911, governments and modernizing elites condemned "feudal superstition" (封建迷信; fèngjiàn míxìn) and opposed traditional religious practices which they believed conflicted with modern values. By the late 20th century, these attitudes began to change in both mainland China and Taiwan, and many scholars now view folk religion in a positive light. In China, the revival of traditional religion has benefited from official interest in preserving traditional culture, such as Mazuism and the Sanyi teaching in Fujian, Yellow Emperor worship, and other forms of local worship, such as that of the Dragon King, Pangu or Caishen.

Feng shui, acupuncture, and traditional Chinese medicine reflect this world view, since features of the landscape as well as organs of the body are in correlation with the five powers and yin and yang.

== Diversity ==
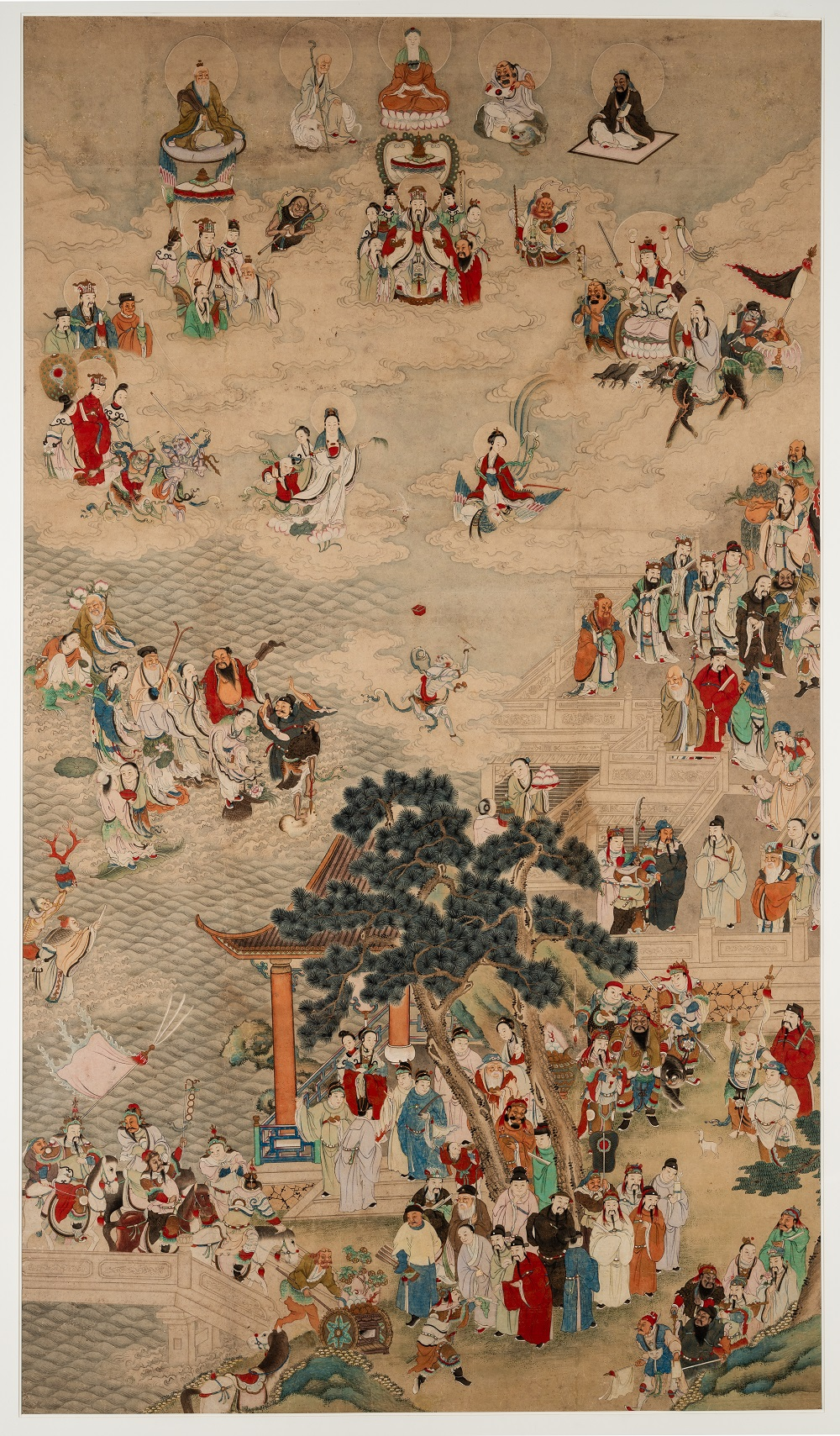
Qing dynasty painting of the Chinese pantheon

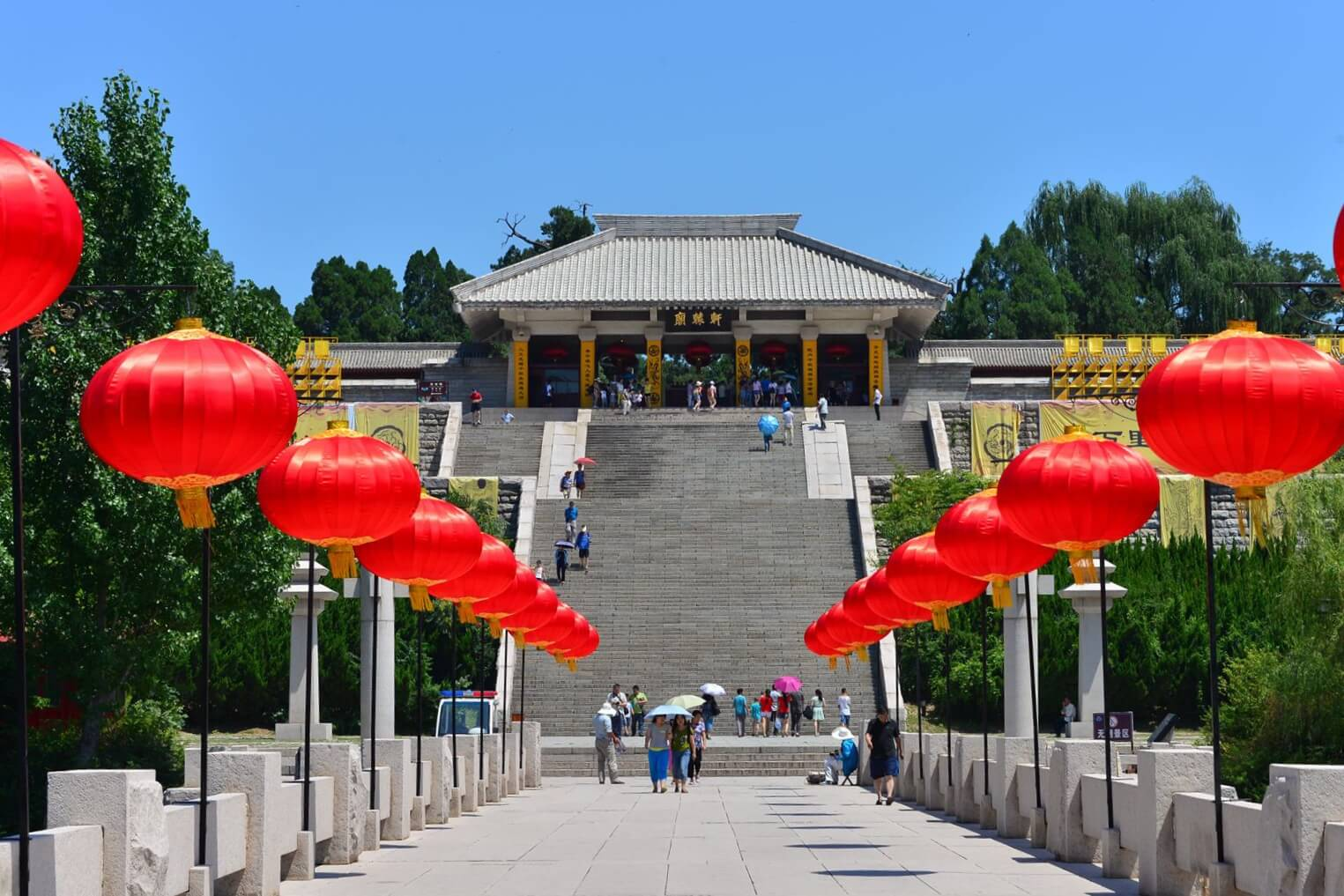
Xuanyuan Temple, dedicated to the worship of the Yellow Emperor, located in Huangling County, Shaanxi

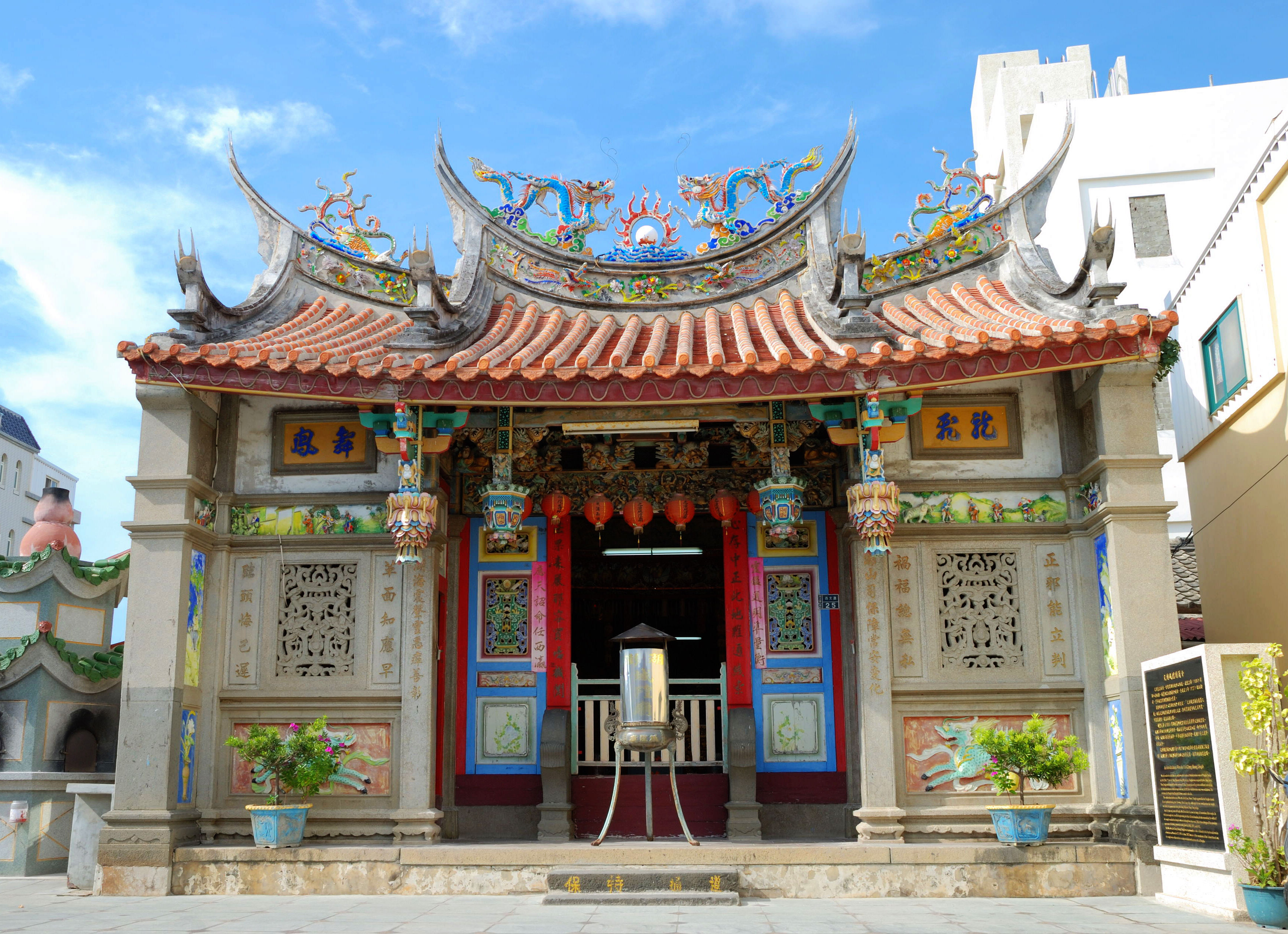
The Temple of the City God in Wen'ao, Magong, Taiwan

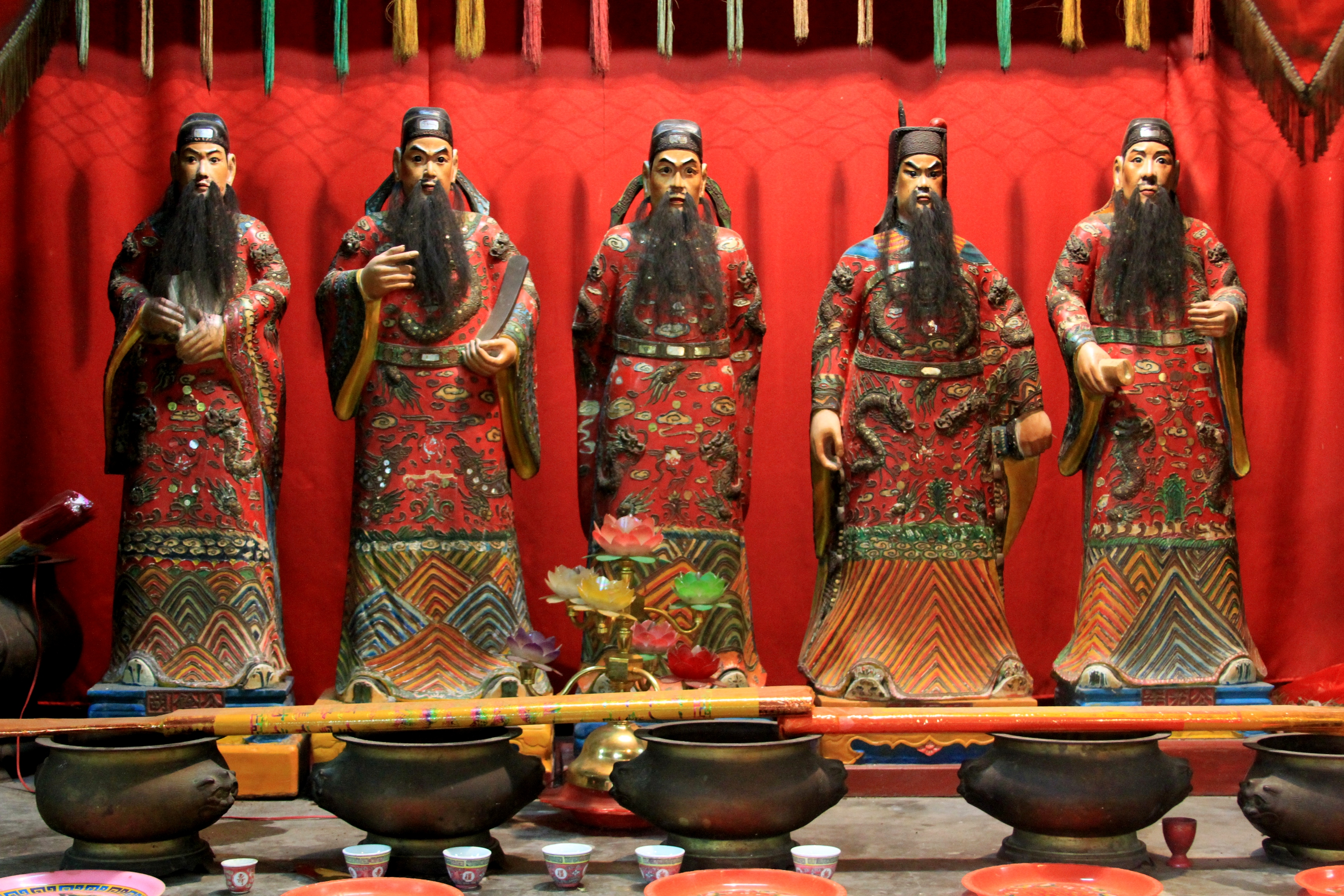
Altar inside the Temple of the Five Lords in Haikou, Hainan

Chinese religions have a variety of sources, local forms, founder backgrounds, and ritual and philosophical traditions. Despite this diversity, there is a common core that can be summarised as four theological, cosmological, and moral concepts: Tian, the transcendent source of moral meaning; qi, the breath or energy that animates the universe; ancestor veneration; and bao ying 'moral reciprocity'. With these, there are two traditional concepts of fate and meaning: ming yun, the personal destiny or burgeoning; and yuanfen 'fateful coincidence', good and bad chances and potential relationships.

Yin and yang is the polarity that describes the order of the universe, held in balance by the interaction of principles of extension (神; shén; 'spirit') and returning (鬼; guǐ; 'ghost'), with yang ('act') usually preferred over yin ('receptiveness') in common religion. The taijitu and bagua are common diagrams representing the forces of nature, and the power that deities like Zhong Kui wield. Ling is the medium of the two states and the inchoate order of creation.

== Terminology ==
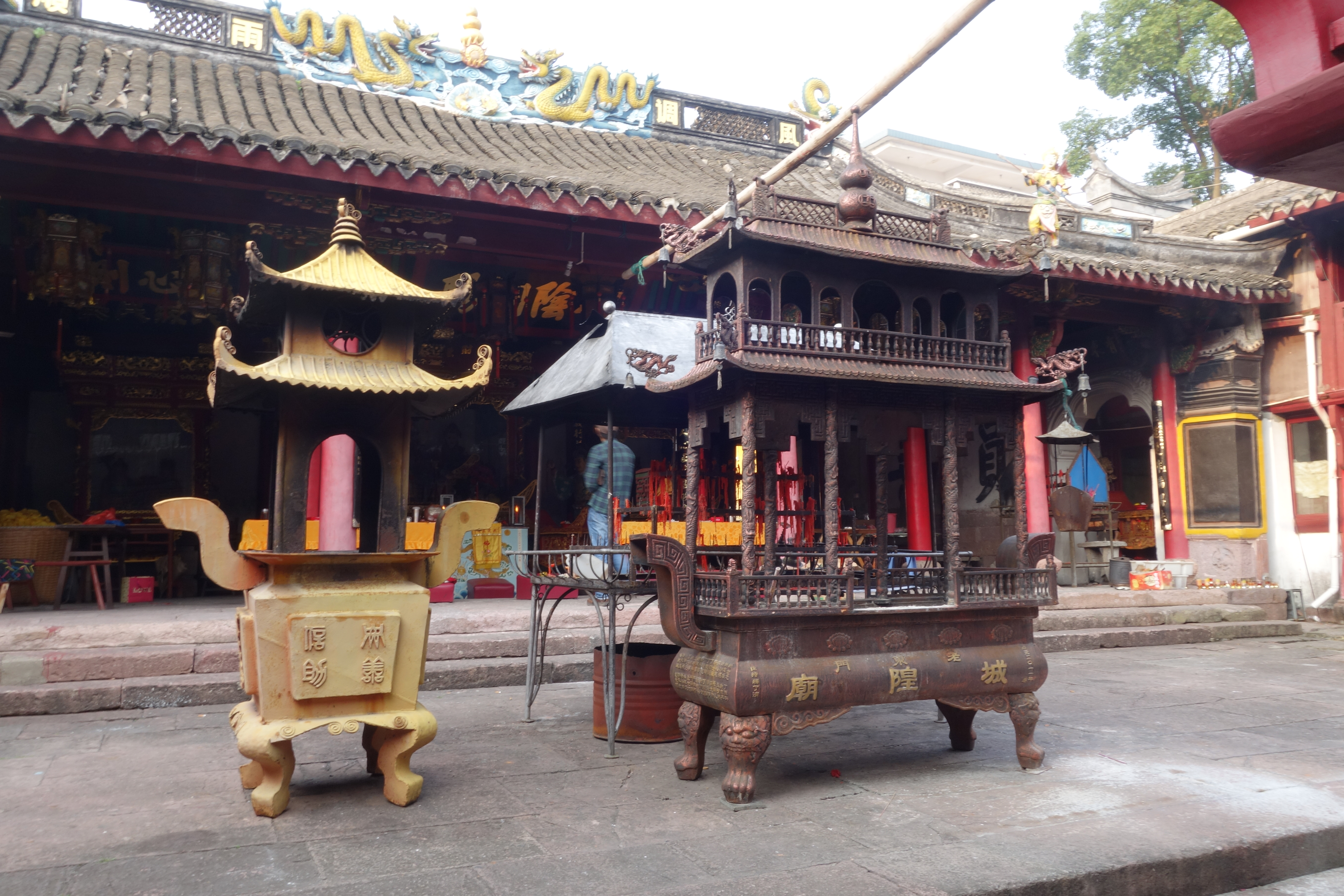
Temple of the City God of Dongmen, in Xiangshan County, Zhejiang

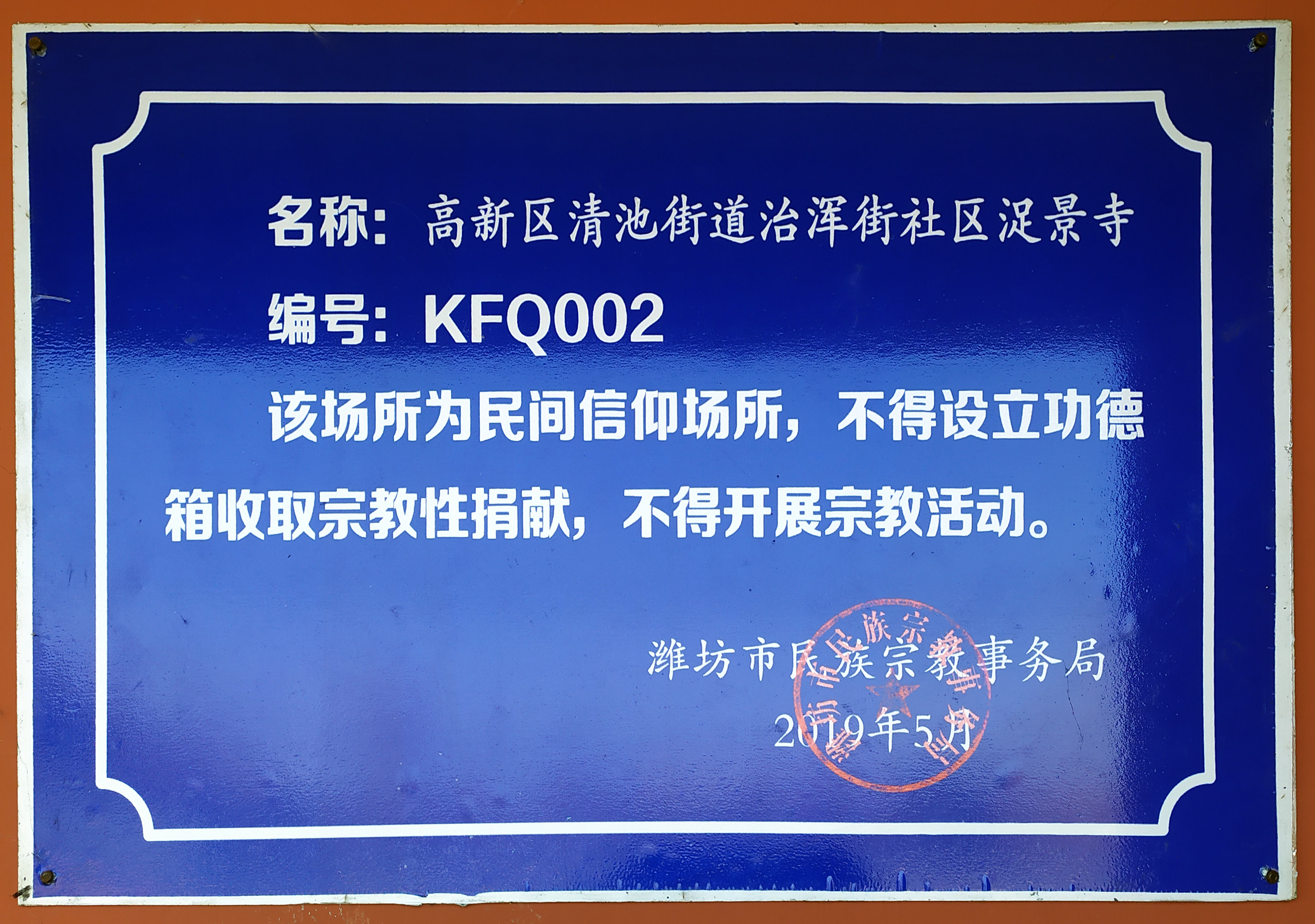
A sign in a temple in Weifang, Shandong, that reads "This is a place of folk belief. No religious donation or religious activities are allowed."

The Chinese language historically has not had a concept or overarching term for "religion". In English, the terms 'popular religion' or 'folk religion' have long been used to mean local religious life. In Chinese academic literature and common usage 'folk religion' (民間宗教; mínjiān zōngjiào) refers to specific organised folk religious sects. The current meaning of "religion" (zongjiao 宗教) developed in Chinese discourses around 1900. In its earliest uses, it referred specifically to Christianity. It became more broadly used by intellectuals in China to describe exclusive systems of thought and practice with a congregational organization distinct from society as a whole, a viewpoint consistent with the Western post-Enlightenment view of religion.

Contemporary academic study of traditional cults and the creation of a government agency that gave legal status to this religion have created proposals to formalise names and deal more clearly with folk religious sects and help conceptualise research and administration. Terms that have been proposed include 'Chinese native religion' (民俗宗教; mínsú zōngjiào), 'Chinese ethnic religion' (民族宗教; mínzú zōngjiào), or 'Chinese religion' (中華教; zhōnghuájiào) viewed as comparable to the usage of the term "Hinduism" for Indian religion. Academics in the People's Republic of China generally use the term "popular belief" (民間信仰; minjian xinyang) to encompass both folk religion and broader folk practices.

In Malaysia, reports the scholar Tan Chee-Beng, Chinese do not have a definite term for their traditional religion, which is not surprising because "the religion is diffused into various aspects of Chinese culture". They refer to their religion as 'Buddha worship' (拜佛; bàifó) or 'spirit worship' (拜神; bàishén), which prompted Alan J. A. Elliott to suggest the term 神教 (shénjiào; 'shenism') for the practice in Malaysia. Tan, however, comments that is not the way the Chinese refer to their religion and suggests it is logical to use "Chinese Religion". Shenxianism 神仙教 (shénxiān jiào), literally 'religion of deities and immortals', is a term partly inspired by Elliott's "shenism" neologism.

During the late Qing dynasty, scholars Yao Wendong and Chen Jialin used the term shenjiao not referring to Shinto as a definite religious system, but to local shin beliefs in Japan. Other terms are 'folk cults' (民間崇拜; mínjiān chóngbài), 'spontaneous religion' (自發宗教; zìfā zōngjiào), 'lived religion' (生活宗教; shēnghuó zōngjiào), 'local religion' (地方宗教; dìfāng zōngjiào), and 'diffused religion' (分散性宗教; fēnsàn xìng zōngjiào). 'Folk beliefs' (民間信仰; mínjiān xìnyǎng), is a seldom used term taken by scholars in colonial Taiwan from Japanese during Japan's occupation (1895–1945). It was used between the 1990s and the early 21st century among mainland Chinese scholars.

Shendao (神道; shéndào; 'the Way of the Gods') is a term already used in the I Ching referring to the divine order of nature. Around the time of the spread of Buddhism during the Han dynasty (202 BCE – 220 CE), it was used to distinguish the indigenous ancient religion from the imported religion. Ge Hong used it in his Baopuzi as a synonym for Taoism. The term was subsequently adopted in Japan in the 6th century as Shindo, later Shinto, with the same purpose of identification of the Japanese indigenous religion. In the 14th century, the Hongwu Emperor (Taizu of the Ming dynasty, 1328–1398) used the term "Shendao" clearly identifying the indigenous cults, which he strengthened and systematised.

"Chinese Universism"—not in the sense of "universalism" as in "a system of universal application", as that is Tian in Chinese thought—is a coinage of Jan Jakob Maria de Groot that refers to the metaphysical perspective that lies behind the Chinese religious tradition. De Groot calls Chinese Universism "the ancient metaphysical view that serves as the basis of all classical Chinese thought. ... In Universism, the three components of integrated universe—understood epistemologically, 'heaven, earth and man', and understood ontologically, 'Taiji (the great beginning, the highest ultimate), yin and yang'—are formed".

In 1931, Hu Shih argued that: "Two great religions have played tremendously important roles throughout Chinese history. One is Buddhism which came to China probably before the Christian era but which began to exert nation-wide influence only after the third century A.D. The other great religion has had no generic name, but I propose to call it Siniticism. It is the native ancient religion of the Han Chinese people: it dates back to time immemorial, over 10,000 years old, and includes all such later phases of its development as Moism, Confucianism (as a state religion), and all the various stages of the Taoist religion."

=== Attributes ===
Contemporary Chinese scholars have identified what they consider the essential features of the Chinese indigenous religion: according to Chen Xiaoyi (陳曉毅) local indigenous religion is the crucial factor for a harmonious 'religious ecology' (宗教生態), that is the balance of forces in a given community. Christian missionaries used the label 'feudal superstition' as propaganda to undermine what they saw as religious competition. Han calls for the acknowledgment of the ancient Chinese religion for what it really is, the 'core and soul of popular culture' (俗文化的核心與靈魂).

According to Chen Jinguo (陳進國), the ancient Chinese religion is a core element of Chinese 'cultural and religious self-awareness' (文化自覺，信仰自覺). He has proposed a theoretical definition of Chinese indigenous religion in a 'trinity' (三位一體), apparently inspired to Tang Chun-i's thought:

- Substance (體; tǐ): religiousness (宗教性; zōngjiào xìng);
- Function (用; yòng): folkloricity (民俗性; mínsú xìng);
- Quality (相; xiàng): Chineseness (中華性; zhōnghuá xìng).

== Characteristics ==
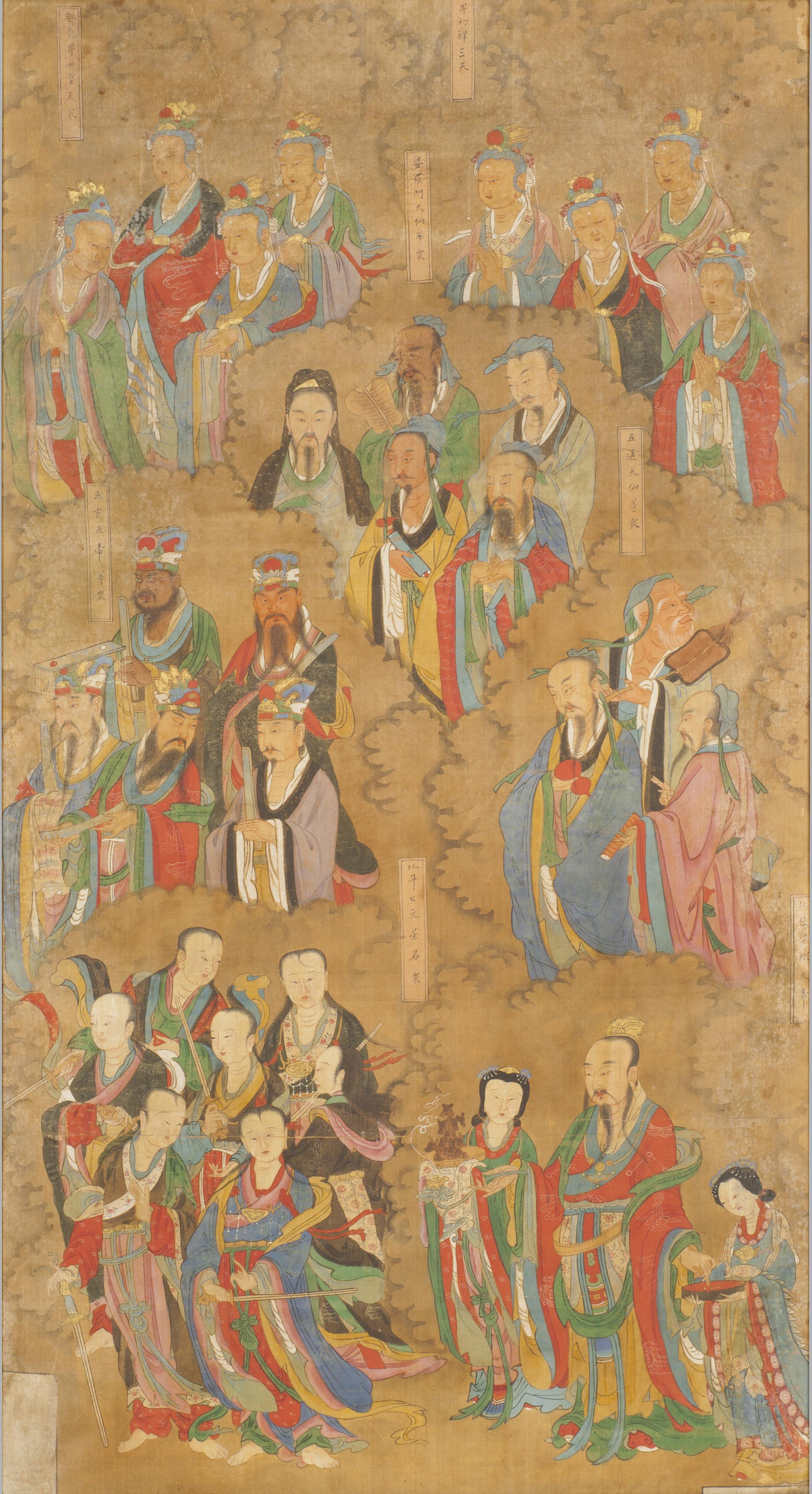
Qing-era Shuilu ritual painting depicting Buddhist, Daoist, and folk deities

=== Diversity and unity ===
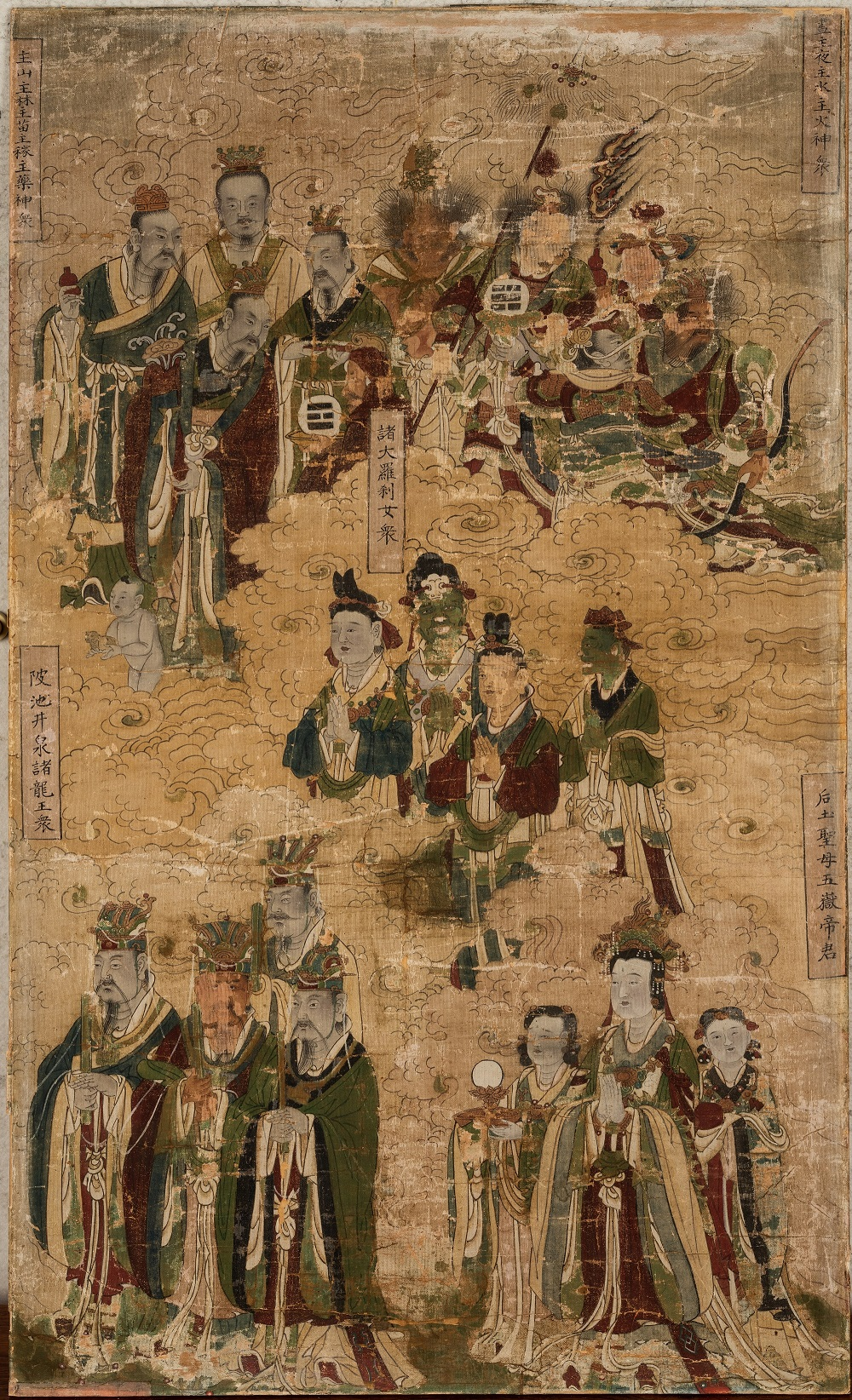
Ming-era painting of deities, housed in Hunan Museum

Ancient Chinese religious practices are diverse, varying from province to province and even from one village to another, for religious behaviour is bound to local communities, kinship, and environments. In each setting, institution and ritual behaviour assumes highly organised forms. Temples and the gods in them acquire symbolic character and perform specific functions involved in the everyday life of the local community. Local religion preserves aspects of naturalistic beliefs such as totemism, animism, and shamanism.

Ancient Chinese religion pervades all aspects of social life. Many scholars, following the lead of sociologist C. K. Yang, see the ancient Chinese religion deeply embedded in family and civic life, rather than expressed in a separate organizational structure like a "church", as in the West.

Deity or temple associations and lineage associations, pilgrimage associations and formalized prayers, rituals and expressions of virtues, are the common forms of organization of Chinese religion on the local level. Neither initiation rituals nor official membership into a church organization separate from one person's native identity are mandatory in order to be involved in religious activities. Contrary to institutional religions, Chinese religion does not require "conversion" for participation.

The prime criterion for participation in the ancient Chinese religion is not "to believe" in an official doctrine or dogma, but "to belong" to the local unit of an ancient Chinese religion, that is the "association", the "village" or the "kinship", with their gods and rituals. Sociologist Richard Madsen describes the ancient Chinese religion, adopting the definition of Tu Weiming, as characterized by "immanent transcendence" grounded in a devotion to "concrete humanity", focused on building moral community within concrete humanity.

Inextricably linked to the aforementioned question to find an appropriate "name" for the ancient Chinese religion, is the difficulty to define it or clearly outline its boundaries. Old sinology, especially Western, tried to distinguish "popular" and "élite" traditions (the latter being Confucianism and Taoism conceived as independent systems). Chinese sinology later adopted another dichotomy which continues in contemporary studies, distinguishing "folk beliefs" (minjian xinyang) and "folk religion" (minjian zongjiao), the latter referring to the doctrinal sects.

Many studies have pointed out that it is impossible to draw clear distinctions, and, since the 1970s, sinologists like Kristofer Schipper, swung to the idea of a unified "ancient Chinese religion" that would define the Chinese national identity, similarly to Hindu Dharma for India and Shinto for Japan. Other sinologists who have not espoused the idea of a unified "national religion" have studied Chinese religion as a system of meaning, or have brought further development in C. K. Yang's distinction between "institutional religion" and "diffused religion", the former functioning as a separate body from other social institutions, and the latter intimately part of secular social institutions.

== History ==
=== Prehistory ===
In the beginning of Chinese civilization, "[t]he most honored members of the family were...the ancestors", who lived in a spiritual world between heaven and earth and beseeched the gods of heaven and earth to influence the world to benefit their family.

=== Imperial China ===
Divination, a major component of folk religion, developed in China by 1250-1150 BCE. The Yijing and the Eight Trigrams were well-established by 1000 BCE.

The concepts of yin and yang and the five phases/agents developed by the third century BCE.

By the Han dynasty, the ancient Chinese religion mostly consisted of people organising into shè (社; "group, body, local community altars") who worshipped their godly principle. In many cases the "lord of the she" was the god of the earth, and in others a deified virtuous person (仙; xiān; "immortal"). Some cults such as that of Liu Zhang, a king in what is today Shandong, date back to this period.

From the 3rd century on by the Northern Wei, accompanying the spread of Buddhism in China, strong influences from the Indian subcontinent penetrated the ancient Chinese indigenous religion. A cult of Ganesha (象頭神; Xiàngtóushén; "Elephant-Head God") is attested in the year 531. Pollination from Indian religions included processions of carts with images of gods or floats borne on shoulders, with musicians and chanting.

For much of China's imperial period, Chinese religion was generally the Three Teachings of Confucianism, Buddhism, and Taoism. Folk or popular religion as practices distinct from the Three Teachings began primarily from the Song dynasty.

Folk religion, particularly ancestor worship and territorial cults, had a central position in the religious environment during late imperial China. Territorial cults are based around communities worshipping deities that protect the community. Temples for territorial cults were administered by toushou, local notables who were typically men.

During this period, women were excluded from certain rituals.

=== 19th–20th century ===
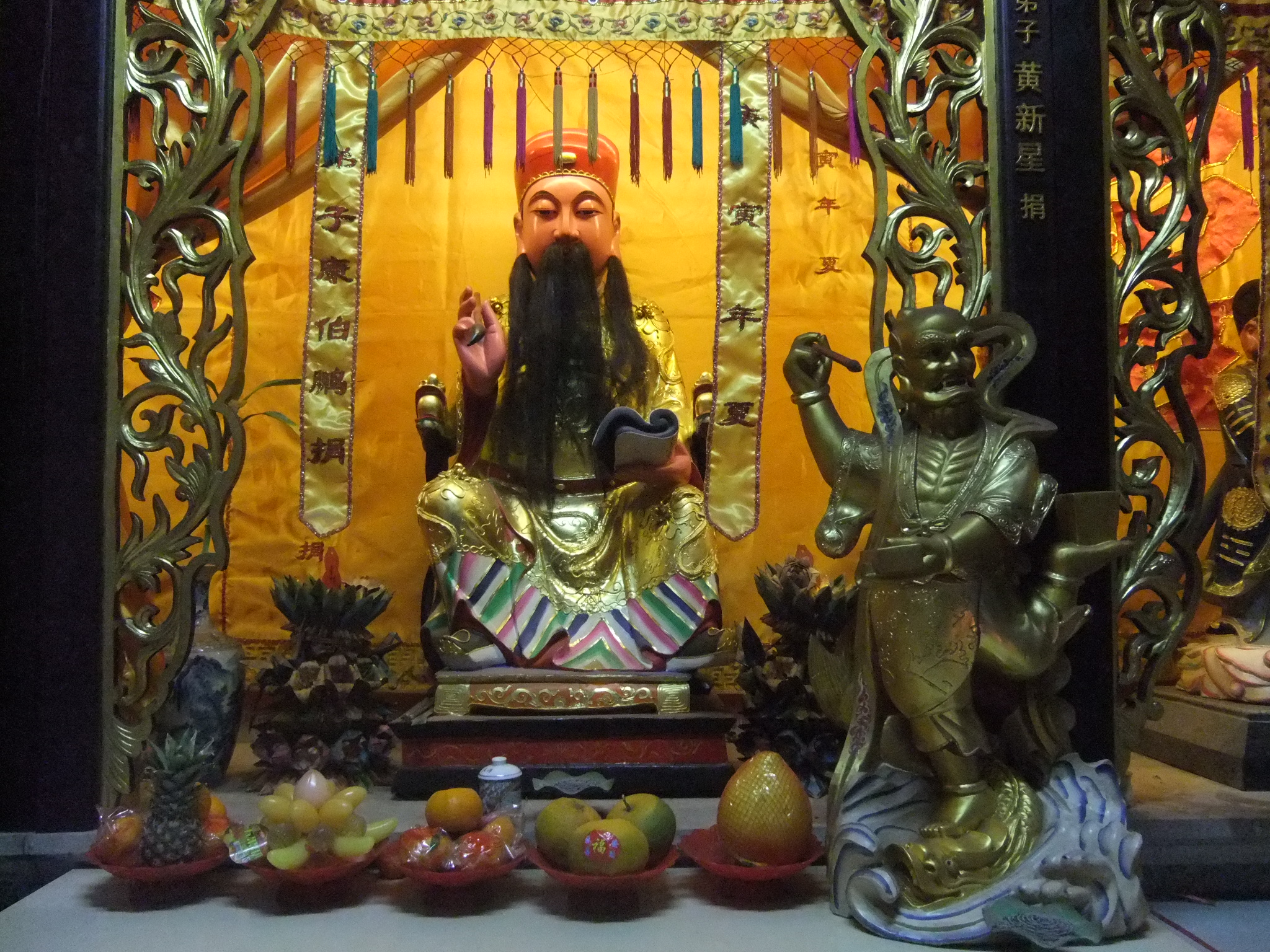
Zitong altar in a temple of Quanzhou, Fujian. To his left there is a statue of Kuixing.

The ancient Chinese religion was subject to persecution in the 19th and 20th centuries. In 1898, Kang Youwei persuaded the Emperor to issue an edict confiscating temples which were not performing state sacrifices and turn them into schools. The temple confiscations were shortly reversed. Many ancient temples were destroyed during the Taiping Rebellion and the Boxer Rebellion in the late 1800s. After the Xinhai Revolution of 1911 "most temples were turned to other uses or were destroyed, with a few changed into schools". During the Japanese invasion of China between 1937 and 1945 many temples were used as barracks by soldiers and destroyed in warfare.

In the past, popular cults were regulated by imperial government policies, promoting certain deities while suppressing others. In the 20th century, with the decline of the Qing dynasty, increasing urbanisation and Western influence, the issue for the new intellectuals who looked to the West was no longer controlling unauthorised worship of unregistered gods but the ancient Chinese religion itself, which they perceived as an issue halting modernisation. In 1898, Kang Youwei persuaded the Emperor to issue an edict confiscating folk religion temples which were not performing state sacrifices and turn them into schools. The temple confiscations were shortly reversed.

By 1899, 400 syncretic temples that combined folk religion elements and gods with Buddhist, Taoist, and/or Confucianist gods existed on the American West Coast alone.

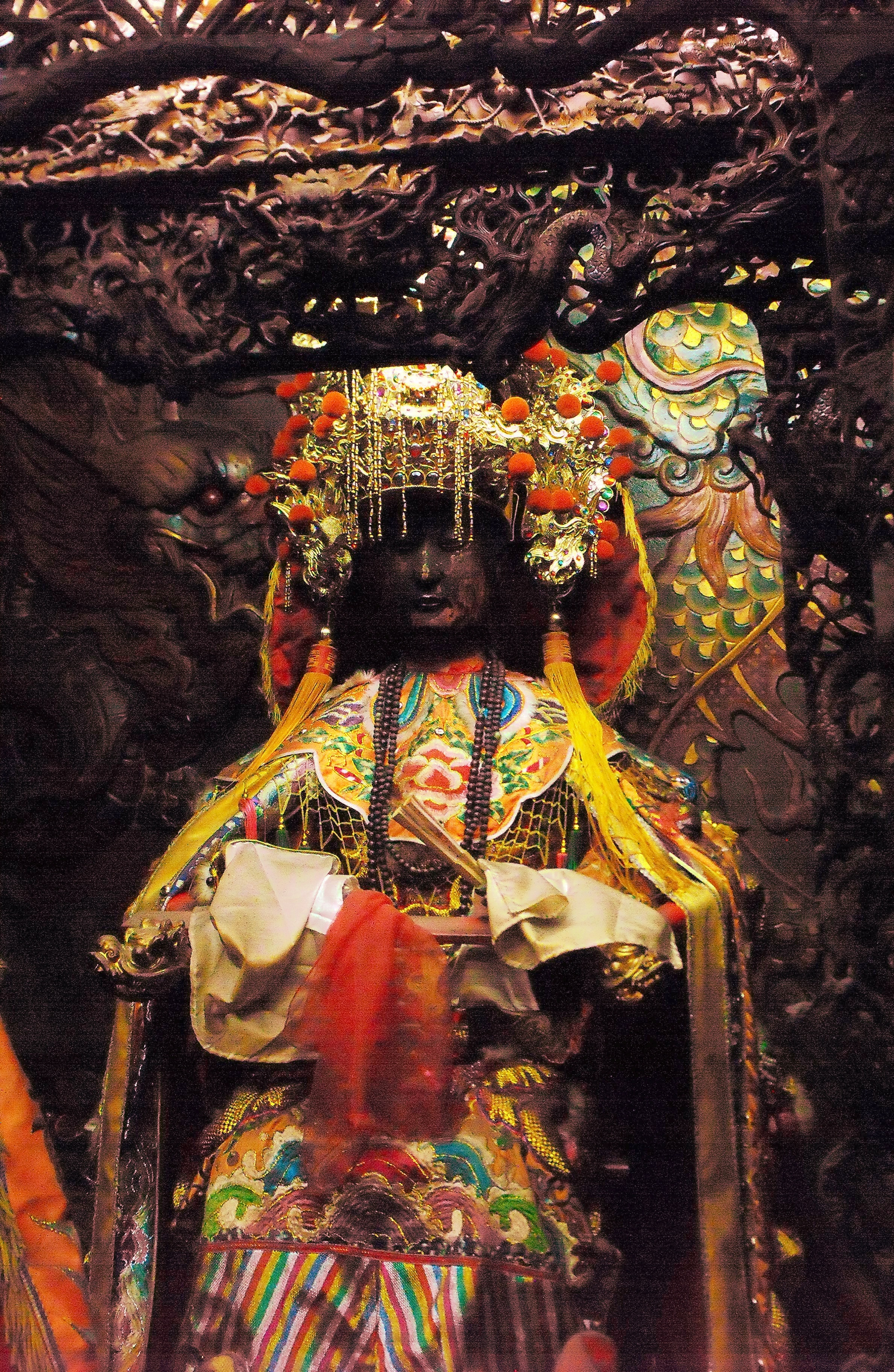
Statue of Mazu at a temple in Chiayi, Taiwan

In 1904, a reform policy of the late Qing dynasty provided that schools would be built through the confiscation of temple property. "Anti-superstition" campaigns followed.

After the founding of the Republic of China, intellectuals and politicians increasingly viewed folk religion as superstitious and believed that it demonstrated the backwardness and political weakness of the Chinese people. The ROC continued the Qing-era drive to convert temples into other institutions. The Nationalist government intensified the suppression of the ancient Chinese religion with the 1928 "Standards for retaining or abolishing gods and shrines"; the policy attempted to abolish the cults of all gods with the exception of ancient great human heroes and sages such as the Yellow Emperor, Yu the Great, Guan Yu, Sun Tzu, Nuwa, Mazu, Guanyin, Xuanzang, Kūkai, Buddha, Budai, Bodhidharma, Laozi, and Confucius. After 1928, the ROC campaign to against folk religion temples became more intense in the name of opposing feudal superstition, particularly in north China, and increasingly emphasized the physical destruction of temples. The ROC temple conversion campaign lasted until the start of the Second Sino-Japanese War.

ROC policies were the background for those implemented by Chinese Communist Party (CCP) after winning the Chinese Civil War and taking power in 1949. Temples were destroyed during anti-superstition campaigns in the 1950s, and during the Land Reform Movement temple land was seized and redistributed to the poor. Land reform, as well as collectivization and the development of the commune system, weakened the sociological structures that had underlay folk religious practice in the countryside.

After the Socialist Education Movement began, the CCP contended that folk religion was being used by class enemies to impede the development of socialism.

The Cultural Revolution, between 1966 and 1976 of the Chairman Mao period in the PRC, was the most serious and last systematic effort to destroy the ancient Chinese religion, while in Taiwan the ancient Chinese religion was very well-preserved but controlled by Republic of China (Taiwan) president Chiang Kai-shek during his Chinese Cultural Renaissance to counter the Cultural Revolution.

Chinese government holds ceremony in honor of the Yellow Emperor on the 2021 Qingming Festival, reported by CNS.

After the adoption of the 1978 constitution, ancient Chinese religion started to rapidly revive in China, with millions of temples being rebuilt or built from scratch. Like ancestor veneration, territorial cults re-emerged, often having acquired more features of Buddhist practice.

Since the 1980s the central government moved to a policy of benign neglect or wu wei (無為) in regard to rural community life, and the local government's new regulatory relationship with local society is characterised by practical mutual dependence; these factors have given much space for popular religion to develop. Resurgence of folk religion has varied by region. Central Zhejiang is among the areas with substantial increase in folk religious practices following the Mao era.

Worship of the Yellow Emperor increased substantially in the 1980s, especially with the financial support of overseas Chinese.

The reconstruction of temples reached a high point of activity from the 1990s to the early 2000s. Women frequently took a lead role in the efforts to fundraise for and organize temple re-building. Estimates hold that between the end of the Mao era and 2016, from one to million temples had been rebuilt or restored.

=== 21st century ===
Instead of signaling the demise of traditional ancient religion, China and Taiwan's economic and technological industrialization and development has brought a spiritual renewal.

In recent years, in some cases, local governments have taken positive and supportive attitudes towards indigenous religion in the name of promoting cultural heritage.

Through the religious policy of Xi Jinping's administration, the state has taken a more favorable view towards folk religion, encouraging the registration of temples and emphasizing their value as part of traditional Chinese culture. Previously, few temples were able to obtain registered legal status, often by registering as Buddhist or Daoist sites. Following policy changes in the Xi administration, folk religion temples can register as folk belief activities sites (minjian xinyang huodong changsuo).

== Texts ==
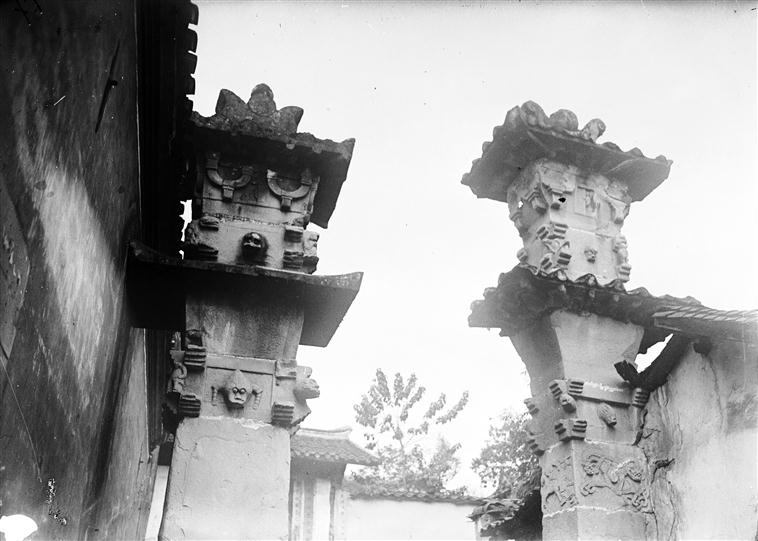
Eastern Han (25–220 AD) Chinese stone-carved que pillar gates of Dingfang, Zhong County, Chongqing that once belonged to a temple dedicated to the Warring States era general Ba Manzi

Ancient Chinese religion draws from a vast heritage of sacred books, which according to the general worldview treat cosmology, history and mythology, mysticism and philosophy, as aspects of the same thing. Historically, the revolutionary shift toward a preference for textual transmission and text-based knowledge over long-standing oral traditions first becomes detectable in the 1st century CE. The spoken word, however, never lost its power. Rather than writing replacing the power of the spoken word, both existed side by side. Scriptures had to be recited and heard in order to be efficacious, and the limitations of written texts were acknowledged particularly in Taoism and folk religion.

There are the classic books (經; jīng; 'warp') such as the Confucian canon including the "Four Books and Five Classics" (四書五經; sìshū wǔjīng) and the "Classic of Filial Piety" (孝經; xiàojīng), then there are the Mozi (Mohism), the Huainanzi, the Shizi and the Xunzi. The "Interactions Between Heaven and Mankind" (天人感應; tiānrén gǎnyìng) is a set of Confucianised doctrines compiled in the Han dynasty by Dong Zhongshu, discussing politics in accordance with a personal Tian of whom mankind is viewed as the incarnation.

Taoism has a separate body of philosophical, theological and ritual literature, including the fundamental Daodejing (道德經; 'Book of the Way and its Virtue'), the Daozang (Taoist Canon), the Liezi and the Zhuangzi, and a great number of other texts either included or not within the Taoist Canon. Vernacular literature and the folk religious sects have produced a great body of popular mythological and theological literature, the baojuan (寶卷; 'precious scrolls').

Recent discovery of ancient books, such as the "Guodian texts" in the 1990s and the Huangdi sijing (黃帝四經; 'Four Books of the Yellow Emperor') in the 1970s, has given rise to new interpretations of the ancient Chinese religion and new directions in its post-Maoist renewal. Many of these books overcome the dichotomy between Confucian and Taoist traditions. The Guodian texts include, among others, the Taiyi Shengshui (太一生水; 'The Great One Gives Birth to Water'). Another book attributed to the Yellow Emperor is the Huangdi yinfujing (黃帝陰符經; 'Yellow Emperor's Book of the Hidden Symbol').

Classical books of mythology include the "Classic of Mountains and Seas" (山海經; shānhǎijīng), the "Record of Heretofore Lost Works" (拾遺記; shíyíjì), "The Peach Blossom Spring" (桃花源記; táohuāyuánjì), the "Investiture of the Gods" (封神演義; fēngshén yǎnyì), and the "Journey to the West" (西遊記; xīyóujì) among others.

== Core concepts of theology and cosmology ==
Fan and Chen summarise four spiritual, cosmological, and moral concepts: Tian (天), Heaven, the source of moral meaning; qi (氣), the breath or substance of which all things are made; the practice of jingzu (敬祖), the veneration of ancestors; bao ying (報應), moral reciprocity.

=== Tian, its li and qi ===
Tian or Di as the square of the north astral pole. "Tian is 顛; dian ('top'), the highest and unexceeded. It derives from the characters 一; yi, 'one', and 大; da, 'big'." (Note: The graphical etymology of 天; Tian as "Great One" (大一; Dà yī), and the phonetical etymology as 顛; diān, were first recorded by Xu Shen. John C. Didier in In and Outside the Square (2009) for the Sino-Platonic Papers discusses different etymologies which trace the character 天; Tian to the astral square or its ellipted forms, 口; dīng, representing the north celestial pole (pole star and Big Dipper revolving around it; historically a symbol of the absolute source of the universal reality in many cultures), which is the archaic (Shang) form of 丁; dīng ("square"). Gao Hongjin and other scholars trace the modern word Tian to the Shang pronunciation of 口; dīng (that is *teeŋ). This was also the origin of Shang's 帝; Dì ("Deity"), and later words meaning something "on high" or "top", including 頂; dǐng. The modern graph for 天; Tian would derive from a Zhou version of the Shang archaic form of 帝; Dì (from Shang oracle bone script →, which represents a fish entering the astral square); this Zhou version represents a being with a human-like body and a head-mind informed by the astral pole (→). Didier further links the Chinese astral square and Tian or Di characters to other well-known symbols of God or divinity as the northern pole in key ancient cultural centres: the Harappan and Vedic–Aryan spoked wheels, crosses and hooked crosses (卍/卐; wàn), and the Mesopotamian Dingir. Jixu Zhou (2005), also in the Sino-Platonic Papers, connects the etymology of 帝; Dì, Old Chinese *Tees, to the Indo-European Deus, God.)

Confucians, Taoists, and other schools of thought share basic concepts of Tian. Tian is both the physical heavens, the home of the sun, moon, and stars, and also the home of the gods and ancestors. Tian by extension is source of moral meaning, as seen in the political principle, the Mandate of Heaven, which holds that Tian, responding to human virtue, grants the imperial family the right to rule and withdraws it when the dynasty declines in virtue. This creativity or virtue (de) in humans is the potentiality to transcend the given conditions and act wisely and morally. Tian is therefore both transcendent and immanent.

Tian is defined in many ways, with many names, the most widely known being Tàidì (太帝; "the Great Deity") and Shàngdì (上帝; "the Primordial Deity"). (Note: Tian, besides Taidi ("Great Deity") and Shangdi ("Highest Deity"), Yudi ("Jade Deity"), Shen 神 ("God"), and Taiyi ("Great Oneness") as identified as the ladle of the 天門; Tiānmén ("Gate of Heaven", the Big Dipper), is defined by many other names attested in the Chinese literary, philosophical and religious tradition: Tiānshén (天神), the "God of Heaven", interpreted in the Shuowen jiezi (說文解字) as "the being that gives birth to all things"; Shénhuáng (神皇), "God the King", attested in Taihong ("The Origin of Vital Breath"); Tiāndì (天帝), the "Deity of Heaven" or "Emperor of Heaven".; A popular Chinese term is Lǎotiānyé (老天爺), "Old Heavenly Father".; Tiānzhǔ (天主)—the "Lord of Heaven": In "The Document of Offering Sacrifices to Heaven and Earth on the Mountain Tai" (Fengshan shu) of the Records of the Grand Historian it is used as the title of the first God from whom all the other gods derive.; Tiānhuáng (天皇)—the "August Personage of Heaven": In the "Poem of Fathoming Profundity" (Si'xuan fu), transcribed in "The History of the Later Han Dynasty" (Hou Han shu), Zhang Heng ornately writes: «I ask the superintendent of the Heavenly Gate to open the door and let me visit the King of Heaven at the Jade Palace»; Tiānwáng (天王)—the "King of Heaven" or "Monarch of Heaven".; Tiāngōng (天公)—the "Duke of Heaven" or "General of Heaven"; Tiānjūn (天君)—the "Prince of Heaven" or "Lord of Heaven"; Tiānzūn (天尊)—the "Heavenly Venerable", also a title for high gods in Taoist theologies; Tian is both transcendent and immanent, manifesting in the three forms of dominance, destiny and nature. In the Wujing yiyi (五經異義; "Different Meanings in the Five Classics"), Xu Shen explains that the designation of Heaven is quintuple: Huáng Tiān (皇天) —"Yellow Heaven" or "Shining Heaven", when it is venerated as the lord of creation; Hào Tiān (昊天)—"Vast Heaven", with regard to the vastness of its vital breath (qi); Mín Tiān (昊天)—"Compassionate Heaven" for it hears and corresponds with justice to the all-under-heaven; Shàng Tiān (上天)—"Highest Heaven" or "First Heaven", for it is the primordial being supervising all-under-heaven; Cāng Tiān (蒼天)—"Deep-Green Heaven", for it being unfathomably deep.) The concept of Shangdi is especially rooted in the tradition of the Shang dynasty, which gave prominence to the worship of ancestral gods and cultural heroes. The "Primordial Deity" or "Primordial Emperor" was considered to be embodied in the human realm as the lineage of imperial power. Di (帝) is a term meaning "deity" or "emperor" (Latin: imperator, verb im-perare; "making from within"), used either as a name of the primordial god or as a title of natural gods, describing a principle that exerts a fatherly dominance over what it produces. With the Zhou dynasty, which preferred a religion focused on gods of nature, Tian became a more abstract and impersonal idea of God. A popular representation is the Jade Deity (玉帝; Yùdì) or Jade Emperor (玉皇; Yùhuáng) (Note: The characters 玉; yu (jade), 皇; huang (emperor, sovereign, august), 王; wang (king), as well as others pertaining to the same semantic field, have a common denominator in the concept of 工; gong (work, art, craft, artisan, bladed weapon, square and compass; gnomon, "interpreter") and 巫; wu (shaman, medium) in its archaic form, with the same meaning of 卍; wan (swastika, ten thousand things, all being, universe). The character 帝; dì is rendered as "deity" or "emperor" and describes a divine principle that exerts a fatherly dominance over what it produces. A king is a man or an entity who is able to merge himself with the axis mundi, the centre of the universe, bringing its order into reality. The ancient kings or emperors of the Chinese civilisation were shamans or priests, that is to say mediators of the divine rule. The same Western terms "king" and "emperor" traditionally meant an entity capable to embody the divine rule: king etymologically means "gnomon", "generator", while emperor means "interpreter", "one who makes from within".) originally formulated by Taoists. According to classical theology he manifests in five primary forms (五方上帝; Wǔfāng Shàngdì; "Five Forms of the Highest Deity").

The 气; qi is the breath or substance of which all things are made, including inanimate matter, the living beings, thought and gods. It is the continuum energy—matter. Stephen F. Teiser (1996) translates it as "stuff" of "psychophysical stuff". Neo-Confucian thinkers such as Zhu Xi developed the idea of 理; li, the "reason", "order" of Heaven, that is to say the pattern through which the qi develops, that is the polarity of yin and yang. In Taoism the 道; Tao ("Way") denotes in one concept both the impersonal absolute Tian and its order of manifestation (li).

=== Yin, yang, gui, and shen ===
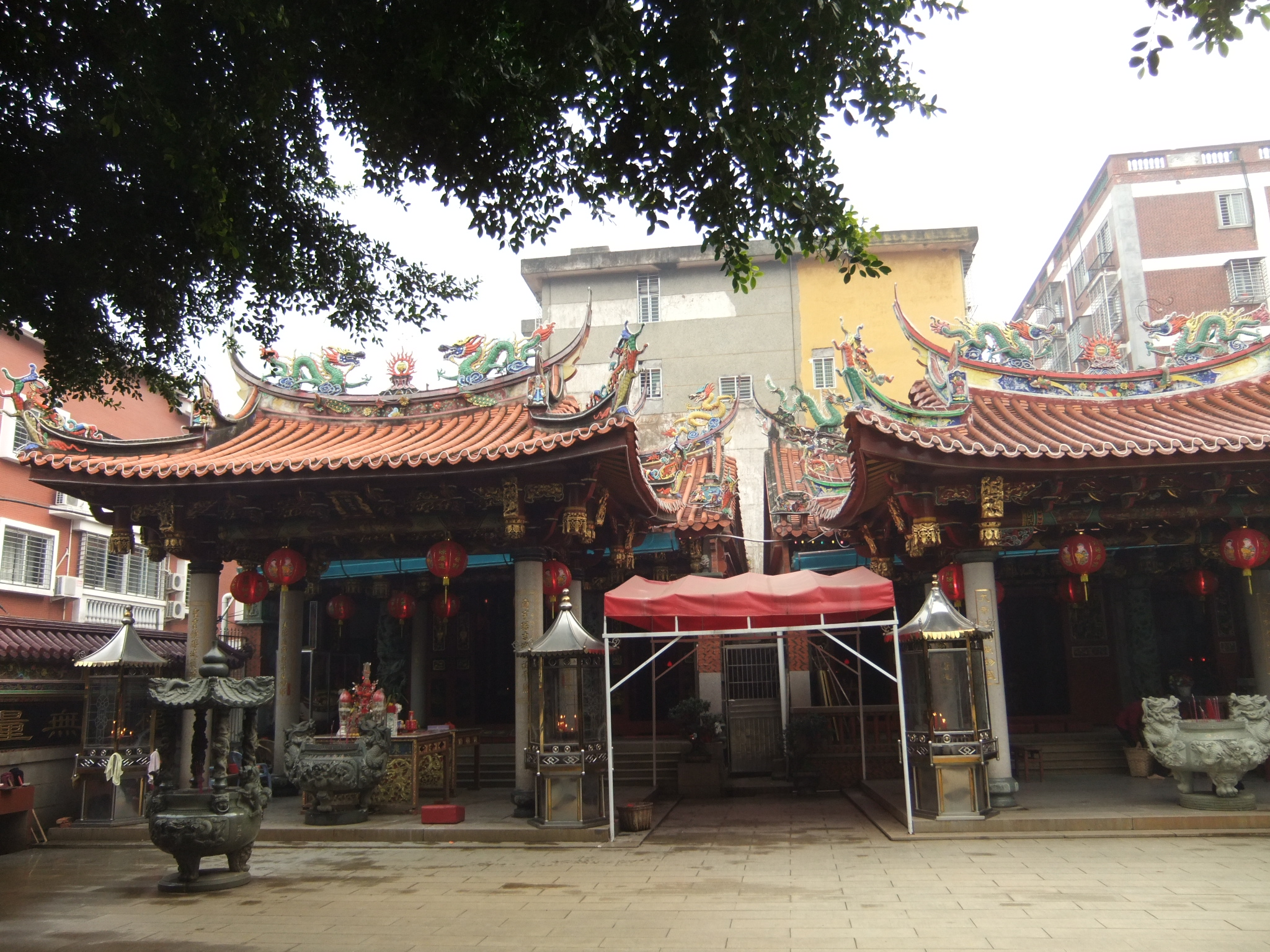
The "Numinous Palace by the Brook in the Land of Springs" (泉郡溪靈宮; Quánjùnxī línggōng) in Quanzhou, Fujian (Note: Temples are usually built in accordance with feng shui methods, which hold that any thing needs to be arranged in equilibrium with the surrounding world in order to thrive. Names of holy spaces often poetically describe their collocation within the world.)

Yin (陰; yīn) and yang (陽; yáng), whose root meanings respectively are 'shady' and 'sunny', or 'dark' and 'light', are modes of manifestation of the qi, not material things in themselves. Yin is the qi in its dense, dark, sinking, wet, condensing mode; yang denotes the light, and the bright, rising, dry, expanding modality. Described as Taiji (the 'Great Pole'), they represent the polarity and complementarity that enlivens the cosmos. They can also be conceived as 'disorder' and 'order', 'activity' or 'passivity', with action (yang) usually preferred over receptiveness (yin).

The concept of shen (神; shén; cognate of 申; shēn 'extending', 'expanding') is translated as 'gods' or 'spirits'. There are shen of nature; gods who were once people, such as the warrior Guan Yu; household gods, such as the Stove God; as well as ancestral gods (zu or zuxian). In the domain of humanity the shen is the psyche, or the power or agency within humans. They are intimately involved in the life of this world. As spirits of stars, mountains and streams, shen exert a direct influence on things, making phenomena appear and things grow or extend themselves. An early Chinese dictionary, the Shuowen Jiezi by Xu Shen, explains that they "are the spirits of Heaven" and they "draw out the ten thousand things". As forces of growth the gods are regarded as yang, opposed to a yin class of entities called gui (鬼; guǐ; cognate of 歸; guī 'return', 'contraction'), chaotic beings. A disciple of Zhu Xi noted that "between Heaven and Earth there is no thing that does not consist of yin and yang, and there is no place where yin and yang are not found. Therefore, there is no place where gods and spirits do not exist". The dragon is a symbol of yang, the principle of generation.

In Taoist and Confucian thought, the supreme God and its order and the multiplicity of shen are identified as one and the same. In the Ten Wings, a commentary to the I Ching, it is written that "one yin and one yang are called the Tao ... the unfathomable change of yin and yang is called shen". In other texts, with a tradition going back to the Han dynasty, the gods and spirits are explained to be names of yin and yang, forces of contraction and forces of growth.

While in popular thought they have conscience and personality, Neo-Confucian scholars tended to rationalise them. Zhu Xi wrote that they act according to the li. Zhang Zai wrote that they are "the inherent potential (liang neng) of the two ways of qi". Cheng Yi said that they are "traces of the creative process". Chen Chun wrote that shen and gui are expansions and contractions, going and coming, of yin and yang—qi.

=== Hun and po, and zu and xian ===
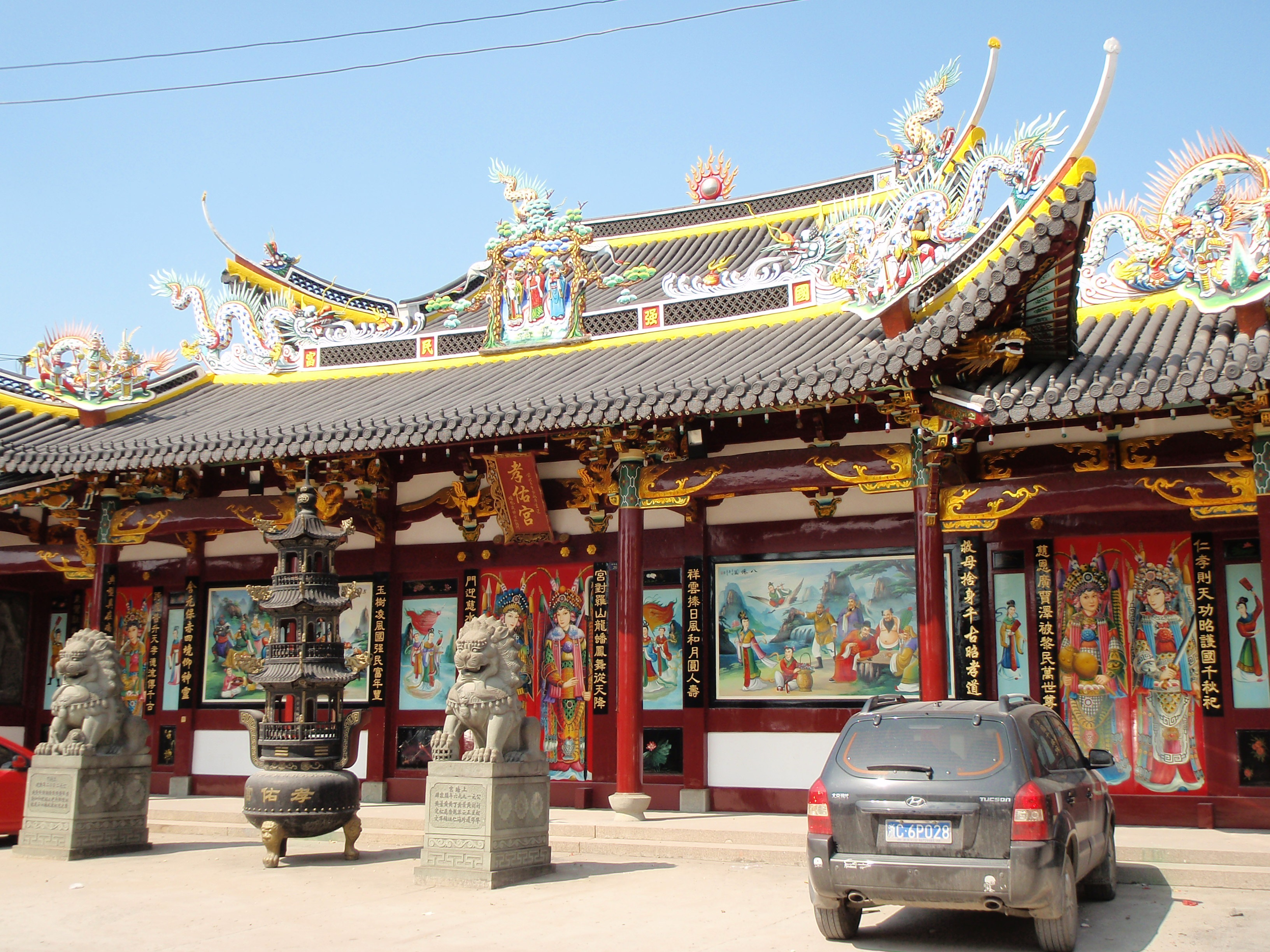
Temple of the Filial Blessing (Xiàoyòugōng) in Ouhai, Wenzhou, Zhejiang. It is a place for the worship of ancestors.

Like all things in matter, the human soul is characterised by a dialectic of yang and yin. These correspond to the hun and po (魂魄) respectively. The hun is the traditionally "masculine", yang, rational soul or mind, and the po is the traditionally "feminine", yin, animal soul that is associated with the body. hun (mind) is the soul (shen) that gives a form to the vital breath (qi) of humans, and it develops through the po, stretching and moving intelligently in order to grasp things. The po is the soul (shen) which controls the physiological and psychological activities of humans, while the hun, the shen attached to the vital breath (qi), is the soul (shen) that is totally independent of corporeal substance. The hun is independent and perpetual, and as such it never allows itself to be limited in matter. (Note: The po can be compared with the psyche or thymos of the Greek philosophy and tradition, while the hun with the pneuma or "immortal soul".) Otherwise said, the po is the "earthly" (di) soul that goes downward, while the hun is the "heavenly" (tian) soul that moves upward.

To extend life to its full potential the human shen must be cultivated, resulting in ever clearer, more luminous states of being. It can transform in the pure intelligent breath of deities. In the human psyche there's no distinction between rationality and intuition, thinking and feeling: the human being is xin (心), mind-heart. With death, while the po returns to the earth and disappears, the hun is thought to be pure awareness or qi, and is the shen to whom ancestral sacrifices are dedicated.

The shen of men who are properly cultivated and honoured after their death are upheld ancestors and progenitors (祖先; zuxian or 祖; zu). When ancestries are not properly cultivated the world falls into disruption, and they become gui. Ancestral worship is intertwined with totemism, as the earliest ancestors of an ethnic lineage are often represented as animals or associated to them.

Ancestors are means of connection with the Tian, the primordial god which does not have form. As ancestors have form, they shape the destiny of humans. Ancestors who have had a significant impact in shaping the destiny of large groups of people, creators of genetic lineages or spiritual traditions, and historical leaders who have invented crafts and institutions for the wealth of the Chinese nation (culture heroes), are exalted among the highest divine manifestations or immortal beings (仙; xian).

In fact, in the Chinese tradition there is no distinction between gods (shen) and immortal beings (xian), transcendental principles and their bodily manifestations. Gods can incarnate with a human form and human beings can reach higher spiritual states by the right way of action, that is to say by emulating the order of Heaven. Humans are considered one of the three aspects of a trinity (三才; Sāncái, "Three Powers"), the three foundations of all being; specifically, men are the medium between Heaven that engenders order and forms and Earth which receives and nourishes them. Men are endowed with the role of completing creation. (Note: By the words of the Han dynasty scholar Dong Zhongshu: "Heaven, Earth and humankind are the foundations of all living things. Heaven engenders all living things, Earth nourishes them, and humankind completes them." In the Daodejing: "Tao is great. Heaven is great. Earth is great. And the king [humankind] is also great." The concept of the Three Powers / Agents / Ultimates is furtherly discussed in Confucian commentaries of the Yijing.)

=== Bao ying and ming yun ===
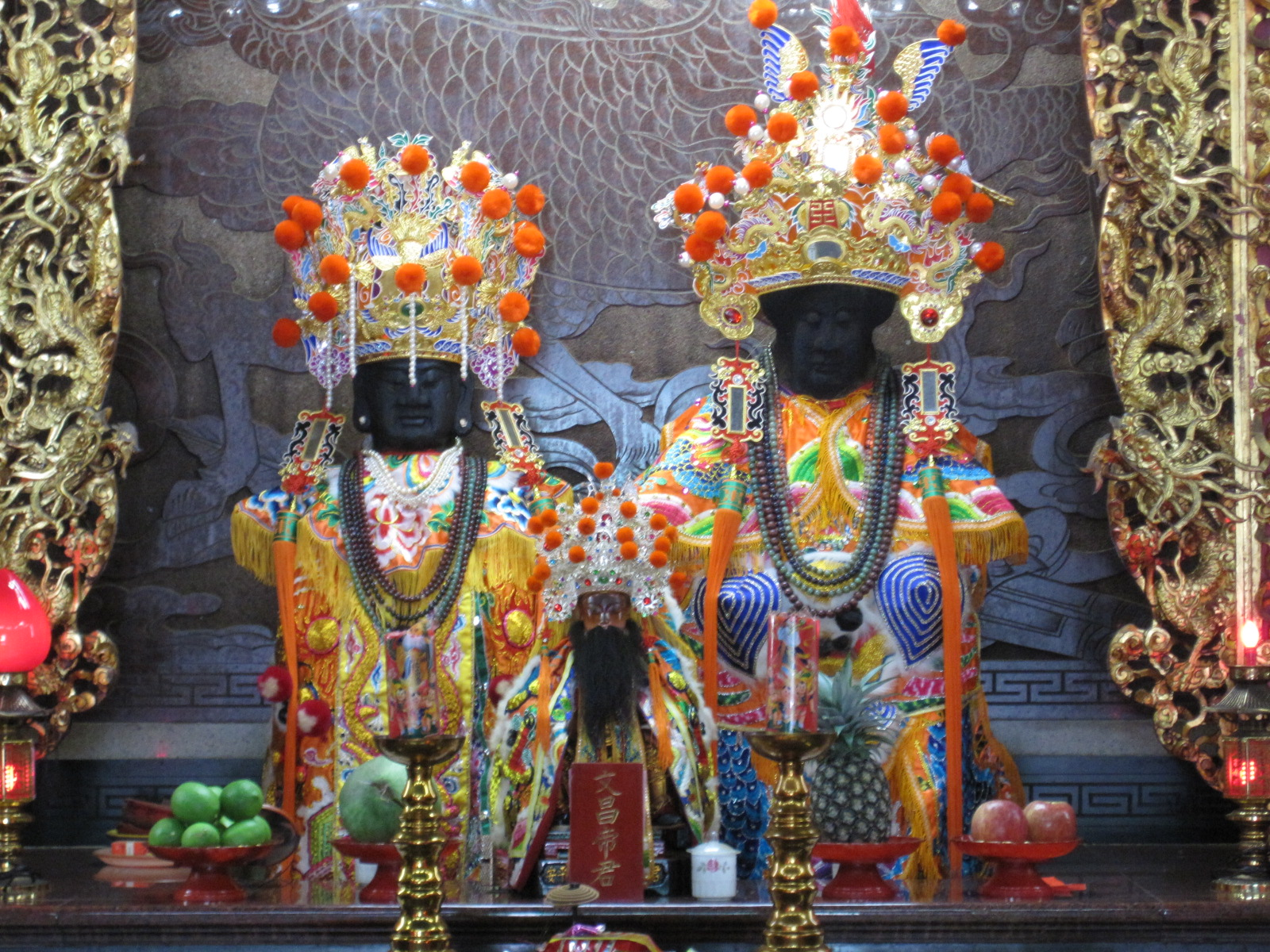
Altar to the Stone Generals, protective deities, at the Kantai Tianhou Temple in Anping, Tainan, Taiwan

The Chinese traditional concept of bao ying ("reciprocity", "retribution" or "judgement"), is inscribed in the cosmological view of an ordered world, in which all manifestations of being have an allotted span (shu) and destiny, and are rewarded according to the moral-cosmic quality of their actions. It determines fate, as written in Zhou texts: "on the doer of good, heaven sends down all blessings, and on the doer of evil, he sends down all calamities" (書經•湯誥).

The cosmic significance of bao ying is better understood by exploring other two traditional concepts of fate and meaning:

- Ming yun (命運), the personal destiny or given condition of a being in his world, in which ming is "life" or "right", the given status of life, and yun defines both "circumstance" and "individual choice"; ming is given and influenced by the transcendent force Tian (天), that is the same as the "divine right" (tianming) of ancient rulers as identified by Mencius. Personal destiny (ming yun) is thus perceived as both fixed (as life itself) and flexible, open-ended (since the individual can choose how to behave in bao ying).
- Yuan fen (緣分), "fateful coincidence", describing good and bad chances and potential relationships. Scholars K. S. Yang and D. Ho have analysed the psychological advantages of this belief: assigning causality of both negative and positive events to yuan fen reduces the conflictual potential of guilt and pride, and preserves social harmony.

Ming yun and yuan fen are linked, because what appears on the surface to be chance (either positive or negative), is part of the deeper rhythm that shapes personal life based on how destiny is directed. Recognising this connection has the result of making a person responsible for his or her actions: doing good for others spiritually improves oneself and contributes to the harmony between men and environmental gods and thus to the wealth of a human community.

These three themes of the Chinese tradition—moral reciprocity, personal destiny, fateful coincidence—are completed by a fourth notion:

- Wu (悟), "awareness" of bao ying. The awareness of one's own given condition inscribed in the ordered world produces responsibility towards oneself and others; awareness of yuan fen stirs to respond to events rather than resigning. Awareness may arrive as a gift, often unbidden, and then it evolves into a practice that the person intentionally follows.

As part of the trinity of being (the Three Powers), humans are not totally submissive to spiritual force. While under the sway of spiritual forces, humans can actively engage with them, striving to change their own fate to prove the worth of their earthly life. In the Chinese traditional view of human destiny, the dichotomy between "fatalism" and "optimism" is overcome; human beings can shape their personal destiny to grasp their real worth in the transformation of the universe, seeing their place in the alliance with the gods and with Heaven to surpass the constraints of the physical body and mind.

=== Ling and xianling—holy and numen ===
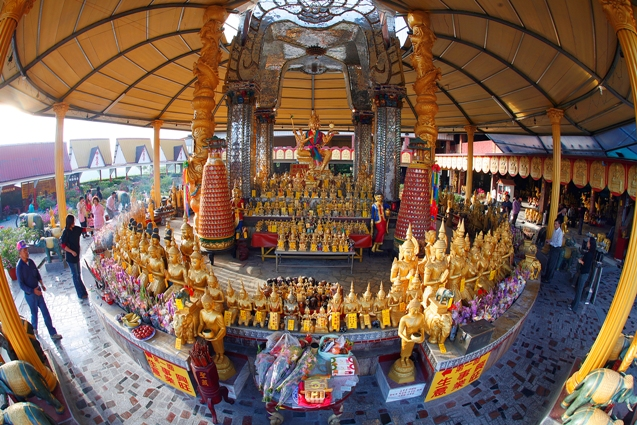
Temple of Brahma, or Simianshen (四面神 "Four-Faced God") in Chinese, in Changhua, Taiwan. The Thai-style worship of Simianshen has its origins among Thai Chinese, and has spread over the last few decades among mainland Chinese and Overseas Chinese populations.

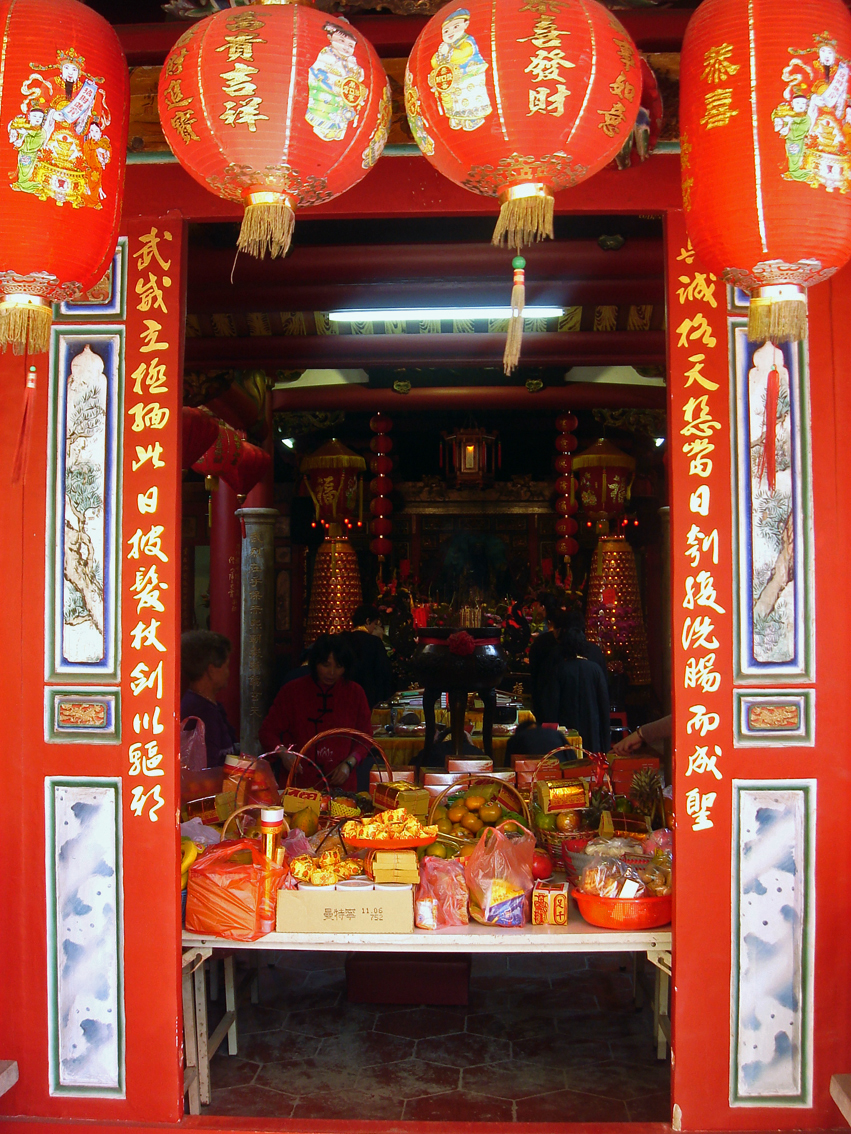
A shrine dedicated to Zhenwu in Wuqi, Taichung, Taiwan

In Chinese religion the concept of ling (靈) is the equivalent of holy and numen. Shen in the meaning of "spiritual" is a synonym. The Yijing states that "spiritual means not measured by yin and yang". Ling is the state of the "medium" of the bivalency (yin-yang), and thus it is identical with the inchoate order of creation. Things inspiring awe or wonder because they cannot be understood as either yin or yang, because they cross or disrupt the polarity and therefore cannot be conceptualised, are regarded as numinous. Entities possessing unusual spiritual characteristics, such as albino members of a species, beings that are part animal part human, or people who die in unusual ways such as suicide or on battlefields, are considered numinous.

The notion of xian ling (顯靈), variously translated as "divine efficacy, virtue" or the "numen", is important for the relationship between people and gods. It describes the manifestation, activity, of the power of a god (靈氣; ling qi, "divine energy" or "effervescence"), the evidence of the holy.

The term xian ling may be interpreted as the god revealing their presence in a particular area and temple, through events that are perceived as extraordinary, miraculous. Divine power usually manifests in the presence of a wide public. The "value" of human deities (xian) is judged according to their efficacy. The perceived effectiveness of a deity to protect or bless also determines how much they should be worshipped, how big a temple should be built in their honour, and what position in the broader pantheon they would attain.

Zavidovskaya (2012) has studied how the incentive of temple restorations since the 1980s in northern China was triggered by numerous alleged instances of gods becoming "active" and "returning", reclaiming their temples and place in society. She mentions the example of a Chenghuang Temple in Yulin, Shaanxi, that was turned into a granary during the Cultural Revolution; it was restored to its original function in the 1980s after seeds stored within were always found to have rotted. This phenomenon, which locals attributed to the god Chenghuang, was taken a sign to empty his residence of grain and allow him back in. The ling qi, divine energy, is believed to accumulate in certain places, temples, making them holy. Temples with a longer history are considered holier than newly built ones, which still need to be filled by divine energy.

Another example Zavidovskaya cites is the cult of the god Zhenwu in Congluo Yu, Shanxi; the god's temples were in ruins and the cult inactive until the mid-1990s, when a man with terminal cancer, in his last hope prayed (拜; bai) to Zhenwu. The man began to miraculously recover each passing day, and after a year he was completely healed. As thanksgiving, he organised an opera performance in the god's honour. A temporary altar with a statue of Zhenwu and a stage for the performance were set up in an open space at the foot of a mountain. During the course of the opera, large white snakes appeared, passive and unafraid of the people, seemingly watching the opera; the snakes were considered by locals to be incarnations of Zhenwu, come to watch the opera held in his honour.

Within temples, it is common to see banners bearing the phrase "if the heart is sincere, the god will reveal their power" (心誠神靈; xin cheng shen ling). The relationship between people and gods is an exchange of favour. This implies the belief that gods respond to the entreaties of the believer if their religious fervour is sincere (誠心; cheng xin). If a person believes in the god's power with all their heart and expresses piety, the gods are confident in their faith and reveal their efficacious power. At the same time, for faith to strengthen in the devotee's heart, the deity has to prove their efficacy. In exchange for divine favours, a faithful honours the deity with vows (還願; huan yuan or 許願; xu yuan), through individual worship, reverence and respect (敬神; jing shen).

The most common display of divine power is the cure of diseases after a believer piously requests aid. Another manifestation is granting a request of children. The deity may also manifest through mediumship, entering the body of a shaman-medium and speaking through them. There have been cases of people curing illnesses "on behalf of a god" (替神治病; ti shen zhi bing). Gods may also speak to people when they are asleep (託夢; tuomeng).

== Sociological typology ==
Wu Hsin-Chao (2014) distinguishes four kinds of Chinese traditional religious organisation: ancestry worship; deity worship; secret societies; and folk religious sects.

=== Types of indigenous—ethnic religion ===
==== Worship of local and national deities ====
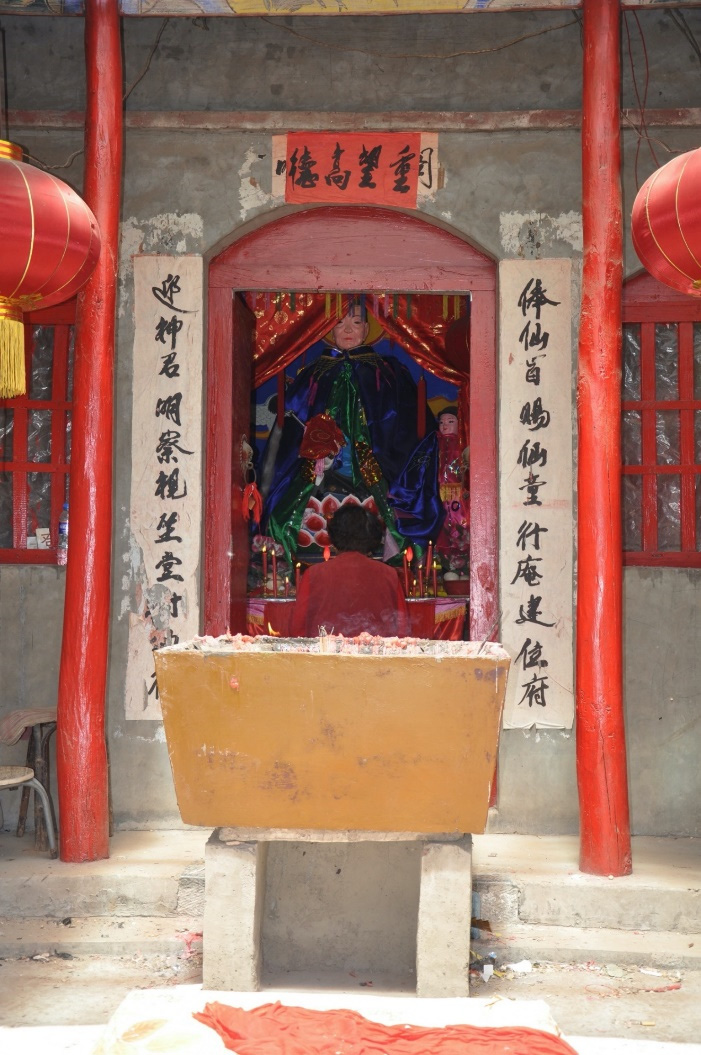
Shrine of the Bald-Headed Grandma (禿奶奶廟; Tunainai miao) in Jiacun, Changzhi, Shanxi. The Bald-headed Grandma is the divine name for a local virtuous woman who was deified after death in 1944 and worshipped as a patron god of women in the region.

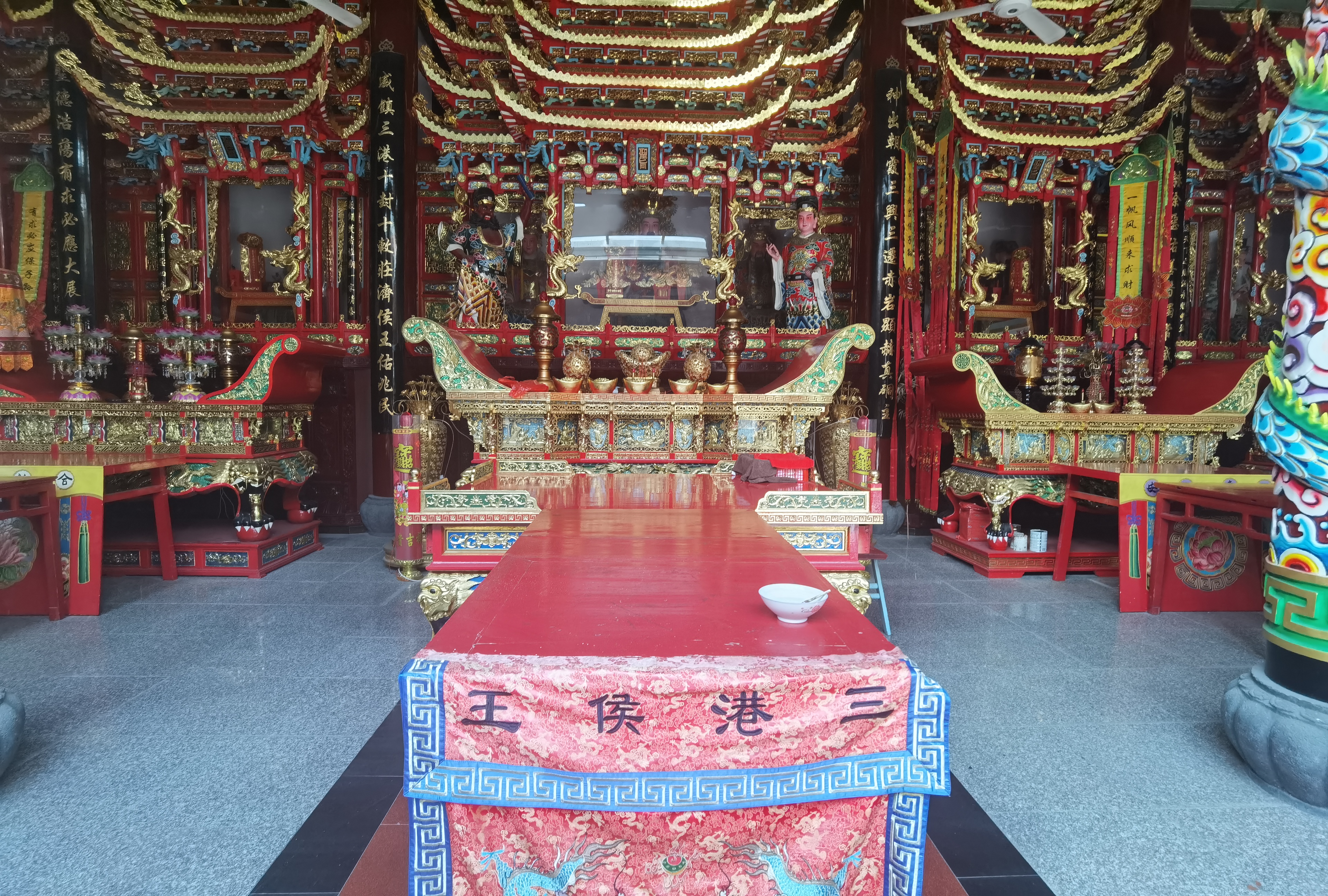
Altar of the Sacred King of the Three (三港聖王; Sangang Shengwang) at Yangfu Mountain of Zhejiang. Sacred King of the Three was a legendary figure in Rui'an and emerged as a local water deity.

Chinese religion in its communal expression involves the worship of gods that are the generative power and tutelary spirit (genius loci) of a locality or a certain aspect of nature (for example water gods, river gods, fire gods, mountain gods), or of gods that are common ancestors of a village, a larger identity, or the Chinese nation (Shennong, Huangdi, Pangu). Generally, gods can be asked for favour and petitioned. They have human-like quirks and their aid is not viewed as guaranteed, although generally gods are viewed as upholding basic moral values like honesty and loyalty.

The social structure of this religion is the 神社; shénshè (literally "society of a god"), synonymous with 社會; shehui, in which 社; shè originally meant the altar of a community's earth god, while 會; huì means "association", "assembly", "church" or "gathering". This type of religious trusts can be dedicated to a god which is bound to a single village or temple or to a god which has a wider following, in multiple villages, provinces or even a national importance. Mao Zedong distinguished "god associations", "village communities" and "temple associations" in his analysis of religious trusts. In his words: "every kind and type of god [shen] can have an association [hui]", for example the Zhaogong Association, the Guanyin Association, the Guangong Association, the Dashen Association, the Bogong Association, the Wenchang Association, and the like. Within the category of hui Mao also distinguished the sacrifice associations (醮會; jiàohuì) which make sacrifices in honour of gods.

These societies organise gatherings and festivals (廟會; miaohui) participated by members of the whole village or larger community on the occasions of what are believed to be the birthdays of the gods or other events, or to seek protection from droughts, epidemics, and other disasters. Such festivals invoke the power of the gods for practical goals to "summon blessings and drive away harm". Special devotional currents within this framework can be identified by specific names such as Mazuism (媽祖教; Māzǔjiào), Wang Ye worship, or the cult of the Silkworm Mother.

This type of religion is prevalent in north China, where lineage religion is absent, private, or historically present only within families of southern origin, and patrilineal ties are based on seniority, and villages are composed of people with different surnames. In this context, the deity societies or temple societies function as poles of the civil organism. Often deity societies incorporate entire villages; this is the reason why in north China there can be found many villages which are named after deities and their temples, for example Léishénmiào (雷神廟; "[Village of the] Temple of the Thunder God") or Mǎshénmiàocūn (馬神廟村; "Village of the Temple of the Horse God").

==== Lineage religion ====
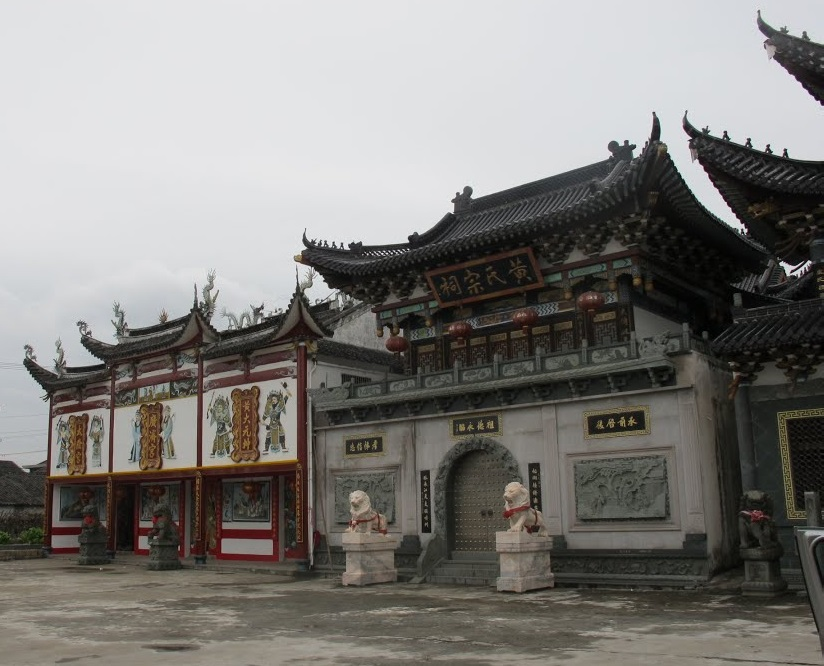
Guanji temple (left) and Huang ancestral shrine (right) in Wenzhou, Zhejiang

Another dimension of the Chinese folk religion is based on family or genealogical worship of deities and ancestors in family altars or private temples (私廟; simiao or 家廟; jiamiao), or ancestral shrines (祠堂; citang or 宗祠; zongci, or also 祖廟; zumiao). Kinship associations or churches (宗族協會; zōngzú xiéhuì), congregating people with the same surname and belonging to the same kin, are the social expression of this religion: these lineage societies build temples where the deified ancestors of a certain group (for example the Chens or the Lins) are enshrined and worshiped. These temples serve as centres of aggregation for people belonging to the same lineage, and the lineage body may provide a context of identification and mutual assistance for individual persons.

The construction of large and elaborate ancestral temples traditionally represents a kin's wealth, influence and achievement. Scholar K. S. Yang has explored the ethno-political dynamism of this form of religion, through which people who become distinguished for their value and virtue are considered immortal and receive posthumous divine titles, and are believed to protect their descendants, inspiring a mythological lore for the collective memory of a family or kin.

If their temples and their deities enshrined acquire popularity they are considered worthy of the virtue of ling, "efficacy". Worship of ancestors (敬祖; jingzu) is observed nationally with large-scale rituals on Qingming Festival and other holidays.

This type of religion prevails in south China, where lineage bonds are stronger and the patrilineal hierarchy is not based upon seniority, and access to corporate resources held by a lineage is based upon the equality of all the lines of descent.

=== Philosophical and ritual modalities ===
==== Wuism and shamanic traditions ====
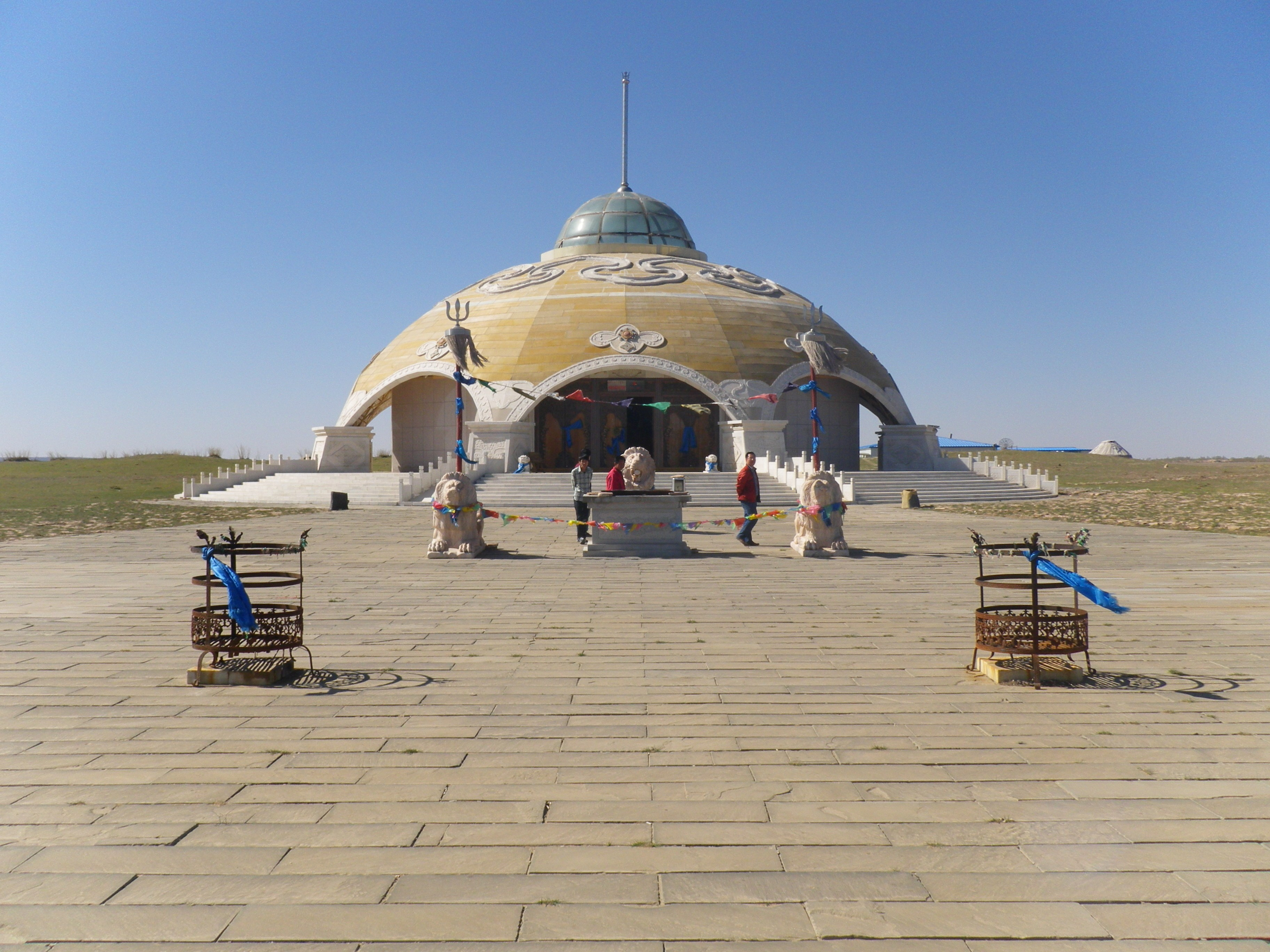
Temple of the White Sulde of Genghis Khan in the town of Uxin in Inner Mongolia, in the Mu Us Desert. The worship of Genghis is shared by Chinese and Mongolian folk religion. (Note: The White Sulde (White Spirit) is one of the two spirits of Genghis Khan (the other being the Black Sulde), represented either as his white or yellow horse or as a fierce warrior riding this horse. In its interior, the temple enshrines a statue of Genghis Khan (at the center) and four of his men on each side (the total making nine, a symbolic number in Mongolian culture), there is an altar where offerings to the godly men are made, and three white suldes made with white horse hair. From the central sulde there are strings which hold tied light blue pieces of cloth with a few white ones. The wall is covered with all the names of the Mongol kins. The Chinese worship Genghis as the ancestral god of the Yuan dynasty.)

"The extent to which shamanism pervaded ancient Chinese society", says Paul R. Goldin (2005), "is a matter of scholarly dispute, but there can be no doubt that many communities relied upon the unique talents of shamans for their quotidian spiritual needs". The Chinese usage distinguishes the Chinese wu tradition or "Wuism" as it was called by Jan Jakob Maria de Groot (巫教; wūjiào; properly shamanic, with control over the gods) from the tongji tradition (童乩; mediumship, without control of the godly movement), and from non-Han Chinese Altaic shamanisms (薩滿教; sàmǎnjiào) that are practised in northern provinces.

According to Andreea Chirita (2014), Confucianism itself, with its emphasis on hierarchy and ancestral rituals, derived from the shamanic discourse of the Shang dynasty. What Confucianism did was to marginalise the "dysfunctional" features of old shamanism. However, shamanic traditions continued uninterrupted within the folk religion and found precise and functional forms within Taoism.

In the Shang and Zhou dynasty, shamans had a role in the political hierarchy, and were represented institutionally by the Ministry of Rites (大宗伯). The emperor was considered the supreme shaman, intermediating between the three realms of heaven, earth and man. The mission of a shaman (巫; wu) is "to repair the dis-functionalities occurred in nature and generated after the sky had been separated from earth":

The female shamans called wu as well as the male shamans called xi represent the voice of spirits, repair the natural dis-functions, foretell the future based on dreams and the art of divination ... "a historical science of the future", whereas shamans are able to observe the yin and the yang ...

Since the 1980s the practice and study of shamanism has undergone a massive revival in Chinese religion as a means to repair the world to a harmonious whole after industrialisation. Shamanism is viewed by many scholars as the foundation for the emergence of civilisation, and the shaman as "teacher and spirit" of peoples. The Chinese Society for Shamanic Studies was founded in Jilin City in 1988.

Nuo folk religion is a system of the Chinese folk religion with distinct institutions and cosmology present especially in central-southern China. It arose as an exorcistic religious movement, and it is interethnic but also intimately connected to the Tujia people.

==== Confucianism, Taoism and orders of ritual masters ====
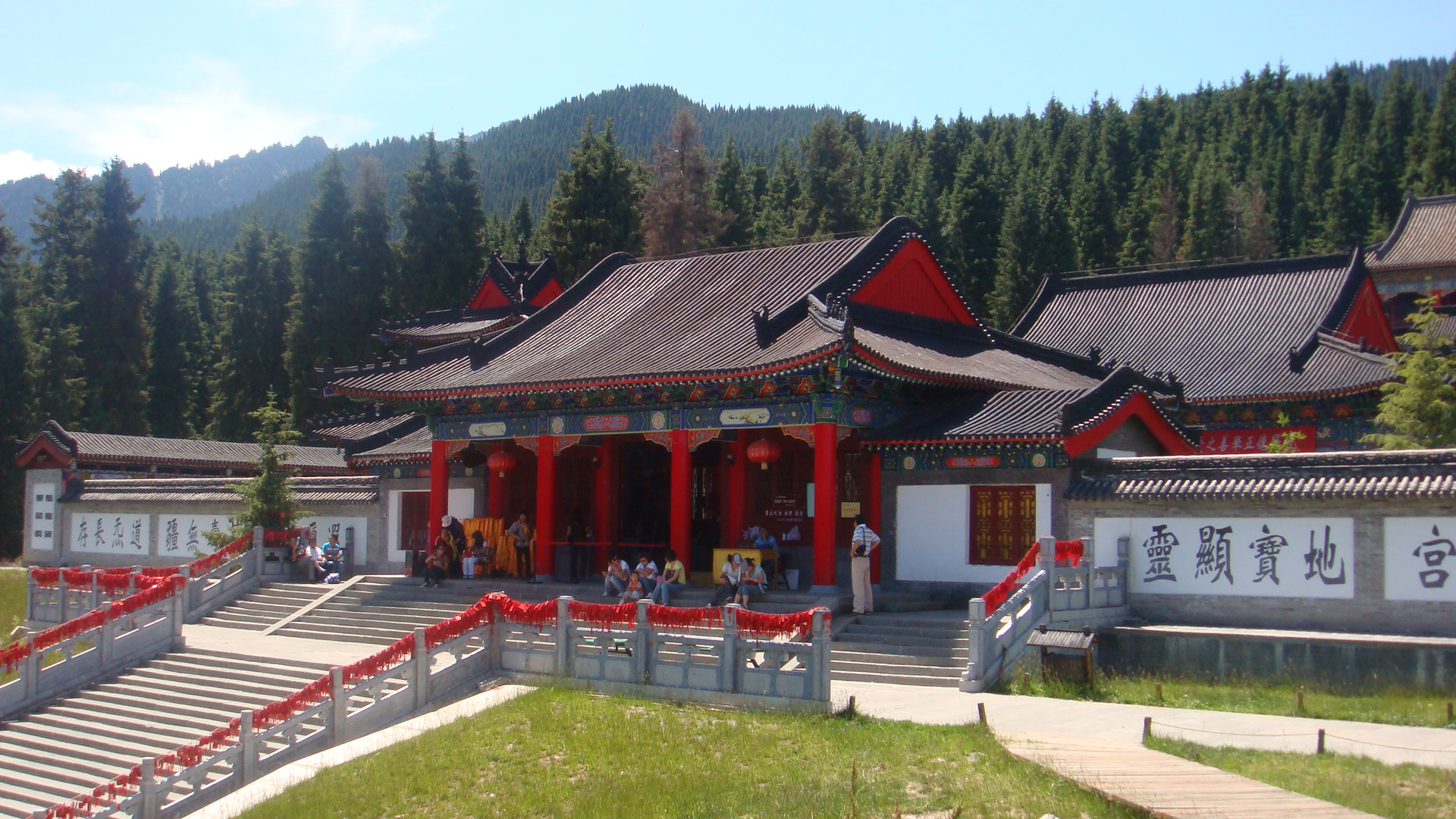
Temple of Fortune and Longevity, at the Heavenly Lake of Tianshan in Fukang, Changji, Xinjiang. It is an example of Taoist temple which hosts various chapels dedicated to popular gods. (Note: The main axis of the Taoist Temple of Fortune and Longevity (福壽觀; Fúshòuguān) has a Temple of the Three Patrons (三皇殿; Sānhuángdiàn) and a Temple of the Three Purities (三清殿; Sānqīngdiàn, the orthodox gods of Taoist theology). Side chapels include a Temple of the God of Wealth (財神殿; Cáishéndiàn), a Temple of the Lady (娘娘殿; Niángniángdiàn), a Temple of the Eight Immortals (八仙殿; Bāxiāndiàn), and a Temple of the (God of) Thriving Culture (文昌殿; Wénchāngdiàn). The Fushou Temple belongs to the Taoist Church and was built in 2005 on the site of a former Buddhist temple, the Iron Tiles Temple, which stood there until it was destituted and destroyed in 1950. Part of the roof tiles of the new temples are from the ruins of the former temple excavated in 2002.)

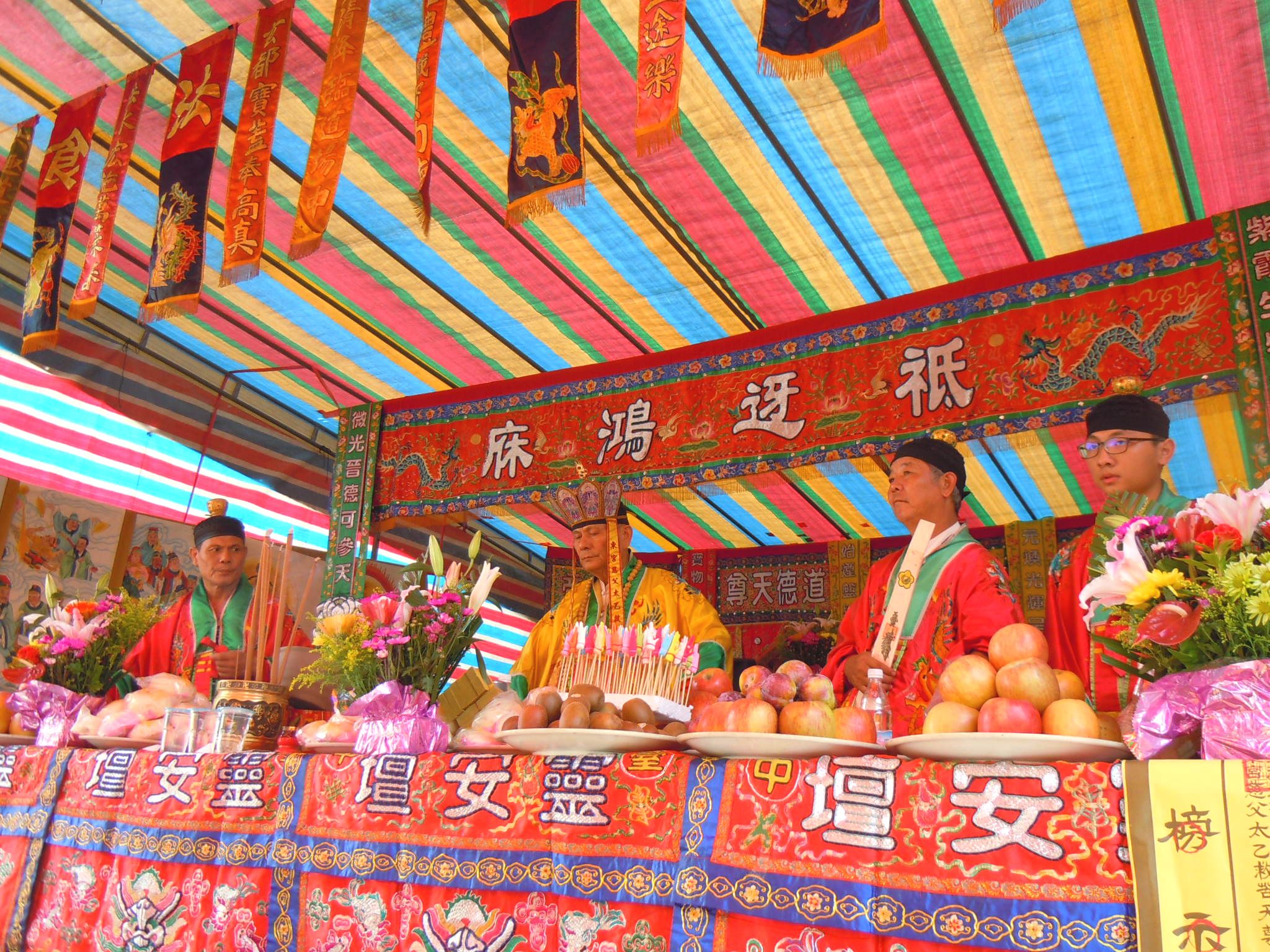
Folk ritual masters conducting a ceremony

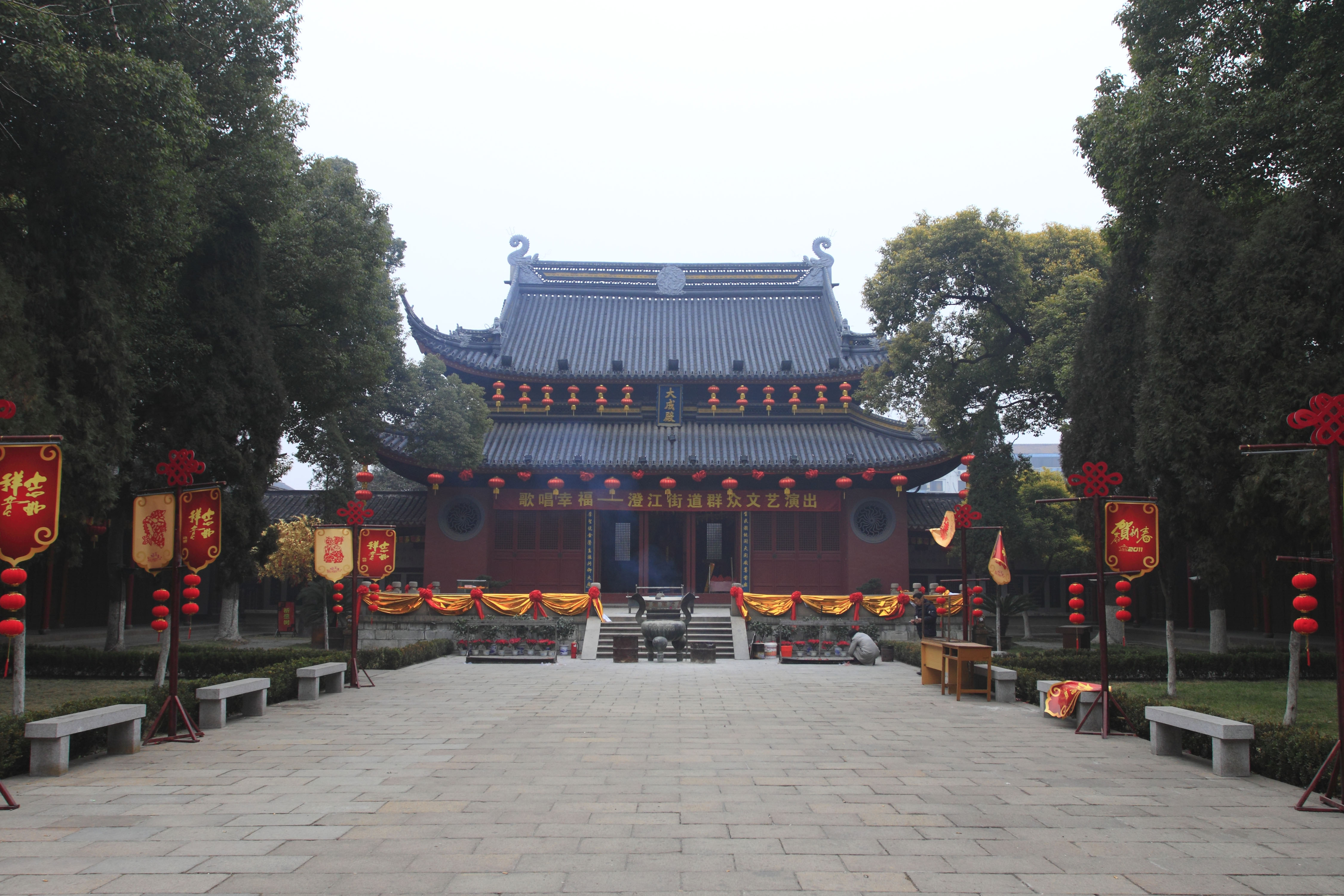
The Temple of the God of Culture (文廟; wénmiào) of Jiangyin, Wuxi, Jiangsu. In this temple the Wéndì (文帝; "God of Culture") enshrined is Confucius.

Confucianism and Taoism—which are formalised, ritual, doctrinal or philosophical traditions—can be considered both as embedded within the larger category of Chinese religion, or as separate religions. In fact, one can practise certain folk cults and espouse the tenets of Confucianism as a philosophical framework, Confucian theology instructing to uphold the moral order through the worship of gods and ancestors that is the way of connecting to the Tian and awakening to its harmony (li, "rite").

Folk temples and ancestral shrines on special occasions may choose Confucian liturgy (that is called 儒; rú, or sometimes 正統; zhèngtǒng, meaning "orthoprax" ritual style) led by Confucian "sages of rites" (禮生; lǐshēng) who in many cases are the elders of a local community. Confucian liturgies are alternated with Taoist liturgies and popular ritual styles.

There are many organised groups of the folk religion that adopt Confucian liturgy and identity, for example the Way of the Gods according to the Confucian Tradition or phoenix churches (Luanism), or the Confucian churches, schools and fellowships such as the Yīdān xuétáng (一耽學堂) of Beijing, the Mèngmǔtáng (孟母堂) of Shanghai, the Confucian Fellowship (儒教道壇; Rújiào Dàotán) in northern Fujian, and ancestral temples of the Kong (Confucius) lineage operating as well as Confucian-teaching churches. In November 2015 a national Church of Confucius was established with the contribution of many Confucian leaders.

Scholar and Taoist priest Kristofer Schipper defines Taoism as a "liturgical framework" for the development of local religion. Some currents of Taoism are deeply interwoven with the Chinese folk religion, especially the Zhengyi school, developing aspects of local cults within their doctrines; however, Taoists always highlight the distinction between their traditions and those which are not Taoist. Priests of Taoism are called daoshi (道士), literally meaning "masters of the Tao", otherwise commonly translated as the "Taoists", as common followers and folk believers who are not part of Taoist orders are not identified as such.

Taoists of the Zhengyi school, who are called sǎnjū dàoshi (散居道士) or huǒjū dàoshi (火居道士), respectively meaning "scattered daoshi" and "daoshi living at home (hearth)", because they can get married and perform the profession of priests as a part-time occupation, may perform rituals of offering (jiao), thanks-giving, propitiation, exorcism and rites of passage for local communities' temples and private homes. Local gods of local cultures are often incorporated into their altars. The Zhengyi Taoists are trained by other priests of the same sect, and historically received formal ordination by the Celestial Master, although the 63rd Celestial Master Zhang Enpu fled to Taiwan in the 1940s during the Chinese Civil War.

Lineages of ritual masters (法師; fashi), also referred to as practitioners of "Faism", also called "Folk Taoism" or (in southeast China) "Red Taoism", operate within the Chinese folk religion but outside any institution of official Taoism. The ritual masters, who have the same role of the sanju daoshi within the fabric of society, are not considered Taoist priests by the daoshi of Taoism who trace their lineage to the Celestial Masters and by Taoists officially registered with the state Taoist Church. Fashi are defined as of "kataphatic" (filling) character in opposition to professional Taoists who are "kenotic" (of emptying, or apophatic, character).

=== Organised folk religious sects ===
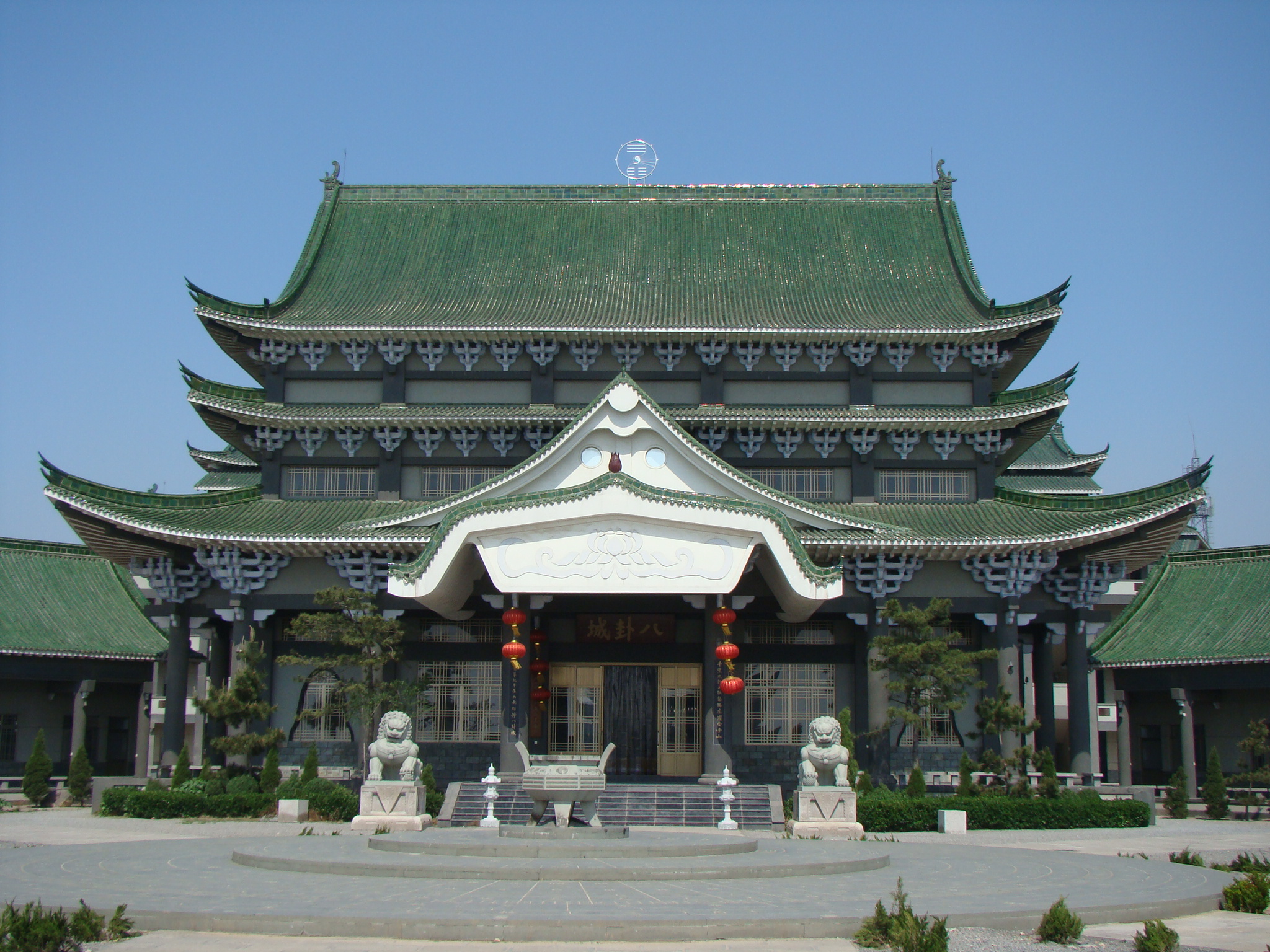
The City of the Eight Symbols in Qi, Hebi, is the headquarters of the Weixinist Church in Henan.

China has a long history of sect traditions characterised by a soteriological and eschatological character, often called "salvationist religions" (救度宗教; jiùdù zōngjiào). They emerged from the common religion but are not part of the lineage cult of ancestors and progenitors, nor the communal deity religion of village temples, neighbourhood, corporations, or national temples.

Prasenjit Duara has termed them "redemptive societies" (救世團體; jiùshì tuántǐ), while modern Chinese scholarship describes them as "folk religious sects" (民間宗教; mínjiān zōngjiào, 民間教門; mínjiān jiàomén or 民间教派; mínjiān jiàopài), abandoning the derogatory term used by imperial officials, xiéjiào (邪教), "evil religion".

They are characterised by several elements, including egalitarianism; foundation by a charismatic figure; direct divine revelation; a millenarian eschatology and voluntary path of salvation; an embodied experience of the numinous through healing and cultivation; and an expansive orientation through good deeds, evangelism and philanthropy. Their practices are focused on improving morality, body cultivation, and recitation of scriptures.

Many of the redemptive religions of the 20th and 21st century aspire to become the repository of the entirety of the Chinese tradition in the face of Western modernism and materialism. This group of religions includes Yiguandao and other sects belonging to the Xiantiandao (先天道 "Way of Former Heaven"), Jiugongdao (九宮道 "Way of the Nine Palaces"), various proliferations of the Luo teaching, the Zaili teaching, and the more recent De teaching, Weixinist, Xuanyuan and Tiandi teachings, the latter two focused respectively on the worship of Huangdi and the universal God. Also, the qigong schools are developments of the same religious context.

These folk sectarian offer different world views and compete for influence. To take one example, Yiguandao focuses on personal salvation through inner work and considers itself the most valid "Way of Heaven" (天道; Tiāndào). Yiguandao offers its own "Way of Former Heaven" (先天道; Xiāntiāndào), that is, a cosmological definition of the state of things prior to creation, in unity with God. It regards the other Luanism, a cluster of churches which focus on social morality through refined Confucian ritual to worship the gods, as the "Way of Later Heaven" (後天道; Hòutiāndào), that is the cosmological state of created things.

These movements were banned in the early Republican China and later Communist China. Many of them still remain illegal, underground or unrecognised in China, while others—specifically the De teaching, Tiandi teachings, Xuanyuan teaching, Weixinism and Yiguandao—have developed cooperation with mainland China's academic and non-governmental organisations. The Sanyi teaching is an organised folk religion founded in the 16th century, present in the Putian region (Xinghua) of Fujian where it is legally recognised. Some of these sects began to register as branches of the state Taoist Association since the 1990s.

A further distinctive type of sects of the folk religion, that are possibly the same as the positive "secret sects", are the martial sects. They combine two aspects: the wénchǎng (文場; "cultural field"), that is the doctrinal aspect characterised by elaborate cosmologies, theologies, initiatory and ritual patterns, and that is usually kept secretive; and the wǔchǎng (武場; "martial field"), that is the body cultivation practice and that is usually the "public face" of the sect. They were outlawed by Ming imperial edicts that continued to be enforced until the fall of the Qing dynasty in the 20th century. An example of martial sect is Meihuaism (梅花教; Méihuājiào; "Plum Flowers"), that has become very popular throughout northern China. In Taiwan, virtually all of the "redemptive societies" operate freely since the late 1980s.

==== Tiandi teachings ====
The Tiandi teachings are a religion that encompasses two branches, the Holy Church of the Heavenly Virtue (天德聖教; Tiāndé shèngjiào) and the Church of the Heavenly Deity (天帝教; Tiāndìjiào), both emerged from the teachings of Xiao Changming and Li Yujie, disseminated in the early 20th century. The latter is actually an outgrowth of the former established in the 1980s.

The religions focus on the worship of Tiandi (天帝), the "Heavenly Deity" or "Heavenly Emperor", on health through the proper cultivation of qi, and teach a style of qigong named Tianren qigong. According to scholars, Tiandi teachings derive from the Taoist tradition of Huashan, where Li Yujie studied for eight years. The Church of the Heavenly Deity is very active both in Taiwan and mainland China, where it has high-level links.

==== Weixinism ====
Weixinism (唯心聖教; Wéixīn shèngjiào; 'Holy Religion of the Only Heart' or 唯心教; Wéixīnjiào) is a religion primarily focused on the "orthodox lineages of Yijing and feng shui", the Hundred Schools of Thought, and worship of the "three great ancestors" (Huangdi, Yandi and Chiyou). The movement promotes the restoration of the authentic roots of the Chinese civilization and Chinese unification.

The Weixinist Church, whose headquarters are in Taiwan, is also active in Mainland China in the key birthplaces of the Chinese culture. It has links with the government of Henan where it has established the "City of Eight Trigrams" templar complex on Yunmeng Mountain (of the Yan Mountains), and it has also built temples in Hebei.

=== Geographic and ethnic variations ===
==== North and south divides ====
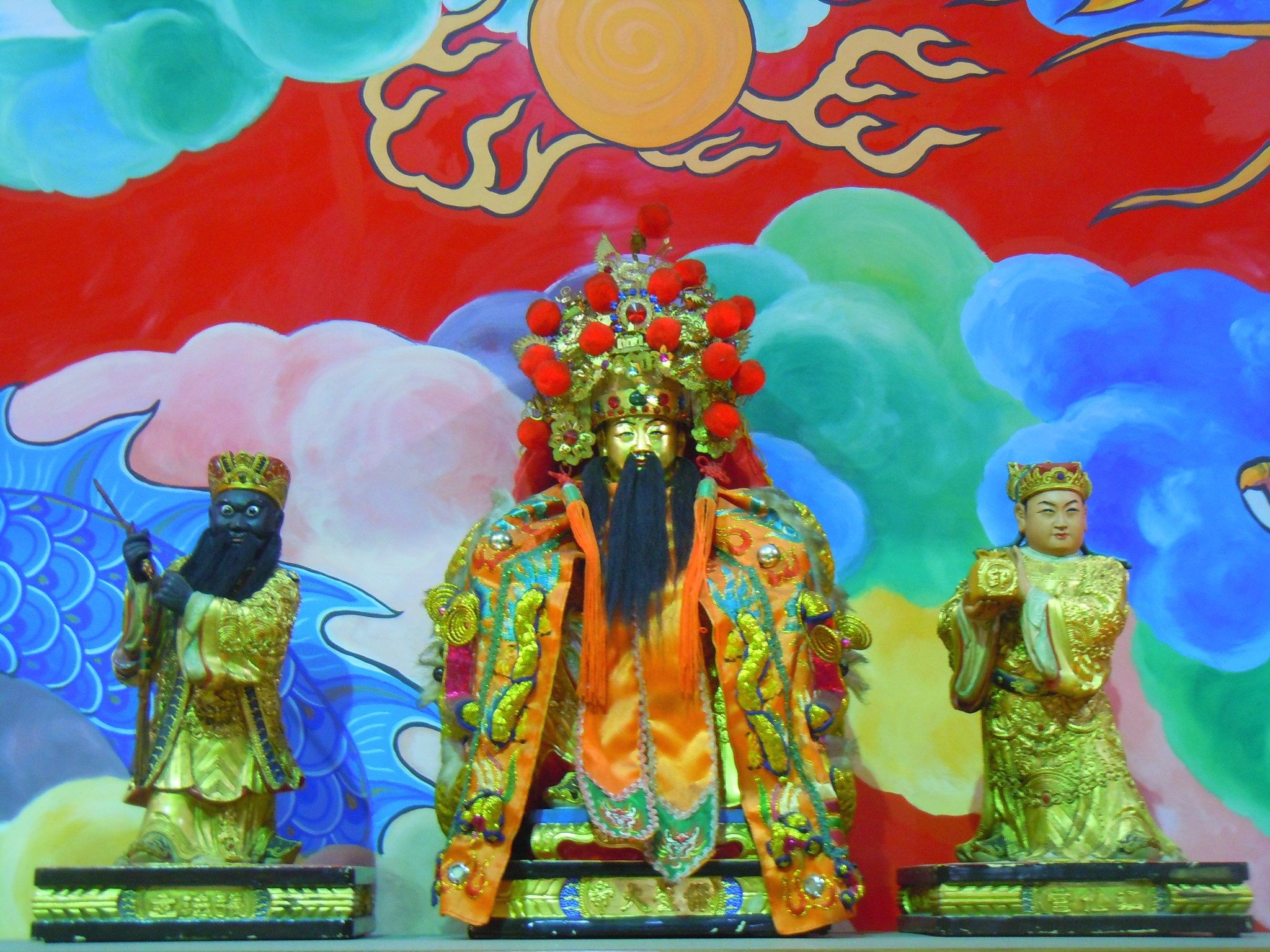
Altar to Baoshengdadi, whose cult is mostly Fujianese and Taiwanese

Recent scholarly works have found basic differences between north and south folk religion. Folk religion of southern and southeastern provinces is focused on the lineages and their churches (宗族協會; zōngzú xiéhuì) focusing on ancestral gods, while the folk religion of central-northern China (North China Plain) hinges on the communal worship of tutelary deities of creation and nature as identity symbols by villages populated by families of different surnames. They are structured into "communities of the god(s)" (神社; shénshè, or 會; huì, "association"), which organise temple ceremonies (廟會; miaohui), involving processions and pilgrimages, and led by indigenous ritual masters (fashi) who are often hereditary and linked to secular authority. (Note: Overmyer (2009), p. 73, says that from the late 19th to the 20th century few professional priests (i.e. licensed Taoists) were involved in local religion in the central and northern provinces of China, and discusses various types of folk ritual specialists including: the 樂戶; yuehu, the 主禮; zhuli (p. 74), the 神家; shenjia ("godly families", hereditary specialists of gods and their rites; p. 77), then (p. 179) the yinyang or fengshui masters (as "... folk Zhengyi Daoists of the Lingbao scriptural tradition, living as ordinary peasants. They earn their living both as a group from performing public rituals, and individually [...] by doing geomancy and calendrical consultations for fengshui and auspicious days"; (quoting: Jones, S. (2007). Ritual and Music of North China: Shawm Bands in Shanxi. doi:10.4324/9781315244082. ISBN 9781315244082.). He also describes shamans or media known by different names: 馬裨; mapi, 巫婆; wupo, 神嬤嬤; shen momo or 神漢; shen han (p. 87); 香道的; xingdao de ("practitioners of the incense way"; p. 85); village 香頭; xiangtou ("incense heads"; p. 86); 馬童; matong (the same as southern jitong), either 巫神; wushen (possessed by gods) or 神官; shenguan (possessed by immortals; pp. 88–89); or "godly sages" (神聖; shensheng; p. 91). Further (p. 76), he discusses for example the 賽; sai, ceremonies of thanksgiving to the gods in Shanxi with roots in the Song era, whose leaders very often corresponded to local political authorities. This pattern continues today with former village Communist Party secretaries elected as temple association bosses (p. 83). He concludes (p. 92): "In sum, since at least the early twentieth century the majority of local ritual leaders in north China have been products of their own or nearby communities. They have special skills in organization, ritual performance or interaction with the gods, but none are full-time ritual specialists; they have all 'kept their day jobs'! As such they are exemplars of ordinary people organizing and carrying out their own cultural traditions, persistent traditions with their own structure, functions and logic that deserve to be understood as such.")

Northern and southern folk religions also have a different pantheon, of which the northern one is composed of more ancient gods of Chinese mythology. Furthermore, folk religious sects have historically been more successful in the central plains and in the northeastern provinces than in southern China, and central-northern folk religion shares characteristics of some of the sects, such as the heavy importance of mother goddess worship and shamanism, as well as their scriptural transmission. Confucian churches as well have historically found much resonance among the population of the northeast; in the 1930s the Universal Church of the Way and its Virtue alone aggregated at least 25% of the population of the state of Manchuria and contemporary Shandong has been analysed as an area of rapid growth of folk Confucian groups.

Along the southeastern coast, ritual functions of the folk religion are reportedly dominated by Taoism, both in registered and unregistered forms (Zhengyi Taoism and unrecognised fashi orders), which since the 1990s has developed quickly in the area.

Goossaert talks of this distinction, although recognising it as an oversimplification, of a "Taoist south" and a "village-religion/Confucian centre-north", with the northern context also characterised by important orders of "folk Taoist" ritual masters, one of which are the 陰陽生; yīnyángshēng ("sages of yin and yang"), and sectarian traditions, and also by a low influence of Buddhism and official Taoism.

Northeast China folk religion has unique characteristics deriving from the interaction of Han religion with Tungus and Manchu shamanisms; these include chūmǎxiān (出馬仙; "riding for the immortals") shamanism, the worship of foxes and other zoomorphic deities, and the Fox Gods (狐神; Húshén)—Great Lord of the Three Foxes (胡三太爺; Húsān Tàiyé) and the Great Lady of the Three Foxes (胡三太奶; Húsān Tàinǎi)—at the head of pantheons. Otherwise, in the religious context of Inner Mongolia there has been a significant integration of Han Chinese into the traditional folk religion of the region.

There has been an assimilation of deities from Tibetan folk religion, especially wealth gods. In Tibet, across broader western China, and in Inner Mongolia, there has been a growth of the cult of Gesar with the explicit support of the Chinese government, a cross-ethnic Han-Tibetan, Mongol and Manchu deity (the Han identify him as an aspect of the god of war analogically with Guandi) and culture hero whose mythology is embodied as a culturally important epic poem.

==== "Taoised" indigenous religions of ethnic minorities ====
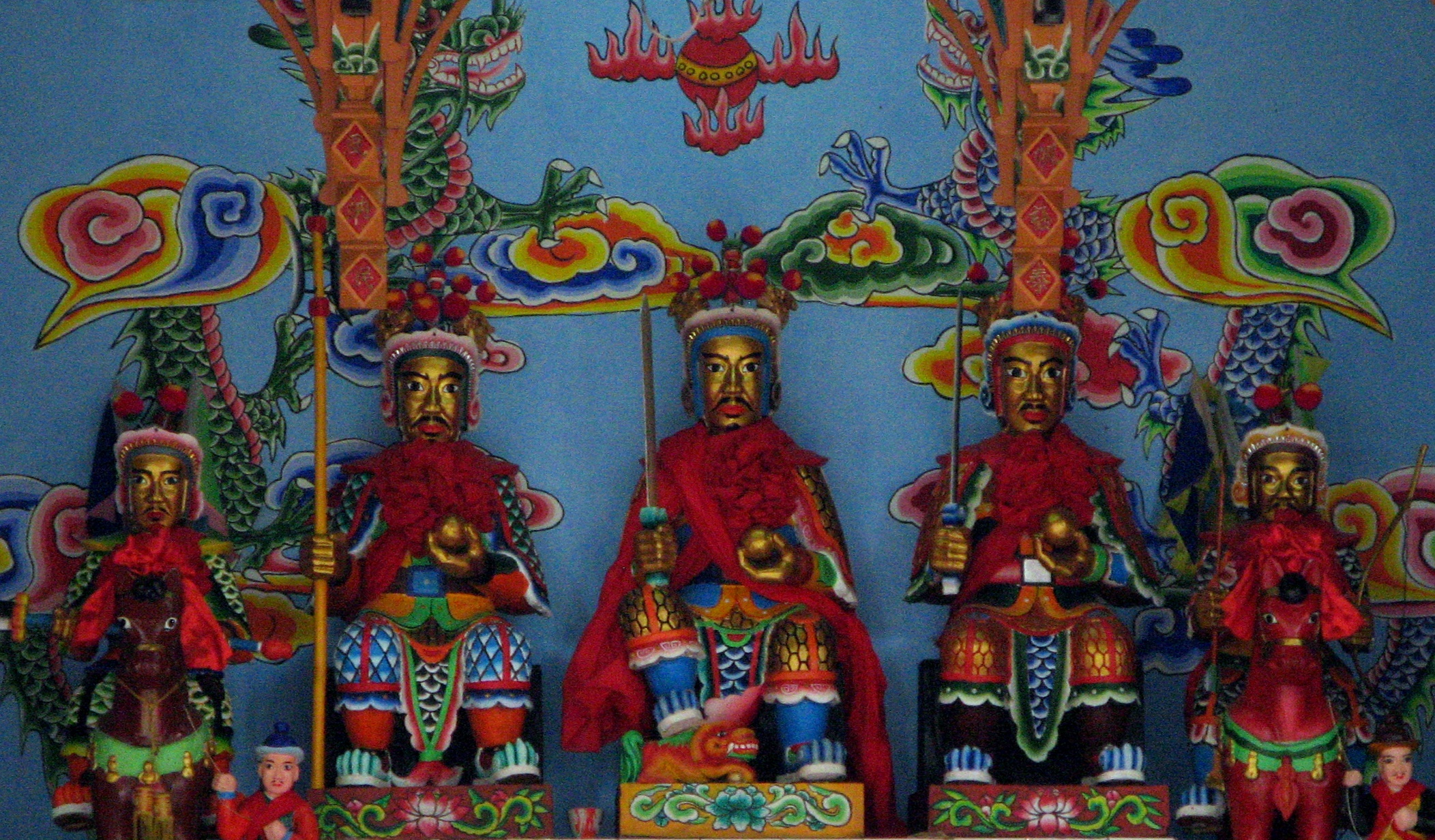
The pan-Chinese Sanxing (Three Star Gods) represented in Bai iconographic style at a Benzhu temple on Jinsuo Island, in Dali, Yunnan

Chinese religion has both influenced, and in turn has been influenced by, indigenous religions of ethnic groups that the Han Chinese have encountered along their ethnogenetic history. Seiwert (1987) finds evidence of pre-Chinese religions in the folk religion of certain southeastern provinces such as Fujian and Taiwan, especially in the local wu and lineages of ordained ritual masters.

A process of sinicization, or more appropriately a "Taoisation", is also the more recent experience of the indigenous religions of some distinct ethnic minorities of China, especially southwestern people. Chinese Taoists gradually penetrate within the indigenous religions of such peoples, in some cases working side by side with indigenous priests, in other cases taking over the latter's function and integrating them by requiring their ordination as Taoists. Usually, indigenous ritual practices remain unaffected and are adopted into Taoist liturgy, while indigenous gods are identified with Chinese gods. Seiwert discusses this phenomenon of "merger into Chinese folk religion" not as a mere elimination of non-Chinese indigenous religions, but rather as a cultural re-orientation. Local priests of southwestern ethnic minorities often acquire prestige by identifying themselves as Taoists and adopting Taoist holy texts.

Mou (2012) writes that "Taoism has formed an indissoluble bond" with indigenous religions of southwestern ethnic minorities, especially the Tujia, Yi and Yao. Seiwert mentions the Miao of Hunan. "Daogongism" is Taoism among the Zhuang, directed by the dàogōng (道公; "lords of the Tao") and it forms an established important aspect of the broader Zhuang folk religion.

On the other hand, it is also true that in more recent years there has been a general revival of indigenous lineages of ritual masters without identification of these as Taoists and support from the state Chinese Taoist Church. An example is the revival of lineages of bimo ("scripture sages") priests among the Yi peoples. Bimoism has a tradition of theological literature and though clergy ordination, and this is among the reasons why it is taken in high consideration by the Chinese government. Bamo Ayi (2001) attests that "since the early 1980s ... minority policy turned away from promoting assimilation of Han ways".

== Features ==
"Chief Star pointing the Dipper" 魁星點斗; Kuíxīng diǎn Dòu
- Kuixing ("Chief Star"), the god of exams, composed of the characters describing the four Confucian virtues (四德; Sìdé), standing on the head of the áo (鰲) turtle (an expression for coming first in the examinations), and pointing at the Big Dipper (斗)" (Note: The image is a good synthesis of the basic virtues of Chinese religion and Confucian ethics, that is to say "to move and act according to the harmony of Heaven". The Big Dipper or Great Chariot in Chinese culture (as in other traditional cultures) is a symbol of the axis mundi, the source of the universe (God, Tian) in its way of manifestation, order of creation (li or Tao). The symbol, also called the Gate of Heaven (天門; Tiānmén), is widely used in esoteric and mystical literature. For example, an excerpt from Shangqing Taoism's texts: "Life and death, separation and convergence, all derive from the seven stars. Thus when the Big Dipper impinges on someone, he dies, and when it moves, he lives. That is why the seven stars are Heaven's chancellor, the yamen where the gate is opened to give life.")

=== Theory of hierarchy and divinity ===
Chinese religions are polytheistic, meaning that many deities are worshipped as part of what has been defined as yǔzhòu shénlùn (宇宙神論), translated as "cosmotheism", a worldview in which divinity is inherent to the world itself. The gods (神; shen; "growth", "beings that give birth") are interwoven energies or principles that generate phenomena which reveal or reproduce the way of Heaven, that is to say the order (li) of the Greatnine(Tian).

Generally, Chinese folk religion accepts political and social status quo as a given, which is reflected in the hierarchical and bureaucratic model of its pantheon. Academic S.A. Smith observes, "Historically, folk religion served to legitimize hierarchies of gender and generation, although this was somewhat tempered by the goddesses who existed outside the bureaucratic pantheon."

In Chinese tradition, there is not a clear distinction between the gods and their physical body or bodies (from stars to trees and animals); the qualitative difference between the two seems not to have ever been emphasised. Rather, the disparity is said to be more quantitative than qualitative. In doctrinal terms, the Chinese view of gods is related to the understanding of qi, the life force, as the gods and their phenomenal productions are manifestations of it. In this way, all natural bodies are believed to be able to attain supernatural attributes by acting according to the universal oneness. Meanwhile, acting wickedly (that is to say against the Tian and its order) brings to disgrace and disaster.

In folk religions, gods (shen) and immortals (仙; xian) are not specifically distinguished from each other. Gods can incarnate in human form and human beings can reach immortality, which means to attain higher spirituality, since all the spiritual principles (gods) are begotten of the primordial qi before any physical manifestation.

In the Doctrine of the Mean, one of the Confucian four books, the zhenren (wise) is the man who has achieved a spiritual status developing his true sincere nature. This status, in turn, enables him to fully develop the true nature of others and of all things. The sage is able to "assist the transforming and nourishing process of Heaven and Earth", forming a trinity (三才; Sāncái; "Three Powers") with them. In other words, in the Chinese tradition humans are or can be the medium between Heaven and Earth, and have the role of completing what had been initiated.

Taoist schools in particular espouse an explicit spiritual pathway which pushes the earthly beings to the edge of eternity. Since the human body is a microcosm, enlivened by the universal order of yin and yang like the whole cosmos, the means of immortality can be found within oneself.

Among those worshipped as immortal heroes (xian, exalted beings) are historical individuals distinguished for their worth or bravery, those who taught crafts to others and formed societies establishing the order of Heaven, ancestors or progenitors (祖; zu), and the creators of a spiritual tradition. The concept of "human divinity" is not self-contradictory, as there is no unbridgeable gap between the two realms; rather, the divine and the human are mutually contained.

In comparison with gods of an environmental nature, who tend to remain stable throughout human experience and history, individual human deities change in time. Some endure for centuries, while others remain localised cults, or vanish after a short time. Immortal beings are conceived as "constellations of qi", which is so vibrant in certain historical individuals that, upon the person's death, this qi nexus does not dissipate but persists, and is reinforced by living people's worship. The energetic power of a god is thought to reverberate on the worshipers influencing their fortune.

==== Deities and immortals ====
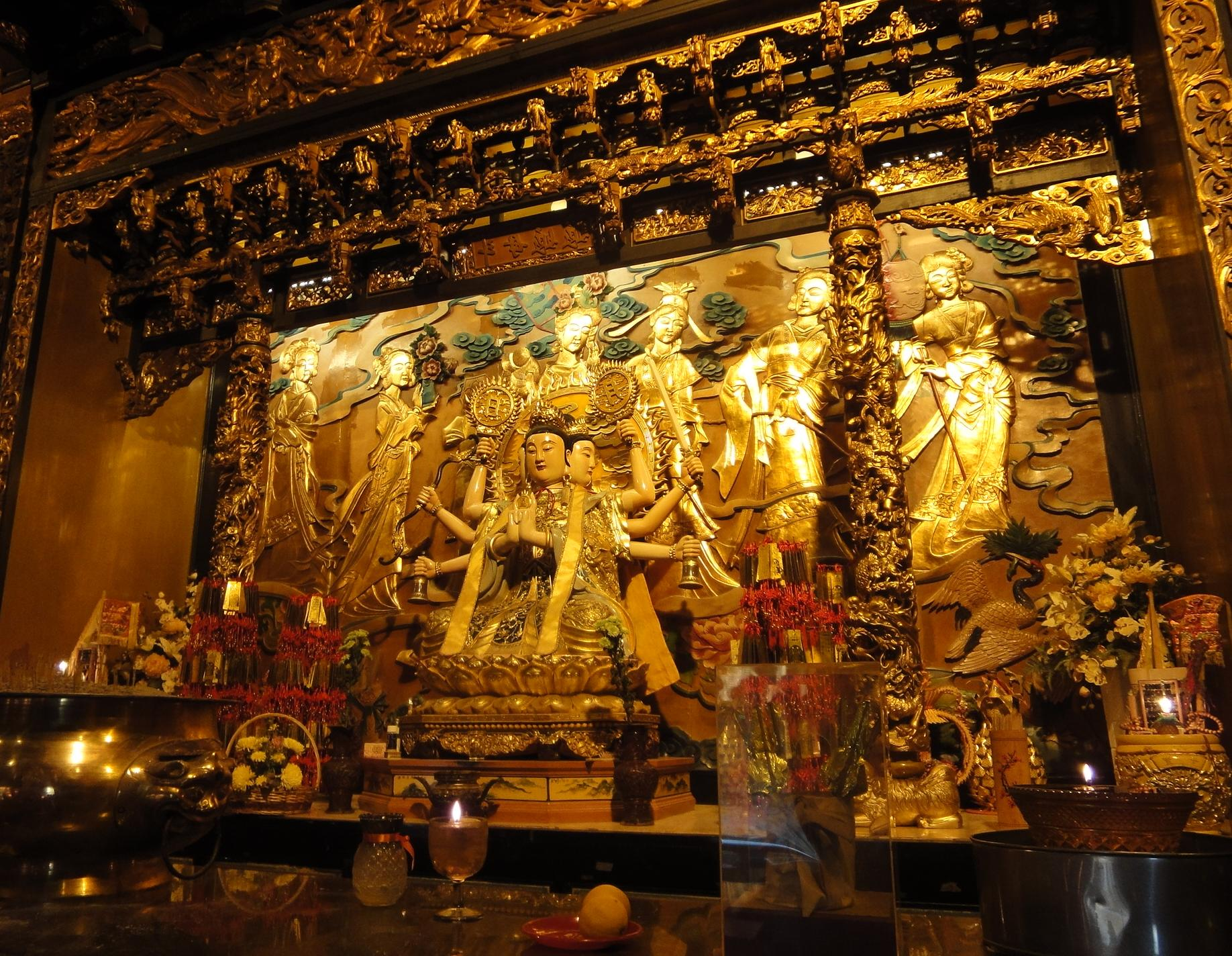
Main altar and statue of Doumu inside the Temple of Doumu in Butterworth, Penang, Malaysia

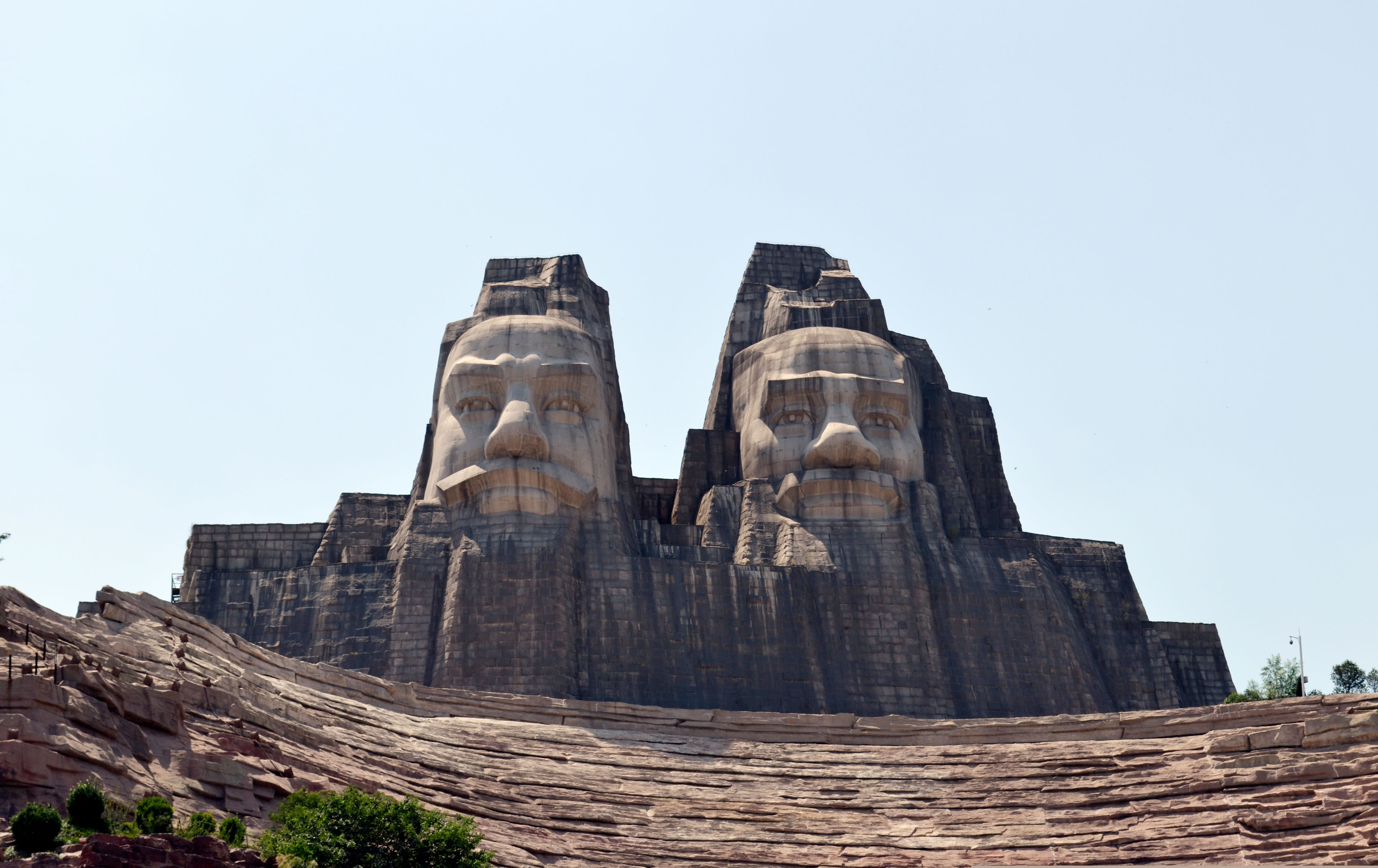
Statue and ceremonial complex of the Yellow and Red Gods, from whom the Han Chinese are said to be the descendants, in Zhengzhou, Henan

Gods and immortals (collectively 神仙; shénxiān) in the Chinese cultural tradition reflect a hierarchical, multiperspective experience of divinity. In Chinese language there is a terminological distinction between 神; shén, 帝; dì and 仙; xiān. Although the usage of the former two is sometimes blurred, it corresponds to the distinction in Western cultures between "god" and "deity", Latin genius (meaning a generative principle, "spirit") and deus or divus; dì, sometimes translated as "thearch", implies a manifested or incarnate "godly" power. (Note: The term "thearch" is from Greek theos ("deity"), with arche ("principle", "origin"), thus meaning "divine principle", "divine origin". In sinology it has been used to designate the incarnated gods who, according to Chinese tradition, sustain the world order and originated China. It is one of the alternating translations of 帝; dì, together with "emperor" and "god".) It is etymologically and figuratively analogous to the concept of di as the base of a fruit, which falls and produces other fruits. This analogy is attested in the Shuowen jiezi explaining "deity" as "what faces the base of a melon fruit".

Many classical books have lists and hierarchies of gods and immortals, among which the "Completed Record of Deities and Immortals" (神仙通鑒; Shénxiān tōngjiàn) of the Ming dynasty, and the "Biographies of Deities and Immortals" (神仙傳; Shénxiān zhuán) by Ge Hong (284–343). There's also the older Liexian zhuan (列仙傳; "Collected Biographies of Immortals").

There are the great cosmic gods representing the first principle in its unmanifested state or its creative order—Yudi (玉帝 "Jade Deity") and Doumu (斗母 "Mother of the Meaning" or "Great Chariot"), Pangu (盤古, the macranthropic metaphor of the cosmos), Xiwangmu (西王母 "Queen Mother of the West") and Dongwanggong (東王公 "King Duke of the East") who personify respectively the yin and the yang, as well as the dimensional Three Patrons and the Five Deities; then there are the sky and weather gods, the scenery gods, the vegetal and animal gods, and gods of human virtues and crafts. These are interpreted in different ways in Taoism and folk sects, the former conferring them long kataphatic names. Below the great deities, there is the unquantifiable number of gods of nature, as every phenomena have or are gods.

The Three Patrons (三皇; Sānhuáng)—Fuxi, Nüwa and Shennong—are the vertical embodiment of the primordial deity, each corresponding to one of the Three Realms (三界; Sānjiè). They symbolize yin, yang, and the human realm that mediates between them.

The Five Deities (五帝; Wǔdì) or "Five Forms of the Highest Deity" (五方上帝; Wǔfāng Shàngdì)—the Yellow, Green or Blue, Black, Red and White Deities—are the five "horizontal" manifestations of the primordial God and according with the Three Realms they have a celestial, a terrestrial and a chthonic form. (Note: The natural order emanating from the primordial God (Tian-Shangdi) inscribing and designing worlds as 壇; tán, "altar", the Chinese concept equivalent of the Indian mandala. The traditional Chinese religious cosmology shows Huangdi, embodiment of Shangdi, as the hub of the universe and the Wudi (four gods of the directions and the seasons) as his emanations. The diagram illustrated above is based on the Huainanzi.) They correspond to the five phases of creation, the five constellations rotating around the celestial pole, the five sacred mountains and the five directions of space (the four cardinal directions and the centre), and the five Dragon Gods (龍神; Lóngshén) which represent their mounts, that is to say the chthonic forces they preside over.

The Yellow God (黃神; Huángshén) or "Yellow God of the Northern Dipper" (黃神北斗; Huángshén Běidǒu (Note: A 斗; dǒu in Chinese is an entire semantic field meaning the shape of a "dipper", as the Big Dipper (北斗; Běidǒu), or a "cup", signifying a "whirl", and also has martial connotations meaning "fight", "struggle", "battle".)) is of peculiar importance, as he is a form of the universal God (Tian or Shangdi) symbolising the axis mundi (Kunlun), or the intersection between the Three Patrons and the Five Deities, that is the center of the cosmos. He is therefore described in the Shizi as the "Yellow Emperor with Four Faces" (黃帝四面; Huángdì Sìmiàn). His human incarnation, the "Yellow Emperor (or Deity) of the Mysterious Origin" (軒轅黃帝; Xuānyuán Huángdì), is said to be the creator of the Huaxia civility, of marriage and morality, language and lineage, and patriarch of all the Chinese together with the Red Deity. Xuanyuan was the fruit of virginal birth, as his mother Fubao conceived him as she was aroused, while walking in the country, by a lightning from the Big Dipper.

The Wutong gods of wealth are widely worshipped in south China. In north China, the fox spirit is widely worshipped. Mazu is widespread in the east.

==== Mother goddess worship ====
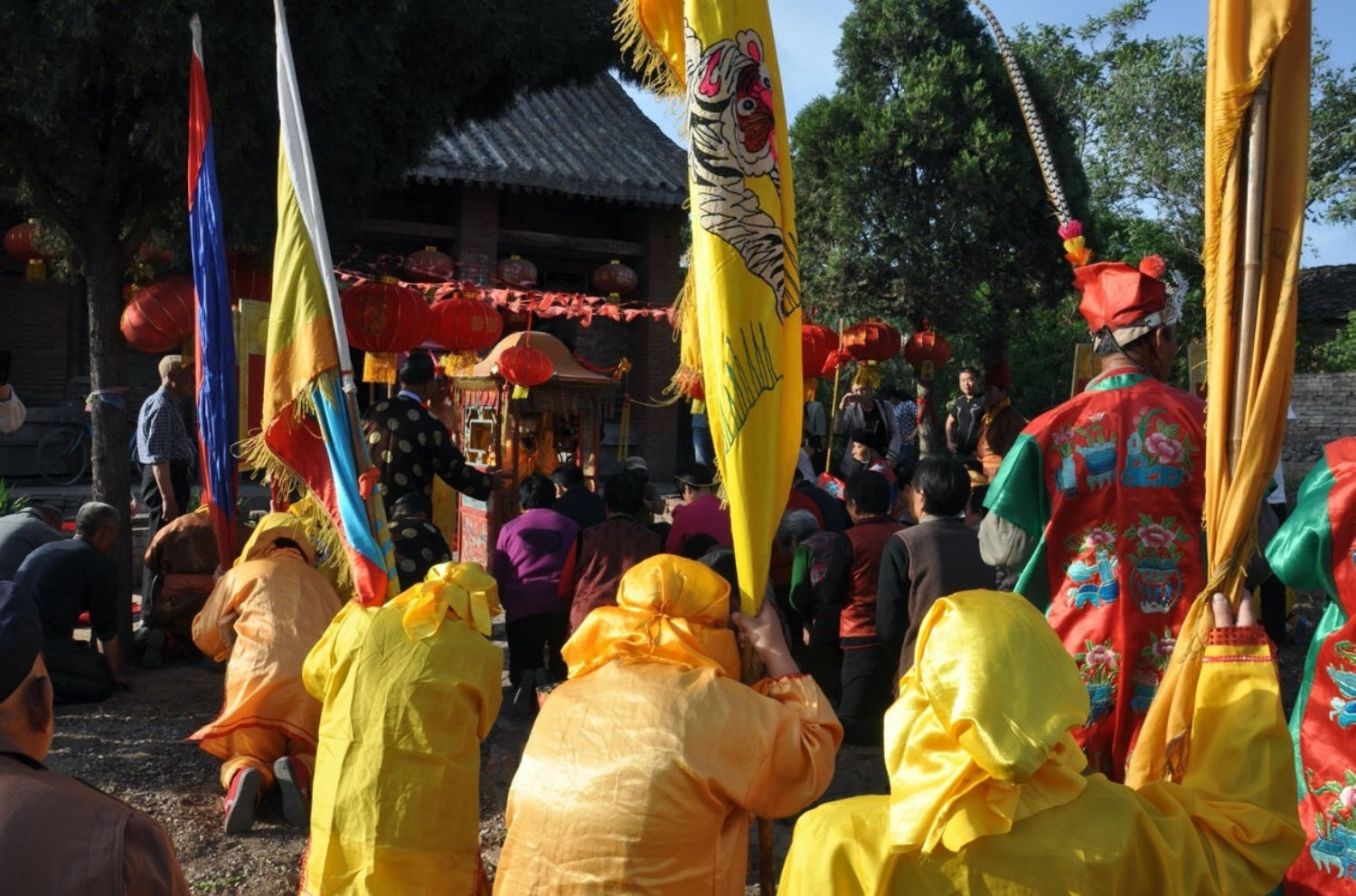
Villagers and ritual participants kneel down to wait for Jade Emperor to be carried out of his temple during a sacrifice of Bixia Yuanjun in Changzhi, Shanxi

The worship of mother goddesses for the cultivation of offspring is present all over China, but predominantly in northern provinces. There are nine main goddesses, and all of them tend to be considered as manifestations or attendant forces of a singular goddess identified variously as Bixia (碧霞 "Blue Dawn"), the daughter or female consort of the Green God of Mount Tai, or Houtu (后土 the "Queen of the Earth"). Bixia herself is identified by Taoists as the more ancient goddess Xiwangmu, Goddesses are commonly entitled mǔ (母; "mother"), lǎomǔ (老母; "old mother"), shèngmǔ (聖母; "holy mother"), niángniáng (娘娘; "lady"), nǎinai (奶奶; "granny").

Altars of goddess worship are usually arranged with Bixia at the center and two goddesses at her sides, most frequently the Lady of Eyesight and the Lady of Offspring. A different figure but with the same astral connections as Bixia is the Qixing Niangniang (七星娘娘; "Goddess of the Seven Stars"). There is also the cluster of the Holy Mothers of the Three Skies (三霄聖母; Sanxiao Shengmu; or "Ladies of the Three Skies", 三霄娘娘; Sanxiao Niangniang), composed of Yunxiao Guniang, Qiongxiao Guniang and Bixiao Guniang. In southeastern provinces the cult of Chen Jinggu (陳靖姑) is identified by some scholars as an emanation of the northern cult of Bixia.

There are other local goddesses with motherly features, including the northern Canmu (蠶母 "Silkworm Mother") and Mazu (媽祖 "Ancestral Mother"), popular in provinces along the eastern coast and in Taiwan. The title of "Queen of Heaven" (天后; Tiānhòu) is most frequently attributed to Mazu and Doumu (the cosmic goddess).

=== Worship and modalities of religious practice ===
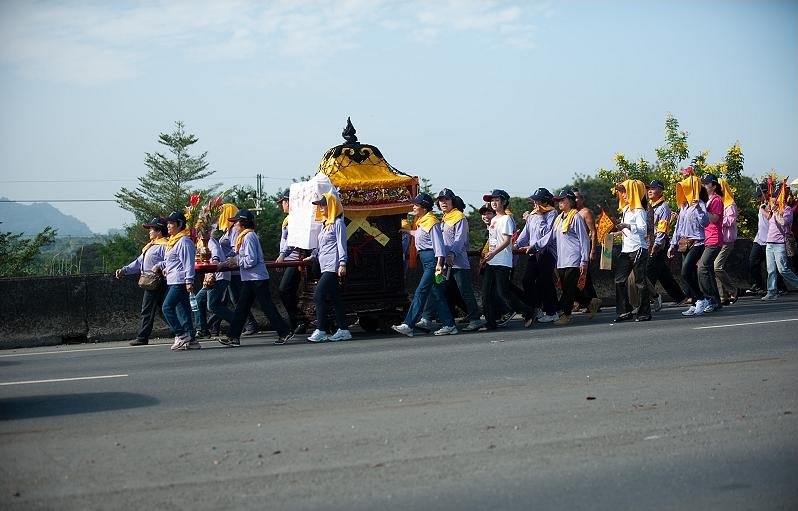
Procession with a traveling image of a god (行神; xíngshén) in central Taiwan

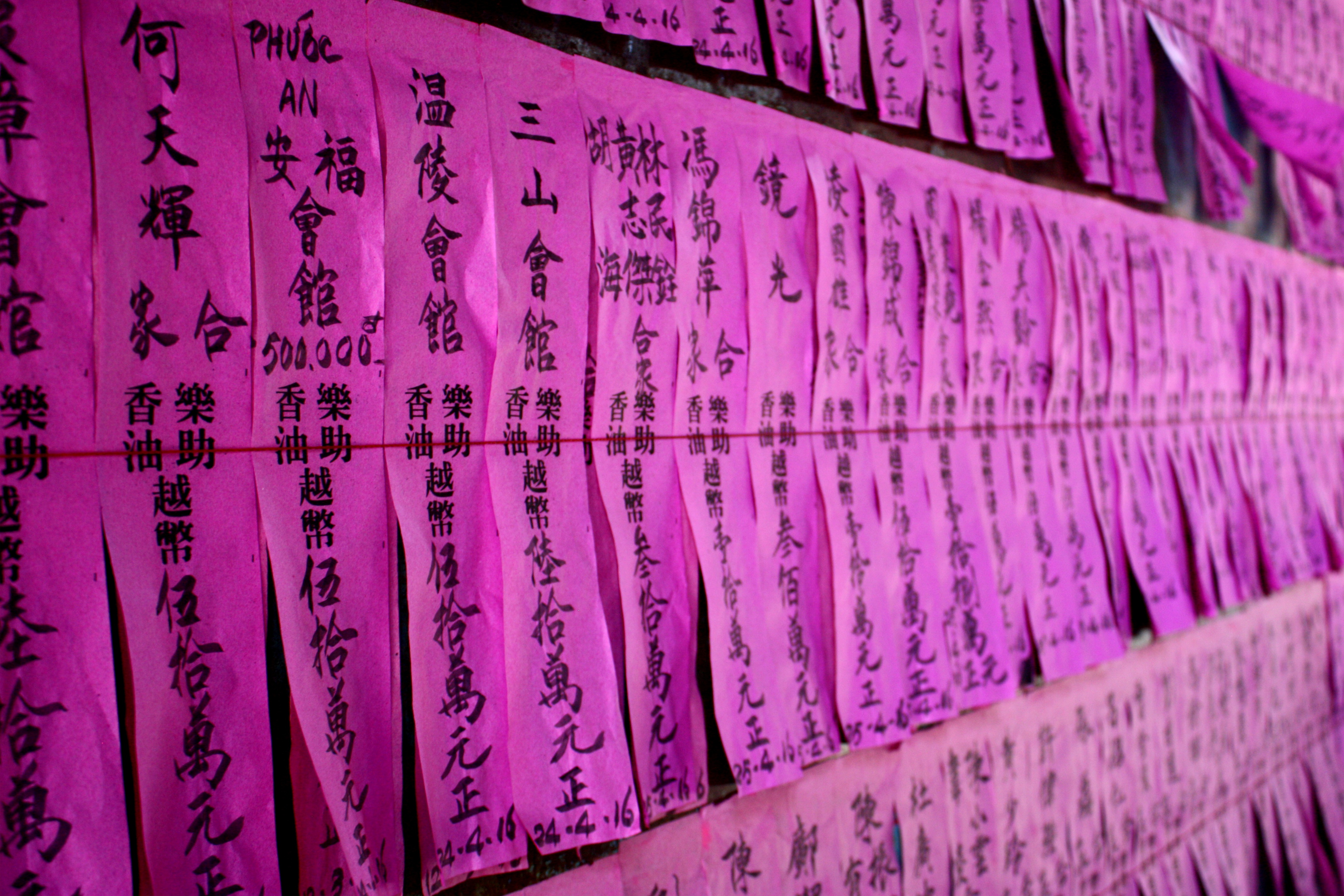
Vows to a deity at a Chinese temple in Vietnam

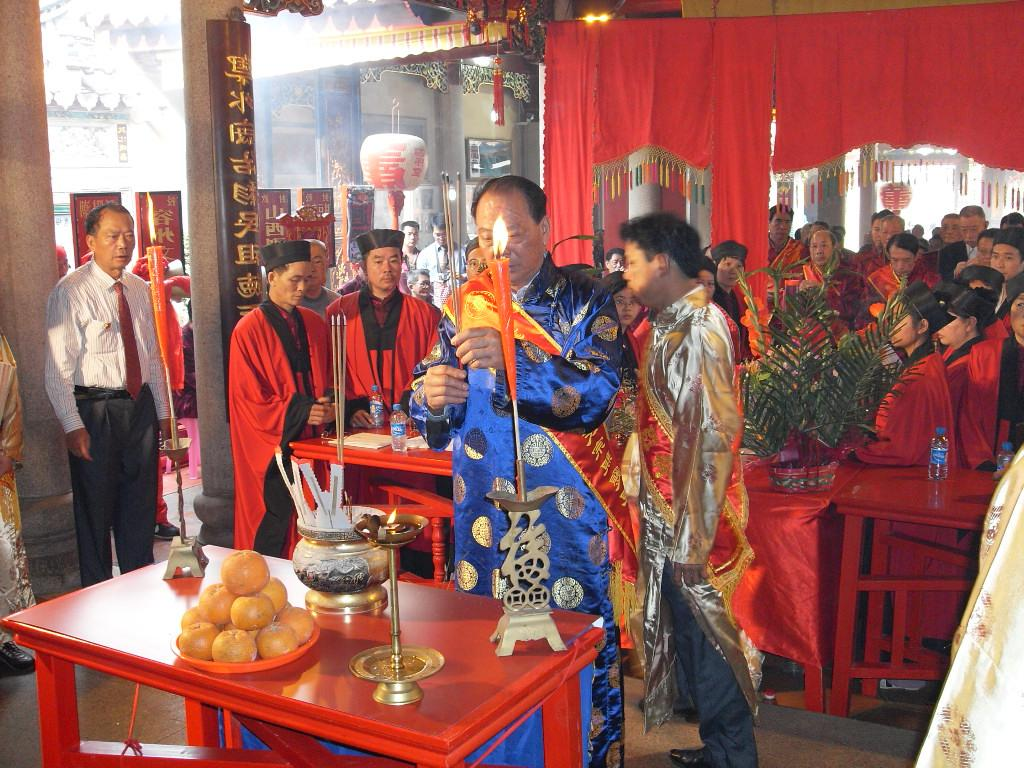
A Taoist rite for ancestor worship at the Xiao ancestral temple of Chaoyang, Shantou, Guangdong

Beliefs and practices within Chinese folk religion include ancestor worship, exorcism, funerary rites, geomancy, divination, household god worship, spirit mediums, and vestiges of animism. Significant local variations exist, especially with regard to the gods worshipped.

Adam Yuet Chau identifies five styles or modalities of "doing" Chinese religion:

- Discursive-scriptural: involving the composition, preaching, and recitation of texts (classics, Taoist scriptures and morality books);
- Personal cultivation mode, involving a long-term cultivation and transformation of oneself with the goal of becoming a 仙; xian (immortal), 真人; zhenren ("true person"), or shengren (wise), through the practice of different "technologies of the self" (氣功; qigong, Taoist inner and outer alchemy, charitable acts for merit, memorisation and recitation of texts);
- Liturgical: involving elaborate ritual procedures conducted by specialists of rites (Taoist rites, Confucian rites, Nuo rites, 風水; fengshui);
- Immediate practical: aiming at quick efficacious (靈; ling) results through simple ritual and magical techniques (divination, talismans, divine medicine, consulting media and shamans);
- Relational: emphasising the devotional relationship between men and deities and among men themselves (organising elaborate sacrifices, making vows, organising temple festivals, pilgrimages, processions, and religious communities) in "social comings and goings" (來往; laiwang) and "interconnectedness" (關係; guanxi).

Generally speaking, the Chinese believe that spiritual and material well-being ensues from the harmony of humanity and gods in their participation in the same cosmic power, and also believe that by taking the right path and practice anybody is able to reach the absolute reality. Religious practice is therefore regarded as the bridge to link the human world to the spiritual source, maintaining the harmony of the micro and macrocosmos, protecting the individual and the world from disruption. In this sense, the Chinese view of human life is not deterministic, but one is a master of his own life and can choose to collaborate with the deities for a harmonious world. Chinese culture being a holistic system, in which every aspect is a part of a whole, Chinese folk religious practice is often intermingled with political, educational and economic concerns. A gathering or event may be encompassed with all of these aspects; in general, the commitment (belief) and the process or rite (practice) together form the internal and external dimensions of Chinese religious life. In village communities, religious services are often organised and led by local people themselves. Leaders are usually selected among male heads of families or lineages, or village heads.

A simple form of individual practice is to show respect for the gods (敬神; jing shen) through jingxiang (incense offering), and the exchange of vows (還願; huan yuan). Sacrifice can consist of incense, oil, and candles, as well as money. Religious devotion may also express in the form of performance troupes (huahui), involving many types of professionals such as stilt walkers, lion dancers, musicians, martial arts masters, yangge dancers, and story-tellers.

Deities can also be respected through moral deeds in their name (善事; shanshi), and self-cultivation (修行; xiuxing). Some forms of folk religion develop clear prescriptions for believers, such as detailed lists of meritorious and sinful deeds in the form of "morality books" (善書; shanshu) and ledgers of merit and demerit. Involvement in the affairs of communal or intra-village temples are perceived by believers as ways for accumulating merit (功德; gongde). Virtue is believed to accumulate in one's heart, which is seen as energetic centre of the human body (在君心作福田; zai jun xin zuo tian fu). Practices of communication with the gods comprehend different forms of Chinese shamanism, such as wu shamanism and tongji mediumship, or fuji practice.

Folk religious practice involves various professional or semi-professional ritual specialists who could be hired by individuals or communities. These include spirit mediums, fortune tellers, feng shui practitioners, yin-yang specialists, ritual musicians, and crafters of votive paper offerings.

==== Sacrifices ====
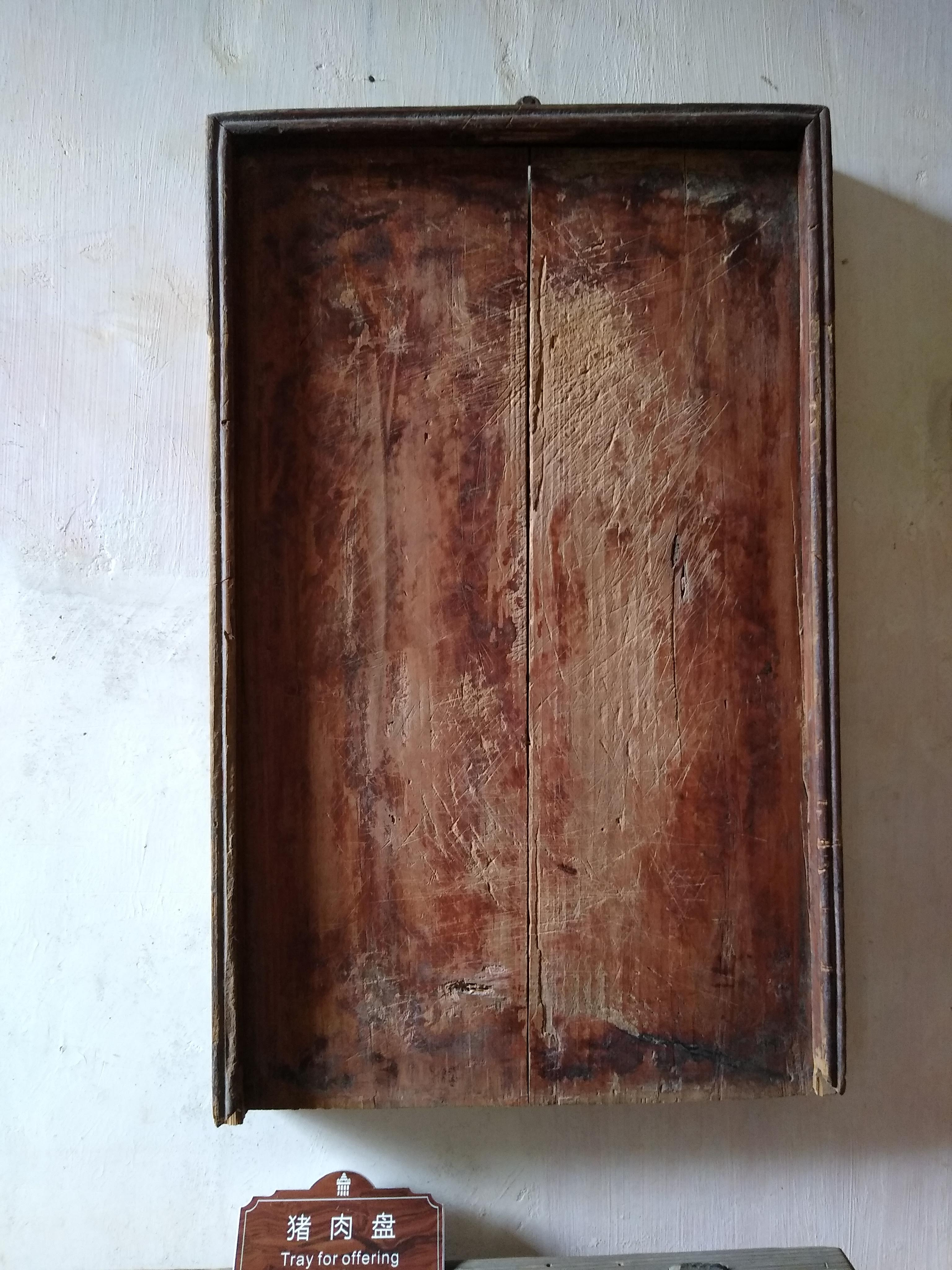
Tray for offering sacrifices, on display in Kaiping

Classical Chinese has characters for different types of sacrifice, probably the oldest way to communicate with divine forces, today generally encompassed by the definition jìsì (祭祀). However different in scale and quantity, all types of sacrifice would normally involve food, wine, meat and later incense.

Sacrifices usually differ according to the kind of deity they are devoted to. Traditionally, cosmic and nature gods are offered uncooked (or whole) food, while ancestors are offered cooked food. Moreover, sacrifices for gods are made inside the temples that enshrine them, while sacrifices for ancestors are made outside temples. Yearly sacrifices (ji) are made to Confucius, the Red and Yellow Emperors, and other cultural heroes and ancestors.

Sacrifices to ancestors take place in front of the ancestral tablet, which is viewed as representing the ancestor or containing the ancestor's soul.

Both in past history and at the present, all sacrifices are assigned with both religious and political purposes. Some gods are considered carnivorous, for example the River God (河神; Héshén) and Dragon Gods, and offering to them requires animal sacrifice.

==== Thanksgiving and redeeming ====
The aims of rituals and sacrifices may be of thanksgiving and redeeming, usually involving both. Various sacrifices are intended to express gratitude toward the gods in the hope that spiritual blessing and protection will continue. The jiào (醮), an elaborate Taoist sacrifice or "rite of universal salvation", is intended to be a cosmic community renewal, that is to say a reconciliation of a community around its spiritual centre. The jiao ritual usually starts with zhai, "fasting and purification", that is meant as an atonement for evil-doing, then followed by sacrificial offerings.

This rite, of great political importance, can be intended for the whole nation. In fact, as early as the Song dynasty, emperors asked renowned Taoists to perform such rituals on their behalf or for the entire nation. The modern Chinese republic has given approval for Taoists to conduct such rituals since the 1990s, with the aim of protecting the country and the nation.

==== Rites of passage ====
A variety of practices are concerned with personal well-being and spiritual growth. Rites of passage are intended to narrate the holy significance of each crucial change throughout a life course. These changes, which are physical and social and at the same time spiritual, are marked by elaborate customs and religious rituals.

In the holistic view about nature and the human body and life, as macro and microcosmos, the life process of a human being is equated with the rhythm of seasons and cosmic changes. Hence, birth is likened to spring, youth to summer, maturity to autumn and old age to winter. There are ritual passages for those who belong to a religious order of priests or monks, and there are the rituals of the stages in a life, the main four being birth, adulthood, marriage and death.

Chinese folk religion sometimes incorporated Daoist elements about personal growth. A Tao realm inconceivable and incomprehensible by normal humans and even Confucius and Confucianists was sometimes called "the Heavens" and thought to exist by many ancient folk religion practitioners. Higher, spiritual versions of Daoists such as Laozi were thought to exist in there when they were alive and absorb "the purest Yin and Yang", as well as xian who were reborn into it after their human selves' spirits were sent there. These spiritual versions were thought to be abstract beings that can manifest in that world as mythical beings such as xian dragons who eat yin and yang energy and ride clouds and their qi.

=== Places of worship ===
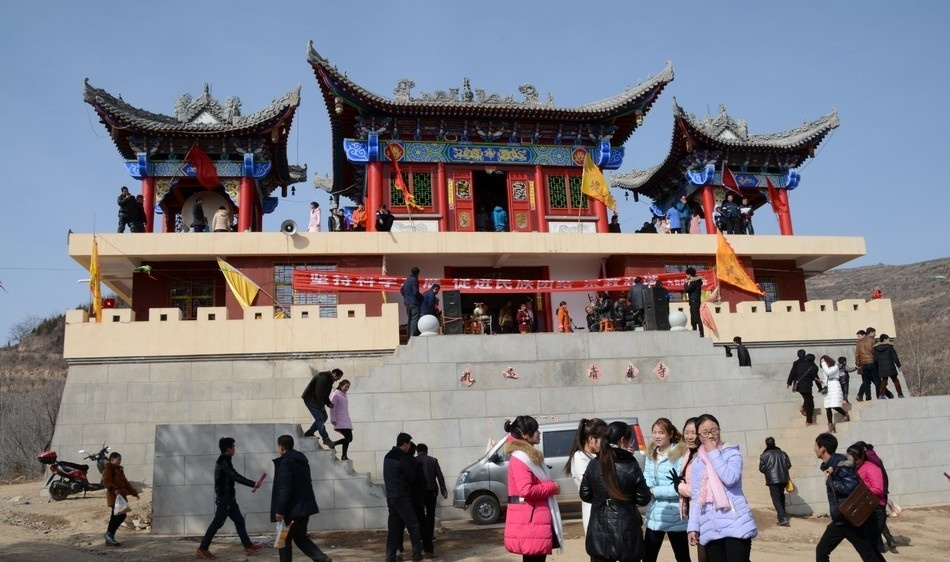
玉皇廟; Yùhuángmiào (Note: Temples of the Jade Deity, a representation of the universal God in popular religion, are usually built on raised artificial platforms.)

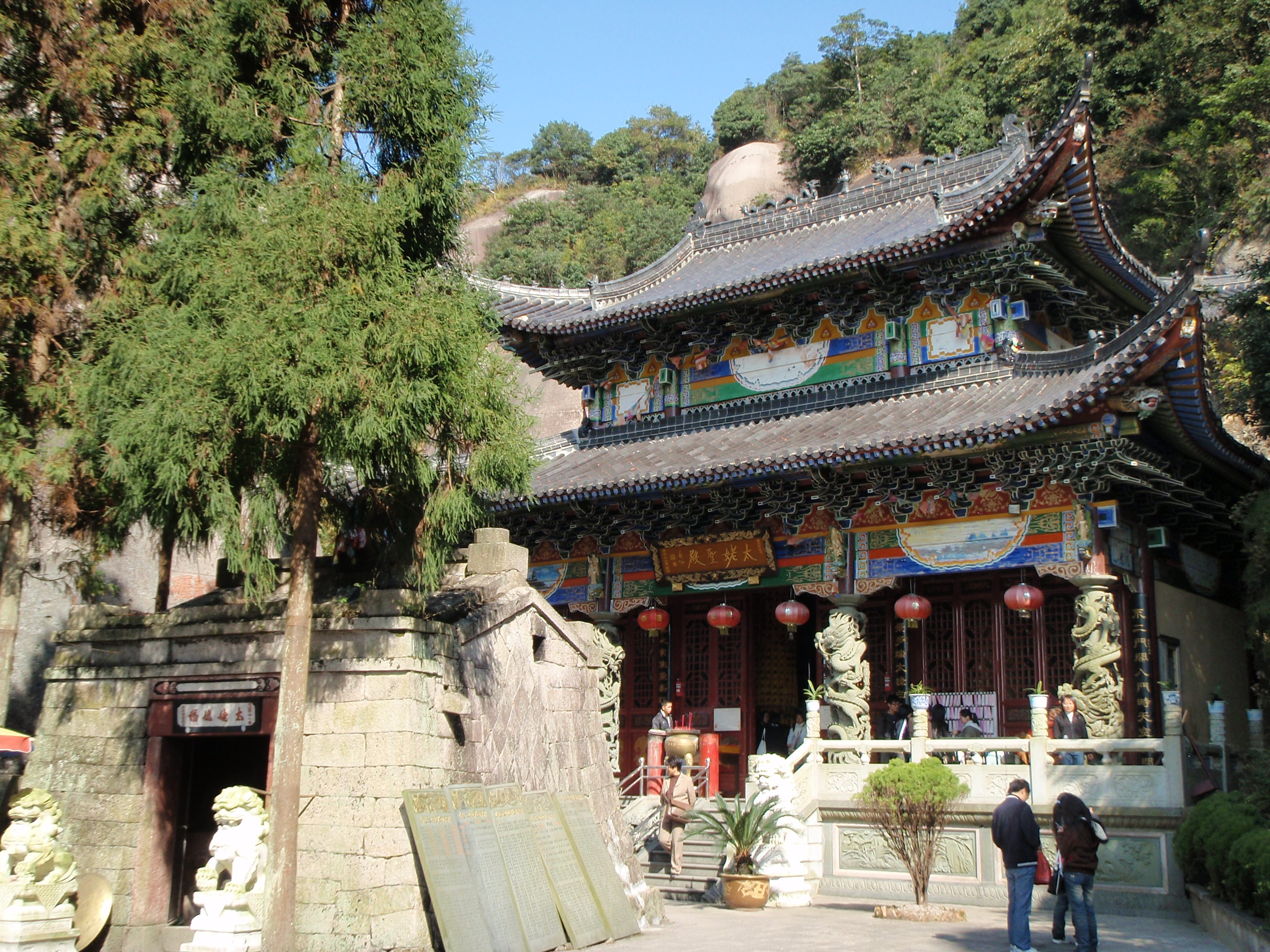
太母聖殿; Tàimǔ shèngdiàn

Examples of temples from two different parts of China: the Temple of the Jade King in Qingshui, Tianshui, Gansu; and the Holy Temple of the Highest Mother in Fuding, Ningde, Fujian

Chinese language has a variety of words defining the temples of the Chinese religion. Some of these terms have a precise functional use, although with time some confusion has arisen and some of them have been used interchangeably in some contexts. Collective names defining "temples" or places of worship are 寺廟; sìmiào and 廟宇; miàoyǔ.

However, 寺; sì, which originally meant a type of residence for imperial officials, with the introduction of Buddhism in China became associated with Buddhist monasteries as many officials donated their residences to the monks. Today sì and sìyuàn (寺院; "monastery") are used almost exclusively for Buddhist monasteries, with sporadic exceptions, and sì is a component character of names for Chinese mosques. Another term now mostly associated with Buddhism is 庵; ān, "thatched hut", originally a form of dwelling of monks later extended to mean monasteries.

Temples can be public, private (私廟; sìmiào) and household temples (家廟; jiāmiào). The 境; jing is a broader "territory of a god", a geographic region or a village or city with its surroundings, marked by multiple temples or complexes of temples and delineated by the processions.

Pertaining to Chinese religion the most common term is 廟; miào graphically meaning a "shrine" or "sacred enclosure"; it is the general Chinese term that is translated with the general Western "temple", and is used for temples of any of the deities of polytheism. Other terms include 殿; diàn which indicates the "house" of a god, enshrining one specific god, usually a chapel within a larger temple or sacred enclosure; and 壇; tán which means "altar" and refers to any indoor or outdoor altars, majestic outdoor altars being those for the worship of Heaven and Earth and other gods of the environment. 宮; Gōng, originally referring to imperial palaces, became associated to temples of representations of the universal God or the highest gods and consorts, such as the Queen of Heaven.

Another group of words is used for the temples of ancestral religion: 祠; cí (either "temple" or "shrine", meaning a sacred enclosure) or 宗祠; zōngcí ("ancestor shrine"). These terms are also used for temples dedicated to immortal beings. 祖廟; Zǔmiào ("original temple") instead refers to a temple which is believed to be the original temple of a deity, the most legitimate and powerful.

堂; Táng, meaning "hall" or "church hall", originally referred to the central hall of secular buildings but it entered religious usage as a place of worship of the folk religious sects. Christianity in China has borrowed this term from the sects.

觀; Guàn is the appropriate Chinese translation of the Western term "temple", as both refer to "contemplation" (of the divine, according to the astral patterns in the sky or the icon of a deity). Together with its extension 道觀; dàoguàn ("to contemplate or observe the Dao"), it is used exclusively for Taoist temples and monasteries of the state Taoist Church.

Generic terms include 院; yuàn meaning "sanctuary", from the secular usage for a courtyard, college or hospital institution; 岩; yán ("rock") and 洞; dòng ("hole", "cave") referring to temples set up in caves or on cliffs. Other generic terms are 府; fǔ ("house"), originally of imperial officials, which is a rarely used term; and 亭; tíng ("pavilion") which refers to the areas of a temple where laypeople can stay. There is also 神祠; shéncí, "shrine of a god".

Ancestral shrines are sacred places in which lineages of related families, identified by shared surnames, worship their common progenitors. These temples are the "collective representation" of a group, and function as centers where religious, social and economic activities intersect.

Chinese temples are traditionally built according to the styles and materials (wood and bricks) of Chinese architecture, and this continues to be the rule for most of the new temples. However, in the early 20th century and especially in the mainland religious revival of the early 21st century, there has been a proliferation of new styles in temple construction. These include the use of new materials (stones and concrete, stainless steel and glass) and the combination of Chinese traditional shapes with styles of the West or of transnational modernity. Examples can be found in the large ceremonial complexes of mainland China.

==== Temple networks and gatherings ====
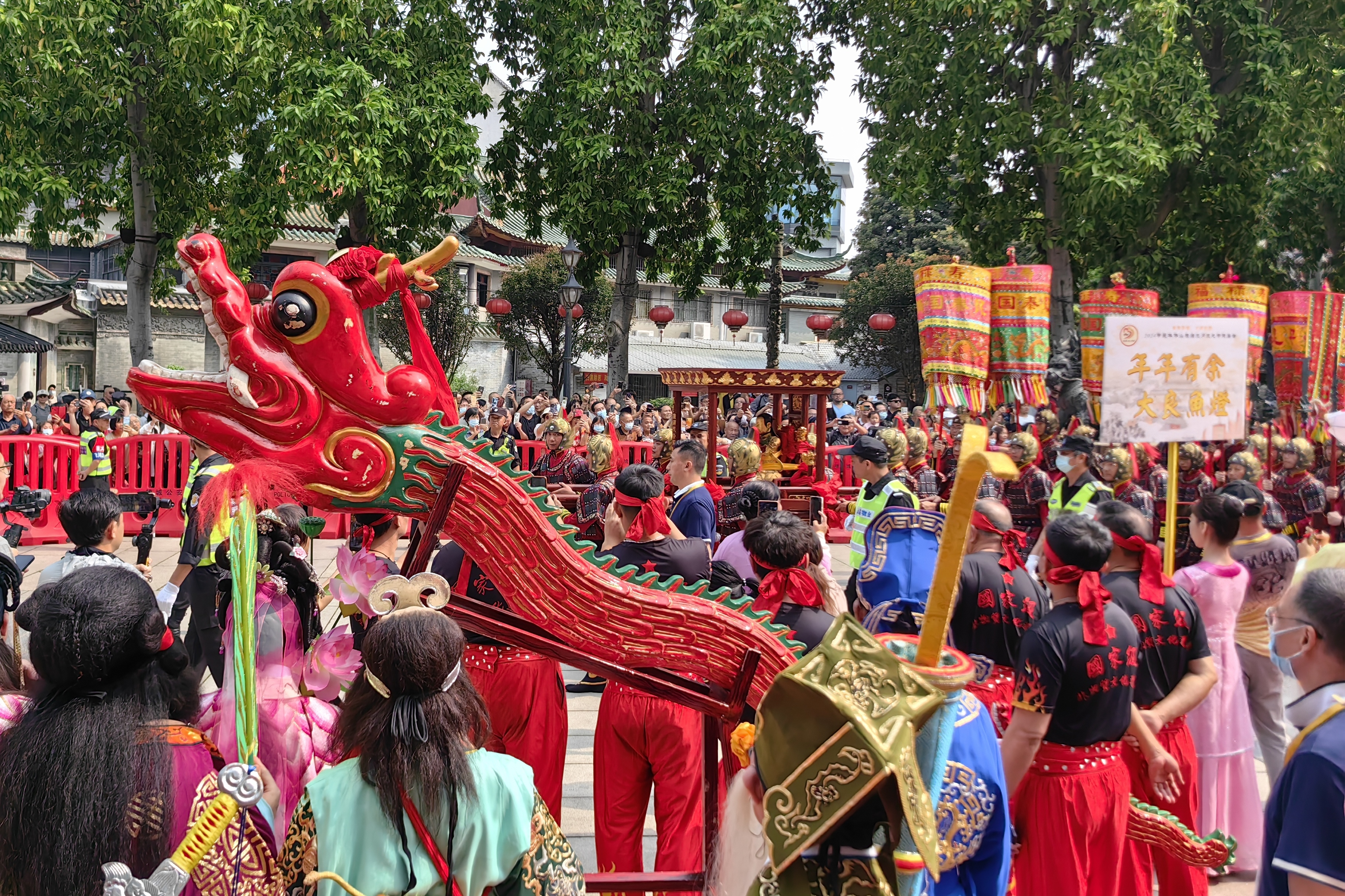
Gathering at Foshan Ancestral Temple, Guangdong

分香; Fēnxiāng, meaning an "incense division", is a term that defines both hierarchical networks of temples dedicated to a god, and the ritual process by which these networks form. These temple networks are economic and social bodies, and in certain moments of history have even taken military functions. They also represent routes of pilgrimage, with communities of devotees from the affiliated temples going up in the hierarchy to the senior temple (zumiao).

When a new temple dedicated to the same god is founded, it enters the network through the ritual of division of incense. This consists in filling the incense burner of the new temple with ashes brought from the incense burner of an existing temple. The new temple is therefore spiritually affiliated to the older temple where the ashes were taken, and directly below it in the hierarchy of temples.

廟會; Miàohuì, literally "gatherings at the temple", are "collective rituals to greet the gods" (迎神賽會; yíngshén sàihuì) that are held at the temples on various occasions such as the Chinese New Year or the birthday or holiday of the god enshrined in the temple. In North China they are also called sàihuì (賽會; "communal ritual gatherings") or xiānghuì ("incense gatherings"), while a sàishè (賽社; "communal ritual body") is the association which organises such events and by extension it has become another name of the event itself.

Activities include rituals, theatrical performances, processions of the gods' images throughout villages and cities, and offerings to the temples. In north China temple gatherings are generally week-long and large events attracting tens of thousands of people, while in south China they tend to be smaller and village-based events.

== Demographics ==
=== Mainland China and Taiwan ===
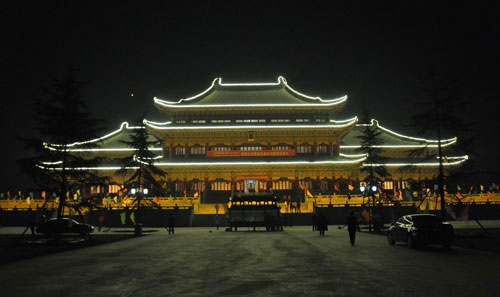
Temple of the Founding Father (師祖殿; Shīzǔdiàn) of the principal holy see (聖地; shèngdì) of the Plum Flower folk religious sect in Xingtai, Hebei

Publishing in 2026, academic S.A. Smith writes that there is relatively little data on the number of folk religion adherents in the People's Republic of China.

According to Yang & Hu (2012):

Chinese folk religion deserves serious research and better understanding in the social scientific study of religion. This is not only because of the sheer number of adherents—several times more adherents than Christians and Buddhists combined, but also because folk religion may have significant social and political functions in China's transition.

According to their research, 55.5% of the adult population (15+) of China, or 578 million people in absolute numbers, believe and practise folk religions, including a 20% who practice ancestor religion or communal worship of deities, and the rest who practise what Yang and Hu define "individual" folk religions like devotion to specific gods such as Caishen. Members of folk religious sects are not taken into account. Around the same year, Kenneth Dean estimates 680 million people involved in folk religion, or 51% of the total population. (Note: Scholar Kenneth Dean estimates 680 million people involved in folk temples and rituals. Quote: "According to Dean, 'in the rural sector... if one takes a rough figure of 1000 people per village living in 680,000 administrative villages and assume an average of two or three temples per village, one arrives at a figure of over 680 million villagers involved in some way with well over a million temples and their rituals'.") At the same time, self-identified folk religion believers in Taiwan are 42.7% of the adult (20+) population, or 16 million people in absolute numbers, although devotion to ancestors and gods can be found even among other religions' believers or 88% of the population. According to the 2005 census of Taiwan, Taoism is the statistical religion of 33% of the population.

The Chinese Spiritual Life Survey conducted by the Center on Religion and Chinese Society of Purdue University, published in 2010, found that 754 million people (56.2%) practise ancestor religion, but only 216 million people (16%) "believe in the existence" of the ancestor. (Note: However, there is considerable discrepancy between what Chinese and Western cultures intend with the concepts of "belief", "existence" and "practice". The Chinese folk religion is often considered one of "belonging" rather than "believing" (see: Fan & Chen (2013), p. 5)) The same survey says that 173 million (13%) practise Chinese folk religion in a Taoist framework.

The China Family Panel Studies' survey of 2012, published in 2014, based on the Chinese General Social Surveys which are held on robust samples of tens of thousands of people, found that only 12.6% of the population of China belongs to its five state-sanctioned religious groups, while among the rest of the population only 6.3% are atheists, and the remaining 81% (1 billion people) pray to or worship gods and ancestors in the manner of the traditional popular religion. The same survey has found that 2.2% (≈30 million) of the total population declares to be affiliated to one or another of the many folk religious sects. At the same time, reports of the Chinese government claim that the sects have about the same number of followers of the five state-sanctioned religions counted together (≈13% ≈180 million).

==== Economy of temples and rituals ====
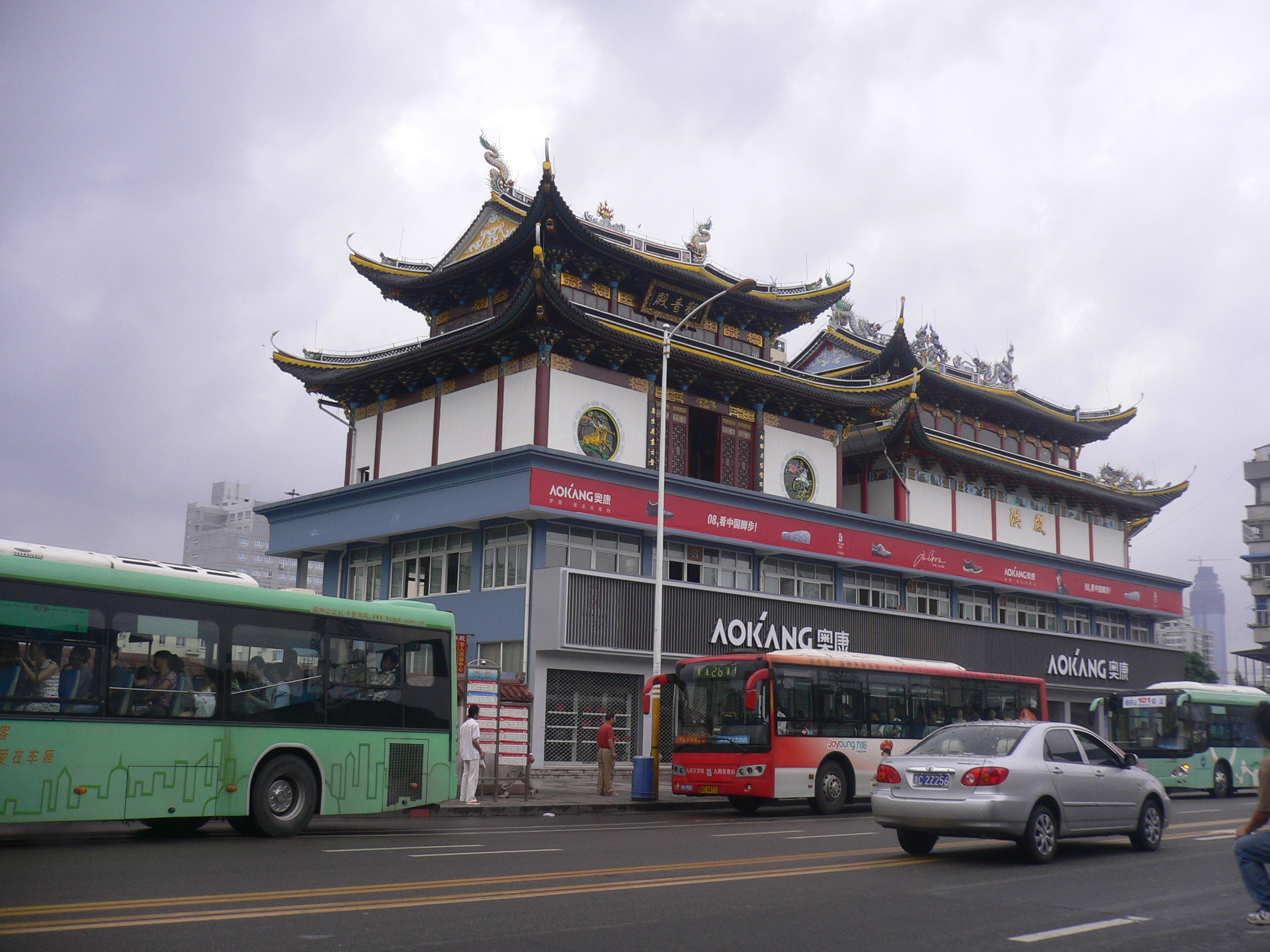
Folk temple on the rooftop of a commercial building in the city of Wenzhou

Scholars have studied the economic dimension of Chinese folk religion, whose rituals and temples interweave a form of grassroots socio-economic capital for the well-being of local communities, fostering the circulation of wealth and its investment in the "sacred capital" of temples, gods and ancestors.

This religious economy already played a role in periods of imperial China, plays a significant role in modern Taiwan, and is seen as a driving force in the rapid economic development in parts of rural China, especially the southern and eastern coasts.

According to Law (2005), in his study about the relationship between the revival of folk religion and the reconstruction of patriarchal civilisation:

Similar to the case in Taiwan, the practice of folk religion in rural southern China, particularly in the Pearl River Delta, has thrived as the economy has developed. ... In contrast to Weberian predictions, these phenomena suggest that drastic economic development in the Pearl River Delta may not lead to total disenchantment with beliefs concerning magic in the cosmos. On the contrary, the revival of folk religions in the Delta region is serving as a countervailing re-embedding force from the local cultural context, leading to the coexistence of the world of enchantments and the modern world.

Mayfair Yang (2007) defines it as an "embedded capitalism", which preserves local identity and autonomy, and an "ethical capitalism" in which the drive for individual accumulation of money is tempered by religious and kinship ethics of generosity which foster the sharing and investment of wealth in the construction of civil society.

=== Overseas Chinese ===
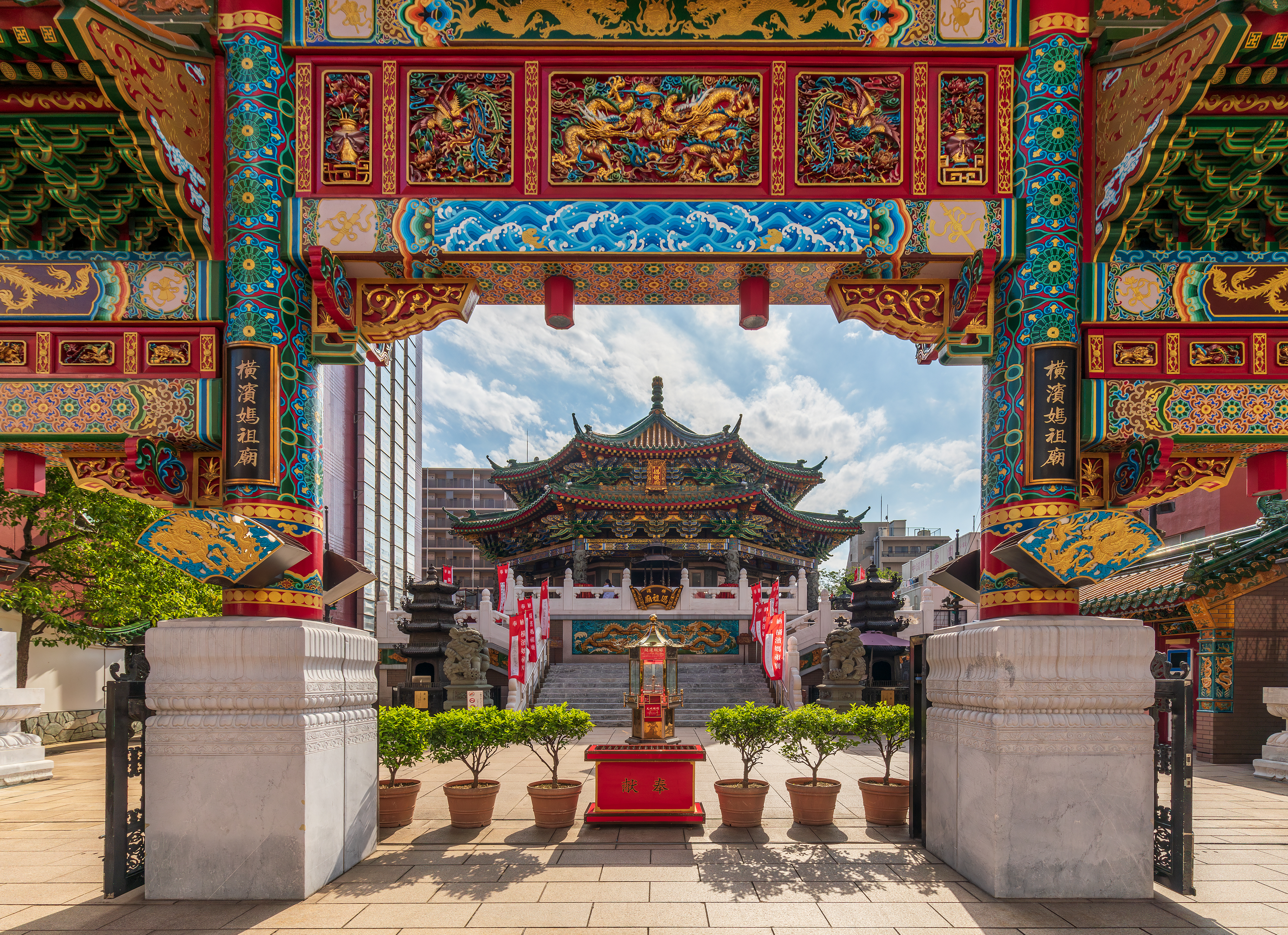
Temple of Mazu in Yokohama, serving the Chinese of Japan

Most of the overseas Chinese populations have maintained Chinese folk religions, often adapting to the new environment by developing new cults and incorporating elements of local traditions. In Southeast Asia, Chinese deities are subject to a "re-territorialisation" and maintain their relation to the ethnic associations (i.e. the Hainanese Association or the Fujianese Association, each of them has a patron deity and manages one or more temples of such a deity).

The most important deity among Southeast Asian Chinese is Mazu, the Queen of Heaven and goddess of the sea. This is related to the fact that most of these Chinese populations are from southeastern provinces of China, where the goddess is very popular. Some folk religious sects have spread successfully among Southeast Asian Chinese. They include especially Church of Virtue (De teaching), Zhenkongdao and Yiguandao.

== See also ==
- Chinese ancestral worship
- Chinese religions of fasting
  - Xiantiandao
- Shinto-Buddhism
- Korean shamanism
- Quanzhen School
- Tai folk religion

=== By place ===
- Four Great Mountains (Taiwan)
- Temples of Taichung in Taiwan
- Tin Hau temples in Hong Kong
- Kwan Tai temples in Hong Kong
- Hip Tin temples in Hong Kong
- Confucian Religion in Indonesia
- List of City God Temples in China
- Baishatun Mazu Pilgrimage
- Qing Shan King Sacrificial Ceremony
- Chinese temples in Kolkata
- Taiwanese chicken-beheading rituals

=== Other Sino-Tibetan ethnic religions ===
- Benzhuism
- Bimoism
- Bon
- Dongbaism
- Nuo folk religion
- Qiang folk religion

=== Other non-Sino-Tibetan ethnic religions present in China ===
- Manchu shamanism
- Mongolian shamanism
- Miao folk religion
- Tengrism
- Yao folk religion
- Zhuang folk religion

=== Other articles ===
- Religion in China
- Wang Ye worship
- Nine Emperor Gods Festival
- Birthday of the Monkey God & Monkey King Festival
- Dajiao
- Kau chim & Jiaobei
- Ancestral halls & Ancestral tablet
- Chinese lineage associations
- Hong Kong Government Lunar New Year kau chim tradition
- Religious goods store & Papier-mache offering shops in Hong Kong
- Bell Church & Bell Church (temple)
- Ethnic religion
- Tiān
