= 2015 in Taiwan =

- Decades: 1990s; 2000s; 2010s; 2020s
- See also: Other events of 2015; History of Taiwan • Timeline • Years

Events from the year 2015 in Taiwan, Republic of China. This year is numbered Minguo 104 according to the official Republic of China calendar.

== Incumbents ==
- President – Ma Ying-jeou
- Vice President – Wu Den-yih
- Premier – Mao Chi-kuo
- Vice Premier – Chang San-cheng

== Events ==
=== January ===
- 1 January
  - The Tuo Chiang-class corvette was put into work during military drill in southwestern coast of Taiwan.
  - The end of hunger strike of Annette Lu over the release of former President Chen Shui-bian.
  - The new Chimei Museum opened in Tainan.
  - Mainland Chinese tourists can apply for Exit and Entry Permit upon arrival for visits to Kinmen, Penghu and Lienchiang Counties.
  - The maximum amount of cash that a traveler can carry into Taiwan increased from NT$60,000 to NT$100,000.
  - Labor insurance rate increased from 9.5% to 10%.
  - Singaporean singer JJ Lin was punched during an autograph session in Ximending, Taipei.
- 2 January – Singer Jody Chiang announced that she would end her singing career in 2015.
- 5 January
  - Former President Chen Shui-bian released from Taichung Prison on medical parole.
  - Body of a Taiwanese victim killed during the 2014 Shanghai stampede brought back to Taiwan.
- 6 January – Weekend traffic control measures to be implemented in Jiaoxi Township of Yilan County.
- 7 January – Minister of Transportation and Communications Yeh Kuang-shih tendered his resignation.
- 8 January – Statement from the American Institute in Taiwan spokesperson in Taipei regarding the raising of the Flag of the Republic of China in Twin Oaks, United States that it should never happen again.
- 9 January – The Executive Yuan approved the resignation of Yeh Kuang-shih and appointed Chen Jian-yu as acting Minister of Transportation and Communication.
- 13 January
  - The World Health Organization monitors an avian flu outbreak in Taiwan, as H5N8 avian flu virus infects nine farms.
  - Shooting at Ximending, Taipei killing two.
- 16 January – Magistrate Wei Ming-ku announced the new NT$30,000 baby bonus per birth in Changhua County.
- 17 January
  - 2015 Kuomintang chairmanship by-election.
  - India Nobel laureate Kailash Satyarthi on tour around Hualien County.
- 18 January – Kinmen Marathon in Kinmen County.
- 19 January
  - Eric Chu inaugurated as Chairperson of Kuomintang.
  - Shooting at Taichung Airport, Taichung killing one and injuring two.
  - Resignation of Taipei City Government Department of Sports head Jongher Yang (楊忠和).
  - The annual electricity rate increase in Taiwan would be kept maximum at 6% starting April 2015.
- 20 January
  - 60th anniversary of the Battle of Yijiangshan Islands.
  - Wistron Corporation opened a research center in Kaohsiung.
  - The assignment of Rafael Sierra Fernando Quesada as the ambassador of Honduras to the Republic of China.
  - Fire at a bowling center in Xinwu District, Taoyuan killing six firefighters.
- 21 January – The announcement of European Chamber of Commerce Taiwan board of members for 2015.
- 22 January – Nearly 1,000 China Airlines employees took to the street in Taipei to protest their year end bonus cut.
- 23 January
  - 2015 World Freedom Day celebration at Grand Hotel, Taipei.
  - Chen Jian-yu appointed as Minister of Transportation and Communications.
  - Hung Meng-chi appointed as Minister of Culture.
  - Shyu Jyuo-min appointed as Minister of Science and Technology.
- 25 January – The establishment of New Power Party.
- 26–27 January – National Energy Conference at Taipei International Convention Center in Taipei.
- 27 January
  - Resignation of National Defense Minister Yen Ming.
  - The opening of a Muslim prayer room at Taipei Railway Station, Taipei.
- 28 January – Republic of China Navy military drill in Kaohsiung.
- 29 January
  - Resignation of National Development Council Minister Kuan Chung-ming.
  - Scaffolding collapse accident killing one and injuring two at Chinese Culture and Movie Center in Taipei.
  - 7th regular meeting of Cross-Strait Economic Cooperation Committee at Grand Hotel in Taipei.
  - Taipei Mayor Ko Wen-je proposed Two Countries, One System for cross-strait relations.
- 30 January
  - Kao Kuang-chi took office as Minister of National Defense.
  - Yen Teh-fa took office as Chief of the General Staffs of the Republic of China Armed Forces.

=== February ===
- 4 February
  - TransAsia Airways Flight 235 crash landed in Taipei.
  - Woody Duh took office as Minister of National Development Council.
- 6 February
  - Resignation of National Security Council Secretary-General King Pu-tsung.
  - Resignation of Presidential Office Secretary-General Timothy Yang.
- 7 February
  - 2015 Republic of China legislative bi-election for five vacant seats.
  - The opening of 2015 Yangmingshan Flower Festival at Yangming Park and Floriculture Experiment Center at Yangmingshan, Taipei.
  - Two stranded on a Ferris wheel at Dream Mall, Kaohsiung.
- 8 February – Taipei Charity Marathon held in Taipei.
- 9 February – The price increase of gas and diesel fuel by NT$1.9 and NT$2.0 respectively.
- 10 February
  - ROC flags flew half-mast to commemorate the victims of TransAsia Airways Flight 235 crash.
  - Resignation of Mainland Affairs Council Minister Wang Yu-chi.
  - The opening of Taipei International Comics and Animation Festival in Taipei.
- 11 February
  - Six armed inmates took hostages at Kaohsiung Prison in Kaohsiung.
  - Kao Koong-lian appointed as director of Mainland Affairs Department of Kuomintang.
- 11–16 February – The 2015 Taipei International Book Exhibition at Taipei World Trade Center, Taipei.
- 13 February – The opening of the first H&M store in Taiwan located in Taipei.
- 14 February
  - Tsai Ing-wen announced her intention to join Democratic Progressive Party (DPP) primary for 2016 presidential election.
- 16 February – Andrew Hsia appointed as Minister of Mainland Affairs Council replacing Wang Yu-chi.
- 23 February – Food poisoning affected 120 tourists at Wuling Farm in Taichung.

=== March ===
- 5 March – Food poisoning affected 80 students from New Taipei Ankang High School during graduation trip to Kaohsiung.
- 9 March – Resignation of DPP spokesperson Hsu Chia-ching (徐佳青).
- 13 March – The establishment of Minkuotang party.
- 16 March – Two killed after a light aircraft plunged into Dapeng Bay in Pingtung County.
- 18 March – Demonstration marking one year anniversary of Sunflower Student Movement outside Legislative Yuan in Taipei.
- 20 March
  - New uniform for Chunghwa Post staffs unveiled in Taipei.
  - The opening of exhibitions on Kinmen, Matsu and Penghu in Taipei.
- 21 March – The removal of Chiang Kai-shek's statues from 14 elementary and junior high schools in Tainan.
- 28 March – The wrong use of People's Liberation Army picture for Republic of China Armed Forces recruitment promotion posters during family visit day at 206 Army Infantry Brigade's Third Battalion in Guanxi Township, Hsinchu County.
- 29 March – Civil Aeronautics Administration announced the minimum of two flight crew members in airplane cockpit at all times during flight.

=== April ===
- 1 April – Two McDonnell Douglas F/A-18 Hornet of United States landed at Tainan Air Force Base due to emergency.
- 2 April – Tigerair Taiwan first flight to Japan.
- 9 April – 100th anniversary of Dafen Incident (大分事件) commemorated in Zhuoxi Township, Hualien County.
- 10 April
  - Accident at Taichung MRT construction site killing 4 in Taichung.
  - The discovery of a new snake species named Pareas Atayal.
- 13–14 April – International Symposium on Muslim Minorities and Contemporary Challenges in Taipei.
- 15 April – Tsai Ing-wen elected as candidate of Democratic Progressive Party for 2016 Republic of China presidential election.
- 17 April – Free Taiwan Party founded by Tsay Ting-kuei.
- 20 April
  - 6.3 magnitude earthquake struck northeastern coast of Taiwan, killing 1.
- 24 April – One reactor of Kuosheng Nuclear Power Plant in New Taipei City underwent scheduled maintenance.
- 27 April – One reactor of Maanshan Nuclear Power Plant in Pingtung County was shut down after a fire broke out.

=== May ===
- 4–8 May – First stage of the 31st Han Kuang Exercise.
- 15 May – The opening of Syntrend Creative Park in Zhongzheng District, Taipei.
- 20 May – The forced landing of Republic of China Army Bell OH-58 Kiowa helicopter at Nantou County Stadium in Nantou County due to suspected mechanical failure.
- 23–24 May – Head of Taiwan Affairs Office Zhang Zhijun visit to Kinmen.
- 25 May – Tsai Ing-wen inaugurated her presidential campaign office in Taipei.
- 28 May – The renaming of British Trade and Cultural Office to British Office Taipei in Taipei.
- 29 May
  - Electricity reserve margin fell to 3.17%, the lowest in 10 years.
  - Attacked on an elementary school girl which eventually led to her death by perpetrator Kung Chung-an (龔重安) at Wenhua Elementary School in Beitou District, Taipei.

=== June ===
- 4 June – The opening of Saint Lucia embassy in Taipei.
- 5 June – Six inmates executed by gunshot to heart at Taipei, Taichung, Tainan and Kaohsiung Prisons.
- 9–13 June – The visit of São Tomé and Príncipe National Assembly President José da Graça Diogo to Taiwan.
- 10 June – Magistrate Lee Chin-yung promulgated regulation to ban the use of coal and petroleum coke burning by factories in Yunlin County.
- 15 June – The enactment of Greenhouse Gas Reduction and Management Act by Legislative Yuan.
- 27 June – An explosion at Formosa Fun Coast in New Taipei injuring almost 500 people.
- 29 June – The opening of Keelung Station new building in Ren'ai District, Keelung.

=== July ===
- 1 July
  - The world's largest vertical garden as part of Cleanaway Co., Ltd. fencing in Gangshan, Kaohsiung was announced.
  - The promulgation of Greenhouse Gas Reduction and Management Act by President Ma Ying-jeou.
- 2 July
  - Peng Ming-min and more than thirty others establish the Taiwan Independence Action Party (Chinese: 台灣獨立行動黨).
  - At 1:48 p.m., electricity load reaches its highest peak ever in Taiwan history at 35,380 MW.
- 4 July – The opening of Yilan International Children's Folklore and Folkgame Festival at Dongshan River Water Park in Yilan County.
- 8 July – The swearing in of Chen Ming-cheng (陳銘政) and Lee Chao-cheng (李朝成) as the ROC representative to Poland and India respectively.
- 15 July – Kuomintang announced the expulsion of its five party members because of harming party's reputation and interests.
- 19 July – Nomination of Hung Hsiu-chu as the Kuomintang candidate for 2016 Republic of China presidential election.
- 20 July
  - Knife attack at Zhongshan Station in Taipei, injuring four.
  - Signing of water supply agreement from Mainland China to Kinmen.
- 21 July – The appointment of Yang Kuo-chiang as the Director-General of National Security Bureau.
- 24 July – 33 students arrested for breaking into the Ministry of Education building.
- 25 July
  - Jacob Chang (張大同) takes over as the ROC Representative to Singapore.
  - The relocation and reopening of Kaohsiung Museum of Labor in Cianjin District, Kaohsiung.
- 29 July
  - The visit of Shanghai vice mayor Wang Tiehui (翁鐵慧) to Taiwan.
  - Taipei City Government deploys additional 124 security guards in Taipei Metro network following a recent knife attack.

=== August ===
- 1 August
  - The official adoption of revised China-centric senior high school history curriculum guidelines.
- 6 August – James Soong joined the 2016 Republic of China presidential election as People First Party candidate.
- 7 August – A total of 3 hours downtime of the emergency management information center of Central Emergency Operation Center.
- 8 August
  - Typhoon Soudelor makes a landfall in Taiwan.
  - The upgrade of Yuanlin from an urban township to a county-administered city of Changhua County.
  - The tuned mass damper of Taipei 101 moves 100 cm due to Typhoon Soudelor, the biggest movement in the building history.
  - The visit of Polish Deputy Marshal of Sejm Elżbieta Radziszewska to Taiwan for 6-day visit.
- 9 August – 4.85 million households were left without electricity due to Typhoon Soudelor, the most cases of power outage ever in Taiwan due to storm.
- 17 August – New Guatemalan Ambassador to the Republic of China Olga Maria Aguja Zuniga presents her credentials in Taipei.
- 18 August – The arrival of Saint Kitts and Nevis Prime Minister Timothy Harris to Taiwan for a 5-day official visit.
- 19 August – The establishment of Social Welfare Party (Chinese: 社會福利黨).
- 20 August
  - Central Weather Bureau issues sea warning for Typhoon Goni in water off southeastern Taiwan.
  - A total of 1,734 tourists evacuated from Green Island ahead of Typhoon Goni.
  - Bruce Linghu named Vice Minister of Foreign Affairs.
- 23 August
  - Memorial service commemorating 57th anniversary of the Second Taiwan Strait Crisis in Kinmen County.
  - Central Weather Bureau lifted sea warning for Typhoon Goni in water off southeastern Taiwan.
  - A boy punched a hole on Paolo Porpora painting displayed at Huashan 1914 Creative Park in Zhongzheng District, Taipei.
- 29 August – A rollover accident at Yangmingshan involving a bus injures over 20 passengers.

=== September ===
- 1 September
  - 70th anniversary of the Japanese Instrument of Surrender.
  - The daily quota mainland Chinese travelers to Penghu, Kinmen and Matsu increased from 500 to 1,000.
- 5 September – The opening of Fuguijiao Lighthouse in Shimen District, New Taipei.
- 6 September – The start of 5-day official visit of El Salvador Vice President Óscar Ortiz to Taiwan.
- 8 September – Resignation of Yilan County Government secretary-general Chen Shin-yi (陳鑫益) over farm house scandal.
- 16 September – More than 20 earthquakes struck Taiwan.
- 21 September – The opening of a Muslim prayer room at Taichung HSR station, Taichung.
- 21–27 September – 2015 OEC Kaohsiung
- 22 September – The missing and subsequently crash of an AIDC AT-3 in Mount Mabolasi, Nantou County after departure from Kaohsiung.
- 28 September – Typhoon Dujuan makes a landfall in Taiwan.

=== October ===
- 2 October – Representative of Canada to the Republic of China Mario Ste-Marie takes office.
- 16 October
  - Political Deputy Minister of Culture Vicki Chiu (邱于芸) fired from her position due to leaking official documents.
  - The opening of Lizihnei Station of Kaohsiung LRT in Cianjhen District, Kaohsiung.
- 17 October – Eric Chu elected as Kuomintang candidate for 2016 Republic of China presidential election replacing Hung Hsiu-chu.
- 19 October
  - The derailment of Kaohsiung Light Rail during trial run due to switch problem.
- 20 October – Republic of China ambassador to Paraguay Alexander Yui presents his credentials to President Horacio Cartes.
- 25 October – 70th anniversary of Retrocession Day commemoration.
- 31 October – The release of two Taiwanese intelligence officers Colonel Chu Kung-hsun (朱恭訓) and Colonel Hsu Chang-kuo (徐章國) by Mainland China and their return to Taiwan.

=== November ===
- 2 November
  - Financial Supervisory Commission chairperson Tseng Ming-chung announces that Bitcoin transactions within Taiwan are illegal.
  - Underground oil pipeline in Xizhi District, New Taipei City ruptured which injured several passing motorcyclists.
- 5 November – 3 died in shooting at Mayfull Foods Corporation headquarters in Neihu District, Taipei.
- 7 November – Ma Ying-jeou and Xi Jinping meet in Singapore, the first meeting of People's Republic of China and Republic of China leaders since 1949.
- 13 November – The first Saint Lucian Ambassador to the Republic of China Hubert Emmanuel presents his credentials to Foreign Minister David Lin.
- 14 November – Two servicemen died after their armored vehicle plunged into Tai Lake during routine operation in Kinmen.
- 15 November – 2015 Taiwan Cycling Festival around Sun Moon Lake at Yuchi Township, Nantou County.
- 16 November – Tsai Ing-wen officially introduced Chen Chien-jen as her running mate for the 2016 presidential election.
- 18 November
  - Eric Chu officially introduced Wang Ju-hsuan as his running mate for the 2016 presidential election.
  - A live fire military exercise held in Penghu County.
- 21 November
  - James Soong and running mate Hsu Hsin-ying opened up their presidential election campaign office in Taipei.
  - 12th round of cross-strait trade talks at Grand Hotel, Taipei.
  - 52nd Golden Horse Film Festival and Awards at Sun Yat-sen Memorial Hall, Taipei.
- 22 November
  - Emerald Pacific Airlines Bell 206B helicopter crashed in Taishan District, New Taipei during overhead power line insulator cleaning killing two on board.
  - Autumn Struggle protest march in Taipei by more than 50 social and labor groups.
- 24 November – Executive Yuan approved the resignation of Political Deputy Minister Wu Mei-hung from Mainland Affairs Council which will take effect on 2 December 2015.
- 25 November – Former New Taipei Deputy Mayor Hsu Chih-chien (許志堅) prosecuted by Taipei District Prosecutor's Office for violating anti-corruption act.
- 27 November
  - Ting Hsin Oil and Fat Industrial Co. former chairperson Wei Ying-chung (魏應充) found not guilty for 2014 Taiwan food scandal by Changhua District Court.
  - The start of 10-day Clay Sculpture Festival near Changhua HSR station in Tianzhong Township, Changhua County.
- 29 November – Cross-strait talks between ARATS and SEF on existing trade and economic agreements between the two sides.
- 30 November – Association for Relations Across the Taiwan Straits President Chen Deming 7-day visit around Taiwan.

=== December ===
- 1 December – The opening of Miaoli Station, Changhua Station and Yunlin Station of Taiwan High Speed Rail.
- 2 December
  - Shooting in Taibao City, Chiayi County leaving 1 killed and 1 injured.
  - Resignation of Mainland Affairs Council Political Deputy Minister Wu Mei-hung.
- 7 December – Taipei Metro station announcements use Mandarin, English, Taiwanese and Hakka sequence.
- 8 December – 6-day official visit of Nauru President Baron Waqa to Taiwan.
- 15 December – One generation unit of Taichung Power Plant was shut down to reduce air pollution level.
- 17 December – The arrival of UH-60M Black Hawk helicopter at Port of Kaohsiung from the United States.
- 21–22 December – Three college students held hostage in Taitung City, Taitung County.
- 23 December – The opening of Zhuzihu Ponlai Rice Foundation Seed Field Story House in Beitou District, Taipei.
- 28 December – The soft opening of the Southern Branch of the National Palace Museum in Taibao City, Chiayi County.
- 30 December – Hotline connecting head of Mainland Affairs Council and head of Taiwan Affairs Office was established.

== Deaths ==
- 13 January – Shih Chi-ching, 68, Taiwanese feminist writer, heart attack.
- 18 January
  - Yasuaki Taiho, 51, Taiwanese baseball player (Chunichi Dragons, Hanshin Tigers).
  - Lai Pi-hsia, 82, Taiwanese singer.
- 21 January – Chin Shunshin, 90, Taiwanese-Japanese writer.
- 15 February – Wang Hsuan-yi, 59, Taiwanese food critic, heart attack.
- 24 February – Tyzen Hsiao, 77, Taiwanese composer.
- 3 March – Lucille Han, 57, Taiwanese food critic, uterine sarcoma.
- 6 March – Andrew Oung, 64, Taiwanese businessman and politician, MLY (1993–1996).
- 18 March – Chiang Chung-ling, 92, Taiwanese politician, Defense Minister (1994–1999).
- 27 March – George Wang, 96, Taiwanese actor.
- 9 April – Kuo Ting-tsai, 78, Taiwanese politician, MLY (1993–2002), complications of cancer.
- 21 April – Cindy Yang, 24, Taiwanese actress, inert gas asphyxiation.
- 2 May – Ma Shui-long, 75, Taiwanese composer.
- 20 May – Paul Liao, 67, Taiwanese businessman, lung cancer.
- 1 June – An Jun Can, 31, Taiwanese singer (Comic Boyz) and actor, liver cancer.
- 8 June – Lynn Miles, 71, American human rights and Taiwan democracy activist, cancer.
- 21 June – Tseng Chung-ming, 60, Deputy Minister of Health and Welfare (2013–2015), cirrhosis and lung cancer.
- 8 July – Liao Chih-te (廖枝德), 86, Taiwanese master carpenter.
- 18 July – Yang Ko-han, 27, Taiwanese actress, suicide by hanging leading to brain death.
- 21 July – Ho Sheng-lung, 62, Taiwanese politician, MLY (1998–1999), liver cancer.
- 29 August – Luo Lan, 96, Taiwanese writer and radio personality, cardiopulmonary failure.
- 28 November – Lin Rong-San, 76, Taiwanese politician and newspaper publisher, cardiopulmonary failure.
- 6 December
  - Ko Chun-hsiung, 70, Taiwanese actor and politician, MLY (2005–2008), lung cancer.
  - Wu Te-mei, 68, Taiwanese politician, MLY (1984–1996), kidney failure caused by diabetes.
