= 2018 in Taiwan =

- Decades: 1990s; 2000s; 2010s; 2020s
- See also: Other events of 2018; History of Taiwan • Timeline • Years

Events from the year 2018 in Taiwan, Republic of China. This year is numbered Minguo 107 according to the official Republic of China calendar.

== Incumbents ==
- President: Tsai Ing-wen
- Vice President: Chen Chien-jen
- Premier: William Lai
- Vice Premier: Shih Jun-ji

== Events ==
=== January ===
- 10 January – The Legislative Yuan passed the Labor Law Amendment on the third reading.

=== February ===
- 1 February – The establishment of National Kaohsiung University of Science and Technology in Kaoshiung through the merger of three national universities.
- 4 February – The trial opening of Siaogangshan Skywalk Park in Gangshan District, Kaohsiung.
- 6 February – 6.4 magnitude earthquake struck Hualien County, killing 17.
- 18 February – The official opening of An-Nur Tongkang Mosque in Donggang Township, Pingtung County.
- 19 February – 6.3 magnitude earthquake struck Yilan County.
- 28 February – The United States Congress passed the Taiwan Travel Act.

=== March ===
- 16 March – Donald Trump, President of the United States, signed the Taiwan Travel Act into law.
- 18 March – The inauguration of Hualien Al-Falah Mosque in Hualien City, Hualien County.
- 30 March – The groundbreaking ceremony of Shalun Smart Green Energy Science City in Gueiren District, Tainan.

=== April ===
- 14 April – The resignation of Pan Wen-chung as Minister of Education.
- 9 April – Political parties and organizations form the Formosa Alliance.
- 28 April – The establishment of the Ocean Affairs Council.

=== May ===
- 1 May – The ROC terminates diplomatic relations with the Dominican Republic.
- 9 May – The introduction of Taiwania supercomputer.
- 24 May – The ROC terminates diplomatic relations with Burkina Faso.
- 29 May – The resignation of Wu Maw-kuen as Minister of Education.
- 31 May – The establishment of the Transitional Justice Commission.

=== June ===
- 11 June – The opening of Taipei Nan Shan Plaza in Xinyi District, Taipei.

=== August ===
- 8–15 August – 2018 Asian Men's Volleyball Cup
- 15 August
  - The opening of 1913 Antique Office of Alishan House-Local Cultural Building in Alishan Township, Chiayi County.
  - The opening of Taiwan Contemporary Culture Lab in Daan District, Taipei.
- 21 August – ROC broke diplomatic relations with El Salvador.

=== September ===
- 17–23 September – 2018 OEC Kaohsiung

=== October ===
- 8 October – The resignation of Environmental Protection Administration Deputy Minister Thomas Chan.
- 15 October – The inauguration of National Biotechnology Research Park in Nangang District, Taipei.
- 18 October – The establishment of Congress Party Alliance.
- 21 October – The 2018 Yilan train derailment kills 18 people.

=== November ===
- 24 November
  - Taiwan local elections, 2018.
  - Resignation of Tsai Ing-wen from the Chairperson of Democratic Progressive Party.
- 25 November – Resignation of Chen In-chin as Chairperson of Central Election Commission.
- 28 November – Appointment of Lin Yu-chang as the Chairperson of Democratic Progressive Party.

=== December ===
- 30 December – The opening of Kang Chu Sports Park in Shalu District, Taichung.

== Deaths ==
- 18 January – Joseph Wang Yu-jung, 86, Taiwanese Roman Catholic prelate, Bishop of Taichung (1986–2009).
- 21 January – Paul Sun, 80, Taiwanese politician, Minister of Agriculture (1992–1996), pancreatic cancer.
- 28 January – Hsu Hung-chih, 81, Taiwanese politician, Taoyuan County Magistrate (1981–1989), lung cancer.
- 5 February – Chien Te-men, 74, Taiwanese actor.
- 19 February – Cheng Jim-ming, 82, Taiwanese journalism professor, (Chinese Culture University).
- 20 February – Joe Hung, 86, Taiwanese journalist and diplomat, heart and lung disease.
- 7 March – Chen Tien-miao, 89, Taiwanese politician.
- 18 March – Li Ao, 82, Taiwanese writer, social commentator, historian, and politician, MLY (2005–2008), brain tumor.
- 19 March – Luo Fu, 89, Taiwanese poet.
- 9 April – Felix Chen, 75, Taiwanese conductor.
- 1 May – Sun Yueh, 87, Chinese-born Taiwanese actor (Papa, Can You Hear Me Sing), sepsis.
- 26 May – Clement Chang, 89, Taiwanese academic and politician, president of Tamkang University (1964–1989), member of the Taipei City Council (1969–1989), Minister of Transportation and Communications (1989–1991).
- 28 May – Wang Da-hong, 100, Chinese-born Taiwanese architect (Sun Yat-sen Memorial Hall).
- 30 May – Jack Tu, 53, Taiwanese-born Canadian cardiologist.
- 1 June – Cheng Han-chih, 89, Taiwanese agriculturalist.
- 5 June – Feng Ting-kuo, 67, Taiwanese politician, member of the Taipei City Council (1985–1988), National Assembly (1992–1996), and Legislative Yuan (1996–2008).
- 7 June – Fu Da-ren, 85, Taiwanese television presenter, assisted suicide.
- 9 June – Lin Yu-lin, 81, Taiwanese real estate developer.
- 10 July – Hu Sheng-cheng, 77, Taiwanese economist, pulmonary calcification.
- 17 July – Yang Kuo-shu, 86, Taiwanese psychologist.
- 29 July – Ma Ju-feng, 63, Taiwanese actor.
- 30 August – Yang Wei-chung, 47, Taiwanese political commentator, drowned.
- 10 September – Hu Fo, 86, Taiwanese political scientist and activist, member of Academia Sinica, fall.
- 12 September – Shen Chun-shan, 86, Taiwanese physicist and academic, President of National Tsing Hua University (1994–1997), ruptured intestine.
- 12 October – Chang Chun-Yen, 81, Taiwanese engineer, President of National Chiao Tung University, member of Academia Sinica, cancer.
- 14 October – Wu Zhaonan, 92, Taiwanese xiangsheng comedian, multiple organ failure.
- 4 November – Hung Wen-tung, 80, Taiwanese orthopedic surgeon and politician, MLY (1984–1990).
- 11 November – Zeng Shiqiang, 84, Chinese-born Taiwanese sinologist.
- 19 November – Shiao Yi, 83, Taiwanese-American wuxia novelist.
- 26 November – Lin Juei-ming, 68, Taiwanese poet.
- 3 December – Kenneth Yen, 53, Taiwanese businessman, chairman of China Motor Corporation and Yulon, esophageal cancer.
- 10 December – Chiang Pin-kung, 85, Taiwanese politician, Minister of Economic Affairs (1993–1996), Minister of the Council for Economic Planning and Development (1996–2000), Vice President of the Legislative Yuan (2002–2005), Chairman of the Straits Exchange Foundation (2008–2012), multiple organ failure.
