= 2016 in Taiwan =

- Decades: 1990s; 2000s; 2010s; 2020s
- See also: Other events of 2016; History of Taiwan • Timeline • Years

Events from the year 2016 in Taiwan.

== Incumbents ==
- President – Ma Ying-jeou, Tsai Ing-wen
- Vice President – Wu Den-yih, Chen Chien-jen
- Premier – Mao Chi-kuo, Chang San-cheng, Lin Chuan
- Vice Premier – Chang San-cheng, Woody Duh, Lin Hsi-yao

== Events ==
=== January ===
- 1 January – The opening of Taiwan New Cultural Movement Memorial Hall in Datong District, Taipei.
- 10 January – The launch of Islamic Association of Taiwan in Hualien City, Hualien County.
- 16 January
  - 2016 Taiwanese presidential election.
  - 2016 Taiwanese legislative election.
  - Resignation of Kuomintang spokesperson Yang Wei-chung (楊偉中).
  - Resignation of Kuomintang Chairman Eric Chu.
  - Resignation of Kuomintang vice-chairman Hau Lung-bin.

=== February ===
- 1 February
  - Swearing-in of new cabinet led by Premier Chang San-cheng.
  - Su Jia-chyuan sworn-in as Speaker of Legislative Yuan.
- 5 February – Mainland Affairs Council and Taiwan Affairs Office had their first conversation via the newly establish hotline connecting both heads of the offices.
- 6 February – The 6.4 M_{w} Taiwan earthquake affected the southwest part of the island with a maximum Mercalli intensity of VII (Very strong), killing 117 and injuring 550.

=== March ===
- 26 March – 2016 Kuomintang chairmanship election.

=== April ===
- 2 April – The official opening of Hushan Dam in Douliu City, Yunlin County.
- 7 April – The designation of 7 April to be the Freedom of Speech Day.
- 18 April – Wan An Exercise in Taipei, New Taipei, Taoyuan City, Yilan County, Hsinchu County, Keelung and Hsinchu City.
- 24 April – The establishment of Taiwan Muslim Association at At-Taqwa Mosque in Dayuan District, Taoyuan City.

=== May ===
- 9 May – The opening of Taroko Park in Cianjhen District, Kaohsiung.
- 12 May
  - Resignation en masse of Executive Yuan led by Premier Chang San-cheng.
  - Agricultural cooperation agreement with Indonesia signed in Taipei.
- 18 May – Appointment of Hau Lung-pin, Jason Hu and Lin Junq-tzer as Vice Chairpersons of Kuomintang.
- 20 May
  - The inauguration of Tsai Ing-wen as the President of the Republic of China at the Presidential Office Building in Taipei.
  - The appointment of Cheng Shu-cheng (曾旭正) as the Deputy Minister of National Development Council.
  - The appointment of Tsai Mi-ching as the Deputy Minister of Science and Technology.
  - The appointment of Weng Chang-liang (翁章梁) as the Deputy Minister of Council of Agriculture.
  - The appointment of Kuo Kuo-wen as the Deputy Minister of Labor.
  - The appointment of Lee Wen-chung and Liu Shu-lin (劉樹林) as the Deputy Ministers of Veterans Affairs Council.
- 25 May – Tsai Ing-wen sworn in as Chairperson of Democratic Progressive Party for another term.
- 27 May – The inauguration of Wanhua Lin's Mansion in Wanhua District, Taipei.

=== June ===
- 25 June – the Taoyuan Flight Attendants Union, representing some 2500 cabin crew from China Airlines, staged the first strike in Taiwanese aviation history. A total of 122 China Airlines-passenger flights from Taoyuan International Airport and Taipei Songshan Airport were cancelled as a result. The strike ended within a day following government intervention, replacement of top officials, and management-representatives conditionally agreeing to all seven demands from the union.

=== July ===
- 1 July
  - The opening of Nangang Station of Taiwan High Speed Rail in Nangang District, Taipei.
  - Hsiung Feng III missile mishap off Penghu, killing 1 and injuring 3.
- 3 July – The opening of Hamasen Museum of Taiwan Railway in Yancheng District, Kaohsiung.
- 7 July – Typhoon Nepartak makes landfall, killing three people and injuring 142.
- 19 July – Bus accident in Taoyuan City killing 24 Mainland Chinese tourists with its Taiwanese driver and tour guide.
- 23 July – The official opening of the High-Heel Wedding Church in Budai Township, Chiayi County.

=== August ===
- 22–26 August – The 32nd Han Kuang Exercise.
- 26 August – The opening of Taichung Literature Museum in West District, Taichung.

=== September ===
- 5 September – Kaohsiung and Panama City signed sister city agreement.
- 13 September – Typhoon Meranti made landfall in Southern Taiwan, killing 1.
- 17–25 September – 2016 OEC Kaohsiung
- 27 September – Typhoon Megi made landfall in Eastern Taiwan, killing 4.

=== November ===
- 1 November – The merging of National Hsinchu University of Education with National Tsing Hua University.
- 16 November – The opening of DONG Energy branch office in Taiwan.
- 22 November – TransAsia Airways ceased operations.
- 24 November – Chien-Cheng Circle started to be demolished.

=== December ===
- 10 December – The opening of Ama Museum in Datong District, Taipei.
- 12 December – Start of the 2017 IIHF Women's World Championship Division II qualification round.
- 20 December – São Tomé and Príncipe terminated diplomatic relations with the ROC.
- 30 December – The opening of Chaoma Sports Center in Xitun District, Taichung.

== Deaths ==
- 11 January – Cheng Chen Tao, 93, Taiwanese comfort woman.
- 15 January – Tsai Chen-yang, 66, Taiwanese businessman, heart attack.
- 20 January – Chang Yung-fa, 88, Taiwanese businessman (Evergreen Group).
- 17 February – Liu Wan-lai, 87, Taiwanese translator.
- 26 February – Loh I-Cheng, 92, Taiwanese diplomat.
- 10 March – Fangge Dupan, 89, Taiwanese poet.
- 18 March – Kong Jaw-sheng, 60, Taiwanese banker, chairman of the FSC (2004–2006), heart attack.
- 1 April
  - Kao Ching-yuen, 87, Taiwanese businessman (Uni-President Enterprises Corporation) (death announced on this date).
  - Mei Ko-wan, 98, Taiwanese academic administrator, President of Central Police University (1966–1973) and Tunghai University (1978–1992).
- 8 April – Wei Chueh, 88, Taiwanese Buddhist monk.
- 21 May – Ku Chin-shui, 56, Taiwanese aboriginal athlete, plasma cell leukemia.
- 27 May – Wang You-theng, 89, Taiwanese entrepreneur, (Rebar), traffic collision.
- 29 May – Tien Chih-hsuan, 56, Taiwanese politician, Mayor of Hualien City, lung cancer.
- 31 May – Chen Wei-chau, 62, Taiwanese businessman (TransAsia Airways), heart attack.
- 1 June – Wang Jui, 85, Taiwanese actor, heart and lung failure.
- 27 July – Lin Kuo-hua, 80, Taiwanese politician, MLY (1999–2005).
- 6 August – Chow Lien-hwa, 96, Taiwanese Christian minister.
- 9 August – Wang Tuoh, 72, Taiwanese writer and politician, complications of a heart attack.
- 27 August – Yang Nan-chun, 86, Taiwanese mountaineer, esophageal cancer.
- 7 September – Lee Tang-hua, 90, Taiwanese acrobat.
- 8 October – Kuo Chin-fa, 72, Taiwanese Hokkien pop singer, cardiorespiratory failure.
- 16 October – Jacques Picoux, 67, French artist, fall.
- 8 November – Ho Chih-chin, 64, Taiwanese politician, Minister of Finance.
- 18 November – Liu Sung-pan, 84, Taiwanese politician, MLY (1973–2004), PLY (1992–1998).
- 22 November – Chen Yingzhen, 79, Taiwanese writer.
- 28 November – Ng Bi-chu, 88, Taiwanese activist (228 Incident), complications of diabetes.
- 30 November
  - Peng Chang-kuei, 98, Taiwanese chef, (General Tso's chicken) pneumonia.
  - Vivian, 43, Taiwanese astrologer.
- 1 December – Bor-ming Jahn, 76, Taiwanese-French geochemist.
- 8 December – Sung Ching-yun, 94, Taiwanese agriculturalist.
- 26 December – Robert Storey, 63, American-born Taiwanese travel writer.
