= Xian ling (religion) =

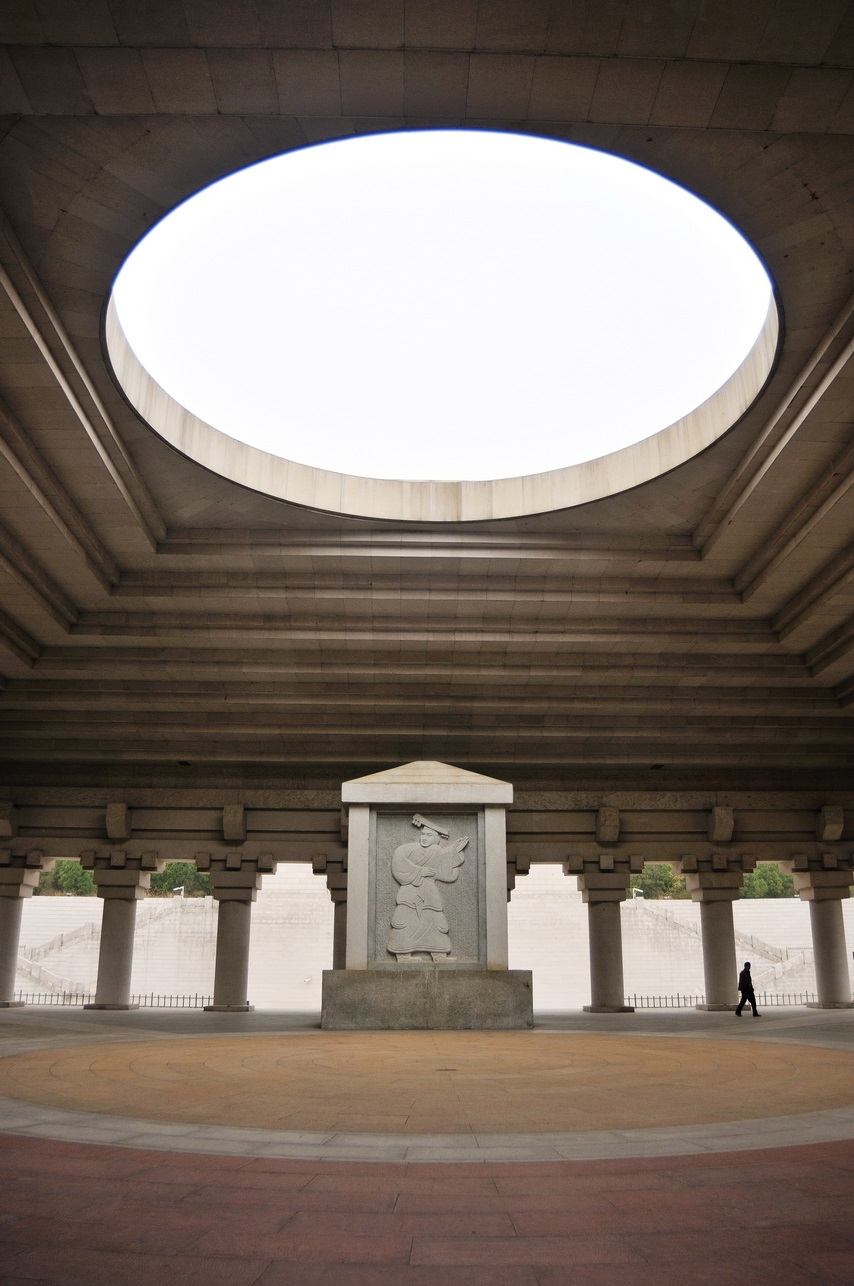
Yellow Emperor stele in the sacrificial hall of the Xuanyuan Temple, in Huangling, Yan'an, Shaanxi.

Xian ling (simplified Chinese: 显灵; traditional Chinese: 顯靈; pinyin: xiǎn líng) is the notion of a numinous, sacred (ling) presence of a god or gods in the Chinese traditional religion. The term can be variously translated as "divine efficacy", "divine virtue", or also "efficacious response"; these terms describe the manifestation and activity of the power of a god (灵气; 靈氣; líng qì, "divine energy" or "divine effervescence", see qi). (Note: Zavidovskaya, EA. page 183. Retrieved on 9 June 2014)

Within the context of traditional cosmology, the interaction of these energies constitutes the universe (the All-God, Tian), and their proper cultivation (bao ying) upholds the human world order.

== Reciprocity to divine response: rite and virtuous deed ==
The relationship between men and gods is one of reciprocal exchange of energy and the cultivation of godly energy. Through rituals of worship and proper conduct, people acquire and maintain a sense of stable world order, peace, and balance (bao ying). Violating the rule of reciprocity may undermine the balance and invite chaos.

The attitudes of the people towards their deities is one of awe and apprehension. Through devotional practices, a person strives to secure balance and protect himself and the world in which he is located from the power of unfavorable forces. In this sense, the traditional Chinese view of human life is not fatalistic, but is one in which one is the master of his own life through his relationship with the divine energies.

Within temples it is common to see banners bearing the phrase: "If the heart is sincere, god will reveal his power" (心诚则灵; 心誠則靈; xīn chéng zé líng). This implies the belief that gods respond to the entreaties of the believer if his or her religious fervor is sincere (诚心; 誠心; chéngxīn). If a person sincerely believes in the gods' powers and accumulates the energy of piety, the gods are confident in his faith and reveal their efficacious powers. At the same time, for faith to strengthen in the devotee's heart, the deity must prove his or her efficacy.

Worship consists of the display of reverence or respect (jìngshén 敬神) for the gods, honoring them through the fulfillment of vows (还愿; 還願; huányuàn'). In most of the cases, vow-fulfillment is expressed in material form, for example jingxiang offering rituals. Many people repay vows to the gods by contributing incense, oil, candles, and money. (Note: Lizhu, Na. 2013. p. 10) Religious devotion may also be expressed in the form of performance troupes (花会; 花會; huāhuì) involving stilt walkers, lion dancers, musicians, martial arts masters, yangge dancers, and story-tellers. Some gods are considered carnivorous, for example river deities (héshén 河神), or the Longwang; offerings to these require an animal sacrifice (shēngsì 生祀), while other deities, for example Zhenwu, do not ask for animal sacrifice. (Note: Zavidovskaya, EA. page 189. Retrieved on 9 June 2014)

A deity may also require, in exchange for his or her help through divine effervescence, that people act morally and perform good works, virtuous deeds (shànshì 善事), and practice self-cultivation (xiūxíng 修行). (Note: Zavidovskaya, EA. page 191. Retrieved on 9 June 2014) To this end, some forms of local religion develop prescriptions for believers, such as detailed lists of meritorious and sinful deeds in the form of "books of virtue" (善书; 善書; shànshū). This usually refers to religious booklets distributed for free.) and "ledgers of merit" (功过格; 功過格; gōngguò gé). This refers to a kind of log which one uses to record good and bad deeds he or she has done every day. This is arbitrary for some Quanzhen Daoist priests). (Note: Zavidovskaya, EA. page 182. Retrieved on 9 June 2014) Involvement in the affairs of communal or intra-village temples are perceived by believers as ways of accumulating merit (gōngdé 功德). "Doing good deeds to accumulate virtue" (行善积德; 行善積德; xíng shàn jī dé) is a common formula for religious practice. (Note: Zavidovskaya, EA. page 187. Retrieved on 9 June 2014) Virtue is believed to accumulate in one's heart, which is seen as the energetic center of the human body (zài jūn xīn zuò fú tián 在君心作福田).

== Temples and holy locations: shrines of divine effervescence ==
The term xian ling may be interpreted as the god revealing his divine presence in a particular area and temple, through events perceived as extraordinary, miraculous, and filling the place of their ling qi. (Note: Zavidovskaya, EA. page 184. Retrieved on 9 June 2014) Divine power usually manifests in public; once the event is witnessed and acknowledged, reports about it spread quickly and the cult of the deity establishes itself and grows in popularity, and temples are built.

Scholar Zavidovskaya studied the ways the incentive of temple restoration since the 1980s in northern China was triggered by numerous instances of gods becoming "active" and "returning", and claiming back their temples and places in society. She cites a Chenghuang Temple in Yulin, Shaanxi Province that, during the Cultural Revolution, was turned into a granary; in the 1980s the temple was restored to its original function because the seeds kept in the temple always rotted. This event was recognized as a sign from the god Chenghuang to empty his residence of grain and let him back in. The 靈氣; língqì (灵气; 靈氣), divine energy, is believed to accumulate in certain places, such as temples, making them holy. Temples with a long history are considered holier than newly built ones, which still need to be filled by divine energy.

Zavidovskaya also cited an example of the cult of the god Zhenwu in Congluoyu Town (丛罗峪镇; 叢羅峪鎮; cóngluóyù zhèn, Lin County, Lüliang), Shanxi Province. The temples were in ruins and the cult was inactive until the mid-1990s, when a man with terminal cancer prayed (bài 拜) to Zhenwu. (Note: Zavidovskaya, EA. page 185. Retrieved on 9 June 2014) The man began to recover, and after a year he was completely healed. To thank the god, he organized an opera performance in his honor. A temporary altar with a statue of Zhenwu and a stage for performances were set up in an open space at the foot of a mountain. While the opera was being performed, large, white snakes appeared; they were unafraid of people and did not attack them, seemingly watching the opera. The snakes were considered by locals as incarnations of Zhenwu, who came to watch the opera held in his honor.

== Kinds of efficacy ==
The most common display of divine power is the cure of diseases after a follower asks for aid. Another manifestation is the fulfillment of a request by children. The deity may also manifest through media, entering the body of a shaman-medium and speaking through his or her lips. There have been cases of people curing illnesses "on behalf of a god" (tì shén zhì bìng 替神治病). Gods may also speak to people when they are asleep (托梦; 托夢 or 託夢; tuōmèng ).

== See also ==
- Numen
- Divine presence
- Chinese folk religion
- Wu
- Bao ying
- Ming yun
- Yuan fen

== Sources ==
- Ekaterina A. Zavidovskaya. Deserving Divine Protection: Religious Life in Contemporary Rural Shanxi and Shaanxi Provinces. St. Petersburg Annual of Asian and African Studies. Ergon-Verlag GmbH, 97074 Würzburg, Vol. I, 2012, pp. 179–197.
- Fan Lizhu, Chen Na. The Revival of Indigenous Religion in China. Fudan University, 2013.
