= 羅蘭 =

羅蘭 may refer to:

- Law Lan (born 1934), actress from Hong Kong
- Luo Lan (1919–2015), Taiwanese writer and radio personality
