= Xianling =

Xianling or Xian ling may refer to:

- Xian ling (religion), notion of numinous presence in the Chinese traditional religion
- County magistrate (Chinese: 縣令; pinyin: Xiànlìng) in Imperial and early Republican China
- Xianling ("Xian Mausoleum"), burial sites of several Chinese emperors and/or their families:
  - Xianling (Chinese: 獻陵; pinyin: Xiàn líng) in Sanyuan County, Shaanxi, tomb of Emperor Gaozu of Tang
  - Xianling (Chinese: 顯陵; pinyin: Xiǎn líng) in Yiyang County, Henan, tomb of Shi Jingtang
  - Xianling (Chinese: 顯陵; pinyin: Xiǎn líng) in Beizhen, Liaoning, tomb of Emperor Shizong of Liao
  - Xianling (Chinese: 獻陵; pinyin: Xiàn líng) in Yinchuan, Ningxia, tomb of Emperor Huizong of Western Xia
  - Xianling (Chinese: 顯陵; pinyin: Xiǎn líng) in Yinchuan, Ningxia, tomb of Emperor Chongzong of Western Xia
  - Xianling (Chinese: 獻陵; pinyin: Xiàn líng) in Changping District, Beijing, tomb of the Hongxi Emperor
  - Xianling (Chinese: 顯陵; pinyin: Xiǎn líng) in Zhongxiang, Hubei, tomb of Zhu Youyuan
