= Wu Te-mei =

Taiwanese politician (1947–2015)

Wu Te-mei MLY
- 吳德美

Member of the Legislative Yuan
- In office 1 February 1990 – 31 January 1996
- Constituency: Kaohsiung 2
- In office 1 February 1984 – 31 January 1990
- Constituency: Kaohsiung

Member of the Kaohsiung City Council
- In office December 1981 – December 1985

Personal details
- Born: 23 November 1947 Kaohsiung
- Died: 6 December 2015 (aged 68) Cianjhen, Kaohsiung
- Party: Kuomintang
- Spouse: Chu An-hsiung
- Children: 3
- Occupation: politician

Wu Te-mei (Chinese: 吳德美; 23 November 1947 – 6 December 2015) was a Taiwanese politician.

Wu was born on 23 November 1947 in Kaohsiung. In 1972, her husband Chu An-hsiung mounted an independent bid for the Kaohsiung City Council. For supporting his campaign, Wu was expelled from the Kuomintang. Wu herself served on the Kaohsiung City Council between 1981 and 1985. In 1983, Wu won her first election to the Legislative Yuan, and retained her seat in 1986, 1989, and 1993.

Throughout their political careers, Wu and Chu invested in several businesses. In May 2000, the couple were charged with accounting fraud. By December 2002, when Chu was elected city council speaker, the case had not yet been heard in court. Later that month, both Wu and Chu were arrested and a court hearing was scheduled for January 2003. Shortly after questioning by prosecutors, Wu was released on bail while Chu remained in custody. Chu did not report to the Kaohsiung District Prosecutors' Office to begin serving his sentence in October 2003. The next month, Wu claimed that Chu's political rival Chen Tien-miao had bought votes to win the 1994 speakership election and called for the Kaohsiung District Prosecutors' Office to investigate him. The allegations were made on the same day the Kaohsiung District Court had sentenced Wu to six months imprisonment. Her sentence was eventually extended to six years and eight months, which she began serving in 2009. Wu was released on medical parole in 2013 and underwent dialysis treatments. The Kaohsiung District Court ruled in a separate case heard in February 2010, that Wu was guilty of vote buying on her daughter's behalf in a 2006 municipal election. Wu died aged 68 on 6 December 2015, of kidney failure caused by diabetes. Chu, who had left for China, did not return for Wu's funeral held on 21 December 2015.
