= Ling (Chinese religion) =

Ling (simplified Chinese: 灵; traditional Chinese: 靈; pinyin: líng, Vietnamese: linh) is the notion of sacred in Chinese traditional religions.

== Overview ==
=== Xian ling and shen ===
It is the state or power of gods and divine beings (shen) that is multiplied by their appearance in vision during trance or by location through a ritual of inspiration into the objects that represent them. Their activity, actuality, is xian ling, literally "holy virtue, sacred efficacy, the sacred as manifest", or numen. Ling is a power, like that of the uncanny intelligence of great masters of building or of healing, and is a divine reciprocation for offerings and pledges of devotion to a deity or demon.

=== Mediation of yin and yang ===
It is the inchoate order of creation, that is the "medium" of the bivalency constituted by the opposite forces of the universe (yin and yang). Ling is the mediating bivalency, the "medium", between yin and yang, that is "disorder" and "order", "activity" or "passivity", with yang usually preferred over yin. More specifically, the ling power of an entity resides in mediation between the two levels of order and disorder, activity and passivity, which govern social transformation. The mediating entity itself shifts of status and function between one level and another, and makes meaning in different contexts.

=== Liminality ===
Ling has been described as the ability to set up spatial and temporal boundaries, represent and identify metaphors, setting apart and linking together differences. The boundary is crossed by practices such as sacrifice and inspiration (shamanism). Spiritual mediumship makes the individual the center of actualising possibilities, acts and events indicative of the will of the gods. The association of ling with liminality implies the possibility of constructing various kinds of social times and history. In this way, the etho-political (ethnic) dimension is nurtured, regenerated by re-enactment, and constructed at first place, imagined and motivated in the process of forging a model of reality.

== Associations and symbolism ==
This attribute is often associated with goddesses, animal motifs such as the snake—an amphibian animal—, the owl which takes night for day, the bat being half bird and half mammal, the rooster who crows at the crack between night and morning, but also rivers dividing landmasses, and other "liminal" entities. There are yin gods and yang gods. Ling is a "cultural logic of symbolic relations", that mediates polarity in a dialectic governing reproduction and change.

== See also ==
- Chinese folk religion
- Vietnamese folk religion
- Yin and yang
- Wu
- Tongji
- Xian ling
