= 2016 Taoyuan bus fire =

Bus fire in Taoyuan, Taiwan

- 2016 Taoyuan bus fire (Taiwan) Location of Taoyuan
- Date: 19 July 2016
- Time: 12:57 (UTC+8)
- Location: Taoyuan, Taiwan; 25°02′33″N 121°13′15″E
- Outcome: All 26 people on board were killed
- Deaths: 26
- Property damage: Bus destroyed

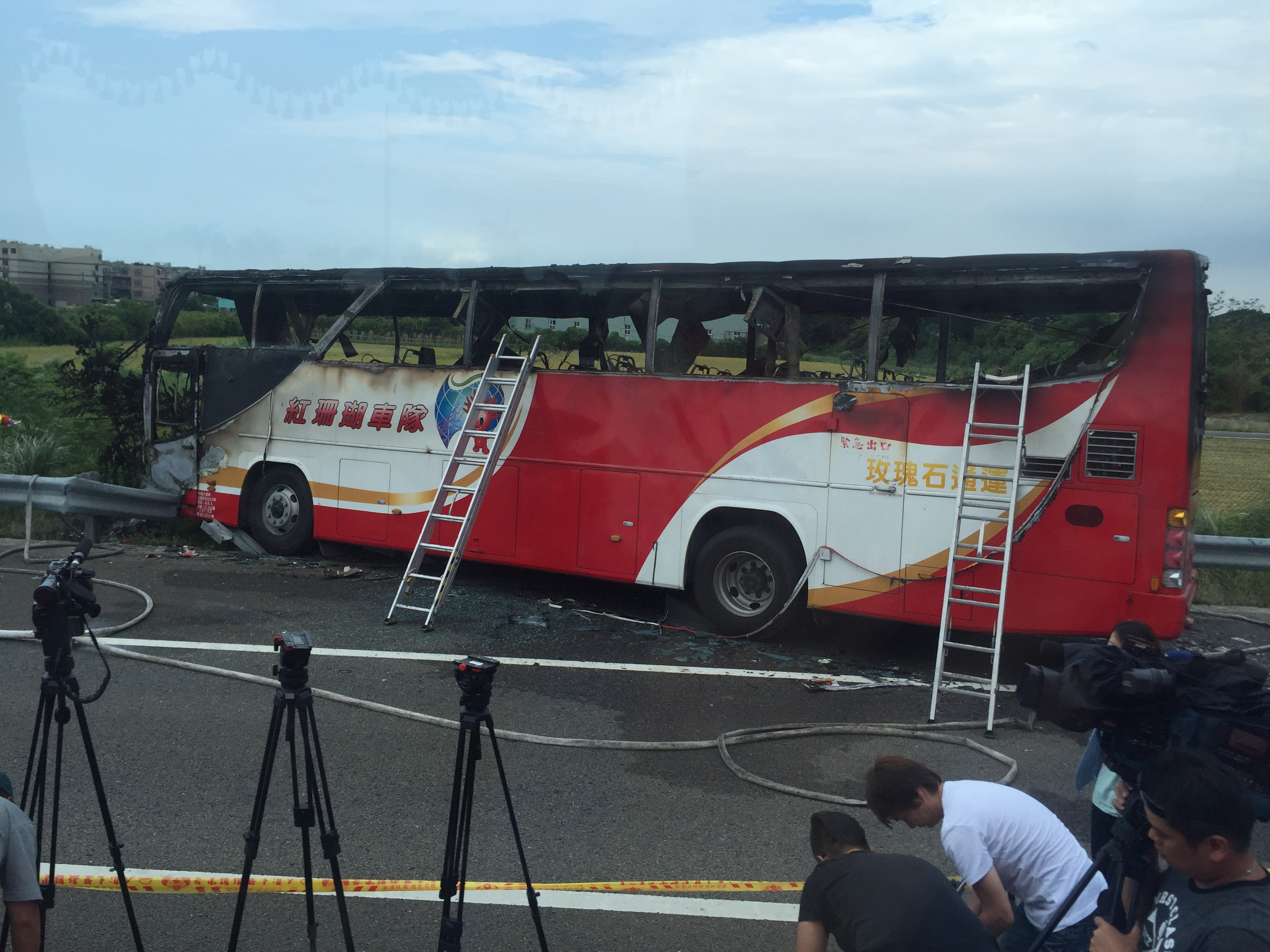
The bus carrying mainland Chinese tourists that caught fire in Taiwan in 2016

The 2016 Taoyuan bus fire occurred on the ROC National Road No. 2, in the 2nd Taoyuan City Great Park section. The bus that was involved was carrying Chinese tourists. At 12:57 on July 19, 2016, on State Road at the 2nd West Park section, a bus operated by Red Coral Bus Team, with the license plate number 197-EE, having driven to within 4.2 km of Taoyuan airport, suddenly caught on fire and started burning. The bus continued forwards for 2.9 km until it collided with a guardrail on the left side. After the driver swerved the bus to the right, it then collided with the right guardrail, after which tourists on the bus from Dalian walked to the back door to escape, but the door was jammed by the broken guardrail in the crash and could only open 10 cm wide, making escape impossible. Afterwards, a gravel truck driver saw the fire and quickly notified a policeman surnamed Lin. Together, they attempted a rescue by breaking the bus windows but were not successful, and eventually the entire bus was consumed by the blaze, causing all 26 passengers to die. This was the most serious bus accident in Taiwan that occurred in 2016, and also the most serious one since the 2010 Suhua Highway bus accident. BBC, The Guardian, the Wall Street Journal, NHK, Yomiuri Shimbun, CNN, the Daily Mirror, and various international media have made reports. An investigation by the Taoyuan District Prosecutor's Office found out that the bus driver had purposefully crashed after dousing the bus with gasoline and lighting it on fire.

== Details ==
During a tour at 12:57, the bus was passing through the State Road II, 4.2 km to the west of the Dayuan road section, and a fire appeared at the front of the vehicle. The bus swayed along the left inside lane of the road for quite some time, up to 2.8 or 2.9 kilometers. The bus then suddenly lost control, and the whole vehicle hit a guardrail on the left, then swerved to the right side, crashing into the rail there also. A policeman and a male civilian with hand-held extinguishers started trying to smash windows and rescue youths trapped in the burning vehicle. The fire was extinguished at 13:21, after about half an hour, but because heavy smoke quickly filled the confined space of the vehicle, everyone located inside the vehicle, including Su Mingcheng, the Taiwanese tour bus driver, tour guide Zheng Kun Wen, as well as 24 visitors of mainland Chinese citizenship, had no time to escape, and were killed on the spot either by burning, high temperature exposure, or suffocation on smoke and other toxic gases. Multiple burnt corpses were stacked together at the escape door located behind five seat rows. Despite there being eight escape doors, they all had a built-in lock that passengers did not know how to operate. Also, the rear bus door was jammed by the broken guardrail, and the thick obscuring smoke prevented the timely striking of the safety window's corners. The vehicle was burned, and the fire left only charred skeletons.

== Aftermath ==
=== Investigation ===
Initial investigations revealed that the escape door lock had a built-in lock, so you could not push open the door to escape. This is a major reason for fatal accidents in Taiwan. Investigator's initial impression of the cause of the fire was a wire from a short circuit and friction. Further the vehicles transformer voltage, originally 24 volts, had an unauthorized boost to 110 volts. The transformer powered the water dispenser, refrigerator, sockets, etc. Whether or not the fire was due to voltage instability caused by a short circuit was still to be investigated. There were also arguments that because of the tour company was a low-fare low-cost group, and relied on clients shopping to fill commission expenses and control costs, they could not afford to meet the safety standards.

On July 29, the driver remained in the Taoyuan District Prosecutors Office and test results showed that driver had before suspected of drunk driving. It could not be ruled out of the possibility of self-immolation. The possibility emerged of a murder-suicide by arson.

In addition, Su Mingcheng also broke the news on October 11, 2013, when guiding a group of mainland tourists. During the tour, in the Hualien City a sexual assault on a female occurred, and the Hualien District Court of First Instance sentenced him to 5 years in prison. He appealed and a second trial occurred on June 24, 2016.

September 10, the Taoyuan District Prosecutors Office concluded its investigation, and found Su Mingcheng guilty of premeditated arson and self-immolation. His family had long been aware of his want to commit suicide.

=== Initial responses ===
- Insurance Claims, Cremation, Settlements: The passengers and tour guide were insured in Taiwan and mainland China, and every deceased person was compensated with approximately NT$5.65 million, but the compensations were later raised to around NT$9.04 million per person. A total of 59 relatives of the mainland Chinese deceased went to Taiwan for one week to deal with the relevant cremations, compensation procedures, and settlements. Out of these 24 victim families, one family was determined to complete legal proceedings, with the rest deciding to sign a settlement agreement. On July 29, a public memorial was held in Dalian for some of the victims and their families from Northeastern China.
- Families of victims from mainland China were among the earliest parties to suspect that this was a case of deliberate murder or arson.

=== Passengers ===
Two crew were killed including a tour guide and the driver, who deliberately caused the incidents. The rest of the deceased were mainland Chinese tourists.

Deaths by nationality
Region	Number
Taiwan	2
Mainland China	24
Total	26

== See also ==
- List of traffic collisions (2010–present)
- 2016 in Taiwan
