= Yang Kuo-shu =

Chinese psychologist and political activist (1932–2018)

- 楊國樞
- Born: 22 December 1932; Jiao County, Shandong, Republic of China
- Died: 17 July 2018 (aged 85); National Taiwan University Hospital, Taipei, Taiwan
- Other name: Yang Guoshu
- Education: National Taiwan University (BA); University of Illinois (PhD)
- Occupations: Psychologist; political activist
- Organization: National Taiwan University
- Known for: Founder of indigenized Chinese psychology
- Notable work: Chinese Characteristics; Chinese Psychology and Behavior; Exploring Chinese Psychology Through Indigenous Research
- Spouse: Li Pen-hua (m. 1962–2018)
- Scientific career
- Fields: Social psychology
- Institutions: National Taiwan University
- Thesis: Cognitive dissonance and recall of interrupted and completed tasks (1969)

Chinese name
- Traditional Chinese: 楊國樞
- Simplified Chinese: 杨国枢
Transcriptions
Standard Mandarin
- Hanyu Pinyin: Yáng Guóshū
- Wade–Giles: Yang Kuo-shu
Southern Min
- Hokkien POJ: Iûⁿ Kok-chhu

Yang Kuo-shu (Chinese: 楊國樞; pinyin: Yáng Guóshū; 22 December 1932 – 17 July 2018) was a Taiwanese psychologist and political activist. He was a professor of psychology at National Taiwan University, where he was also the chair of its psychology department. He also the became the vice-president of Academic Sinica in 1996 and was elected as an academician in 1998. He was an advocate for political freedom and democracy during the Martial Law era, and was the founding president of the Taipei Society.

== Education and career ==
Yang was born on 22 December 1932 into a peasant family in Qingdao, Shandong, Republic of China, and moved to Taiwan with his parents in 1947. When he was little, a fortune-teller predicted that he would not become an educated person, and he was determined to prove the prediction wrong. After graduating from National Taiwan University (NTU) with a bachelor's degree in psychology, he became a faculty member at NTU in 1959.

Yang later went to study at the University of Illinois in the United States and earned his Ph.D. in 1969. He returned to teach at NTU afterwards and became the first person in Taiwan with a Ph.D. in psychology. He served twice as chair of NTU's psychology department, and became a research fellow at the Institute of Ethnology of Academia Sinica in 1972. He was appointed Vice President of Academia Sinica in 1996, and was elected an academician in 1998.

== Academic contributions ==
Yang is considered the founder of indigenized Chinese psychology. He proposed the distinction between indigenized versus westernized psychology. He argued that Western psychology, largely based on research done in American or Western societies, is in fact the "indigenous psychology for Americans or Westerners"—it is based on Western values and traditions and may not be applicable in non-Western countries. Beginning in the 1970s, he conducted research on Chinese cultural societies, studying unique phenomena such as yuanfen, filial piety, guanxi, and face. His theories and research tools have been adopted by scholars in Taiwan and abroad.

=== Publications ===
Yang wrote or edited more than 20 books. He also published more than 130 research papers, in both Chinese and English, in psychology journals. His most influential books, recognized as essential reference works in Chinese psychology, are:

- Chinese Characteristics (中國人的性格)
- Chinese Psychology and Behavior (中國人的心理與行為)
- Exploring Chinese Psychology Through Indigenous Research (華人心理的本土化研究)

== Political activism ==
During the Martial Law era, Yang was a strong advocate for political freedom and democracy and was frequently critical of the Kuomintang government. He and three other liberal scholars, Hu Fo, Li Hung-hsi, and Chang Chung-tung, were considered the "Four Bandits" or "Four Poisonous Weeds" by the government. After President Chiang Ching-kuo lifted the martial law in 1987, they established the political group Taipei Society (澄社, Chengshe) in 1989. Yang served as the founding president of the society, which aimed to promote "freedom, fairness, diversity, and the equitable distribution of wealth". He called for the restoration of constitutional rule and the exclusion of military personnel from the government cabinet. He participated in the Wild Lily student movement for democracy in 1990.

== Personal life ==
In 1962, Yang married Li Pen-hua (李本華), the daughter of Lieutenant General Li Li-po (李立柏).

After Yang suffered a stroke, President Tsai Ing-wen and Secretary-General Chen Chu visited him at the nursing home in May 2018. Yang died on 17 July 2018 at National Taiwan University Hospital, aged 85. Tsai praised him for his scholarship and for his courage to protest against government repression, calling him an "exemplary public intellectual".
