= Hu Fo =

Chinese political scientist, legal scholar and political activist

- Chinese: 胡佛
Transcriptions
Standard Mandarin
- Hanyu Pinyin: Hú Fó
- Wade–Giles: Hu Fo
- IPA: [xǔ fwǒ]
Southern Min
- Hokkien POJ: Hô͘ Pu̍t

Hu Fo or Hu Fu (Chinese: 胡佛; 14 May 1932 – 10 September 2018) was a Chinese political scientist, legal scholar, and political activist based in Taiwan. He was a prominent advocate for political freedom and democracy during the martial law era, but was also adamantly opposed to the Taiwan independence movement.

As a professor at National Taiwan University, Hu taught many prominent scholars and future politicians, including President Ma Ying-jeou, Vice President Annette Lu and Premier Jiang Yi-huah. Considered an authority in political science and constitutional law, he was elected a member of Academia Sinica in 1998.

== Biography ==
Hu was born on 14 May 1932 in Hangzhou, Zhejiang, Republic of China. He graduated from the Department of Law of National Taiwan University and obtained his master's degree in political science from Emory University in the United States.

After returning to Taiwan, he taught in the Department of Political Science at National Taiwan University, specializing in constitutional law, political culture and election. During the Martial Law era, Hu was a strong advocate for political freedom and democracy and was frequently critical of the Kuomintang (KMT) government. Hu and three other liberal scholars, Yang Kuo-shu, Li Hung-hsi, and Chang Chung-tung, were considered the "Four Bandits" or "Four Poisonous Weeds" by the government. After President Chiang Ching-kuo lifted the martial law in 1987, they founded the political group Taipei Society (澄社, Chengshe) in 1989.

Considered a pioneering authority of political science and constitutional law in Taiwan, Hu was elected as a member of Academia Sinica in 1998. Many of his students went on to become prominent politicians of both major parties of Taiwan, including President Ma Ying-jeou and Premier Jiang Yi-huah of the KMT, and Vice President Annette Lu of the Democratic Progressive Party (DPP). Many deans and professors of law and politics in Taiwanese universities were also his former students.

== Political views ==
Although a frequent opponent and critic of the KMT, Hu, unlike many other liberal scholars, was adamantly against the Taiwan independence movement espoused by the DPP. In his view, although conditions were not yet ripe, in the long run Chinese unification was inevitable, and it was the only way to maintain peace.

Hu argued that the political ideal of yitong, or a single unified state governing all regions, is deeply rooted in Chinese culture, and the abandonment of the ideal by many Taiwanese was a legacy of the Japanese colonial rule. He criticized those Taiwanese who deny their Chinese roots as "lacking morality", and believed that a "negotiated reunification" would eventually prevail.

== Death ==
In August 2018, Hu sustained head injuries from a fall. After being hospitalized in the National Taiwan University Hospital for about a month, he died on 10 September 2018, at the age of 86. He was survived by four daughters. He died less than two months after Yang Kuo-shu, his former colleague at the Taipei Society.
