= Yuanfen =

Concept in Chinese culture

Yuán (traditional Chinese: 緣; simplified Chinese: 缘; pinyin: yuán; Jyutping: jyun4; Pe̍h-ōe-jī: iân) or Yuanfen (traditional Chinese: 緣分; simplified Chinese: 缘分; pinyin: yuánfèn; Jyutping: jyun4fan6; Pe̍h-ōe-jī: iân-hūn), "fateful coincidence," is a concept in Chinese society describing good and bad chances and potential relationships. It can also be translated as "destiny, luck as conditioned by one's past", or "natural affinity among friends." It is comparable to the concept of karma in Buddhism, but yuánfèn is interactive rather than individual. The driving forces and causes behind yuánfèn are said to be actions done in previous incarnations.

Scholars Yang Kuo-shu and David Ho have analysed the psychological advantages of this belief: by assigning causality of negative events to yuánfèn beyond personal control, people tend to maintain good relationships, avoid conflict, and promote social harmony; likewise, when positive events are seen as a result of yuánfèn, personal credit is not directly assigned, which reduces pride on one side of the relationship and envy and resentment on the other.

== Role in society ==
Yang Kuo-shu and David Ho trace the origins of the term to traditional Buddhism and observe that yuan or yuánfèn are important concepts. Yang and Ho's research found that these concepts are still very much alive in Chinese social life and culture among university students. The concepts of yuan and yuánfèn and beliefs in predestination and fatalism have waned, and belief in yuan has waned as well, but continuity with past conceptions is still strong.

Marc Moscowitz, an anthropologist, finds that yuanfen appears frequently in contemporary popular music. Here yuánfèn refers to a "karmic relationship" with someone who was known in a previous life and is used to explain the end of a relationship that was not destined to work out.

== Popular usage ==
- The proverbial saying "have fate without destiny" (有緣無分) refers to couples who were fated to come together, but not destined to stay together, and as such is sometimes used as a break-up line.
- Upon meeting a person who is hard to find, one might aptly exclaim: "It is yuánfèn that has brought us together!"
- When one encounters another repeatedly in various locations such that it seems to be more than coincidence, one can refer to yuánfèn.
- As a counter-example, when two people know each other, e.g. as penpals, but never have the opportunity to meet face-to-face, it can be said that their yuánfèn is too superficial or thin (百世修来同船渡，千载修得共枕眠; 百世修來同船渡，千載修得共枕眠; bǎi shì xiū lái tóng chuán dù, qiān zǎi xiū dé gòng zhěn mián). Literally: It takes hundreds of rebirths to bring two persons to ride in the same boat; it takes a thousand eons to bring two persons to share the same pillow. This goes to show just how precious yuánfèn is.
- An alternative of this proverb is: 十年修得同船渡，百年修得共枕眠 (shí nián xiū dé tóng chuán dù, bǎi nián xiū dé gòng zhěn mián) which means literally: ten years of meditation (or good deeds) bring two people to cross a river in the same ferry, and a hundred years of meditation (or good deeds) bring two people to rest their heads on the same pillow. It conveys the same message.
- Although yuánfèn is often used in the context of lovers' relationships, the concept itself is much broader and can refer to any relationship between people under any circumstance. For example, yuánfèn can be thought of as the mechanism by which family members have been "placed" in each other's lives. On the other hand, even two strangers sitting next to each other on a short-haul plane ride are also thought to have a certain amount of yuánfèn. The line of reasoning follows roughly as such: out of the seven billion or so people living on this planet, the odds of two specific persons riding in an airplane together are astronomically small. Thus, two specific persons riding together on a plane have beaten out all odds to end up in those specific seats. If, in addition to their chance encounter, they happen to strike up an engaging conversation and find that they have common interests—perhaps in cinema, music, and/or photography—it makes their meeting all the more precious, and the depth of their yuanfen all the more noteworthy.

== Translations ==
"Affinity occasion" could be a good translation of yuánfèn, as yuánfèn depends on the probability, or chance, of meeting (or seeing) someone in the real world at any given time and place, and involves both persons feeling as if they have already known each other for a very long time, even though in reality, they have not.

The concept of "serendipity" is a good English approximation of yuánfèn in general situations not involving any elements of a romantic relationship. The French writer Émile Deschamps claims in his memoirs that in 1805, he was treated to some plum pudding by a stranger named Monsieur de Fontgibu. Ten years later, the writer encountered plum pudding on the menu of a Paris restaurant and wanted to order some, but the waiter told him that the last dish had already been served to another customer, who turned out to be de Fontgibu. Many years later, in 1832, Deschamps was at a dinner and once again ordered plum pudding. He recalled the earlier incident and told his friends that only de Fontgibu was missing to make the setting complete—and in the same instant, the now senile de Fontgibu entered the room.

Often yuánfèn is said to be the equivalent of "fate" (as in the title of a 1984 film, 緣分, given the Western name Behind the Yellow Line, also known as Fate, starring Leslie Cheung), or "destiny". "Fateful affinity" is the term used to describe yuánfèn by a leading character in Hao Jingfang's novel Jumpnauts in Ken Liu's 2024 translation. However, these words do not have the element of the past playing a role in deciding the outcome of the uncertain future. The most common Chinese term for "fate" or "destiny" is mìngyùn (命运; 命運; 'the turn of events in life').

"Providence" and "predestination" are not exact translations, because these words imply that things happen by the will of God or gods, whereas yuánfèn does not necessarily involve divine intervention.

== See also ==
- Chinese social relations
- Wu — the concept of awareness, consciousness, or spiritual enlightenment
- Bao ying — the concept of cosmic and moral reciprocity in Chinese folk religion
- Ming yun — the concept of destiny in Chinese folk religion
- Serendipity

== Sources ==
- Fan, Lizhu, and Chen Na (2013) The Revival of Indigenous Religion in China. Fudan University.
- Moskowitz, Marc L. (2010). Cries of Joy, Songs of Sorrow : Chinese Pop Music and Its Cultural Connotations. Honolulu: University of Hawai*i Press. ISBN 9780824833695.
- Yang, K.S.; Ho, David Y. F (1988). "The Role of Yuan in Chinese Social Life: A Conceptual and Empirical Analysis" (PDF). Asian Contributions to Psychology, Edited by Paranjpe, Ho & Rieber, New York: Praeger Publishers: 263–281..
- Deschamps, Émile (1873). Lemerre, Alphonse (ed.). "Œuvres complètes de Émile Deschamps : III : Prose : Première partie" [The Complete Works of Émile Deschamps] (in French). Paris: Alphonse Lemerre. pp. 262–265 – via Internet Archive. p. 265: "Trois fois du plum-pudding dans ma vie, et trois fois M. de Fontgibu! Pourquoi cela? – Une quatrième fois, et je suis capable de tout, ou je ne suis plus capable de rien."
- Hao Jingfang (2024) [2021]. Jumpnauts: A Novel. Translated by Liu, Ken. New York: Saga Press. p. 43. ISBN 9781534422117 – via Google Books. "Surely you know that what matters the most in relationships is yuanfen. It's that kind of fateful affinity that brings about unbreakable bonds."
