= Ng Bi-chu =

Taiwanese activist, musician and researcher

Juan Mei-shu or Ng Bi-chu (Chinese: 阮美姝; pinyin: Ruǎn Měishū; Pe̍h-ōe-jī: Ńg Bí-chu; 28 November 1928 – 28 November 2016) was a Taiwanese activist, musician, and researcher. Her father was a victim of the 228 Incident, an anti-government uprising that occurred in 1947 when she was eighteen. She spent much of her life studying the event and the subsequent White Terror period.

== Background ==
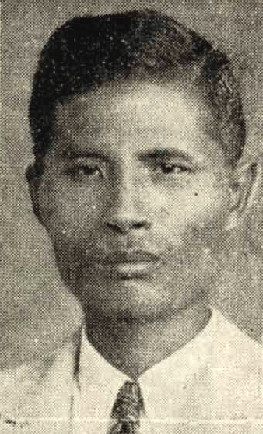
Ng's father Juan Chao-jih, c. 1937

Juan Chao-jih had begun a career in print media in 1932, and by 1947 was working for the government-owned Taiwan Shin Sheng Daily News. An editorial written in the paper shortly after 28 February 1947 attracted government attention and Juan was arrested on 12 March. This marked the last time Ng saw her father alive. The publication announced thirteen days later that Juan and editor Wu Chin-lien had been replaced. Ng went to study music in Japan, and did not know what had happened to her father until 1968, while reading Taiwan: A History of Agonies, in which Ong Iok-tek wrote that Juan had been killed.

== 228 Incident research ==
With filmmaker J.C. Hung, Ng produced six documentaries on the 228 Incident, and wrote two monographs based on her research, which ended officially in June 2006. Ng also collected documents and artifacts pertaining to the 228 Incident and made them available to the public as the Juan Mei-shu 228 Incident Memorial Archive. The documentary Searching for the Silent Mother of the 228 Incident -- Lin Chiang-mai was released in February 2007, and despite having been interviewed for it, Ng was critical of the film, accusing the film of misrepresenting events of the time. In May, Ng was caught up in another row over media portrayal of the 228 Incident, as she had lent SETTV footage of executions during the Chinese Civil War, which the station had misidentified as video of the 228 Incident and broadcast two months prior. Ng died at the age of 88 in 2016, of complications from diabetes.
