= Wu (awareness) =

Concept in Chinese folk religion

Wu (Chinese: 悟; pinyin: Wù) is a concept of awareness, consciousness, or spiritual enlightenment in the Chinese folk religion and Chinese Buddhism.

== Chinese Buddhism ==
The term originally appeared in Chinese Buddhism as a shortened form of juéwù (Chinese: 覺悟), a term seen in the 南本涅槃經 (a 36-volume translation of the Mahaparinibbana Sutta) and 六十華嚴經 (a 60-volume translation of the Buddhāvataṃsaka Sūtra). It is related to bodhi (Chinese: 覺; pinyin: jué), but usually describes a much earlier, initial insight. The equivalent term in Japanese Buddhism is satori.

A related term is "opening of awareness" kāiwù (Chinese: 開悟). Fan and Chen (2013), in their discussion of Chinese folk religion (see below), translate juéwù literally as "awakening of awareness".

== Chinese folk religion ==
According to scholarly studies, many practitioners who have recently "reverted" to the Chinese traditional religion use the term juéwù or kāiwù to describe their initial insight into the interconnectedness of reality in terms of the cosmic-moral harmony (bào yìng, Chinese: 報應) as it relates to mìng yùn and yuán fèn.

This spiritual awareness, wu, works as an engine that moves these themes from being mere ideas to be motivating forces in one's life:

- awareness of mìng yùn ignites responsibility towards life;
- awareness of yuán fèn stirs one to respond to events rather than resigning.

Awareness is a dynamic factor and appears in two guises: first, as a realisation that arrives as a gift, often unbidden, then as a practice that the person intentionally follows.

== See also ==
- Chinese folk religion
- Ming yun
- Bao ying
- Yuan fen
- Prajna

== Bibliography ==
- Fan, Lizhu; Chen, Na (2013). "The Revival of Indigenous Religion in China" (PDF). China Watch. Fudan University, Fudan-UC Center for China Studies. doi:10.1093/oxfordhb/9780195338522.013.024. Preprint from The Oxford Handbook of Religious Conversion, 2014.
