= Jack Tu =

Taiwanese-born Canadian cardiologist (1965–2018)

- Born: Jack Ven Tu; 1 March 1965; Taipei, Taiwan
- Died: 30 May 2018 (aged 53)
- Education: University of Western Ontario (BM); University of Toronto (MSc); Harvard University (PhD)
- Awards: Canada Research Chair
- Scientific career
- Fields: Cardiology
- Workplaces: Sunnybrook Health Sciences Centre; University of Toronto; ICES
- Thesis: Quality of Cardiac Surgical Care in Ontario, Canada (1996)

Jack Ven Tu (1 March 1965 – 30 May 2018) was a Taiwanese-Canadian cardiologist.

== Early life and career ==
Tu was born in Taipei, Taiwan to Jun-bi and Beth. His father was a psychiatrist who took on a position at Queen's University at Kingston upon the family's immigration to Canada when Tu was two. He showed an early interest in the medical sciences and competed in regional and national science fairs as a student.

Tu finished high school in four years instead of five, was accepted to medical school after just one year of undergraduate studies and graduated as the youngest of his medical school class in 1988 at the age of 23. He received his medical degree from the University of Western Ontario and completed his residency in internal medicine at the Toronto General Hospital. He then earned a Master of Science (MSc) from the University of Toronto and pursued doctoral studies at Harvard University.

His doctoral dissertation, completed at Harvard University, was titled Quality of Cardiac Surgical Care in Ontario, Canada. Upon earning his Ph.D. in 1996, Tu began working for Sunnybrook Health Sciences Centre while teaching at the University of Toronto. He was later named a Tier 1 Canada Research Chair in Health Services Research at the University of Toronto and made a fellow of the Canadian Academy of Health Sciences.

== Death ==
Tu died at the age of 53 on 30 May 2018.
