= Wang You-theng =

Taiwanese entrepreneur

Wang You-theng (Chinese: 王又曾; pinyin: Wáng Yòucéng; 5 March 1927 – 27 May 2016) was a Taiwanese entrepreneur, born in Changsha, Hunan, Republic of China, who founded the China Rebar Group and served as its chairman until fleeing Taiwan in late 2006 amid allegations of embezzlement and fraud.

== Business career ==
Wang established the China Rebar Group in 1959 as a manufacturer of steel reinforcement beams. In the following years, Rebar expanded its operations from the construction industry into textiles, hotels, real estate, retail services, insurance, banking, and telecommunications. As the head of a growing business empire, Wang enjoyed a large personal fortune and increasing political clout. Several of Wang's children and relatives served as high-ranking officers in Rebar's subsidiary companies. As a tycoon, Wang maintained a close business relationship with government authorities over several administrations, serving as a member of the Central Standing Committee of the Kuomintang for 15 years and being appointed as a National Policy Advisor to President Chen Shui-bian in 2000 when the Democratic Progressive Party won the ROC Presidential election that year.

== Rebar scandal and flight ==
By 2006, Rebar was encountering serious difficulties following years of allegedly hiding financial problems with bad loans from The Chinese Bank (a subsidiary) and falsified accounting records. On 29 December 2006, Rebar Asia-Pacific Group, along with three subsidiaries filed for bankruptcy protection, but did not notify the Taiwan Stock Exchange of their insolvency claims as required by regulations until 4 January 2007. During this week, several high-ranking officers in Rebar, including Wang, were alleged to have engaged in insider trading and embezzlement. Wang and his wife fled Taiwan for Hong Kong on 30 December, days before prosecutors began to launch an investigation into allegations of Rebar financial impropriety.

In the weeks following the break of the scandal, Wang and his wife moved to Shanghai. Public opinion in Taiwan was inflamed by reports of Wang's extravagant tastes and high living, as well as news that he had engaged in money laundering and discreetly transferred several assets abroad in prior years, suggesting that he had been planning his escape for some time. Despite several official attempts through the ROC's Mainland Affairs Council and other unofficial attempts, efforts to have the People's Republic of China return Wang back to Taiwan proved unsuccessful.

On 13 January, Wang and his wife left the PRC for the United States arriving at Los Angeles with Wang using his ROC passport with a B1 visa, and his wife entering using her US passport. Two days later, the Taipei Prosecutor's Office declared Wang a wanted fugitive, and his ROC passport was revoked by the Ministry of Foreign Affairs (MOFA). MOFA also contacted the US Department of Justice (DOJ) requesting assistance in having Wang extradited back to Taiwan. However, this proved to be difficult as the ROC's diplomatic isolation meant that it had few standing extradition agreements with other states, though US authorities did have an information sharing system in place which was used to coordinate efforts between the two sides.

On 31 January, the DOJ contacted Taipei Economic and Cultural Representative Office (TECRO) representatives in the US with information that Wang and his wife had left Los Angeles aboard Singapore Airlines Flight 27, with tickets for Myanmar with a stopover in Singapore. Wang was reportedly becoming nervous as US authorities were beginning to probe possible illegal transactions at the Rebar subsidiary OmniBank, based in the US. At this point, Wang was traveling on a Dominican passport, his ROC passport having been revoked in mid-January. Officials in Taipei immediately contacted Dominica and had Wang's Dominican passport revoked, effectively rendering him stateless. MOFA officials also contacted the Singapore government, requesting that Wang be extradited back to Taiwan, though again, the ROC and Singapore had no standing extradition agreement. Several agents from the Ministry of Justice Bureau of Investigation (BOI) were also dispatched to Singapore to intercept him at Singapore Changi Airport.

Arriving at Changi Airport the morning of 2 February, the couple were met at the gate by armed guards and denied entrance to Singapore. Singapore authorities and the BOI agents attempted to persuade the couple to board a Taiwan-bound flight. The couple refused and according to media reports, began sobbing and squatting on the floor, refusing to move. Due to the lack of an extradition agreement, neither the BOI agents or Singapore police were able to make an arrest. Attempts were made to place Wang on Singapore Airlines Flight 872, a return flight to the US with a transit at Taiwan Taoyuan International Airport, where he would be able to be detained upon entrance into the airport terminal. However upon learning of this, Wang and his wife still refused to board and as a result, delayed that flight for over three hours. After several more hours of screaming, crying, and yelling, the couple were permitted to return to the US via a direct flight.

Upon arriving back at Los Angeles International Airport, Wang was detained by U.S. Immigration and Customs Enforcement for attempting to enter the US without valid documentation, and was placed in the San Pedro Service Processing Center. You-theng was detained in the U.S. and wanted by Taiwanese prosecutors for allegedly embezzling NT$60 billion (US$1.8 billion) in corporate funds.

Wang reportedly died in an automobile accident in West Covina, California on 27 May 2016. His body has been cremated by family members and his ashes flown back to Taiwan.

== Children ==
Wang had four wives, six sons, and two daughters.

- With his first wife
  - Wang Lin-tai (王令台)
  - Wang Lin-fu (王令甫)
- With his second wife Chen Pei-fang (陳佩芳)
  - Wang Lin-i (王令一)
  - Gary Wang (王令麟)
- With his third wife
  - Wang Lin-mei (王令楣)
  - Wang Lin-ke (王令可)
- With his fourth wife Chin Shyh-ying (金世英)
  - Wang Lin-chiao (王令僑)
  - Wang Lin-hsing (王令興)
