= Andrew Oung =

Taiwanese businessman (1950–2015)

- 翁大銘

Member of the Legislative Yuan
- In office 1 February 1993 – 31 January 1996
- Constituency: Taipei 2

Personal details
- Born: 4 June 1950 Cixi, Ningbo, Zhejiang, China
- Died: 6 March 2015 (aged 64) Da'an District, Taipei, Taiwan
- Party: Independent
- Relations: Oung Min-chang (father); Oung Yi-ming and James Oung (brothers); Oung Shi-hua (son)

Andrew Oung
- Traditional Chinese: 翁大銘
- Simplified Chinese: 翁大铭
Transcriptions
Standard Mandarin
- Hanyu Pinyin: Wēng Dàmíng
- Bopomofo: ㄨㄥㄉㄚˋㄇㄧㄥˊ
Southern Min
- Hokkien POJ: Ang Tōabêng

Andrew Oung (4 June 1950 – 6 March 2015) also known by his Chinese name Oung Ta-ming, was a Taiwanese businessman whose family ran the Hualon Textile Corporation. Oung served in the Legislative Yuan from 1993 to 1996.

== Career ==
Oung's father founded Hualon Textile in 1967. At the height of his business career, Andrew Oung was responsible for nearly a third of all trading on the Taiwan Stock Exchange. In 1992, Oung was jailed in an insider trading and price manipulation scandal, in part because the $22 million Hualon planned on investing in the stock market were never paid. Oung was one of 38 people charged in the scandal. He sought a seat in the Legislative Yuan later that year, hoping to secure political immunity and won as an independent. However, the debts continued growing. When Oung declared bankruptcy in 1994, he owed various creditors over $152 million. He was again sent to prison in 2010 for fraud leading to the bankruptcy proceedings. Oung served over half of a two-year sentence before being paroled in 2011. The next year, former employees at Hualon's Toufen factory organized protests, alleging that they were owed $22 million in lost wages and pensions due to Hualon's bankruptcy.

In 2014, James and Andrew's acquisition of Paladin was challenged by their nephew, the former CEO of Paladin.

Andrew Oung died in of a heart attack in 2015, at his home in Taipei.
