= Kaohsiung Prison riot =

2015 riot and hostage situation in Kaohisung Prison, Taiwan

Coordinates: 22.5896°N 120.3982°E

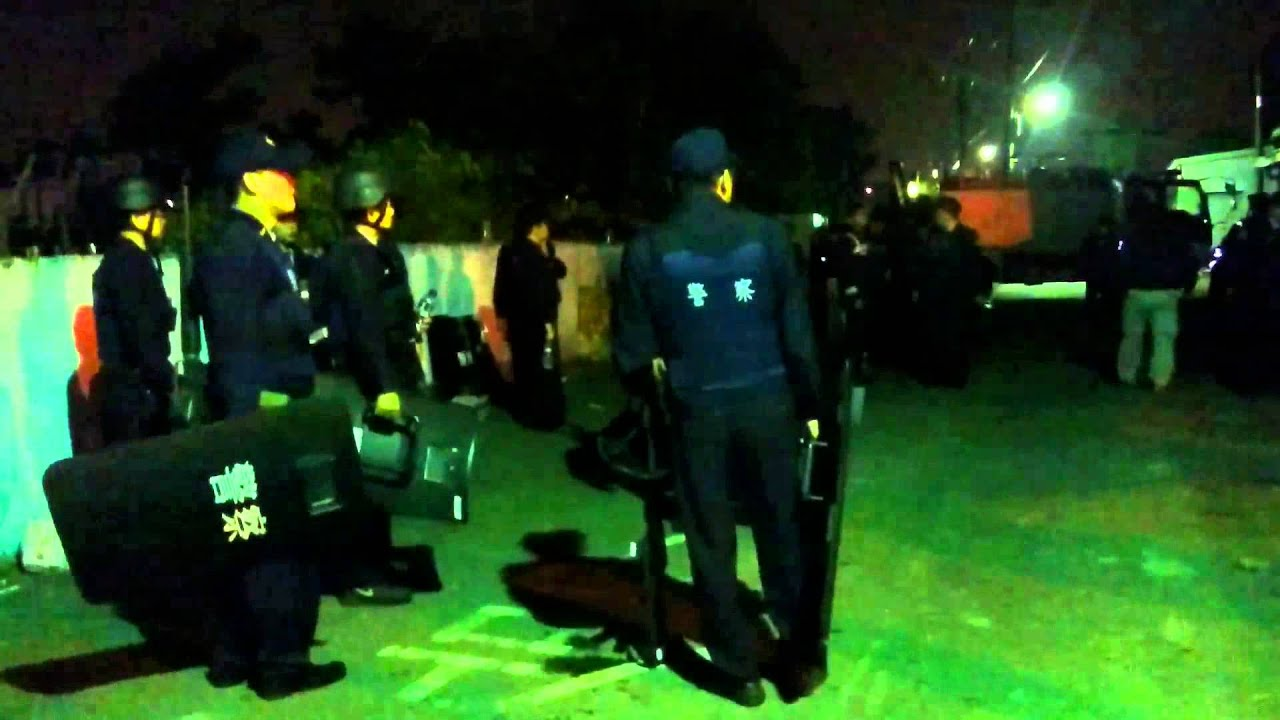
- Riot police on stand by outside of Kaohsiung Prison
- Time: First two guards taken: 11 February 2015, 4:30 p.m. (UTC+8); Head warden released: 12 February 2015, 5:00 a.m. (UTC+8)
- Location: Kaohsiung, Taiwan
- Motive: Protest of Chen Shui-bian's medical parole

The Kaohsiung Prison riot was a hostage situation that occurred at Kaohsiung Prison in Taiwan starting 11 February 2015. Six inmates, whose ringleader was a member of Bamboo Union, seized weapons, including assault rifles, and took the warden hostage for a 14-hour high-profile stand-off, which caught media attention nationwide. The group of inmates eventually committed mass suicide. The inmates protested that the former President of the Republic of China Chen Shui-bian, who was jailed for 20 years for money laundering, was granted medical parole due to his status as a political prisoner while other prisoners were denied. This is the first ever prison riot with officials held hostage in the history of Taiwan.

== Aftermath ==
A subsequent investigation found that the head prison warden was unaware of the hostage crisis for 30 minutes after it began. On 26 February 2015, the Ministry of Justice announced that 23 prison officials had been reprimanded for their handling of the incident. The head warden was demoted and given a demerit. Demerits were also served to two of his top aides, and to the head of the Agency of Corrections.

By August 2016, the head warden, deputy warden and head guard were no longer in their respective positions and had been impeached by the Control Yuan.

== Popular culture ==
Taiwanese media compared this riot to the 1988 Seoul prison jailbreak in which Ji Kang-hun escaped to protest the seven-year sentence of Chun Kyeong-hwan, the brother of South Korean president Chun Doo-hwan, who was convicted of embezzlement and tax evasion. Ji thought it unfair that he received a longer sentence for stealing a smaller amount of money. The Korean movie The Holiday starring Lee Sung-jae was based on this incident.
