= 2015 New Taipei water park fire =

Dust fire in Taiwan

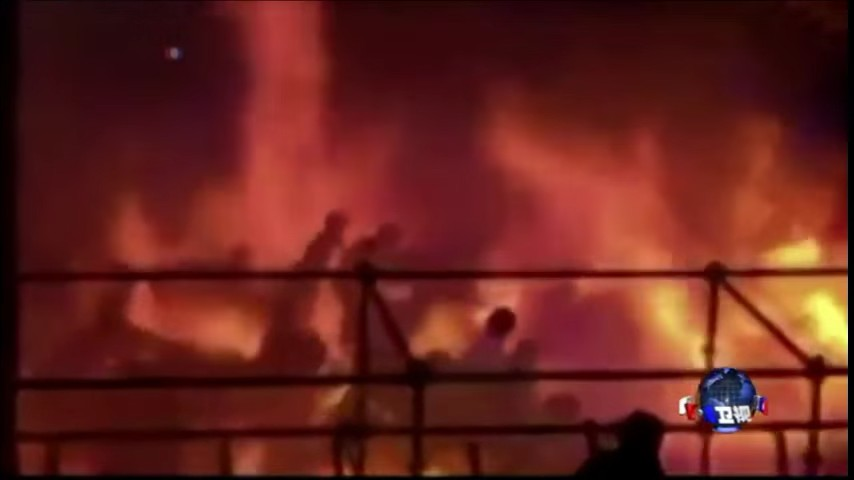
- A video screenshot of the fire, from Voice of America
- Native name: 八仙樂園彩色派對火災
- Date: 27 June 2015
- Time: 20:32 (UTC+8)
- Venue: A drained swimming pool at Formosa Fun Coast
- Location: Bali, New Taipei City, Taiwan; 25°08′44″N 121°23′15″E
- Type: Dust fire
- Deaths: 17 (including two people who later died by suicide related to the case)
- Injuries: 497

On 27 June 2015, a dust fire occurred at Formosa Fun Coast, a water park in Bali, New Taipei City, Taiwan. Staff of an outdoor "color powder party" sprayed participants with clouds of corn starch, which ignited. The fire lasted 40 seconds and burned 508 people, killing 15 and leaving 199 in critical condition.

Initially, only patches of airborne corn starch caught fire and were extinguished almost instantly, but due to the spraying of carbon-dioxide fire extinguishers by staff towards the participants, along with the running of the participants, the airborne corn starch dispersed into multiple dust clouds which was responsible for most of the burning.

== Background ==
2015 New Taipei water park fire (Taiwan)

The Color Run is a paint race event that had been held in various countries since 2011. In August 2013, a similar event called "Color Me Rad 5K" was held in Taipei.

During an interview for a news session, a physics teacher warned that the colored powder used in such events might cause a dust explosion if the material was combustible.

In September 2013, the first Taiwanese color party took place in Sizihwan, Kaohsiung City. It was organized by events company Color Play, this company later held the "Color Play Asia" party in 2015.

== Event ==
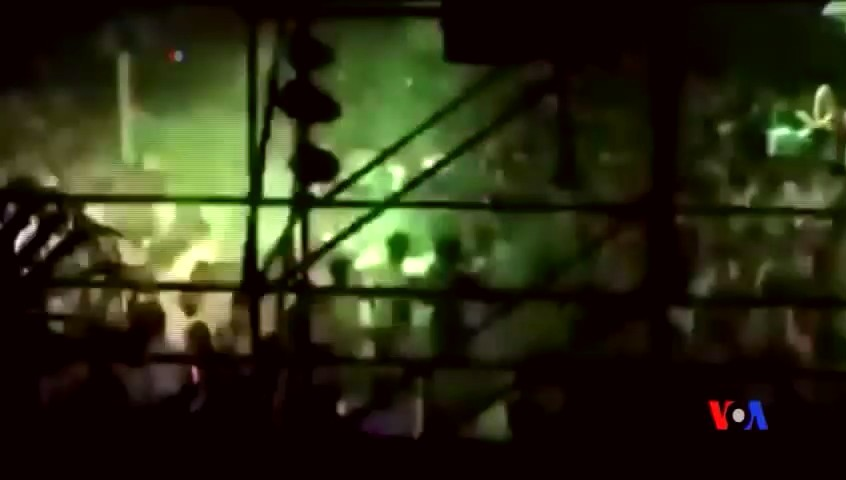
Moments before fire, from Voice of America

On 27 June 2015, the "Color Play Asia" party was held at the Formosa Fun Coast water park. Partygoers were singing and dancing on the stage, which holds up to 1,000. Other partygoers danced in a drained swimming pool nearby.

The concert organizers deployed colored corn starch powder in the festivities. The method of powder application at the concert created "an extremely dense dust cloud over the stage and its immediate vicinity", people near the stage were standing "almost ankle-deep" in colored corn starch powder, and the powder was repeatedly suspended into the air using air blowers as well as compressed gas canisters.

At about 20:30, a large deflagration occurred when a cloud of colored powder caught fire after being fired from the stage onto a crowd of 1,000 people during a concert. The powder caught fire due to heat from lights on the stage. Some of the crowd breathed in the powder, causing respiratory problems. As recorded in an amateur video by an audience member, a massive fireball suddenly engulfed the stage. The powder caught fire along the ground, resulting in burns mainly to victims' limbs and torsos. According to the authorities, the fire was quickly extinguished. The rescue included help from army vehicles and soldiers, along with medical services. Many people were taken to hospitals via taxis due to the lack of ambulances in the area.

== Injuries and fatalities ==
| Origin | Number of injuries | Number of deaths |
|---|---|---|
| Taiwan | 478 | 15 |
| Hong Kong | 6 | |
| China | 2 | |
| Japan | 2 | |
| Malaysia | 2 | |
| Macau | 1 | |
| Singapore | 1 | |
| South Africa | 1 | |
| United Kingdom | 1 | |
| United States | 1 | |
| Total | 496 | 15 |

The injured were treated in over 50 hospitals across Taiwan. As of 29 November 2015, 15 of the 497 injured had died, 44 victims remained hospitalized, and 11 were being treated at intensive care wards, while fifty-seven others were discharged from hospitals after treatment. Most of the injured were tertiary students in their twenties and late teens who had just started their summer vacation. An earlier estimate of 519 injured was due to double-counting of patients that were transferred between hospitals.

Many victims were lightly clothed because of hot weather (36.6 °C (97.9 °F)) and the water park venue, and suffered burns over large portions of their bodies. Some victims suffered burns to 80–90% of their skin.

Four foreigners injured in the event were flown home via International SOS flights for follow-up medical treatment on 29 June: two to Hong Kong (Queen Mary Hospital and Prince of Wales Hospital), one to Shanghai (Ruijin Hospital) and one to Singapore (Singapore General Hospital).

Two suicides were linked to the event: a father of a surviving burn victim committed suicide by hanging, while another man, who also killed himself by hanging, wanted to donate his skin to the victims.

== Response ==
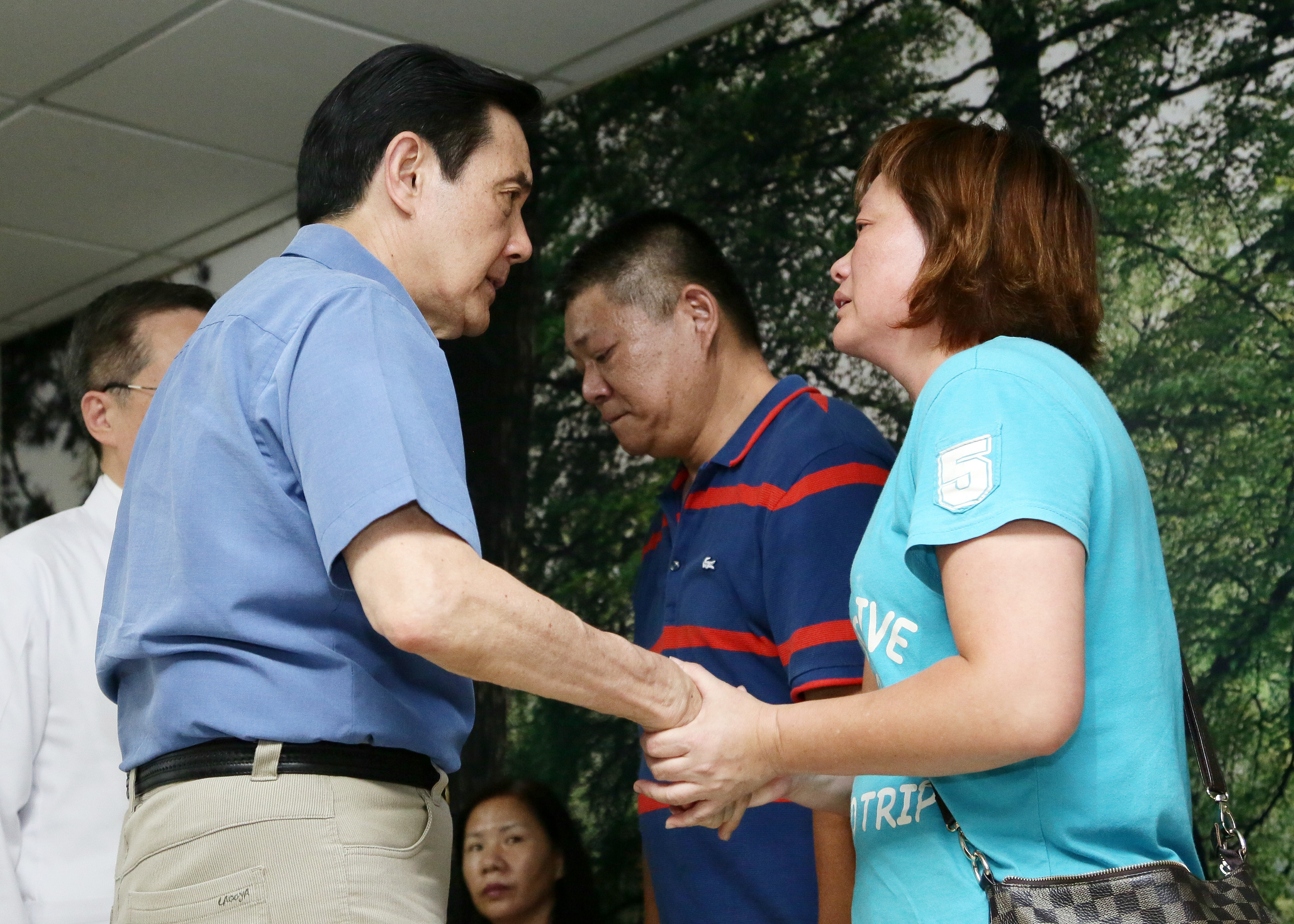
President of Taiwan Ma Ying-jeou meeting with family members of the victims

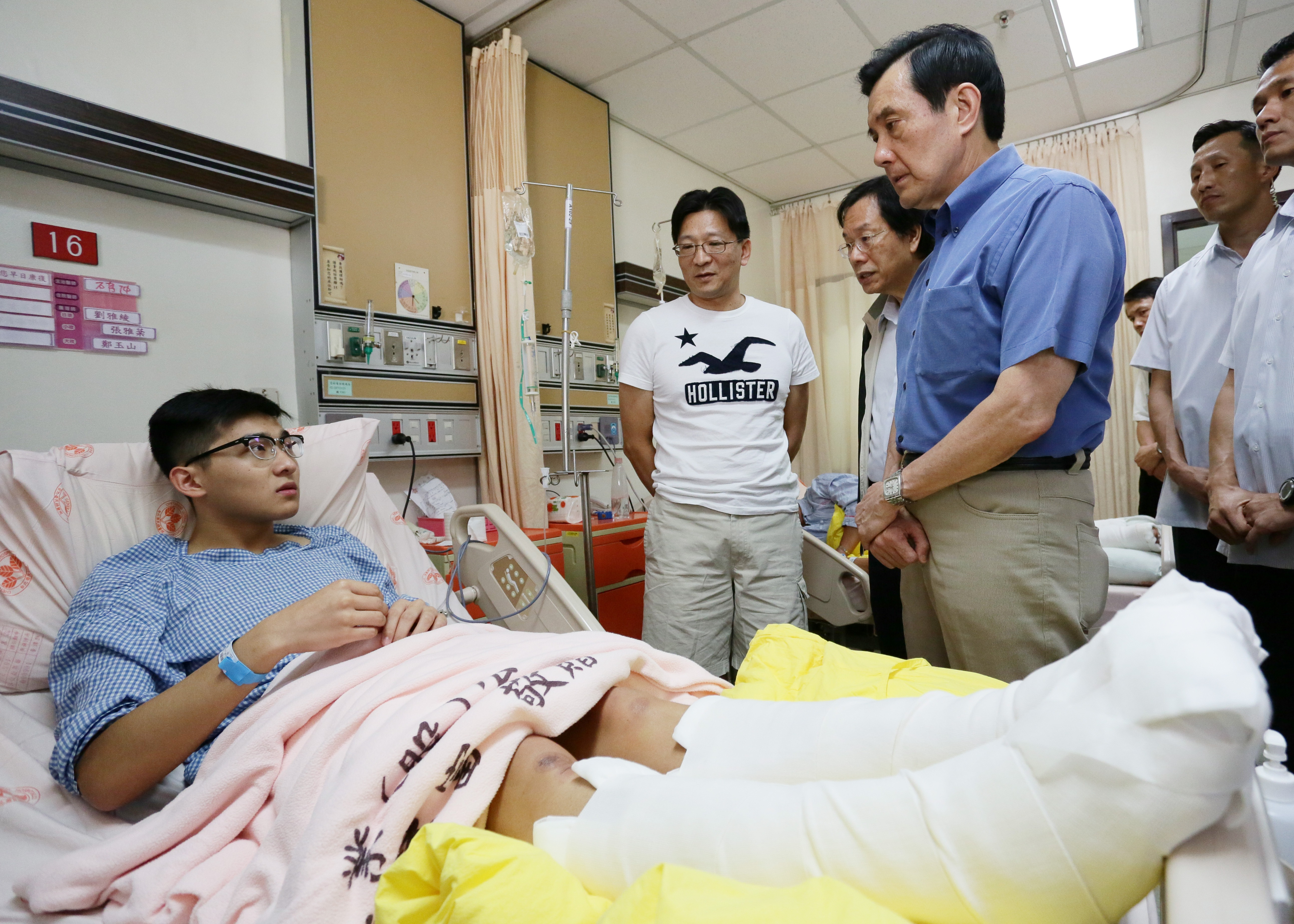
Ma Ying-jeou visiting a hospitalized victim

New Taipei City's mayor Eric Chu ordered an immediate shutdown of the water park pending an investigation. The man responsible for the event was detained by police for investigation. On 28 June, Taiwan Premier Mao Chi-kuo banned the use of colored powders at private events until the investigation concluded and the powder can be considered safe.

The event's organizer and hardware engineer were questioned and then given bail on the condition that they not leave the country. Lu Chung-chi apologized for the explosion on 28 June. On 28 June a spokesman for China's Taiwan Affairs Office, Ma Xiaoguang, expressed sympathy for the victims and hoped they all received timely and appropriate treatment.

On 30 June Taiwan's Organ Registry and Sharing Center called for urgent donations of cadaver skin, since there were just 115 rolls left in the country's cadaver skin stocks. According to Chairman Lee Po-chang (李伯璋; Lǐ Bózhāng), cadaver skin is more effective in blocking burn wounds from contamination sources and promoting skin regeneration than hog skin or synthetic skin.

According to officials, the Ministry of Health and Welfare collaborated with the New Taipei City Public Health Department and made an announcement that all medical expenses of the burn patients from 27 June to 30 September will be covered by the National Health Insurance Administration and the National Health Insurance Program.

On 2 July, a spokesman for China's Taiwan Affairs Office said it was ready to provide medical assistance to help treat the hundreds of people injured in the explosion. On 3 July, Taiwanese Minister of Health and Welfare Chiang Been-huang said he was grateful for China's offer to provide medical assistance, including donations of cadaver skin to Taiwan, but it should be first confirmed that the skin was not from executed prisoners.

Cadaver skin from the United States and Netherlands was sent to Taiwan.

== Investigation ==
Investigators raised the question of whether the powder was ignited by a cigarette or spark. Organizers had purchased three tons of the powder, and wrote on their Facebook page that it consisted of cornstarch and food coloring. The powder was sprayed from the stage onto concert-goers "at high velocity". The vice president of Tai Won Food Industrial Co, which makes the powder, says that there are warnings on the packages not to use them in closed spaces or under high temperatures because it can catch fire. The New Taipei City news department head stated, "It's still not clear what happened, but there were a number of people smoking and the weather was warm."

The Fire Department's preliminary conclusion was that the fire was caused by the sprayed powder, and that stage lights may have been the source of ignition.

WuFeng University fire science department instructor and Taichung Harbor Fire Department deputy captain Lu Shou-chien commented in a letter to the Chinese-language United Daily News that the event organizers had set up necessary conditions for a disaster, and had not used water sprays which would have reduced the risk of ignition. Smoking was permitted at the event, and approximately 40 cigarette butts were found afterwards.

In October 2015, the committee set up by the New Taipei City government to oversee monetary donations related to the explosion announced plans to distribute the collected funds. Survivors were to receive between NT$65,000 and NT$6,500,000, depending on the severity of injuries sustained in the dust explosion. The families of the people who had died were compensated NT$8,250,000.

On 16 October 2015, Shilin District prosecutors charged the event organizer, Lu Chung-chi, with negligence during the disaster; owners of the park were not indicted. Lu was found guilty of the charges in April 2016. In 2018, Lu was sentenced to five years in prison. In June 2016, the Supreme Court authorized the seizure of NT$507,000,000 in assets from the park's senior administration. The National Health Insurance Administration also sought compensation worth NT$436,000,000 from event organizers in court, claiming that the medical cost incurred by the NHIA totaled NT$765,000,000. Families of the injured sued the New Taipei City Government, the National Fire Agency, and Tourism Bureau for compensation. An appeal heard by the High Court in 2025 ordered the New Taipei municipal government and the Tourism Bureau's succeeding body the Tourism Administration to pay NT$21 million total in compensation. The court ruled that the National Fire Agency was not responsible. The High Court decision was upheld by the Supreme Court in 2026.

The Shilin District ruled on the first class action lawsuit related to the fire in 2023, finding that Lu Chung-chi and his two companies were liable for NT$405.88 million in total damages, split between NT$310.96 million in compensatory damages and NT$47.46 million of punitive damages for each of Lu's two companies. Upon appeal in 2026 the High Court ruled that the park's operator, Formosa Wonderworld Company, should share liability with the party's organizers. The high court decision increased Lu's and his companies' share of the damages to NT$351.28 million and Formosa Wonderwold's share to NT$136.49 million.

== Aftermath ==
After the fire, the government has adopted several emergency-related measures, such as the easing of the requirements for National Health Insurance coverage for burn victims, and importing large amounts of artificial and cadaver skin. An exhibition was held from 25–29 June 2025 to mark the tenth anniversary of the fire.
