= Bao ying =

Chinese folk-religion concept

Bàoyìng (Chinese: 報應) is a concept of cosmic and moral reciprocity in the Chinese folk religion. It implies that people dwell in a moral universe, a universe that is kept ordained by mores, good actions, thus moral retribution is in fact a cosmic retribution. It determines fate, as written in the Book of Documents: "on the doer of good, heaven sends down all blessings, and on the doer of evil, he sends down all calamities." (書經•湯誥)

In Buddhism and Daoism, bàoyìng is equated to the concept of dharmic retribution.

The cosmic significance of bào yìng is better understood exploring other two traditional concepts of fate and meaning:

- Mìngyùn (命運), the personal destiny, in which mìng (命) is "life" or "right", the given status of life, and yùn (運) defines "circumstance" and "individual choice"; mìng is given and influenced by the transcendent force Tiān (天), that is the same as the "divine right" (天命; tiānmìng) of ancient rulers as identified by Mencius. Personal destiny (mìng yùn) is thus perceived as both fixed (the status of life) and flexible, open-ended (the individual choice in matters of bào yìng).
- Yuánfèn (緣分), "fateful coincidence", describing good and bad chances and potential relationships. Scholars K. S. Yang and D. Ho have analysed the psychological advantages of this belief: assigning causality of negative events to yuánfèn beyond personal control, people tend to maintain good relationships, avoid conflict, and promote social harmony; meanwhile, when positive events are seen as result of yuánfèn, personal credit is not directly assigned, and this reduces pride on one side of the relationship and envy and resentment on the other.

Mìngyun and yuánfèn are linked, because what appears on the surface to be chance events (for better or worse), are part of the deeper rhythm that shapes personal life based on how destiny is directed. They are ultimately shaped by bào yìng, good action. Recognising this connection has the result of making a person responsible for his or her actions: doing good for others produces further good for oneself and keeps the world in harmony.

== See also ==
- Chinese folk religion
- Wu
- Yuanfen
- Ganying
- Karma

== Sources ==
- Fan Lizhu, Chen Na. The Revival of Indigenous Religion in China. Fudan University, 2013.
