= Zeng Shiqiang =

Chinese-born Taiwanese sinologist

- 曾仕強
- Born: 28 August 1934; Zhangzhou, Fujian, China
- Died: 11 November 2018 (aged 84); Zhongzheng District, Taipei, Taiwan, Republic of China
- Education: National Taiwan Normal University; University of Leicester; Truman State University
- Occupations: Sinologist, scholar, writer
- Years active: 1992–2018
- Spouse: Liu Junzheng

Chinese name
- Traditional Chinese: 曾仕強
- Simplified Chinese: 曾仕强
Transcriptions
Standard Mandarin
- Hanyu Pinyin: Zēng Shìqiáng

Zeng Shiqiang (28 August 1934 – 11 November 2018) was a Chinese sinologist best known for studying I Ching, the oldest of the Chinese classics. Zeng is acclaimed as having been the "Father of the Chinese Style of Management". He served as president of Hsing Kuo University of Management (HKU) and professor at National Chiao Tung University (NCTU).

== Biography ==
Zeng was born in Zhangzhou, Fujian on 28 August 1934. After the defeat of the Nationalists by the Communists in Chinese Civil War in 1949, his family moved to Tainan County, Taiwan. After high school, Zeng was accepted to the National Taiwan Normal University, where he majored in the Department of Industrial Education. After graduation, he taught there. He received his doctor's degree and master's degree from the University of Leicester and the Truman State University, respectively.

Zeng died at Tri-Service General Hospital in Taipei on 11 November 2018, aged 84.

== Works ==
- The Characteristics of Chinese Culture. Shaanxi Normal University General Publishing House Co.Ltd. 2011. ISBN 9787561352830.
- Insight into the Mysteries of the I Ching: Book of Management Wisdom. Peking University Press. 1991. ISBN 9787301080870.
- 易经的智慧合集 [Wisdom of I Ching] (in Chinese). Democracy and Construction Publishing House. 2016. ISBN 9787513910699.
- 易经的奥秘 [Mysteries of the I Ching] (in Chinese). Beijing Time Chinese Bookstore. 2017. ISBN 9787569915150.
- 曾仕强详解道德经：德经 (in Chinese). Democracy and Construction Publishing House. 2016. ISBN 9787513911214.
- 曾仕强评胡雪岩 (in Chinese). Shaanxi Normal University Press. 2012. ISBN 9787561363096.
- 人际的奥秘--曾仕强告诉你如何搞好人际关系 (in Chinese). Beijing United Publishing Company. 2015. ISBN 9787550237872.
- 曾仕强点评三国之道：论三国智慧 (in Chinese). Shaanxi Normal University Press. 2010. ISBN 9787561353899.
- 情绪的奥秘 (in Chinese). Beijing United Publishing Company. 2014. ISBN 9787550233393.
- 曾国藩的启示 (in Chinese). Beijing United Publishing Company. 2014. ISBN 9787550223714.
- 为政之道 (in Chinese). Taiwan Publishing House. 2016. ISBN 9787516810859.
- 大道至简 (in Chinese). Guangdong Economic Publishing House Co., Ltd. 2018. ISBN 9787545461053.
- 曾仕强教授告诉你怎样带团队 (in Chinese). Beijing United Publishing Company. 2017. ISBN 9787550293557.
- 中国式思维 (in Chinese). Beijing United Publishing Company. 2017. ISBN 9787550289086.
- 中国式管理 (in Chinese). Beijing United Publishing Company. 2015. ISBN 9787550254411.
- 孝经：中国式家庭关系 (in Chinese). Guangdong Economic Publishing House Co., Ltd. 2018. ISBN 9787545460605.
- Yuan tong de ren ji guan xi 圆通的人际关系 (in Chinese). Peking University Press. 2008. ISBN 9787301134061.
- 老子的人生智慧 (in Chinese). Guangdong Economic Publishing House Co., Ltd. 2016. ISBN 9787545445398.
- 坤道：中国女人的修养 (in Chinese). Guangdong Economic Publishing House Co., Ltd. 2018. ISBN 9787545460247.

== Personal life ==
Zeng married Liu Junzheng (simplified Chinese: 刘君政; traditional Chinese: 劉君政), who is also a professor.
