= Liu Wan-lai =

Japanese–Chinese translator (1929–2016)

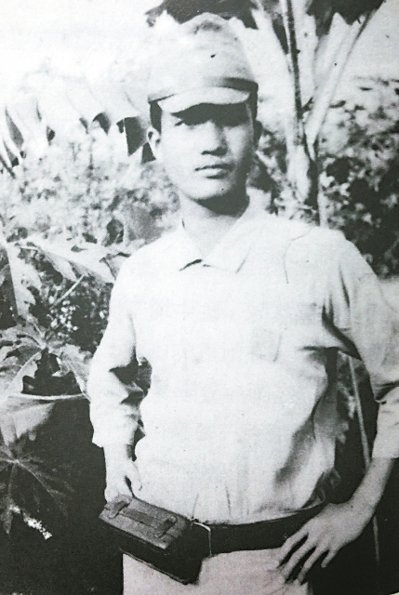
Liu Wan-lai in 1945

Liu Wan-lai (Chinese: 劉萬來; born 1929, died 17 February 2016) was a Japanese–Chinese translator active in Taiwan during the martial law period (1949–1987). He translated genre literature, hobby literature (particularly on trains and trams), and manga series including Galaxy Express 999 and Space Battleship Yamato. The popularity of his translations led to him being described as "a legend" and "a literary demigod".

Liu studied at Chiayi Agricultural and Forestry Vocational High School. He translated, and taught Japanese, alongside a day job as an elementary school teacher in Dalin, Chiayi. Many of his translations were commissioned by the Dashan Bookstore in Tainan. In 2015 he published an autobiography.
