= Emerald Pacific Airlines =

Aviation company of Taiwan

Emerald Pacific Airlines 凌天航空
- Industry: aviation
- Founded: November 1994
- Headquarters: Shalu, Taichung, Taiwan
- Total assets: NT$ 210 million (June 1997)

Emerald Pacific Airlines (Chinese: 凌天航空; pinyin: Língtiān Hángkōng) is an aviation company of Taiwan.

== History ==
The company was founded in November 1994. In 1998, the company made a contract with Taiwan Power Company (Taipower) for overhead power line insulator cleaning works.

== Services ==
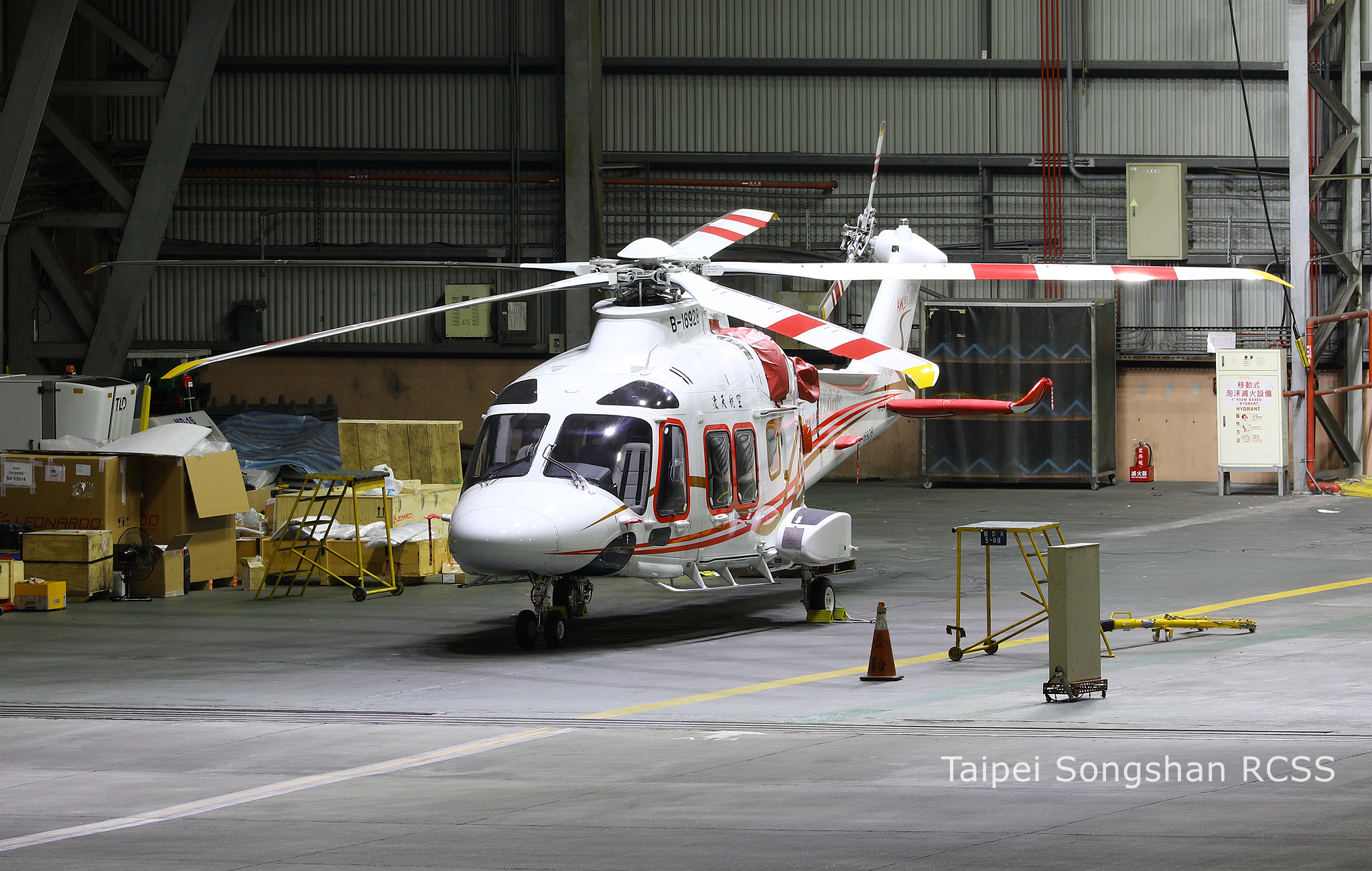
Emerald Pacific Airlines helicopter

The company operates in the area of aerial photography, agricultural chemical spraying, disaster relief, overhead power line insulator cleaning, construction rigging and loading etc.

== Accidents and incidents ==
- On 22 November 2015, an Emerald Pacific Airlines Bell 206B helicopter crashed during Taipower overhead power line insulator cleaning in Taishan District, New Taipei killing two people on board.

== See also ==
- List of companies of Taiwan
