= Formosa Fun Coast =

Former water park in Bali, New Taipei, Taiwan

- 八仙海岸
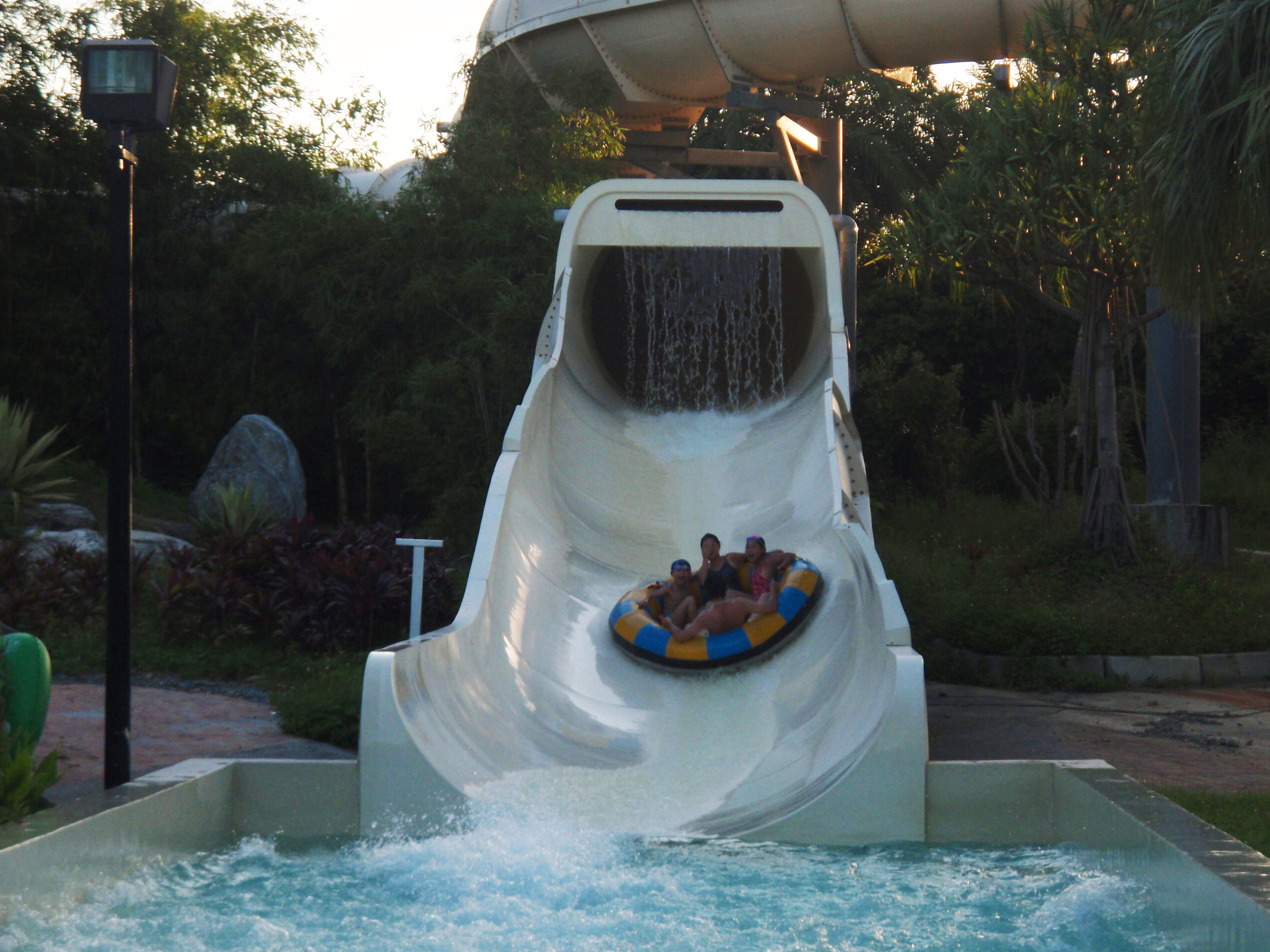
- Formosa Fun Coast in August 2009 Location in Taiwan

General information
- Type: Amusement park
- Location: Bali, New Taipei, Taiwan
- Coordinates: 25°08′41″N 121°23′20″E
- Opening: 8 July 1989
- Closed: 27 June 2015

Technical details
- Floor area: 12 hectares

Formosa Fun Coast (Chinese: 八仙海岸; pinyin: Bāxiān Hǎi'àn, also known as 八仙樂園; Bāxiān Lèyuán; 'eight immortals paradise" or less literally "myriad immortals paradise') was a theme park in Bali District, New Taipei, Taiwan. It closed in the aftermath of 2015 New Taipei water park fire.

== History ==
The theme park was constructed in 1989.

=== 2015 cornstarch fire incident ===
On 27 June 2015, flammable powder, which had been sprayed above the visitors, was set alight during an event hosted by an independent marketing firm leasing space at the park. The incident killed 15 and injured several hundred. In addition, 497 people were injured, many of them seriously. The park closed to facilitate investigations. On 1 March 2017, the Taipei Administrative High Court decided the park could reopen when the court overturned the government order to suspend its license. On 23 June 2019, the demolition of buildings on the site began. After the incident, some of the park's facilities were removed and as of 2022, have not been restored.

== Architecture ==
The theme park spans over a 12-hectare (30-acre) area.

== Attractions ==
- Water Park
- Ecology World

== Transportation ==
The theme park is accessible by bus from Guandu Station of Taipei Metro.

== See also ==
- List of tourist attractions in Taiwan
