= Rebar (Taiwan) =

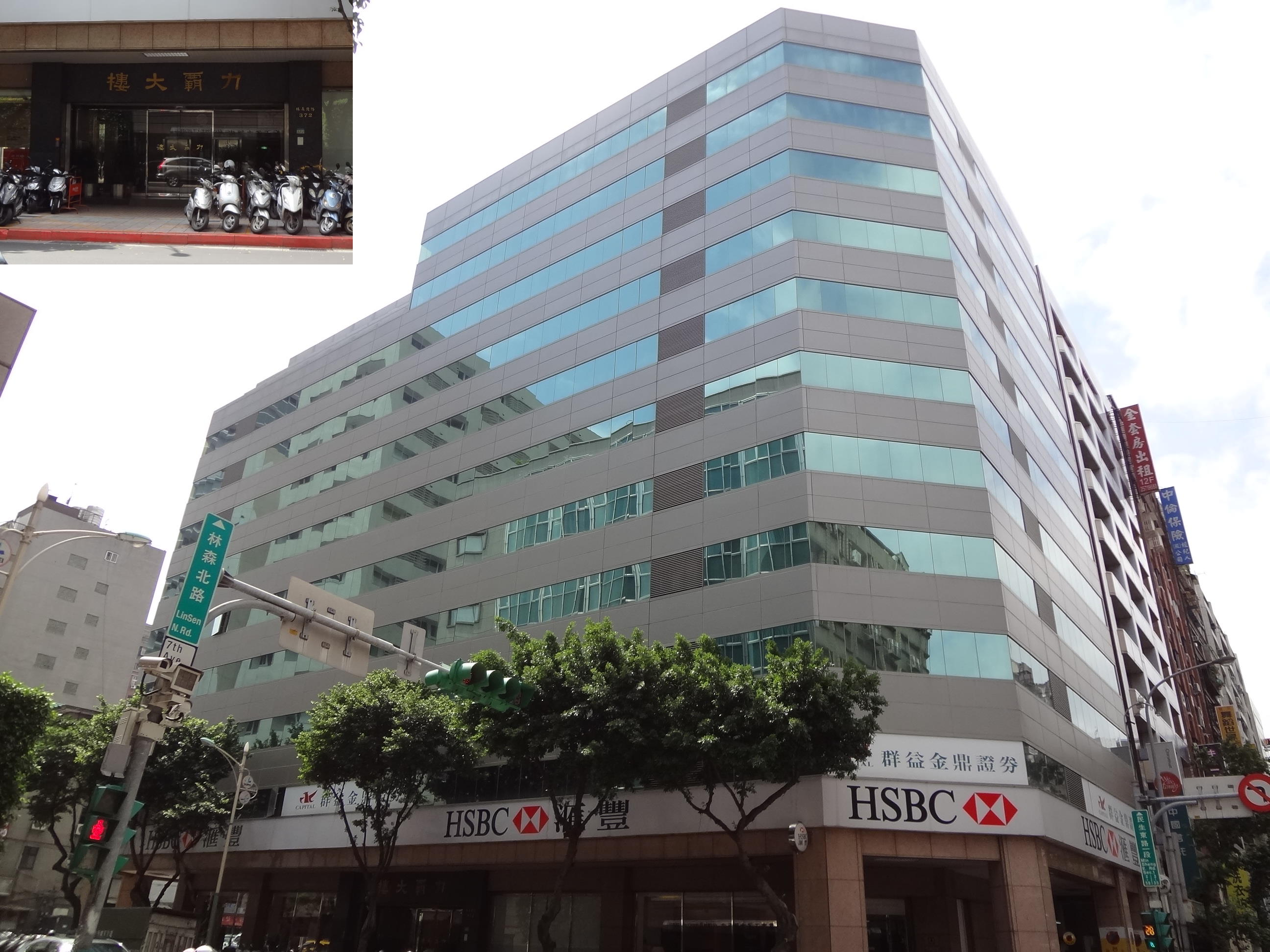
Rebar Group company headquarter in Taipei

The Rebar Group (Rebar; Chinese: 力霸集團; pinyin: Lìbà Jítuán) is a large corporation involved in domestic textiles, construction, hotel/real estate, retail services, vehicle/building insurance, banking, and media in Taiwan.

== History ==
The company started out in the 1960s as a reinforcement bar manufacturer, hence its name.

The corporation recently gained large shares of the Taiwanese cable media as OmniMedia (東森) TV Corp and also mobile telephone business as Asia Pacific Telecom Group (亞太) in the late 1990s.

Towards the end of 2006 Rebar was encountering serious difficulties following years of allegedly hiding financial problems with bad loans from The Chinese Bank. The CEO and founder, Wang You-theng (王又曾) is alleged to have engaged in insider trading and embezzlement in connection to this, and fled Taiwan on 30 December 2006, days before prosecutors began their investigation. You-theng was detained in the U.S. and was wanted by Taiwanese prosecutors for allegedly embezzling NT$60 billion (US$1.8 billion) in corporate funds. He died in May 2016 in a traffic accident.

== Branches ==
Branches include:

- TV: OmniMedia (東森)
- Finance: Chinese Bank, Union Insurance
- Service: Rebar Realstate, Rebar Retail Chain, Rebar Hotel, Taipei Aquarium
- Manufacturing: Rebar Construction, Rebar Foods (esp. cooking oil)
- Telecommunications: Asia Pacific Telecom (亞太)

== See also ==
- List of companies of Taiwan
