= Chen Tien-miao =

Taiwanese politician (1928–2018)

Chen Tien-miao (Chinese: 陳田錨; Chinese: 陈田锚; pinyin: Chén Tiánmáo; Wade–Giles: Chen Tien-miao; 16 April 1928 – 7 March 2018) was a Taiwanese politician.

== Political career ==
Chen Tien-mao was born on 16 April 1928, to Chen Chi-chin of the Chen family from Kaohsiung. Chen Chi-chin's brother Chen Chi-chuan served as mayor of Kaohsiung from 1960 to 1968. Chen Tien-mao himself was first elected to the Kaohsiung City Council in 1958, and served as council speaker for four terms.

== Business career ==
Chen and his family owned the Hsinkao Petroleum Company and held management positions at Ta Chong Bank.

== Death ==
Chen Tien-mao died in Kaohsiung, on 7 March 2018, aged 89.
