= Luo Lan =

Taiwanese writer and radio personality

- 羅蘭
- Born: Chin Pei-fen; 10 October 1919; Ninghe, Hebei
- Died: 29 August 2015 (aged 95)
- Occupation: Writer

Luo Lan (Chinese: 羅蘭; pinyin: Luó Lán; 10 October 1919 – 29 August 2015) was a Taiwanese writer and radio personality. Born Chin Pei-fen (靳佩芬) in Ninghe, Hebei, she moved to Taiwan from Tianjin in 1948. Luo was first published in 1963 and became well-known first in Taiwan, before finding the same success in China after the opening of the Three Links. Best known for an essay collection, Luo Lan Xiao Yu, she won a Golden Bell silver class special award in 1994. Luo died of cardiopulmonary failure in Taipei on 29 August 2015. She received two governmental citations during the course of her career. The first was issued by the Ministry of Education in 1979, and the second was posthumously awarded by the Ministry of Culture in 2015.
