= Religion in China =

Religion in China by self-identified affiliation (Pew Research Center 2023) (Note: Source: Chinese General Social Survey, 2021 The 2021 data was collected during the COVID-19 pandemic and in fewer provinces, municipalities and autonomous regions (19) than in the 2018 wave (28).)
1. No religion (93.0%)
2. Buddhism (3.70%)
3. Folk beliefs (Note: It is a syncretism between Taoism, Buddhism, philosophies such as Confucianism, elements of Shamanism and the veneration of spirits.) (0.20%)
4. Christianity (1.40%)
5. Islam (1.30%)
6. Other (0.30%)
Religious affiliation among persons claiming one (The World Factbook 2021) (Note: It is often difficult to differentiate between followers of Taoism, Buddhism, and the irreligious because popular beliefs are generally not claimed as a personal identity or affiliation.)
1. Unaffiliated (52.1%)
2. Folk beliefs (Note: It is a syncretism between Taoism, Buddhism, philosophies such as Confucianism, elements of Shamanism and the veneration of spirits.) (21.9%)
3. Buddhism (18.2%)
4. Christianity (5.10%)
5. Islam (1.80%)
6. Others (0.90%)

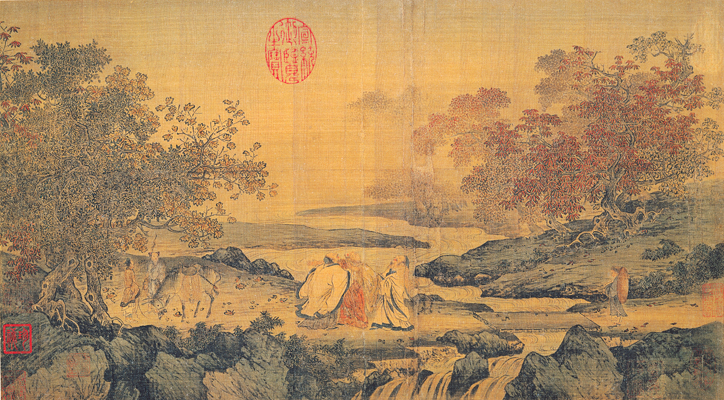
Three laughs at Tiger Brook, a Song dynasty (12th century) painting portraying three men representing Confucianism, Taoism and Buddhism laughing together

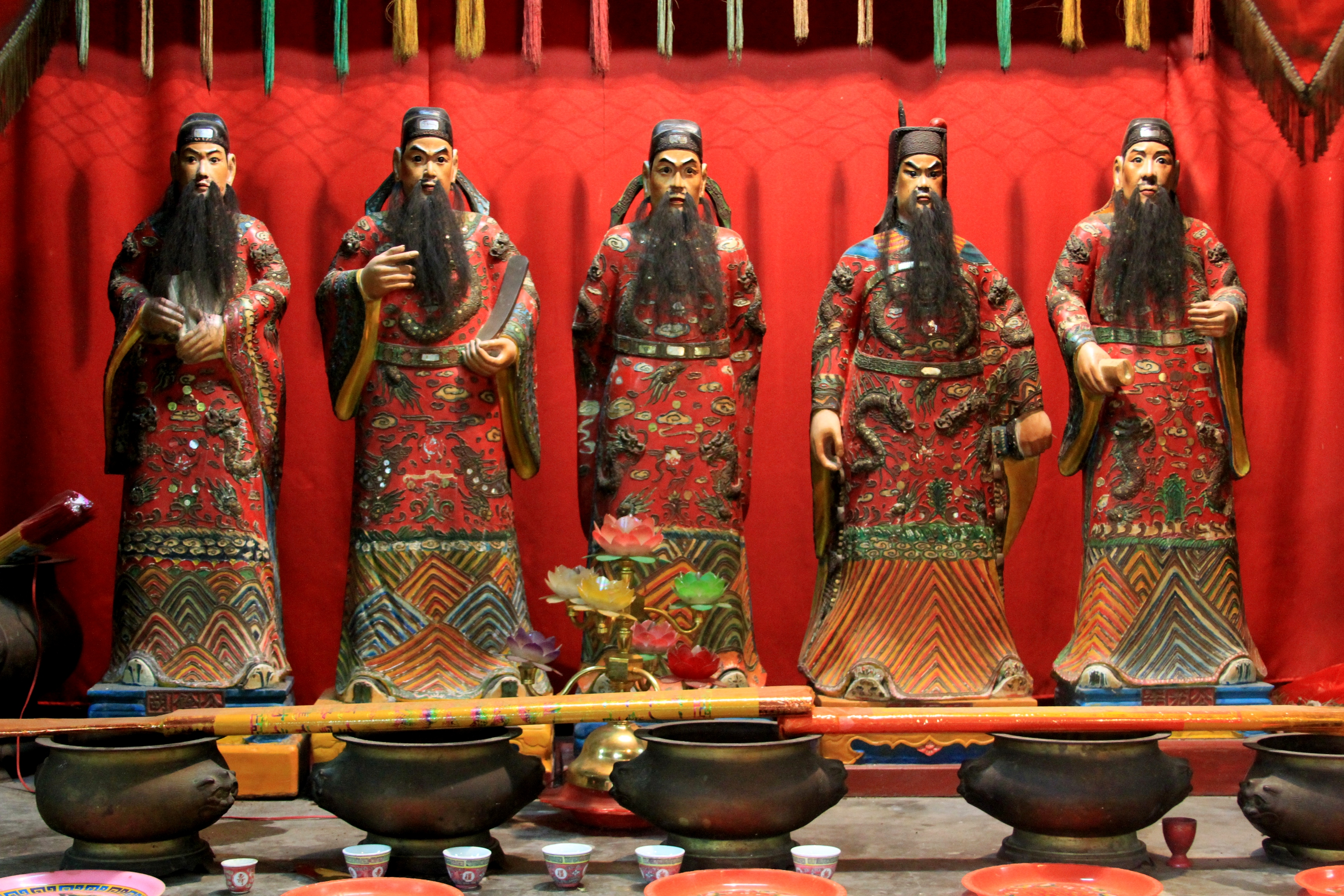
Altar to the five officials worshipped inside the Temple of the Five Lords in Haikou, Hainan

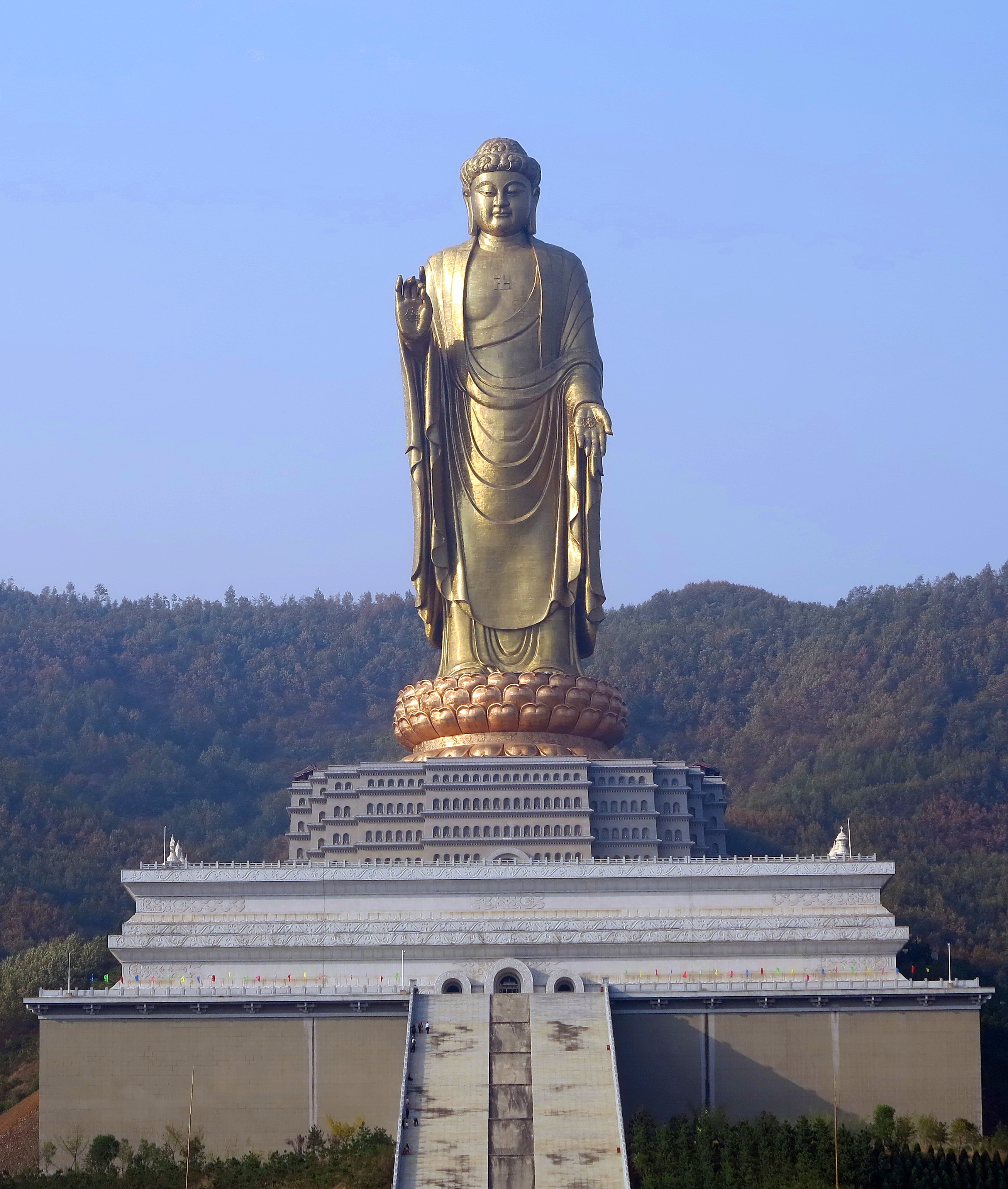
The Spring Temple Buddha is a 153 metres (502 ft) statue depicting Vairocana Buddha located in Lushan County, Henan

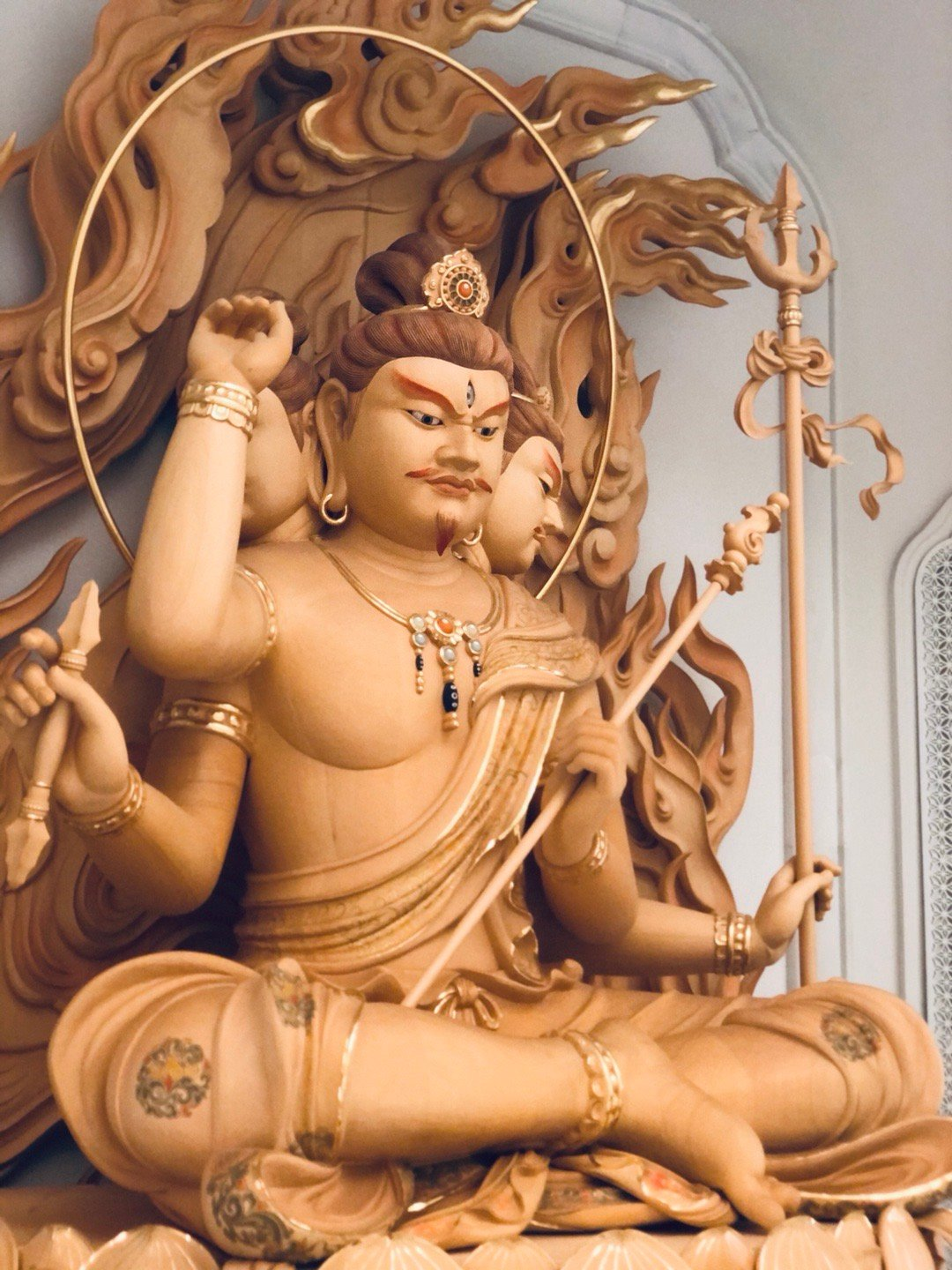
Shrine dedicated to the worship of Maheśvara (Shiva) on Mount Putuo in Zhoushan, Zhejiang

Religion in China is diverse and most Chinese people are either non-religious or practice a combination of Buddhism and Taoism with a Confucian worldview, which is collectively termed Chinese folk religion.

Freedom of religion is substantially curtailed in China. The ruling Chinese Communist Party (CCP) officially espouses state atheism, and has conducted antireligious campaigns to this end. The Chinese government formally recognizes five religions: Buddhism, Taoism, Christianity (Catholicism and Protestantism are recognized separately), and Islam. All religious institutions in the country are required to uphold the leadership of the Chinese Communist Party (CCP), implement Xi Jinping Thought, and promote Religious Sinicization under the general secretaryship of Xi Jinping.

A 2023 Pew survey found 93% of the country reported no religious affiliation. According to 2021 estimates from the CIA World Factbook, among people claiming any religious beliefs, 52.1% of the population is unaffiliated, 21.9% follows Chinese Folk Religion, 18.2% follows Buddhism, 5.1% follows Christianity, 1.8% follows Islam, and 0.7% follows other religions including Taoism.

== Overview ==
Chinese civilization has historically long been a cradle and host to a variety of the most enduring religio-philosophical traditions of the world. Confucianism and Taoism, later joined by Buddhism, constitute the "three teachings" that have shaped Chinese culture. There are no clear boundaries between these intertwined religious systems, which do not claim to be exclusive, and elements of each enrich popular folk religion. The emperors of China claimed the Mandate of Heaven and participated in Chinese religious practices. In the early 20th century, reform-minded officials and intellectuals attacked religion in general as superstitious. Since 1949, the Chinese Communist Party (CCP), officially state atheist, has been in power in the country and prohibits CCP members from religious practice while in office. A series of anti-religious campaigns, which had begun during the late 19th century, culminated in the Cultural Revolution (1966–1976) against the Four Olds: old habits, old ideas, old customs, and old culture. The Cultural Revolution destroyed or forced many observances and religious organisations underground. Following the death of Mao, subsequent leaders have allowed Chinese religious organisations to have more autonomy. In the 1980s and 1990s, the central government began rebuilding places of worship destroyed during the Cultural Revolution.

Chinese folk religion, the country's most widespread system of beliefs and practices, has evolved and adapted since at least the second millennium BCE, during the Shang and Zhou dynasties. Fundamental elements of Chinese theology and cosmology hearken back to this period and became more elaborate during the Axial Age. In general, Chinese folk religion involves an allegiance to the shen ('spirits'), which encompass a variety of gods and immortals. These may be natural deities belonging to the environment, or ancient progenitors of human groups, concepts of civility, or culture heroes, of whom many feature throughout Chinese history and mythology. During the later Zhou, the philosophy and ritual teachings of Confucius began spreading throughout China, while Taoist institutions had developed by the Han dynasty. During the Tang dynasty, Buddhism became widely popular in China, and Confucian thinkers responded by developing neo-Confucian philosophies. Chinese salvationist religions and local cults thrived.

Christianity and Islam arrived in China during the 7th century. Christianity did not take root until it was reintroduced in the 16th century by Jesuit missionaries. In the early 20th century, Christian communities grew. However, after 1949, foreign missionaries were expelled, and churches were brought under government-controlled institutions. After the late 1970s, religious freedoms for Christians improved and new Chinese groups emerged. Islam has been practiced in Chinese society for 1,400 years. Muslims constitute a minority group in China; according to the latest estimates, they represent between 0.45% and 1.8% of the total population. While Hui people are the most numerous subgroup, the greatest concentration of Muslims is in Xinjiang, which has a significant Uyghur population. Some scholars have argued that Confucianism can be considered a form of Humanism, primarily through its concept of "humaneness" or ren (仁), or a form of Secularism, and that Confucianism potentially influenced secularism in the European Enlightenment.

Because many Han Chinese do not consider their spiritual beliefs and practices to be a "religion" as such, and do not feel that they must practice any one of them to the exclusion of others, it is difficult to gather clear and reliable statistics. According to one scholar, the "great majority of China's population" participates in religion—the rituals and festivals of the lunar calendar—without being party to any religious institution. National surveys conducted during the early 21st century estimated that an estimated 80% of the Chinese population practice some form of folk religion, for a total of over 1 billion people. 13–16% of the population are Buddhists, 10% are Taoists, 2.53% are Christians, and 0.83% are Muslims. Folk salvation movements involve anywhere from 2–13% of the population. Many in the intellectual class adhere to Confucianism as a religious identity. Several ethnic minorities in China are particular to specific religions, including Tibetan Buddhism, and Islam among Hui and Uyghurs.

=== Terminology ===
The current meaning of "religion" (zongjiao 宗教) developed in Chinese discourses around 1900. In its earliest uses, it referred specifically to Christianity. It became more broadly used by intellectuals in China to describe exclusive systems of thought and practice with a congregational organization distinct from society as a whole, a viewpoint consistent with the Western post-Enlightenment view of religion.

== History ==
=== Pre-imperial ===
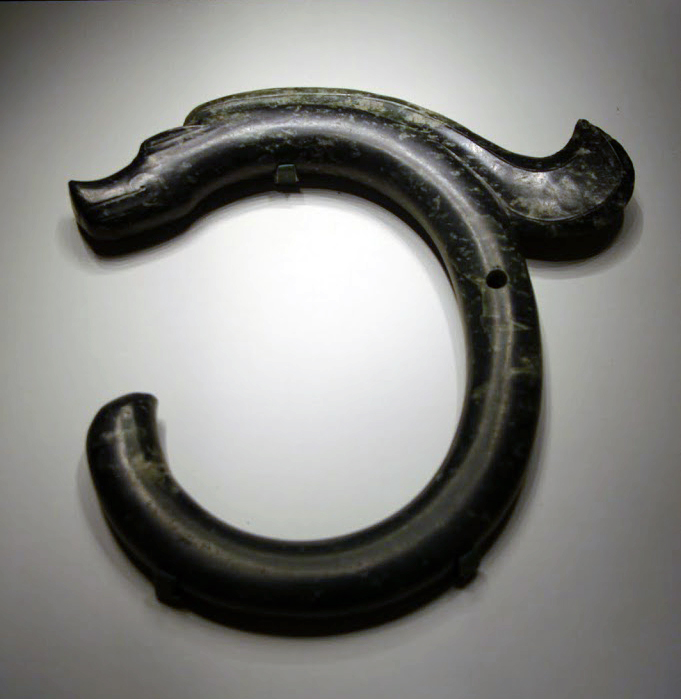
Jade dragon of the Hongshan culture. The dragon, associated with the constellation Draco winding around the north ecliptic pole, represents the "protean" primordial power, which embodies yin and yang in unity.

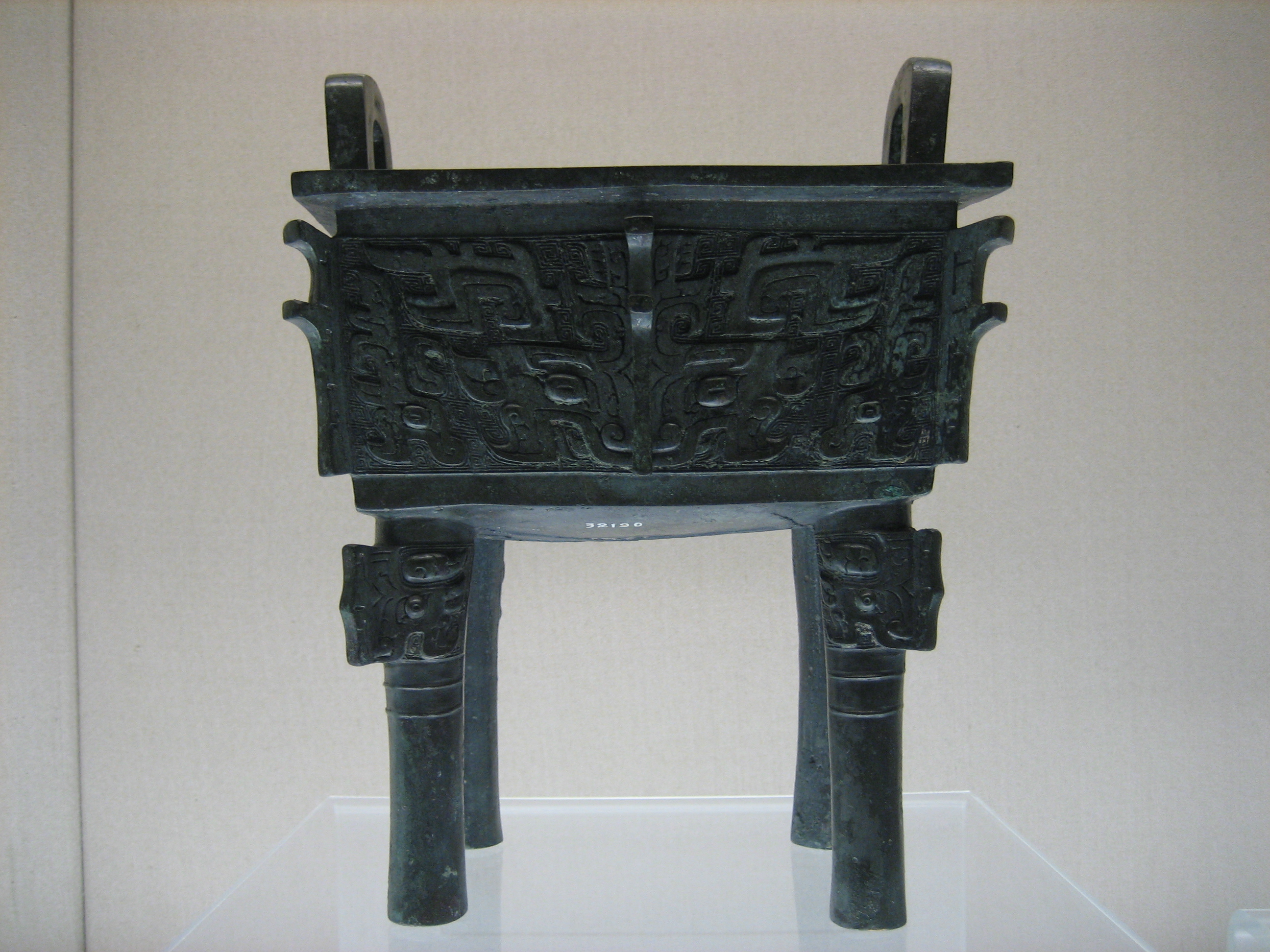
Squared dǐng 鼎 (ritual cauldron) with tāotiè 饕餮 motif. According to Didier, both the cauldrons and the taotie symmetrical faces originate as symbols of Di as the squared north celestial pole, with four faces.

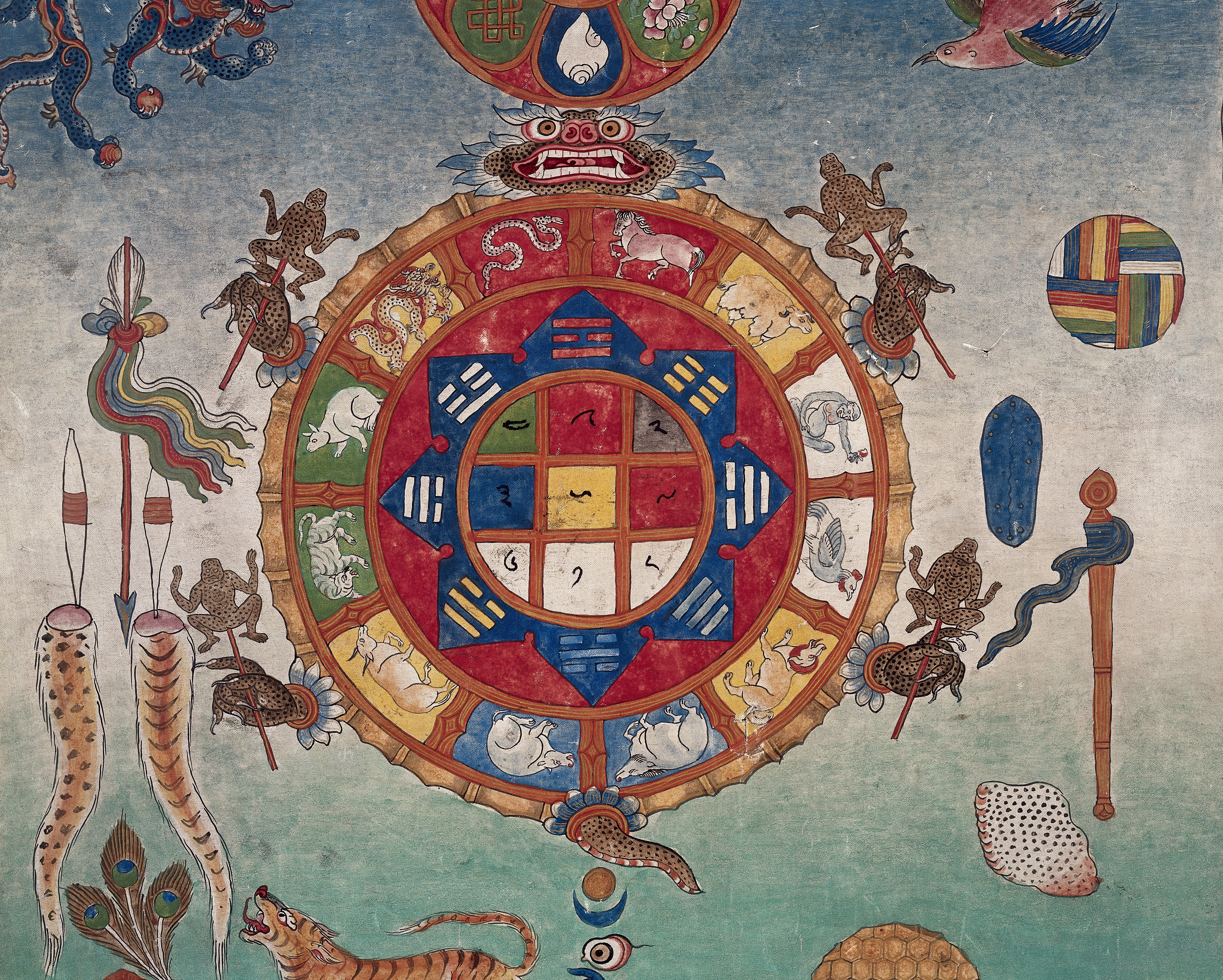
Tibetan chart for bloodletting based on the Luoshu square. The Luoshu, the Hetu, liubo boards, sundials, Han diviner's boards (shì 式) and luopan for fengshui, and the derived compass, as well as TLV mirrors, are all representations of Di as the north celestial pole.

Prior to the spread of world religions in East Asia, local tribes shared animistic, shamanic and totemic worldviews. Shamans mediated prayers, sacrifices, and offerings directly to the spiritual world; this heritage survives in various modern forms of religion throughout China. These traits are especially connected to cultures such as the Hongshan culture.

The Flemish philosopher Ulrich Libbrecht traces the origins of some features of Taoism to what Jan Jakob Maria de Groot called "Wuism", that is Chinese shamanism. Libbrecht distinguishes two layers in the development of the Chinese theology, derived respectively from the Shang (1600–1046 BCE) and Zhou dynasties (1046–256 BCE). The Shang state religion was based on the worship of ancestors and god-kings, who survived as unseen forces after death. They were not transcendent entities, since the universe was "by itself so", not created by a force outside of it but generated by internal rhythms and cosmic powers. The later Zhou dynasty was more agricultural in its world-view; they instead emphasised a universal concept of Heaven referred to as Tian. The Shang's identification of Shangdi as their ancestor-god had asserted their claim to power by divine right; the Zhou transformed this claim into a legitimacy based on moral power, the Mandate of Heaven. Zhou kings declared that their victory over the Shang was because they were virtuous and loved their people, while the Shang were tyrants and thus were deprived of power by Tian.

By the 6th century BCE, divine right was no longer an exclusive privilege of the Zhou royal house. The rhetorical power of Tian had become "diffuse" and claimed by different potentates in the Zhou states to legitimize political ambitions, but might be bought by anyone able to afford the elaborate ceremonies and the old and new rites required to access the authority of Tian. The population no longer perceived the official tradition as an effective way to communicate with Heaven. The traditions of the "Nine Fields" and Yijing flourished. Chinese thinkers then diverged in a "Hundred Schools of Thought", each proposing its own theories for the reconstruction of the Zhou moral order. Confucius appeared in this period of decadence and questioning. He was educated in Shang–Zhou theology, and his new formulation gave centrality to self-cultivation, human agency, and the educational power of the self-established individual in assisting others to establish themselves. As the Zhou collapsed, traditional values were abandoned. Disillusioned with the widespread vulgarization of rituals to access Tian, Confucius began to preach an ethical interpretation of traditional Zhou religion. In his view, the power of Tian is immanent, and responds positively to the sincere heart driven by the qualities of humaneness, rightness, decency and altruism that Confucius conceived of as the foundation needed to restore socio-political harmony. He also thought that a prior state of meditation was necessary to engage in the ritual acts. Confucius amended and re-codified the classics inherited from the pre-imperial era, and composed the Spring and Autumn Annals.

=== Qin and Han ===
The short-lived Qin dynasty chose Legalism as the state ideology, banning and persecuting all other schools of thought. Confucianism was harshly suppressed, with the burning of Confucian classics and killing of scholars who espoused the Confucian cause. The state ritual of the Qin was similar to that of the following Han dynasty. Qin Shi Huang personally held sacrifices to Di at Mount Tai, a site dedicated to the worship of the supreme God since before the Xia, and in the suburbs of the capital Xianyang. The emperors of Qin also concentrated the cults of the five forms of God, previously held at different locations, in unified temple complexes. The universal religion of the Han was focused on the idea of the incarnation of God as the Yellow Emperor, the central figure of the Wufang Shangdi. The idea of the incarnation of God was not new, as the Shang also regarded themselves as divine. Besides these developments, the latter Han dynasty was characterised by new religious phenomena: the emergence of Taoism outside state orthodoxy, the rise of indigenous millenarian religious movements, and the introduction of Buddhism. By the Han dynasty, the mythical Yellow Emperor was understood as being conceived by the virgin Fubao, who was impregnated by the radiance of Taiyi.

Emperor Wu of Han formulated the doctrine of the Interactions Between Heaven and Mankind, and of prominent fangshi, while outside the state religion the Yellow God was the focus of Huang-Lao religious movements which influenced primitive Taoism. Before the Confucian turn of Emperor Wu and after him, the early and later Han dynasty had Huang-Lao as the state doctrine under various emperors, where Laozi was identified as the Yellow Emperor and received imperial sacrifices. The Eastern Han struggled with both internal instability and menace by non-Chinese peoples from the outer edges of the empire. In such harsh conditions, while the imperial cult continued the sacrifices to the cosmological gods, common people estranged from the rationalism of the state religion found solace in enlightened masters and in reviving and perpetuating more or less abandoned cults of national, regional and local divinities that better represented indigenous identities. The Han state religion was "ethnicised" by associating the cosmological deities to regional populations. By the end of the Eastern Han, the earliest record of a mass religious movement attests the excitement provoked by the belief in the imminent advent of the Queen Mother of the West in the northeastern provinces. From the elites' point of view, the movement was connected to a series of abnormal cosmic phenomena seen as characteristic of an excess of yin.

Between 184 and 205 CE, the Way of the Supreme Peace in the Central Plains organized the Yellow Turban Rebellion against the Han. Later Taoist religious movements flourished in the Han state of Shu. A shaman named Zhang Xiu was known to have led a group of followers from Shu into the uprising of the year 184. In 191, he reappeared as a military official in the province, together with the apparently unrelated Zhang Lu. During a military mission in Hanning, Xiu died in battle. Between 143 and 198, starting with the grandfather Zhang Daoling and culminating with Zhang Lu, the Zhang lineage established the early Celestial Masters church. Zhang died in 216 or 217, and between 215 and 219 the people of Hanzhong were gradually dispersed northwards, spreading Celestial Masters' Taoism to other parts of the empire.

=== Three Kingdoms through Tang ===
Buddhism was introduced during the latter Han dynasty, and first mentioned in 65 CE, entering China via the Silk Road, transmitted by the Buddhist populations who inhabited the Western Regions, then Indo-Europeans (predominantly Tocharians and Saka). It began to grow to become a significant influence in China proper only after the fall of the Han dynasty, in the period of political division. When Buddhism had become an established religion it began to compete with Chinese indigenous religion and Taoist movements, deprecated in Buddhist polemics. After the first stage of the Three Kingdoms (220–280), China was partially unified under the Jin. The fall of Luoyang to the Xiongnu in 311 led the royal court and Celestial Masters' clerics to migrate southwards. Jiangnan became the center of the "southern tradition" of Celestial Masters' Taoism, which developed a meditation technique known as "guarding the One"—visualizing the unity God in the human organism. Representatives of Jiangnan responded to the spread of Celestial Masters' Taoism by reformulating their own traditions, leading to Shangqing Taoism, based on revelations that occurred between 364 and 370 in modern-day Nanjing, and Lingbao Taoism, based on revelations of the years between 397 and 402 and re-codified by Lu Xiujing. Lingbao incorporated from Buddhism the ideas of "universal salvation" and ranked "heavens", and focused on communal rituals.

In the Tang dynasty the concept of Tian became more common at the expense of Di, continuing a tendency that started in the Han dynasty. Both also expanded their meanings, with Di now more frequently used as suffix of a deity's name rather than to refer to the supreme power. Tian, besides, became more associated with its meaning of "Heaven" as a paradise. The proliferation of foreign religions in the Tang, especially Buddhist sects, entailed that each of them conceived their own ideal "Heaven". "Tian" itself started to be used, linguistically, as an affix in composite names to mean "heavenly" or "divine". This was also the case in the Buddhist context, with many monasteries' names containing this element. Both Buddhism and Taoism developed hierarchic pantheons which merged metaphysical (celestial) and physical (terrestrial) being, blurring the edge between human and divine, which reinforced the religious belief that gods and devotees sustain one another.

The principle of reciprocity between the human and the divine led to changes in the pantheon that reflected changes in the society. The late Tang dynasty saw the spread of the cult of the City Gods in direct bond to the development of the cities as centers of commerce and the rise in influence of merchant classes. Commercial travel opened China to influences from foreign cultures.

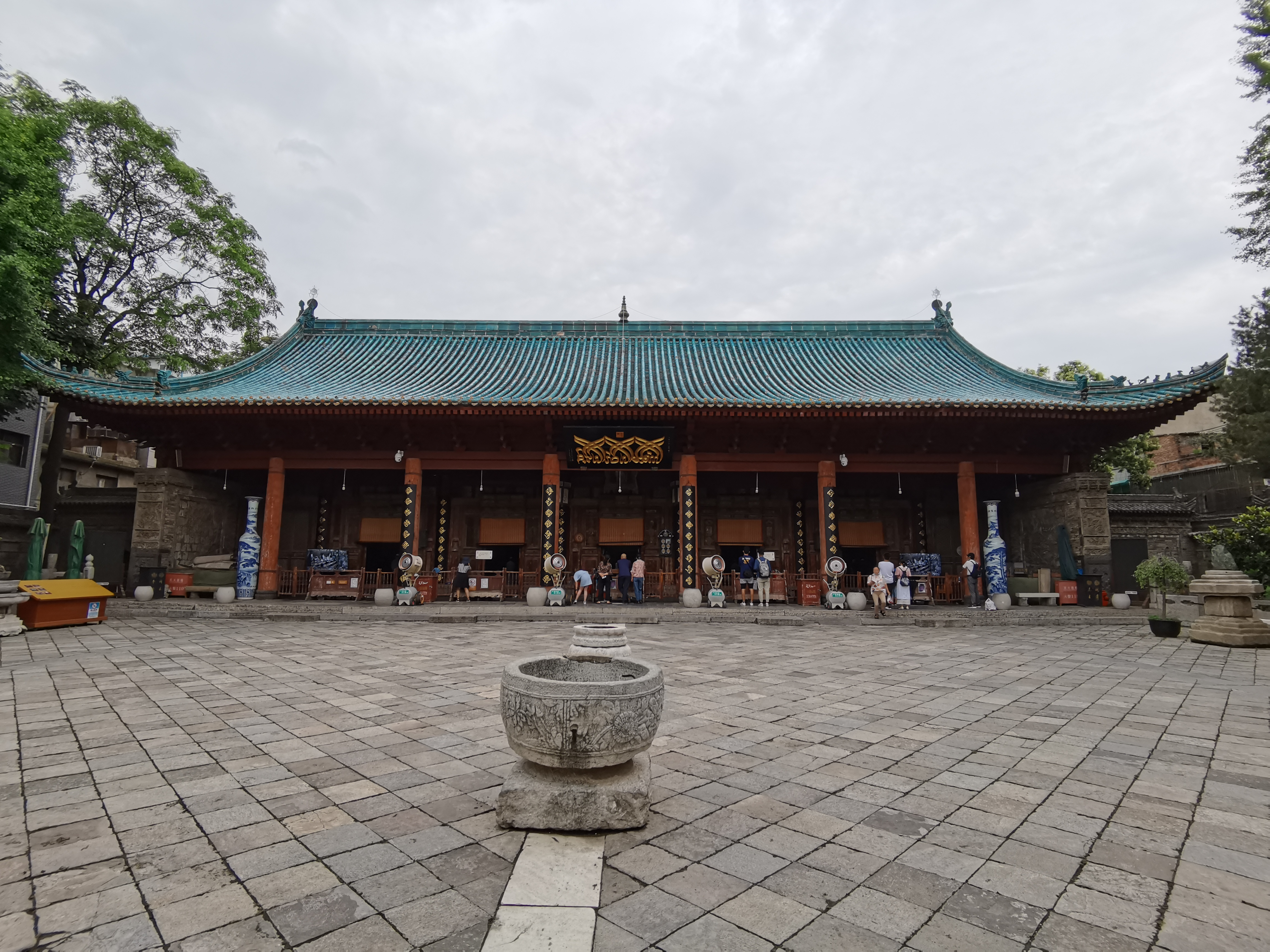
Great Mosque of Xi'an established in 742

Islam was introduced to China during the early Tang dynasty, from the Chang'an to Fujian-Guandong. Chinese scholars consider the second year of Tang Yonghui regin (651 AD) as the year when Islam was introduced to China through Muslim merchants that did business and settled in Chang'an but also in the coast cities of Guangzhou and Quanzhou. Tang-era mosques that remain standing to this day include the Great Mosque of Xi'an the Huaisheng Mosque and the Xianxian Mosque both in Guangzhou.

The earliest evidence of Christianity in China dates to the Eighth century. It is a stone stele in Xi'an inscribed with a summary of basic Nestorian teachings.

=== Early modern period ===
In the 16th century, the Jesuit China missions played a significant role in opening dialogue between China and the West. The Jesuits brought Western sciences, becoming advisers to the imperial court on astronomy, taught mathematics and mechanics, but also adapted Chinese religious ideas such as admiration for Confucius and ancestor veneration into the religious doctrine they taught in China. The Manchu-led Qing dynasty promoted the teachings of Confucius as the textual tradition superior to all others. The Qing made their laws more severely patriarchal than any previous dynasty, and Buddhism and Taoism were downgraded. Despite this, Tibetan Buddhism began in this period to have significant presence in China, with Tibetan influence in the west, and with the Mongols and Manchus in the north. Later, many folk religious and institutional religious temples were destroyed during the Taiping Rebellion. It was organised by Christian movements which established a separate state in southeast China against the Qing dynasty. In the Christian-inspired Taiping Heavenly Kingdom, official policies pursued the elimination of Chinese religions to substitute them with forms of Christianity. In this effort, the libraries of the Buddhist monasteries were destroyed, almost completely in the Yangtze River Delta.

As a reaction, the Boxer Rebellion at the turn of the century would have been inspired by indigenous Chinese movements against the influence of Christian missionaries—"devils" as they were called by the Boxers—and Western colonialism. At that time China was being gradually invaded by European and American powers, and since 1860 Christian missionaries had had the right to build or rent premises, and they appropriated many temples. Churches with their high steeples and foreigners' infrastructures, factories and mines were viewed as disrupting feng shui and caused "tremendous offense" to the Chinese. The Boxers' action was aimed at sabotaging or outright destroying these infrastructures.

=== 20th century to present ===
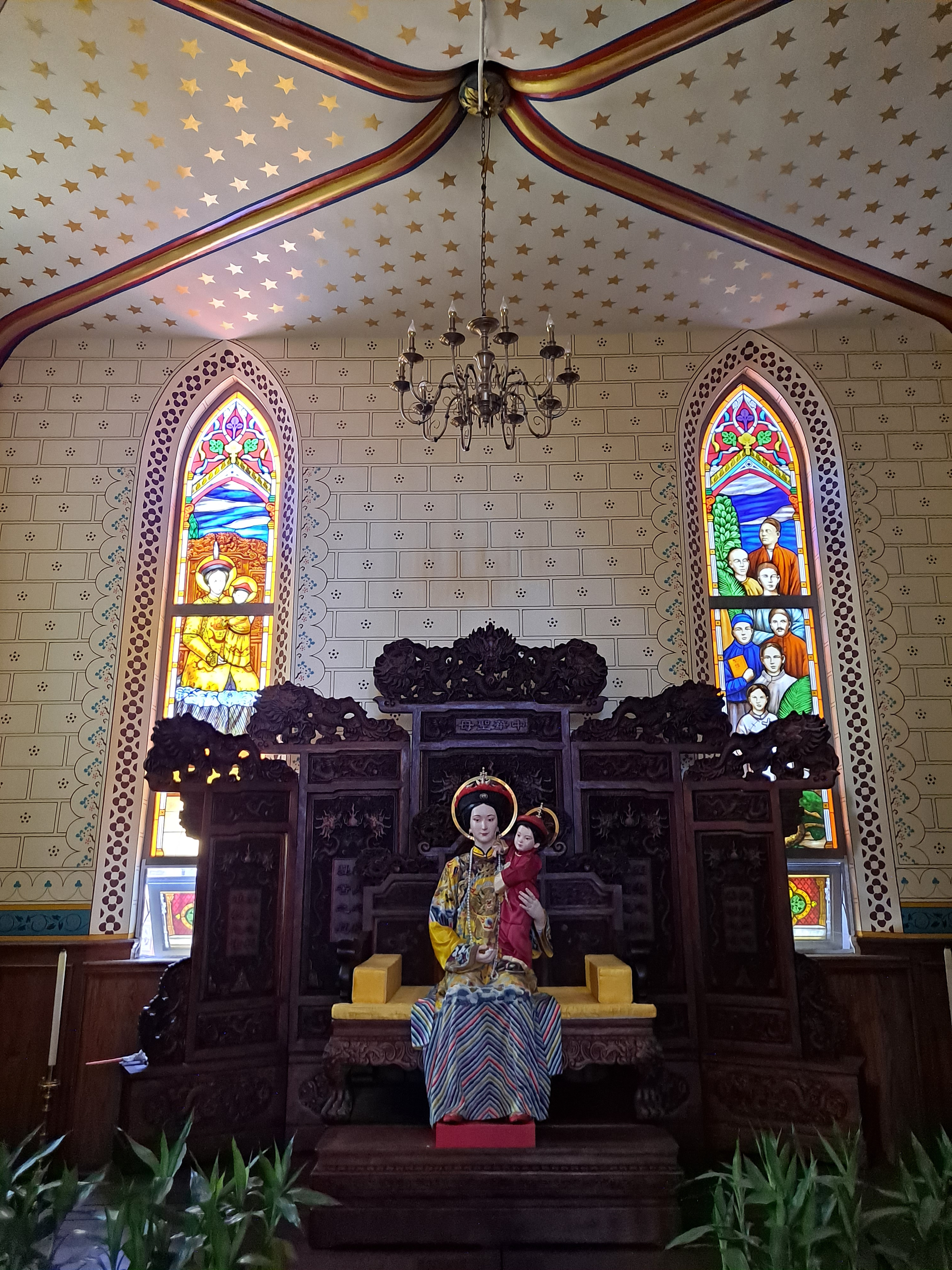
Our Lady of China, whose origins are based on a Marian apparition that occurred in the country at the beginning of the 20th century, installed at Church of the Saviour, Beijing

China entered the 20th century under the Manchu-led Qing dynasty, whose rulers favored traditional Chinese religions and participated in public religious ceremonies. Tibetan Buddhists recognized the Dalai Lama as their spiritual and temporal leader. Popular cults were regulated by imperial policies, promoting certain deities while suppressing others. During the anti-foreign and anti-Christian Boxer Rebellion, thousands of Chinese Christians and foreign missionaries were killed, but in the aftermath of the retaliatory invasion, numbers of reform-minded Chinese turned to Christianity. Between 1898 and 1904, the government issued a measure to "build schools with temple property".

After the Xinhai Revolution, the issue for the new intellectual class was no longer the worship of gods as it was the case in imperial times, but the de-legitimization of religion itself as an obstacle to modernization. Leaders of the New Culture Movement revolted against Confucianism, and the Anti-Christian Movement was part of a rejection of Christianity as an instrument of foreign imperialism. Despite all this, the interest of Chinese reformers in spiritual and occult matters continued to thrive through the 1940s. The Nationalist government of the Republic of China intensified the suppression of local religion, destroyed or appropriated temples, and formally abolished all cults of gods with the exception of human heroes such as Yu the Great, Guan Yu and Confucius. Sun Yat-sen and his successor Chiang Kai-shek were both Christians. During the Japanese invasion of China between 1937 and 1945 many temples were used as barracks by soldiers and destroyed in warfare.

Initially, the new government did not suppress religious practice, but viewed popular religious movements as possibly seditious. It condemned religious organizations, labeling them as superstitious. Religions that were deemed "appropriate" and given freedom were those that entailed the ancestral tradition of consolidated state rule.

Soviet Marxist interpretations of religion significantly influenced Chinese Marxist views and after the 1920s, the CCP political discourse on religion focused on conflict between theism and atheism, and the non-existence of gods, spirits, and supernatural phenomena.

From the Yan'an period through the 1950s, the CCP took a more accommodating approach to religion than in the Soviet Union, seeking to work with the five officially recognized religions within the United Front framework. The Three-Self Patriotic Movement institutionalized Protestant churches as official organizations. Catholics resisted the move towards state control and independence from the Vatican. The Cultural Revolution involved a systematic effort to destroy religion and New Confucianism.

The policy relaxed considerably in the late 1970s. China's 1978 Constitution stated, "[C]itizens enjoy freedom to believe in religion and freedom not to believe in religion and to propagate atheism." In 1980, the Central Committee of the Chinese Communist Party approved a request by the United Front Work Department to create a national conference for religious groups. The participating religious groups were the Catholic Patriotic Association, the Islamic Association of China, the Chinese Taoist Association, the Three-Self Patriotic Movement, and the Buddhist Association of China. For several decades, the CCP acquiesced or even encouraged religious revival. During the 1980s, the government took a permissive stance regarding foreign missionaries entering the country under the guise of teachers. Likewise, the government has been more tolerant of folk religious practices since Reform and Opening Up.

In 1981, the Central Committee of the CCP issued Document No. 19 describes the party-state's approach to religion. It states that religion is a characteristic of a period of development in human society, that religion will exist for a long time, and that it will eventually disappear as human society develops. Document No. 19 states that attempts to eliminate religion through coercion are counterproductive. It also states that criminal or counter-revolutionary activities practiced under the guise of religion will not be tolerated.

During the 1980s and 1990s, the central government began rebuilding places of worship destroyed during the Cultural Revolution. During those decades, the diversity of religious practice in rural China also increased. Protestantism grew rapidly in rural China in the 1980s and rapidly in urban China in the 1990s.

Although "heterodox teachings" such as the Falun Gong were banned and practitioners have been persecuted since 1999, local authorities were likely to follow a hands-off policy towards other religions.

In the late 20th century, there was a reactivation of state cults devoted to the Yellow Emperor and the Red Emperor. In the early 2000s, the Chinese government became open especially to traditional religions such as Mahayana Buddhism, Taoism, and folk religion, emphasizing the role of religion in building a Confucian Harmonious Society. The government founded the Confucius Institute in 2004 to promote Chinese culture. China hosted religious meetings and conferences including the first World Buddhist Forum in 2006, a number of international Taoist meetings, and local conferences on folk religions. Aligning with Chinese anthropologists' emphasis on "religious culture", the government considers these as integral expressions of national "Chinese culture".

A turning point was reached in 2005, when folk religious cults began to be protected and promoted under the policies of intangible cultural heritage. Not only were traditions that had been interrupted for decades resumed, but ceremonies forgotten for centuries were reinvented. The annual worship of the god Cancong of the ancient state of Shu, for instance, was resumed at a ceremonial complex near the Sanxingdui archaeological site in Sichuan. Modern Chinese political leaders have been deified into the common Chinese pantheon. The international community has become concerned about allegations that China has harvested the organs of Falun Gong practitioners and other religious minorities, including Christians and Uyghur Muslims. In 2012, Xi Jinping made fighting moral void and corruption through a return to traditional culture one of the primary tasks of the government. In 2018, during a series of institutional reforms, the National Religious Affairs Administration and its functions were merged into the United Front Work Department of the Central Committee of the Chinese Communist Party. In 2023, the government decreed that all places of worship must uphold the leadership of the Chinese Communist Party, implement Xi Jinping Thought, and promote the sinicization of religion.

== Demographics ==
=== Demoscopic analyses and general results ===
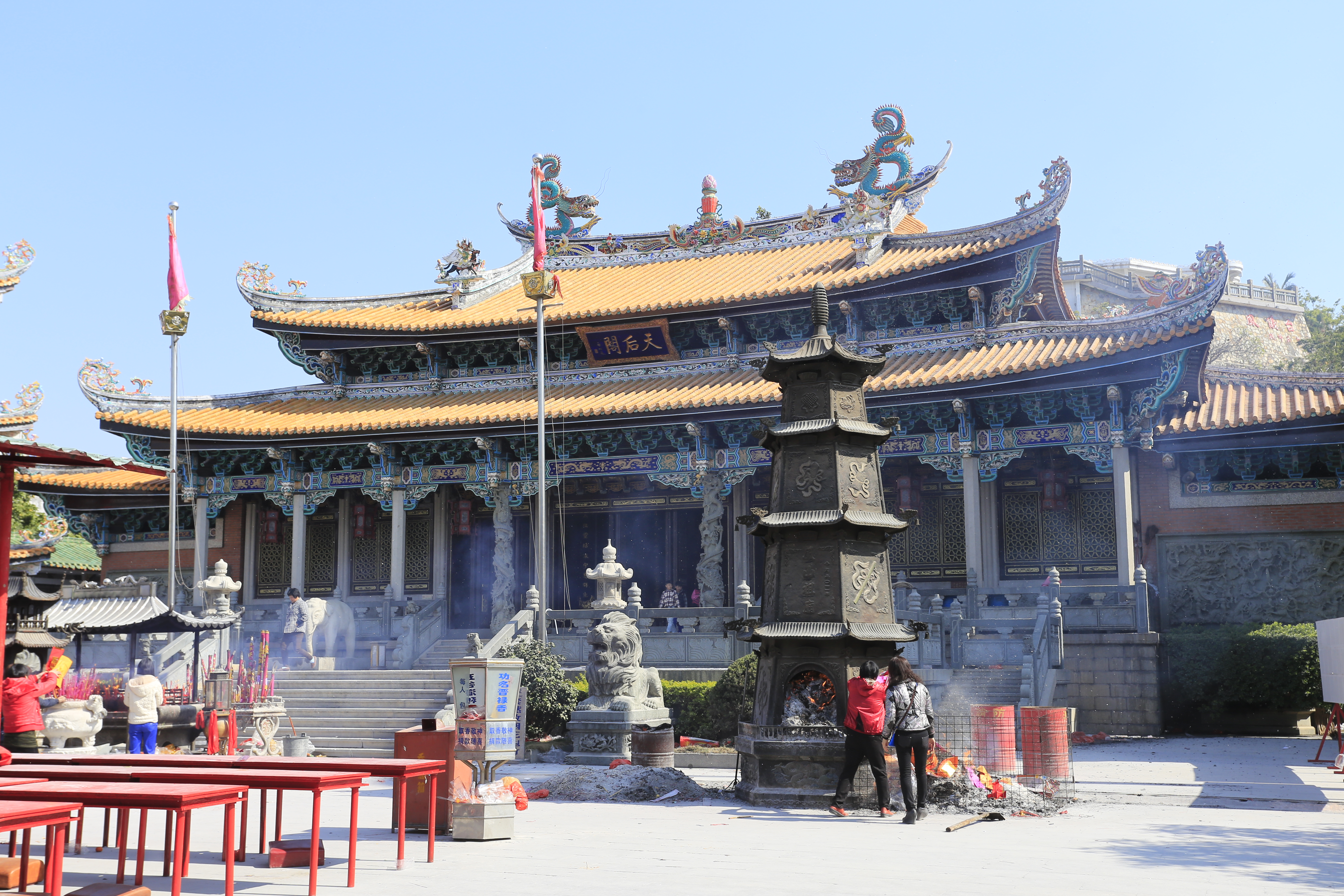
Temple of Mazu, the goddess of the sea, in Shanwei, Guangdong.

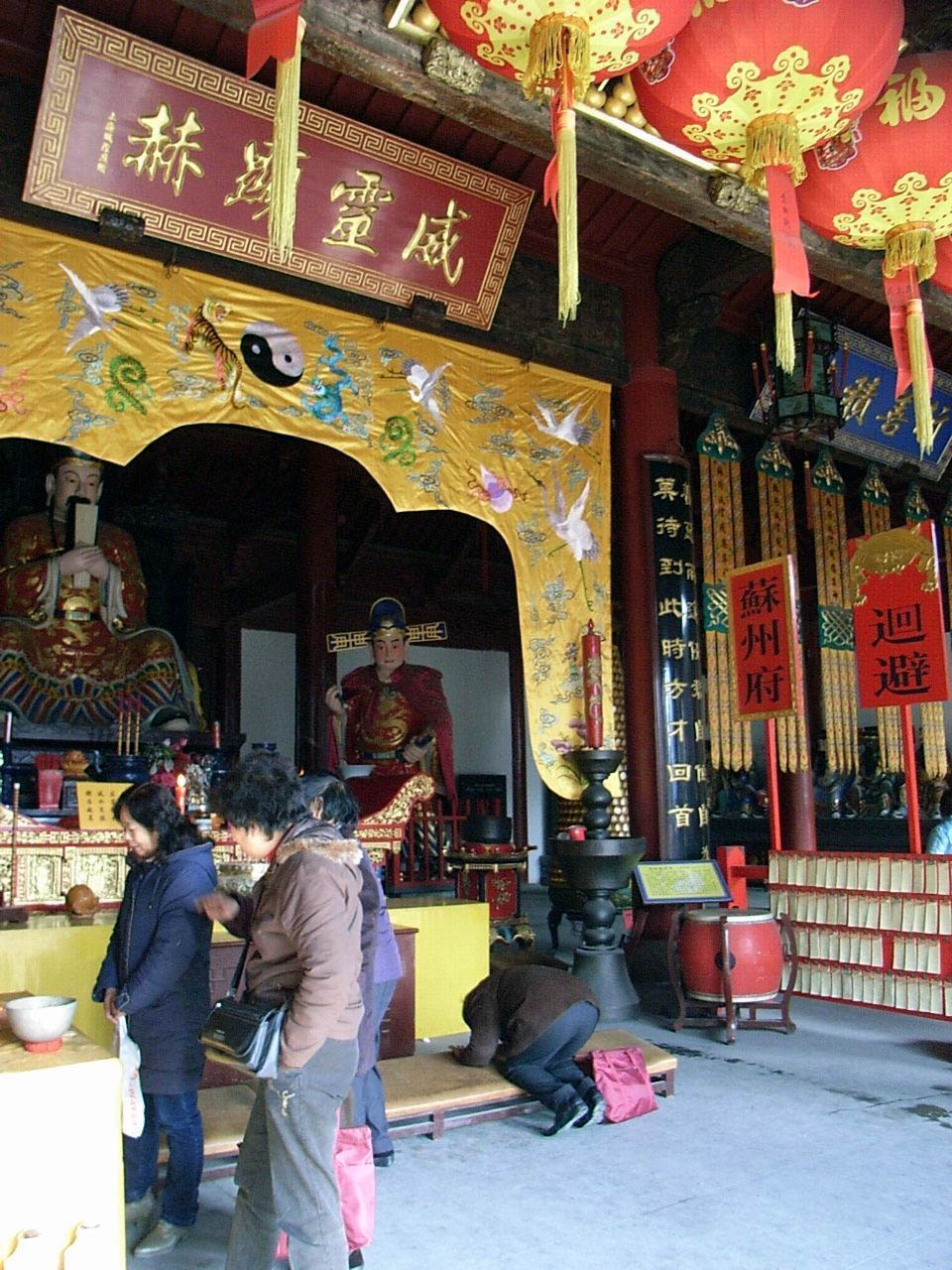
Worshipers at the Temple of the City God of Suzhou, Jiangsu. Is it Taoism or folk religion? To the general Chinese public they are not distinguished, but a lay practitioner would hardly claim to be a "Taoist", as Taoism is a set of doctrinal and liturgical functions that work as specialising patterns for the indigenous religion.

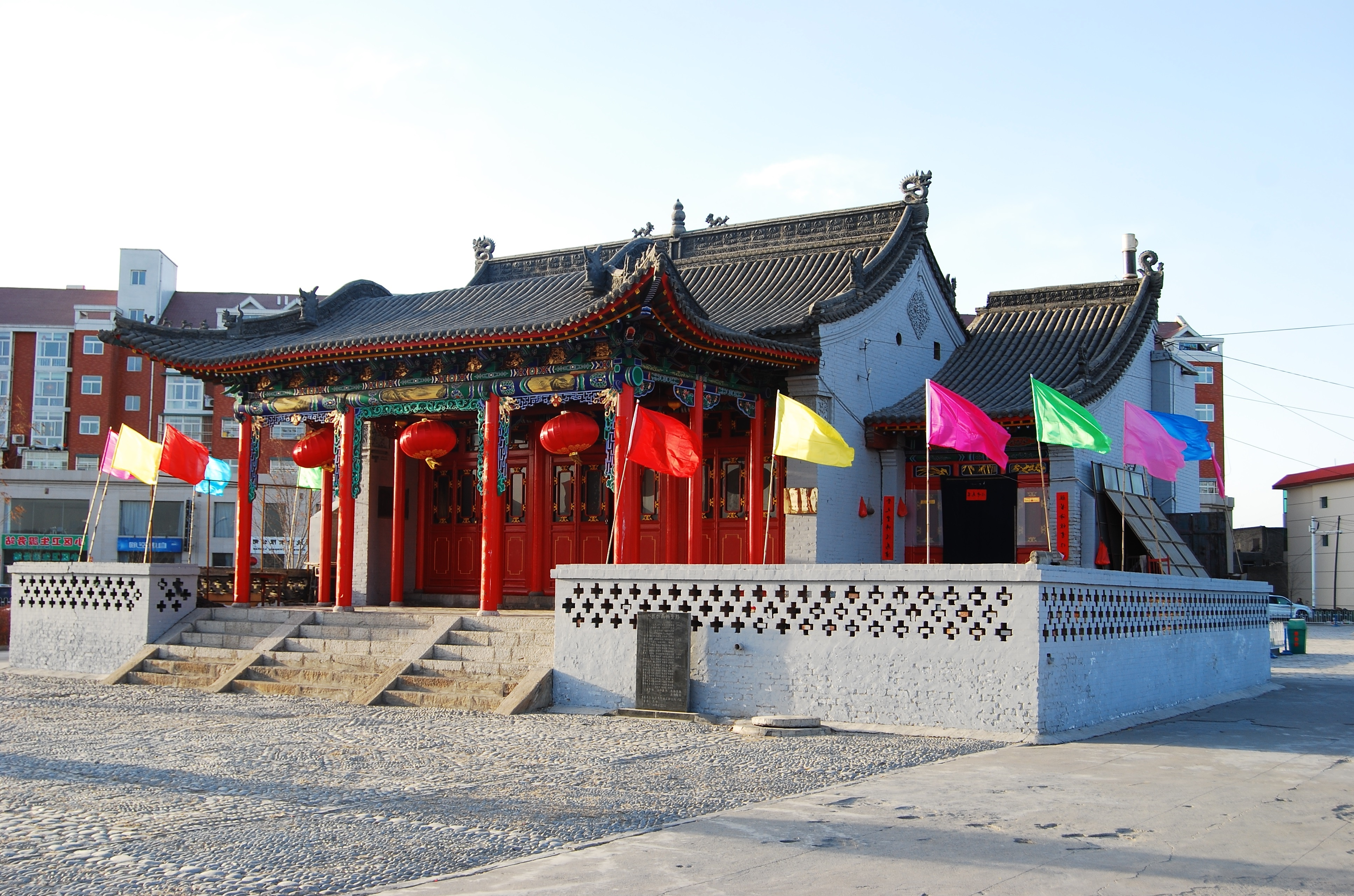
Temple of Hebo ("River Lord"), the god (Heshen, "River God") of the sacred Yellow River, in Hequ, Xinzhou, Shanxi.

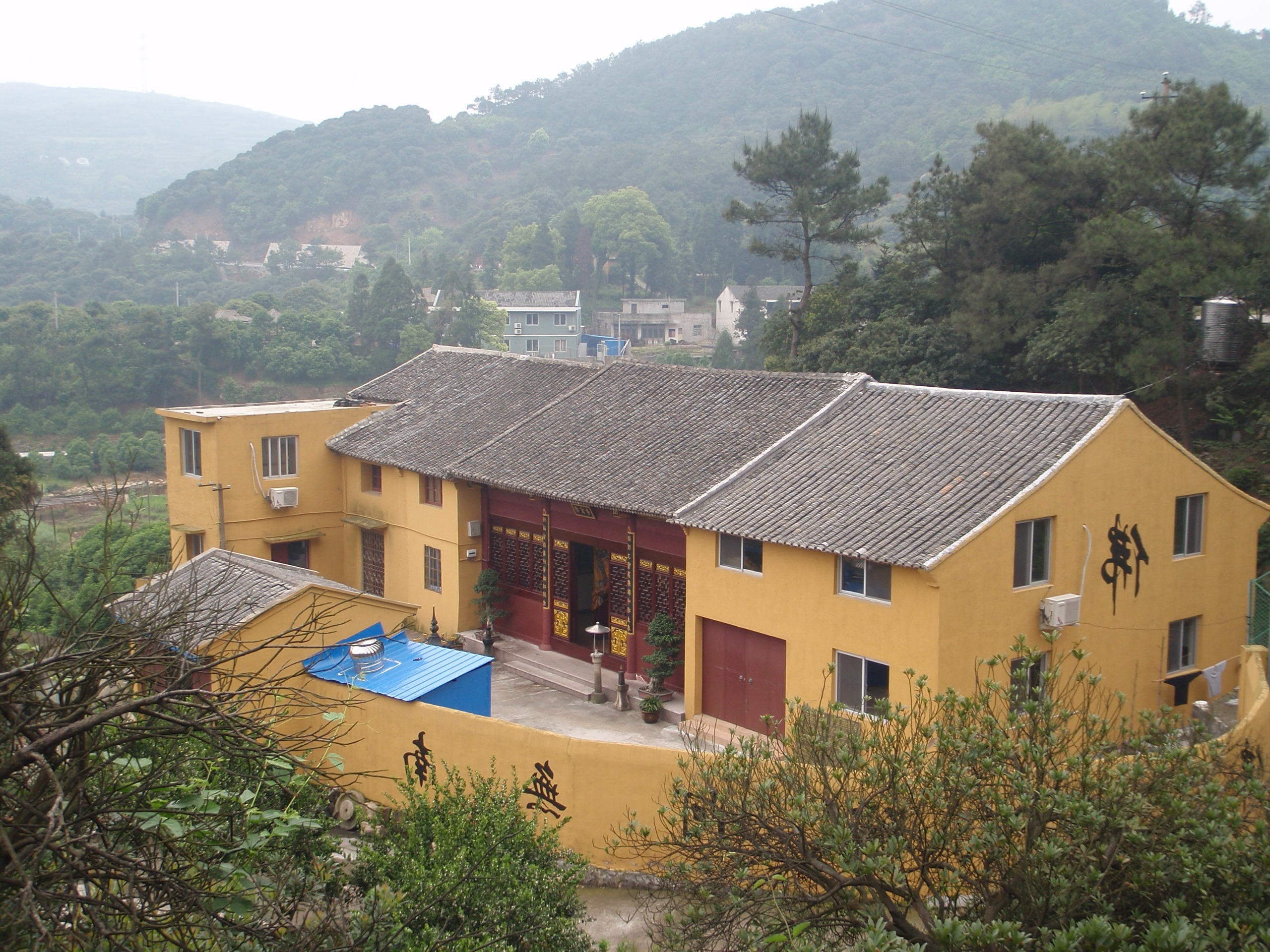
Incense Snow Temple (香雪寺 Xiāngxuěsì), a rural Buddhist convent in Ouhai, Wenzhou, Zhejiang.

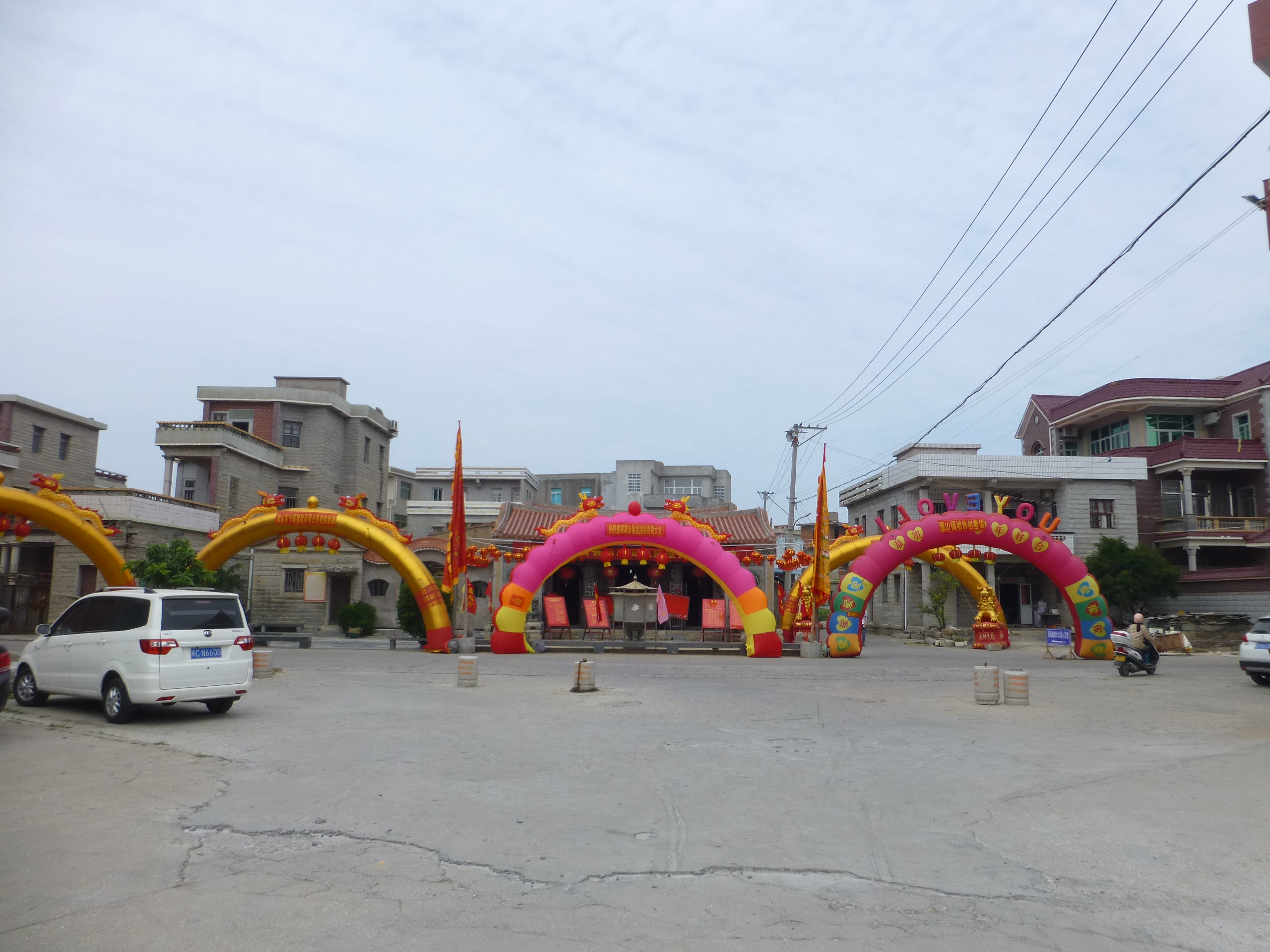
A neighbourhood folk shrine festooned for a festival, in Chongwu, Fujian.

Writing in 2006, academic Phil Zuckerman states that low response rates, non-random samples, and adverse political and cultural climates are persistent problems in surveying religion in China. One scholar concludes that statistics on religious believers in China "cannot be accurate in a real scientific sense", since definitions of "religion" exclude people who do not see themselves as members of a religious organisation but are still "religious" in their daily actions and fundamental beliefs. The forms of Chinese religious expression tend to be syncretic and following one religion does not necessarily mean the rejection or denial of others. In surveys, few people identify as "Taoists" because to most Chinese, this term refers to ordained priests of the religion. Traditionally, the Chinese language has not included a term for a lay follower of Taoism, since the concept of being "Taoist" in this sense is a new word that derives from the Western concept of "religion" as membership in a church institution.

Analysing Chinese traditional religions is further complicated by discrepancies between the terminologies used in Chinese and Western languages. While in current English current usage, "folk religion" broadly refers to all forms of common cults of gods and ancestors, in Chinese usage and in academia these cults have not had an overarching name. By "folk religion" (民間宗教 mínjiān zōngjiào) or "folk beliefs" (民間信仰 mínjiān xìnyǎng) Chinese scholars have usually meant folk religious organisations and salvationist movements (folk religious sects). Furthermore, in the 1990s some of these organisations began to register as branches of the official Taoist Association and therefore to fall under the label of "Taoism". In order to address this terminological confusion, some Chinese intellectuals have proposed the legal recognition and management of the indigenous religion by the state and to adopt the label "Chinese native (or indigenous) religion" (民俗宗教 mínsú zōngjiào) or "Chinese ethnic religion" (民族宗教 mínzú zōngjiào), or other names. (Note: Other names that have been proposed are: Simply "Chinese religion" (中華教 Zhōnghuájiào), viewed as comparable to the usage of "Hinduism"; "Shenxianism" (神仙教 Shénxiānjiào), "religion of gods and immortals", partly inspired to Allan J. A. Elliott's "Shenism".)

There has been much speculation by some Western authors about the number of Christians in China. Chris White, in a 2017 work for the Max Planck Institute for the Study of Religious and Ethnic Diversity of the Max Planck Society, criticises the data and narratives put forward by these authors. He notices that these authors work in the wake of a "Western evangelical bias" reflected in the coverage carried forward by popular media, especially in the United States, which relies upon a "considerable romanticisation" of Chinese Christians. Their data are mostly ungrounded or manipulated through undue interpretations, as "survey results do not support the authors' assertions".

- According to the results of an official census provided in 1995 by the Information Office of the State Council of China, at that time, the Chinese traditional religions were already popular among nearly 1 billion people.
- 2005: a survey of the religiosity of urban Chinese from the five cities of Beijing, Shanghai, Nantong, Wuhan and Baoding, conducted by professor Xinzhong Yao, found that only 5.3% of the analysed population belonged to religious organisations, while 51.8% were non-religious, in that they did not belong to any religious association. Nevertheless, 23.8% of the population regularly worshipped gods and venerated ancestors, 23.1% worshipped Buddha or identified themselves as Buddhists, up to 38.5% had beliefs and practices associated with the folk religions such as feng shui or belief in celestial powers, and only 32.9% were convinced atheists.
- Three surveys conducted respectively in 2005, 2006 and 2007 by the Horizon Research Consultancy Group on a disproportionately urban and suburban sample, found that Buddhists constituted between 11% and 16% of the total population, Christians were between 2% and 4%, and Muslims approximately 1%. The surveys also found that ~60% of the population believed in concepts such as fate and fortune associated to the folk religion.
- 2007: a survey conducted by the East China Normal University taking into account people from different regions of China, concluded that there were approximately 300 million religious believers (≈31% of the total population), of whom the vast majority were ascribable to Buddhism, Taoism and folk religions.
- 2008: a survey conducted in that year by Yu Tao of the University of Oxford with a survey scheme led and supervised by the Center for Chinese Agricultural Policy and the Peking University, analysing the rural populations of the six provinces of Jiangsu, Sichuan, Shaanxi, Jilin, Hebei and Fujian, each representing different geographic and economic regions of China, found that followers of the Chinese folk religions were 31.9% of the analysed population, Buddhists were 10.85%, Christians were 3.93% of whom 3.54% Protestants and 0.39% Catholics, and Taoists were 0.71%. The remaining 53.41% of the population claimed to be not religious.
- 2010: the Chinese Spiritual Life Survey directed by the Purdue University's Center on Religion and Chinese Society concluded that many types of Chinese folk religions and Taoism are practised by possibly hundreds of millions of people; 56.2% of the total population or 754 million people practised Chinese ancestral religion (Note: These numerical results for practitioners of the folk religions exclude those who identified with one of the institutional religions, even the 173 million folk Taoists. p. 34 of Wenzel-Teuber (2011): "The CSLS questioned people on popular religious beliefs and practices as well, and came to the following estimates (excluding those who identified themselves with an institutional religion)."), but only 16% claiming to "believe in the existence" of the ancestor; (Note: However, there is considerable discrepancy between what Chinese and Western cultures intend with the concepts of "belief", "existence" and "practice". The Chinese folk religion is often considered one of "belonging" rather than "believing".) 12.9% or 173 million practised Taoism on a level indistinguishable from the folk religion; 0.9% or 12 million people identified exclusively as Taoists; 13.8% or 185 million identified as Buddhists, of whom 1.3% or 17.3 million had received formal initiation; 2.4% or 33 million identified as Christians, of whom 2.2% or 30 million as Protestants (of whom only 38% baptised in the official churches) and 0.02% or 3 million as Catholics; and an additional 1.7% or 23 million were Muslims.
- 2012: the China Family Panel Studies (CFPS) conducted a survey of 25 of the provinces of China. The provinces surveyed had a Han majority, and did not include the autonomous regions of Inner Mongolia, Ningxia, Tibet and Xinjiang, and of Hong Kong and Macau. The survey found that only ~10% of the population belonged to organised religions; specifically, 6.75% were Buddhists, 2.4% were Christians (of whom 1.89% Protestants and 0.41% Catholics), 0.54% were Taoists, 0.46% were Muslims, and 0.40% declared to belong to other religions. Although ~90% of the population declared that they did not belong to any religion, the survey estimated (according to a 1992 figure) that only 6.3% were atheists while the remaining 81% (≈1 billion people) prayed to or worshipped gods and ancestors in the manner of the folk religion.
- Four surveys conducted respectively in the years 2006, 2008, 2010 and 2011 as part of the Chinese General Social Survey (CGSS) of the Renmin University of China found an average 6.2% of the Chinese identifying as Buddhists, 2.3% as Christians (of whom 2% Protestants and 0.3% Catholics), 2.2% as members of folk religious sects, 1.7% as Muslims, and 0.2% as Taoists.
- 2012–2014: analyses published in a study by Fenggang Yang and Anning Hu found that 55.5% of the adult population (15+) of China, or 578 million people in absolute numbers, believed and practised folk religions, including a 20% who practised ancestor veneration or communal worship of deities, and the rest who practised what Yang and Hu define "individual" folk religions like devotion to specific gods such as Caishen. Members of folk religious sects were not taken into account. Around the same year, Kenneth Dean estimated 680 million people were involved in folk religion, or 51% of the total population. (Note: Scholar Kenneth Dean estimates 680 million people involved in folk temples and rituals. Quote: "According to Dean, 'in the rural sector... if one takes a rough figure of 1000 people per village living in 680,000 administrative villages and assume an average of two or three temples per village, one arrives at a figure of over 680 million villagers involved in some way with well over a million temples and their rituals'.") In the same years, reports of the Chinese government claim that the folk religious sects have about the same number of followers of the five state-sanctioned religions counted together (~13% ≈180 million).
- The CFPS 2014 survey, published in early 2017, found that 15.87% of the Chinese declare to be Buddhists, 5.94% to belong to unspecified other religions, 0.85% to be Taoists, 0.81% to be members of the popular sects, 2.53% to be Christians (2.19% Protestants and 0.34% Catholics) and 0.45% to be Muslims. 73.56% of the population does not belong to the state-sanctioned religions. CFPS 2014 asked the Chinese about belief in a certain conception of divinity rather than membership in a religious group in order to increase its survey accuracy.
- In 2023, according to surveys done by Pew Research, 93% of respondents were formally unaffiliated with any religion. However, in terms of practices, 75% visit family graveyards each year, 47% believe in feng shui, 33% believe in Buddha, 26% burn incense to deities each year and 18% believe in Taoist deities. These are not exclusive beliefs and often these will overlap as the respondents will have multiple beliefs at the same time. For example, of those 33% who believe in Buddha, a significant portion also believe in figures such as Taoist immortals, Jesus Christ, Catholic God and Allah.

Besides the surveys based on fieldwork, estimates using projections have been published by the Pew Research Center as part of its study of the Global Religious Landscape in 2010. This study estimated 21.9% of the population of China believed in folk religions, 18.2% were Buddhists, 5.1% were Christians, 1.8% were Muslims, 0.8% believed in other religions, while unaffiliated people constituted 52.2% of the population. According to the surveys by Phil Zuckerman published on Adherents.com, 59% of the Chinese population was not religious in 1993, and in 2005 between 8% and 14% were atheists (from over 100 to 180 million). A survey held in 2012 by WIN/GIA found that in China the atheists comprise 47% of the population.

According to a 2008 Pew Research survey, almost 60% of Chinese consider religion to be somewhat important or very important in their lives. Data from the World Values Survey shows that Chinese have become more religious from the 1990s through the early 2020s. During that period, the percentage of Chinese Buddhists had the most significant increase, followed by Protestants, with Muslims and Catholics remaining stable.

Yu Tao's survey of the year 2008 provided a detailed analysis of the social characteristics of the religious communities. It found that the proportion of male believers was higher than the average among folk religious people, Taoists, and Catholics, while it was lower than the average among Protestants. The Buddhist community shew a greater balance of male and female believers. Concerning the age of believers, folk religious people and Catholics tended to be younger than the average, while Protestant and Taoist communities were composed of older people. The Christian community was more likely than other religions to have members belonging to the ethnic minorities. The study analysed the proportion of believers who were at the same time members of the local section of the CCP, finding that it was exceptionally high among the Taoists, while the lowest proportion was found among the Protestants. About education and wealth, the survey found that the wealthiest populations were those of Buddhists and especially Catholics, while the poorest was those of the Protestants; Taoists and Catholics were the better educated, while the Protestants were the less educated among the religious communities. These findings confirmed a description by Francis Ching-Wah Yip that the Protestant population was predominantly composed of rural people, illiterate and semi-illiterate people, elderly people, and women, already in the 1990s and early 2000s. A 2017 study of the Christian communities of Wuhan found the same socio-economic characteristics, with the addition that Christians were more likely to suffer from physical and mental illness than the general population.

The China Family Panel Studies' findings for 2012 shew that Buddhists tended to be younger and better educated, while Christians were older and more likely to be illiterate. Furthermore, Buddhists were generally wealthy, while Christians most often belonged to the poorest parts of the population. Henan was found hosting the largest percentage of Christians of any province of China, about 6%. Researchers at Sichuan University found that the proportion of China's Generation Z who believe in religion is slightly higher than the overall proportion of religious believers in China. According to Ji Zhe, Chan Buddhism and individual, non-institutional forms of folk religiosity are particularly successful among the contemporary Chinese youth.

Distribution of religious beliefs

Religions in five Chinese cities (Note: Beijing, Shanghai, Nantong, Wuhan, Baoding.), Yao X. 2005
Religion or belief	%
Cults of gods and ancestors	23.8%
Buddhism or worship of Buddha	23.1%
Believe in fate and divination	38.5%
Believe in feng shui	27.1%
Believe in celestial powers	26.7%
Are not members of religions	51.8%
Are members of religions	5.3%
Are convinced atheists	32.9%

Religions in China, Horizon
Religion	2005	2006	2007
Buddhism	11%	16%	12%
Taoism	<1%	<1%	<1%
Islam	1.2%	0.7%	2.9%
Christianity	4%	1%	2%
—Catholicism	2%	<1%	1%
—Protestantism	2%	1%	1%
Other religion	0.3%	0.1%	0.1%
None	77%	77%	81%
Refused to answer	7%	5%	5%

Religions in China, CSLS 2010
Religion	Number	%
Cults of gods and ancestors	754 million	56.2% (Note: Although a lower 215 million, or 16% said they "believed in the existence" of ancestral spirits.)
Buddhism	185 million	13.8%
Buddhist initiates	17,3 million	1.3%
Taoist folk religions	173 million	12.9%
Taoism	12 million	0.9%
Christianity	33 million	2.4%
—Protestantism	30 million	2.2%
—Catholicism	3 million	0.2%
Islam	23 million	1.7%

Religions in China, CGSS
Religion	2006	2008	2010	2011	Average
Buddhism	7.4%	7.0%	5.5%	5.0%	6.2%
Taoism	0.2%	0.2%	0.2%	0.2%	0.2%
Folk religious sects	2.7%	0.3%	2.9%	1.9%	2.2%
Islam	1.2%	0.7%	2.9%	1.1%	1.7%
Christianity	2.1%	2.2%	2.1%	2.6%	2.3%
—Catholicism	0.3%	0.1%	0.2%	0.4%	0.3%
—Protestantism	1.8%	2.1%	1.9%	2.2%	2.0%
Other religion	0.3%	0.1%	0.1%	0.3%	0.2%
Traditional worship or "not religious"	86.1%	89.5%	86.3%	88.9%	87.2%

Demographic, political and socioeconomic characteristics of religious believers in six provinces, (Note: The populations surveyed were those of the provinces of Jiangsu, Sichuan, Shaanxi, Jilin, Hebei and Fujian.) Yu Tao—CCAP (Note: Center for Chinese Agricultural Policy)—PU 2008
Religious community	% of population	% male	Average age in years	% agricultural households	% ethnic minority	% married	% Communist Party members	Average education in years	Annual family income in yuan
Traditional folk religion	31.09	64.8	46.46	96.4	1.1	94.6	9.8	5.94	29.772
Buddhism	10.85	54.4	49.44	95.8	0.0	92.1	9.8	5.88	38.911
Protestantism	3.54	47.7	49.66	89.2	4.6	96.9	4.6	5.83	24.168
Taoism	0.71	64.3	50.50	92.9	0.0	100	21.4	6.29	30.630
Catholicism	0.39	66.7	46.33	91.7	8.3	91.7	8.3	7.50	46.010
All religious	46.59	61.6	49.45	96.2	1.2	93.8	9.6	5.94	30.816
All non-religious	53.41	64.6	50.62	96.3	5.5	93.3	15.0	6.40	26.448

Religions by age group, CFPS 2012
Religion	<30	30–40	40–50	50–60	60+
Buddhism	6.6%	7.9%	5.8%	6.0%	6.0%
Taoism	0.3%	0.4%	0.2%	0.4%	0.4%
Islam	0.3%	0.8%	0.5%	0.8%	0.4%
Christianity	1.5%	1.2%	2.5%	2.3%	2.9%
—Catholicism	0.3%	0.1%	0.6%	0.3%	0.3%
—Protestantism	1.2%	1.1%	1.9%	2.0%	2.6%
Other religion	0.2%	0.5%	0.7%	0.4%	0.7%
Traditional worship or "not religious"	91.0%	89.1%	90.3%	90.2%	89.6%

Religious self-identification of university students in Beijing (2011)
1. Not religious or other (80.3%)
2. Buddhism (7.00%)
3. Confucianism (4.00%)
4. Christianity (3.90%)
5. Taoism (2.70%)
6. Islam (2.10%)
Religious self-identification of participants of the cultural nationalist movement in the mainland (2011)
1. Confucianism (59.6%)
2. Buddhism (26.3%)
3. Taoism (4.10%)
4. Christianity (Note: Mostly Catholicism (0.6%), while nobody declared affiliation with Protestantism (0%).) (0.60%)
5. Don't know (9.40%)

=== Geographic distribution ===
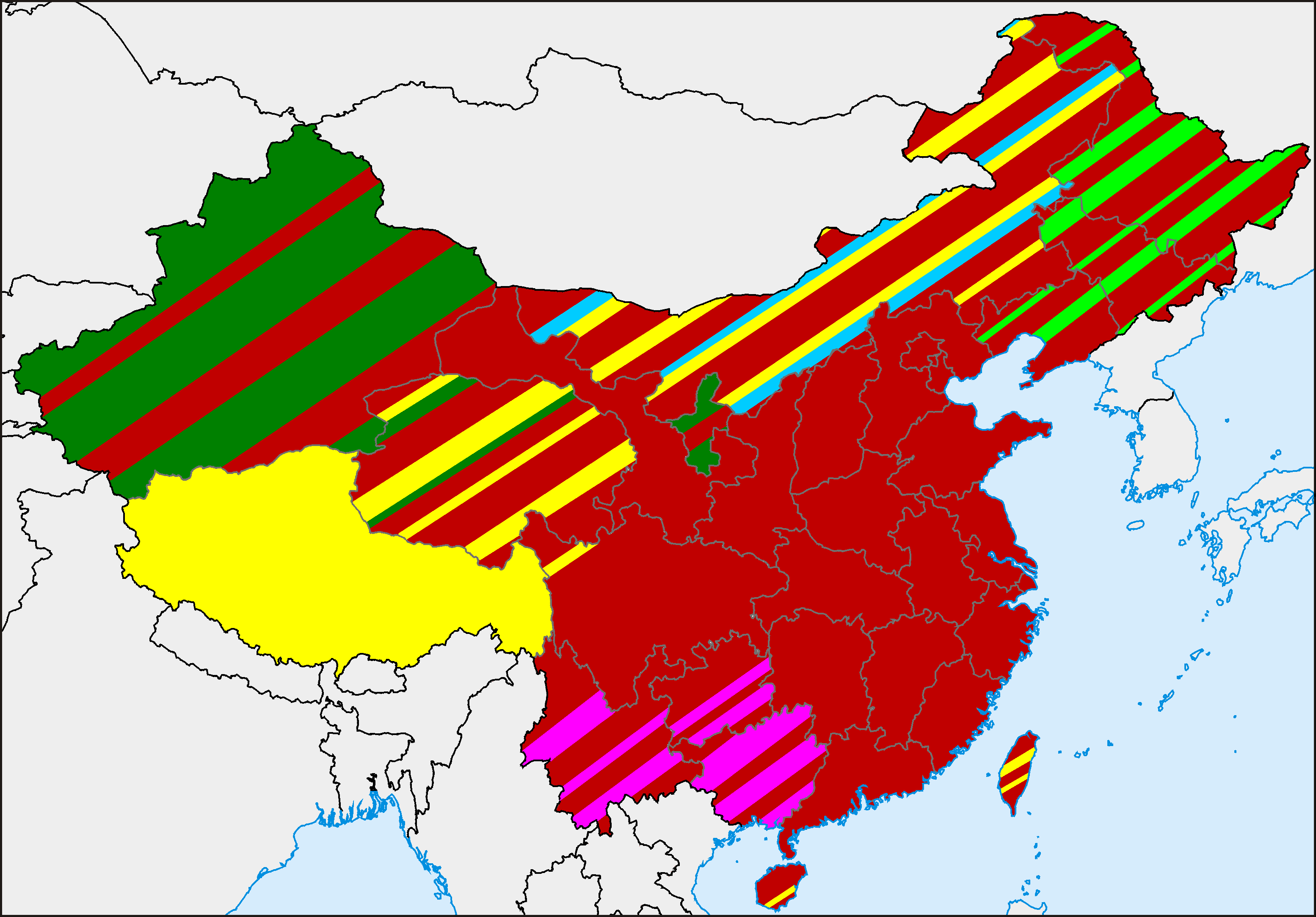
An attempt to represent geographic distribution of religions in China. ■ Chinese folk religion (and Confucianism, Taoism, and groups of Chinese Buddhism) ■ Buddhism tout court ■ Islam ■ Ethnic minorities' indigenous religions ■ Mongolian folk religion ■ Northeast China folk religion influenced by Tungus and Manchu shamanism, widespread Shanrendao

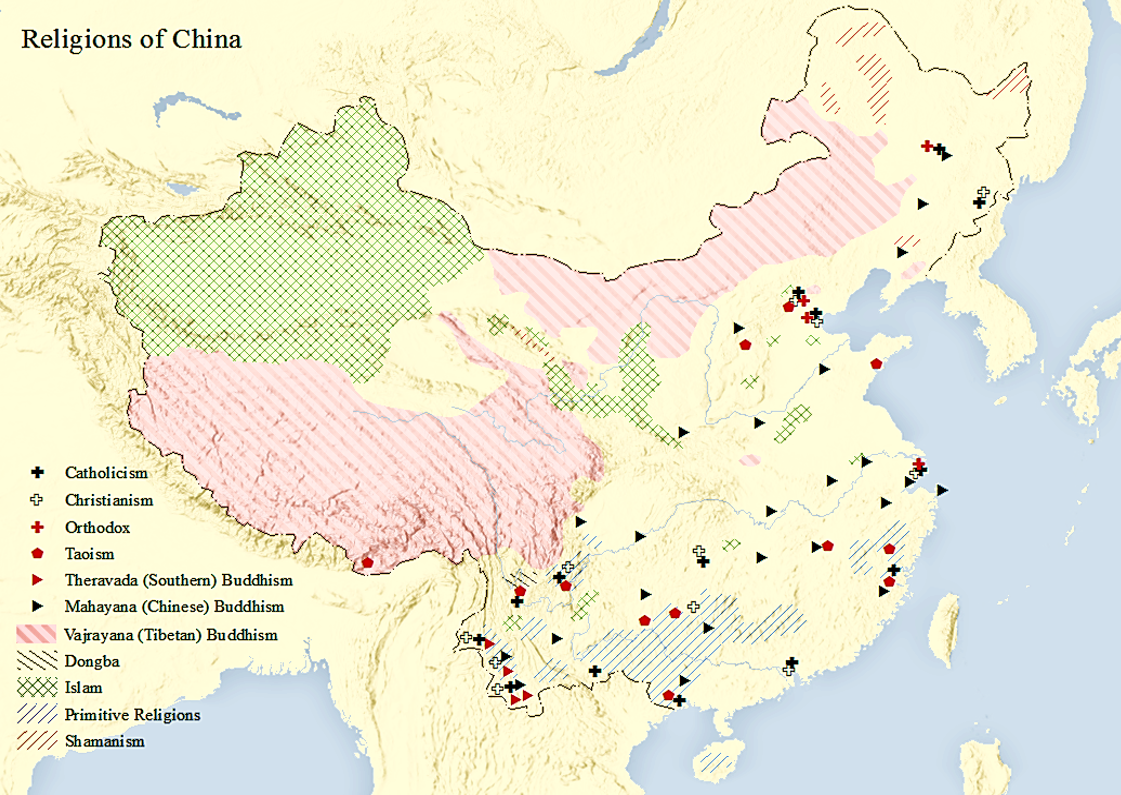
Geographic distributions and major communities of religions in China.

The varieties of Chinese religion are spread across the map of China in different degrees. Southern provinces have experienced the most evident revival of Chinese folk religion, although it is present all over China in a great variety of forms, intertwined with Taoism, fashi orders, Confucianism, Nuo rituals, shamanism and other religious currents. Quanzhen Taoism is mostly present in the north, while Sichuan is the area where Tianshi Taoism developed and the early Celestial Masters had their main seat. Along the southeastern coast, Taoism reportedly dominates the ritual activity of popular religion, both in registered and unregistered forms (Zhengyi Taoism and unrecognized fashi orders). Since the 1990s, Taoism has been well-developed in the area.

Many scholars see "north Chinese religion" as distinct from practices in the south. The folk religion of southern and southeastern provinces is primarily focused on the lineages and their churches (zōngzú xiéhuì 宗族协会) and the worship of ancestor-gods. The folk religion of central-northern China (North China Plain), otherwise, is focused on the communal worship of tutelary deities of creation and nature as identity symbols, by villages populated by families of different surnames, structured into "communities of the god(s)" (shénshè 神社, or huì 会, "association"), which organise temple ceremonies (miaohui 庙会), involving processions and pilgrimages, and led by indigenous ritual masters (fashi) who are often hereditary and linked to secular authority. (Note: Overmyer (2009, p. 73), says that from the late 19th to the 20th century few professional priests (i.e. licensed Taoists) were involved in local religion in the central and northern provinces of China, and discusses various types of folk ritual specialists including: the yuehu 樂戶, the zhuli 主禮 (p. 74), the shenjia 神家 ("godly families", hereditary specialists of gods and their rites; p. 77), then (p. 179) the yinyang or fengshui masters (as "[...] folk Zhengyi Daoists of the Lingbao scriptural tradition, living as ordinary peasants. They earn their living both as a group from performing public rituals, and individually [...] by doing geomancy and calendrical consultations for fengshui and auspicious days"; quoting: S. Jones (2007), Ritual and Music of North China: Shawm Bands in Shanxi). He also describes shamans or media known by different names: mapi 馬裨, wupo 巫婆, shen momo 神嬤嬤 or shen han 神漢 (p. 87); xingdao de 香道的 ("practitioners of the incense way"; p. 85); village xiangtou 香頭 ("incense heads"; p. 86); matong 馬童 (the same as southern jitong), either wushen 巫神 (possessed by gods) or shenguan 神官 (possessed by immortals; pp. 88–89); or "godly sages" (shensheng 神聖; p. 91). Further (p. 76), he discusses, for example, the sai 賽, ceremonies of thanksgiving to the gods in Shanxi with roots in the Song era, whose leaders very often corresponded to local political authorities. This pattern continues today with former village Communist Party secretaries elected as temple association bosses (p. 83). He concludes (p. 92): "In sum, since at least the early twentieth century the majority of local ritual leaders in north China have been products of their own or nearby communities. They have special skills in organization, ritual performance or interaction with the gods, but none are full-time ritual specialists; they have all 'kept their day jobs'! As such they are exemplars of ordinary people organizing and carrying out their own cultural traditions, persistent traditions with their own structure, functions and logic that deserve to be understood as such.") Northern and southern folk religions also have a different pantheon, of which the northern one is composed of more ancient gods of Chinese mythology.

Folk religious movements of salvation have historically been more successful in the central plains and in the northeastern provinces than in southern China, and central-northern popular religion shares characteristics of some of the sects, such as the great importance given to mother goddess worship and shamanism, as well as their scriptural transmission. Also Confucian churches and jiaohua organizations have historically found much resonance among the population of the northeast; in the 1930s the Universal Church of the Way and its Virtue alone aggregated at least 25% of the population of the state of Manchuria and contemporary Shandong has been analysed as an area of rapid growth of folk Confucian groups.

Goossaert talks of this distinction, although recognizing it as an oversimplification, between a "Taoist south" and a "village-religion/Confucian centre-north", with the northern context also characterized by important orders of "folk Taoist" ritual masters, one order being that of the yinyangsheng (阴阳生 yīnyángshēng), and sectarian traditions, and also by a low influence of Buddhism and official Taoism.

The folk religion of northeast China has unique characteristics deriving from the interaction of Han religion with Tungus and Manchu shamanisms; these include the practice of chūmǎxiān (出马仙 "riding for the immortals"), the worship of Fox Gods and other zoomorphic deities, and of the Great Lord of the Three Foxes (胡三太爷 Húsān Tàiyé) and the Great Lady of the Three Foxes (胡三太奶 Húsān Tàinǎi) usually positioned at the head of pantheons. Otherwise, in the religious context of Inner Mongolia there has been a significant integration of Han Chinese into the traditional folk religion of the region.

Across China, Han religion has even adopted deities from Tibetan folk religion, especially wealth gods. In Tibet, across broader western China, and in Inner Mongolia, there has been a growth of the cult of Gesar with the explicit support of the Chinese government, Gesar being a cross-ethnic Han-Tibetan, Mongol and Manchu deity—the Han identify him as an aspect of the god of war analogically with Guandi—and culture hero whose mythology is embodied in a culturally important epic poem.

The Han Chinese schools of Buddhism are mostly practiced in the eastern part of the country. On the other hand, Tibetan Buddhism is the dominant religion in Tibet, and significantly present in other westernmost provinces where ethnic Tibetans constitute a significant part of the population, and has a strong influence in Inner Mongolia in the north. The Tibetan tradition has also been gaining a growing influence among the Han Chinese.

Christians are especially concentrated in the three provinces of Henan, Anhui and Zhejiang. The latter two provinces were in the area affected by the Taiping Rebellion, and Zhejiang along with Henan were hubs of the intense Protestant missionary activity in the 19th and early 20th century. Christianity has been practiced in Hong Kong since 1841. As of 2010 there are 843,000 Christians in Hong Kong (11.8% of the total population). As of 2010 approximately 5% of the population of Macau self-identifies as Christian, predominantly Catholic.

Islam is the majority religion in areas inhabited by the Hui Muslims, particularly the province of Ningxia, and in the province of Xinjiang that is inhabited by the Uyghurs. Many ethnic minority groups in China follow their own traditional ethnic religions: Benzhuism of the Bai, Bimoism of the Yi, Bön of the Tibetans, Dongbaism of the Nakhi, Miao folk religion, Qiang folk religion, Yao folk religion, Zhuang folk religion, Mongolian shamanism or Tengerism, and Manchu shamanism among Manchus.

==== Religions by province ====
Historical record and contemporary scholarly fieldwork testify certain central and northern provinces of China as hotbeds of folk religious sects and Confucian religious groups.

- Hebei: Fieldwork by Thomas David Dubois testifies the dominance of folk religious movements, specifically the Church of the Heaven and the Earth and the Church of the Highest Supreme, since their "energetic revival since the 1970s" (p. 13), in the religious life of the counties of Hebei. Religious life in rural Hebei is also characterized by a type of organization called the benevolent churches and the salvationist movement known as Zailiism has returned active since the 1990s.
- Henan: According to Heberer and Jakobi (2000) Henan has been for centuries a hub of folk religious sects (p. 7) that constitute significant focuses of the religious life of the province. Sects present in the region include the Baguadao or Tianli ("Order of Heaven") sect, the Dadaohui, the Tianxianmiaodao, the Yiguandao, and many others. Henan also has a strong popular Confucian orientation (p. 5).
- Northeast China: According to official records by the then-government, the Universal Church of the Way and its Virtue or Morality Society had 8 million members in Manchuria, or northeast China in the 1930s, making up about 25% of the total population of the area (the state of Manchuria also included the eastern end of modern-day Inner Mongolia). Folk religious movements of a Confucian nature, or Confucian churches, were in fact very successful in the northeast.
- Shandong: The province is traditionally a stronghold of Confucianism and is the area of origin of many folk religious sects and Confucian churches of the modern period, including the Universal Church of the Way and its Virtue, the Way of the Return to the One (皈依道 Guīyīdào), the Way of Unity (一貫道 Yīguàndào), and others. Alex Payette (2016) testifies the rapid growth of Confucian groups in the province in the 2010s.

According to the Chinese General Social Survey of 2012, about 2.2% of the total population of China (around 30 million people) claims membership in the folk religious sects, which have likely maintained their historical dominance in central-northern and northeastern China.

Religions in each province, major city, and autonomous region of China according to the latest available data (Note: The statistics for Chinese ancestorism, that is the worship of ancestor-gods within the lineage system, are from the Chinese Spiritual Life Survey of 2010. The statistics for Buddhism and Christianity are from the China Family Panel Studies survey of 2012. The statistics for Islam are from a survey conducted in 2010. The populations of Chinese ancestorism and Buddhism may overlap, even with the large remaining parts of the population whose belief is not documented in the table. The latter, the uncharted population, may practise other forms of Chinese religion, such as the worship of gods, Taoism, Confucianism, and folk salvationisms, or may be atheist. According to the CFPS 2012, only 6.3% of the Chinese were irreligious in the sense of "atheism", while the rest practised the worship of gods and ancestors.)
Province	Chinese ancestorism	Buddhism	Christianity	Islam
Fujian	31.31%	40.40%	3.97%	0.32%
Zhejiang	23.02%	23.99%	3.89%	<0.2%
Guangxi	40.48%	10.23%	0.15%	<0.2%
Guangdong	43.71%	5.18%	0.68%	<0.2%
Yunnan	32.22%	13.06%	0.68%	1.52%
Guizhou	31.18%	1.86%	0.49%	0.48%
Jiangsu	16.67%	14.17%	2.67%	<0.2%
Jiangxi	24.05%	7.96%	0.66%	<0.2%
Shandong	25.28%	2.90%	1.54%	0.55%
Hunan	20.19%	2.44%	0.49%	<0.2%
Shanxi	15.61%	3.65%	1.55%	<0.2%
Henan	7.94%	5.52%	4.95%	1.05%
Jilin	7.73%	8.23%	3.26%	<0.2%
Anhui	4.64%	7.83%	4.32%	0.58%
Gansu	3.51%	5.80%	0.28%	7.00%
Heilongjiang	7.73%	4.39%	3.63%	0.35%
Shaanxi	7.58%	6.35%	1.66%	0.4%
Liaoning	7.73%	5.31%	2.00%	0.64%
Sichuan	10.6%	2.06%	0.30%	<0.2%
Hubei	6.5%	2.09%	1.71%	<0.2%
Hebei	5.52%	1.59%	1.13%	0.82%
Hainan	–	–	0.48%	<0.2%
Beijing	–	11.2%	0.78%	1.76%
Chongqing	26.63%	0.85%	0.28%	<0.2%
Shanghai	–	10.30%	1.88%	0.36%
Tianjin	–	–	0.43%	<0.2%
Tibet	19.4%	~80%	0.10%	0.40%
Xinjiang	–	–	1.0%	58%
Ningxia	–	–	1.17%	34%
Qinghai	–	–	0.76%	17.51%
Inner Mongolia	2.36%	12.1%	2.0%	0.91%
China	16%	15%	2.5%	2%

== Cosmological principles ==
=== Concepts of religion, tradition, and doctrine ===
"Chief Star pointing the Dipper" 魁星点斗 Kuíxīng diǎn Dòu
- Kuixing ("Chief Star"), the god of exams, composed of the characters describing the four Confucian virtues (Sìde 四德), standing on the head of the ao (鰲) turtle (an expression for coming first in the examinations), and pointing at the Big Dipper (斗)". (Note: The image is a good synthesis of the basic virtues of Chinese religion and Confucian ethics, that is to say "to move and act according to the harmony of Heaven". The Big Dipper or Great Chariot in Chinese culture (as in other traditional cultures) is a symbol of the axis mundi, Heaven in its way of manifestation, order of creation (li or Tao). The symbol, also called the Gate of Heaven (天门 Tiānmén), is widely used in esoteric and mystical literature. For example, an excerpt from Shangqing Taoism's texts: "Life and death, separation and convergence, all derive from the seven stars. Thus when the Big Dipper impinges on someone, he dies, and when it moves, he lives. That is why the seven stars are Heaven's chancellor, the yamen where the gate is opened to give life.")

There was no term that corresponded to "religion" in Classical Chinese. The combination of zong (宗) and jiao (教), which now corresponds to "religion", was in circulation since the Tang dynasty in Chan circles to define the Buddhist doctrine. It was chosen to translate the Western concept "religion" only at the end of the 19th century, when Chinese intellectuals adopted the Japanese term shūkyō (pronounced zongjiao in Chinese). Under the influence of Western rationalism and later Marxism, what most of the Chinese today mean as zōngjiào are "organised doctrines", that is "superstructures consisting of superstitions, dogmas, rituals and institutions". Most academics in China use the term "religion" (zongjiao) to include formal institutions, specific beliefs, a clergy, and sacred texts, while Western scholars tend to use the term more loosely.

Zōng (宗 "ancestor", "model", "mode", "master", "pattern", but also "purpose") implies that the understanding of the ultimate derives from the transformed figure of great ancestors or progenitors, who continue to support—and correspondingly rely on—their descendants, in a mutual exchange of benefit. Jiào (教 "teaching") is connected to filial piety (xiao), as it implies the transmission of knowledge from the elders to the youth and of support from the youth to the elders.

Understanding religion primarily as an ancestral tradition, the Chinese have a relationship with the divine that functions socially, politically as well as spiritually. The Chinese concept of "religion" draws the divine near to the human world. Because "religion" refers to the bond between the human and the divine, there is always a danger that this bond be broken. However, the term zōngjiào—instead of separation—emphasises communication, correspondence and mutuality between the ancestor and the descendant, the master and the disciple, and between the Way (Tao, the way of the divine in nature) and its ways. Ancestors are the mediators of Heaven. In other words, to the Chinese, the supreme principle is manifested and embodied by the chief gods of each phenomenon and of each human kin, making the worship of the highest God possible even in each ancestral temple.

Chinese concepts of religion differ from concepts in Judaism and Christianity, says scholar Julia Ching, which were "religions of the fathers", that is, patriarchal religions, whereas Chinese religion was not only "a patriarchal religion but also an ancestral religion". Israel believed in the "God of its fathers, but not its divinised fathers". Among the ancient Chinese, the God of the Zhou dynasty appeared to have been an ancestor of the ruling house. "The belief in Tian (Heaven) as the great ancestral spirit differed from the Judeo-Christian, and later Islamic belief in a creator God". Early Christianity's Church Fathers pointed out that the First Commandment injunction, "thou shalt have no other gods before me", reserved all worship for one God, and that prayers therefore might not be offered to the dead, even though Judaism, Christianity, and Islam did encourage prayers for the dead. Unlike the Abrahamic traditions in which living beings are created by God out of nothing, in Chinese religions all living beings descend from beings that existed before. These ancestors are the roots of current and future beings. They continue to live in the lineage which they begot, and are cultivated as models and exemplars by their descendants.

The mutual support of elders and youth is needed for the continuity of the ancestral tradition, that is communicated from generation to generation. With an understanding of religion as teaching and education, the Chinese have a staunch confidence in the human capacity of transformation and perfection, enlightenment or immortality. In the Chinese religions, humans are confirmed and reconfirmed with the ability to improve themselves, in a positive attitude towards eternity. Hans Küng defined Chinese religions as the "religions of wisdom", thereby distinguishing them from the "religions of prophecy" (Judaism, Christianity and Islam) and from the "religions of mysticism" (Hinduism, Jainism and Buddhism).

The cults of gods and ancestors that in recent (originally Western) literature have been classified as "Chinese popular religion", traditionally neither have a common name nor are considered zōngjiào ("doctrines"). The lack of an overarching name conceptualising Chinese local and indigenous cults has led to some confusion in the terminology employed in scholarly literature. In Chinese, with the terms usually translated in English as "folk religion" (i.e. 民間宗教 mínjiān zōngjiào) or "folk faith" (i.e. 民間信仰 mínjiān xìnyǎng) they generally refer to the folk religious movements of salvation, and not to the local and indigenous cults of gods and ancestors. To resolve this issue, some Chinese intellectuals have proposed to formally adopt "Chinese native religion" or "Chinese indigenous religion" (i.e. 民俗宗教 mínsú zōngjiào), or "Chinese ethnic religion" (i.e. 民族宗教 mínzú zōngjiào), or even "Chinese religion" (中華教 Zhōnghuájiào) and "Shenxianism" (神仙教 Shénxiānjiào), as single names for the local indigenous cults of China.

=== Centring and ancestrality ===
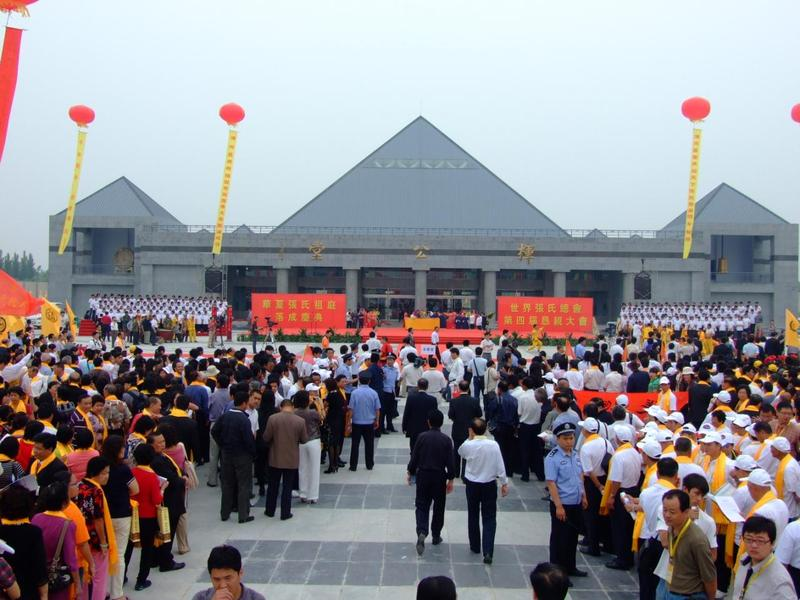
Worship at the Great Temple of Lord Zhang Hui (张挥公大殿 Zhāng Huī gōng dàdiàn), the cathedral ancestral shrine of the Zhang lineage corporation, at their ancestral home in Qinghe, Hebei.

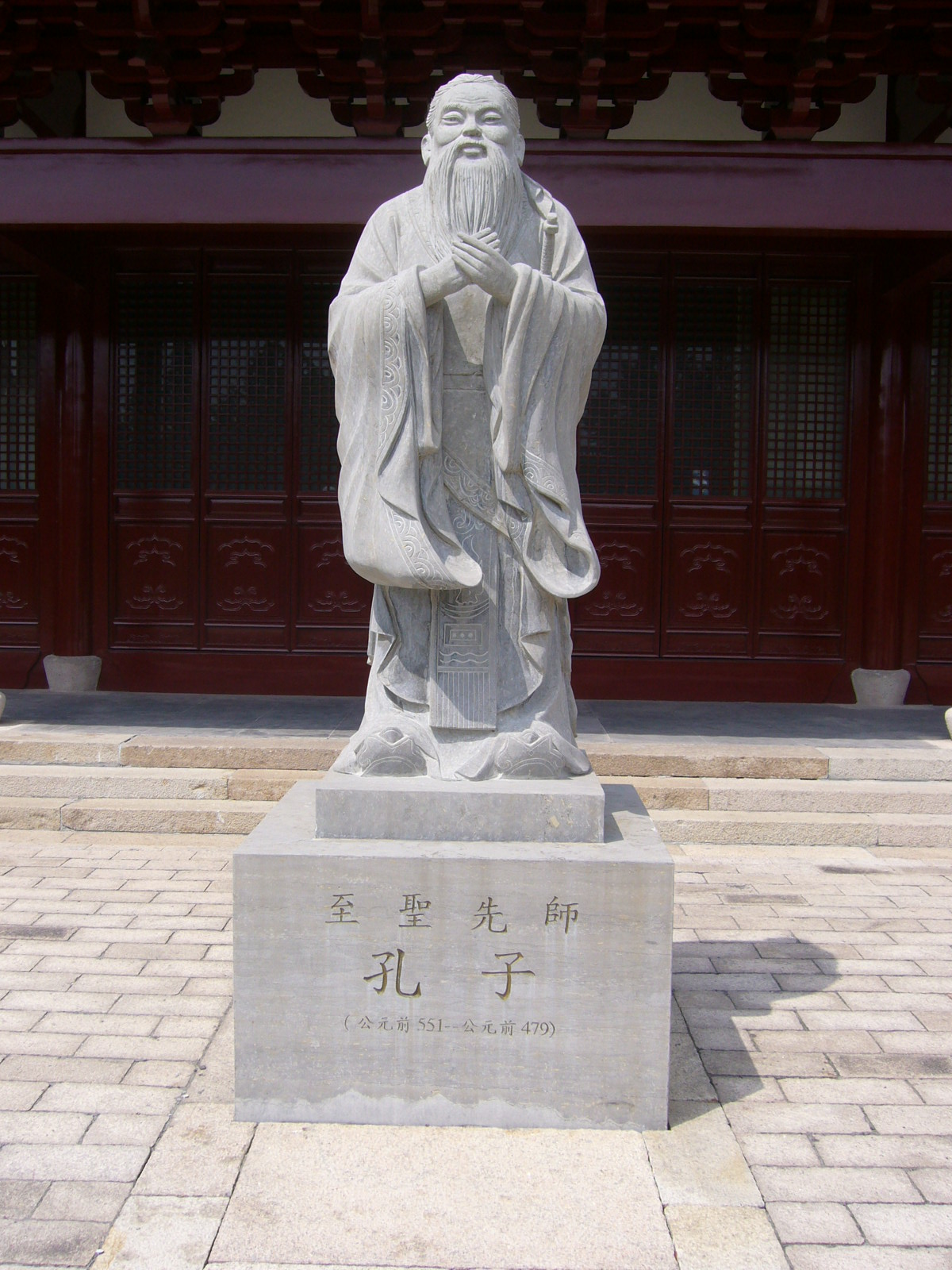
Statue of Confucius at a temple in Chongming, Shanghai.

Han Chinese culture embodies a concept of religion that differs from the one that is common in the Abrahamic traditions, which are based on the belief in an omnipotent God who exists outside the world and human race and has complete power over them. Chinese religions, in general, do not place as much emphasis as Christianity does on exclusivity and doctrine.

Han Chinese culture is marked by a "harmonious holism" in which religious expression is syncretic and religious systems encompass elements that grow, change, and transform but remain within an organic whole. The performance of rites (礼 lǐ) is the key characteristic of common Chinese religion, which scholars see as going back to Neolithic times. According to the scholar Stephan Feuchtwang, rites are conceived as "what makes the invisible visible", making possible for humans to cultivate the underlying order of nature. Correctly performed rituals move society in alignment with earthly and heavenly (astral) forces, establishing the harmony of the three realms—Heaven, Earth and humanity. This practice is defined as "centring" (央 yāng or 中 zhōng). Rituals may be performed by government officials, family elders, popular ritual masters and Taoists, the latter cultivating local gods to centre the forces of the universe upon a particular locality. Among all things of creation, humans themselves are "central" because they have the ability to cultivate and centre natural forces.

This primordial sense of ritual united the moral and the religious and drew no boundaries between family, social, and political life. From earliest times, the Chinese tended to be all-embracing rather than to treat different religious traditions as separate and independent. The scholar Xinzhong Yao argues that the term "Chinese religion", therefore, does not imply that there is only one religious system, but that the "different ways of believing and practicing... are rooted in and can be defined by culturally common themes and features", and that "different religious streams and strands have formed a culturally unitary single tradition" in which basic concepts and practices are related.

The continuity of Chinese civilisation across thousands of years and thousands of square miles is made possible through China's religious traditions understood as systems of knowledge transmission. A worthy Chinese is expected to remember a vast amount of information from the past, and to draw on this past to form his moral reasoning. The remembrance of the past and of ancestors is important for individuals and groups. The identities of descent-based groups are molded by stories, written genealogies (zupu, "books of ancestors"), temple activities, and village theatre which link them to history.

This reliance on group memory is the foundation of the Chinese practice of ancestor worship (拜祖 bàizǔ or 敬祖 jìngzǔ) which dates back to prehistory, and is the focal aspect of Chinese religion. Defined as "the essential religion of the Chinese", ancestor worship is the means of memory and therefore of the cultural vitality of the entire Chinese civilisation. Rites, symbols, objects and ideas construct and transmit group and individual identities. Rituals and sacrifices are employed not only to seek blessing from the ancestors, but also to create a communal and educational religious environment in which people are firmly linked with a glorified history. Ancestors are evoked as gods and kept alive in these ceremonies to bring good luck and protect from evil forces and ghosts.

The two major festivals involving ancestor worship are the Qingming Festival and the Double Ninth Festival, but veneration of ancestors is held in many other ceremonies, including weddings, funerals, and triad initiations. Worshippers generally offer prayers through a jingxiang rite, with offerings of food, light incense and candles, and burning joss paper. These activities are typically conducted at the site of ancestral graves or tombs, at an ancestral temple, or at a household shrine.

A practice developed in the Chinese folk religion of post-Maoist China, that started in the 1990s from the Confucian temples managed by the Kong kin (the lineage of the descendants of Confucius himself), is the representation of ancestors in ancestral shrines no longer just through tablets with their names, but through statues. Statuary effigies were previously exclusively used for Buddhist bodhisattva and Taoist gods.

Lineage cults of the founders of surnames and kins are religious microcosms which are part of a larger organism, that is the cults of the ancestor-gods of regional and ethnic groups, which in turn are part of a further macrocosm, the cults of virtuous historical figures that have had an important impact in the history of China, notable examples including Confucius, Guandi, or Huangdi, Yandi and Chiyou, the latter three considered ancestor-gods of the Han Chinese (Huangdi and Yandi) and of western minority ethnicities and foreigners (Chiyou). This hierarchy proceeds up to the gods of the cosmos, the Earth and Heaven itself. In other words, ancestors are regarded as the equivalent of Heaven within human society, and are therefore the means connecting back to Heaven as the "utmost ancestral father" (曾祖父 zēngzǔfù).

=== Theological and cosmological discourse ===
Tian 天 ("Heaven" or "Sky") is the idea of absolute principle or God manifesting as the northern culmen and starry vault of the skies in Chinese common religion and philosophy. Various interpretations have been elaborated by Confucians, Taoists, and other schools of thought. A popular representation of Heaven is the Jade Deity (玉帝 Yùdì) or Jade Emperor (玉皇 Yùhuáng). (Note: The characters yu 玉 (jade), huang 皇 ("emperor, sovereign, august"), wang 王 ("king"), as well as others pertaining to the same semantic field, have a common denominator in the concepts of gong 工 ("work, art, craft, artisan, bladed weapon, square and compass; gnomon, interpreter") and wu 巫 ("shaman, medium") in its archaic form ☩, with the same meaning of wan 卍 (swastika, ten thousand things, all being, universe). A king is a man or an entity who is able to merge himself with the axis mundi, the centre of the universe, bringing its order into reality. The ancient kings or emperors of the Chinese civilisation were shamans or priests, that is to say mediators of the divine rule.) Tian is defined in many ways, with many names, other well-known ones being Tàidì 太帝 (the "Great Deity") and Shàngdì 上帝 (the "Highest Deity") or simply Dì 帝 ("Deity"). (Note: Tian, besides Taidi ("Great Deity") and Shangdi ("Highest Deity"), Yudi ("Jade Deity"), and Taiyi ("Great Oneness"), identified as the ladle of the Big Dipper (Great Chariot), is defined by many other names attested in the Chinese literary tradition. Tian is both transcendent and immanent, manifesting in the three forms of dominance, destiny and nature. In the Wujing Yiyi (《五經異義》, "Different Meanings in the Five Classics"), Xu Shen explains that the designation of Heaven is quintuple:)

- Huáng Tiān 皇天 —"Yellow Heaven" or "Shining Heaven", when it is venerated as the lord of creation;
- Hào Tiān 昊天—"Vast Heaven", with regard to the vastness of its vital breath (qi);
- Mín Tiān 旻天—"Compassionate Heaven", for it hears and corresponds with justice to the all-under-Heaven;
- Shàng Tiān 上天—"Highest Heaven" or "First Heaven", for it is the primordial being supervising all-under-Heaven;
- Cāng Tiān 苍天—"Deep-Green Heaven", for it being unfathomably deep.

Di 帝 is rendered as "deity" or "emperor" and describes a divine principle that exerts a fatherly dominance over what it produces. Tengri is the equivalent of Tian in Altaic shamanic religions. By the words of Stephan Feuchtwang, in Chinese cosmology "the universe creates itself out of a primary chaos of material energy" (hundun 混沌 and qi), organising as the polarity of yin and yang which characterises any thing and life. Creation is therefore a continuous ordering; it is not a creation ex nihilo. Yin and yang are the invisible and the visible, the receptive and the active, the unshaped and the shaped; they characterise the yearly cycle (winter and summer), the landscape (shady and bright), the sexes (female and male), and even sociopolitical history (disorder and order).

While Confucian theology emphasises the need to realise the starry order of the Heaven in human society, Taoist theology emphasises the Tao 道 ("Way"), which in one word denotes both the source and its spontaneous arising in nature. In the Confucian text "On Rectification" (Zheng lun) of the Xunzi, the God of Heaven is discussed as an active power setting in motion creation. In the tradition of New Text Confucianism, Confucius is regarded as a "throne-less king" of the God of Heaven and a savior of the world. Otherwise, the school of the Old Texts regards Confucius as a sage who gave a new interpretation to the tradition from previous great dynasties. Neo-Confucian thinkers such as Zhu Xi (1130–1200) developed the idea of Lǐ 理, the "reason", "order" of Heaven, which unfolds in the polarity of yin and yang. In Taoist theology, the God of Heaven is discussed as the Jade Purity (玉清 Yùqīng), the "Heavenly Honourable of the First Beginning" (元始天尊 Yuánshǐ Tiānzūn), the central of the Three Pure Ones—who represent the centre of the universe and its two modalities of manifestation. Even Chinese Buddhism adapted to common Chinese cosmology by paralleling its concept of a triune supreme with Shakyamuni, Amithaba and Maitreya representing respectively enlightenment, salvation and post-apocalyptic paradise, while the Tathātā (真如 zhēnrú, "suchness") is generally identified as the supreme being itself.

In Chinese religion, Tian is both transcendent and immanent, inherent in the multiple phenomena of nature (polytheism or cosmotheism, yǔzhòu shénlùn 宇宙神论). The shén 神, as explained in the Shuowen Jiezi, "are the spirits of Heaven. They draw out the ten thousand things". Shen and ancestors (祖 zǔ) are agents who generate phenomena which reveal or reproduce the order of Heaven. Shen, as defined by the scholar Stephen Teiser, is a term that needs to be translated into English in at least three different ways, according to the context: "spirit", "spirits", and "spiritual". The first, "spirit", is in the sense of "human spirit" or "psyche". The second use is "spirits" or "gods"—the latter written in lowercase because "Chinese spirits and gods need not be seen as all-powerful, transcendent, or creators of the world". These "spirits" are associated with stars, mountains, and streams and directly influence what happens in the natural and human world. A thing or being is "spiritual"—the third sense of shen—when it inspires awe or wonder.

Shen are opposed in several ways to guǐ 鬼 ("ghosts", or "demons"). Shen are considered yáng 阴, while gui are yīn 阴. Gui may be the spirit or soul of an ancestor called back to live in the family's spirit tablet. Yet the combination 鬼神 guǐshén ("ghosts and spirits") includes both good and bad, those that are lucky or unlucky, benevolent or malevolent, the heavenly and the demonic aspect of living beings. This duality of guishen animates all beings, whether rocks, trees, and planets, or animals and human beings. In this sense, "animism" may be said to characterise the Chinese worldview. Further, since humans, shen, and gui are all made of 气 qì (pneuma or primordial stuff), there is no gap or barrier between good and bad spirits or between these spirits and human beings. There is no ontological difference between gods and demons, and humans may emulate the gods and join them in the pantheon. If these spirits are neglected or abandoned, or were not treated with death rituals if they were humans, they become hungry and are trapped in places where they met their death, becoming dangerous for living beings and requiring exorcism.

=== Religious economy of temples and rituals ===
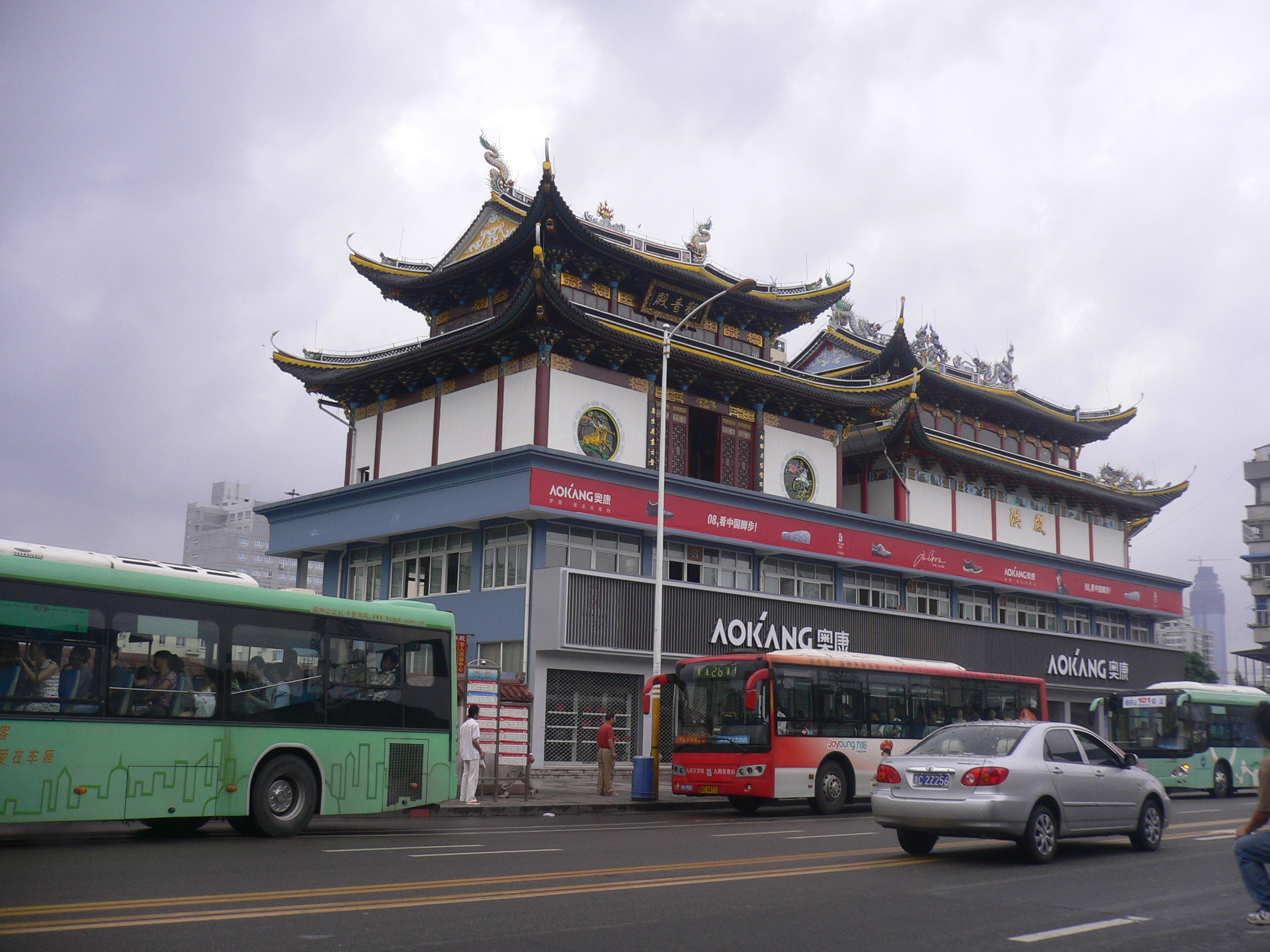
Folk temple on the rooftop of a commercial building in the city of Wenzhou

The economic dimension of Chinese folk religion is also important. Mayfair Yang (2007) studied how rituals and temples interweave to form networks of grassroots socio-economic capital for the welfare of local communities, fostering the circulation of wealth and its investment in the "sacred capital" of temples, gods and ancestors.

This religious economy already played a role in periods of imperial China, plays a significant role in modern Taiwan, and is seen as a driving force in the rapid economic development in parts of rural China, especially the southern and eastern coasts.

According to Law (2005), in his study about the relationship between the revival of folk religion and the reconstruction of patriarchal civilisation:

"Similar to the case in Taiwan, the practice of folk religion in rural southern China, particularly in the Pearl River Delta, has thrived as the economy has developed. ... In contrast to Weberian predictions, these phenomena suggest that drastic economic development in the Pearl River Delta may not lead to total disenchantment with beliefs concerning magic in the cosmos. On the contrary, the revival of folk religions in the Delta region is serving as a countervailing re-embedding force from the local cultural context, leading to the coexistence of the world of enchantments and the modern world."

Yang defined it as an "embedded capitalism", which preserves local identity and autonomy, and an "ethical capitalism" in which the drive for individual accumulation of money is tempered by religious and kinship ethics of generosity that foster the sharing and investment of wealth in the construction of civil society. Hao (2017) defined lineage temples as nodes of economic and political power which work through the principle of crowdfunding (zhongchou):

"A successful family temple economy expands its clientele from lineage relatives to strangers from other villages and kin groups by shifting from the worship of a single ancestor to embrace diverse religions. In this way, the management of a temple metamorphoses into a real business. Most Shishi villages have associations for the elderly (laorenhui), which are formed through a 'civil election' (minxuan) among prosperous businessmen representing their family committees. This association resembles the local government of a village, with responsibilities for popular rituals as well as public order."

== Main religions ==
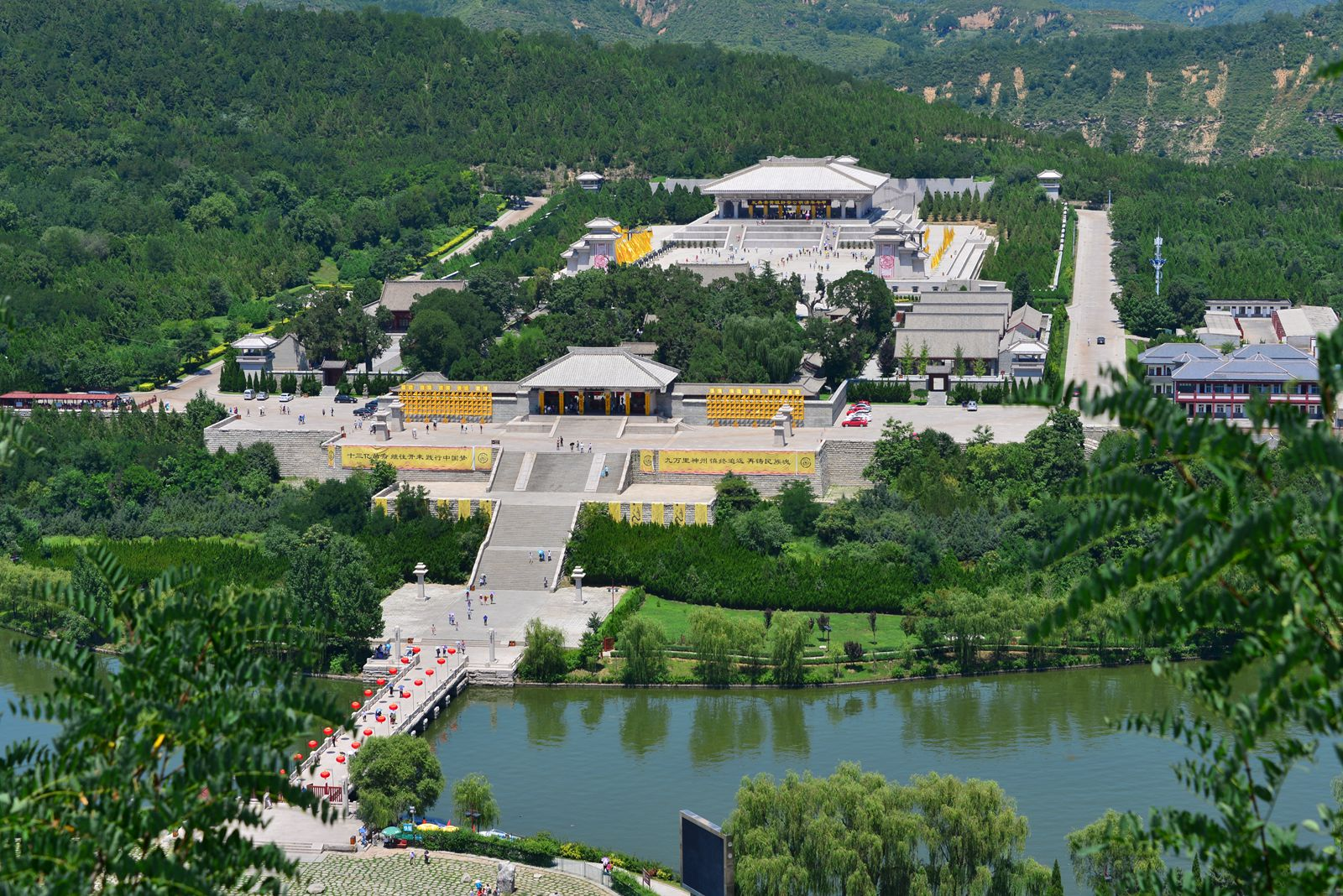
Xuanyuan Temple in Huangling, Yan'an, Shaanxi, dedicated to the worship of Xuanyuan Huangdi (the "Yellow Deity of the Chariot Shaft") at the ideal sacred centre of China. (Note: Huángdì (黄帝 "Yellow Emperor" or "Yellow Deity") or Huángshén (黄神 "Yellow God"), also known as Huángshén Běidǒu (黄神北斗 "Yellow God of the Northern Dipper"), Xuānyuánshì (轩辕氏 "Master of the Chariot Shaft") and Zhōngyuèdàdì (中岳大帝 "Great Deity of the Central Peak"), is the creator of Huaxia, the spiritual foundation of the civilisation of China. He represents the man who embodies or grasps the axis mundi (Kunlun Mountain), the hub of creation, identifying with the principle of the universe (天 Tiān), bringing the divine order into physical reality and thus opening the gateways to immortality. The character 黄 huáng, for the color "yellow", also means, by homophony and shared etymology with 皇 huáng, "august", "creator" and "radiant", other attributes that identify the Yellow Emperor with Shàngdì (上帝 "Highest Deity") in his human form. As a human, Xuanyuan was the fruit of virginal birth, since his mother Fubao conceived him when she was aroused, while walking in the countryside, by seeing a yellow lightning revolving around the Big Dipper. She gave birth to her son on the mount of Shou (Longevity) or mount Xuanyuan (Chariot Shaft), after which he was named.)

In China, many religious believers practice or draw beliefs from multiple religions simultaneously and are not exclusively associated with a single faith. Generally, such syncretic practices fuse Taoism, Buddhism, and folk religion.

=== Chinese popular religion ===
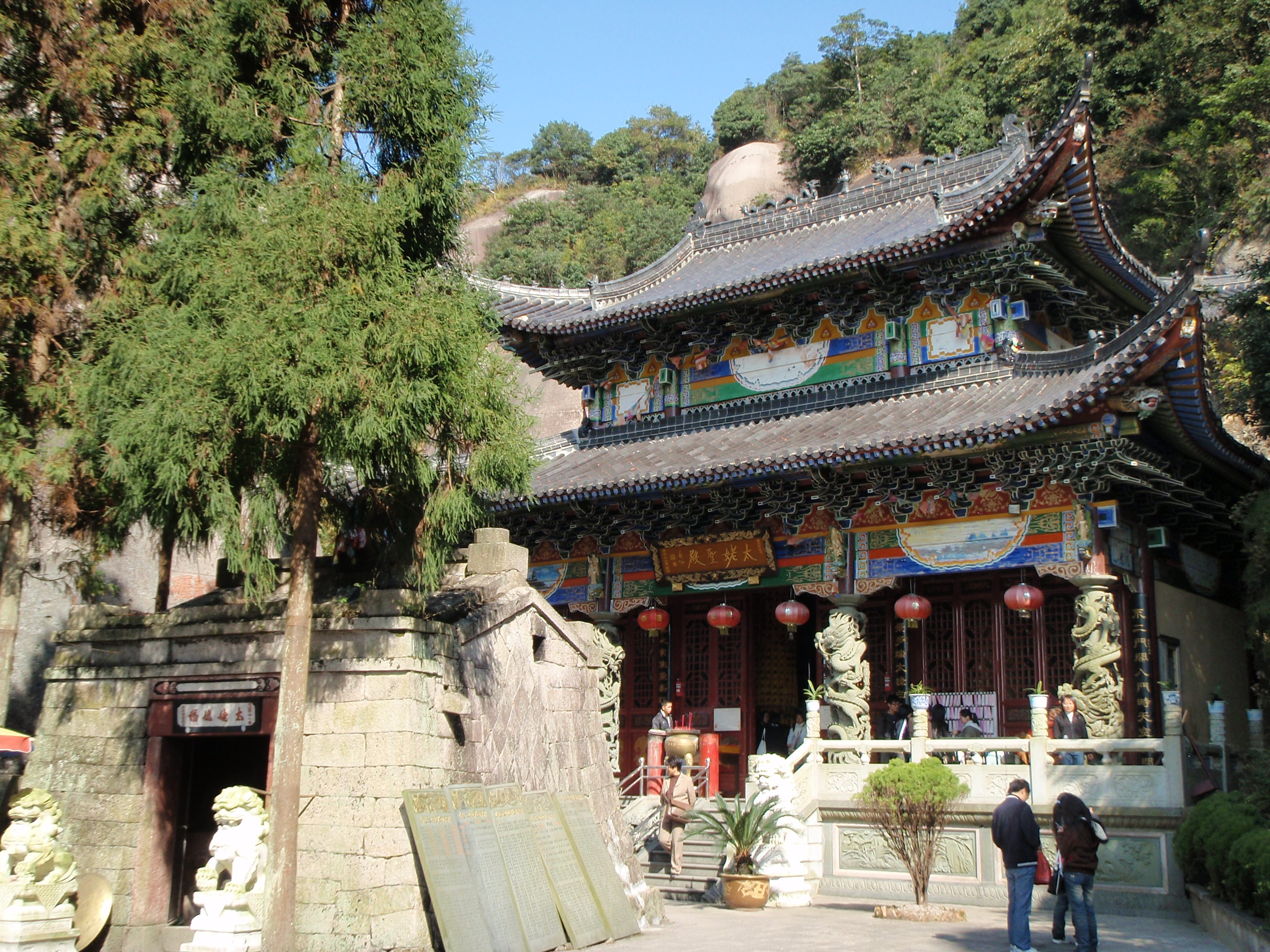
Temple of the Great Goddess in Fuding, Ningde, Fujian. The compound has a small ancient pavilion and a larger modern one behind of it.

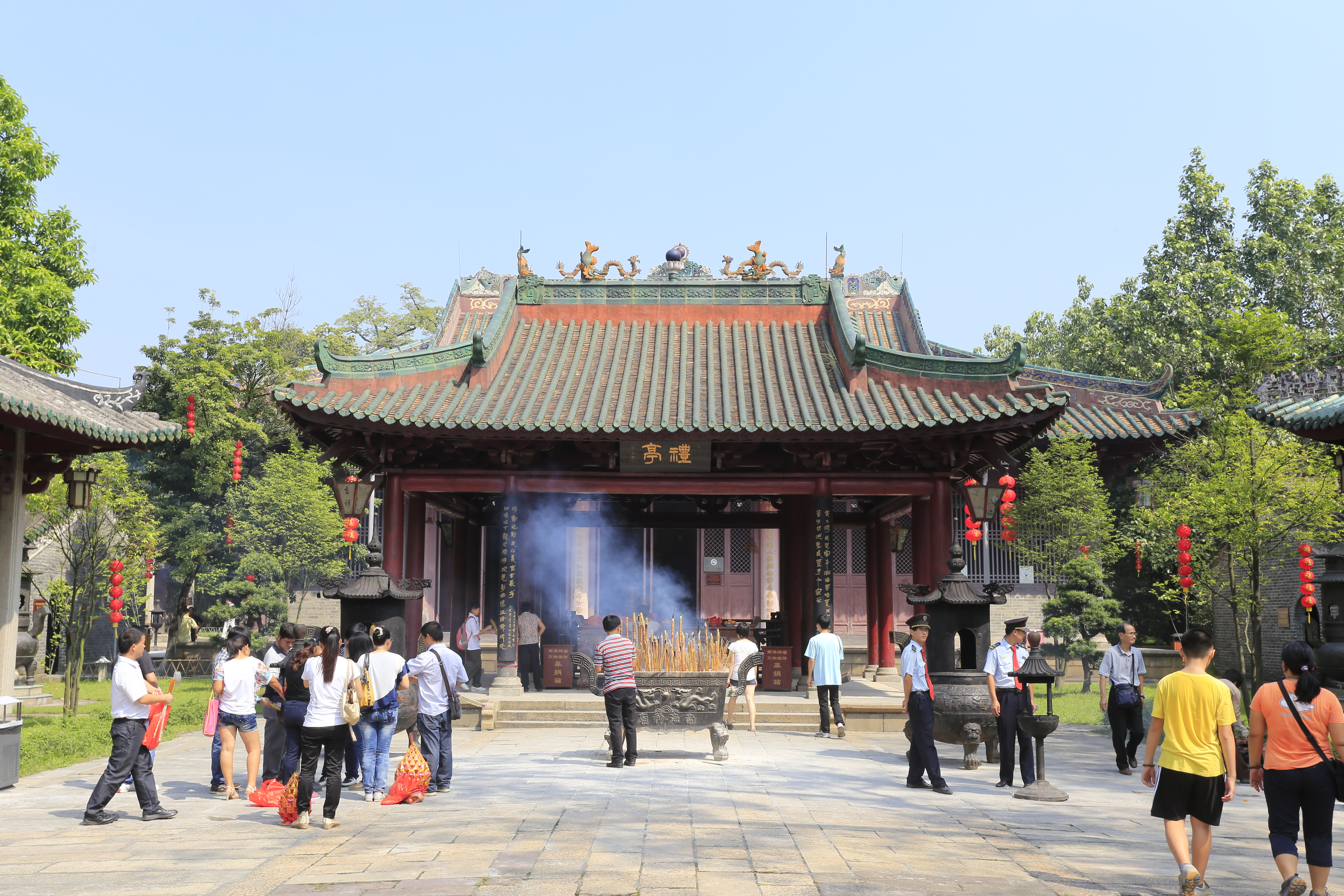
Temple of the God of the South Sea in Guangzhou, Guangdong

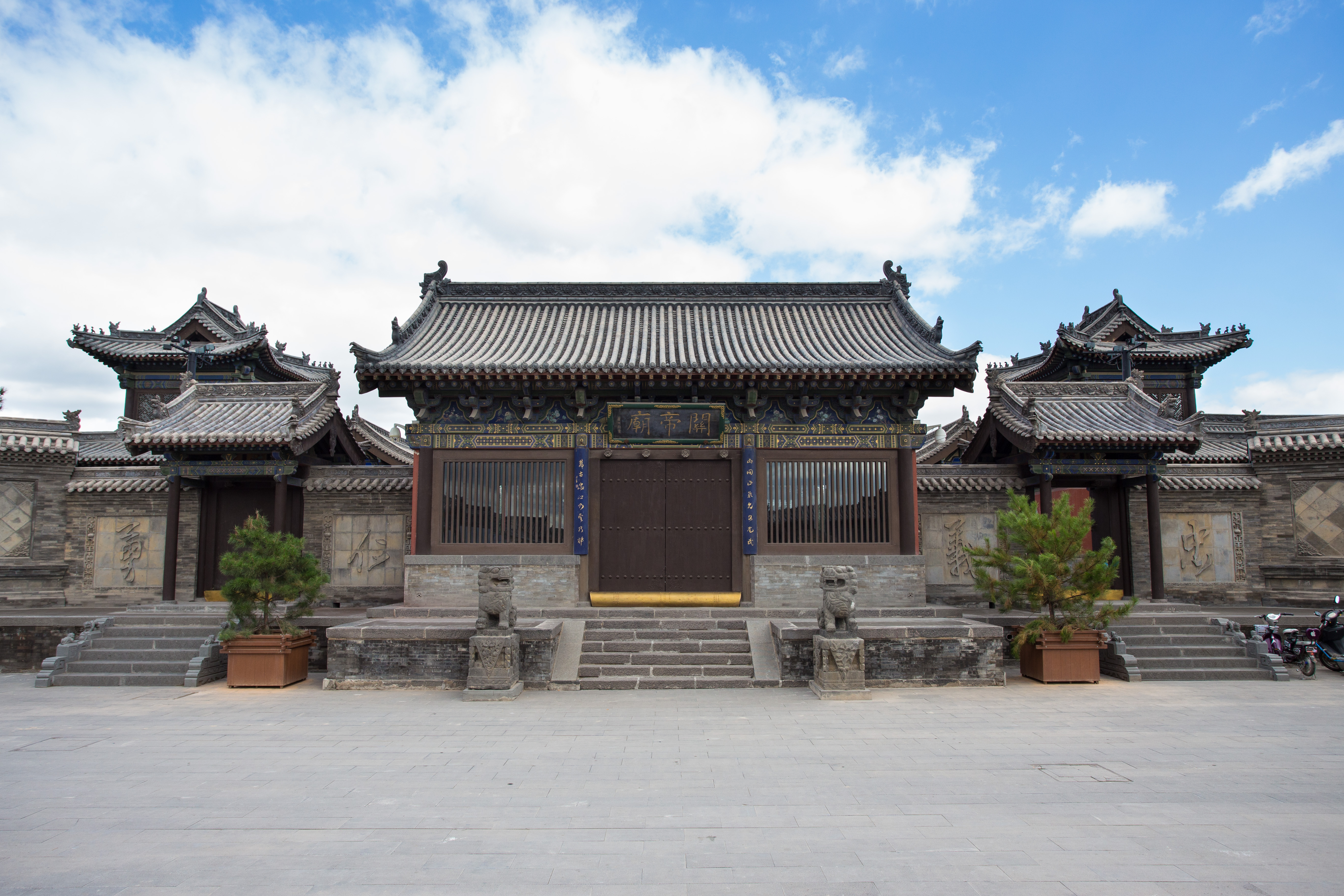
Temple of Guandi, the god of war, in Datong, Shanxi

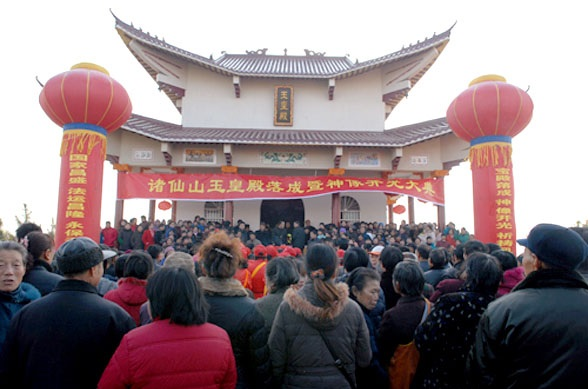
People forgathering at an ancestral shrine in Hong'an, Hubei

Chinese popular or folk religion, usually referred to as traditional faith (chuantong xinyang) is the "background" religious tradition of the Chinese, whose practices and beliefs are shared by both the elites and the common people. This tradition includes veneration of forces of nature and ancestors, exorcism of harmful forces, and a belief that a rational order structures the universe, and such order may be influenced by human beings and their rulers. Worship is devoted to gods and immortals (shén and xiān), who may be founders of human groups and lineages, deities of stars, earthly phenomena, and of human behavior.

Chinese popular religion is "diffused", rather than "institutional", in the sense that there are no canonical scriptures or unified clergy—though it relies upon the vast heritage represented by the Chinese classics—, and its practices and beliefs are handed down over the generations through Chinese mythology as told in popular forms of literature, theatre, and visual arts, and are embedded in rituals which define the microcosm of the nuclear families, the kins or lineages (which are peoples within the Chinese people, identified by the same surnames and by the same ancestor-god), and professional guilds, rather than in institutions with merely religious functions. It is a meaning system of social solidarity and identity, which provides the fabric of Chinese society, uniting all its levels from the lineages to the village or city communities, to the state and the national economy.

Because this common religion is embedded in Chinese social relations, it historically has never had an objectifying name. Since the 2000s, Chinese scholars have proposed names to identify it more clearly, including "Chinese native religion" or "Chinese indigenous religion" (民俗宗教 mínsú zōngjiào), "Chinese ethnic religion" (民族宗教 mínzú zōngjiào), or simply "Chinese religion" (中華教 Zhōnghuájiào), "Shenism" (神教 Shénjiào) and "Shenxianism" (神仙教 Shénxiānjiào, "religion of deities and immortals"). This search for a precise name is meant to solve terminological confusion, since "folk religion" (民间宗教 mínjiān zōngjiào) or "folk belief" (民间信仰 mínjiān xìnyǎng) have historically defined the sectarian movements of salvation and not the local cults devoted to deities and progenitors, and it is also meant to identify a "national Chinese religion" similarly to Hinduism in India and Shinto in Japan.

Taoism has been defined by scholar and Taoist initiate Kristofer Schipper as a doctrinal and liturgical framework for the development of indigenous religions. The Zhengyi school is especially intertwined with local cults, with Zhengyi daoshi (道士, "masters of the Tao", otherwise commonly translated simply the "Taoists", since common followers and folk believers who are not part of Taoist orders are not identified as such) performing rituals for local temples and communities. Various vernacular orders of ritual ministers often identified as "folk Taoists", operate in folk religion but outside the jurisdiction of the state's Taoist Church or schools clearly identified as Taoist. Confucianism advocates the worship of gods and ancestors through appropriate rites. Folk temples and ancestral shrines, on special occasions, may use Confucian liturgy (儒 rú or 正统 zhèngtǒng, "orthoprax") led by Confucian "sages of rites" (礼生 lǐshēng), who in many cases are the elders of a local community. Confucian liturgies are alternated with Taoist liturgies and popular ritual styles. Taoism in its various currents, either comprehended or not within Chinese folk religion, has some of its origins from Chinese shamanism (Wuism).

Despite this great diversity, all experiences of Chinese religion have a common theological core that may be summarized in four cosmological and moral concepts: Tian (天), Heaven, the "transcendently immanent" source of moral meaning; qi (气), the breath or energy–matter that animates the universe; jingzu (敬祖), the veneration of ancestors; and bao ying (报应), moral reciprocity; together with two traditional concepts of fate and meaning: ming yun (命运), the personal destiny or burgeoning; and yuan fen (缘分), "fateful coincidence", good and bad chances and potential relationships.

In Chinese religion yin and yang constitute the polarity that describes the order of the universe, held in balance by the interaction of principles of growth or expansion (shen) and principles of waning or contraction (gui), with act (yang) usually preferred over receptiveness (yin). Ling (numen or sacred) coincides with the middle way between the two states, that is the inchoate order of creation. It is the force establishing responsive communication between yin and yang, and is the power of gods, masters of building and healing, rites and sages.

The present-day government of China, like the erstwhile imperial dynasties of the Ming and Qing, tolerates popular religious cults if they bolster social stability, but suppresses or persecutes cults and deities which threaten moral order. After the fall of the empire in 1911, governments and elites opposed or attempted to eradicate folk religion in order to promote "modern" values while overcoming "feudal superstition". These attitudes began to change in the late 20th century, and contemporary scholars generally have a positive vision of popular religion.

Since the 1980s Chinese folk religions experienced a revival in both mainland China and Taiwan. Some forms have received official approval as they preserve traditional Chinese culture, including the worship of Mazu and the school of Sanyiism in Fujian, Huangdi worship, and other forms of local worship, for instance the worship of Longwang, Pangu or Caishen. In mid-2015 the government of Zhejiang began the registration of the province's tens of thousands of folk religious temples.

According to the most recent demographic analyses, an average 80% of the population of China, approximately 1 billion people, practises cults of gods and ancestors or belongs to folk religious movements. Moreover, according to one survey approximately 14% of the population claims different levels of affiliation with Taoist practices. Other figures from the micro-level testify the wide proliferation of folk religions: in 1989 there were 21,000 male and female shamans (shen han and wu po respectively, as they are named locally), 60% of them young, in the Pingguo County of Guangxi alone; and by the mid-1990s the government of the Yulin Prefecture of Shaanxi counted over 10,000 folk temples on its territory alone, for a population of 3.1 million, an average of one temple per 315 persons.

According to Wu and Lansdowne:

"... numbers for authorised religions are dwarfed by the huge comeback of traditional folk religion in China. ... these actually may involve the majority of the population. Chinese officials and scholars now are studying "folk faiths" ... after decades of suppressing any discussion of this phenomenon. Certain local officials for some time have had to treat regional folk faiths as de facto legitimate religion, alongside the five authorized religions."

According to Yiyi Lu, discussing the reconstruction of Chinese civil society:

"... the two decades after the reforms have seen the revival of many folk societies organized around the worshipping of local deities, which had been banned by the state for decades as 'feudal superstition'. These societies enjoy wide local support, as they carry on traditions going back many generations, and cater to popular beliefs in theism, fatalism and retribution ... Because they build on tradition, common interest, and common values, these societies enjoy social legitimacy ... ."

In December 2015, the Chinese Folk Temples' Management Association was formally established with the approval of the government of China and under the aegis of the Ministry of Cultural Affairs.

==== Folk religious movements of salvation ====
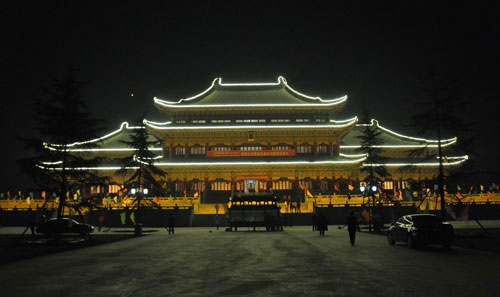
Temple of the Founding Father (师祖殿 Shīzǔdiàn) of the principal holy see (圣地 shèngdì) of the Plum Flower school in Xingtai, Hebei

China has a long history of sectarian traditions, called "salvationist religions" (救度宗教 jiùdù zōngjiào) by some scholars, which are characterized by a concern for salvation (moral fulfillment) of the person and the society, having a soteriological and eschatological character. They generally emerged from the common religion but are separate from the lineage cults of ancestors and progenitors, as well as from the communal worship of deities of village temples, neighborhood, corporation, or national temples. The 20th-century expression of such religions has been studied under Prasenjit Duara's definition of "redemptive societies" (救世团体 jiùshì tuántǐ), while modern Chinese scholarship describes them as "folk religious sects" (民間宗教 mínjiān zōngjiào, 民间教门 mínjiān jiàomén or 民间教派 mínjiān jiàopài), overcoming the ancient derogatory definition of xiéjiào (邪教), "evil religion".

These religions are characterized by egalitarianism, charismatic founding figures claiming to have received divine revelation, a millenarian eschatology and voluntary path of salvation, an embodied experience of the numinous through healing and cultivation, and an expansive orientation through good deeds, evangelism and philanthropy. Their practices are focused on improving morality, body cultivation, and on the recitation of scriptures.

Many redemptive religions of the 20th and 21st century aspire to embody and reform Chinese tradition in the face of Western modernism and materialism. They include Yiguandao and other sects belonging to the Xiantiandao (先天道 "Way of Former Heaven"), Jiugongdao (九宮道 "Way of the Nine Palaces"), the various branches of Luoism, Zailiism, and more recent ones such as the Church of Virtue, Weixinism, Xuanyuanism and Tiandiism. Also the qigong schools are developments of folk salvationist movements. All these movements were banned in the early Republic of China (1912–49) and later People's Republic. Many of them still remain underground or unrecognized in China, while others—for instance the Church of Virtue, Tiandiism, Xuanyuanism, Weixinism and Yiguandao—operate in China and collaborate with academic and non-governmental organizations. Sanyiism is another folk religious organization founded in the 16th century, which is present in the Putian region (Xinghua) of Fujian where it is legally recognized. Some of these movements began to register as branches of the Taoist Association since the 1990s.

Another category that has been sometimes confused with that of the folk salvationist movements by scholars is that of the secret societies (會道門 huìdàomén, 祕密社會 mìmì shèhuì, or 秘密結社 mìmì jiéshè). They are religious communities of initiatory and secretive character, including rural militias such as the Red Spears (紅槍會) and the Big Knives (大刀會), and fraternal organizations such as the Green Gangs (青幫) and the Elders' Societies (哥老會). They were very active in the early republican period, and often identified as "heretical doctrines" (宗教異端 zōngjiào yìduān). Recent scholarship has coined the category of "secret sects" (祕密教門 mìmì jiàomén) to distinguish positively-viewed peasant secret societies of the Yuan, Ming and Qing dynasties, from the negatively-viewed secret societies of the early republic which were regarded as anti-revolutionary forces.

A further type of folk religious movements, possibly overlapping with the "secret sects", are the martial sects. They combine two aspects: the wénchǎng (文场 "cultural field"), which is a doctrinal aspect characterised by elaborate cosmologies, theologies, and liturgies, and usually taught only to initiates; and the wǔchǎng (武场 "martial field"), that is the practice of bodily cultivation, usually shown as the "public face" of the sect. These martial folk religions were outlawed by Ming imperial decrees which continued to be enforced until the fall of the Qing dynasty in the 20th century. An example of martial sect is Meihuaism (梅花教 Méihuājiào, "Plum Flowers"), a branch of Baguaism which has become very popular throughout northern China. In Taiwan, virtually all folk salvationist movements operate freely since the late 1980s.

=== Confucianism ===
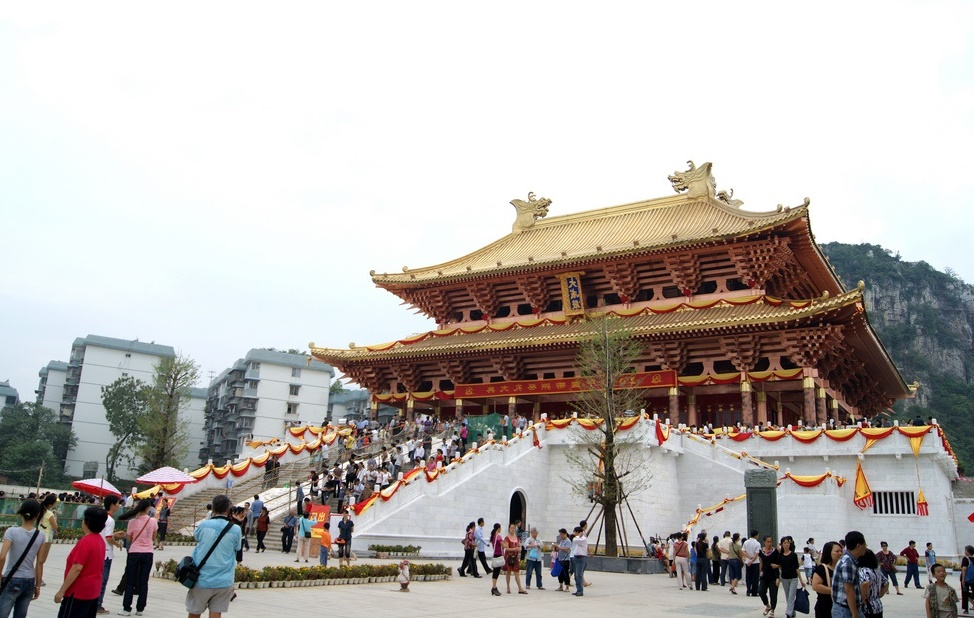
Temple of Confucius of Liuzhou, Guangxi. This is a wénmiào (文庙), that is to say a temple where Confucius is worshiped as Wéndì (文帝), "God of Culture".

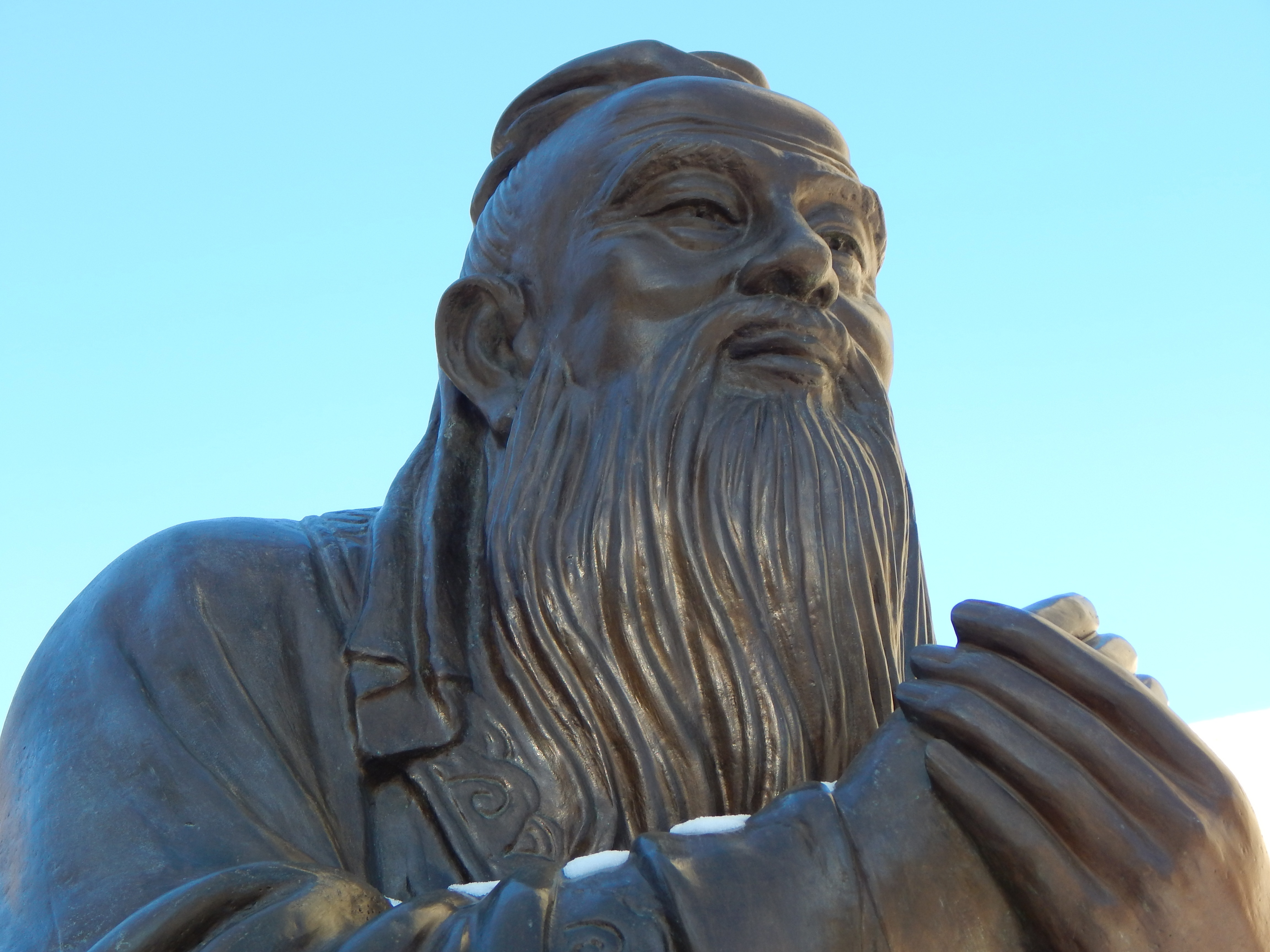
One of the many modern statues of Confucius that have been erected in China.

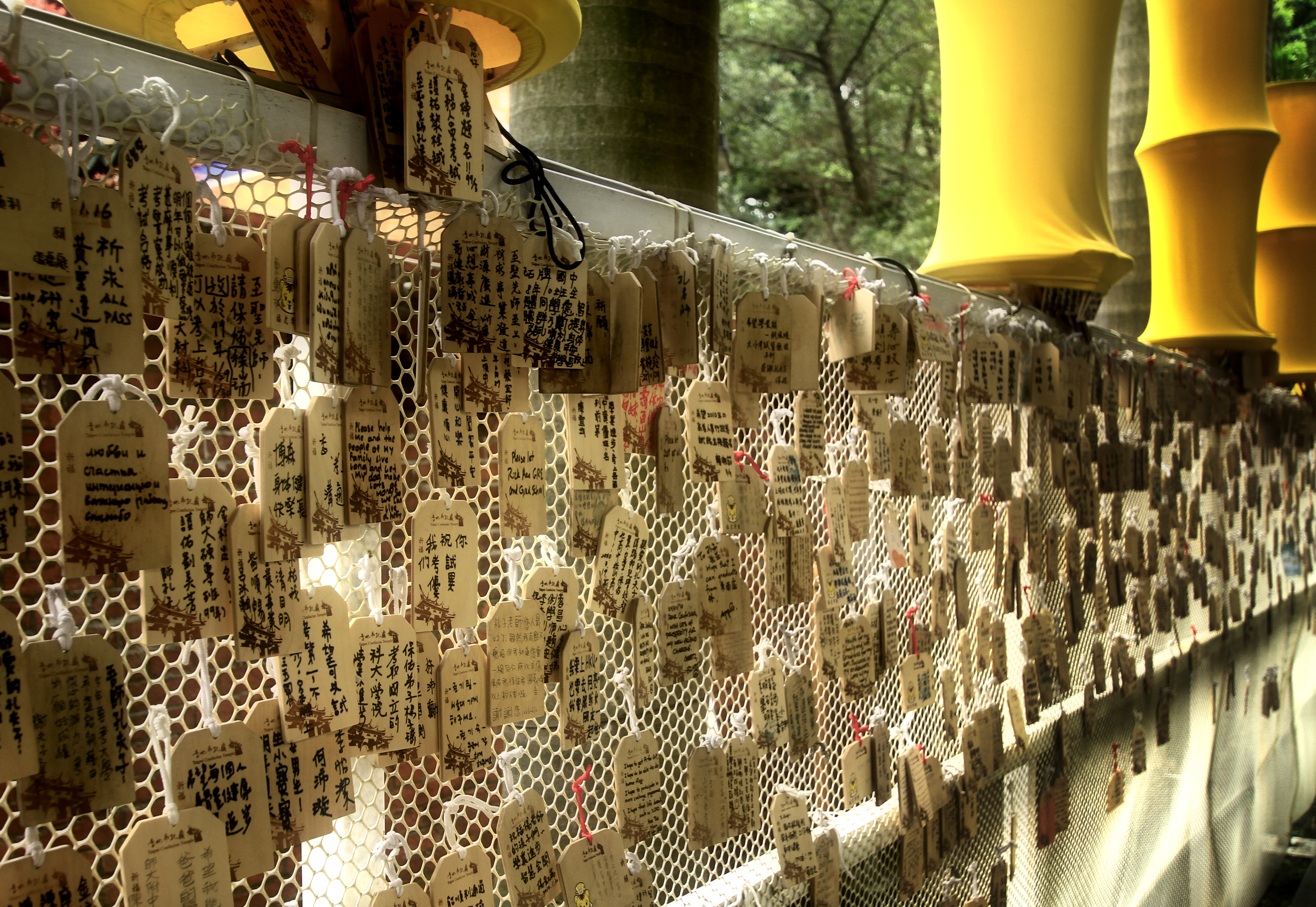
Prayer flairs at a Confucian temple

Confucianism in Chinese is called, 儒教 Rújiào, the "teaching of scholars", or 孔教 Kǒngjiào, the "teaching of Confucius". It is both a teaching and a set of ritual practices. Yong Chen calls the question on the definition of Confucianism "probably one of the most controversial issues in both Confucian scholarship and the discipline of religious studies".

Guy Alitto points out that there was "literally no equivalent for the Western (and later worldwide) concept of 'Confucianism' in traditional Chinese discourse". He argues that the Jesuit missionaries of the 16th century selected Confucius from many possible sages to serve as the counterpart to Christ or Muhammad in order to meet European religion categories. They used a variety of writings by Confucius and his followers to coin a new "-ism"—"Confucianism"—which they presented as a "rationalist secular-ethical code", not as a religion. This secular understanding of Confucianism inspired both the Enlightenment in Europe in the 18th century, and Chinese intellectuals of the 20th century. Liang Shuming, a philosopher of the May Fourth Movement, wrote that Confucianism "functioned as a religion without actually being one". Western scholarship generally accepted this understanding. In the decades following the Second World War, however, many Chinese intellectuals and academic scholars in the West, among whom Tu Weiming, reversed this assessment. Confucianism, for this new generation of scholars, became a "true religion" that offered "immanent transcendence".

According to Herbert Fingarette's conceptualization of Confucianism as a religion which proposes "the secular as sacred", Confucianism transcends the dichotomy between religion and humanism. Confucians experience the sacred as existing in this world as part of everyday life, most importantly in family and social relations. Confucianism focuses on a this worldly awareness of Tian (天 "Heaven"), the search for a middle way in order to preserve social harmony and on respect through teaching and a set of ritual practices. Joël Thoraval finds that Confucianism expresses on a popular level in the widespread worship of five cosmological entities: Heaven and Earth (Di 地), the sovereign or the government (jūn 君), ancestors (qīn 親) and masters (shī 師). Confucians cultivate family bonds and social harmony rather than pursuing a transcendental salvation. The scholar Joseph Adler concludes that Confucianism is not so much a religion in the Western sense, but rather "a non-theistic, diffused religious tradition", and that Tian is not so much a personal God but rather "an impersonal absolute, like dao and Brahman".

Broadly speaking, however, scholars agree that Confucianism may be also defined as an ethico-political system, developed from the teachings of the philosopher Confucius (551–479 BCE). Confucianism originated during the Spring and Autumn period and developed metaphysical and cosmological elements in the Han dynasty (206 BCE–220 CE), to match the developments in Buddhism and Taoism which were dominant among the populace. By the same period, Confucianism became the core idea of Chinese imperial politics. According to He Guanghu, Confucianism may be identified as a continuation of the Shang-Zhou (~1600 BCE–256 BCE) official religion, or the Chinese aboriginal religion which has lasted uninterrupted for three thousand years.

By the words of Tu Weiming and other Confucian scholars who recover the work of Kang Youwei (a Confucian reformer of the early 20th century), Confucianism revolves around the pursuit of the unity of the individual self and Heaven, or, otherwise said, around the relationship between humanity and Heaven. The principle of Heaven (Li or Dao) is the order of the creation and the source of divine authority, monistic in its structure. Individuals may realize their humanity and become one with Heaven through the contemplation of this order. This transformation of the self may be extended to the family and society to create a harmonious fiduciary community. Confucianism conciliates both the inner and outer polarities of spiritual cultivation, that is to say self-cultivation and world redemption, synthesised in the ideal of "sageliness within and kingliness without". As defined by Stephan Feuchtwang, Heaven is thought to have an ordering law which preserves the world, which has to be followed by humanity by means of a "middle way" between yin and yang forces; social harmony or morality is identified as patriarchy, which is the worship of ancestors and progenitors in the male line, in ancestral shrines.

In Confucian thought, human beings are always teachable, improvable, and perfectible through personal and communal endeavor of self-cultivation and self-creation. Some of the basic Confucian ethical and practical concepts include rén, yì, lǐ, and zhì. Ren is translated as "humaneness", or the essence proper of a human being, which is characterized by compassionate mind; it is the virtue endowed by Heaven and at the same time what allows man to achieve oneness with Heaven—in the Datong shu it is defined as "to form one body with all things" and "when the self and others are not separated ... compassion is aroused". Yi is "righteousness", which consists in the ability to always maintain a moral disposition to do good things. Li is a system of ritual norms and propriety of behavior which determine how a person should act in everyday life. Zhi is the ability to see what is right and what is wrong, in the behavior exhibited by others. Confucianism holds one in contempt when he fails to uphold the cardinal moral values of ren and yi.

Confucianism never developed an institutional structure similar to that of Taoism, and its religious body never differentiated from Chinese folk religion. Since the 2000s, Confucianism has been embraced as a religious identity by a large numbers of intellectuals and students in China. In 2003, the Confucian intellectual Kang Xiaoguang published a manifesto in which he made four suggestions: Confucian education should enter official education at any level, from elementary to high school; the state should establish Confucianism as the state religion by law; Confucian religion should enter the daily life of ordinary people, a purpose achievable through a standardization and development of doctrines, rituals, organizations, churches and activity sites; the Confucian religion should be spread through non-governmental organizations. Another modern proponent of the institutionalization of Confucianism in a state church is Jiang Qing.

In 2005, the Center for the Study of Confucian Religion was established and guoxue ("national learning") started to be implemented in public schools. Being well received by the population, Confucian preachers started to appear on television since 2006. The most enthusiast New Confucians proclaim the uniqueness and superiority of Confucian Chinese culture, and have generated some popular sentiment against Western cultural influences in China.

The idea of a "Confucian Church" as the state religion of China has roots in the thought of Kang Youwei (1858–1927), an exponent of the early New Confucian search for a regeneration of the social relevance of Confucianism at a time when it fell out of favour with the fall of the Qing dynasty and the end of the Chinese empire. Kang modeled his ideal "Confucian Church" after European national Christian churches, as a hierarchic and centralized institution, closely bound to the state, with local church branches devoted to the worship of Confucius and the spread of his teachings.

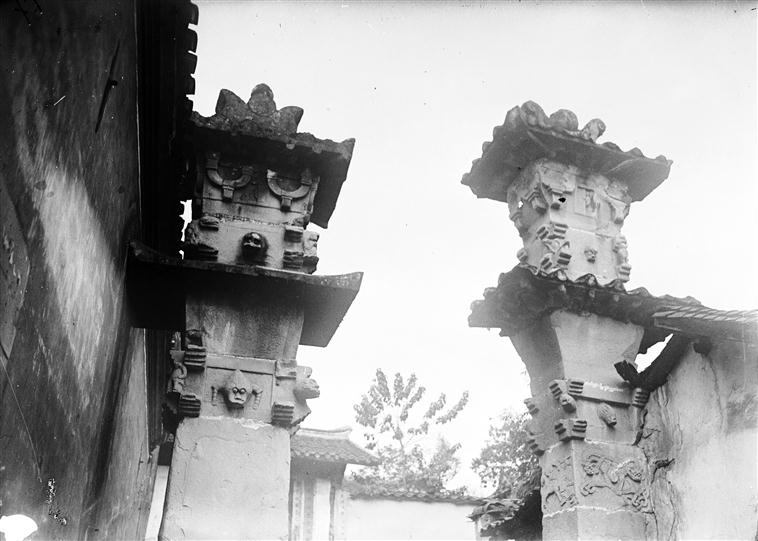
Eastern Han (25–220 AD) Chinese stone-carved que pillar gates of Dingfang, Zhong County, Chongqing that once belonged to a temple dedicated to the Warring States era general Ba Manzi.

In contemporary China, the Confucian revival has developed into various interwoven directions: the proliferation of Confucian schools or academies (shuyuan 书院 or 孔学堂 Kǒngxuétáng, "Confucian learning halls"), the resurgence of Confucian rites (chuántǒng lǐyí 传统礼仪), and the birth of new forms of Confucian activity on the popular level, such as the Confucian communities (shèqū rúxué 社区儒学). Some scholars also consider the reconstruction of lineage churches and their ancestral temples, as well as of cults and temples of natural gods and national heroes within broader Chinese traditional religion, as part of the renewal of Confucianism.

Other forms of revival are folk religious movements of salvation with a Confucian focus, or Confucian churches, for example the Yidan xuetang (一耽学堂) of Beijing, the Mengmutang (孟母堂) of Shanghai, Confucian Shenism (儒宗神教 Rúzōng Shénjiào) or the phoenix churches, the Confucian Fellowship (儒教道坛 Rújiào Dàotán) of northern Fujian, and ancestral temples of the Kong (Confucius') lineage operating as churches for Confucian teaching.

Also the Hong Kong Confucian Academy, one of the direct heirs of Kang Youwei's Confucian Church, has expanded its activities to the mainland, with the construction of statues of Confucius, the establishment of Confucian hospitals, the restoration of temples and other activities. In 2009, Zhou Beichen founded another institution which inherits the idea of Kang Youwei's Confucian Church, the Sacred Hall of Confucius (孔圣堂 Kǒngshèngtáng) in Shenzhen, affiliated with the Federation of Confucian Culture of Qufu City. It was the first of a nationwide movement of congregations and civil organisations that was unified in 2015 in the Church of Confucius (孔圣会 Kǒngshènghuì). The first spiritual leader of the church is the scholar Jiang Qing, the founder and manager of the Yangming Confucian Abode (阳明精舍 Yángmíng jīngshě), a Confucian academy in Guiyang, Guizhou.

Chinese folk religious temples and kinship ancestral shrines may, on peculiar occasions, choose Confucian liturgy (called 儒 rú or 正统 zhèngtǒng, "orthoprax") led by Confucian ritual masters (礼生 lǐshēng) to worship the gods, instead of Taoist or popular ritual. "Confucian businessmen" (儒商 rúshāng, also "refined businessman") is a recently rediscovered concept defining people of the economic-entrepreneurial elite who recognise their social responsibility and therefore apply Confucian culture to their business.

=== Taoism ===
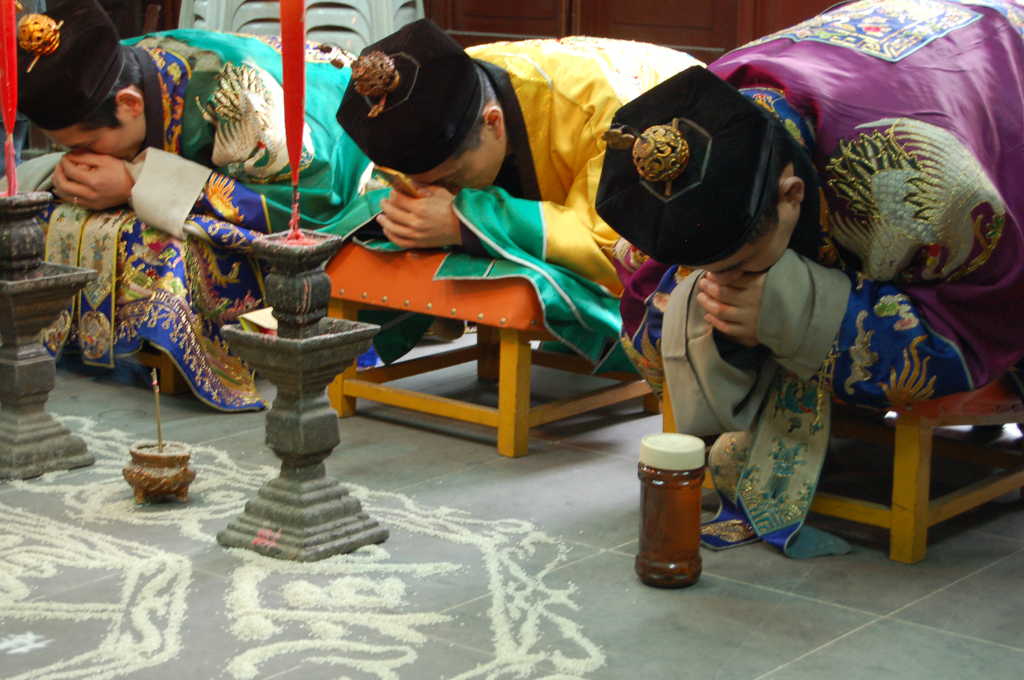
Priests of the Zhengyi order bowing while officiating a rite at the White Cloud Temple of Shanghai.

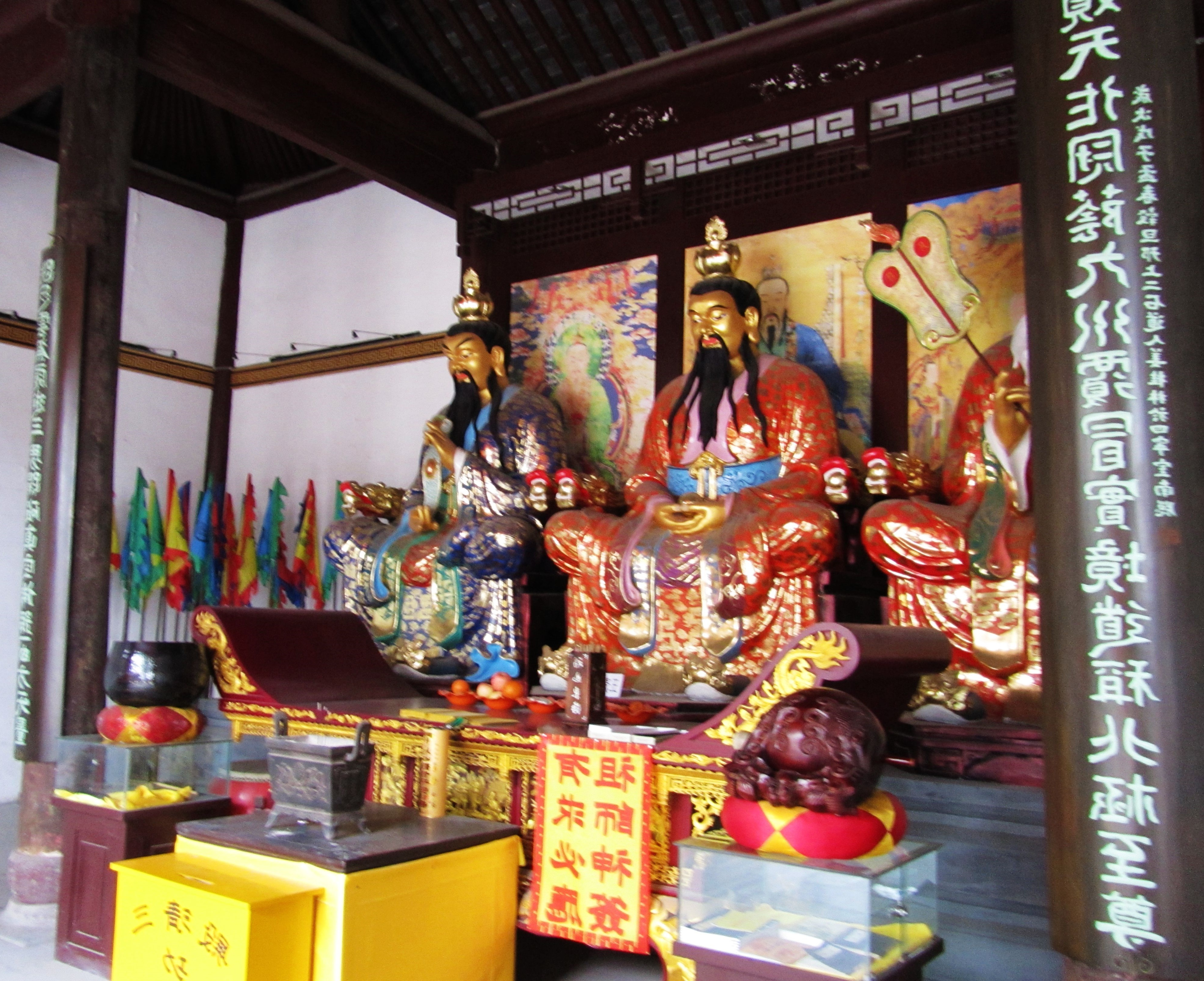
Altar of the Three Pure Ones, the main gods of Taoist theology, at the Wudang Taoist Temple in Yangzhou, Jiangsu.

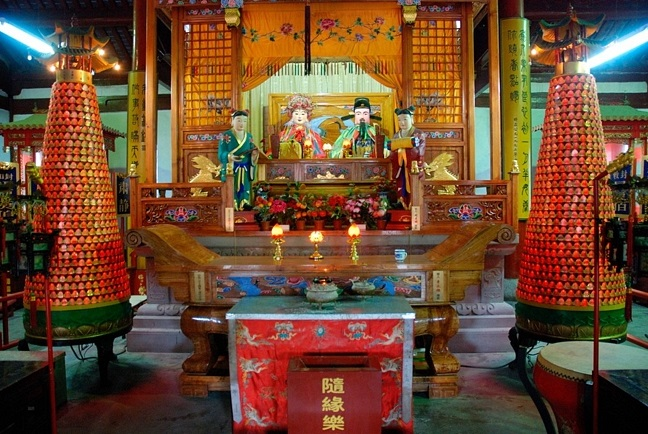
Altar to Shangdi (上帝 "Highest Deity") and Doumu (斗母 "Mother of the Chariot"), representing the originating principle of the universe in masculine and feminine form in some Taoist cosmologies, in the Chengxu Temple of Zhouzhuang, Jiangsu.

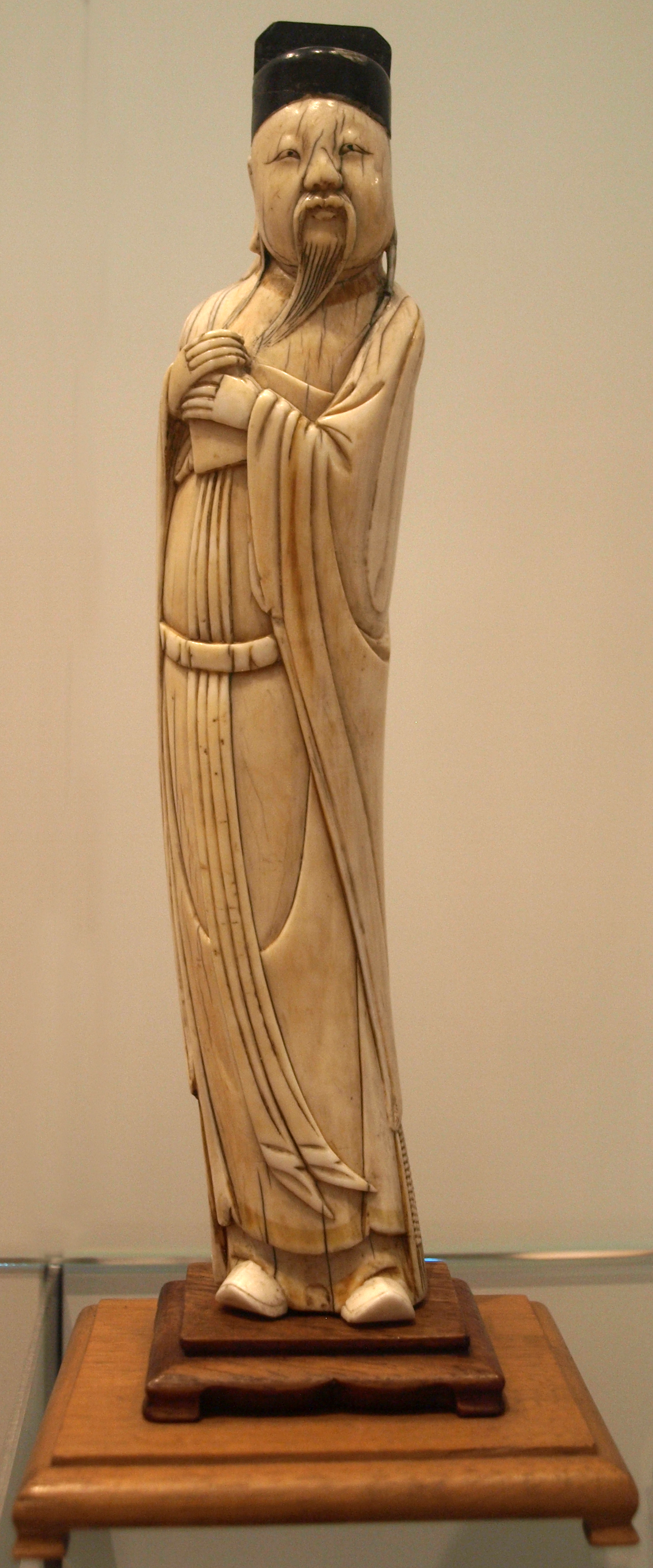
Wen Chang, Chinese god of literature, carved in ivory, c. 1550–1644, Ming dynasty.

Taoism (道教 Dàojiào) (also romanised as Daoism in the current pinyin spelling) encompasses a variety of related orders of philosophy and rite in Chinese religion. They share elements that go back to the 4th century BCE and to the prehistoric culture of China, such as the School of Yin and Yang and the thought of Laozi and Zhuangzi. Taoism has a distinct scriptural tradition, with the Dàodéjīng (道德经 "Book of the Way and its Virtue") of Laozi being regarded as its keystone. Taoism may be described, as does the scholar and Taoist initiate Kristofer Schipper in The Taoist Body (1986), as a doctrinal and liturgical framework or structure for developing the local cults of indigenous religion. Taoist traditions emphasize living in harmony with the Tao (also romanised as Dao). The term Tao means "way", "path" or "principle", and may also be found in Chinese philosophies and religions other than Taoism, including Confucian thought. In Taoism, however, Tao denotes the principle that is both the source and the pattern of development of everything that exists. It is ultimately ineffable: "The Tao that can be told is not the eternal Tao" says the first verse of the Tao Te Ching. According to the scholar Stephan Feuchtwang, the concept of Tao is equivalent to the ancient Greek concept of physis, "nature", that is the vision of the process of generation and regeneration of things and of the moral order.

By the Han dynasty (206 BCE – 220 CE) the various sources of Taoism coalesced into a coherent tradition of religious organizations and orders of ritualists. In earlier China, Taoists were thought of as hermits or ascetics who did not participate in political life. Zhuangzi was the best known of them, and it is significant that he lived in the south, where he was involved in local shamanic traditions. Women shamans played an important role in this tradition, which was particularly strong in the state of Chu. Early Taoist movements developed their own institution in contrast to shamanism, but absorbing fundamental shamanic elements. Shamans revealed texts of Taoism from early times down to at least the 20th century.

Taoist institutional orders evolved in strains that in recent times are conventionally grouped in two main branches: Quanzhen Taoism and Zhengyi Taoism. Taoist schools traditionally feature reverence for Laozi, immortals or ancestors, along with a variety of rituals for divination and exorcism, and techniques for achieving ecstasy, longevity or immortality. Ethics and appropriate behavior may vary depending on the particular school, but in general all emphasize wu wei (effortless action), "naturalness", simplicity, spontaneity, and the Three Treasures: compassion, moderation, and humility.

Taoism has had profound influence on Chinese culture over the course of the centuries, and Taoists (Chinese: 道士; pinyin: dàoshi, "masters of the Tao") usually take care to mark the distinction between their ritual tradition and those of vernacular orders which are not recognised as Taoist.

Taoism was suppressed during the Cultural Revolution of the 1960s and early 1970s but its traditions endured in secrecy and revived in following decades. In 1956 a national organisation, the Chinese Taoist Association, was established to govern the activity of Taoist orders and temples. According to demographic analyses, approximately 13% of the population of China claims a loose affiliation with Taoist practices, while self-proclaimed "Taoists" (a title traditionally attributed only to the daoshi, i.e. the priests, who are experts of Taoist doctrines and rites, and to their closest disciples) might be 12 million (c. 1%). The definition of "Taoist" is complicated by the fact that many folk sects of salvation and their members began to be registered as branches of the Taoist association in the 1990s.

There are two types of Taoists, following the distinction between the Quanzhen and Zhengyi traditions. Quanzhen daoshi are celibate monks, and therefore the Taoist temples of the Quanzhen school are monasteries. Contrariwise, Zhengyi daoshi, also known as sanju daoshi ("scattered" or "diffused" Taoists) or huoju daoshi (Taoists "who live at home"), are priests who may marry and have other jobs besides the sacerdotal office; they live among the population and perform Taoist rituals within common Chinese religion, for local temples and communities.

While the Chinese Taoist Association started as a Quanzhen institution, and remains based at the White Cloud Temple of Beijing, that also functions as the headquarters of the Quanzhen sects, from the 1990s onwards it started to open registration to the sanju daoshi of the Zhengyi branch, who are more numerous than the Quanzhen monks. The Chinese Taoist Association had already 20.000 registered sanju daoshi in the mid-1990s, while the total number of Zhengyi priests including the unregistered ones was estimated at 200.000 in the same years. The Zhengyi sanju daoshi are trained by other priests of the same sect, and historically received formal ordination by the Celestial Master, although the 63rd Celestial Master Zhang Enpu fled to Taiwan in the 1940s during the Chinese Civil War. Taoism, both in registered and unregistered forms, has experienced a strong development since the 1990s, and dominates the religious life of coastal provinces.

==== Vernacular ritual mastery traditions ====
Chinese vernacular ritual masters, also referred to as practitioners of Faism (法教 Fǎjiào, "rites/laws' traditions"), also named Folk Taoism (民间道教 Mínjiàn Dàojiào), or "Red Taoism" (in southeast China and Taiwan), are orders of priests that operate within the Chinese folk religion but outside any institution of official Taoism. Such "masters of rites", fashi (法師), are known by a variety of names including hongtou daoshi (紅頭道士), popular in southeast China, meaning "redhead" or "redhat" daoshi, in contradistinction to the wutou daoshi (烏頭道士), "blackhead" or "blackhat" daoshi, as vernacular Taoists call the sanju daoshi of Zhengyi Taoism that were traditionally ordained by the Celestial Master. In some provinces of north China they are known as yīnyángshēng (阴阳生 "sages of yin and yang"), and by a variety of other names.

Although the two types of priests, daoshi and fashi, have the same roles in Chinese society—in that they may marry and they perform rituals for communities' temples or private homes—Zhengyi daoshi emphasise their Taoist tradition, distinguished from the vernacular tradition of the fashi. Some Western scholars have described vernacular Taoist traditions as "cataphatic" (i.e. of positive theology) in character, while professional Taoism as "kenotic" and "apophatic" (i.e. of negative theology).

Fashi are tongji practitioners (southern mediumship), healers, exorcists and they officiate jiao rituals of "universal salvation" (although historically they were excluded from performing such rites). They are not shamans (wu), with the exception of the order of Mount Lu in Jiangxi. Rather, they represent an intermediate level between the wu and the Taoists. Like the wu, the fashi identify with their deity, but while the wu embody wild forces, vernacular ritual masters represent order like the Taoists. Unlike the Taoists, who represent a tradition of high theology which is interethnic, both vernacular ritual masters and wu find their institutional base in local cults to particular deities, even though vernacular ritual masters are itinerant.

==== Chinese shamanic traditions ====
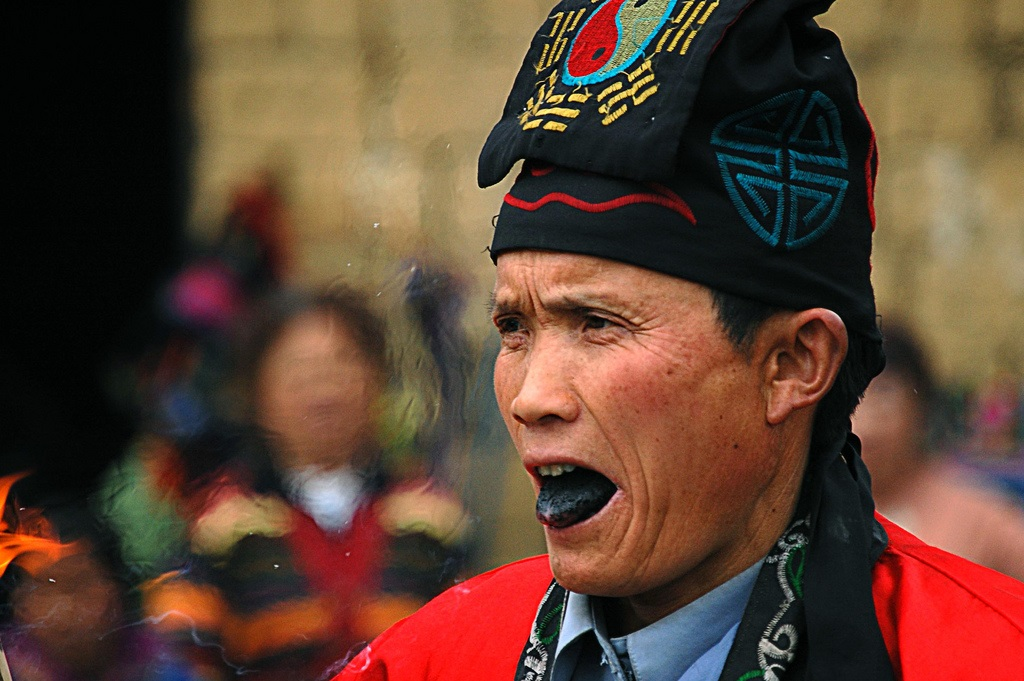
A 巫 wu master of the Xiangxi area.

Shamanism was the prevalent modality of pre-Han dynasty Chinese indigenous religion. The Chinese usage distinguishes the Chinese "Wuism" tradition (巫教 Wūjiào; properly shamanic, in which the practitioner has control over the force of the god and may travel to the underworld) from the tongji tradition (童乩; southern mediumship, in which the practitioner does not control the force of the god but is guided by it), and from non-Han Chinese Altaic shamanisms (萨满教 sàmǎnjiào) which are practiced in northern provinces.

With the rise of Confucian orthodoxy in the Han period (206 BCE – 220 CE), shamanic traditions found an institutionalized and intellectualized form within the esoteric philosophical discourse of Taoism. According to Chirita (2014), Confucianism itself, with its emphasis on hierarchy and ancestral rituals, derived from the shamanic discourse of the Shang dynasty (c. 1600 BCE – 1046 BCE). What Confucianism did was to marginalize the features of old shamanism which were dysfunctional for the new political regime. However, shamanic traditions continued uninterrupted within the folk religion and found precise and functional forms within Taoism.

In the Shang and later Zhou dynasty (c. 1046 BCE – 256 BCE), shamans had an important role in the political hierarchy, and were represented institutionally by the Ministry of Rites (大宗拍). The emperor was considered the supreme shaman, intermediating between the three realms of heaven, earth and humanity. The mission of a shaman (巫 wu) is "to repair the dysfunctionalities occurred in nature and generated after the sky had been separated from earth".

Since the 1980s the practice and study of shamanism has undergone a great revival in Chinese religion as a mean to repair the world to a harmonious whole after industrialization. Shamanism is viewed by many scholars as the foundation for the emergence of civilisation, and the shaman as "teacher and spirit" of peoples. The Chinese Society for Shamanic Studies was founded in Jilin City in 1988.

=== Buddhism ===
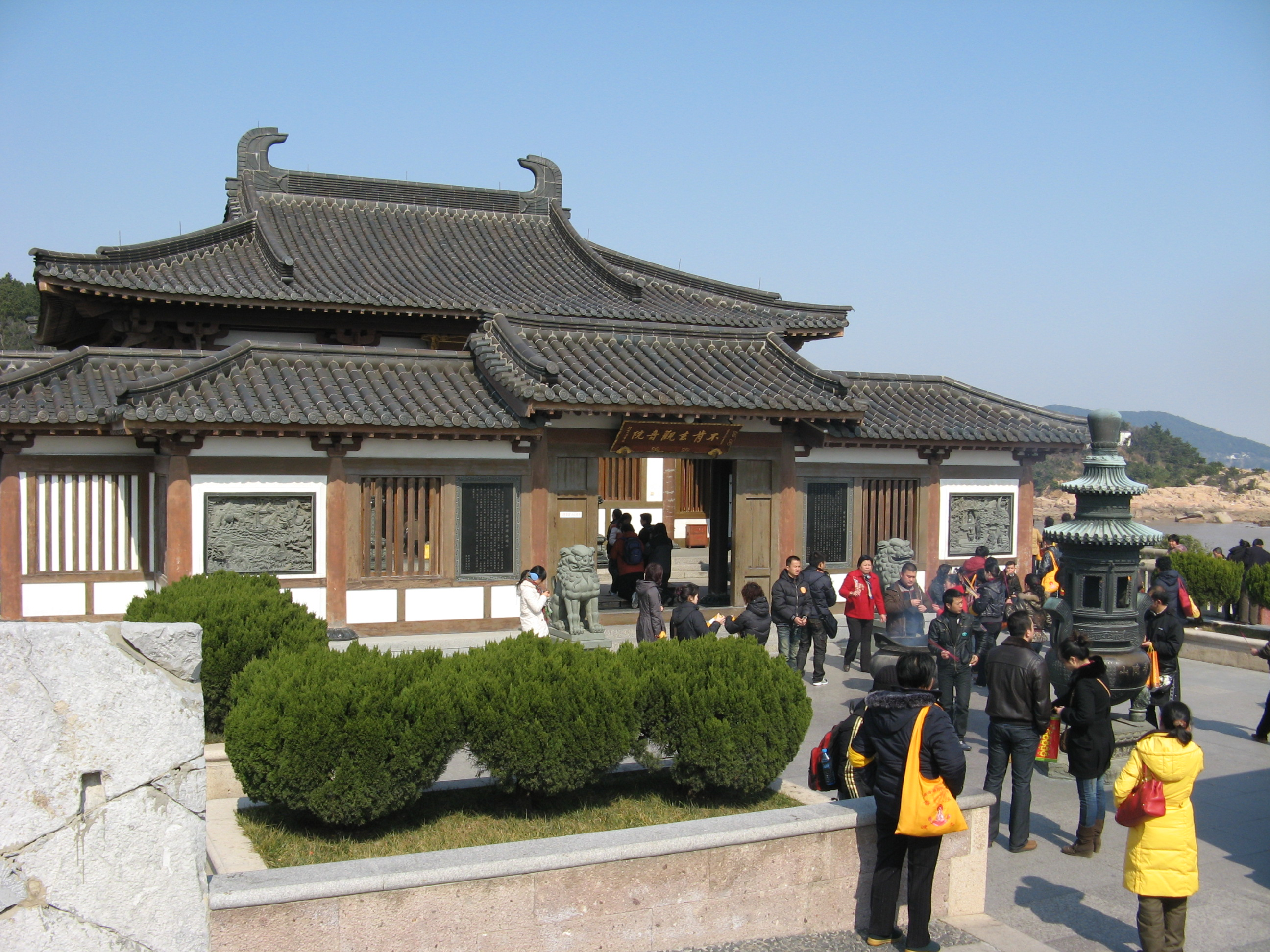
Unwilling-to-Leave Guanyin Temple in Zhoushan, Zhejiang, is dedicated to Guanyin of the Mount Putuo, one of the Four Sacred Mountains of Chinese Buddhism.

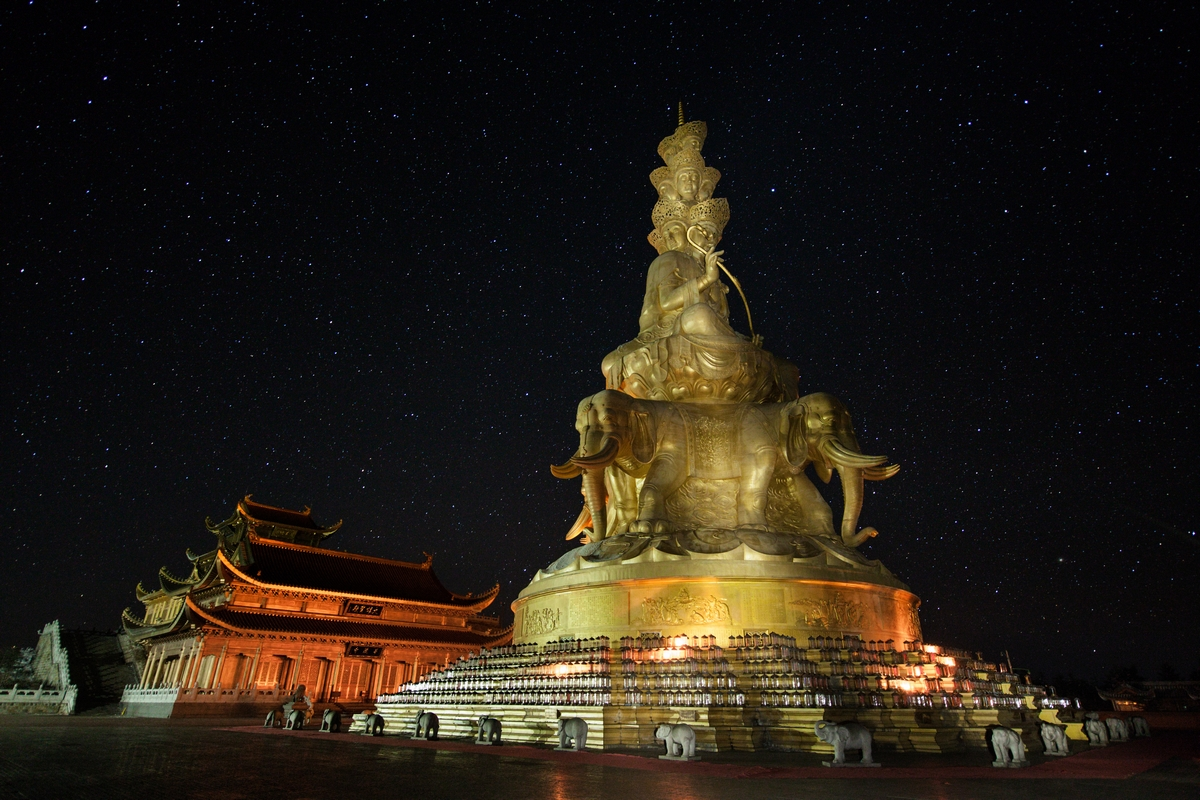
The temple complex with the Ten Directions' Samantabhadra statue at the summit of Mount Emei, in Sichuan. Emei is another sacred mountain of Buddhism.

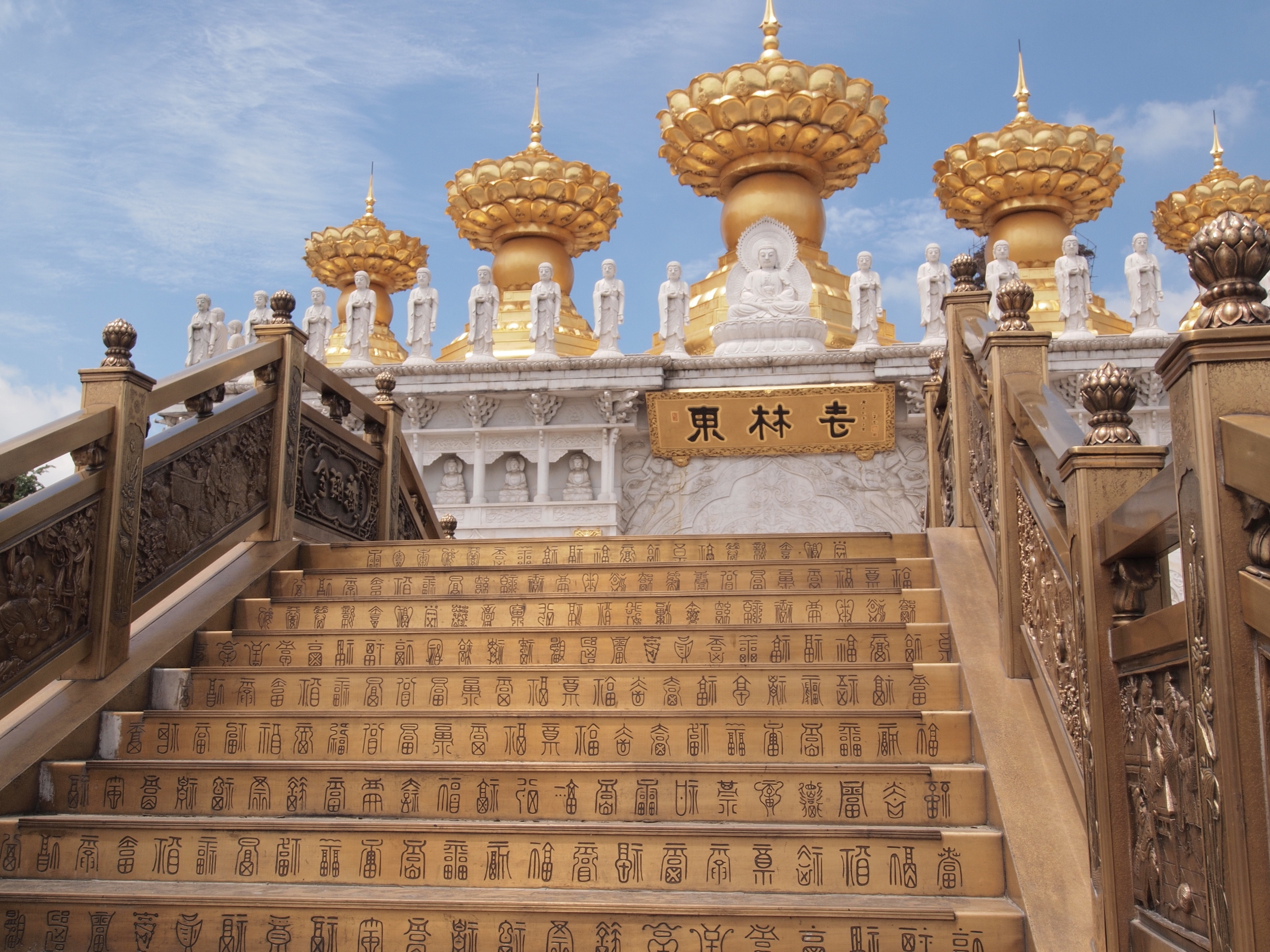
Gateway of the Donglin Temple of Shanghai.

In China, Buddhism (佛教 Fójiào) is represented by a large number of people following the Mahayana, divided between two different cultural traditions, namely the schools of Chinese Buddhism followed by the Han Chinese, and the schools of Tibetan Buddhism followed by Tibetans and Mongols, but also by minorities of Han. The vast majority of Buddhists in China, counted in the hundreds of millions, are Chinese Buddhists, while Tibetan Buddhists are in the number of the tens of millions. Small communities following the Theravada exist among minority ethnic groups who live in the southwestern provinces of Yunnan and Guangxi, bordering Myanmar, Thailand and Laos, but also some among the Li people of Hainan follow such tradition.

With the establishment of the People's Republic of China in 1949, religion came under the control of the new government, and the Buddhist Association of China was founded in 1953. During the Cultural Revolution, Buddhism was suppressed and temples closed or destroyed. Restrictions lasted until the reforms of the 1980s, when Buddhism began to recover popularity and its place as the largest organised faith in the country. While estimates of the number of Buddhists in China vary, the most recent surveys found an average 10–16% of the population of China claiming a Buddhist affiliation, with even higher percentages in urban agglomerations.

==== Han Chinese Buddhism ====
First introduced to China during the Han dynasty and promoted by multiple emperors since then, Han or Chinese Buddhism is a Chinese form of Mahayana Buddhism which draws on the Chinese Buddhist canon as well as numerous Chinese traditions. Chinese Buddhism focuses on studying Mahayana sutras and Mahāyāna treatises and draws its main doctrines from these sources. Some of the most important scriptures in Chinese Buddhism include: Lotus Sutra, Flower Ornament Sutra, Vimalakirtī Sutra, Nirvana Sutra, and Amitābha Sutra. Chinese Buddhism is the largest institutionalized religion in mainland China. Currently, there are an estimated 185 to 250 million Chinese Buddhists in the People's Republic of China.

==== Tibetan Buddhism ====
Tibetan Buddhism evolved as a form of Mahayana Buddhism stemming from the later stages of Buddhism (which included many Vajrayana elements). It thus preserves many Nepali Buddhist and Indian Buddhist tantric practices of the post-Gupta early medieval period (500–1200 CE), along with numerous native Tibetan developments. In the pre-modern era, Tibetan Buddhism spread outside of Tibet primarily due to the influence of the Mongol Yuan dynasty (1271–1368), founded by Kublai Khan, who ruled China, Mongolia, and parts of Siberia. In the modern era, practitioners of Tibetan Buddhism can be found in the Chinese autonomous regions of Inner Mongolia and Xinjiang, in addition to the areas around the Tibetan Plateau.

==== Theravada Buddhism ====
Theravada Buddhism is the oldest existing school of Buddhism, which is practiced mainly in the Yunnan region of China, by ethnic minorities such as the Tai-speaking Dai people. According to historical records, Theravada Buddhism was brought from Myanmar to Yunnan in the mid-7th century. At first, the classics were transmitted only by word of mouth. Around the 11th century, Buddhist sutras were introduced to Xishuangbanna through Burma. Currently, Theravada Buddhism in Yunnan can be divided into four schools: Run, Baozhuang, Duolie, and Zuozhi.

==== Other forms of Buddhism ====
Besides Tibetan Buddhism and the Vajrayana streams found within Chinese Buddhism, Vajrayana Buddhism is practised in China in some other forms. For instance, Azhaliism (Chinese: 阿吒力教 Āzhālìjiào) is a Vajrayana Buddhist religion practised among the Bai people. The Vajrayana current of Chinese Buddhism is known as Tangmi (唐密 "Tang Mysteries"), as it flourished in China during the Tang dynasty (618–907) just before the great suppression of Buddhism by imperial decision. Another name for this body of traditions is "Han Chinese Transmission of the Esoteric (or Mystery) Tradition" (汉传密宗 Hànchuán Mìzōng, where Mizong is the Chinese for Vajrayana). Tangmi, together with the broader religious tradition of Tantrism (in Chinese: 怛特罗 Dátèluō or 怛特罗密教 Dátèluó mìjiào; which may include Hindu forms of religion) has undergone a revitalisation since the 1980s together with the overall revival of Buddhism.

== Ethnic minorities' indigenous religions ==
Various Chinese non-Han minority populations practise unique indigenous religions. The government of China protects and valorises the indigenous religions of minority ethnicities as the foundations of their culture and identity.

=== Benzhuism (Bai) ===
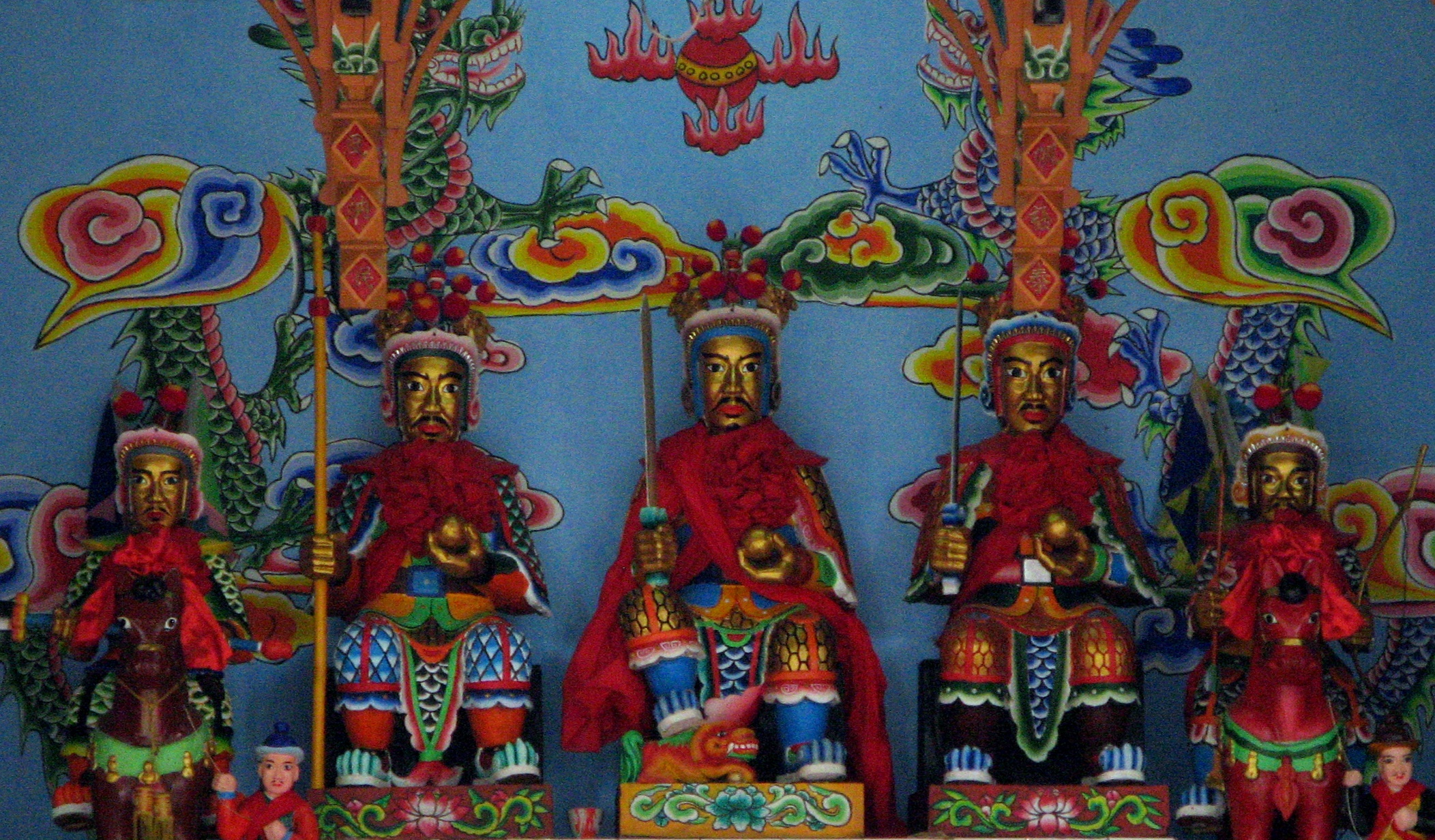
The pan-Chinese Sanxing (Three Star Gods) represented in Bai iconographic style at a Benzhu temple on Jinsuo Island, in Dali, Yunnan.

Benzhuism (本主教 Běnzhǔjiào, "religion of the patrons") is the indigenous religion of the Bai people, an ethnic group of Yunnan. It consists in the worship of the ngel zex, Bai word for "patrons" or "source lords", rendered as benzhu (本主) in Chinese. They are local gods and deified ancestors of the Bai nation. Benzhuism is very similar to Han Chinese religion.

=== Bimoism (Yi) ===
Bimoism (毕摩教 Bìmójiào) is the indigenous religion of the Yi people, the largest ethnic group in Yunnan after the Han Chinese. This faith is represented by three types of religious specialists: the bimo (毕摩, "ritual masters", "priests"), the sunyi (male shamans) and the monyi (female shamans).

What distinguishes the bimo and the shamans is the way through which they acquire their authority. While both are regarded as the "mediators between humanity and the divine", the shamans are initiated through a "spiritual inspiration" (which involves illness or vision) whereas the bimo—who are always males with few exceptions—are literates, who may read and write traditional Yi script, have a tradition of theological and ritual scriptures, and are initiated through a tough educational process.

Since the 1980s, Bimoism has undergone a comprehensive revitalization, both on the popular level and on the scholarly level, with the bimo now celebrated as an "intellectual class" whose role is that of creators, preservers and transmitters of Yi high culture. Since the 1990s, Bimoism has undergone an institutionalization, starting with the foundation of the Bimo Culture Research Center in Meigu County in 1996. The founding of the centre received substantial support from local authorities, especially those whose families were directly affiliated with one of the many bimo hereditary lineages. Since then, large temples and ceremonial complexes for Bimoist practices have been built.

=== Bon (Tibetans) ===
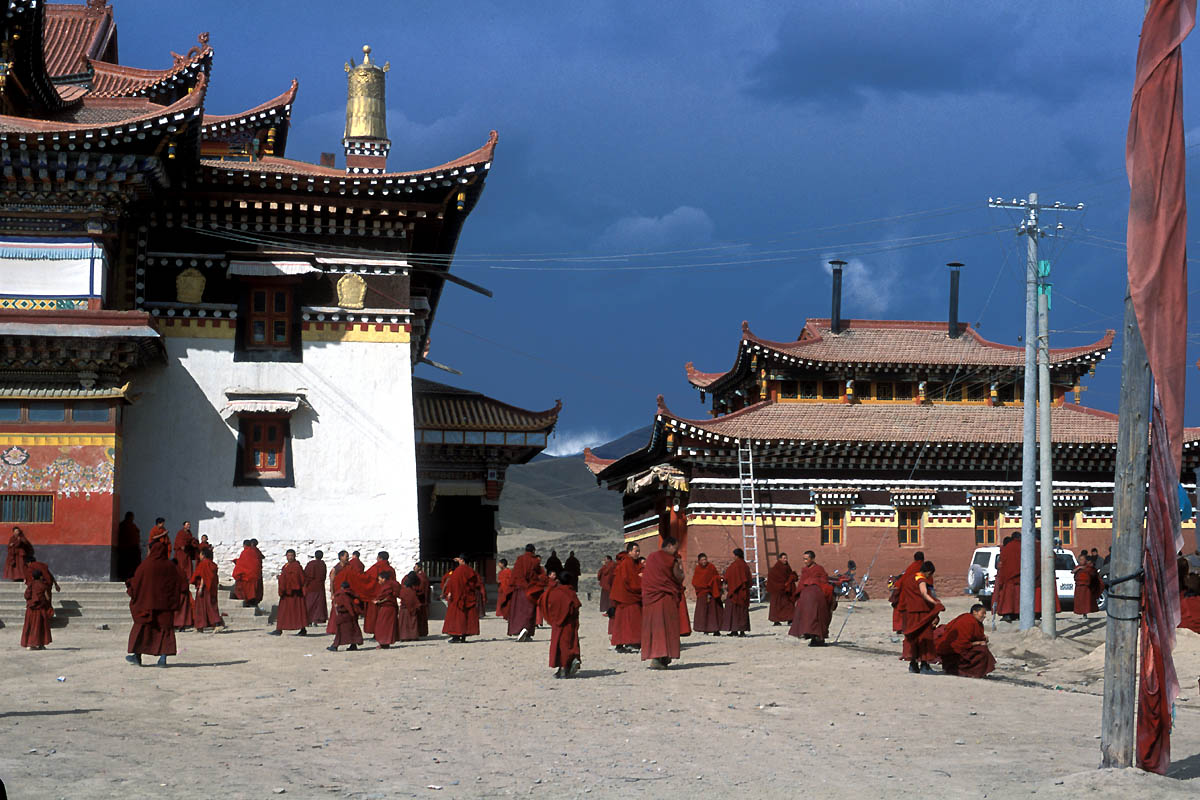
The Narshi Gompa, a Bonpo monastery in Aba, Sichuan.

"Bon" (Tibetan: བོན་; Chinese: 苯教 Běnjiào) is the post-Buddhist name of the pre-Buddhist folk religion of Tibet. Buddhism spread into Tibet starting in the 7th and 8th century, and the name "Bon" was adopted as the name of the indigenous religion in Buddhist historiography. Originally, bon was the title of the shamans of the Tibetan indigenous religion. This is in analogy with the names of the priests of the folk religions of other peoples related to the Tibetans, such as the dong ba of the Nakhi or the bø of Mongolians and other Siberian peoples. Bonpo ("believers of Bon") claim that the word bon means "truth" and "reality".

The spiritual source of Bon is the mythical figure of Tonpa Shenrab Miwoche. Since the late 10th century, the religion then designated as "Bon" started to organise itself adopting the style of Tibetan Buddhism, including a monastic structure and a Bon Canon (Kangyur), which made it a codified religion. The Chinese sage Confucius is worshipped in Bon as a holy king, master of magic and divination.

=== Dongbaism (Nakhi) ===
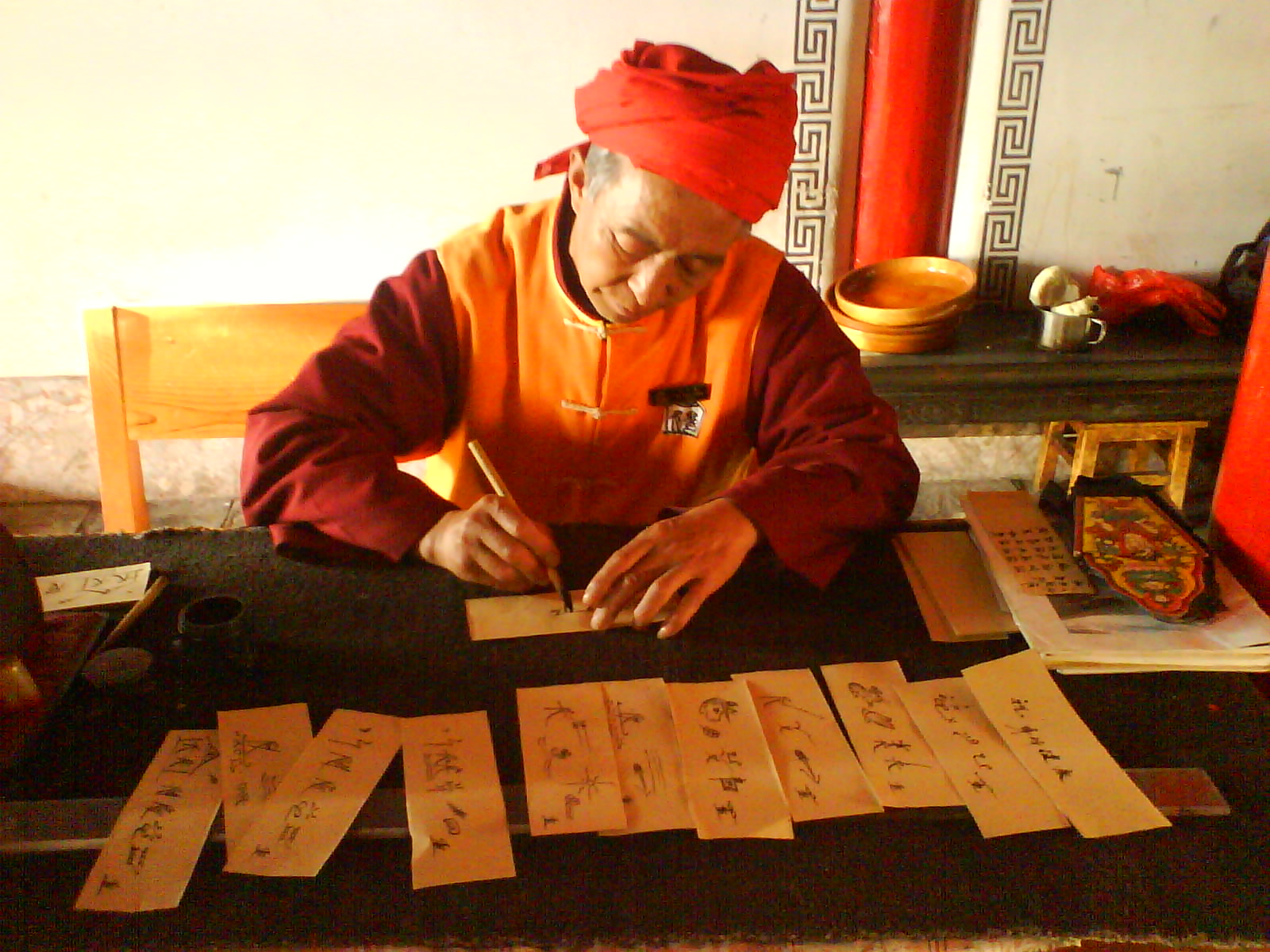
Dongba priest writing oracles with calam in Dongba script, at a Dongba temple near Lijiang

Dongbaism (東巴教 Dōngbajiào, "religion of the eastern Ba") is the main religion of the Nakhi people. The "dongba" ("eastern ba") are masters of the culture, literature and the script of the Nakhi. They originated as masters of the Tibetan Bon religion ("Ba" in Nakhi language), many of whom, in times of persecution when Buddhism became the dominant religion in Tibet, were expelled and dispersed to the eastern marches settling among Nakhi and other eastern peoples.

Dongbaism historically formed as beliefs brought by Bon masters commingled with older indigenous Nakhi beliefs. Dongba followers believe in a celestial shaman called Shi-lo-mi-wu, with little doubt the same as the Tibetan Shenrab Miwo. They worship nature and generation, in the form of many heavenly gods and spirits, chthonic Shu (spirits of the earth represented in the form of chimera-dragon-serpent beings), and ancestors.

=== Manchu folk religion ===
Manchu folk religion is the ethnic religion practised by most of the Manchu people, the major of the Tungusic peoples, in China. It may also be called "Manchu Shamanism" (满族萨满教 Mǎnzú sàmǎnjiào) by virtue of the word "shaman" being originally from Tungusic šamán ("man of knowledge"), later applied by Western scholars to similar religious practices in other cultures.

It is a pantheistic system, believing in a universal God called Apka Enduri ("God of Heaven") that is the omnipotent and omnipresent source of all life and creation. Deities (enduri) enliven every aspect of nature, and the worship of these gods is believed to bring favour, health and prosperity. Many of the deities are original Manchu kins' ancestors, and people with the same surname are viewed as being generated by the same god.

=== Miao folk religion ===
Most Miao people in China have retained their traditional folk religion. It is pantheistic and deeply influenced by Chinese religion, sharing the concept of yin and yang representing, respectively, the realm of the gods in potentiality and the manifested or actual world of living things as a complementary duality.

The Miao believe in a supreme universal God, Saub, who may be defined a deus otiosus who created reality and left it to develop according to its ways, but nonetheless may be appealed in times of need. He entrusted a human, Siv Yis, with healing powers so that he became the first shaman. After his death, Siv Yis ascended to heaven, but he left behind his ritual tools that became the equipment of the shaman class. They (txiv neeb) regard Siv Yis as their archetype and identify as him when they are imbued by the gods.

Various gods (dab or neeb, the latter defining those who work with shamans) enliven the world. Among them, the most revered are the water god Dragon King (Zaj Laug), the Thunder God (Xob), the gods of life and death (Ntxwj Nyug and Nyuj Vaj Tuam Teem), Lady Sun (Nkauj Hnub) and Lord Moon (Nraug Hli), and various deified human ancestors.

=== Mongolian folk religion ===
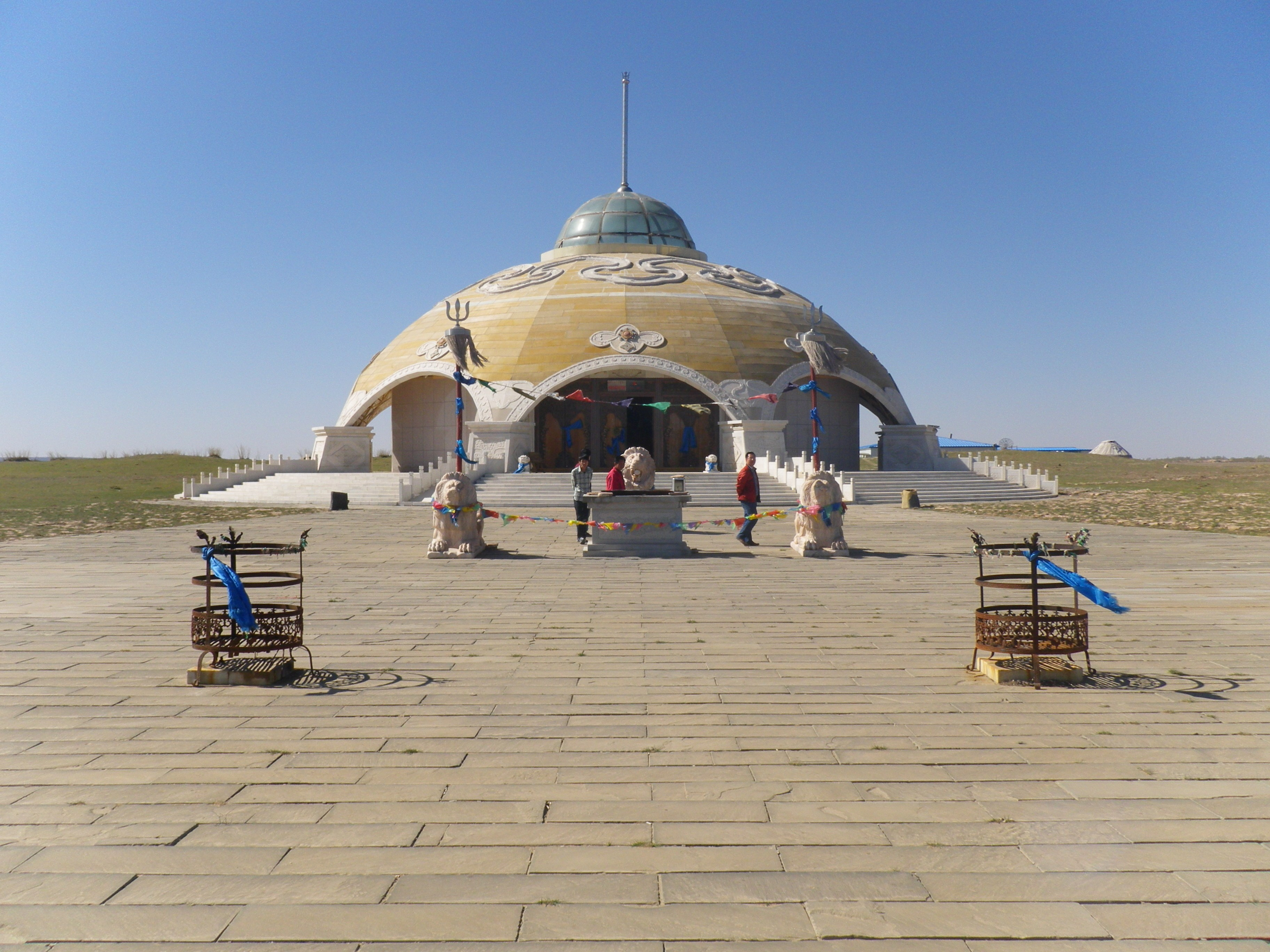
Temple of the White Sulde of Genghis Khan in the town of Uxin in Inner Mongolia, in the Ordos Desert. The worship of Genghis is shared by Chinese and Mongolian folk religion.

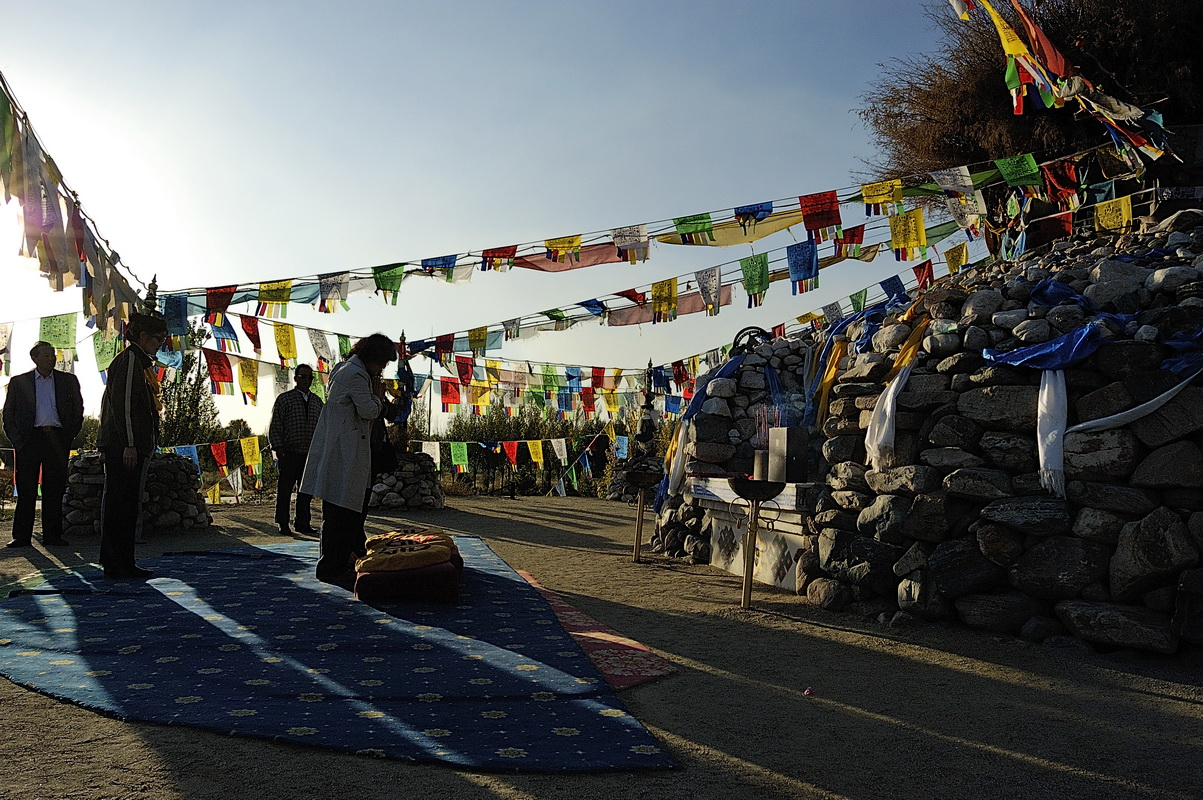
A woman worships at an aobao in Baotou, Inner Mongolia

Mongolian folk religion, alternatively named Tengerism (腾格里教 Ténggélǐjiào), is the native and major religion among the Mongols of China, mostly residing in the region of Inner Mongolia.

It is centered on the worship of gods called tngri, and the Qormusta Tengri, the highest such deity. In Mongolian folk religion, Genghis Khan is considered one of the embodiments, if not the most important, of the Tenger. In worship, communities of lay believers are led by shamans (called böge if males, iduγan if females), who are intermediaries of the divine.

Since the 1980s there has been an unprecedented development of Mongolian folk religion in Inner Mongolia, including böge, the cult of Genghis Khan and the Heaven in special temples, many of which built to resemble yurts, and the cult of aobao as ancestral shrines. Han Chinese of Inner Mongolia have easily assimilated into the spiritual heritage of the region. The cult of Genghis is also shared by the Han, claiming his spirit as the founding principle of the Yuan dynasty.

敖包; áobāo are sacrificial altars of the shape of axis mundi that are traditionally used for worship by Mongols and related ethnic groups. Every aobao represents a god; there are aobaoes dedicated to heavenly gods, mountain gods, other gods of nature, and also to gods of human lineages and agglomerations.

The aobaoes for worship of ancestral gods may be private shrines of an extended family or kin, otherwise they are common to villages, banners or leagues. Sacrifices to the aobaoes are made offering slaughtered animals, joss sticks, and libations.

=== Qiang folk religion ===
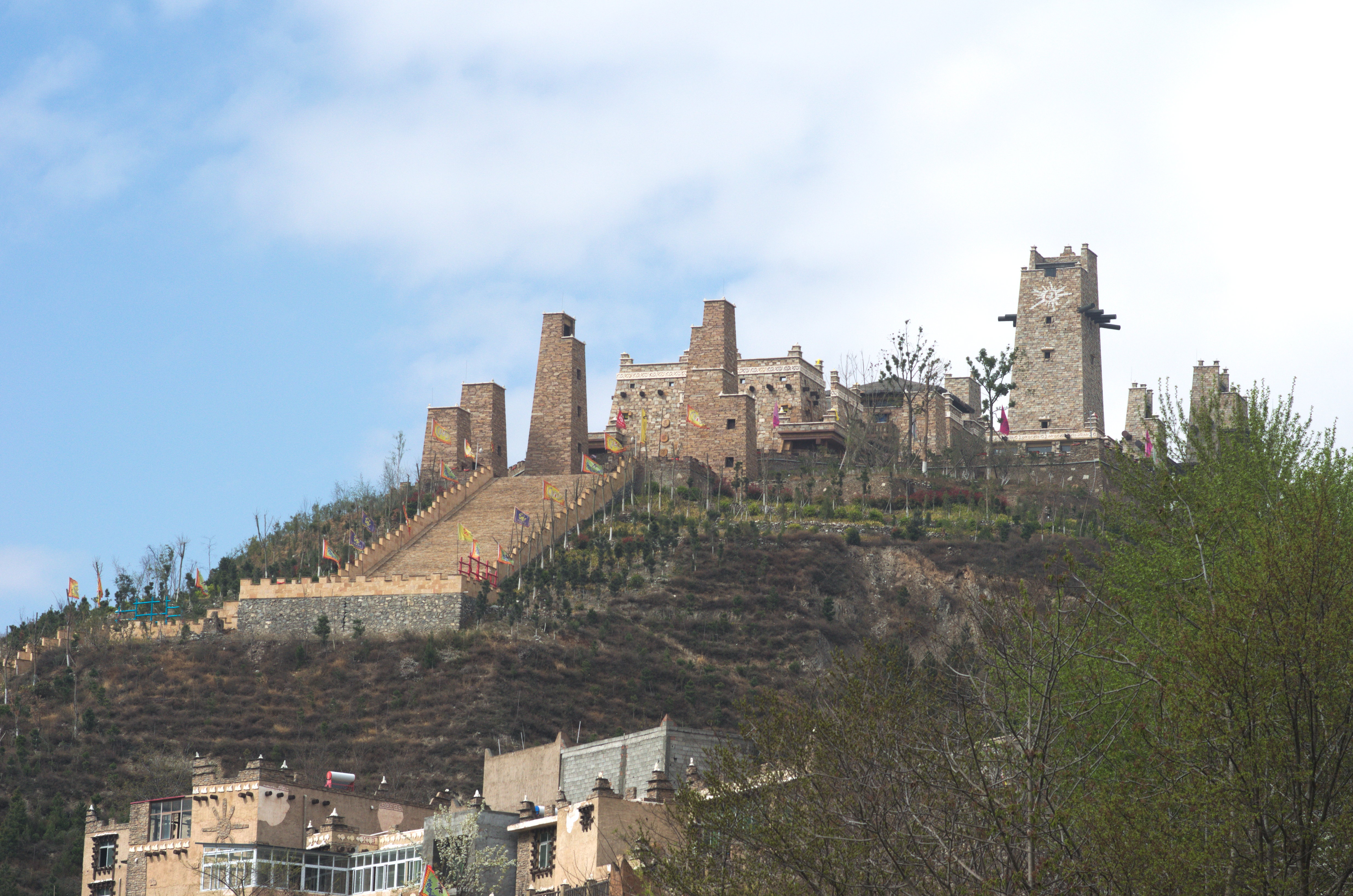
Silver Turtle Temple (银龟神庙 Yínguīshénmiào) is a major centre of Qiang folk religion on Qiangshan, in Mao, Ngawa, Sichuan. (Note: The Silver Turtle Temple (银龟神庙 Yínguīshénmiào) of Qiang folk religion was consecrated in 2014. It is a complex of temples dedicated to various gods: it hosts a Great Temple of Yandi (炎帝大殿 Yándì dàdiǎn), a Great Temple of Dayu (大禹大殿 Dàyǔ dàdiàn) and a Great Temple of Li Yuanhao (李元昊大殿 Lǐyuánhào dàdiàn), considered the most important deities of the Qiang people.)

Qiang people are mostly followers of a native Qiang folk religion. It is pantheistic, involving the worship of a variety of gods of nature and of human affairs, including Qiang progenitors. White stones are worshipped as it is believed that they may be invested with the power of the gods through rituals. Qiang people believe in an overarching God, called Mubyasei ("God of Heaven"), which is related with the Chinese concept of Tian and clearly identified by the Qiang with the Taoist-originated Jade Deity.

Religious ceremonies and rituals are directed by priests called duāngōng in Chinese. They are shamans who acquire their position through years of training with a teacher. Duāngōng are the custodians of Qiang theology, history and mythology. They also administer the coming of age ceremony for 18 years-old boys, called the "sitting on top of the mountain", which involves the boy's entire family going to mountain tops, to sacrifice a sheep or cow and to plant three cypress trees.

Two of the most important religious holidays are the Qiang New Year, falling on the 24th day of the sixth month of the lunar calendar (though now it is fixed on 1 October), and the Mountain Sacrifice Festival, held between the second and the sixth month of the lunar calendar. The former festival is to worship the God of Heaven, while the latter is dedicated to the god of mountains.

=== Yao folk religion ===
The Yao people, who reside in and around Guangxi and Hunan, follow a folk religion that is deeply integrated with Taoism since the 13th century, so much that it is frequently defined as "Yao Taoism". Yao folk religion was described by a Chinese scholar of the half of the 20th century as an example of deep "Taoisation" (道教化 Dàojiàohuà). In the 1980s it was found that the Yao clearly identified themselves with Chinese-language Taoist theological literature, seen as a prestigious statute of culture.

The reason of such strong identification of Yao religion with Taoism is that in Yao society every male adult is initiated as a Taoist. Yao Taoism is therefore a communal religion, not identifying just a class of priests but the entire body of the society; this contrasts with Chinese Taoism, which mostly developed as a collection of sacerdotal orders. The shared sense of Yao identity is further based on tracing back Yao origins to a mythical ancestor, Panhu.

=== Zhuang folk religion ===
Zhuang folk religion, sometimes called Moism (摩教; Mójiào) or Shigongism (师公教; Shīgōngjiào; 'religion of the ancestral father'), after two of its forms, is practised by most of the Zhuang people, the largest ethnic minority of China, who live mainly throughout Guangxi. It is polytheistic, monistic, and shamanic, centred on a creator god, usually expressed as the mythical Buluotuo, progenitor of the Zhuang. Beliefs are codified into mythology and the sacred he "Buluotuo Epic" scripture. A similar religion by the same name is practised by the Buyei people, who are related to the Zhuang. Since the 1980s, there has been a revival of Zhuang folk religion, which has followed two directions. The first is a grass-roots revival of cults dedicated to local deities and ancestors, led by shamans; the second way is a promotion of the religion on the institutional level, through a standardisation of Moism elaborated by Zhuang government officials and intellectuals.

Zhuang religion is intertwined with Taoism. Chinese scholars divide the Zhuang religion into several categories including Shigongism, Moism, Daogongism, and shamanism, according to the type of specialists conducting the rites. "Shigongism" refers to the dimension led by the shigong (师公) ritual specialists, variously translated as 'ancestral father' or 'teaching master', and which refers both to the principle of the Universe and to men able to represent it. Shigong specialists dance in masks and worship the Three Primordials: the generals Tang, Ge and Zhou. "Moism" refers to the dimension led by mogong (摩公), vernacular ritual specialists able to transcribe and read texts written in Zhuang characters and lead the worship of Buluotuo and the goddess Muliujia. "Daogongism" is Zhuang Taoism, the indigenous religion of Zhuang Taoists, known as daogong (道公 'lords of the Tao') in Zhuang. Zhuang shamanism entails the practices of mediums who provide direct communication between the material and the spiritual worlds; these shamans are known as momoed if female and gemoed if male.

== Abrahamic religions ==
=== Christianity ===
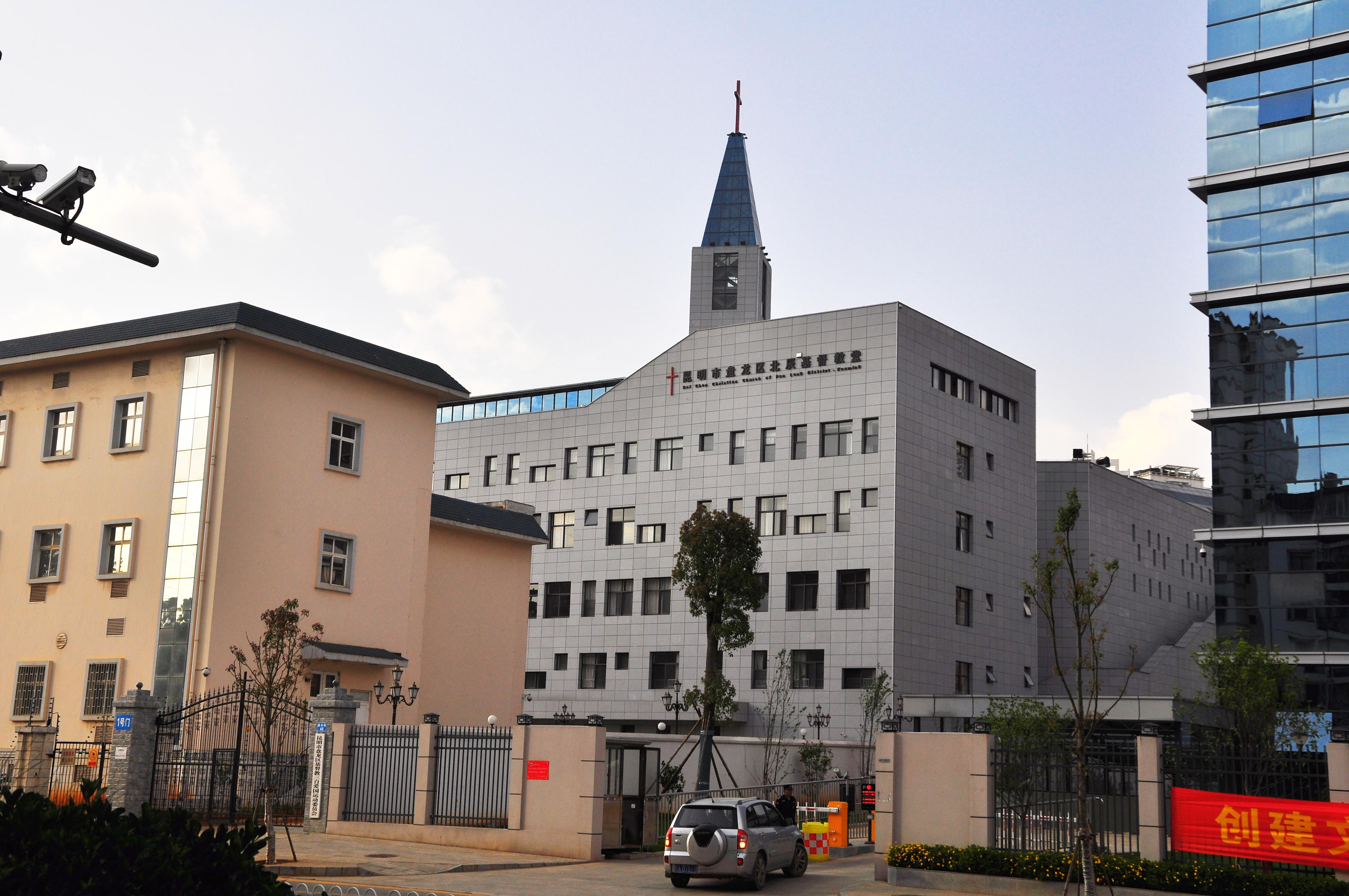
A Protestant church in Kunming, Yunnan

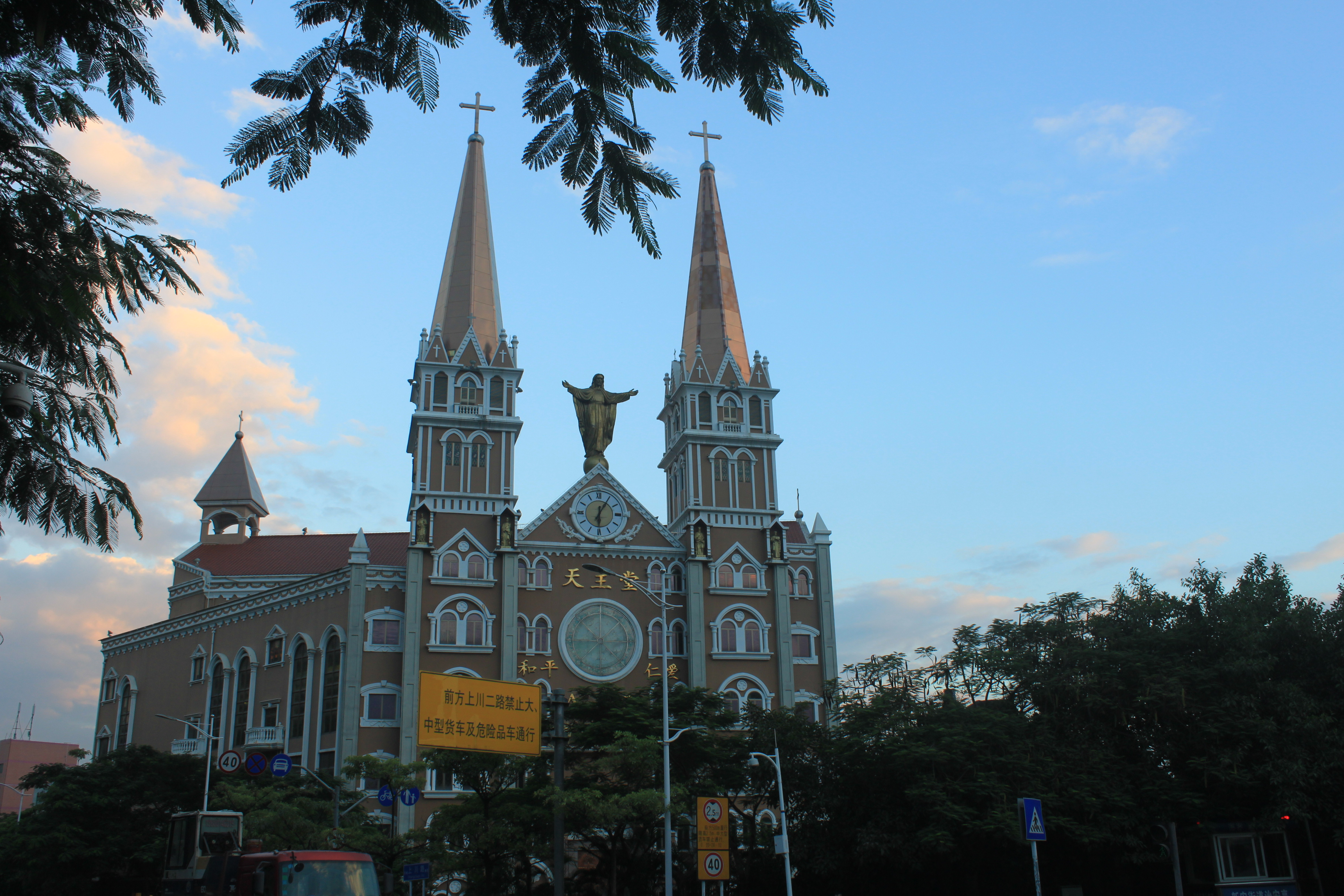
Christ the King Church, a Catholic church in Shenzhen, Guangdong

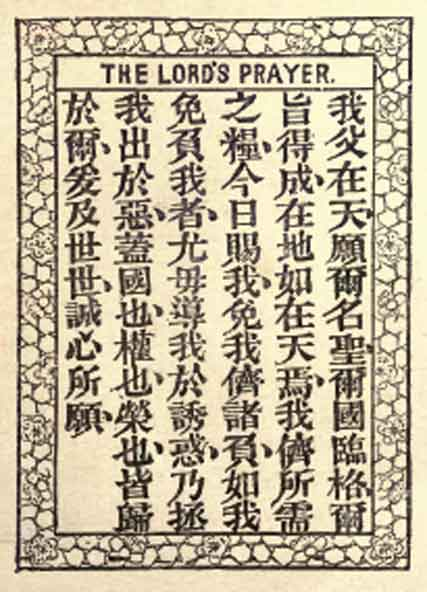
The Lord's Prayer in Classical Chinese (1889).

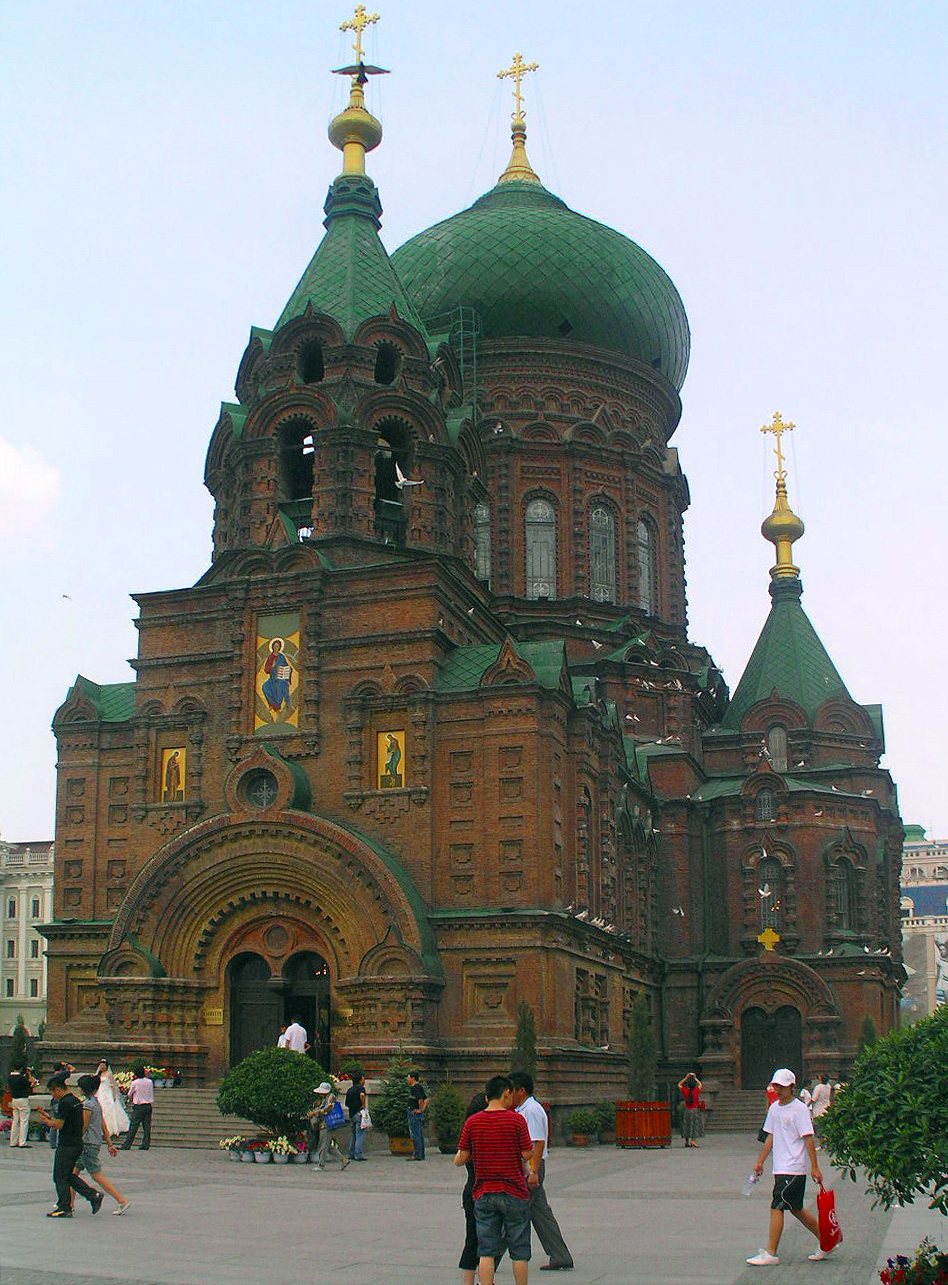
Saint Sophia Cathedral (Russian Orthodox) in Harbin, Heilongjiang

Christianity (基督教 Jīdūjiào, "Religion of Christ") in China comprises Roman Catholicism (天主教 Tiānzhǔjiào, "Religion of the Lord of Heaven"), Protestantism (基督新教 Jīdū Xīnjiào, "New-Christianity"), and a small number of Eastern Orthodoxy (東正教 Zhèngjiào). Mormonism (摩门教 Móménjiào) also has a tiny presence. The Orthodox Church, which has believers among the Russian minority and some Chinese in the far northeast and far northwest, is officially recognized in Heilongjiang. The category of "Protestantism" in China also comprehends a variety of heterodox sects of Christian inspiration, including Zhushenism (主神教 Zhǔshénjiào, "Church of Lord God"), Linglingism (灵灵教 Línglíngjiào, "Numinous Church"), Fuhuodao, the Church of the Disciples (门徒会 Méntúhuì) and Eastern Lightning or the Church of Almighty God (全能神教 Quánnéngshénjiào).

Christianity existed in China as early as the 7th century, living multiple cycles of significant presence for centuries, then disappearing for other centuries, and then being re-introduced by foreign missionaries. The arrival of the Persian missionary Alopen in 635, during the early period of the Tang dynasty, is considered by some to be the first entry of Christianity in China. What Westerners referred to as Nestorianism flourished for centuries, until Emperor Wuzong of the Tang in 845 ordained that all foreign religions (Buddhism, Christianity and Zoroastrianism) had to be eradicated from the Chinese nation. Christianity was reintroduced in China in the 13th century, in the form of Nestorianism, during the Mongol Yuan dynasty, which also established relations with the papacy, especially through Franciscan missionaries in 1294. When the native Han Chinese Ming dynasty overthrew the Yuan dynasty in the 14th century, Christianity was again expelled from China as a foreign influence.

At the end of the Ming dynasty in the 16th century, Jesuits arrived in Beijing via Guangzhou. The most famous amongst them was Matteo Ricci, an Italian mathematician who came to China in 1588 and lived in Beijing. Ricci was welcomed at the imperial court and introduced Western learning into China. The Jesuits followed a policy of adaptation of Catholicism to traditional Chinese religious practices, especially ancestor worship. However, such practices were eventually condemned as polytheistic idolatry by the popes Clement XI, Clement XII and Benedict XIV. Roman Catholic missions struggled in obscurity for decades afterwards.

Christianity began to take root in a significant way in the late imperial period, during the Qing dynasty, and although it has remained a minority religion in China, it influenced late imperial history. Waves of missionaries came to China in the Qing period as a result of contact with foreign powers. Russian Orthodoxy was introduced in 1715, and Protestant missions began entering China in 1807.

Following the British Empire's defeat of China in the First Opium War (1839–1841), China was required to permit foreign missionaries. The unequal treaties gave European powers jurisdiction over missions and some authority over Chinese Christians.

The Taiping Rebellion (1850–1871) was influenced to some degree by Christian teachings, and the Boxer Rebellion (1899–1901) was in part a reaction against Christianity in China. Christians in China established the first clinics and hospitals practising modern medicine, and provided the first modern training for nurses. Both Roman Catholics and Protestants founded numerous educational institutions in China from the primary to the university level. Some of the most prominent Chinese universities began as religious institutions. Missionaries worked to abolish practices such as foot binding, and the unjust treatment of maidservants, as well as launching charitable work and distributing food to the poor. They also opposed the opium trade and brought treatment to many who were addicted. Some of the early leaders of the early republic (1912–49), such as Sun Yat-sen, were converts to Christianity and were influenced by its teachings. By 1921, Harbin, the northeast's largest city, had a Russian population of around 100,000, constituting a large part of Christianity in the city.

Christianity, especially in its Protestant form, gained momentum in China between the 1980s and the 1990s, but, in the following years, folk religion recovered more rapidly and in greater numbers than Christianity (or Buddhism). The scholar Richard Madsen noted that "the Christian God then becomes one in a pantheon of local gods among whom the rural population divides its loyalties". Similarly, Gai Ronghua and Gao Junhui noted that "Christianity in China is no longer monotheism" and tends to blend with Chinese folk religion, as many Chinese Christians take part in regional activities for the worship of gods and ancestors.

Protestants in the early 21st century, including both official and unofficial churches, had between 25 and 35 million adherents. Catholics were not more than 10 million. In the 2010s the scholarly estimate was of approximately 30 million Christians, of whom fewer than 4 million were Catholics. In the same years, about 40 million Chinese said they believed in Jesus Christ or had attended Christian meetings, but did not identify themselves with the Christian religion. Demographic analyses usually find an average 2–3% of the population of China declaring a Christian affiliation. According to the Pew Forum on Religion & Public Life, before 1949, there were approximately 4 million Christians (3 million Catholics and 1 million Protestants), and by 2010, China had roughly 67 million Christians, representing about 5% of the country's total population. Christians were unevenly distributed geographically, the only provinces in which they constituted a population significantly larger than 1 million persons being Henan, Anhui and Zhejiang. Protestants were characterized by a prevalence of people living in the countryside, women, illiterates and semi-literates, and elderly people. While according to the Yu Tao survey the Catholic population were characterized by a prevalence of men, wealthier, better educated, and young people. A 2017 study on the Christian community of Wuhan found the same socio-economic characteristics, with the addition that Christians were more likely than the general population to suffer from physical and mental illness. In 2018, the government published a report saying that there are over 44 million Christians (38M Protestants; 6M Catholics) in China.

A significant number of members of churches unregistered with the government, and of their pastors, belong to the Koreans of China. Christianity has a strong presence in the Yanbian Korean Autonomous Prefecture, in Jilin. Yanbian Koreans' Christianity has a patriarchal character; Korean churches are usually led by men, in contrast to Chinese churches that most often have female leadership. For instance, of the twenty-eight registered churches of Yanji, only three of which are Chinese congregations, all the Korean churches have a male pastor while all the Chinese churches have a female pastor. Also, Korean church buildings are stylistically very similar to South Korean churches, with big spires surmounted by red crosses. Yanbian Korean churches have been a matter of controversy for the Chinese government because of their links to South Korean churches.

According to a report by the Singapore Management University, from the 1980s onwards, more people in China and other Asian countries have converted to Christianity, and these new converts are mostly "upwardly mobile, urban, middle-class Chinese". According to the Council on Foreign Relations the "number of Chinese Protestants has grown by an average of 10 percent annually since 1979". According to The Economist, "Protestant Christianity is booming in China". If the current trend continues, China will have the largest Christian population in the world as some have estimated.

In recent decades the CCP has remained intolerant of Christian churches outside party control, looking with distrust on organizations with international ties. The government and Chinese intellectuals tend to associate Christianity with subversive Western values, and many churches have been closed or destroyed. In addition, Western and Korean missionaries are being expelled. Since the 2010s policies against Christianity have been extended also to Hong Kong.

In September 2018, the Holy See and the Chinese government signed the 2018 Holy See-China Agreement, a historic agreement concerning the appointment of bishops in China. The Vatican spokesman Greg Burke described the agreement as "not political but pastoral, allowing the faithful to have bishops who are in communion with Rome but at the same time recognized by Chinese authorities".

As of 2023, there are approximately 44 million Chinese Christians registered with government-approved Christian groups.

=== Islam ===
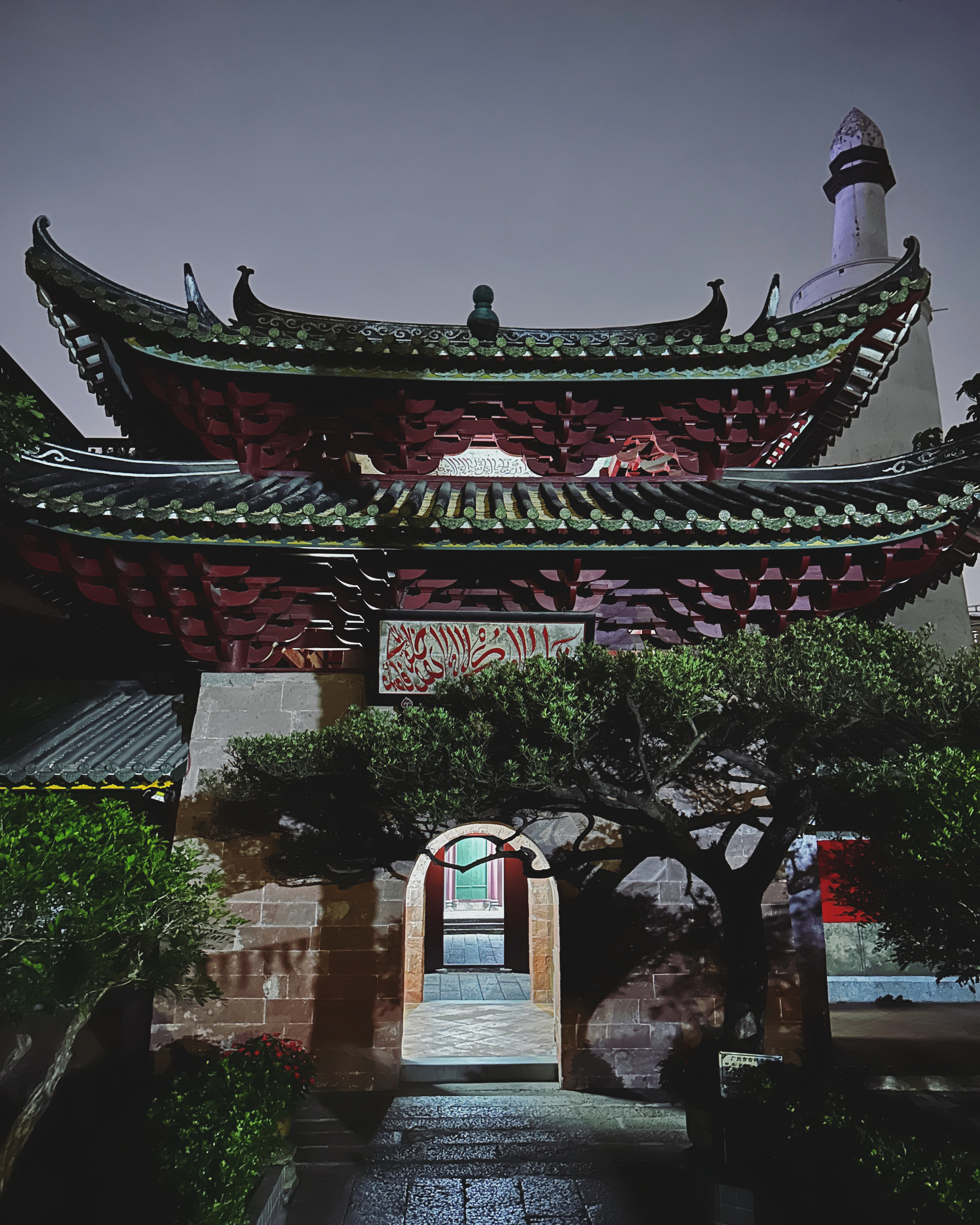
Huaisheng Mosque in Guangzhou, dating back to 627 AD

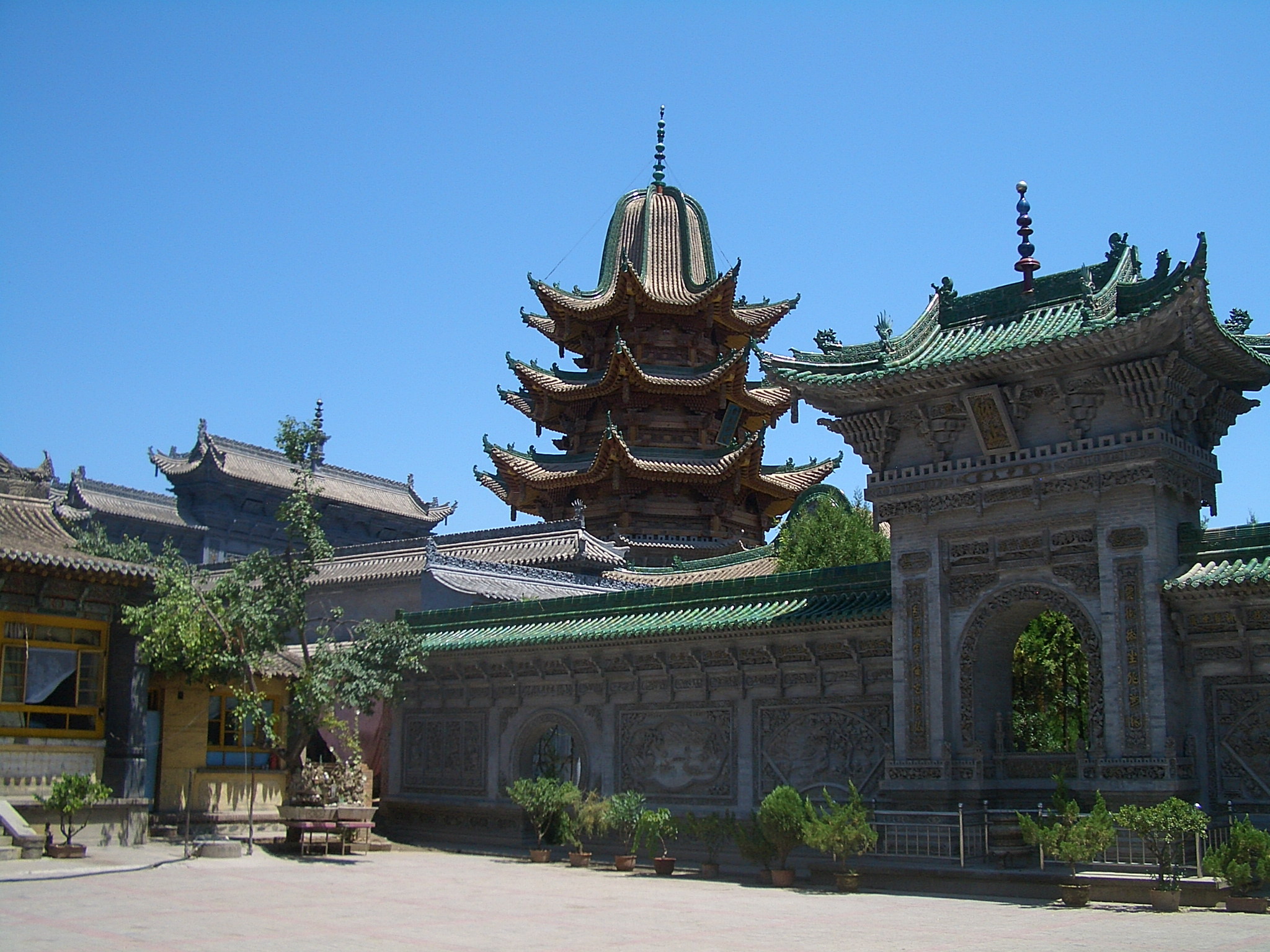
The gongbei (shrine) of the Sufi master Yu Baba in Linxia City, Gansu

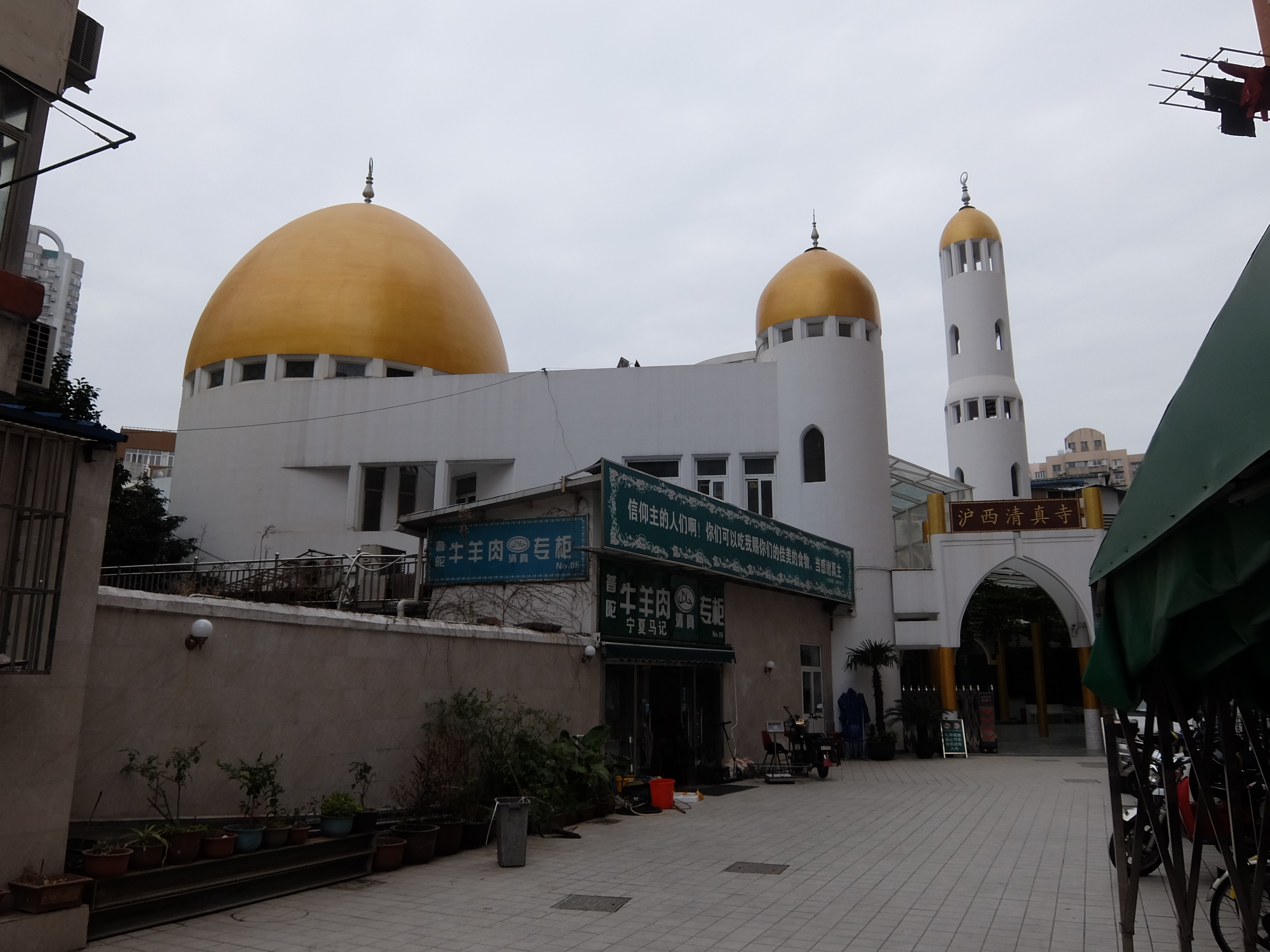
Huxi Mosque and halal shop in Shanghai

The introduction of Islam (伊斯兰教 Yīsīlánjiào or 回教 Huíjiào) in China is traditionally dated back to a diplomatic mission in 651, eighteen years after Muhammad's death, led by Sa'd ibn Abi Waqqas. Emperor Gaozong is said to have shown esteem for Islam and to have founded the Huaisheng Mosque (Memorial Mosque) at Guangzhou, in memory of the Prophet himself.

Muslims, mainly Arabs, travelled to China to trade. In the year 760, the Yangzhou massacre killed large numbers of these traders, and a century later, in the years 878–879, Chinese rebels fatally targeted the Arab community in the Guangzhou massacre. Yet, Muslims virtually came to dominate the import and export industry by the Song dynasty (960–1279). The office of Director General of Shipping was consistently held by a Muslim. Immigration increased during the Yuan dynasty (1271–1368), when hundreds of thousands of Muslims were relocated throughout China for their administrative skills. A Muslim, Yeheidie'erding, led the construction project of the Yuan capital of Khanbaliq, in present-day Beijing.

During the Ming dynasty (1368–1644), Muslims continued to have an influence among the high classes. Hongwu Emperor's most trusted generals were Muslim, including Lan Yu, who led a decisive victory over the Mongols, effectively ending the Mongol dream to re-conquer China. The admiral Zheng He led seven expeditions to the Indian Ocean. The Hongwu Emperor even composed The Hundred-word Eulogy in praise of Muhammad. Muslims who were descended from earlier immigrants began to assimilate by speaking Chinese dialects and by adopting Chinese names and culture, mixing with the Han Chinese. They developed their own cuisine, architecture, martial arts' styles and calligraphy (sini). This era, sometimes considered a Golden Age of Islam in China, also saw Nanjing become an important center of Islamic study.

The rise of the Qing dynasty saw numerous Islamic rebellions, including the Panthay Rebellion which occurred in Yunnan from 1855 to 1873, and the Dungan Revolt, which occurred mostly in Xinjiang, Shaanxi and Gansu from 1862 to 1877. The Manchu government ordered the execution of all rebels, killing a million Muslims after the Panthay Rebellion, and several million after the Dungan Revolt. However, many Muslims like Ma Zhan'ao, Ma Anliang, Dong Fuxiang, Ma Qianling and Ma Julung, defected to the Qing dynasty side and helped the Qing general Zuo Zongtang to exterminate the rebels. These Muslim generals belonged to the Khufiyya sect, while rebels belonged to the Jahariyya sect. In 1895, another Dungan Revolt (1895–96) broke out, and loyalist Muslims like Dong Fuxiang, Ma Anliang, Ma Guoliang, Ma Fulu, and Ma Fuxiang massacred the rebel Muslims led by Ma Dahan, Ma Yonglin, and Ma Wanfu. A few years later, an Islamic army called the Kansu Braves, led by the general Dong Fuxiang, fought for the Qing dynasty against the foreigners during the Boxer Rebellion.

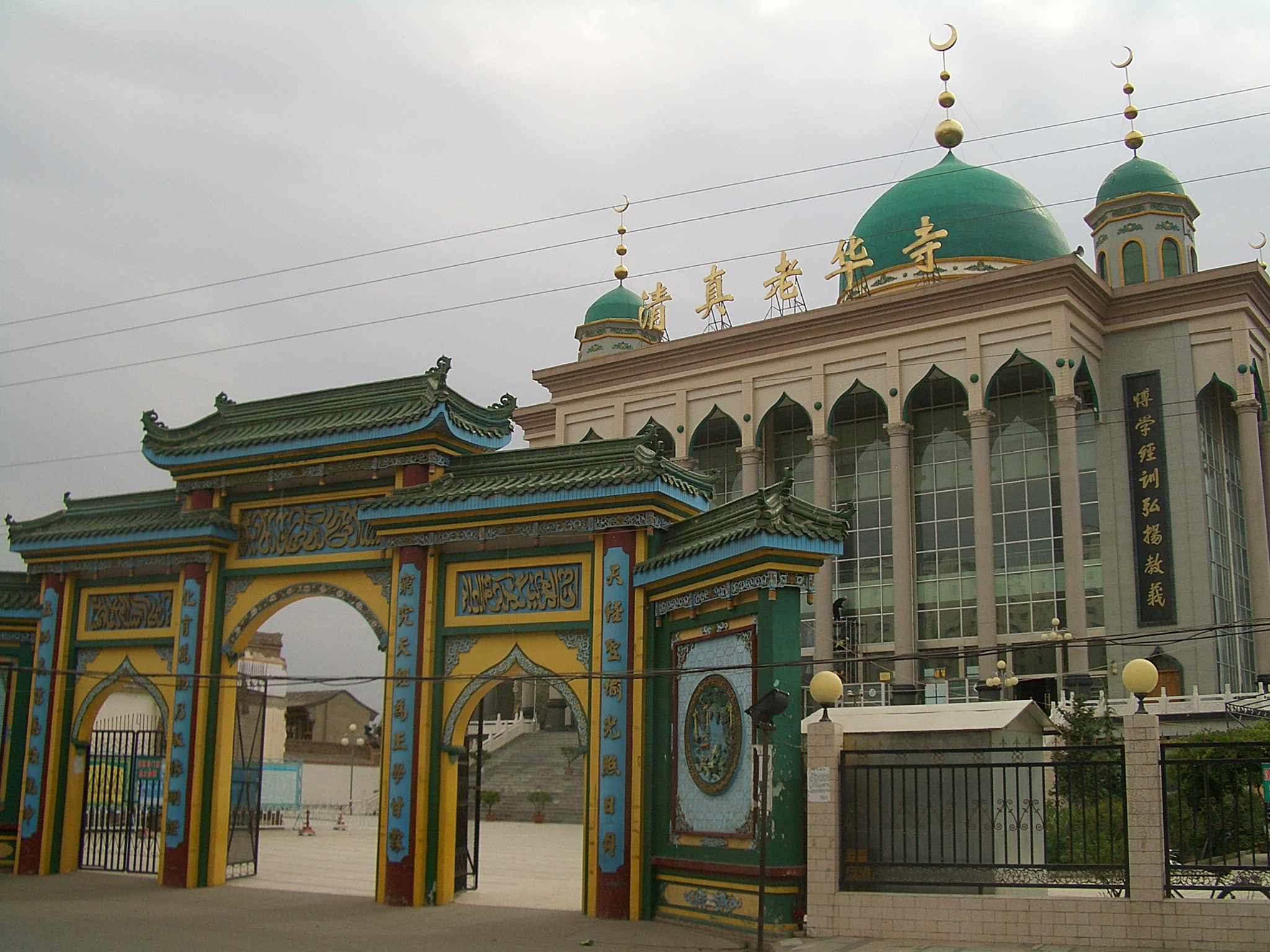
Laohua Mosque in Linxia City, Gansu

After the fall of the Qing, Sun Yat-sen proclaimed that the country belonged equally to the Han, Manchu, Mongol, Tibetan and Hui peoples. In the 1920s, the provinces of Qinghai, Gansu and Ningxia came under the control of Muslim warlords known as the Ma clique, who served as generals in the National Revolutionary Army. During the Cultural Revolution, mosques were often defaced, closed or demolished, and copies of the Quran were destroyed by the Red Guards.

After the 1980s Islam experienced a renewal in China, with an upsurge in Islamic expression and the establishment Islamic associations aimed to coordinate inter-ethnic activities among Muslims. Muslims are found in every province of China, but they constitute a majority only in Xinjiang, and a large amount of the population in Ningxia and Qinghai. Of China's recognised ethnic minorities, ten groups are traditionally Islamic. Accurate statistics on China's Muslim population are hard to find; various surveys found that they constitute 1–2% of the Chinese population, or between 10 and 20 million people. In the 2010s they were served by 35,000 to 45,000 mosques, 40,000 to 50,000 imams (ahong), and 10 Quranic institutions.

=== Judaism ===
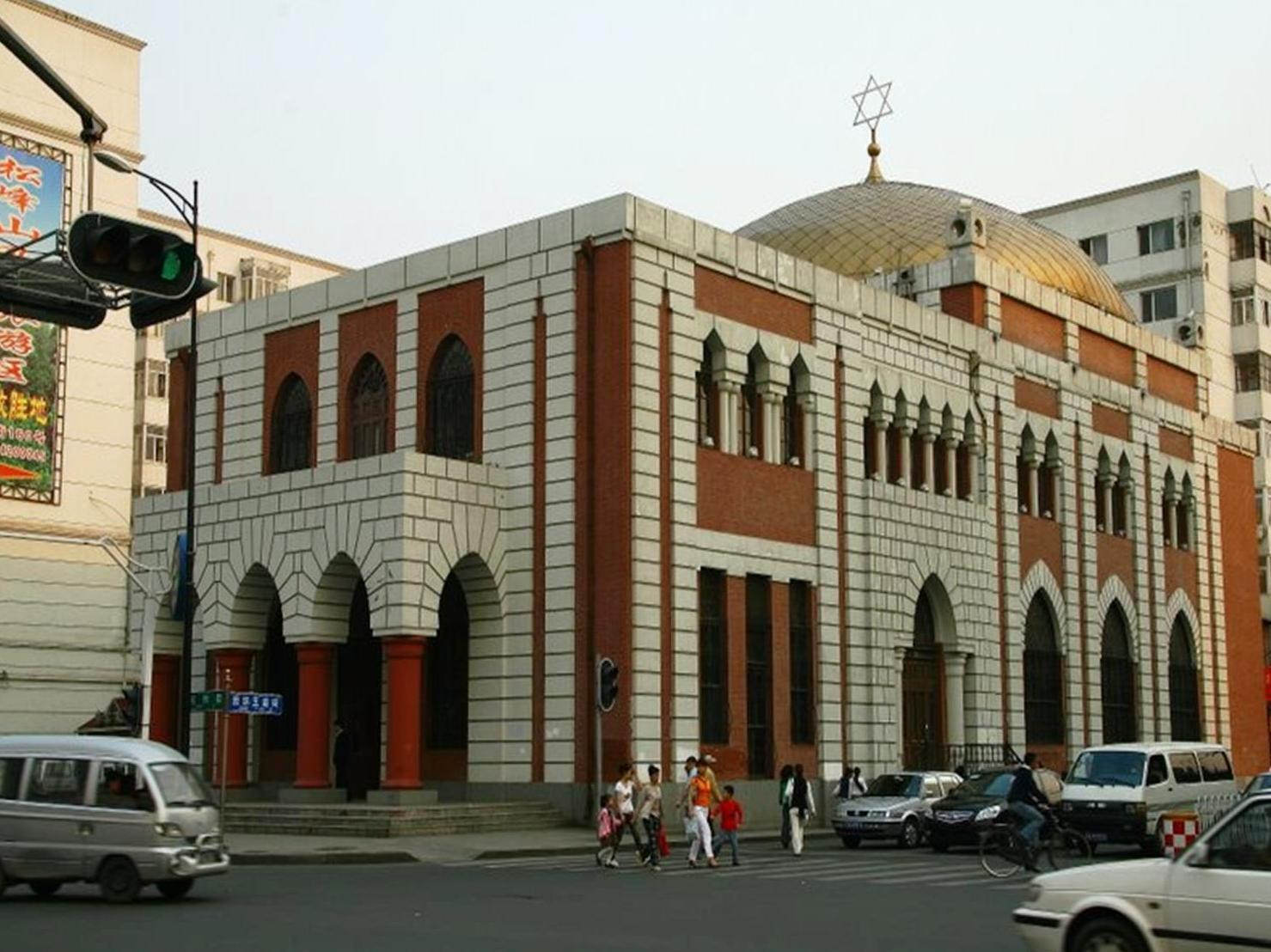
Synagogue of Harbin, Heilongjiang.

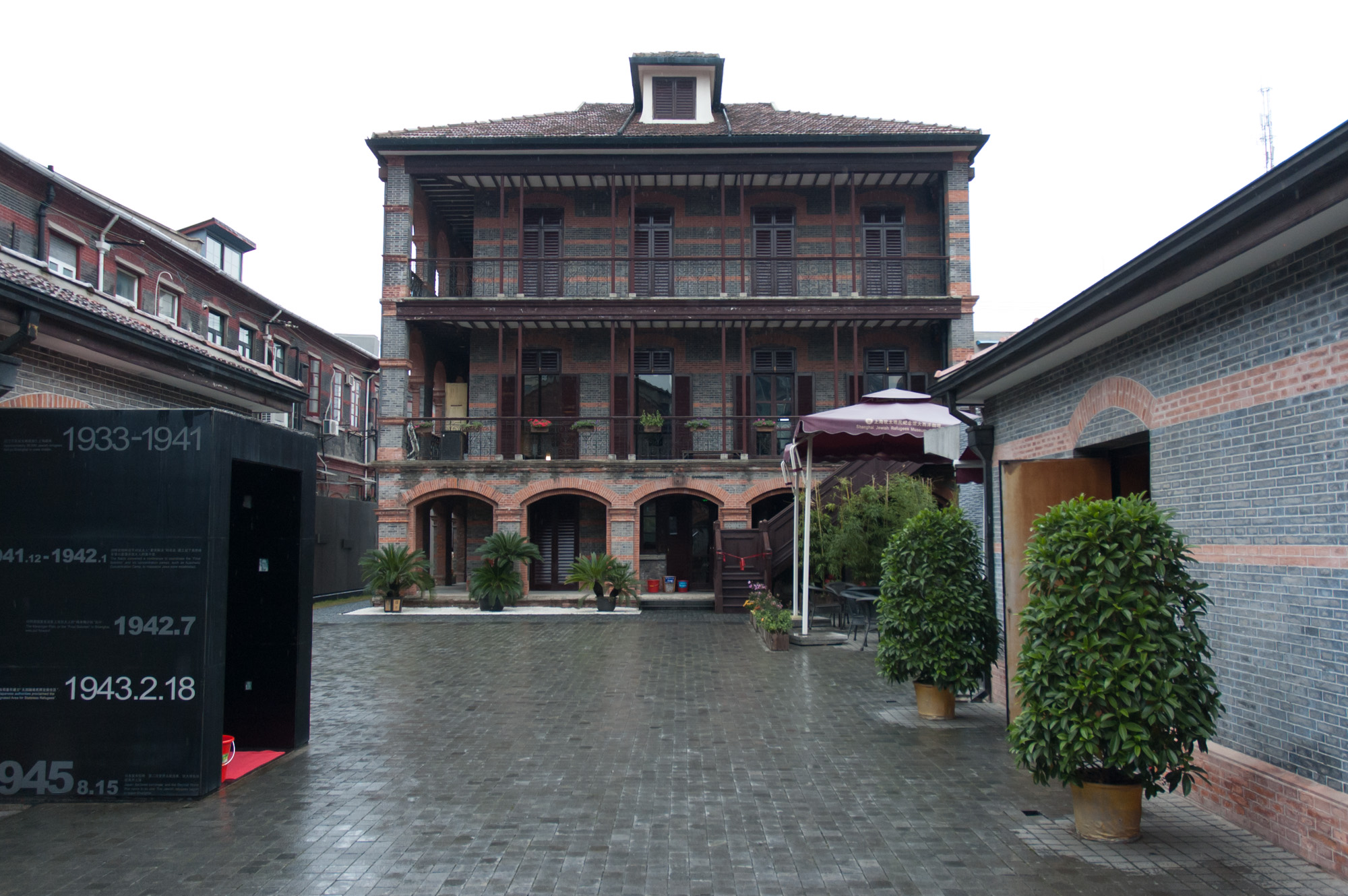
Shanghai Jewish Refugees Museum with former synagogue.

Judaism (犹太教 Yóutàijiào) was introduced during the Tang dynasty (618–907) or earlier, by small groups of Jews settled in China. The most prominent early community were the so-called Kaifeng Jews, in Kaifeng, Henan province. In the 20th century many Jews arrived in Hong Kong, Shanghai, and Harbin, during a period of great economic development of these cities. Many of them sought refuge from anti-Semitic pogroms in the Russian Empire (early 1900s), the communist revolution and civil war in Russia (1917–1918), and anti-Semitic Nazi policy in central Europe, chiefly in Germany and Austria (1937–1940). The last wave of Jewish refugees came from Poland and other eastern European countries in the early 1940s.

Shanghai was particularly notable for its numerous Jewish refugees, who gathered in the so-called Shanghai Ghetto. Most of them left China after the war, the rest relocating prior to, or immediately after, the establishment of the People's Republic. Today, the Kaifeng Jewish community is functionally extinct. Many descendants of the Kaifeng community still live among the Chinese population, mostly unaware of their Jewish ancestry, while some have moved to Israel. Meanwhile, remnants of the later arrivals maintain communities in Shanghai and Hong Kong. In recent years a community has also developed in Beijing through the work of the Chabad-Lubavitch movement.

Since the late 20th century, along with the study of religion in general, the study of Judaism and Jews in China as an academic subject has blossomed with the establishment of institutions such as Diane and Guilford Glazer Institute of Jewish Studies and the China Judaic Studies Association.

=== Baháʼí Faith ===
The Baháʼí Faith (巴哈伊信仰 Bāhāyī xìnyǎng, 巴哈伊教 Bāhāyījiào, or, in old translations, 大同教 Dàtóngjiào) has had a presence in China since the 19th century.

== Dharmic religions ==
=== Hinduism ===
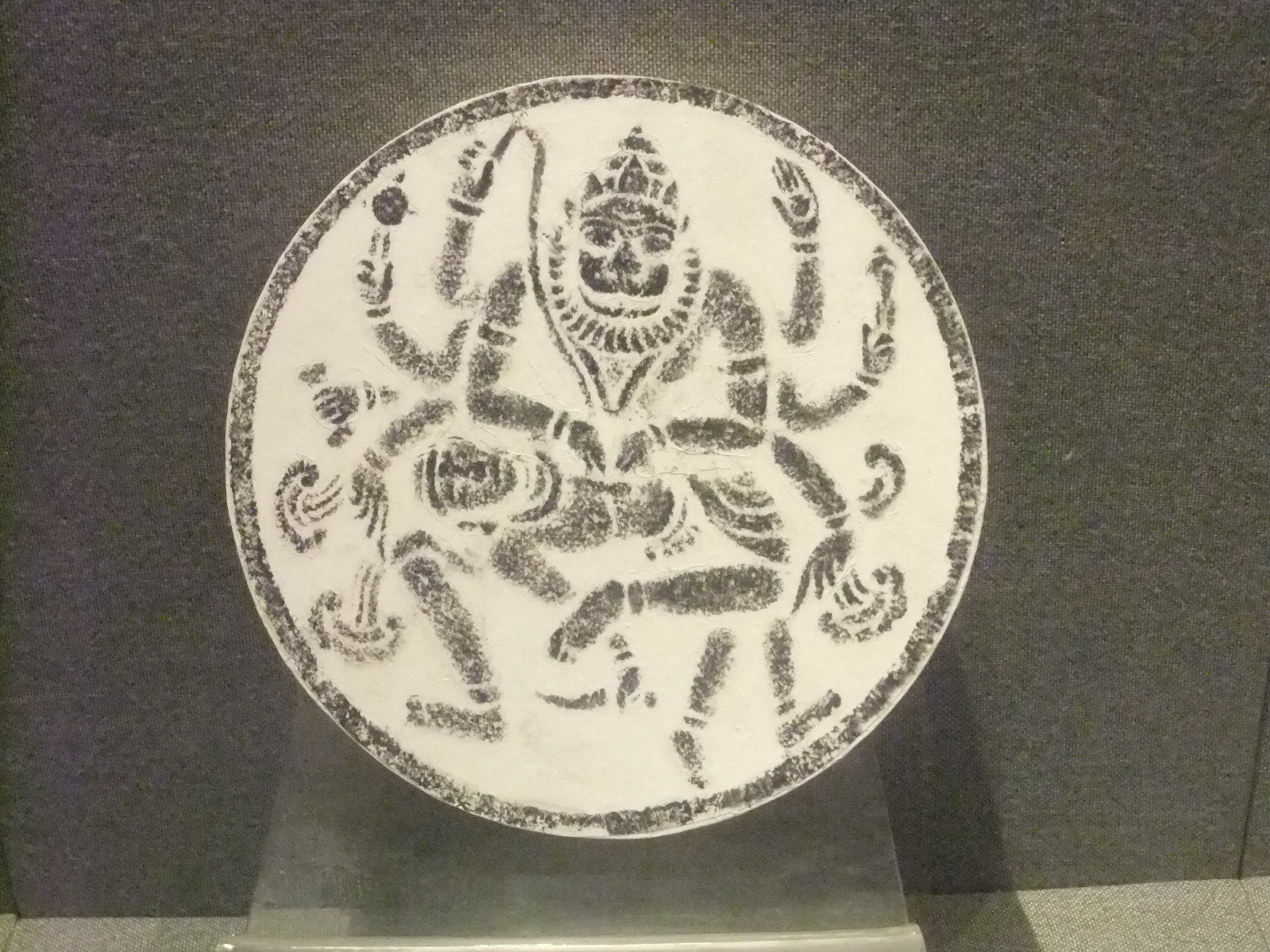
Relief of the Hindu god Narasimha shown at the museum of Quanzhou.

Hinduism (印度教 Yìndùjiào) entered China around the same time as Buddhism, generally imported by Indian merchants, from different routes. One of them was the "Silk Route by Sea" that started from the Coromandel Coast in southeast India and reached Southeast Asia and then southeastern Chinese cities; another route was that from the ancient kingdom of Kamrupa, through upper Burma, reaching Yunnan; a third route is the well-known Silk Route reaching northwest China, which was the main route through which Buddhism spread into China. Archeological remains of Hindu temples and typical Hindu icons have been found in coastal cities of China and in Dali, Yunnan. It is recorded that in 758 there were three Hindu temples in Guangzhou, with resident Hindus, and Hindu temples in Quanzhou. Remains of Hindu temples have also been discovered in Xinjiang, and they are of an earlier date than those in southeast China.

Hindu texts were translated into Chinese, including a large number of Indian Tantric texts and the Vedas, which are known in Chinese as the Minglun or Zhilun, or through phonetic transliteration as the Weituo, Feituo or Pituo. Various Chinese Buddhist monks dedicated themselves to the study of Hindu scriptures, thought and practice. In the Sui (581–618) and later Tang dynasty (618–907), Hindu texts translated into Chinese included the Śulvasūtra, the Śulvaśāstra and the Prescriptions of Brahmin Rishis. The Tibetans contributed with the translation into Chinese of the Pāṇinisūtra and the Rāmāyaṇa.

In the 7th century there was an intellectual exchange between Taoists and Shaktas in India, with the translation of the Daodejing in Sanskrit. Some breathing techniques practised in Shaktism are known as Cīnācāra ("Chinese Practice"), and the Shakta tantras that discuss them trace their origin to Taoism. Two of these tantras report that the Shakta master Vaśiṣṭha paid visit to China specifically with the purpose of learning Cīnācāra from the Taoists. According to the Tamil text Śaivāgama of Pashupata Shaivism, two of the eighteen siddha of southern Shaktism, Bogar and Pulipani, were ethnically Chinese. Shaktism itself was practised in China in the Tang period.

The effect of Hinduism in China is also evident in various gods, originally of Hindu origin, which have been absorbed into the Chinese folk religion. A glaring example is the god Hanuman, who gave rise to the Chinese god Hóuwáng (猴王 "Monkey King"), known as Sun Wukong in the Journey to the West. In the last decades there has been a growth of modern, transnational forms of Hinduism in China: Yogic ("Yoga" is rendered as 瑜伽 Yújiā, literally the "Jade Maiden"), Tantric, and Krishnaite groups (the Bhagavad Gita has been recently translated and published in China) have appeared in many urban centres including Beijing, Shanghai, Chengdu, Shenzhen, Wuhan and Harbin.

=== Sikhism ===
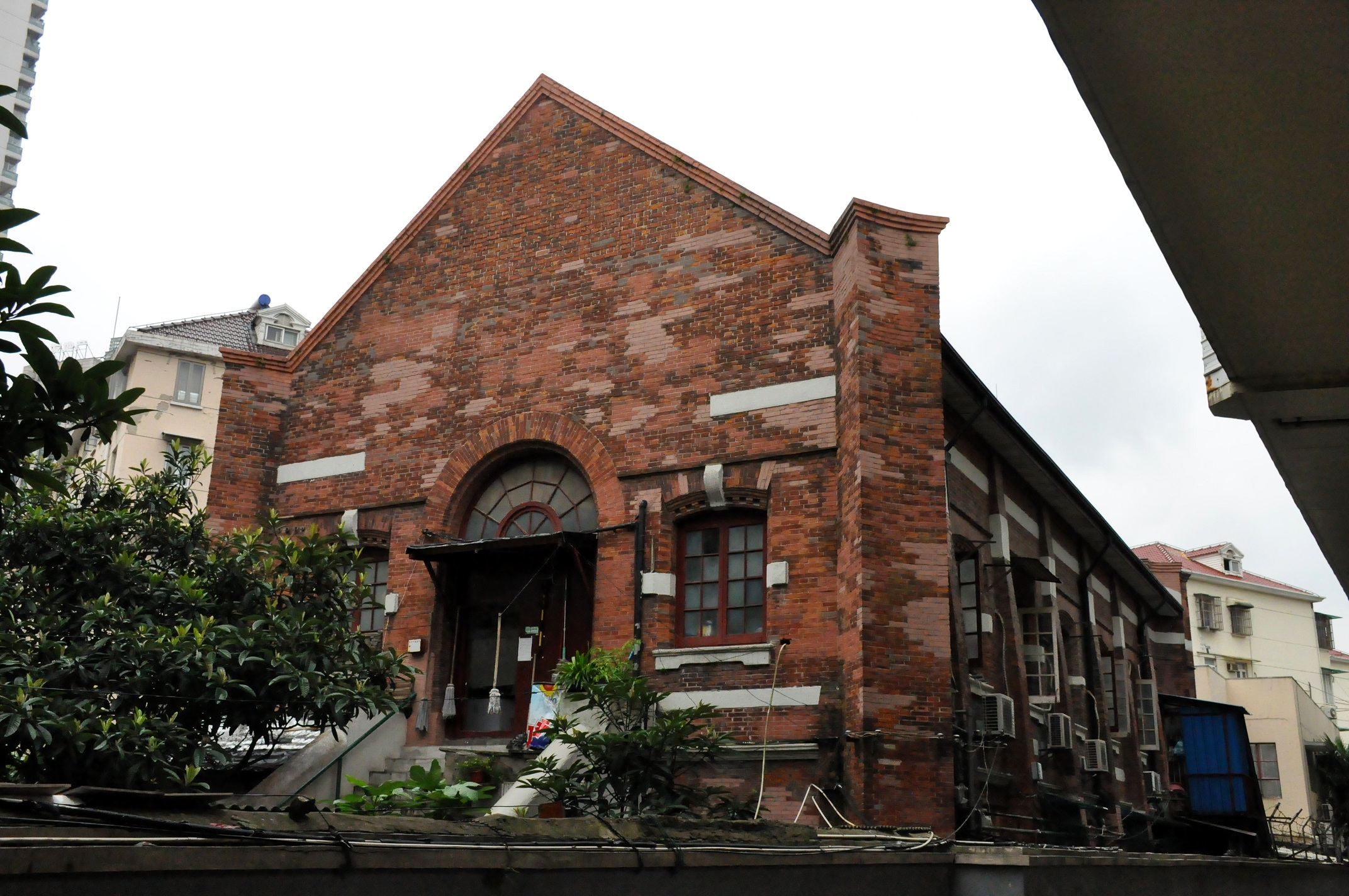
Yindu Xikejiaotang, Shanghai

Sikhism in China is a minority religion in the People's Republic of China (). Sikhism originated from the Punjab region of the northern Indian subcontinent. While it is purported that Guru Nanak travelled to Tibet and the writings of Guru Gobind Singh reference China, a substantial Sikh population in much of China took hold during the British colonial period. Sikhs came to China for work under the colonial framework or used it as a stepping-stone for further migration to other regions of the world. After the establishment of the People's Republic of China, the Sikh population declined. Today, Sikhs form a small minority in China.

== Other religions ==
=== Manichaeism ===
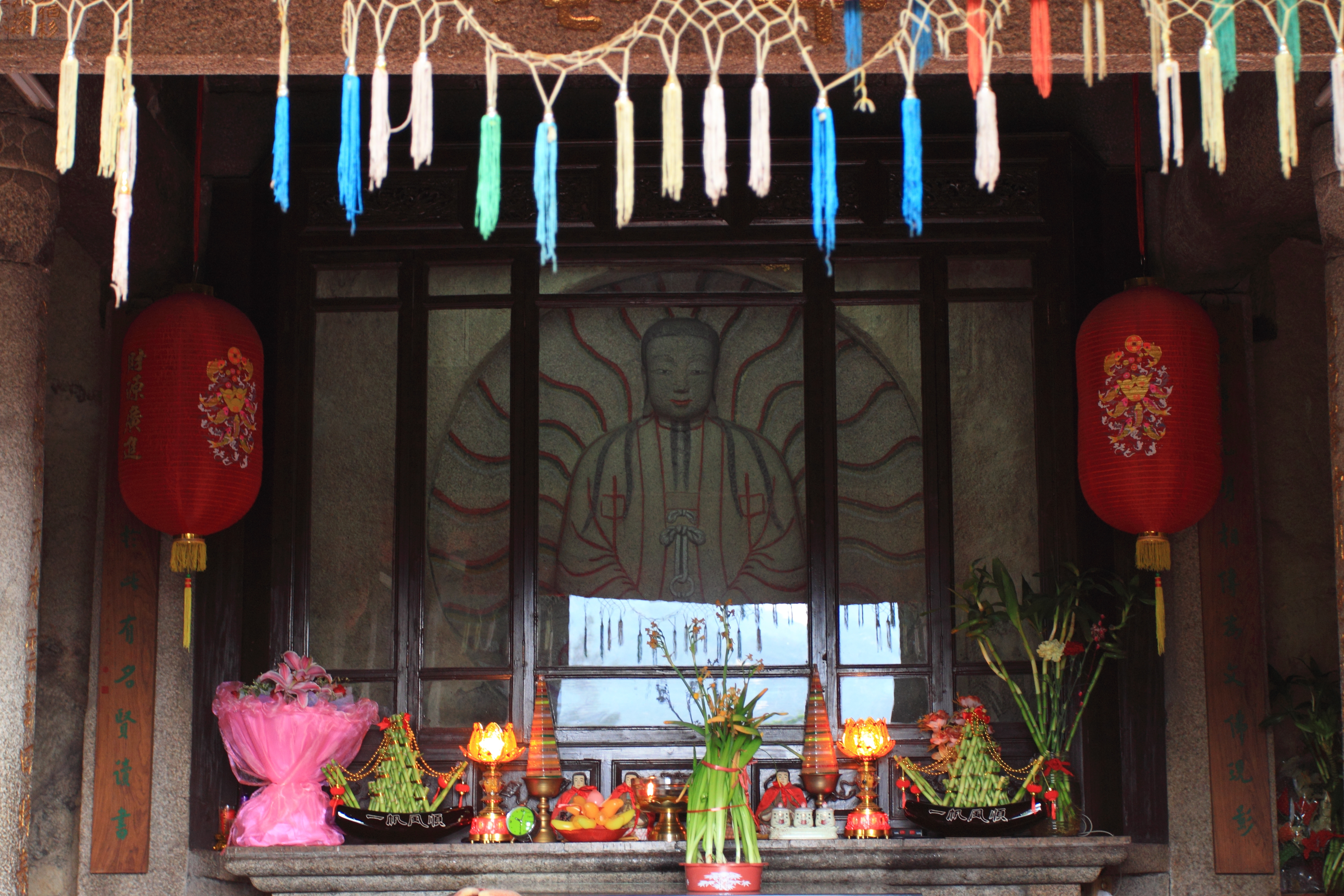
The Awakened One of Light (Mani) carved from the living rock at Cao'an, in Jinjiang, Fujian.

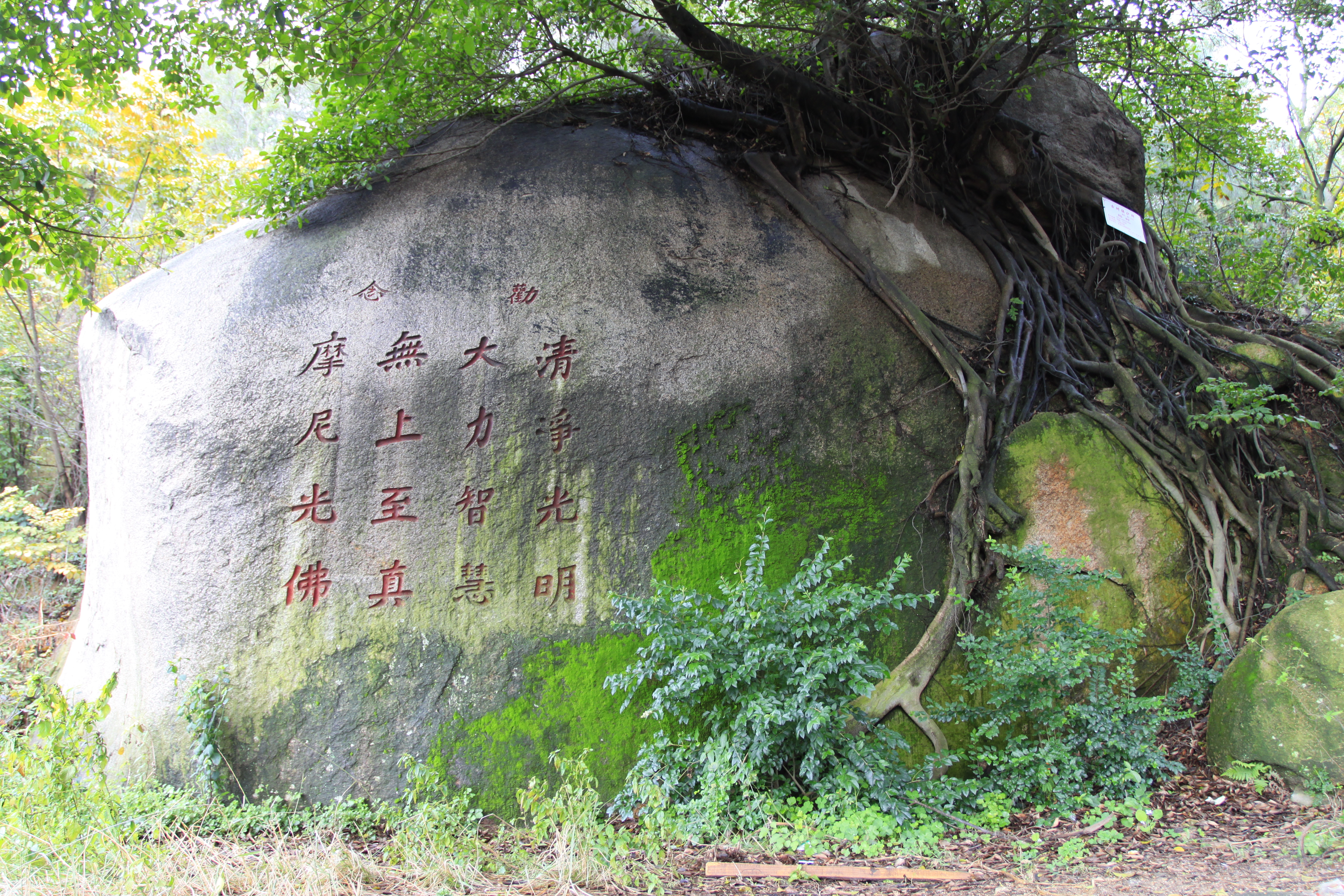
A Manichaean inscription, dated 1445, at Cao'an (modern replica).

Manichaeism (摩尼教 Móníjiào or 明教 Míngjiào, "bright transmission") was introduced in China together with Christianity in the 7th century, by land from Central Asia and by sea through south-eastern ports. Based on Gnostic teachings and able to adapt to different cultural contexts, the Manichaean religion spread rapidly both westward to the Roman Empire and eastward to China. Historical sources speak of the religion being introduced in China in 694, though this may have happened much earlier. Manichaeans in China at the time held that their religion was first brought to China by Mōzak under Emperor Gaozong of Tang (650–83). Later, the Manichaean bishop Mihr-Ohrmazd, who was Mōzak's pupil, also came to China, where he was granted an audience by empress Wu Zetian (684–704), and according to later Buddhist sources he presented at the throne the Erzongjing ("Text of the Two Principles") that became the most popular Manichaean scripture in China.

Manichaeism had a bad reputation among Tang dynasty authorities, who regarded it as an erroneous form of Buddhism. However, as a religion of the Western peoples (Bactrians, Sogdians) it was not outlawed, provided that it remained confined to them not spreading among Chinese. In 731 a Manichaean priest was asked by the current Chinese emperor to make a summary of Manichaean religious doctrines, so that he wrote the Compendium of the Teachings of Mani, the Awakened One of Light, rediscovered at Dunhuang by Aurel Stein (1862–1943); in this text Mani is interpreted as an incarnation of Laozi. As time went on, Manichaeism conflicted with Buddhism but appears to have had good relations with the Taoists; an 8th-century version of the Huahujing, a Taoist work polemical towards Buddhism, holds the same view of the Manichaean Compendium, presenting Mani as Laozi's reincarnation among the Western barbarians.

In the early 8th century, Manichaeism became the official religion of the Uyghur Khaganate. As Uyghurs were traditional allies of the Chinese, also supporting the Tang during the An Lushan Rebellion at the half of the century, the Tangs' attitude towards the religion relaxed and under the Uyghur Khaganate's patronage Manichaean churches prospered in Nanjing, Yangzhou, Jingzhou, Shaoxing and other places. When the Uyghur Khaganate was defeated by the Kyrgyz in 840, Manichaeism's fortune vanished as anti-foreign sentiment arose among the Chinese. Manichaean properties were confiscated, the temples were destroyed, the scriptures were burnt and the clergy was laicised, or killed, as was the case of seventy nuns who were executed at the Tang capital Chang'an. In the same years all foreign religions were suppressed under Emperor Wuzong of Tang (840–846).

The religion never recovered from the persecutions, but it has persisted as a distinct syncretic, and underground movement at particularly in southeastern China. Manichaean sects historically have been known for resurfacing from their hiding from time to time, supporting peasant rebellions. The Song dynasty (960–1279) continued to suppress Manichaeism as a subversive cult. In 1120, a rebellion led by Fang La was believed to have been caused by Manichaeans, and widespread crackdown of unauthorised religious assemblies took place. During the subsequent Mongol Yuan dynasty (1271–1368), foreign religions were generally granted freedom, but the following Ming dynasty (1368–1644) renewed discriminations against them. Despite this, small Manichaean communities are still active in modern China. Manichaeism is thought to have exerted a strong influence on some of the currents of popular sects, such as that which gave rise to Xiantiandao.

=== Zoroastrianism ===
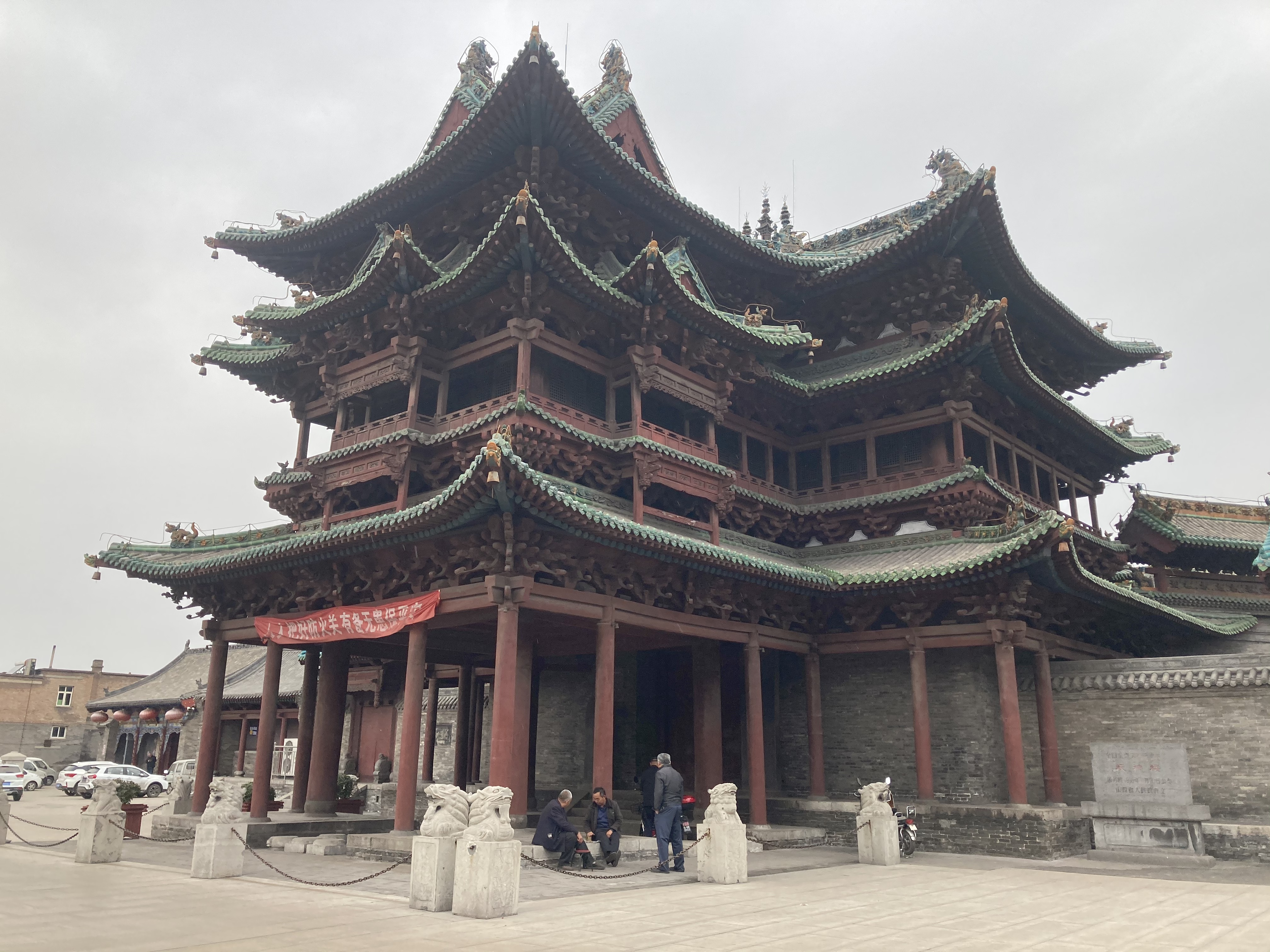
Xianshenlou (祆神楼 in Jiexiu, Shanxi, considered the sole surviving building with Zoroastrian origins in China

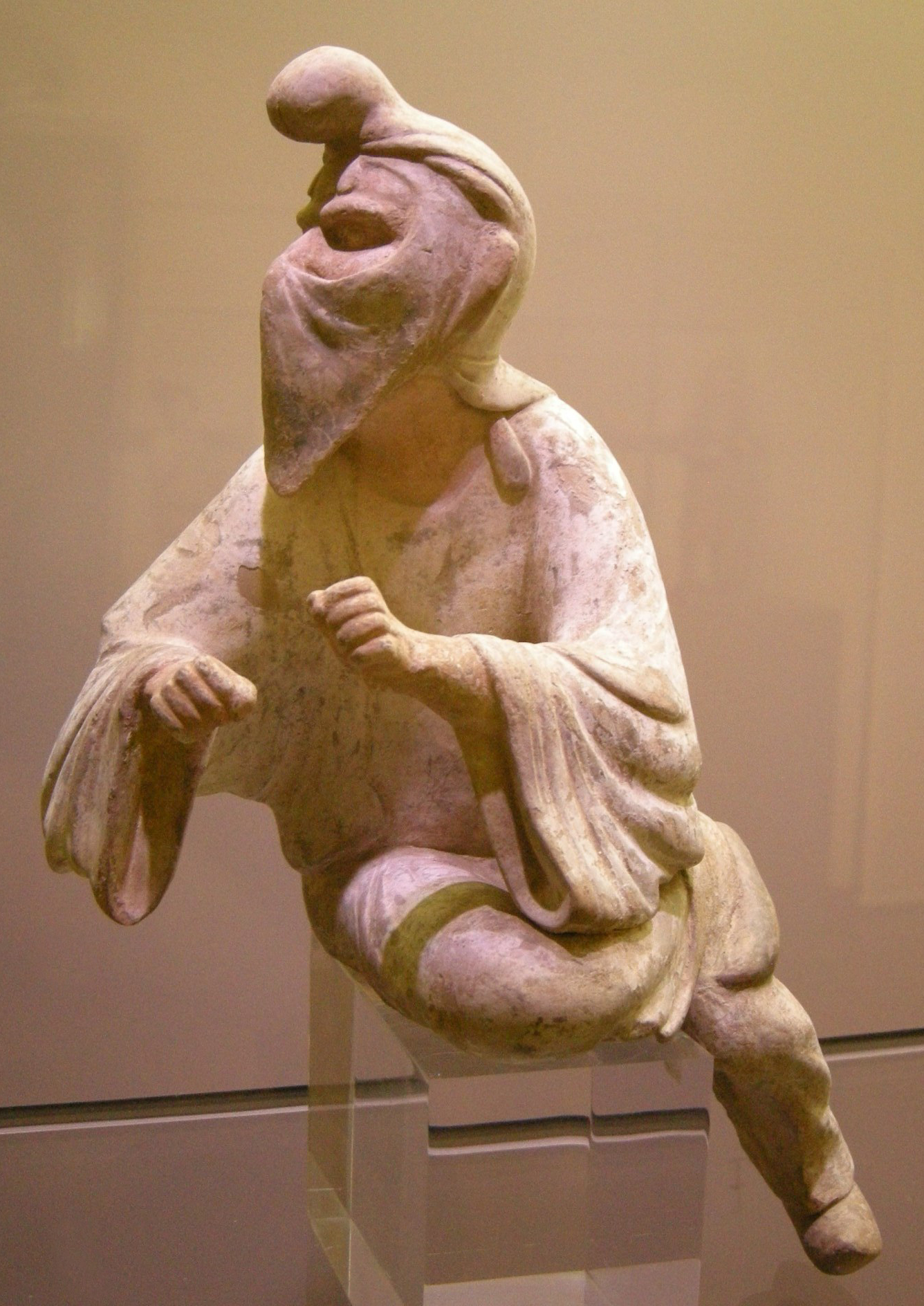
An 8th-century Tang dynasty clay figurine of who was possibly a Sogdian Zoroastrian priest. (Note: The man (with the physical features of an Indo-European) wearing a distinctive cap and face veil, is possibly a camel rider or even a Zoroastrian priest engaging in a ritual at a fire temple, since face veils were used to avoid contaminating the holy fire with breath or saliva. The statue is preserved at the Turin's Museum of Oriental Art, Italy.)

Zoroastrianism (琐罗亚斯德教 Suǒluōyàsīdéjiào or 祆教 Xiānjiào, "Heaven worship teaching"; also named 波斯教 Bōsījiào, "Persian teaching"; also 拜火教 Bàihuǒjiào, "fire-worshippers' transmission"; also 白頭教 Báitóujiào, "old age teaching") was first introduced in northern China in the 4th century, or even earlier, by the Sogdians, and it developed through three stages. Some scholars provide evidences that would attest the existence of Zoroastrianism, or broader Iranian religion, in China, as early as the 2nd and 1st century BCE. Worship of Mithra was indeed performed at the court of Emperor Wu of Han (157–87 BCE).

The first phase of Zoroastrianism in China started in the Wei and Jin dynasties of the Northern and Southern dynasties' period (220–589), when Sogdian Zoroastrians advanced into China. They did not proselytise among Chinese, and from this period there are only two known fragments of Zoroastrian literature, both in Sogdian language. One of them is a translation of the Ashem Vohu recovered by Aurel Stein in Dunhuang and now preserved at the British Museum. The Tang dynasty (618–907) prohibited Chinese people to profess Zoroastrianism, so it remained primarily a religion of foreign residents. Before the An Lushan Rebellion (756–763), Sogdians and Chinese lived as segregated ethnic groups; however, after the rebellion intermarriage became common and the Sogdians were gradually assimilated by the Chinese.

In addition to the Sogdian Zoroastrians, after the fall of the Sasanid dynasty (651), through the 7th and 8th centuries Iranian Zoroastrians, including aristocrats and magi, migrated to northern China. Fleeing the Islamisation of Iran, they settled in the cities of Chang'an, Luoyang, Kaifeng, Yangzhou, Taiyuan and elsewhere. In the Tang period it is attested that there were at least twenty-nine Zoroastrian fire temples in northern urban centres. During the great purge of foreign religions under Emperor Wuzong of Tang also Zoroastrianism was target of suppression.

The second phase of Zoroastrianism in China was in the Five Dynasties and Ten Kingdoms period (907–960), and saw the development of an indigenous Chinese Zoroastrianism that lasted until modern times. During this period, the gods of Sogdian Zoroastrianism were assimilated into the Chinese folk religion; Zoroastrian currents of the Chinese folk religion were increasingly practised by the Chinese and survived until the 1940s. Chinese Zoroastrian temples were witnessed to be active in Hanyang, Hubei until those years.

The third phase started in the 18th century when Parsi merchants sailed from Mumbai to Macau, Hong Kong and Guangzhou. Parsi cemeteries and fire temples were built in these coastal cities, in east China. The Parsis were expelled when the CCP rose to power in 1949. A Parsi fire temple was built in Shanghai in 1866, and was destroyed during the Cultural Revolution. Starting in the 1980s there has been a new wave of Parsis settling in China.

In Classical Chinese, Zoroastrianism was first referred to as 胡天 Hútiān, which in the Wei-Jin period became the appellation of all northern nomads. In the early Tang, a new character was invented specifically for Zoroastrianism, 祆 xiān, meaning the "worship of Heaven". Curiously, in the Far East the Zoroastrians were regarded as "Heaven worshippers" rather than "fire worshippers" (in Japanese the name of the religion is Kenkyō, the same as in Chinese). At the time it was rare for the Chinese to create a character for a foreign religion, and this is an evidence of the effect of Zoroastrians in Tang Chinese society.

=== Japanese Shinto ===
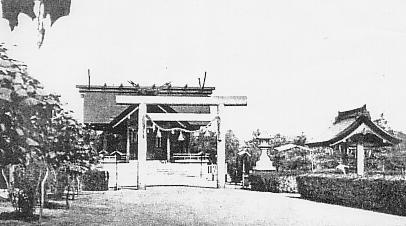
Shinto shrine of Jilin city, Jilin province.

Between 1931 and 1945, with the establishment of the Japanese-controlled Manchukuo ("Manchu Country") in northeast China (Manchuria), many shrines of State Shinto (神社, Chinese: shénshè, Japanese: jinja) were established in the area.

They were part of the project of cultural assimilation of Manchuria into Japan, or Japanisation, the same policy that was being applied to Taiwan. With the end of the Second World War and of the Manchu Country (Manchukuo) in 1945, and the return of Manchuria to China under the Kuomintang, Shinto was abolished and the shrines were destroyed.

During Japanese rule also many Japanese new religions, or independent Shinto sects, proselytised in Manchuria establishing hundreds of congregations. Most of the missions belonged to the Omoto teaching, the Tenri teaching and the Konko teaching of Shinto.

=== New religious movements ===
New religious movements (also termed syncretic sects) synthesize elements from established religious traditions to their particular beliefs and practices, often focused on millenarian ideas. During the late imperial era, new religious movements were significant aspects of China's religious environment.

== Irreligion and antireligious persecution ==
Christianity was the religion most systemically discriminated against in China prior to the founding of the People's Republic of China. Chinese emperors were concerned of whether foreign authorities, particularly the Vatican, would gain control over Chinese Christians. Many Chinese people were concerned that Christianity would replace traditional Chinese cultural identity.

Presently, the PRC government officially promotes atheism, and has engaged in antireligious campaigns. Many churches, temples and mosques were destroyed during the Cultural Revolution, which also criminalized the possession of religious texts. Monks were also beaten or killed. As such, China has the most atheists in the world.

China has a history of schools of thought not relying upon conceptions of a metaphysical absolute being or deity. Chinese philosophy generally focuses on issues of human relationships, practical ethics and governance without inquiring over god or any absolute being. Mark Juergensmeyer observes that Confucianism itself is primarily pragmatic and humanist, in it the "thisworldliness" being the priority. Given the differences between Western and Chinese concepts of "religion", Hu Shih stated in the 1920s what has been translated in Western terminology as "China is a country without religion and the Chinese are a people who are not bound by religious superstitions".

The Classic of Poetry contains several catechistic poems in the Decade of Dang questioning the authority or existence of the God of Heaven. Later, philosophers such as Xun Zi, Fan Zhen, Han Fei, Zhang Zai, and Wang Fuzhi also criticised contemporaneous religious practices. During the growth of Buddhism in the Southern and Northern dynasties, Fan Zhen wrote On the Extinction of the Soul (神灭论; Shénmièlùn) to criticize ideas of body-soul dualism, samsara and karma. He wrote that the soul is merely an effect or function of the body, and that there is no soul without the body—after the death and destruction of the body. He considered that cause-and-effect relationships claimed to be evidence of karma were merely the result of coincidence and bias. For this, he was exiled by Emperor Wu of Liang (502–549).

== See also ==
- Religious Sinicization under the general secretaryship of Xi Jinping
- Chinese lists of cults
- Chinese ritual mastery traditions
- Chinese temples
- Three teachings
- Zhizha

=== Other ===
- Chinese folk religion in Southeast Asia
- East Asian religions
- Northeast China folk religion
- Religion in Inner Mongolia
- Religion in Hong Kong
- Religion in Macau
- Religion in Northeast China
- Religion in Taiwan
- Religion in Tibet
