= Religion in Inner Mongolia =

Religion in Inner Mongolia (2000s-2010s)
1. Chinese Buddhism, Chinese and Mongol folk religions (worship of Heaven and aobao) (80.0%)
2. Tibetan Buddhism (12.0%)
3. Ancestor veneration (2.35%)
4. Christianity (2.00%)
5. Islam (1.00%)
6. Undetermined (Note: May comprehend other Eastern religious organisations, and people with no belief (atheists) or religious belonging (agnostics).) (2.64%)

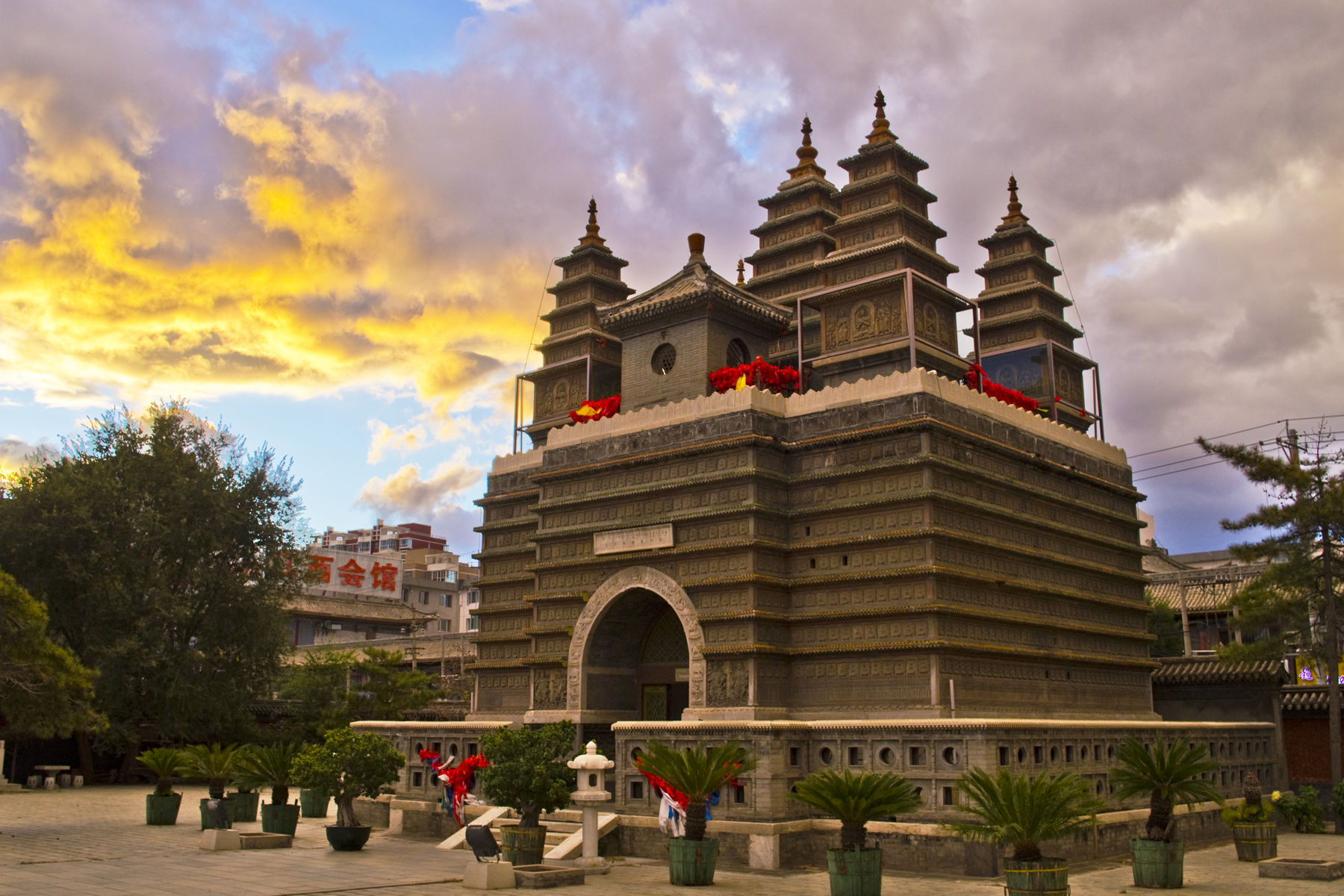
The Temple of the Five Pagodas in Hohhot (built in 1732).

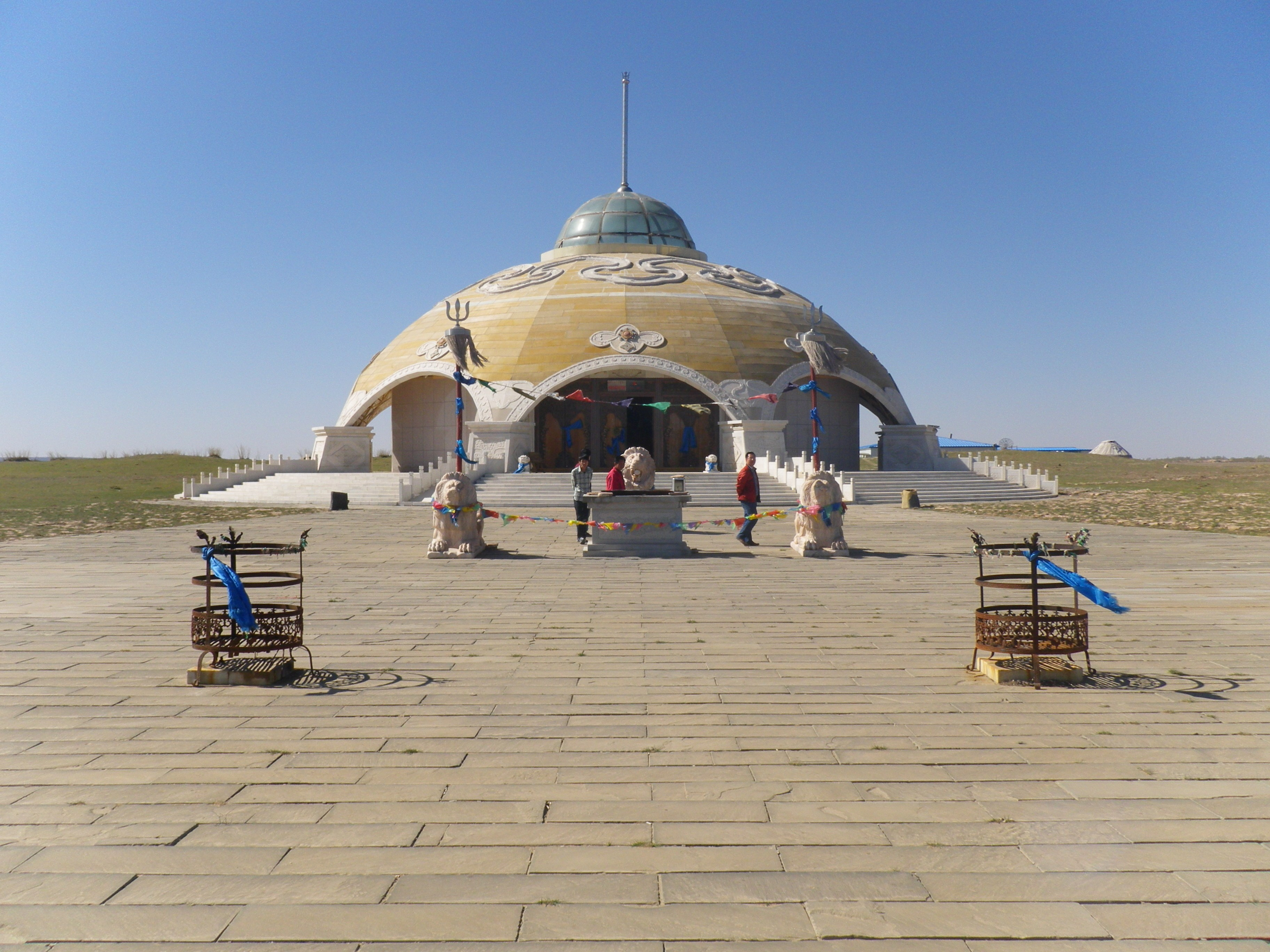
Temple of the White Sulde of Genghis Khan in the town of Uxin in Inner Mongolia, in the Mu Us Desert. The worship of Genghis is shared by Chinese and Mongolian folk religion. (Note: The White Sulde (White Spirit) is one of the two spirits of Genghis Khan (the other being the Black Sulde), represented either as his white or yellow horse or as a fierce warrior riding this horse. In its interior, the temple enshrines a statue of Genghis Khan (at the center) and four of his men on each side (the total making nine, a symbolic number in Mongolian culture), there is an altar where offerings to the godly men are made, and three white suldes made with white horse hair. From the central sulde there are strings which hold tied light blue pieces of cloth with a few white ones. The wall is covered with all the names of the Mongol kins. The Chinese worship Genghis as the ancestral god of the Yuan dynasty.)

Religion in Inner Mongolia is characterised by the diverse traditions of Mongolian-Tibetan Buddhism, Chinese Buddhism, the Chinese traditional religion including the traditional Chinese ancestral religion, Taoism, Confucianism and folk religious sects, and the Mongolian native religion. The region is inhabited by a majority of Han Chinese and a substantial minority of Southern Mongols (the Mongols of China), so that some religions follow ethnic lines.

According to a survey held in 2004 by the Minzu University of China, about 80% of the population of the region practice the worship of Heaven (that is named Tian in the Chinese tradition and Tenger in the Mongolian tradition) and of aobao. Official statistics report that 12.1% of the population (3 million people) are members of Tibetan Buddhist groups. According to the Chinese Spiritual Life Survey of 2007 and the Chinese General Social Survey of 2009, Christianity is the religious identity of 2% of the population of the region and the Chinese ancestral religion (traditional lineage churches) is the professed belonging of 2.36%, while a demographic analysis of the year 2010 reported that Muslims comprise the 0.91%.

Mongolian Buddhism, which is of the same schools of Tibetan Buddhism, was the dominant religion in Inner Mongolia until the 19th century. Its monastic institution was virtually eradicated during the Cultural Revolution, that was particularly tough against the political power of the lamas. Since the 1980s there has been a modest revival, with the reconstruction of some important monasteries and new smaller temples.

At the same time, there has been an unprecedented development of Mongolian shamanism, especially centered on the cult of Genghis Khan and the Heaven, the former being traditionally considered an embodiment of Heaven itself, in special temples (many of which yurt-style), and the cult of aobao as ancestral shrines. The cult of Genghis is also shared by the Han Chinese, claiming his spirit as the founding principle of the Yuan dynasty.

In facts, there has been a significant integration of the Han Chinese of Inner Mongolia into the traditional Mongolian spiritual heritage of the region. Reconstructed Buddhist monasteries and folk temples are massively attended by local Han. Moreover, as elsewhere in China, there has been a growing conscious adoption of the Gelug sect, and other Tibetan-originated Buddhist schools, by the Han Chinese.

== Main religions ==
=== Buddhism ===
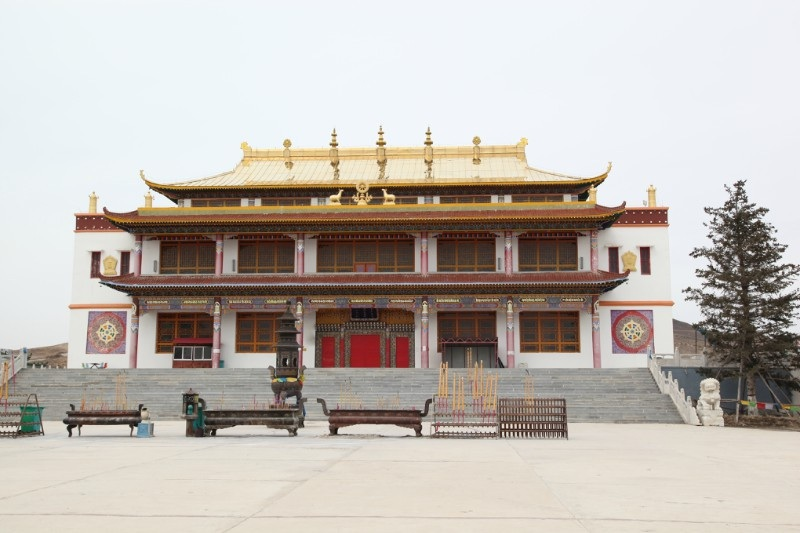
Taulayitu-gegen Yellow Buddhist temple, in the Hinggan League.

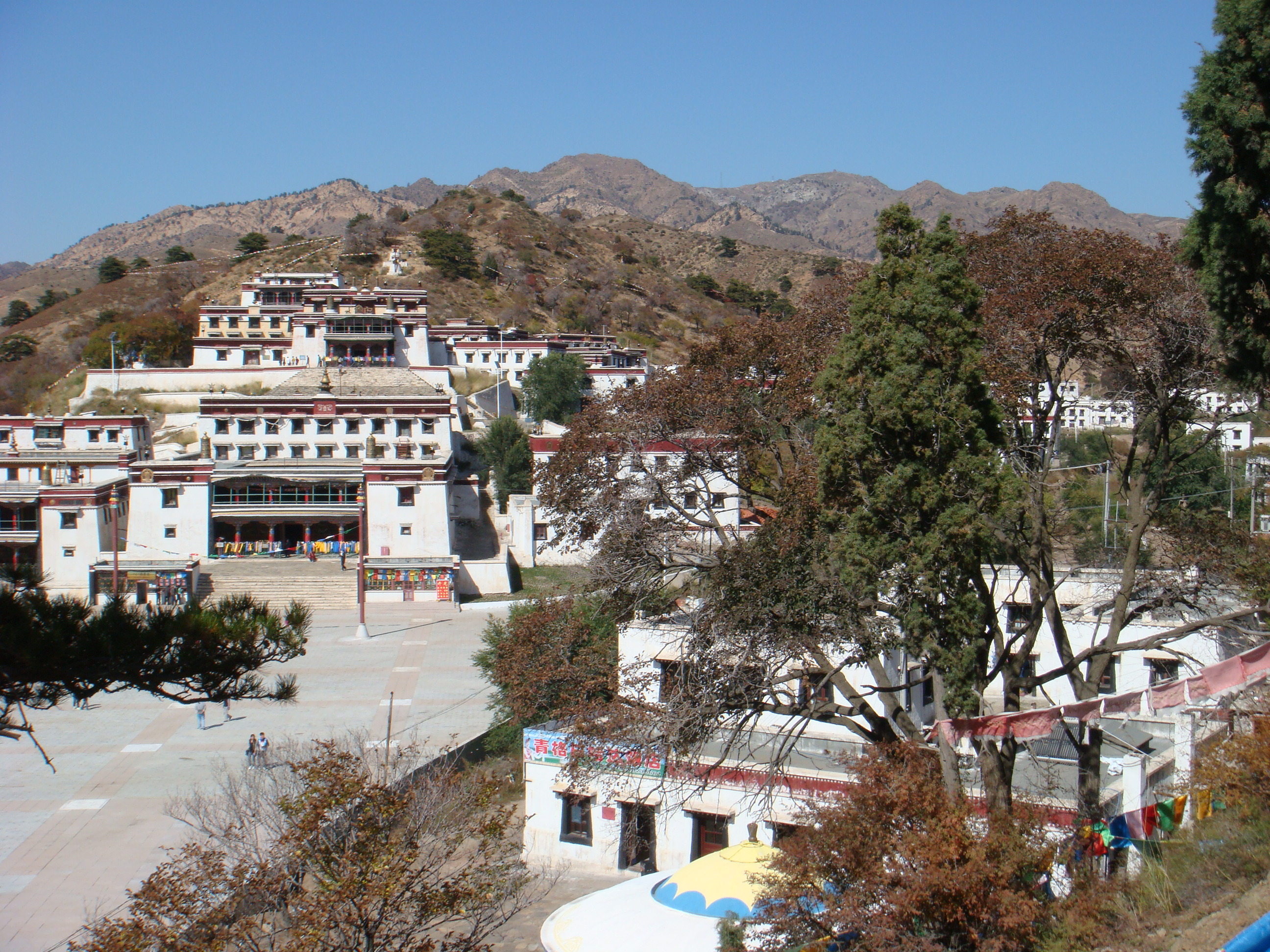
Badekar Monastery (Chinese: 五当召; pinyin: Wǔdāngzhào) of Yellow Buddhism in Shiguai, Baotou.

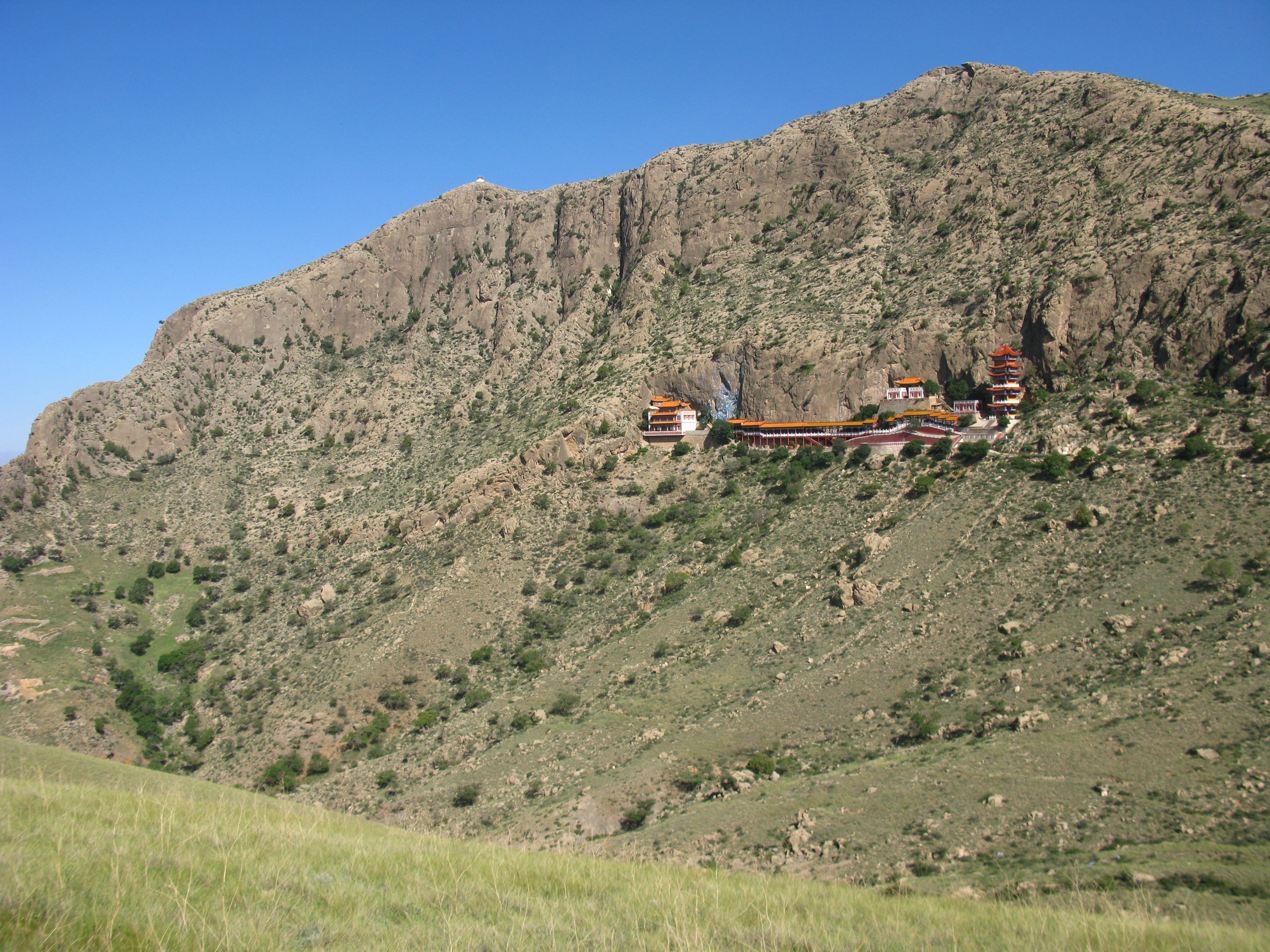
Hanging Temple in Alxa League.

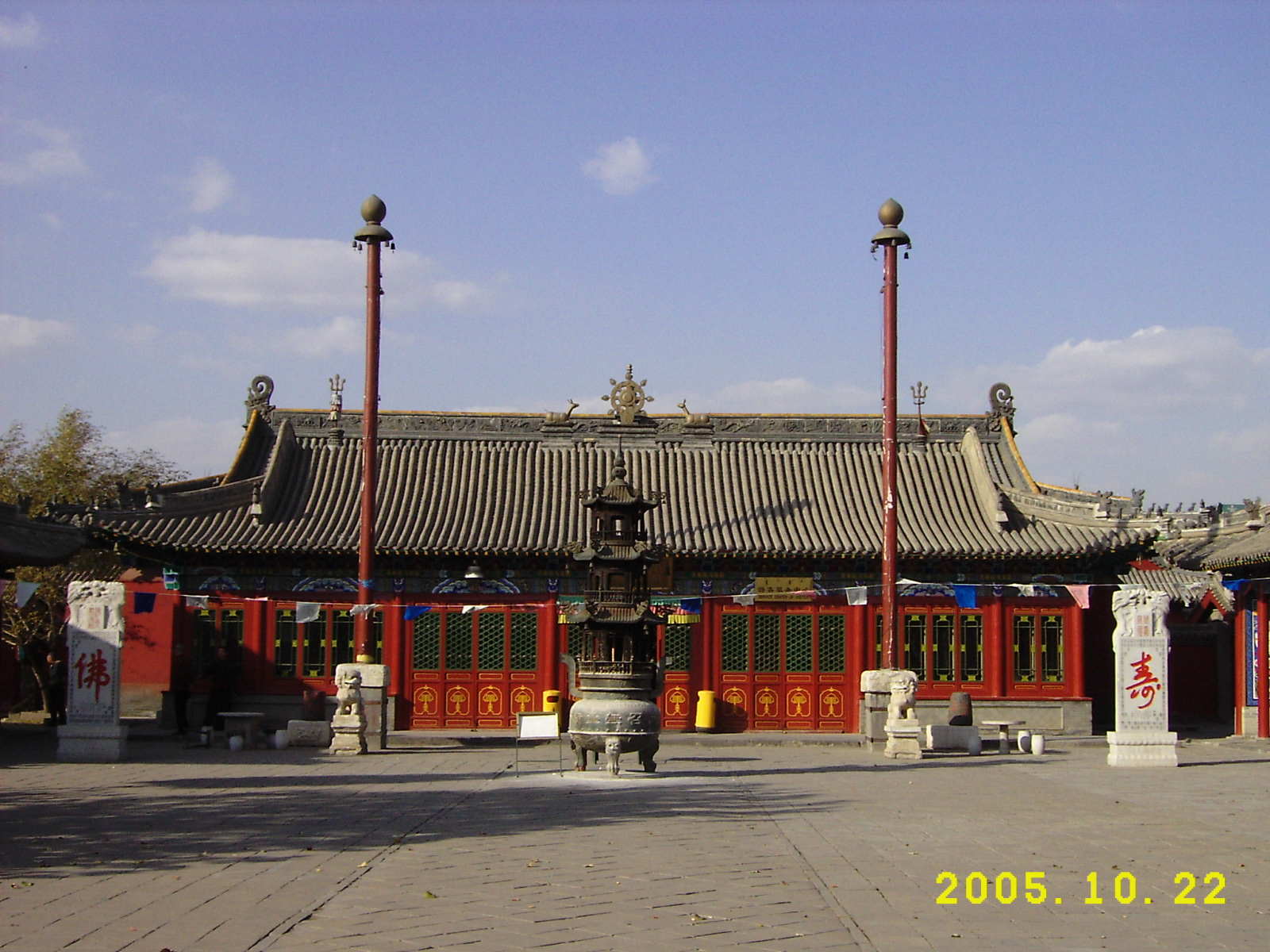
Dazhao Temple (大昭寺 Dàzhāosì) in Hohhot.

Buddhism (which in Mongolian language is named Burkhany Shashin, "Buddha's religion", or Shira-in Shashin, the "Yellow religion" (Note: "Yellow religion" (translated 黄教 Huángjiào in Chinese) is the popular Mongolian name of Buddhism. It is a synecdoche originating from the Gelug sect, also called the sect of the Yellow Hat because its masters wear a yellow hat while performing religious services. However, it may also refer to yellow shamanism, that is a type of Mongolian shamanism which uses a Buddhist-like expressive style.)) was spread to the Mongols during the Yuan dynasty, under the reign of Kublai Khan, when Tibetan lamas of the Sakya sect were active at the court. However, in this period Buddhism didn't penetrate among the general population, and its influence greatly diminished with the fall of the Yuan dynasty.

In the 17th century the Gelug sect became dominant in Mongolian Buddhism. It was during the Manchu Qing dynasty that Buddhism among the Mongols reached its peak. With the state's support, it was in this period that most of the Mongolian Buddhist monasteries and institutes were constructed. Inner Mongolia was the centre of Mongolian Buddhism; in the 19th century, of the approximately 2000 monasteries in Greater Mongolia, 1200 were in Inner Mongolia, and 700 were in Outer Mongolia (corresponding to the contemporary state of Mongolia). By 1900, of the 243 incarnate lamas living in the territories of the Mongols, 157 resided in Inner Mongolia alone. The Qing politics draw the most important of these lamas to the capital at Beijing.

However, with the demise of the Qing and the strong influences of modernisation in Inner Mongolia, including the "Enlightenment Movement" and secular education, in the late 19th century and early 20th century Mongolian Buddhism underwent a decline. The situation became worse during the Cultural Revolution of China, in which religious expression was prohibited. More than ninety percent of the Buddhist monasteries in Inner Mongolia were destroyed in the early years of the revolution.

Many lamas and lay Buddhists continued to practice in secret, until the 1980s when the principle of freedom of religion was instituted in China. A slow revival began, with the reconstruction of some of the old monasteries and the establishment of new smaller temples. The revival of Buddhism has been less powerful among Southern Mongols than that among Outer Mongols (of Mongolia proper) which started in the 1990s, partly because the latter was linked to a self-conscious national-spiritual reawakening.

Identification with Gelug and other Tibetan-originated sects is curbed among Southern Mongols also because of the growing adoption of those schools (and their local monasteries) by the Han Chinese. A phenomenon also present in other parts of China, this influence of Tibetan schools among the Hans has been fueled by the proselytic activity of Chinese-speaking Tibetan lamas.

=== Mongolian shamanism ===
Mongolian shamanism or Tengerism refers to the animistic and shamanic native religion of the Mongols. It is centered on the worship of the tngri (gods) and the highest Tenger (Heaven, God of Heaven, God) or Qormusta Tengri. In the Mongolian native religion, Genghis Khan is considered one of the embodiments, if not the main embodiment, of the Tenger. In worship, communities of lay believers are led by shamans (called böge if males, iduγan if females), who are intermediaries of the divine.

==== Genghis Khan worship ====
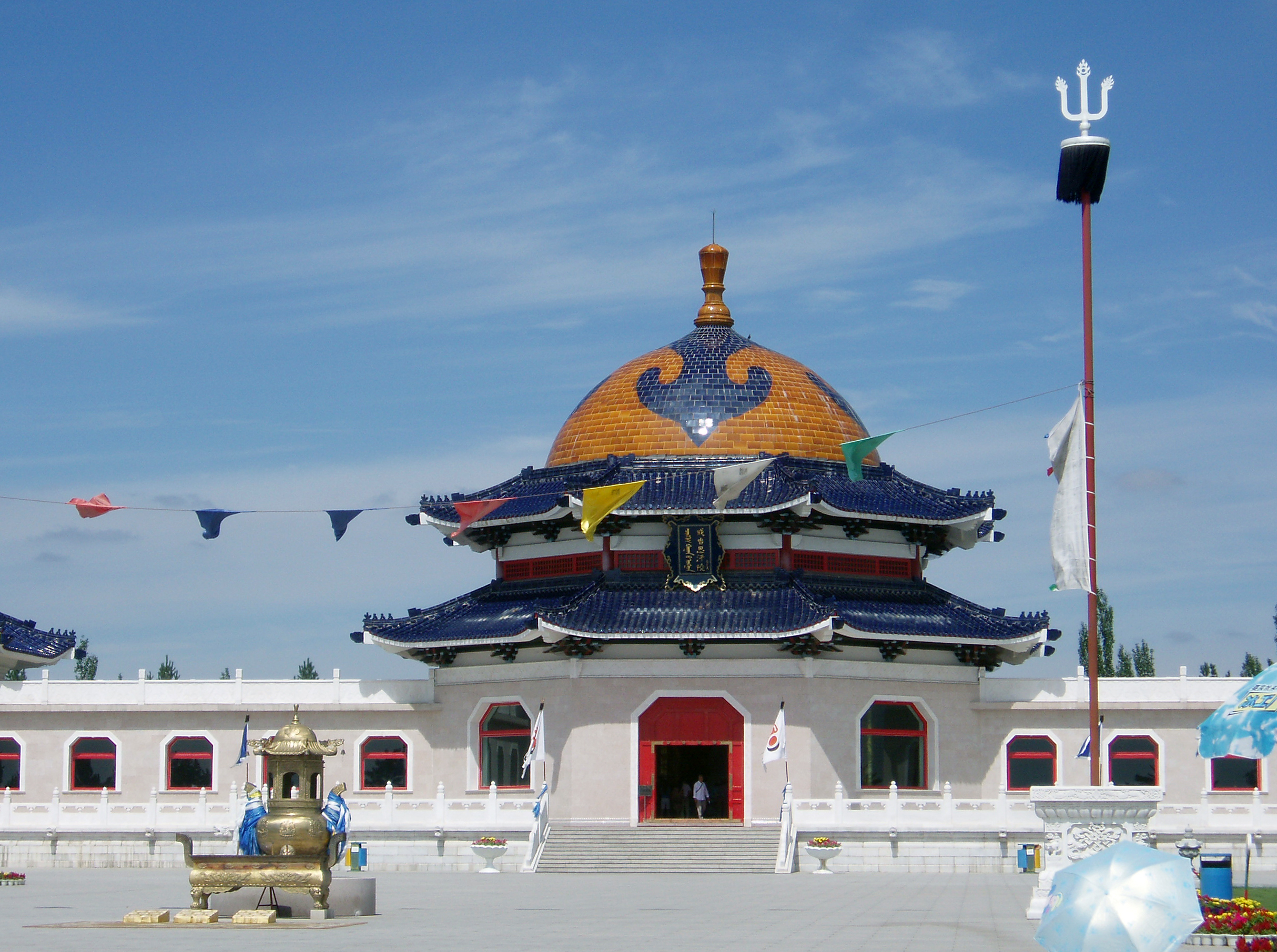
Main hall of the Shrine of the Lord Genghis Khan, in Ordos City.

A cult of Genghis Khan had existed until the 1930s, centered on a shrine which preserved mystical relics of Genghis, that was located in the Ordos Loop of Inner Mongolia. The Japanese, during the occupation of China, tried to take possession of the relics in order to catalyse a pro-Japanese Mongol nationalism, but they failed.

Within the Mongolian People's Republic (1924–92) the Mongolian native religion was suppressed, and Genghis' shrines destroyed. In Inner Mongolia, otherwise, the worship of the cultural hero persisted; the hereditary custodians of the shrines survived there, preserving ancient manuscripts of ritual texts, written partially in an unintelligible language called the "language of the gods".

With the establishment of the People's Republic of China, the Chinese rallied Mongol nationalism to the new state and constructed the Shrine of Genghis Khan (or Shrine of the Lord, as it is named in Mongolian) in Ordos City, where they gathered the old sanctuary tents, confirmed the guardians of the cults in office, and subsidised annual sacrifices.

The shrine in Ordos has since then become the focal point of a revival of Genghis Khan's cult throughout Inner Mongolia. The Han Chinese themselves pay homage to him as the spiritual foundation of the Yuan dynasty. Various other temples of Genghis Khan, or branches of the shrine in Ordos, have been established in Inner Mongolia and northern China.

==== Aobao worship ====
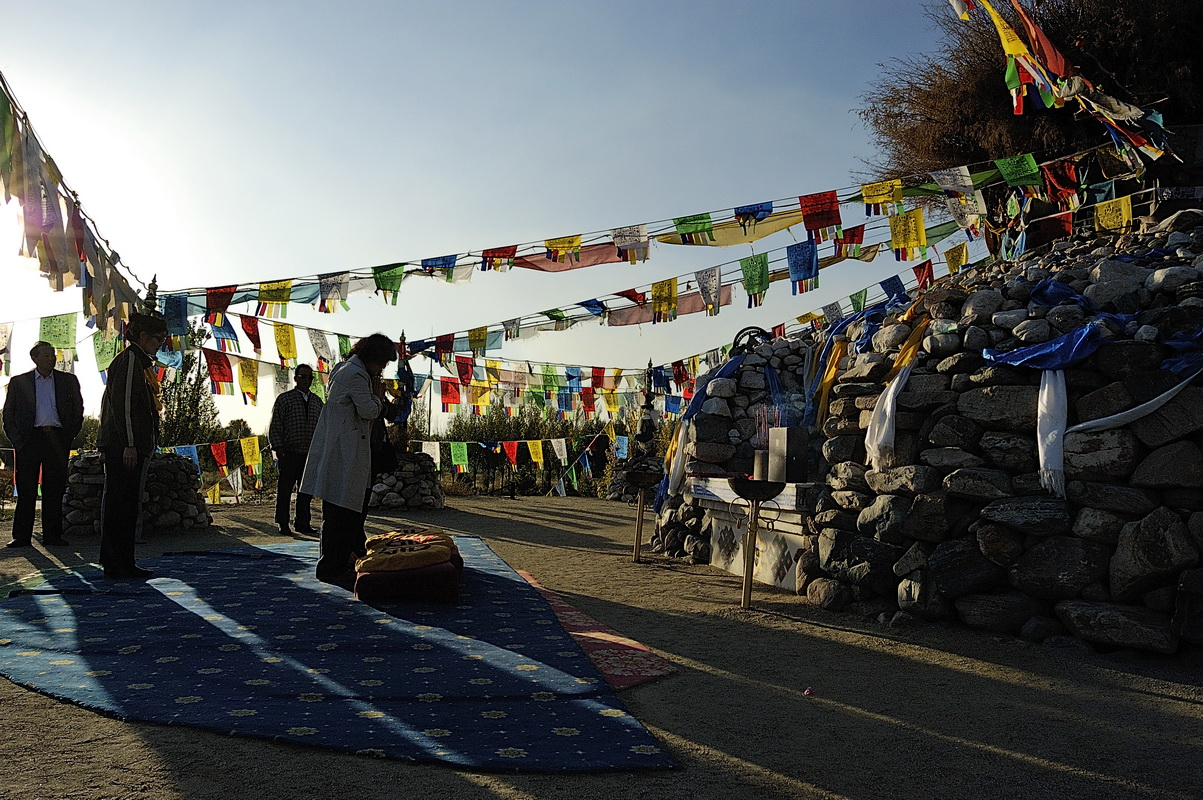
A woman worships at an aobao in Baotou.

Aobaoes (敖包 áobāo, "magnificent bundle [i.e. shrine]") are sacrificial altars of the shape of a mound that are traditionally used for worship in the indigenous religion of Mongols and related ethnic groups. Every aobao is thought as the representation of a god. There are aobaoes dedicated to heavenly gods, mountain gods, other gods of nature, and also to gods of human lineages and agglomerations.

The aobaoes for worship of ancestral gods can be private shrines of an extended family or kin (people sharing the same surname), otherwise they are common to villages (dedicated to the god of a village), banners or leagues. Sacrifices to the aobaoes are made offering slaughtered animals, joss sticks, and libations.

=== Chinese traditional religion ===
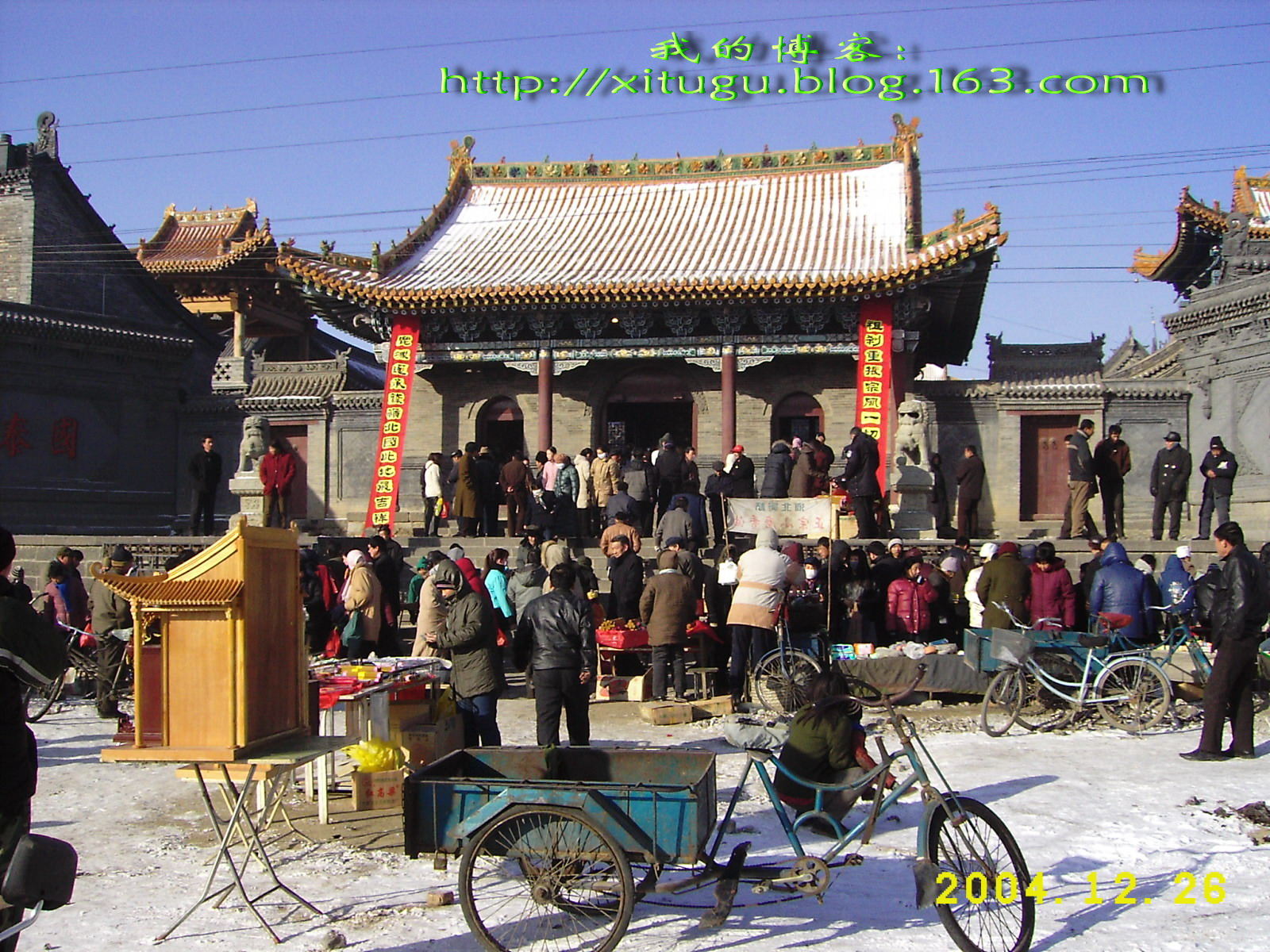
People feast at a temple of Father Lu (吕祖庙 Lǚzǔmiào) in Baotou.

Many Han Chinese throughout the region of Inner Mongolia practice their native religion. It consists in the worship of the shen (神 "expressions", "gods", "spirits"), that is to say, the powers of generation, of nature, interpreted through Chinese culture. On the human sphere, they are ancestors and progenitors of families or lineages, and divine heroes that made a significant imprinting in the history of the Chinese civilisation.

=== Confucianism ===
Confucius, the important philosopher of the Spring and Autumn period, is worshipped throughout northern China, and Inner Mongolia as well, as a culture hero, an embodiment of the god of culture (文帝 Wéndì). Many cities have a temple dedicated to the god of culture as Confucius (文庙 wénmiào), whereas in southern China the god is more often worshipped as Wenchang Wang. Confucianism, the school of thought or religion founded on Confucius' teachings, is mainly a holistic moral code for human relations with emphasis on the importance of tradition and rites.

=== Taoism ===
There are many Han Chinese Taoist communities in Inner Mongolia. The Temple of the Great Clarity (太清宫 Tàiqīnggōng) is an example of Taoist temple in Hohhot.

== Abrahamic religions ==
=== Christianity ===
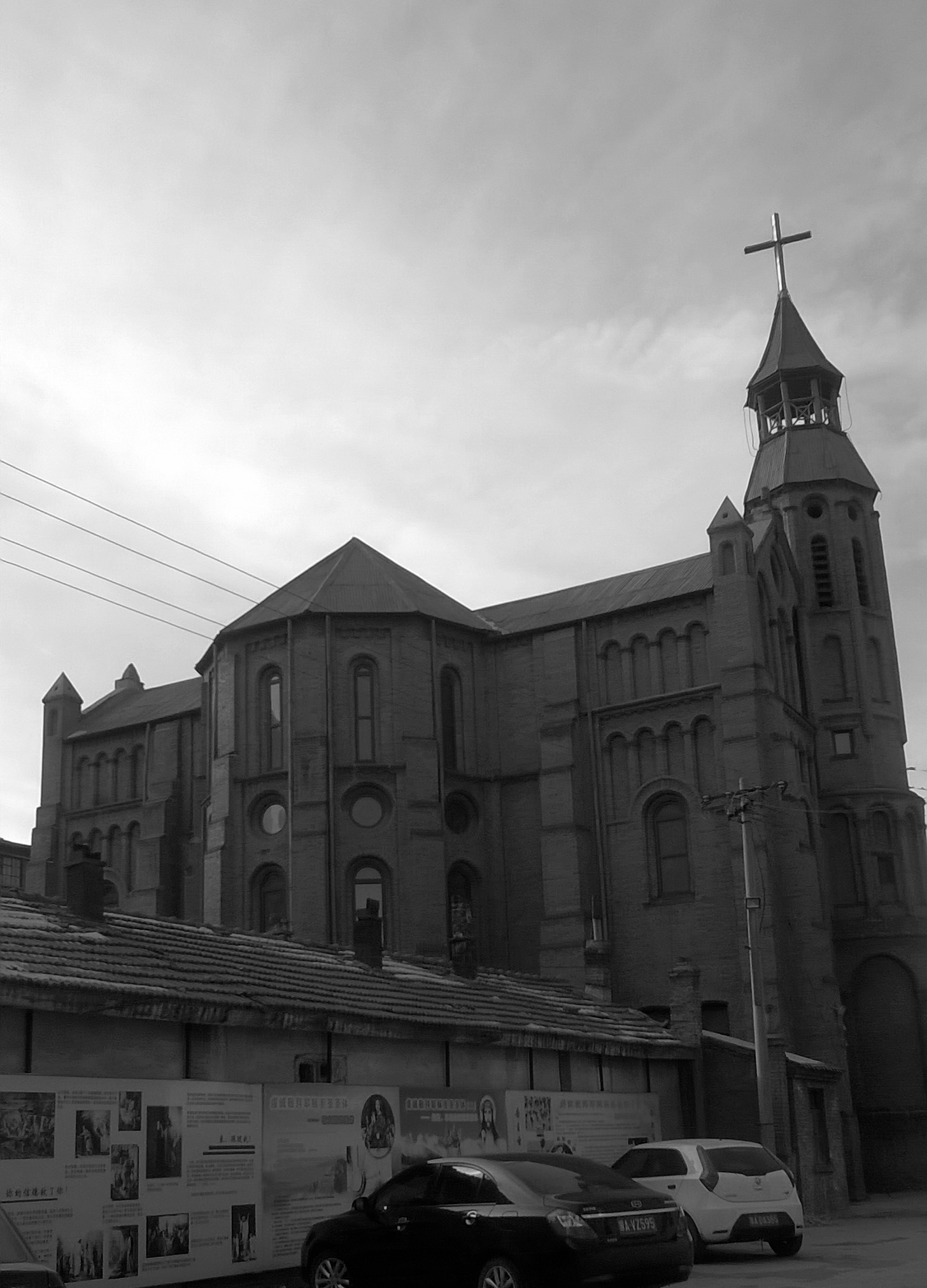
Cathedral of the Sacred Heart of Jesus in Hohhot.

The Church of the East was an important religion among the Mongols at its peak of diffusion, and Inner Mongolia hosts archeological remains of the ancient Christian communities. It was reintroduced in China, after having disappeared among the Han Chinese, by the Mongols themselves, when they invaded the country in the 13th century establishing the Yuan dynasty.

Protestantism was introduced in the 19th century. Ignoring the Qing dynasty policy that prevented them from entering Inner Mongolia and Manchuria, Christian missionaries, along with an ever-increasing number of Han Chinese settlers, entered the region and proselytised there since the last decades of the century.

According to the China General Social Survey of 2009 there are 494,126 Christians in Inner Mongolia, equal to 2% of its total population.

=== Islam ===
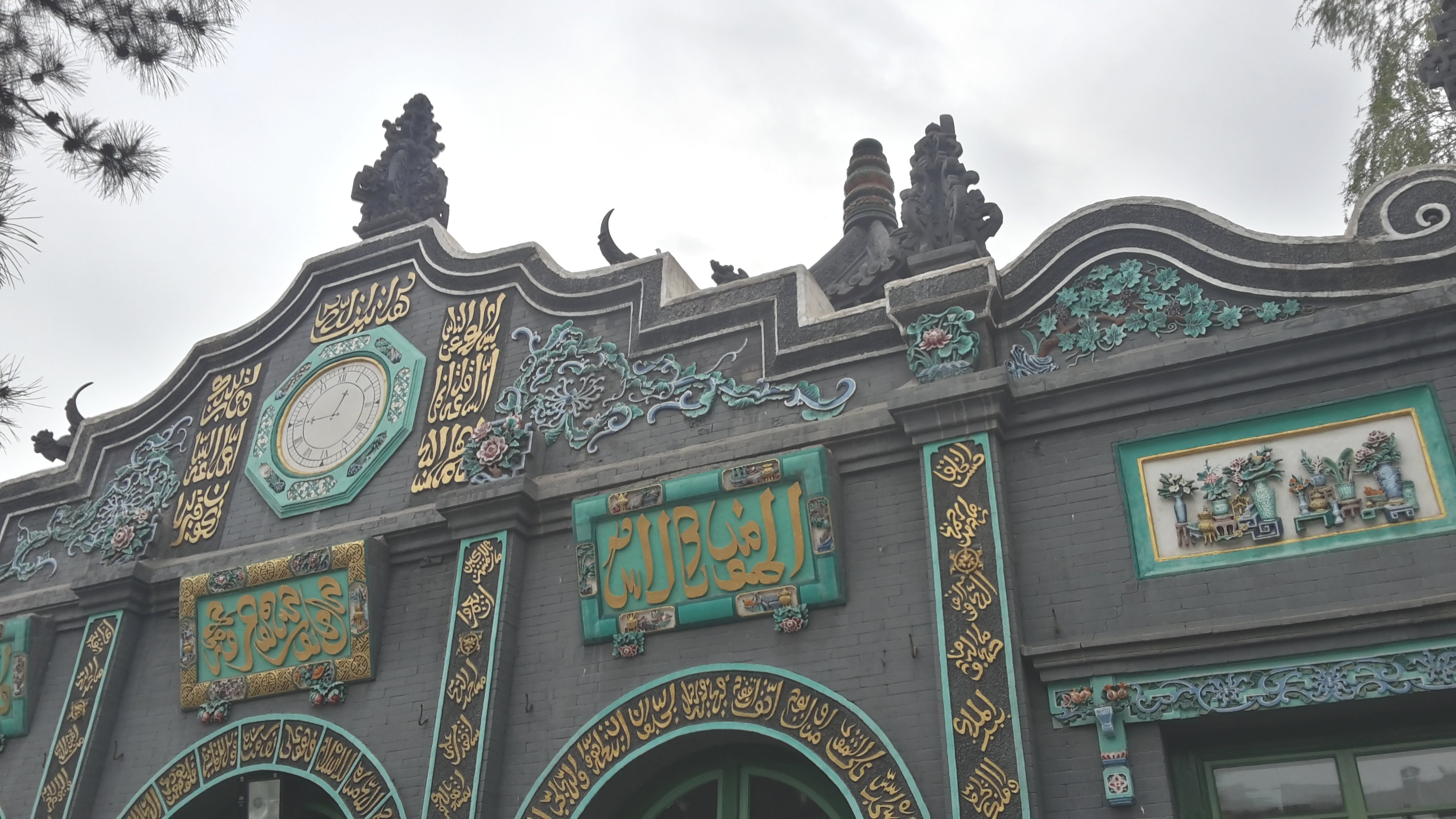
Façade with clock of the main hall of the Great Mosque of Hohhot.

Inner Mongolia has a small population of Hui Chinese who are Muslims. According to a survey of 2010 there are 21,100 Muslims in the region, equal to 0.91% of its population.

== Statistical breakdown ==
Religious group	Population % 2000s–2010s
Chinese Buddhism, Chinese and Mongolian folk religions	80%
Tibetan Buddhism	12.1%
Chinese traditional lineage religion	2.36%
Christianity	2%
Islam	1%
Undetermined	2.64%

== See also ==
- Buddhism in Mongolia
- Mausoleum of Genghis Khan
- Mongolian Shamanism
- Qormusta Tengri
- Religion in China
- Religion in Mongolia

== Sources ==
- Almaz Khan. Chinggis Khan: From Imperial Ancestor to Ethnic Heroe. University of Washington.
- Bawden, C. R. Modern History Mongolia. Routledge, 2013. ASIN B00K1GW48Y
- Isabelle Charleux. Chinggis Khan: Ancestor, Buddha or Shaman?. On: Mongolian Studies: Journal of the Mongolia Society, 31, 2009. pp. 207–258.
- John Man. Genghis Khan. Bantam, 2005. ISBN 0553814982
- John Man. Genghis Khan: Life, Death and Resurrection. Bantam Press, London, 2004. ISBN 9780553814989
- Jonathan Mair. What can social anthropology learn from popular Inner Mongolian Buddhism?. St John's College, Cambridge. Mongolia and Inner Asia Studies Unit, Department of Social Anthropology, Cambridge University, 2008.
- Nicolas Standaert. Handbook of Christianity in China: 635 - 1800. Brill Academic, 2000. ISBN 9004114319
- Tjalling H. F. Halbertsma. Early Christian Remains of Inner Mongolia: Discovery, Reconstruction and Appropriation. Brill, 2008. ISBN 9004167080
- Vesna A. Wallace. Buddhism in Mongolian History, Culture, and Society. Oxford University Press, 2015. ISBN 0199958661
- Vincent Goossaert, David Palmer. The Religious Question in Modern China. University of Chicago Press, 2011. ISBN 0226304167
- Walther Heissig. The Religions of Mongolia. Routledge, 2000. ISBN 0710306857
- Xing Li. Festivals of China's Ethnic Minorities. China Intercontinental Press, 2006. ISBN 7508509994
