= Ongon =

Spirit in the shamanistic belief system of Mongolia

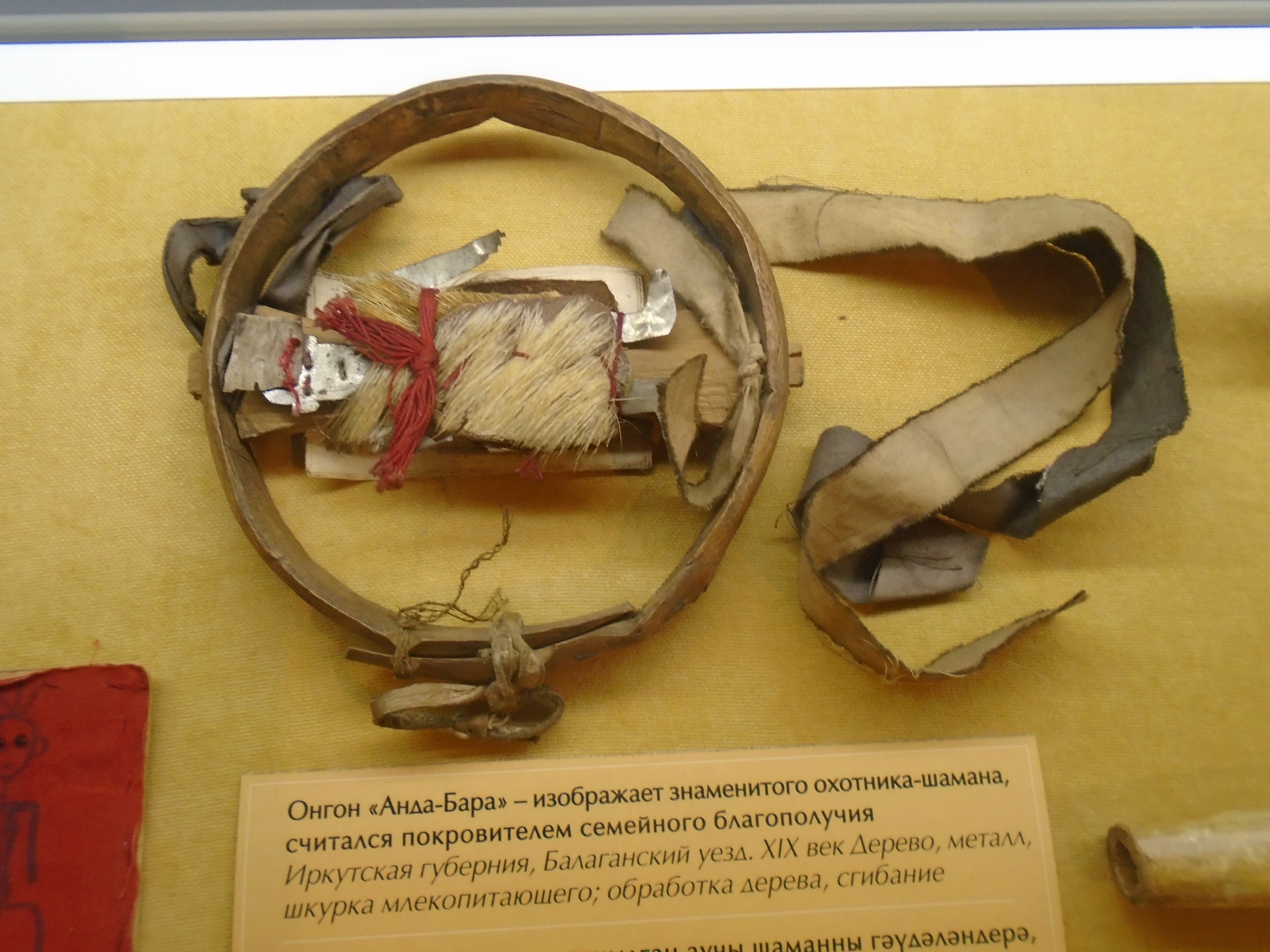
Ongon "Anda-Bara," depicting the famous hunter-shaman, considered the patron of family well-being. Balagansky District, Irkutsk Governorate, 19th century, wood, metal, mammal skin. Exhibition "Nikolai Katanov: The Path to the East," National Museum of the Republic of Tatarstan.

Ongon (Mongolian; plural ongod) is a type of spirit in the shamanistic belief system of Mongolia. It is a common term in Mongol mythology. After death, all shamans become shamanic souls, ongod. Idols can be consecrated to them within three years of the shaman's death and can be placed in the home ("home ongon") or in another locale, such as a shelter out in the open ("field ongon"). The ongon is also the physical representation of that spirit, made by a shaman, which plays a central part in the ritual that invokes the protection of the spirit. One well-known such spirit is Dayan Deerh.

The ongon is particularly important in black shamanism: the main function of the khar talynkh or black shaman is to bring people into contact with the ongon, whose spirit they call up "while drumming in a trance". In late-nineteenth century Mongolia, according to Otgony Purev, yellow shamanism revered ongon as well, and every three years yellow shamans gathered in Dayan Deerh monastery in Khövsgöl Province to "renew" these ancestral spirits.

== Physical representation ==
Ongod are represented in the physical world in various ways. In the case of the Tuvan shamaness Yamaan, an ancestor spirit is represented in the handle of a drum, a carved figure with a pink head and chest, a black crown, and red eyes and forehead. A wire serves as arms, and on another wire holbogo are suspended to indicate the spirit's earring. Some ongon live on in the place inhabited by the shaman: Agaaryn Khairhan, a mountain in Khövsgöl Province, takes its name from one of the most powerful shamanesses of the Darkhad clan, Agaaryn Khairhan or Bagdan Udgan, who lived on the mountain in the eighteenth century. In present-day Northern Mongolia, specifically the Darkhad Valley, clusters of ongod are found in transitional or liminal locations, such as the mouths of rivers or the borders between taiga and steppe: In Darkhad Valley, the taiga and surrounding mountains are the traditional areas dominated by shamanism, where the steppe is dominated by Buddhism.

Many Darkhad households own talismans, "lineage talismans" (yazguur ongod) or "household talismans" (geriin ongod), that both contain and attract spirits.

== Bibliography ==
- Birtalan, Ágnes (2011). "The representation of the Mongolian shaman deity Dayan Deerh in invocations and in a Buddhist scroll painting". Études Mongoles & Sibériennes, Centrasiatiques & Tibétaines. 42 (42). doi:10.4000/emscat.1800.
- Pedersen, Morten Axel (2011). Not Quite Shamans: Spirit Worlds and Political Lives in Northern Mongolia. Cornell UP. ISBN 9780801476204.
- Pegg, Carole (2001). Mongolian Music, Dance, & Oral Narrative: Performing Diverse Identities. U of Washington P. ISBN 9780295981123.
- Shimamura, Ippei (2004). "Yellow Shamans (Mongolia)". In Walter, Mariko Namba; Neumann Fridman, Eva Jane (eds.). Shamanism: An Encyclopedia of World Beliefs, Practices, and Culture. Vol. 1. ABC-CLIO. pp. 649–651. ISBN 9781576076453. Archived from the original on 2014-07-15.
