= Arshi =

Arshi is a name, and may refer to:

== People ==
- Amar Arshi, Punjabi singer
- Mona Arshi, British poet
- Arshi, King Shakuni's wife
- Arshi Khan, Indian model, actress, internet celebrity
- Arshi Pipa (1920–1997), Albanian philosopher, writer, poet and literary critic

== Other ==
- Arshi Tengri, Mongolian god
