= Tenger =

- Tenger, mountain in Mongolia
- the Tengger Desert, a desert in China
- Tengger (singer) (born 1960), a pop singer from Inner Mongolia
- Tngri, a class of spiritual beings in Mongol traditional religion
