= Kalgançı =

Apocalypse in Turkic mythology

Kalgançı means apocalypse in Turkic mythology. It is also called the "Kalgançı Age".

== Definition ==
Kalganan (leaping) day. The day when the world and/or universe will perish and then all the dead will be resurrected. According to this belief, earth life is not permanent; one day it will end and people, animals, and plants will perish. Towards this end, the human race will begin to decline, crimes will increase, sins will walk away, and people's fear of Tengri will disappear. At the end of the great war that will occur between Ülgen, the symbol of goodness, and Erlik, the symbol of evil, all the fighters will die, except for Ülgen. When Ülgen sees that all living things have died and that there is no one left on earth except him, he will shout "Get up, O dead people". This is the kalkancı çağı (perpetual age), which means "the resurrection of men." People will decrease, evil will increase, and Erlik will approach the world. The term Sağış Günü (Day of Reckoning) is also used. This concept, which has not been discussed widely in Turkish culture, has been shaped to a large extent by the belief of Islam, even with the influence of Christianity, and Buddhism. For example, the belief that the sun will rise from the west arose under the influence of Islam. In some dialects it is called Kirti Gün (Real Day) or Uluğ Kün (Great Day).

== End time ==
The word "Ahir Zaman" is of Muslim origin and occurs as almost the same terms in different Turkic peoples. Although the origin of this understanding is Islam, another source is the mythological views of the ancient Turks. In the Book of Dede Korkut, it is said, "When the barn is time and the apocalypse breaks...". According to one of the beliefs, one day the sun and the moon will unite and they will burn the earth. Then all hell will break loose. According to another belief, on the day the sun rises from the west, the waters will swell and cover all sides. After that, the world will be flat.

== Etymology ==
It is derived from the root (kal). It comes from the verb kalgamak. Getting up means leaping. It is related to the word get up. The verb Halgah (Kalkah) in Old Turkic means to be afraid, which in this context can also mean the Day of Fear. Another view is that it means permanence and means Permanent Time.
