= Dayisun Tngri =

Mongolian deity

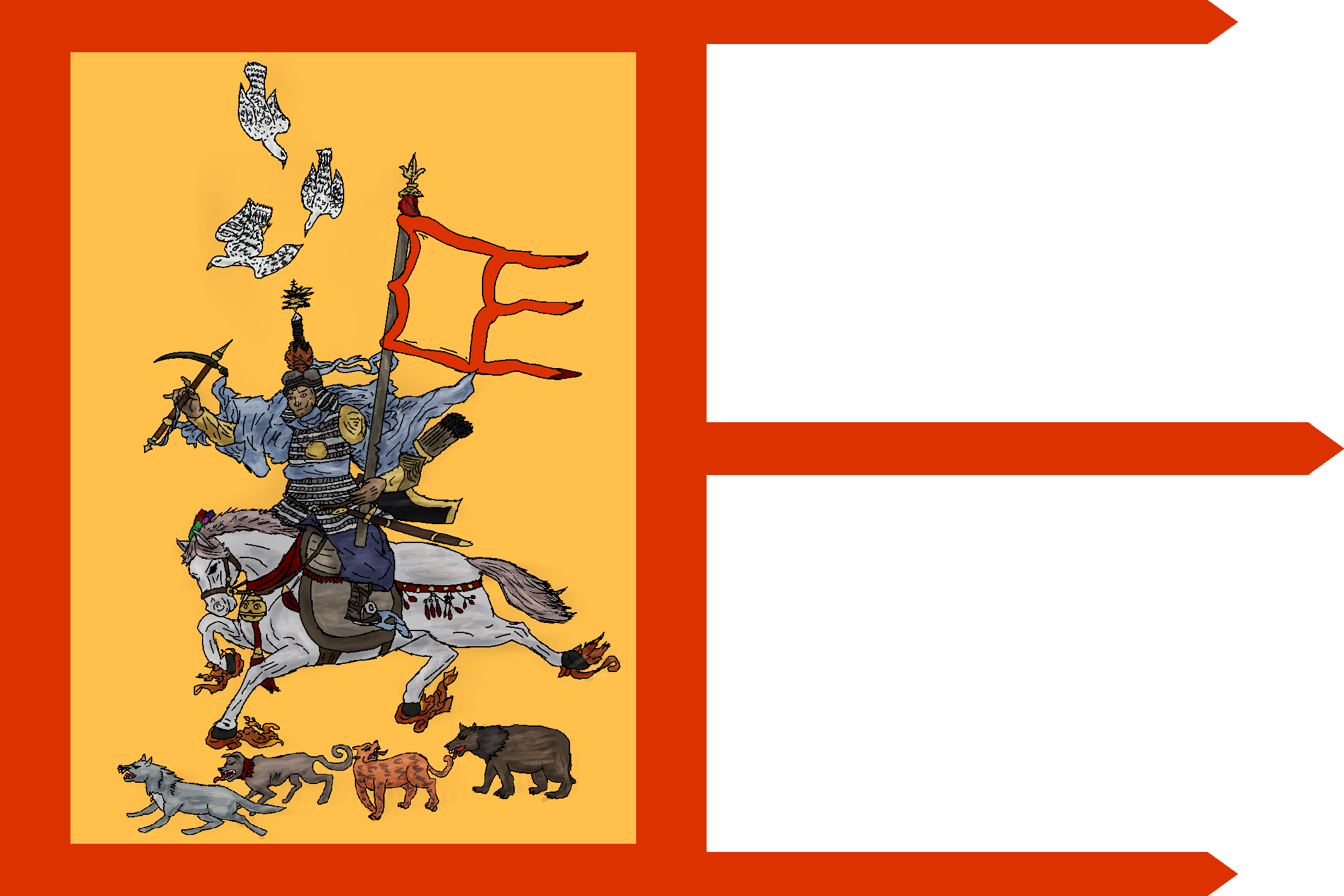
Dayisun Tngri on the Banner of the Dzungar Khanate

Daichsun Tngri, also known as Dayisud Tngri and Dayičin Tngri, is a Mongolian war god "of a protective function" to whom captured enemies were sometimes sacrificed. One of the equestrian deities within the Mongolian pantheon of 99 tngri, Dayisun Tngri may appear as a mounted warrior. Some of his characteristics may be the result of the "syncretistic influence of Lamaism" (Tibetan Buddhism); the 5th Dalai Lama composed invocations to this deity.

== See also ==
- Mongolian shamanism
