= Catalogue of Oriental Manuscripts, Xylographs etc. in Danish Collections =

Catalogue of Oriental Manuscripts, Xylographs etc. in Danish Collections (COMDC), is an international scholarly catalogue describing the manuscripts taken from Asia and North Africa held in the Royal Danish Library, the National Museum of Denmark and a few other Danish collections. It is published in collaboration between the Royal Danish Library and the University of Copenhagen, with financial funding from the Carlsberg Foundation.

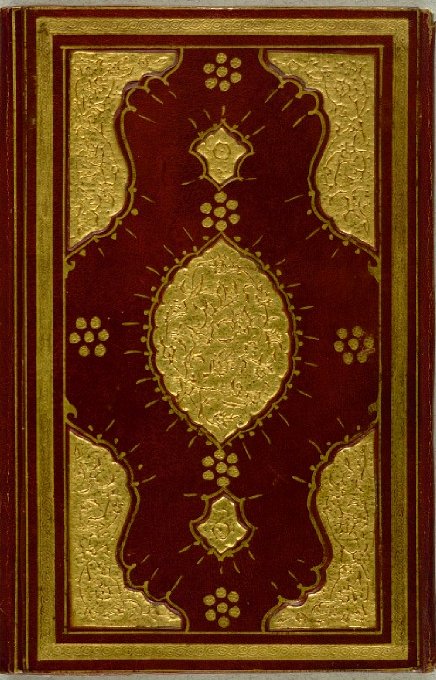
The front of the volume on an Arabic manuscript from 1781/82 (Cod. Arab.Add.53) with a text about the importance of praying to the Prophet followed by examples of prayers to the Prophet. The manuscript is described in COMDC Vol. 5.3 page 1284

The COMDC volumes are published in English and provide detailed bibliographic, codicological, and historical information about individual items, many of which were acquired through missionary, diplomatic, colonial, and scholarly contacts during the 18th and 19th centuries. The early volumes focused on collections of North African, Middle Eastern, South Asian and East Asian manuscripts. Subsequent volumes expanded to include manuscripts held by the Royal Library and other institutions. By 2000, work was underway on Volume 7, covering Arabic manuscripts in the Royal Library.

== History ==
Efforts to catalogue Oriental manuscripts in Danish collections date back to the mid-19th century, when scholars such as Niels Ludvig Westergaard and August Ferdinand Mehren compiled early inventories of non-European texts held by the Royal Library in Copenhagen. Their work culminated in the publication of the Codices Orientales Bibliothecae Regiae Havniensis, a three-volume catalogue published between 1846 and 1857.

In the postwar period, amid increased scholarly interest in manuscript heritage from Asia, the Middle East, and Africa, a renewed cataloguing effort was initiated in collaboration with the Royal Library. In 1952, the Danish philologist Kaare Grønbech helped lay the groundwork for what would later become the Catalogue of Oriental Manuscripts, Xylographs, etc. in Danish Collections (COMDC). This modern series was designed to meet international academic standards, with detailed codicological and historical descriptions, textual analysis, and photographic reproductions.

Since the early 1990s, the series has been edited by Stig T. Rasmussen, then head of the Oriental Department at the Royal Library. The COMDC volumes aim to make Denmark’s holdings of non-European manuscripts accessible to a global research community, while also contributing to broader efforts to clarify the provenance and context of such collections, many of which were acquired during the colonial era.

== Volumes ==
- Codices Orientales Bibliothecae Regiae Havniensis

- Pars 1, Codices Indici, N. L. Westergaard, 1846 Link to digital edition
- Pars 2, Codices Hebraici et Arabici, 1851 Link to digital edition
- Pars 3, Codices Persici, Turcici, Hindustanici variique alii, A. F. Mehren, 1857 Link to digital edition

- Catalogue of Oriental Manuscripts, Xylographs etc in Danish Collections, COMDC

- Vol. 1. Catalogue of Ceylonese Manuscripts / C.E. Godakumbura, 1980. Link to digital edition
- Vol. 2.1. Catalogue of Cambodian and Burmese Pāli manuscripts / C.E. Godakumbura, assisted by U Tin Lwin, 1983. Link to digital edition
- Vol. 2.2. Catalogue des Manuscrits en Pali, Laotien et Siamois provenant de la Thaïlande / Georges Cœdès, 1966. Link to digital edition
- Vol. 3. Catalogue of Mongol Books, Manuscripts and Xylographs / Walther Heissig, assisted by Charles Bawdin, 1971. to digital edition
- Vol. 4.1. Catalogue of Indonesian Manuscripts. Part 1. / P.Voorhoeve, with a contribution by Carl Schuster, 1975. Link to digital edition
- Vol. 4.2. Catalogue of Indonesian Manuscripts. Part 2. / Th. Pigeaud, F.H. van Naerssen and P.Voorhoeve, 1977. Link to digital edition
- Vol. 5.1. Catalogue of Arabic Manuscripts, Codices Arabici & codices Arabici additamenta / Ali Abdalhussein Alhaidary and Stig T. Rasmussen, 1995.
- Vol. 5.2. Catalogue of Arabic manuscripts, Codices Arabici & codices Arabici additamenta / Irmeli Perho, 2003.
- Vol. 5.3. Book 1-3. Catalogue of Arabic manuscripts, Codices Arabici & codices Arabici additamenta / Irmeli Perho, 2007.
- Vol. 6.1-2. Catalogue of Tibetan Manuscripts and Xylographs / Hartmut Buescher and Tarab Tulku, 2000.
- Vol. 7.1 Catalogue of Sanskrit Manuscripts / Hartmut Buescher, 2011.
- Vol. 8.1. Catalogue of Persian manuscripts / Irmeli Perho, 2014.
- Vol. 9. Catalogue of Chinese manuscripts and rare books / Bent Lerbæk Pedersen, 2014.
- Vol. 10.1. Catalogue of Japanese manuscripts and rare books / Merete Pedersen, 2015.
- Vol. 10.2. Catalogue of Korean manuscripts and rare books / Bent Lerbæk Pedersen, 2014.
