= Sagaan Ubgen =

Mongol mythology

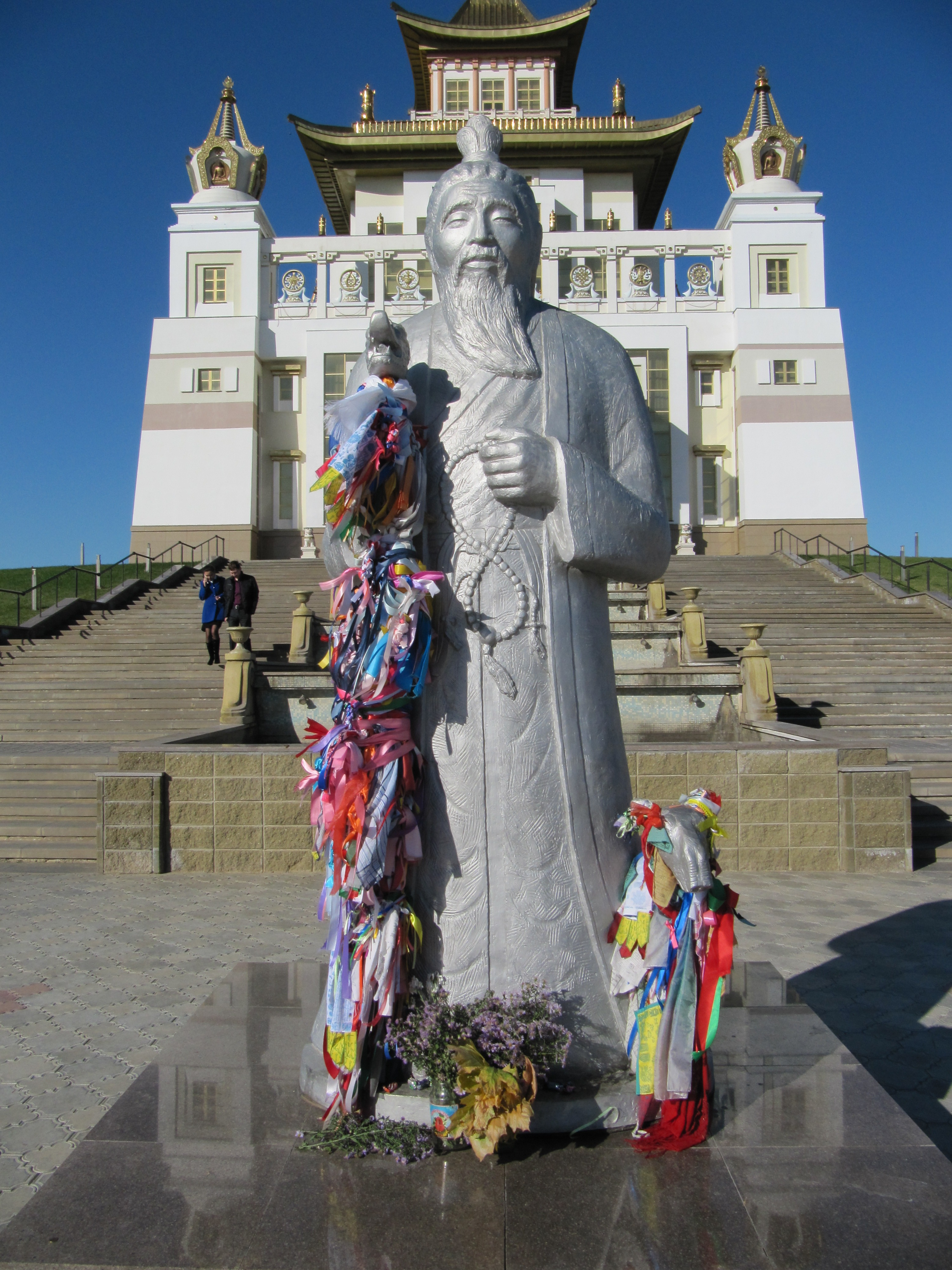
In the Kalmyk language the name is Цаган Авга/Цаган Аав. This statue of Tsagan Aav stands in front of the Golden Temple of Śākyamuni Buddha in Elista, Kalmykia.

Tsagaan Ubgen (Note: Various alternative transliterations of the name into the English alphabet exist including Tsagaan Uvgun, Tsagaan Övgön (as used in Blunden 2008), Tsagaan Ebugen (as used in Wilkinson 2009), and Cagan Öbö (as used in de Nebesky-Wojkowitz 1976).) ("The elder White", "White Old Man"; Mongolian: (Дэлхийн) цагаан өвгөн Buryat: Сагаан үбгэн Russian: Белый Старец) is the Mongolian guardian of life and longevity, one of the symbols of fertility and prosperity in the Buddhist pantheon. He is worshiped as a deity in what scholars have called "white shamanism", a subdivision of what scholars have called "Buryat yellow shamanism"—that is, a tradition of shamanism that "incorporate[s] Buddhist rituals and beliefs" and is influenced specifically by Tibetan Buddhism. Sagaan Ubgen originated in Mongolia.

In some versions of the mythology, Sagaan Ubgen the White Elder is the partner of Itügen, Mother Earth, also known as Etügen Eke.

== Syncretic incorporation into the Buddhist pantheon ==
The modern Mongolian and Buryat Buddhist pantheons include Tsagaan Ubgen, like many other figures in those pantheons, as a result of syncretism with the indigenous shamanism of the region. Before the introduction of Buddhism to Mongolia and Buryatia, he was the deity of longevity, wealth, and fertility. To account for his continued veneration as part of Buddhist practice, narratives have been added to his existing mythology, providing tales of how he was converted to Buddhism, and making him a patron of the latter religion, at the same time that he continues in his previous, more worldly, religious functions. One version of the story relates how, while the Buddha and his disciples were out walking one day, they met Tsagaan Ubgen, who so impressed the Buddha with his wisdom that he (Buddha) declared Tsagaan Ubgen to be a "saint". A different version of the tale has Tsagaan Ubgen as one of two hunters, the other being Hara Ubgen (Хара Эбуген), who, out hunting, encounter Milarepa in Milarepa's Cave. Milarepa persuades them to give up hunting and to take up the teaching of Buddhism.

== Appearance and iconography ==
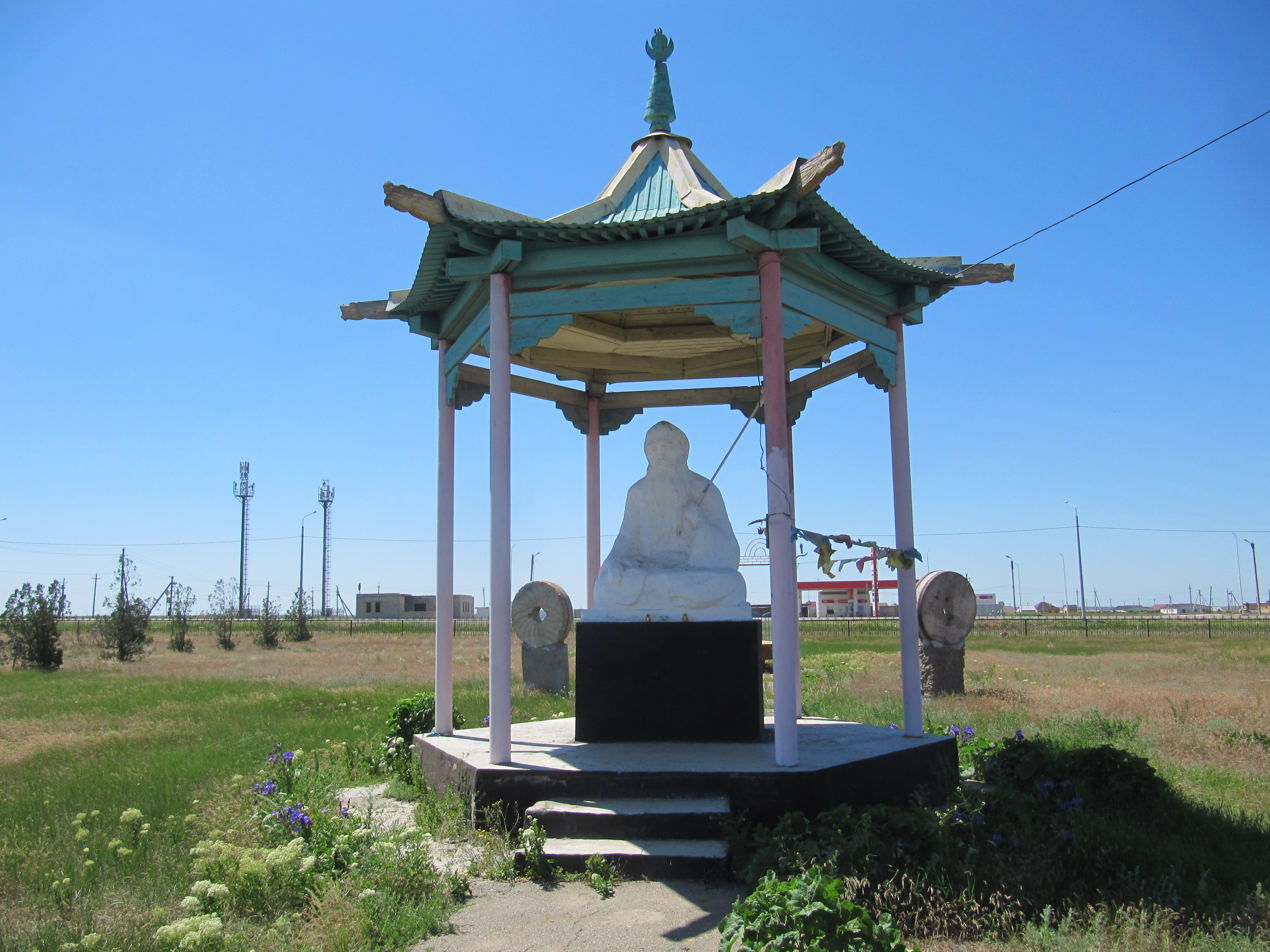

Tsagaan Ubgen is often depicted similarly to the Tibetan deity Gyalpo Pehar, or to the Chinese god Old Man of the South Pole, who like Tsagaan Ubgen is a patron deity of family longevity, wealth, and health. His conventional appearance is that of a bald old man with a white beard. He carries a dragon-headed staff and the book of destiny and is traditionally accompanied by a deer and a peach tree.

== In Mongolian tsam and Tibetan cham dances ==
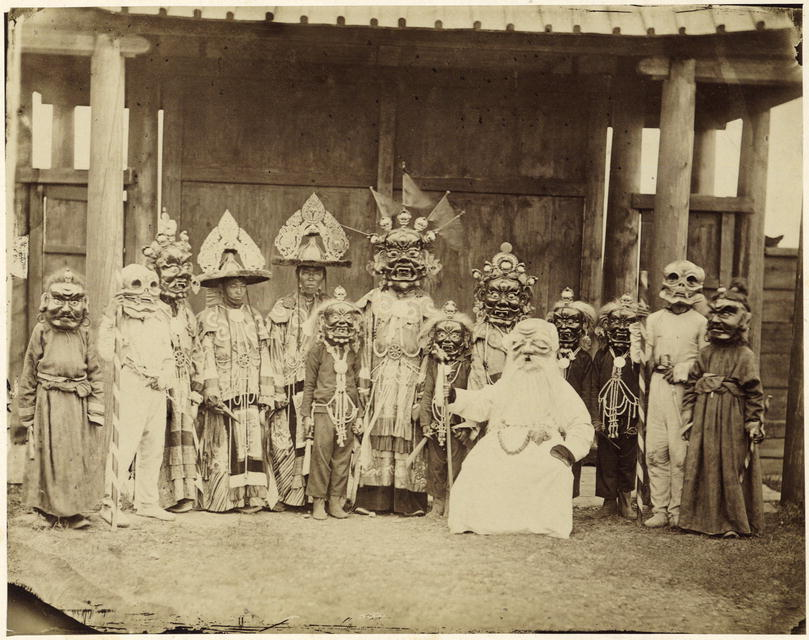
In this 1880 picture of a tsam dance troupe, Sagaan Ubgen is seated at front right.

Tsagaan Ubgen has the same kindly bald old man with a white beard appearance in the Mongolian version of the Cham dance. There, he appears alongside other masked characters representing other syncretic Buddhist gods such as Begtse, Mahākāla, and the Garuda; and is one of the few characters in the dance who is able to speak.

The Elder White character was imported from the Cham dance into the Tibetan Cham in the 20th century by order of the 13th Dalai Lama, who had a dream during his exile in Mongolia. He is named rgan po dkar po, or simply rgan dkar, in Tibetan, and was first introduced into the Cham dance as part of the New Year's dance of the Potala Palace at Namgyal Monastery. From there, he spread to cham dance in other monasteries throughout Tibet.

In the Cham dance, Tsagaan Ubgen, dressed all in white with a snuff bottle attached to his girdle, is the main character in the "Tiger Dance", which symbolizes the transition to the new year from the old. He enters the dance area weak and staggering, or even being carried. After symbolically killing a tiger by striking a tiger skin with a stick, his strength is renewed. In some variations of the dance, he then proceeds to pass among the audience seeking donations of money, sometimes offering a peck of snuff from his bottle in return. In other variations, he begins to drink alcohol and continue dancing until he is too drunk to dance.
