= Sülde Tngri =

Deity in Mongolian shamanism

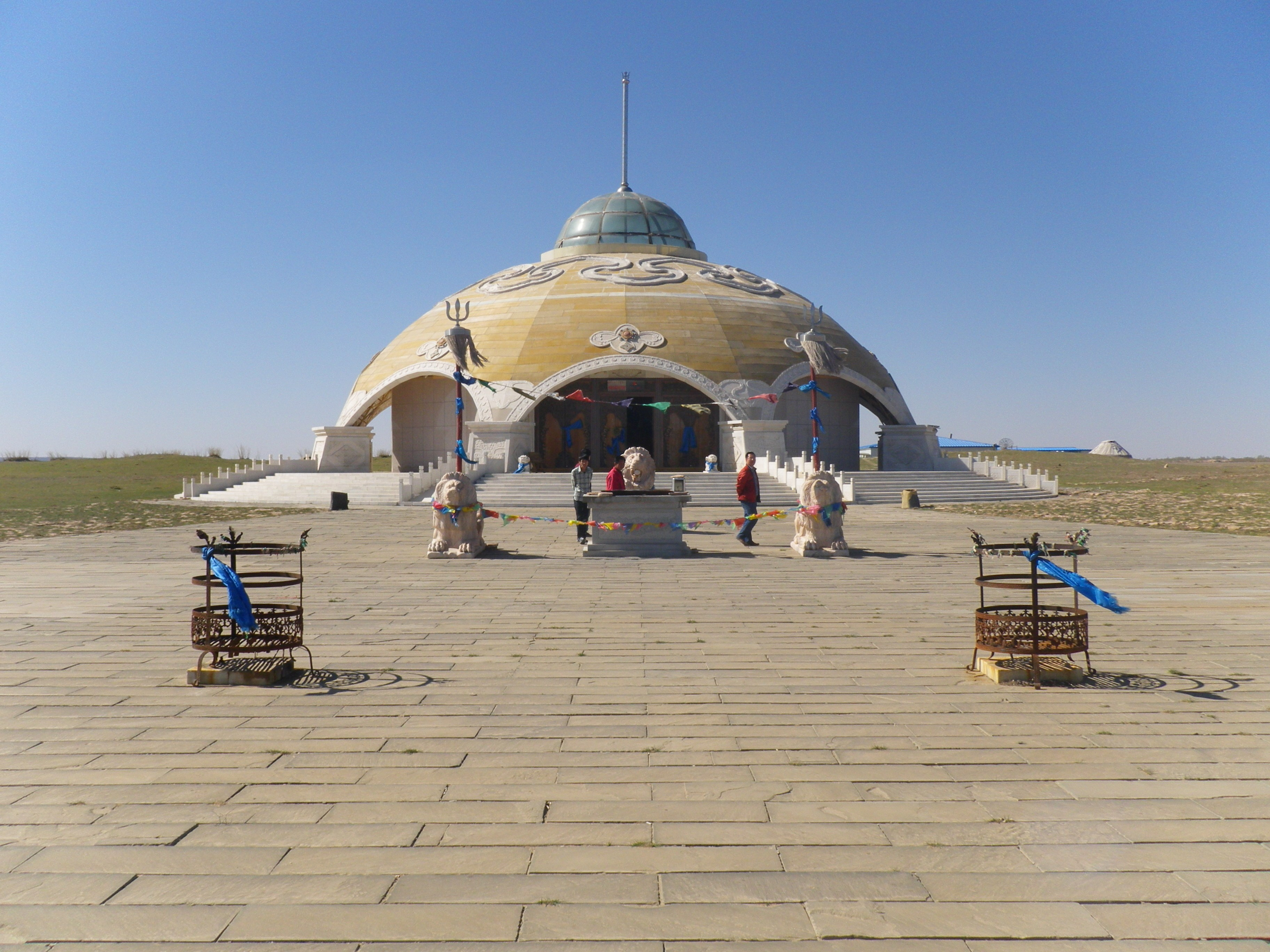
Temple of the Sülde Tngri in the town of Uxin Banner in Inner Mongolia, China, in the Ordos Desert.

Sülde Tngri is an equestrian war god, one of the tngri, the highest group of divinities in Mongolian shamanism and Buddhism. He is usually depicted as an armored warrior riding a horse. In Mongolian shamanism, everyone possesses a guardian spirit, called a sülde. "Sülde Tngri" can refer to the sülde of any great leader, but it primarily refers to the deified sülde of Genghis Khan. As a war god, Sülde Tngri's primary function is protecting his devotees from their enemies and aiding them in battles against their foes.

== Descriptions and appearance ==
The exact details of Sülde Tngri's appearance and entourage vary among artwork of him. He has been illustrated as a man wearing armor and a helmet adorned by triangular flags or banners, armed with a club and wreathed in fire. He is mounted on a yellow horse, tended to by a servant clothed in white. In this portrayal, he has a demon held captive. Another description has Sülde Tngri clothed in white silk and carrying both a spear and a lance, riding a white horse. In other images, he has been represented by a man with a spear and a flag, riding a horse.

== Rituals and symbolism ==
Sülde Tngri's primary sphere of influence is protection from mortal enemies. Rituals invoking his aid usually describe him and his entourage only briefly, but some give more elaborate, detailed accounts of his interventions. He is the major local god around the Muna community, although his status as a minor god elsewhere is simultaneously acknowledged.

=== Association with Genghis Khan ===
Sülde Tngri is most often identified with Genghis Khan. As his sülde, Sülde Tngri represents the embodiment of Genghis Khan in his martial character, excluding the other aspects of the historical figure's personality. The white horse that sometimes appears in descriptions of Sülde Tngri has been thought to represent Genghis's deified horse. In illustrations, the god and the mortal man resemble each other; this has created some confusion over which entity is being portrayed. Sülde Tngri is also sometimes confused with similar equestrian warrior deities, such as Dayisun Tngri.
