= Arshi (folklore) =

God found in Mongolian Buddhism and Tengri Paganism

Arshi, is a god who is associated with the fire ritual as practiced in Mongol mythology. The epithet is found in a prayer by the 18th-century lama Mergen Gegen Lubsangdambijalsan, where it is added to the name of the "Khan of the fire". "Arshi" derives from Sanskrit rsi; "tngri" refers to the 99 tngri or Mongolian deities.

== See also ==
- Mongolian shamanism
