= Etugen Eke =

Earth goddess in Turkic-Mongolic mythologies

Etügen Eke ("Mother Earth", also transliterated variously as Itügen or Etügen Ekhe) is an earth goddess in Tengrism and Turkic or Mongolic mythology. She was believed to be perpetually virginal. The word "etugen" associates with woman and daughter of Kayra. Also her name may have originated from Ötüken, the holy mountain of the earth and fertility goddess of the ancient Turks. Medieval sources sometimes pair Etugen with a male counterpart named Natigai or Nachigai (Natikai, Natıkay), although this is probably a mistake based on a mispronunciation of Etugen. In mythology Etugen is often represented as a young woman riding a grey bull.

== Etymology ==
"Eke" means mother, while Etugen is also often referred to as "dayir" (meaning brown, derived from Old Turkic), and she is described as the brown skinned Mother Earth.

== Mother Earth ==
Etugen existed in the middle of the Universe. The Turkic people depicted Etugen as a voluptuous, beautiful woman, who was patroness of the Homeland and nature. All living beings were subordinate to her. Therefore, the Turkic people viewed Etugen as the second highest deity, after Kök-Tengri. The dominant role in determining the fate of people and nations belonged to Tengri, but natural forces yielded to Etugen. Sometimes on Tengri's command, Etugen punished people for their sins. But she was generally considered a benevolent Goddess. To appease the goddess Etugen, sacrifices were made every spring in preparation for the cattle-breeding season and before planting crops. Sacrifices were also conducted in the autumn, after the completion of the harvest. During the times of the Khaganates, sacrifices to Etugen had a nationwide character. They were conducted near rivers and on the banks of lakes. A reddish horse was sacrificed with appeals for the fertility of cattle and crops, and for general well being.

== Bibliography ==
- Heissig, Walther (1980). "The cult of the earth and the cult of heights". The Religions of Mongolia. University of California Press. ISBN 9780520038578.
- Dixon-Kennedy, Mike (1998). "Itugen". Encyclopedia of Russian and Slavic Myth and Legend. ABC-CLIO. ISBN 9781576070635.
- Kollmar-Paulenz, Karénina (2012). "Embodying the Dharma". In Keul, István (ed.). Transformations and Transfer of Tantra in Asia and Beyond. Religion and Society. Vol. 52. Walter de Gruyter. pp. 253 et seq. ISBN 9783110258110.
