= Qormusta Tngri =

Mongolian chief of the gods

Qormusta Tengri (Cyrillic: Хурмаста, Хормуста-тенгри, Хан-Хурмаста; from the Sogdian Хурмазта/Khurmazta; also transliterated as Qormusata (Tngri), Khormusta (Tngri), Hormusta (Tngri), and Qormusda (Tngri)) is a god in Tengrism and shamanism, described as the chief god of the 99 tngri and leader of the 33 gods.

According to Walther Heissig, the group of 33 gods led by Qormusata Tngri exists alongside the well-known group of 99 tngri. Qormusata Tngri derives his name from Ahura Mazda. He is analogous to the Indian Buddhist deity Śakra (to whom Michael York compares him, as a more active being), ruler of the Buddhist heaven of the Thirty-three. Qormusata Tngri leads those 33, and in early texts is also mentioned as leading the 99 tngri. He is connected to the origin of fire: "Buddha struck the light and 'Qormusata Tngri lit the fire'." A fable of a fox describes a fox so clever that even Qormusata Tngri (as the head of the 99 tingri) falls prey to him; in a folktale, Boldag ugei boru ebugen ("The impossible old man, Boru"), he is the sky god with the crow and the wolf as his "faithful agents".

Qormusata Tngri is identified with Esrua Tngri, and Brahma through that. "Esrua Tngri", although derived from Zurvan (who was used to translate Brahma in Sogdian Buddhist texts), is phonetically similar to "Esrün Tngri" (the Mongolian rendering of "Indra"), which probably explains the equation.

Qormusata Tngri's relatively recent entrance into the pantheon is also indicated by the attempts on the part of Mergen Gegen Lubsangdambijalsan (1717-1766?) to replace earlier shamanist gods in the liturgy with five Lamaist gods including Qormusata Tngri. In one text, he is presented as the father of the 17th-century cult figure Sagang Sechen, who is at the same time an incarnation of Vaiśravaṇa, one of the Four Heavenly Kings in Buddhism.

== In Manichaeism ==
In Manichaeism, the name Ohrmazd Bay ("god Ahura Mazda") was used for the primal figure Nāšā Qaḏmāyā, the "original man" and emanation of the Father of Greatness (sometimes called Zurvan) through whom after he sacrificed himself to defend the world of light was consumed by the forces of darkness. Although Ormuzd is freed from the world of darkness his "sons", often called his garments or weapons, remain. His sons, later known as the World Soul, after a series of events will for the most part escape from matter and return again to the world of light where they came from.

== In Buddhism ==
In Sogdian Buddhism, Xurmuzt or Hürmüz was the name used in place of Ahura Mazda. Via contacts with Buddhists, this Sogdian name also came Shamans, who still name this deity Qormusta Tengri; Qormusta (or Qormusda) is now a popular enough deity to appear in many contexts that are not explicitly Buddhist.

== See also ==
- Śakra (Buddhism)
- Ahura Mazda

== Bibliography ==
- Heissig, Walther (1980). "The cult of the earth and the cult of heights". The Religions of Mongolia. University of California Press. ISBN 9780520038578.
- Heissig, Walther (1990). "New Material on East Mongolian Shamanism". Asian Folklore Studies. 49 (2): 223–33. doi:10.2307/1178034. JSTOR 1178034.
- Heissig, Walther (2001). "Marginalien zur Fuchsgestalt in der Mongolischen Überlieferung". In Hartmut Walravens (ed.). Der Fuchs in Kultur, Religion und Folklore Zentral- und Ostasiens. Otto Harrassowitz Verlag. pp. 17–34. ISBN 9783447043250.
- Jila, Namu (2006). "Myths and Traditional Beliefs about the Wolf and the Crow in Central Asia: Examples from the Turkic Wu-Sun and the Mongols". Asian Folklore Studies. 65 (2): 161–77. JSTOR 30030397.
- Kollmar-Paulenz, Karénina (2012). "Embodying the Dharma". In Keul, István (ed.). Transformations and Transfer of Tantra in Asia and Beyond. Religion and Society. Vol. 52. Walter de Gruyter. pp. 253 et seq. ISBN 9783110258110.
- Morgan, David (2007). The Mongols. The Peoples of Europe. Vol. 12 (2nd ed.). John Wiley & Sons. ISBN 9781405135399.
- Mostaert, Antoine (1957). "Sur le culte de SaΓang sečen et de son bisaieul QutuΓtai sčcen chez les Ordos". Harvard Journal of Asiatic Studies. 20 (3/4): 534–66. doi:10.2307/2718362. JSTOR 2718362.
- York, Michael (2005). Pagan Theology: Paganism as a World Religion. NYU Press. ISBN 9780814797082.
- Sims-Williams, Nicholas (1992), Sogdian and other Iranian inscriptions of the Upper Indus, University of Michigan, ISBN 978-0-7286-0194-9
- Frye, Richard Nelson (1996), The heritage of Central Asia from antiquity to the Turkish expansion, Markus Wiener Publishers, ISBN 978-1-55876-111-7
