= Yellow shamanism =

Form of shamanism practiced in Mongolia and Siberia

Yellow shamanism (Mongolian: Шар бөө) is the term used to designate a particular version of shamanism practiced in Mongolia and Siberia which incorporates rituals and traditions from Buddhism. "Yellow" indicates Buddhism in Mongolia, since most Buddhists there belong to what is called the "Yellow sect" of Tibetan Buddhism, whose members wear yellow hats during services. The term also serves to distinguish it from a form of shamanism not influenced by Buddhism (according to its adherents), called "black shamanism".

== Terminology and background ==
While the applicability of the term "yellow" (or any other term) is still somewhat disputed, scholars consider the variety of shamanism practiced by the Khalka Mongols, the largest population group of Mongolia, to be yellow shamanism; others refer to the shamanism practiced by the Buryats of Siberia as yellow shamanism.

=== Mongolia ===
Buddhism first entered Mongolia during the Yuan dynasty (thirteenth-fourteenth century) and was briefly established as a state religion. The cult of Genghis Khan, who had been accepted into the tngri, the highest pantheon of spirits in Mongolian shamanism, became annexed into Buddhist practice as well. Mongolia itself was at a political and developmental standstill until the sixteenth century, when after the conversion of Altan Khan Buddhism re-established itself. In 1691, after Outer Mongolia had been annexed by the Qing dynasty, Buddhism became the dominant religion of the entire area and shamanism began incorporating Buddhist elements. Violent resistance in the eighteenth century by the hunting tribes of Northern Mongolia against the (Buddhist) ruling group, the Khalk Mongols, led to the foundation of black shamanism.

During the Soviet domination of the Mongolian People's Republic, all varieties of shamanism were repressed; after 1991, when the era of Soviet influence was over, religion (including Buddhism and shamanism) made a comeback.

The term "yellow shamanism" was first introduced in 1992 by Sendenjav Dulam and its use then adopted by Otgony Pürev, who considers it to be the Buddhism-influenced successor of an unbroken practice that goes back to Genghis Khan—that earlier practice was "black shamanism" and was practiced by the Darkhad in defiance of the Buddhism introduced to the area by the Khalka. According to Pürev, the center of yellow shamanism was the Dayan Deerh monastery in Khövsgöl Province, where he found evidence of yellow practices in the recitations and prayers of a shaman born in the province in 1926; he argues that yellow shamanism has by now ceased to exist anywhere.

Opponents argue that Pürev's argument relies too much on the evidence of one single monk from one province, and that it is more likely that yellow shamanism developed as a result of the tension between the Buddhism of the Qing dynasty, for which conversion to Buddhism was in part a colonializing tactic. In agreement with Pürev's argument, though, yellow shamanism is also considered to not have survived Soviet and Communist rule.

=== Buryatia ===
The territory of the Buryats, who live around Lake Baikal, was invaded by the Russian Empire in the seventeenth century, and came to accept Buddhism in the eighteenth century at the same time they were recognizing themselves as Mongol; to which extent Buryat shamanism mixed with Buddhism is a matter of contention among scholars. A nineteenth-century division between black and white shamanism, where black shamanism called on evil deities to bring people misfortune while white shamanism invoked good deities for happiness and prosperity, had completely changed by the twentieth century. Today, black shamanism invokes traditional shamanic deities, whereas white shamanism invokes Buddhist deities and recites Buddhist incantations but wears black shamanist accoutrements. White shamans worship Sagaan Ubgen and Burkhan Garbal (the "Ancestor of Buddhism").

== See also ==
- Gelug
- Shamanism in Siberia
- Dayan Deerh
- Sagaan Ubgen
