= Tngri =

Class of divinities in Mongolian shamanism

In the pantheon of Mongolian shamanism and Tengrism, tngri (also tenger or tengri) constitute the highest class of deities and are attested in sources going back to the 13th century. They are led by different chief deities in different documents and are divided into a number of different groups—including black (terrifying) and white (benevolent), and eastern and western. While there generally seem to be 99 tngri, some documents propose three others (from the north), and while they are generally the highest divinities, some liturgical texts propose an additional group of 33 chief gods alongside the tngri. They were invoked only by the highest shamans and leaders for special occasions; they continue to be venerated especially in black shamanism. Chief among the tngri are Qormusata Tngri and (Khan) Möngke Tngri.

The term tngri is cognate with the Turkic theonym tengri "sky", Mongolian taŋɣaraɣ "oath" and tenger "sky".

== Mongolian pantheon ==
In Mongolian shamanism, tngri constitute the highest class; they are attested already in the oldest written source in Mongolian, The Secret History of the Mongols. The highest deity, Tngri, is the "supreme god of heaven" and is derived from Tengri, the primary chief deity in the religion of the early Turkic and Mongolic peoples, and also goes by Möngke Tngri ("Eternal Heaven") or Erketü Tngri ("Mighty Heaven"); he rules the 99 tngri as Köke Möngke Tngri ("Blue Eternal Heaven"). Associated with him is another chief deity, Qormusata Tngri, described by one scholar as the more active being and compared to the Hindu god of heaven Indra. In addition to the 99 tngri, there are also "seventy-seven levels of Mother Earth" and 33 other gods; the latter, like the tngri, are ruled by Qormusata Tngri.

=== Origin of the tngri ===
Some of the tngri are self-created, a special status, though in later texts some of those tngri were said to have been created by Buddha, a possible influence of Buddhism on Mongolian folk religion. One of those self-created is Khan Möngke Tngri, who created Yesu Hei (the father of Genghis Khan) and the Mother of Fire.

== The tngri and their divisions ==
Klaus Hesse described the complex spiritual hierarchy in clan-based Mongolian society based on sources that go back to the 13th century. The highest group in the pantheon consisted of 99 tngri (55 of them benevolent or "white" and 44 terrifying or "black"), 77 natigai or "earth-mothers", besides others. The tngri were called upon only by leaders and great shamans and were common to all the clans. Black tngri were invoked only by black shamans "against evil from outside and for securing victory in war".

To complicate matters, there is a further division among the 99 tngri: 44 are from the "eastern side", 55 from the "western" side, and there are three or four more that were occasionally added, sometimes from the "northern" side. And among the eastern and western group, there is a division in how the tngri are supplicated: in both group, the greatest multiple of 10 (40 in the east, 50 in the west) are invoked through prayer, the rest (4 in the east, 5 in the west) through sacrifice.

Walther Heissig lists a large number of further divisions—the tngri are made up of groups including the gods of the four corners, five wind gods, five gods of the entrance and five of the door, five of the horizontal, et cetera. He notes that scholars have found a complete enumeration and description of the 99 to be impossible, and that a full list of names mentioned adds up to more than 99, and that local differences occur due to different local gods being accepted and that later sources indicate the further acceptance of Buddhist deities among the tngri. A group of nine supreme tngri occurs regularly, but they are not always the same, though Qormusta Tengri and Möngke Tngri are always included among the "Nine Great Tingri".

== Function ==
The tngri function primarily as protectors. Baγatur Tngri, for instance, is a protector of heroes in warfare, Kisaγa Tngri (an equestrian deity, known as Red Kisant Tngri among the Buryats) protects riches and the souls of people, and Ataγa Tngri is the protector of horses. Many of the functions of the tngri are specifically related to the Mongolian way of existence, especially the herding of cattle; different tngri have very specialized functions pertaining to specific animals and aspects of their raising. There are also tngri invoked for hunting and the growing of fruits and grains.

== See also ==
- Arshi Tengri
- Dayisun Tngri
- Qormusta Tengri
- Sülde Tngri
