= Walther Heissig =

Austrian Mongolist (1913–2005)

Walther Heissig (December 5, 1913 – September 15, 2005) was an Austrian Mongolist.

== Life ==
Heissig was born in Vienna. He studied prehistory, ethnology, historical geography, sinology and Mongolian in Berlin and Vienna, and got his doctoral degree in 1941 in Vienna. Afterwards he traveled to China, worked at the Fu-jen University in Beijing and visited China's Inner Mongolia region. In 1945/46 he had to leave China in an affair about alleged espionage for Japan by German nationals. In 1951 he obtained his habilitation at Göttingen, but, on failing to obtain a position there, he undertook to pursue his second habilitation at the Bonn in 1957. In 1964, he was appointed the Chair of the Central Asian seminar at Bonn University.

== Academic interests ==
His major fields of study were Mongolian history, literature, and also Mongolian maps. He not only made a number of invaluable contributions in the academic field, but also edited several popular books on Mongolian history and culture, for example Ein Volk sucht seine Geschichte. He also published several books on Mongolian epics, proverbs, and folk tales.

He worked extensively on the Epic of King Gesar and other epics circulating in Mongolia. In 1978, he initiated a project for the study of epics. Also, with the help of Heissig, the five-volume series "Folklore mongol" by B. Rinchen was published between 1960–1972, followed by a 13-volume series of epics, Mongolische Epen by Nicholas Poppe. His scientific research work has been acknowledged by elections into various learned societies i.a. he was elected foreign member of the Mongolian Academy of Sciences which is the highest scientific honour in Mongolia.

== A bibliography ==
- Wörterbuch der heutigen mongolische Sprache. Mit kurzem Abriß der Grammatik und ausgewählten Sprachproben. Siebenberg-Verlag, Vienna 1941 (with Robert Bleichsteiner)
- Das gelbe Vorfeld: die Mobilisierung der chinesischen Außenländer, 1941
- Der mongolische Kulturwandel in den Hsingan-Provinzen Mandschukuos, 1944
- Über mongolische Landkarten, 1944
- Bolur erike, 1946 (as editor)
- Some glosses on recent mongol studies, 1953
- Neyici toyin, 1953
- Die Pekinger lamaistischen Blockdrucke in mongolischer Sprache: Materialien zur mongolischen Literaturgeschichte, 1954
- Ostmongolische Reise, 1955
- Wort aus tausend Jahren: Weisheit der Steppe, 1956
- Zur Entstehungsgeschichte d. Mongolischen Kandjur-Redaktion d. Ligdan Khan-Zeit (1623–1629), 1957
- Mongγol borǰigid oboγ-un teüke = Meng-ku shih-hsi-p'u, 1957 (as editor, with Charles Bawden)
- Altan kürdün mingγan gegesütü bicig: eine mongolische Chronik von Siregetü Guosi Dharma (1739), 1958 (as editor)
- Die Familien- und Kirchengeschichtsschreibung der Mongolen I & II, 1959 and 1965
- Mongolische Handschriften, Blockdrucke, Landkarten ( = Verzeichnis der orientalischen Handschriften in Deutschland, vol. I), 1961
- Erdeni-yin erike: mongolische Chronik der lamaistischen Klosterbauten der Mongolei von Isibaldan (1835), 1961 (as editor)
- Beiträge zur Übersetzungsgeschichte des mongolischen buddhistischen Kanons, 1962
- Helden-, Höllenfahrts- und Schelmengeschichten der Mongolen, 1962 (as editor)
- Bolur Toli "Spiegel aus Bergkristall", 1962 (as editor)
- Mongolische Volksmärchen, 1963 (as editor)
- Ein Volk sucht seine Geschichte: die Mongolen und die verlorenen Dokumente ihrer grossen Zeit, 1964 (English translation: A lost civilization; the Mongols rediscovered, London 1966)
- Mongolische Ortsnamen I-III (= Verzeichnis der orientalischen Handschriften in Deutschland, suppl. vol. V), 1966 - 1981 (as editor)
- Mongolische volksreligiöse und folkloristische Texte aus europäischen Bibliotheken (= Verzeichnis der orientalischen Handschriften in Deutschland, suppl. vol. VI), 1966 (as editor)
- Collectanea Mongolica: Festschrift für Prof. Dr. Rintchen zum 60. Geburtstag, 1966 (as editor)
- Die mongolische Steininschrift und Manuskriptfragmente aus Olon süme in der Inneren Mongolei, 1966
- Mongolistik an deutschen Universitäten, 1968
- Catalogue of Mongol books, manuscripts and xylographs (= Catalogue of oriental manuscripts, xylographs etc. in Danish collections, vol. III), 1971.
- Mongoleireise zur späten Goethezeit: Berichte und Bilder von der russischen Gesandtschaftsreise 1805/06 (= Verzeichnis der orientalischen Handschriften in Deutschland, suppl. vol. XIII), 1971 (as editor)
- Geschichte der mongolischen Literatur (two vols.), 1972
- Schriftliche Quellen in Mogholi (as editor), 1974
- Die mongolischen Handschriften-Reste aus Olon süme, Innere Mongolei (16. - 17. Jhdt.) (as editor), 1976
- Tractata altaica: Denis Sinor sexagenario optime de rebus altaicis merito dedicata (as editor), 1976
- Altaica collecta: Berichte u. Vorträge d. XVII. Permanent Internat. Altaistic Conference, 3.-8. Juni 1974 in Bonn, Bad Honnef (as editor), 1976
- Die mongolischen Epen: Bezüge, Sinndeutung u. Überlieferung (as editor), 1979
- Die mongolischen Heldenepen: Struktur u. Motive, 1979
- Die Zeit des letzten mongolischen Großkhans Ligdan (1604–1634), 1979
- Geser-rëdzia-wu: Dominik Schröders nachgelassene Monguor (Tujen)-Version des Geser-Epos aus Amdo (as editor), 1980
- Die Geheime Geschichte der Mongolen (as editor), 1981
- Geser-Studien: Untersuchungen zu d. Erzählstoffen in d. "neuen" Kapiteln d. mongolischen Geser-Zyklus, 1983
- Westliche Motivparallelen in zentralasiatischen Epen, 1983
- Dschingis Khan-Ein Weltreich zu Pferde (as editor), 1985
- Tsakhar-Märchen: Nach Aufzeichnungen aus dem Jahre 1938/39 (as editor), 1985
- Geschichte der Mongolen und ihres Fürstenhauses, 1985
- Erzählstoffe rezenter mongolischer Heldendichtung (2 vols.), 1988
- Gedanke und Wirkung: Festschrift zum 90. Geburtstag von Nicholas Poppe (as editor), 1989
- Die Mongolen (exhibition catalogue, 2 vols., as editor), 1989
- “New Material on East Mongolian Shamanism,” Asian Folklore Studies, Vol. 49, No. 2. (1990), pp. 223–233.
- “Tracing Some Mongol Oral Motifs in a Chinese Prosimetric Ming Novel of 1478, Asian Folklore Studies, Vol. 53, No. 2. (1994), pp. 227-254
- Formen und Funktion mündlicher Tradition. 1995.
- “The Present State of the Mongolian Epic and Some Topics for Future Research.” Oral Tradition 11/1 (1996): 85-98.
- (with Geoffrey Samuel) The Religions of Mongolia
- Mongolische Epen VIII
- Heldenmärchen versus Heldenepos? Strukturelle Fragen zur Entwicklung altaischer Heldenmärchen Opladen: Westdeutscher Verlag, 1991.

== Works about Walther Heissig ==
- Taube, Erika. “Walther Heissig (5 December 1913-5 September 2005): in memoriam.(Obituary)”. Asian Folklore Studies, April, 2006
- Serta tibeto-mongolica: Festschrift für Walther Heissig zum 60. Geburtstag am 5.12.1973,
- Documenta barbarorum, 1983
