= Mongolian manuscript maps =

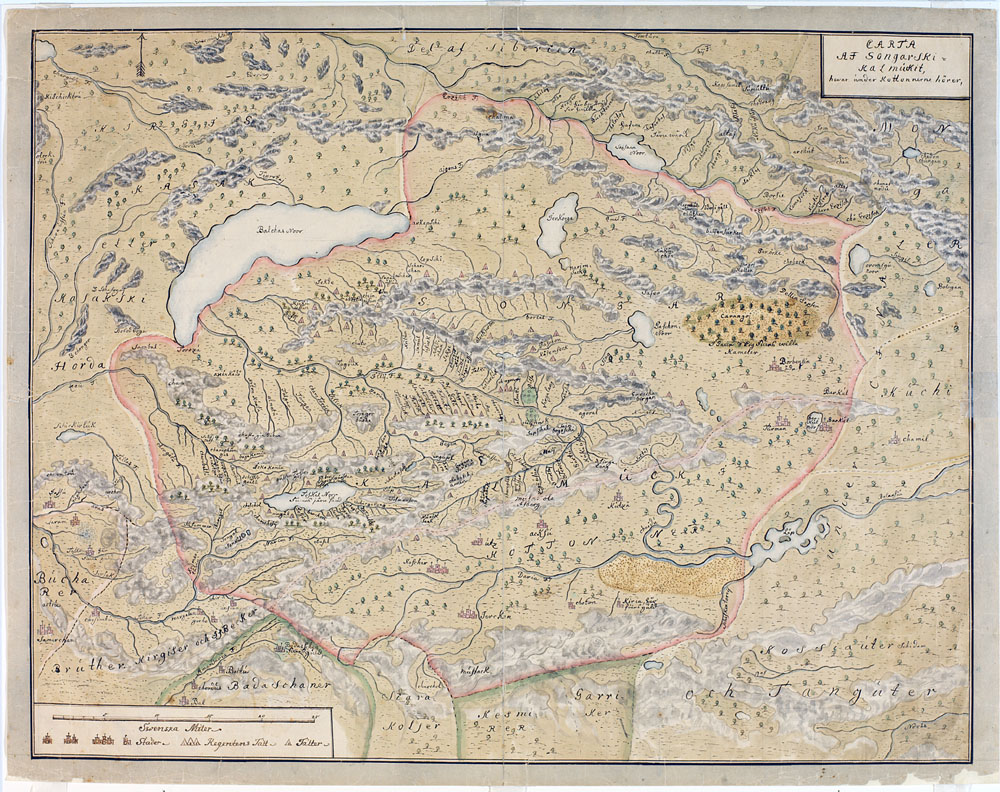
A map of Dzungaria, brought to Sweden by Johan Gustaf Renat.

Mongolian manuscript maps usually mapped administrative divisions (leagues, banners or aimags) of Mongolia during the Qing dynasty. They gave a bird's eye view of the area depicted, making them somewhat similar to pictorial maps. Such manuscript maps have been used for official purposes by the Qing government since the 17th century, and new maps continued to be drawn until at least the 1930s.

Although the roots of Mongolian cartography are probably older, the manuscript maps known today were all produced after 1690, when the Lifanyuan in Beijing ordered all Mongolian nobles to produce maps of their territory. Updated maps were to be made every ten years and sent to the Lifanyuan. The maps show major geographic features, and give the positions of those (usually 24 or 48) ovoos that marked the border. The maps normally had Mongolian captions, some were bilingual, others bear small slips of paper with the Chinese translation of the Mongolian names.

Mongolian manuscript maps were first brought to the attention of European scientists by August Strindberg, who in 1878 wrote an article about Dzungarian maps brought to Sweden by Johan Gustaf Renat.

Old Mongolian maps also played a role in the Japanese claims about the western border of Manchuguo in the run-up to the Battle of Khalkhin Gol.
