= Dayan Deerh =

Dayan Deerh or Dayan Degereki is one of the most important divinities in the folk practices and shamanic invocations in Khövsgöl Province, Mongolia. His cult is linked to fertility rites which are practiced in yellow shamanism (which incorporates Buddhist ritual and belief) as well as in black shamanism (a less Buddhist-influenced type of shamanism). He is still venerated, especially on the eastern side of Lake Khövsgöl.

== Origin and cult ==
Dayan Deerh is worshiped in both yellow shamanism and the less Buddhism-influenced black shamanism, though black shamans around Khövsgöl Nuur often do not accept him since he is popular among the yellow shamans. One explanation is that Dayan Deerh would have betrayed the black shamans by going over to the Buddhist side. Agnes Birtalan proposed that he began his career as a fertility god, then became a spirit particularly for shamans, and ended up as a protector.

As a fertility god, he granted cattle and children to people, and was a shaman for Genghis Khan with whose wife or daughter he eloped. He can only be killed by suffocation (fire and metal cannot hurt him) and in return for not being threatened by the Khan with such a death he becomes a protector of him and his people. There is also a tradition of rivalry between Dayan Deerh and the Dalai Lama; still, syncretism between the two religious traditions is suggested by the fact that Dayan Deerh became a protector of yellow shamanism. Moreover, his statue is venerated by the Lamas of the Deerkhiin Khüree monastery. Both Khalka and Buryat Mongols revere him, and in addition to promoting fertility he also functions as a patron to shamanic initiation.

A statue of the god was venerated in Tsagaannuur, Khövsgöl, where his cult was particularly strong; it appears that Dayan Deerh had turned himself into a stone statue, according to sacral texts collected by Birtalan, and that warriors of Genghis Khan unsuccessfully tried to destroy it. The statue disappeared possibly in 1929 or in the 1950s, and later a Buddhist shrine newly established in a former hotel took over that function, where a new cult has now formed. In 1998, Birtalan recorded a number of incantations from Xǖxenĵĭ, the descendant of a shamaness—two longer ones (a prayer and an invocation) and three shorter ones dedicated to Dayan Deerh. Xǖxenĵĭ, whose family lived in Renchinlkhümbe, Khövsgöl, in the Darkhad Valley, said she came under the protection of Dayan Deerh when they moved to the eastern side of Lake Khövsgöl.

One other place of his cult is a cave near the border between Russia and Mongolia, kept out of sight and accessible only by horseback. Even during the communist regime of the Mongolian People's Republic (1924–1992) it was continuously worshiped. A Buddhist warrior god statue is placed in the center of the cave and is almost completely covered by khatas. Nearby, purifying rituals are held.

== Depictions ==
Dayan Deerh is often depicted as equestrian, wearing at least some typically Mongolian attributes (Birtalan mentions boots). He typically has a triple shamanic feather crown including three mirrors, though statues have a warrior helmet. In a scroll image owned by a monk in Mörön, he carries a mirror around his neck, intended to ward off evil spirits, an attribute used also by shamans; a necklace consisting of beads "indicates the coexistence of Buddhism and shamanism".

== Monastery ==
The deity also gave his name to a monastery in Tsagaannuur, Dayan Deerh Sharavlyn Khüree, where yellow shamans venerate him within Buddhist confines, the name of the monastery indicating its shamanic origins. According to Otgony Pürev, the monastery was built in 1860 and rebuilt in 1922 after burning down.
