= Black shamanism =

Form of Mongolian shamanism rejecting Buddhist influence

Black shamanism (Mongolian: Хар бөө) is a kind of shamanism practiced in Mongolia and Siberia. It is specifically opposed to yellow shamanism, which incorporates rituals and traditions from Buddhism. Black Shamans are usually perceived as working with evil spirits, while white Shamans with spirits of the upper world.

Black shamans were thought to be able to stop demons by conversing with the spirits of human dead, turn into animals, fly, and go into trances.

Buddhism entered Mongolia in the 16th century after the conversion of Altan Khan. In 1691, after Outer Mongolia had been annexed by the Qing Dynasty, Buddhism became the dominant religion of the entire area and shamanism began incorporating Buddhist elements. Violent resistance in the 18th century by the hunting tribes of Northern Mongolia against the (Buddhist) ruling group, the Khalka Mongols, led to the foundation of black shamanism.

== Spirit world and class ==
Klaus Hesse described the complex spiritual hierarchy in clan-based Mongolian society based on sources that go back to the 13th century. The highest group in the pantheon consisted of 99 tengri (55 of them benevolent or "white" and 44 terrifying or "black"), 77 natigai or "earth-mothers", besides others. The tengri were called upon only by leaders and great shamans and were common to all the clans. After these, three groups of ancestral spirits dominated. The "Lord-Spirits" were the souls of clan leaders to whom any member of a clan could appeal for physical or spiritual help. The "Protector-Spirits" included the souls of great shamans (ĵigari) and shamanesses (abĵiya). The "Guardian-Spirits" were made up of the souls of smaller shamans (böge) and shamanesses (idugan) and were associated with a specific locality (including mountains, rivers, etc.) in the clan's territory.

The difference between great, white and small, black (in shamans, tngri, etc.) was also formative in a class division of three further groups of spirits, made up of "spirits who were not introduced by shamanist rites into the communion of ancestral spirits" but who could nonetheless be called upon for help—they were called "'the three accepting the supplications' (jalbaril-un gurban)". The whites were of the nobles of the clan, the blacks of the commoners, and a third category consisted of "the evil spirits of the slaves and non-human goblins". White shamans could only venerate white spirits (and if they called upon black spirits they "lost their right in venerating and calling the white spirits"), black shamans only black spirits (and would be too terrified to call upon white spirits since the black spirits would punish them). Black or white was assigned to spirits according to social status, and to shamans "according to the capacity and assignment of their ancestral spirit or spirit of the shaman's descent line."

== Black shamanism in Mongolia ==
According to Otgony Purev, the practice goes back to Genghis Khan and was practiced by the Darkhad people in defiance of the Buddhism introduced to the area by the Khalka. During the communist domination of the Mongolian People's Republic, all varieties of shamanism were suppressed by the communist government; after 1991, religion (including Buddhism and shamanism) made a comeback.

== See also ==
- Dayan Deerh
- Shamanism in Siberia
- Tengri
