= Religion in Northeast China =

Religion in northeast China (Note: Some of the data collected by the Chinese General Social Survey (CGSS) of 2009 and by the Chinese Spiritual Life Survey (CSLS) of 2007 have been reported and assembled by Xiuhua Wang (2015) in order to confront the proportion of people identifying with two similar social structures: ① Christian churches, and ② the traditional Chinese religion of the lineage (i. e. people believing and worshipping ancestral deities often organised into lineage "churches" and ancestral shrines). Data for other religions with a significant presence in China (deity cults, Buddhism, Taoism, folk religious sects, Islam, et al.) were not reported by Wang and come from different sources.)
1. Chinese religion (including northeastern variations, Chinese Buddhism, Confucians and Taoists), or not religious people (58.8%)
2. Shanrendao (Note: Assuming that the percentage of adherents to the doctrines of Wang Fengyi's Universal Church of the Way and its Virtue (today popularly known as Shanrendao) has remained the same as in the 1930s (25% of the population).) (25.0%)
3. Chinese ancestral religion (7.73%)
4. Buddhism (Note: Based on a 2006 survey of the distribution of Buddhist institutions in China, assuming that the percentage of institutions per capita is consistent with the percentage of Buddhists (which has been proved so by data on other regions), the Buddhist religion would account for 9-10% of the population of Heilongjiang and 4-5% of the population of Jilin. The Buddhist population of Liaoning has been calculated by the CFPS survey of 2012 and the result is 5.5%. Calculating the absolute number of people represented by these percentages on the provinces' total populations in 2010, summing the absolute numbers obtained the result is 6,952,638 Buddhists. On the total 2010 population of northeast China (109,520,844) they represent the 6.3%.) (6.30%)
5. Christianity (2.15%)
6. Islam (Note: As of 2010 there are 26,700 Muslims in Liaoning, 12,700 in Jilin and 12,700 in Heilongjiang. The total 52,100 is 0.04% of the population of northeast China.) (0.04%)

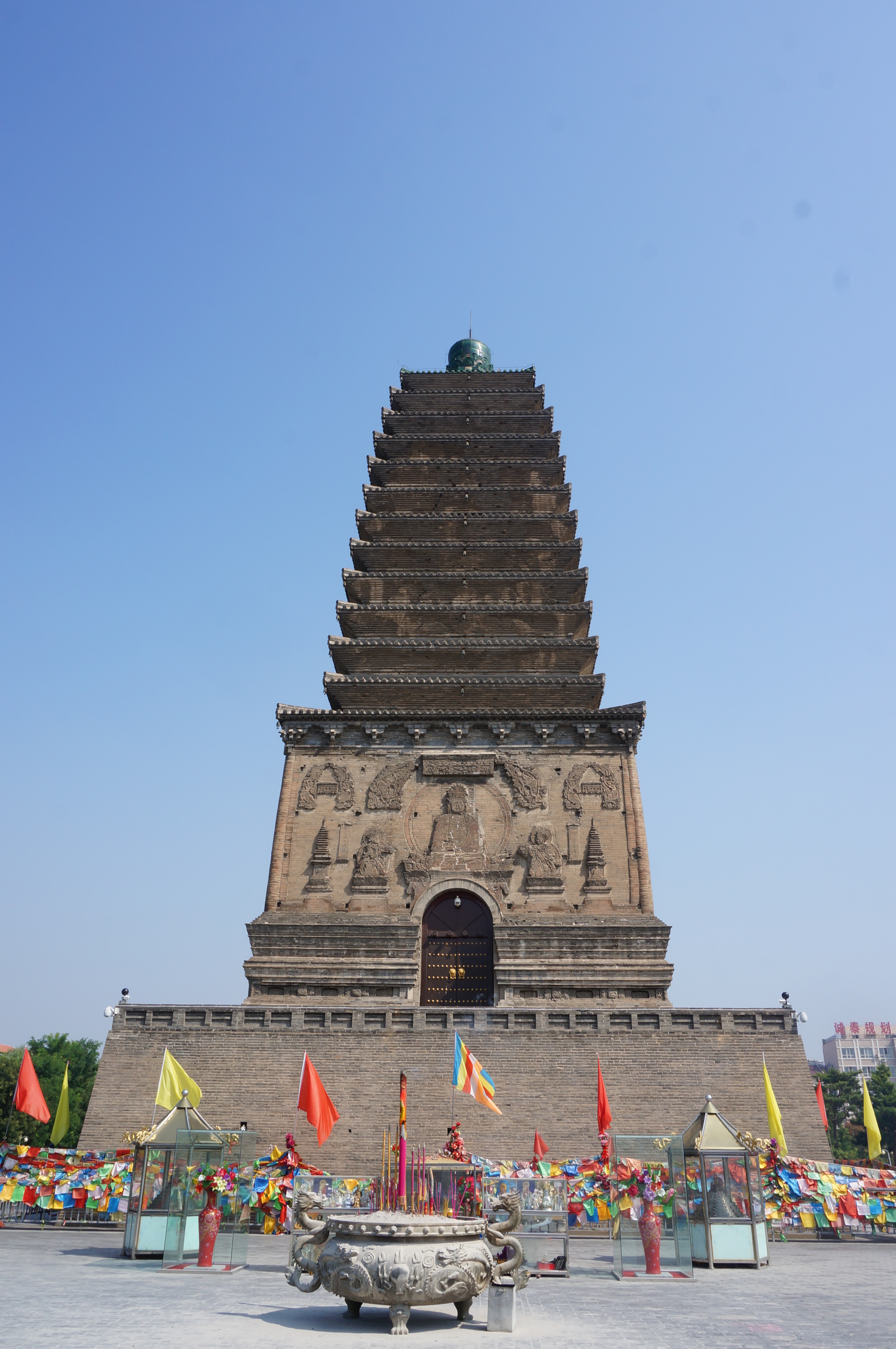
Northern Buddhist pagoda of Chaoyang, Liaoning.

The predominant religions in Northeast China (including the provinces of Liaoning, Jilin and Heilongjiang, historically also known as Manchuria) are Chinese folk religions led by local shamans. Taoism and Chinese Buddhism were never well established in this region of recent Han Chinese settlement (Han people began to be a large part of the population only by the Qing dynasty). For this reason the region has been a hotbed for folk religious and Confucian churches, which provide a structure, clergy, scriptures and ritual to the local communities. The Way of the Return to the One, the Universal Church of the Way and its Virtue (Shanrendao), and more recently the Falun Gong, have been the most successful sects in Manchuria, claiming millions of followers. Schools of Tibetan Buddhism, traditionally transmitted by the region's Mongol minorities, have made inroads also among Han Chinese.

The period of the Japanese occupation (1931) and the establishment of an independent Manchukuo (1932–1945), saw the development of Japanese scholarship on the local religion, and later the establishment of Shinto shrines and sects.

The native Manchu population, today mostly assimilated to the Han Chinese, practices Han religions but has also maintained pure Manchu shamanism. The local Chinese folk religion has developed many patterns inherited from Manchu and Tungus shamanism, making it different from central and southern folk religion.

According to surveys conducted in 2007 and 2009, 7.73% of the population believes and is involved in cults of ancestors, while 2.15% of the population identifies as Christian. The reports didn't give figures for other types of religion; 90.12% of the population may be either irreligious or involved in worship of nature deities, Buddhism, Confucianism, Taoism, folk religious sects, and small minorities of Muslims. The Mongol minority mostly practices Mongolian folk religion and Tibetan-originated schools of Buddhism, while the Korean minority is mostly affiliated to Korean shamanism and Christianity.

== Main religions ==
=== Chinese traditional religion ===
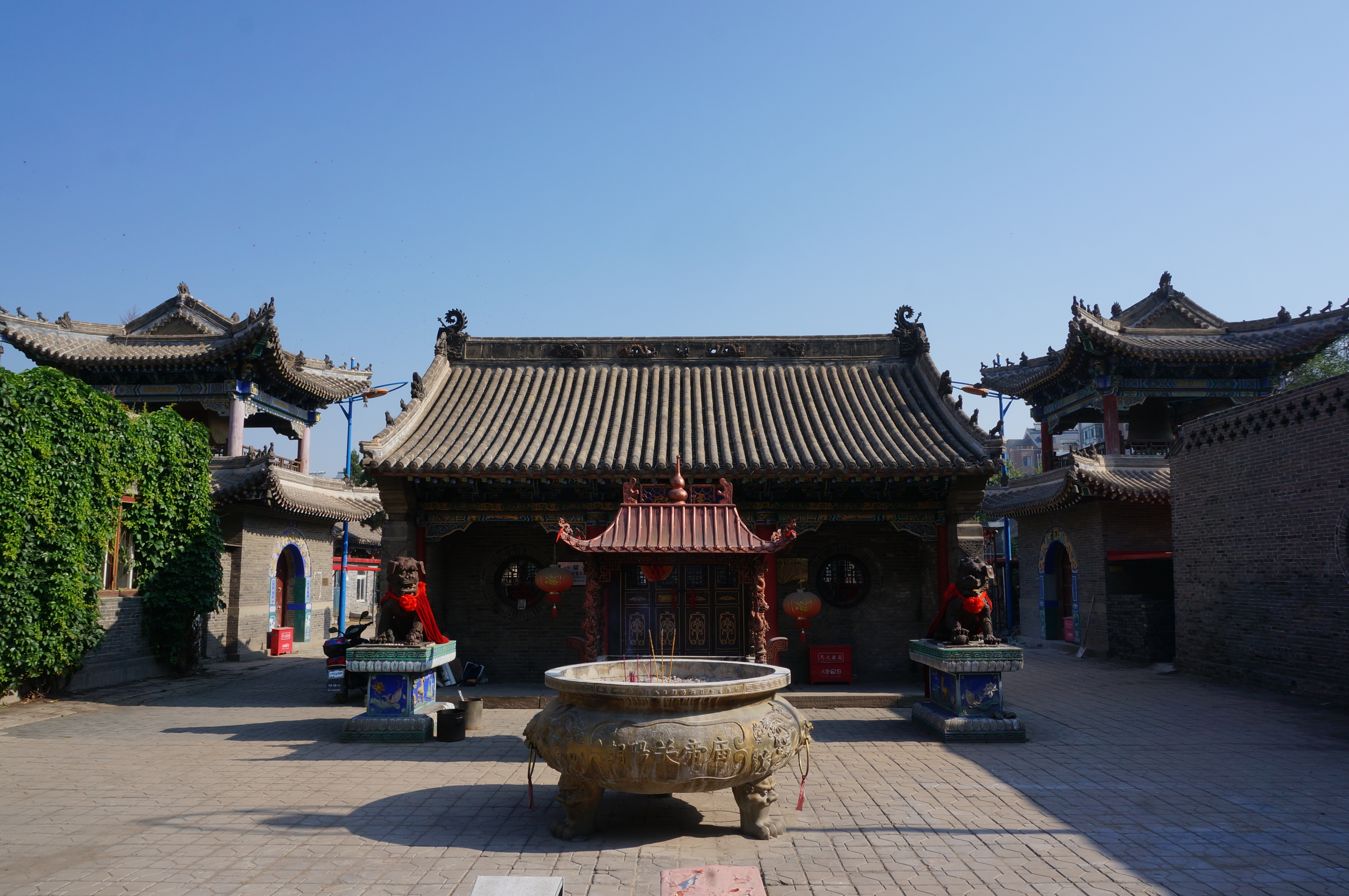
Temple of Guandi in Chaoyang, Liaoning.

The Chinese folk religion practiced by the Han Chinese who migrated in large numbers in the region by the Qing dynasty, mostly from Hebei and Shandong, has absorbed and developed models of deities and rituals from the indigenous religions of the Manchu and the other Tungusic peoples, making the folk religion of northeastern China different from the folk religion of central and southern provinces of China. Among these influences is the shamanic tradition of the region, known as chūmǎxiān (出马仙, "riding for the immortals"). Fox Gods, generally Great Lord of the Three Foxes (Húsān Tàiyé 胡三太爷) and Great Lady of the Three Foxes (Húsān Tàinǎi 胡三太奶), are the most revered deity in the region, with clear parallels in the Japanese cult of Inari Ōkami.

According to the 2007 Chinese Spiritual Life Survey, 7.73% of the population believes and is involved in the traditional Chinese religion of the lineage, that is the worship of the divine ancestors of a kinship (group of families sharing the same surname and descending from the same patriarchs) in networks of lineage churches and their ancestral shrines. Taoism and Confucianism have developed in the region since the 1980s.

=== Chinese folk religious sects and Confucian churches ===
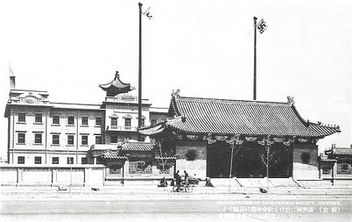
Guiyidao-Red Swastika's headquarters of Manchuria (before 1949).

Northeast China (Manchuria) has been a hotbed for salvationist sects of the folk religion mostly introduced from Shandong and Hebei. They developed greatly throughout the 20th century. The Yiguandao (一貫道 "Consistent Way") had a strong presence in the area, but were especially the Guiyidao (皈依道 "Way of the Return to the One") and the Universal Church of the Way and its Virtue (also called Shanrendao) to have millions of followers in northeastern China.

The Holy Church of the Confucian Way (儒门圣教 Rúmén Shèngjiào, also "Confucian Gate Shengism", 门 mén meaning figuratively a "way" as a "gate[way]") is a folk religious tradition widespread in modern-day Liaoning, with apparent links (at least by name) with the Ruzong Luandao ("Confucian Traditional Phoenix Way") and the Shengdao ("Holy Way") clusters of sects.

==== Falun Gong ====
Among folk religious sects, the Falun Gong was founded in the 1990s in Jilin by Li Hongzhi, and was widespread mostly in northeastern China at the time when it was outlawed by the central government.

==== Shanrendao ====
Coloured symbol of Shanrendao theory.

Shanrendao (善人道 "Way of the Virtuous Man"), is a Confucian religious movement founded in the 1920s by Jiang Shoufeng (1875-1926) and his son Jiang Xizhang (1907-2004), and led in the 1930s by the charismatic healer and preacher Wang Fengyi (王凤仪 1864–1937). Its names as a social body are the "Universal Church of the Way and its Virtue" (万国道德会 Wànguó Dàodéhuì) or the "Church of the Way and its Virtue" (道德会 Dàodéhuì), also simply "Morality Church". Its doctrine, based on a synthesis of traditional Chinese theology and cosmology, holds that spiritual healing can be achieved through traditional Confucian morality, rituals and good actions, and extinction of vices and selfishness.

In the 1930s, under Wang's leadership, the church gathered 8 million followers in Manchuria, that was 25% of the population. The Universal Church of the Way and its Virtue ceased to exist as a social organisation recognised by political authorities the People's Republic of China since the Communist Revolution of 1949 until recent decades. Shanrendao persisted as an "underground" movement across the Maoist period and the Cultural Revolution.

Since the relaxation of antireligion policies in the 1980s the movement has resurfaced and it has grown back especially in its heartland, northeast China (Manchuria), where the members preach filiality and Wang Fengyi's healing methods mostly organised in the form of house churches. Lineages of local healers are organised in "farms", and successfully employ storytelling, lectures on virtue, personal confessions, and a set of five chanted affirmations modeled on the five elements.

== Other Asian religions ==
=== Buddhism ===
The region is home to Chinese Buddhist schools and traditions and Tibetan Buddhist traditions, which are popular among Mongols as well as increasingly among Manchus and Han Chinese. The Jile Temple is an important Chinese Buddhist centre in Harbin.

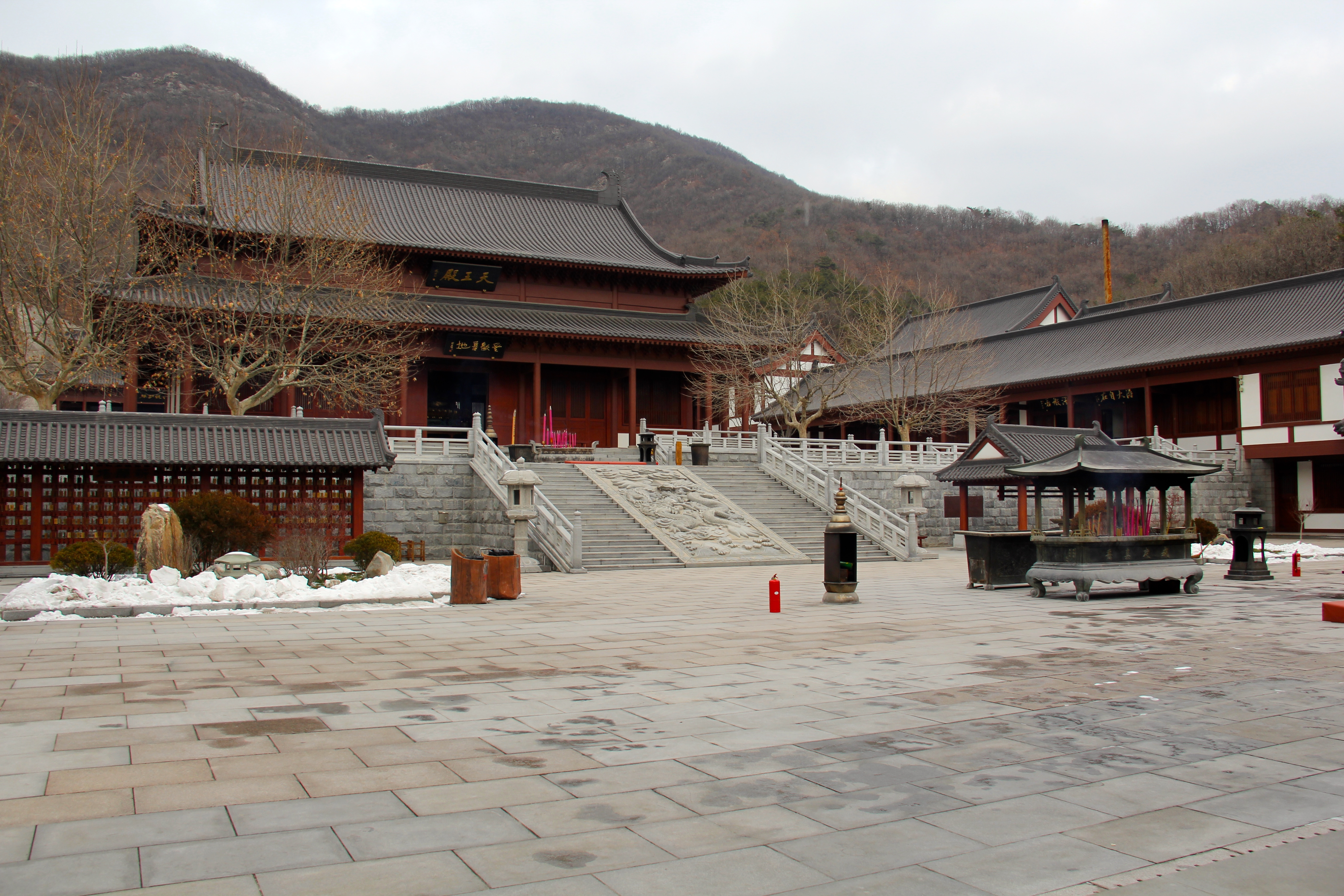
Hengshan Temple of Chinese Buddhism in Lushunkou, Dalian, Liaoning.

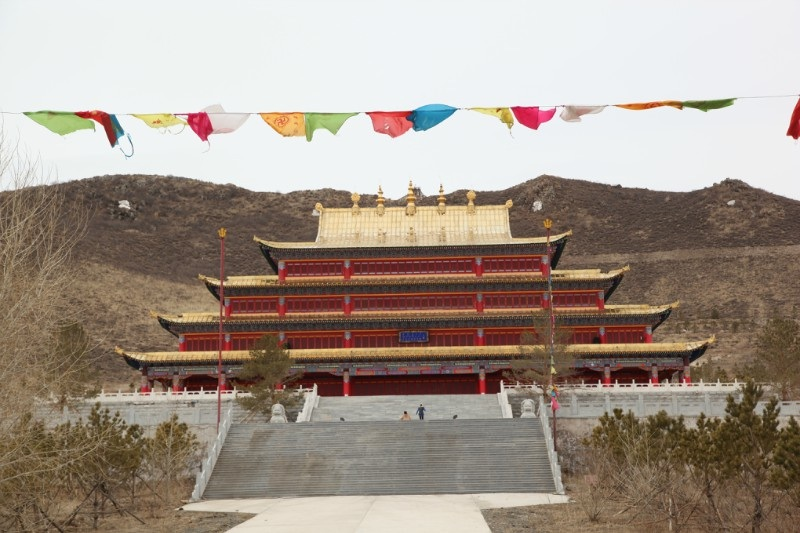
Taulayitu-gegen Temple of Tibetan Buddhism on the boundary between Jilin and Inner Mongolia.

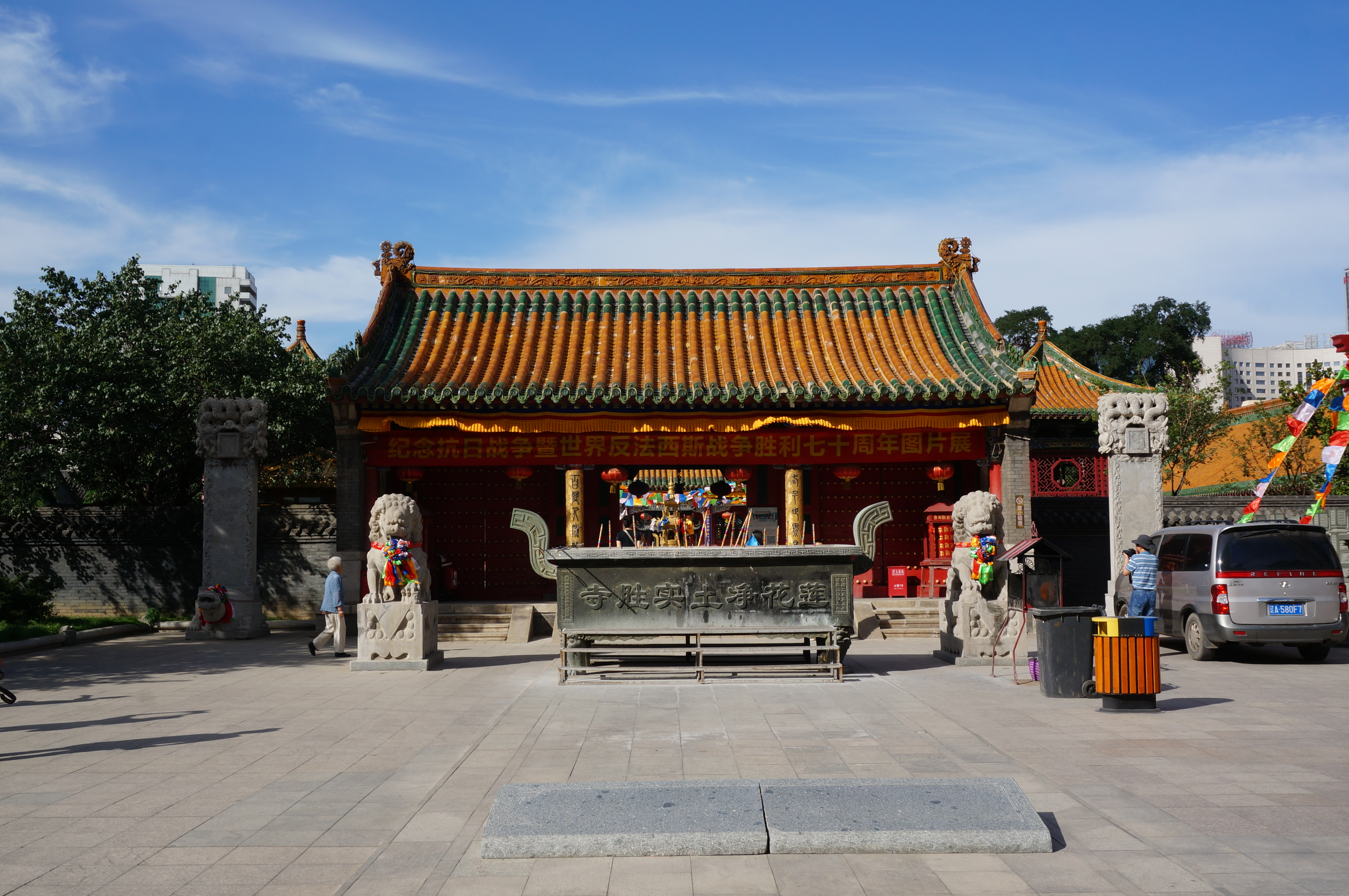
Shisheng Temple of Chinese Buddhism in Shenyang, Liaoning.

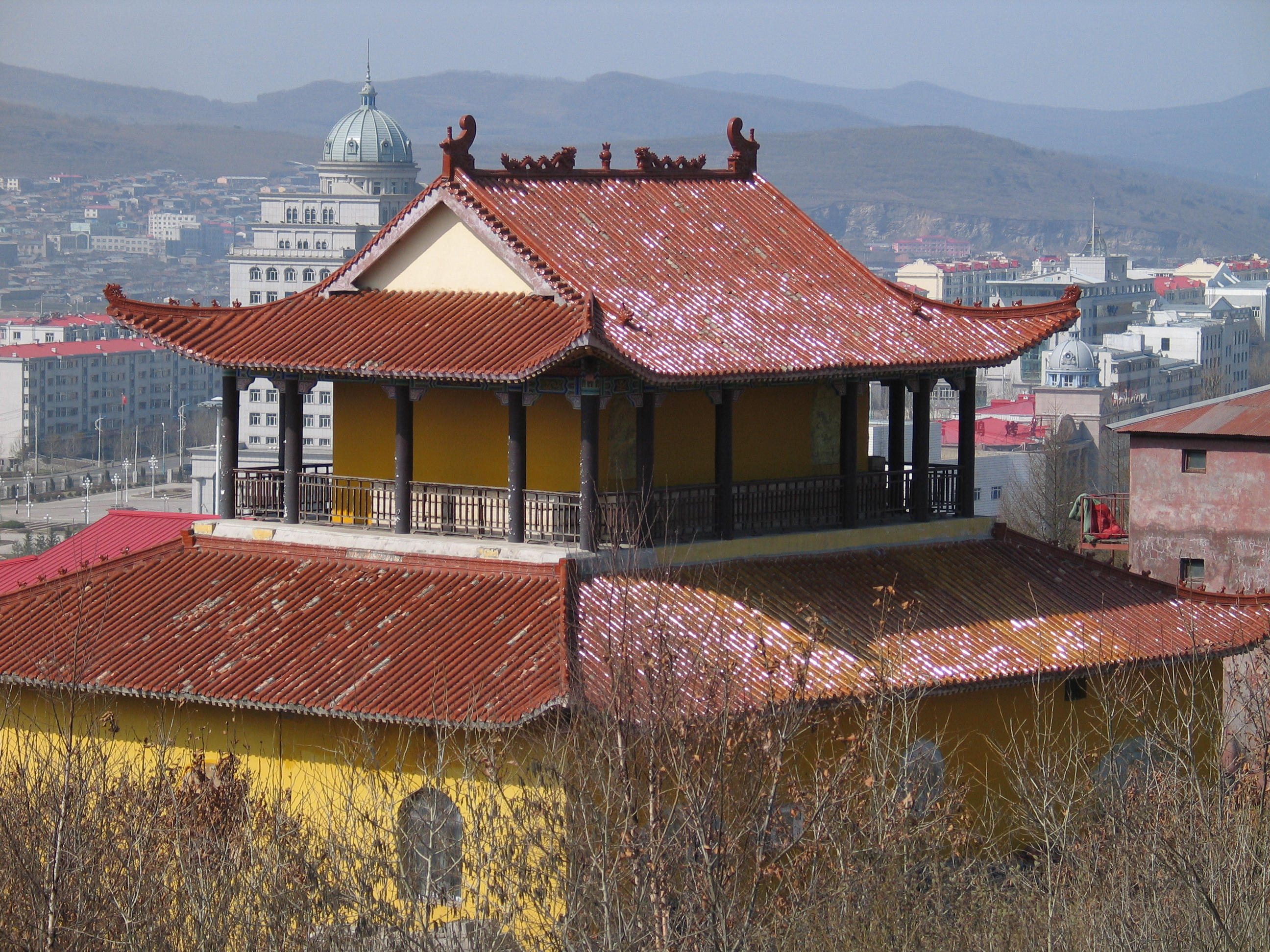
Guanmin Temple of Chinese Buddhism in Suifenhe, Heilongjiang.

=== Shinto ===
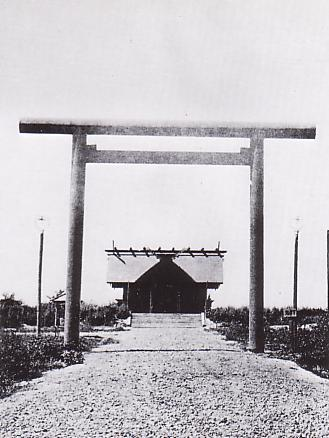
Japanese Shinto shrine of Qiqihar, Heilongjiang (photo taken prior to 1945).

During the period of the Japanese occupation (1931) and the Manchukuo (1932–1945) the Japanese conducted scholarly research on the local folk religion and established Shinto shrines, although without trying to impose Shinto on the native populations as it was the case in occupied Korea and occupied Taiwan, as the Manchurian State was conceived as a spiritually autonomous nation.

Many Japanese new religions, or independent Shinto sects, proselytised in Manchuria establishing hundreds of congregations. Most of the missions belonged to the Omoto teaching, the Tenri teaching and the Konko teaching of Shinto. The Omoto teaching is the Japanese near equivalent of Guiyidao, as the two religions have common roots and history.

== Abrahamic religions ==
=== Christianity ===
According to the Chinese General Social Survey of 2009, Christianity is the religion of 2.15% of the population of the region. Many Christians are reportedly Koreans. Christianity has a strong presence in the Yanbian Korean Autonomous Prefecture, in Jilin. The Christianity of Yanbian Koreans has a patriarchal character; Korean churches are usually led by men, in contrast to Chinese churches which more often have female leadership. For instance, of the 28 registered churches of Yanji, only three of which are Chinese congregations, all the Korean churches have a male pastor while all the Chinese churches have a female pastor.

Moreover, Korean church buildings are stylistically very similar to South Korean churches, with big spires surmounted by large red crosses. Yanbian Korean churches have been a matter of controversy for the Chinese government because of their links to South Korean churches.

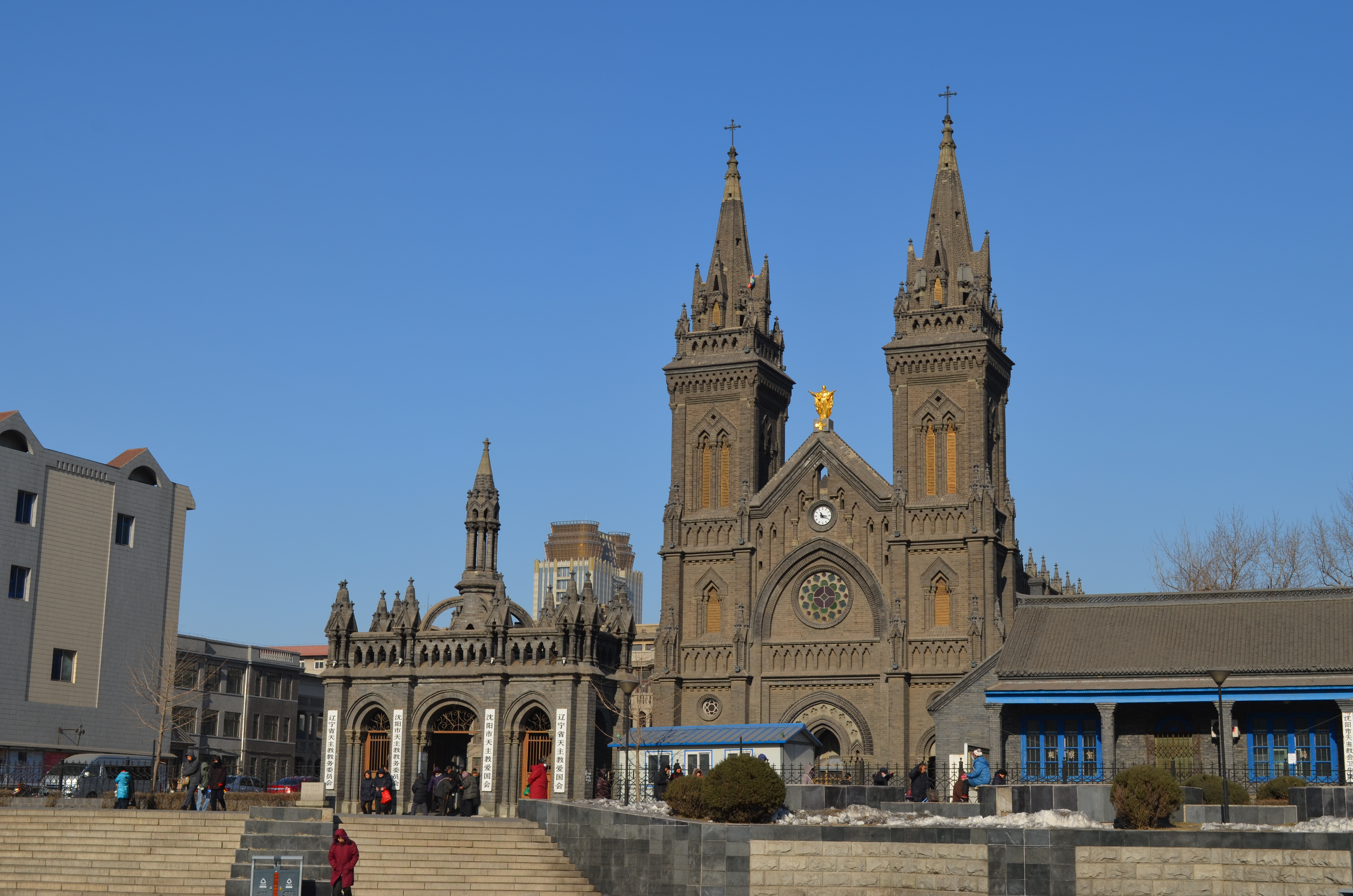
Sacred Heart Cathedral of the Catholic Church in Shenyang, Liaoning.

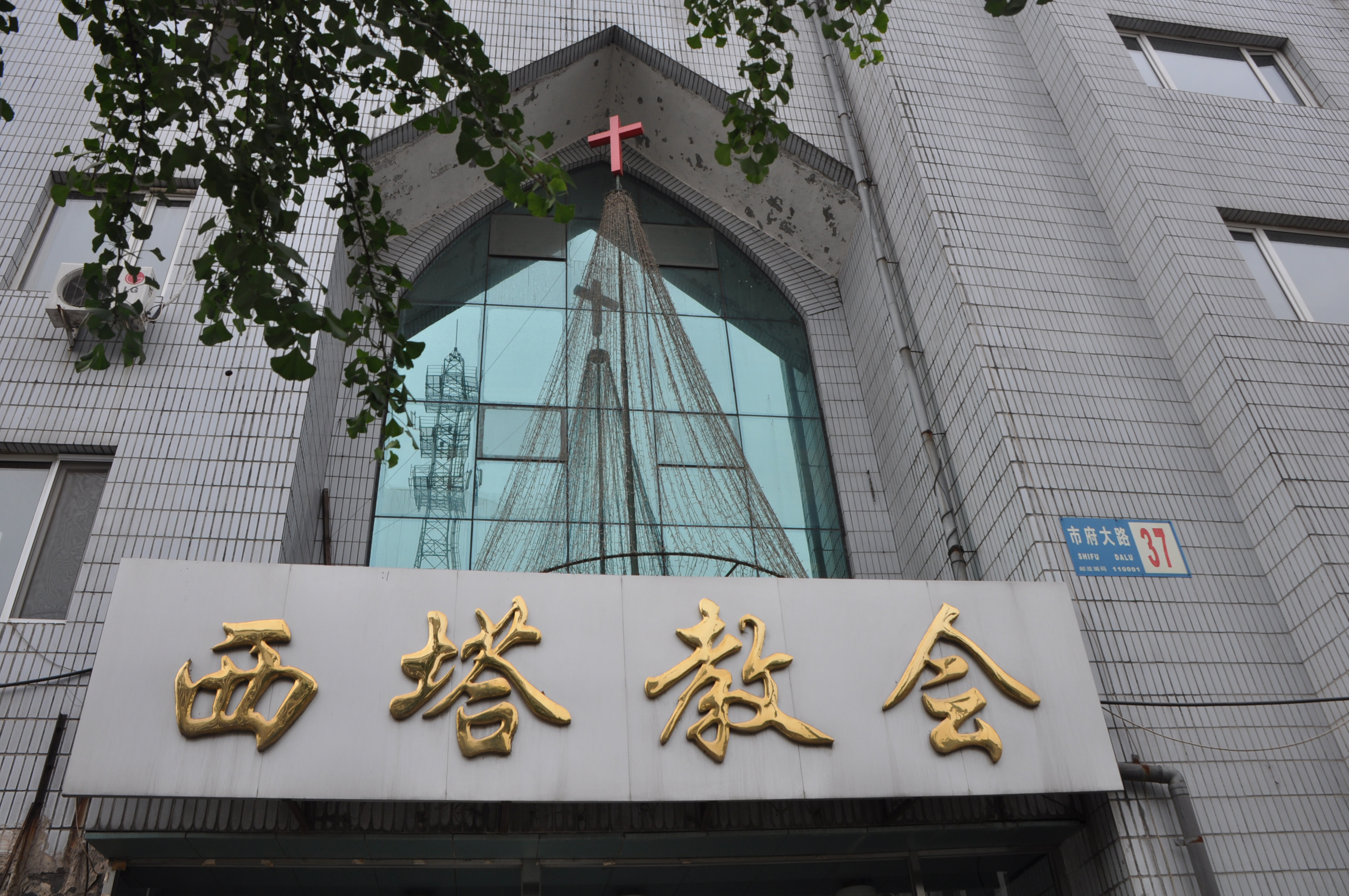
The Xita Church of Korean Protestants in Xita, Shenyang.

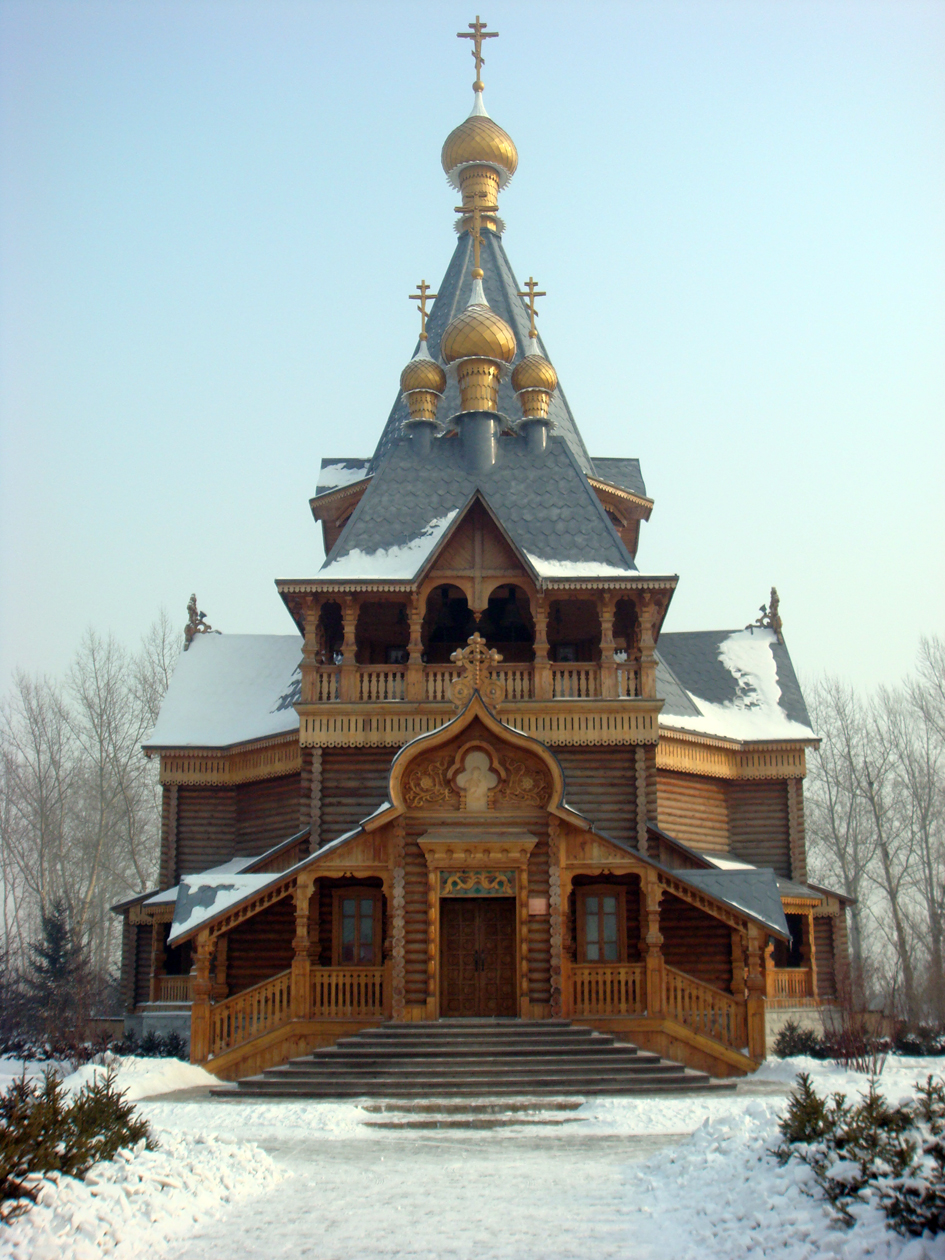
A Russian Orthodox church in Xiangfang, Harbin, Heilongjiang.

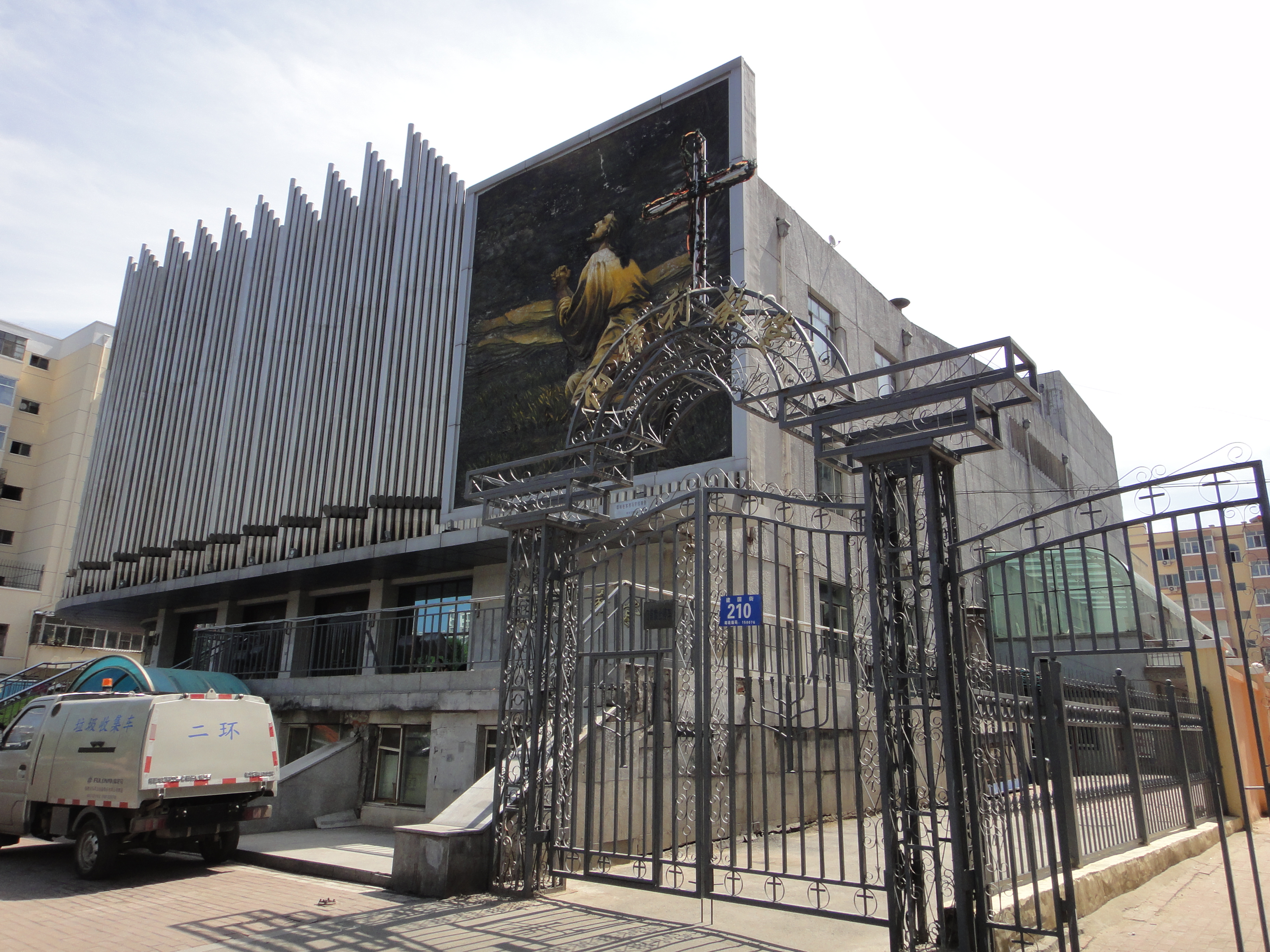
Bethel Protestant Church in Harbin.

=== Islam ===
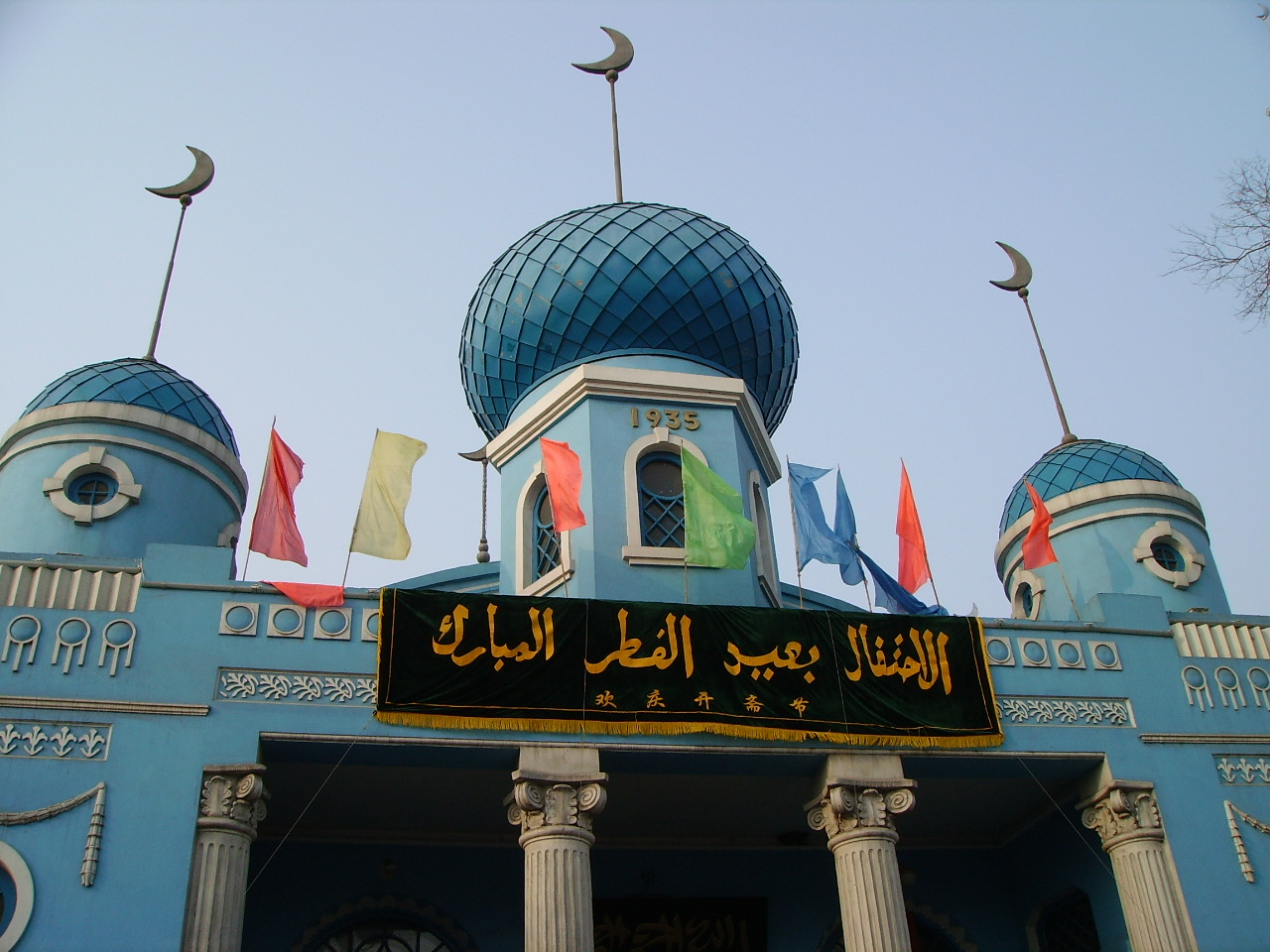
The Daowai Mosque in Harbin.

Northeast China is home to a small number of Hui Chinese who traditionally follow Islam. As of 2010 there are 52,100 Muslims in the region, equal to 0.04% of the total population.

== See also ==
- Heterodox teachings (Chinese law)
- Religion in China
- Religion in Inner Mongolia
- Religion in Japan
- Religion in Korea
