= Northeast China folk religion =

Variety of Chinese folk religion practiced in Northeastern China

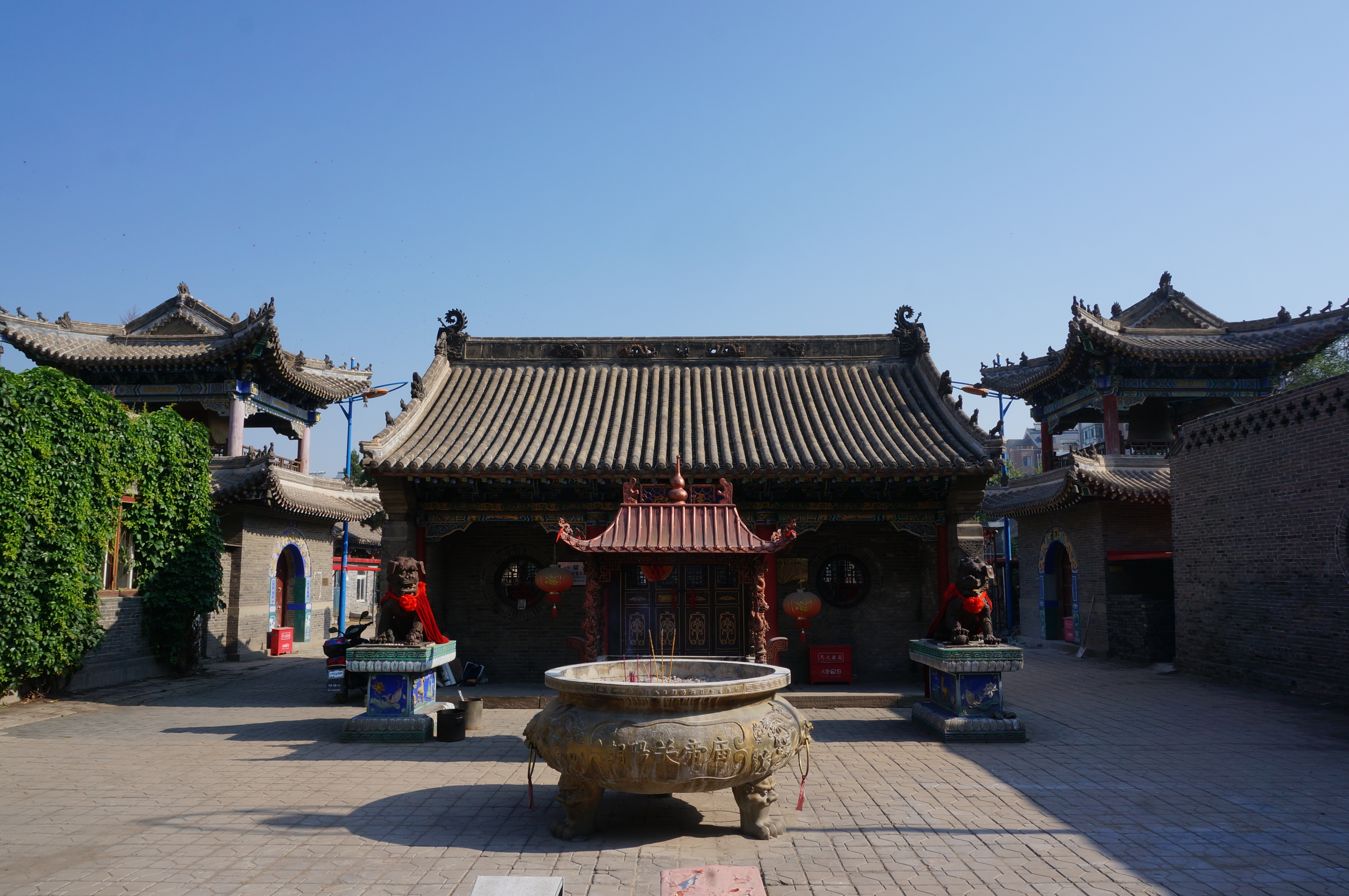
Temple of Guandi in Chaoyang, Liaoning. The martial character of Guandi makes him appealing not only for Han Chinese but also for Manchus.

Northeast China folk religion (Note: The general description in Chinese language is 東北民間宗教 Dōngběi mínjiān zōngjiào or 東北民間信仰 Dōngběi mínjiān xìnyǎng.) is the variety of Chinese folk religion of northeast China, characterised by distinctive cults original to Hebei and Shandong, transplanted and adapted by the Han Chinese settlers of Liaoning, Jilin and Heilongjiang (the three provinces comprising Northeast China) since the Qing dynasty. It is characterised by terminology, deities and practices that are different from those of central and southern Chinese folk religion. Many of these patterns derive from the interaction of Han religion with Manchu shamanism.

Prominence is given to the worship of zoomorphic deities, of a "totemic" significance. In the region the terms shen 神 ("god") and xian 仙 ("immortal being") are synonymous. Figures of ritual specialists or shamans (Note: Shamans are variously called: Simply dìzǐ 弟子, "disciples (of the gods)"; Dàxiān er 大仙兒, "children of the great gods"; Tiào dàshén 跳大神, "dancers of the great gods".) perform various ritual functions for groups of believers and local communities, including chūmǎxiān (出馬仙 "riding for the immortals"), dances, healing, exorcism, divination, and communication with ancestors.

== History ==
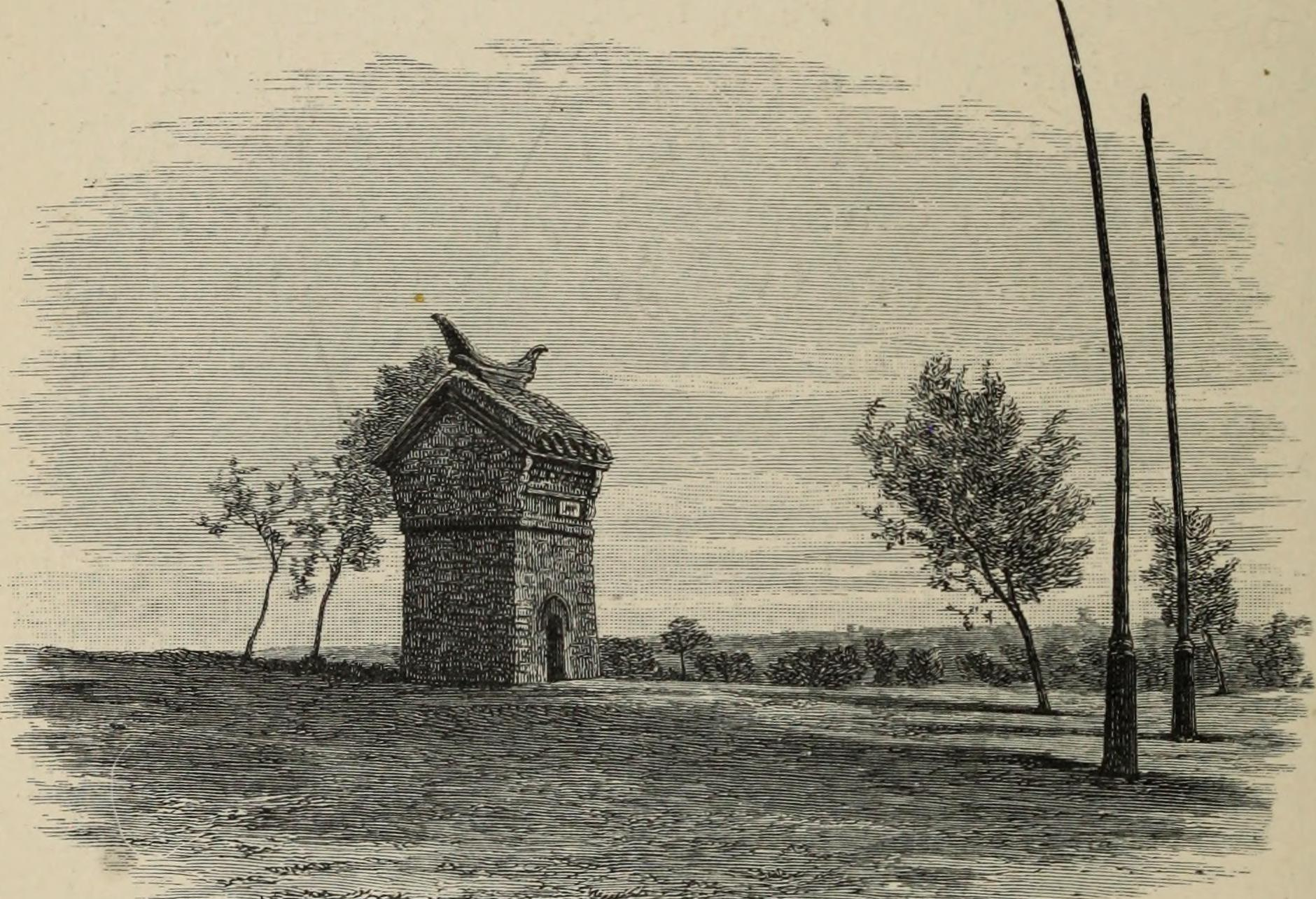
A roadside shrine in Manchuria (1888)

The formation of northeast China's folk religion and shamanism can be traced back to the Qing dynasty (1644–1911), when a large number of Han Chinese settled in the northeast of China mixing with Manchus. Either in the Qing period, and in the later Republic of China (1912–1949) and subsequent People's Republic, the worship of zoomorphic deities and the practice of chumaxian had bad relationship with the governments, which considered it "feudal superstition" (封建迷信 fēngjiàn míxìn) and banned through different decrees.

The popular worship of animal gods began to resurface in the 1980s, and soon also the chumaxian practice was revived. In the 2010s there have been attempts to protect chumaxian under the policy of "intangible cultural heritage".

=== Japanese scholarship and Shinto similarities ===
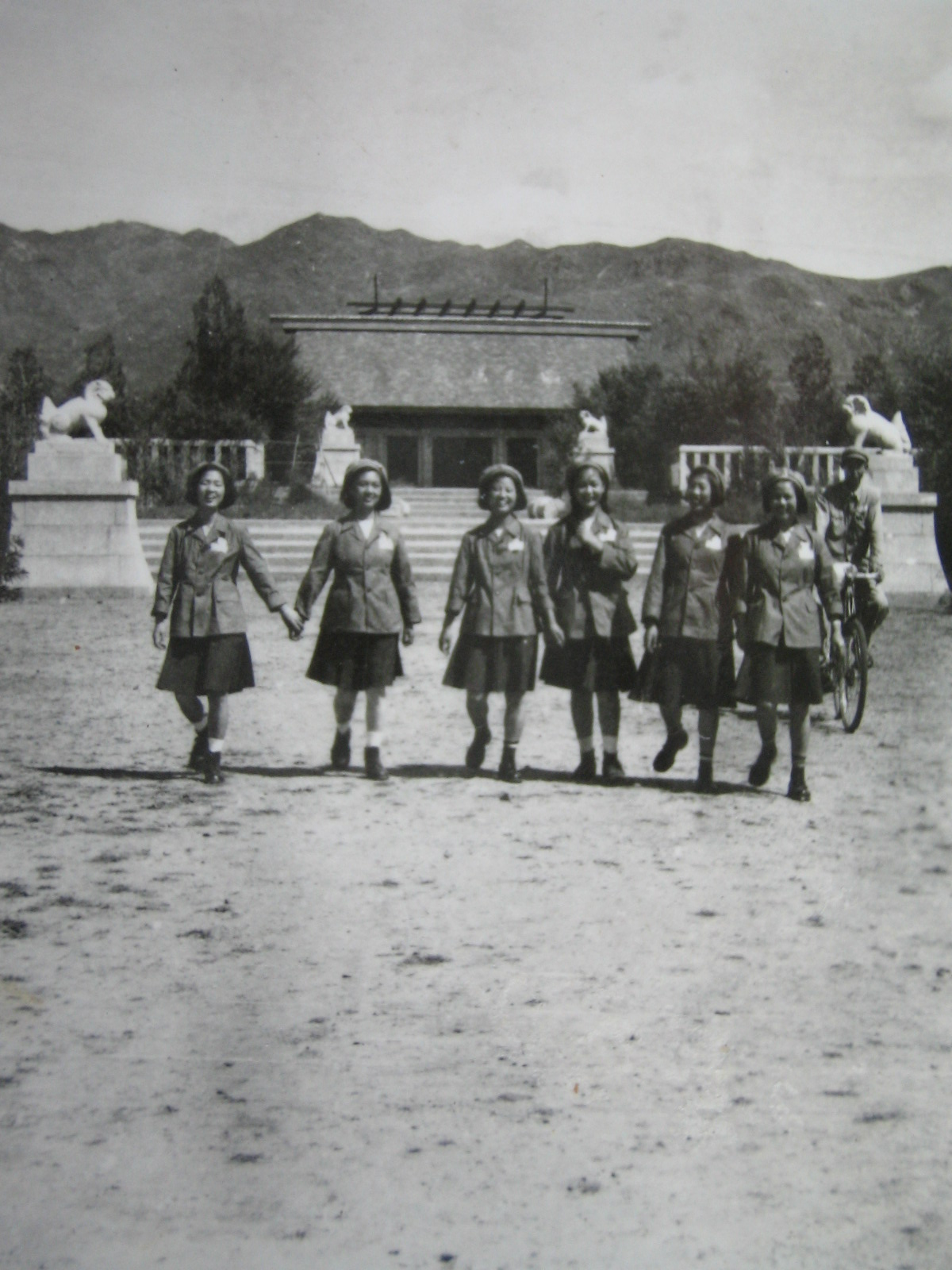
Shinto shrine in Zhangjiakou, Hebei, China, in the 1950s, when it was already abandoned. The shrine was founded by the Japanese during World War II, and incorporated Mongol Genghis Khan worship.

The study of northeast China's folk religion owes much to the scholarly enterprise that the Japanese conducted on the subject during the period of Manchukuo (1932–1945) that they established after they occupied Manchuria. Unlike Japanese-occupied Korea and occupied Taiwan, Manchuria was conceived as an autonomous nation, not to be assimilated into Japan, but rather to be modeled after the latter's social and religious structure keeping an independent identity.

Ōmachi Tokuzo (1909–1970), a pupil of Yanagita Kunio (the founder of academic ethnography in Japan), conducted field research on local religion in Manchuria through the war years. He later acted as the head of the Society for the Study of Manchurian Customs, producing an impressive body of research on local religion in Manchuria and north China. Ōmachi identified the rural village, each with a Tudishen shrine, as the fundamental unit of northeast China's local religion and of the religious character of the Han Chinese race. He also studies local Chinese goddess worship and the great similarity and integration of the Han and the Manchus. Ōmachi does not appear to have supported the institution of Shinto shrines in Manchurian villages, which in Korea and Taiwan were intended for the spiritual transformation of the locals into Japanese citizens by their integration into Shinto communities.

Another scholar, Tokunaga Takeshi, sought to demonstrate the spiritual unity of Japan, Manchuria and China by highlighting the similarities between ancient religious structures of the three nations:

Japanese ancient shrines are of the kannabi (popularly known as Mt. Fuji-style) shape. There are many of these in Manchuria, as well ... [The artifacts] develop from the same agrarian culture and philosophy as Japanese Shinto (kannagara no michi) ... Modern [Chinese] matron temples have these elements, as well. Therefore, since the temples were built later, it is thought that matron worship was grafted onto this earlier pattern of belief.

Other scholars studied the similarities between local and Japanese shamanisms. The Manchukuo generally promoted a racially centered spiritual revival, that is an ethnic religion for each of the races inhabiting Manchuria. For example, under the suggestions of Ogasawara Shozo that the Mongols "need(ed) a new religion, specifically a new god" they promoted the worship of Genghis Khan that continues today in northern China. The Shinto shrine of Kalgan (now Zhangjiakou, Hebei) incorporated Genghis Khan worship and was opened to local Mongols.

== Characteristics ==
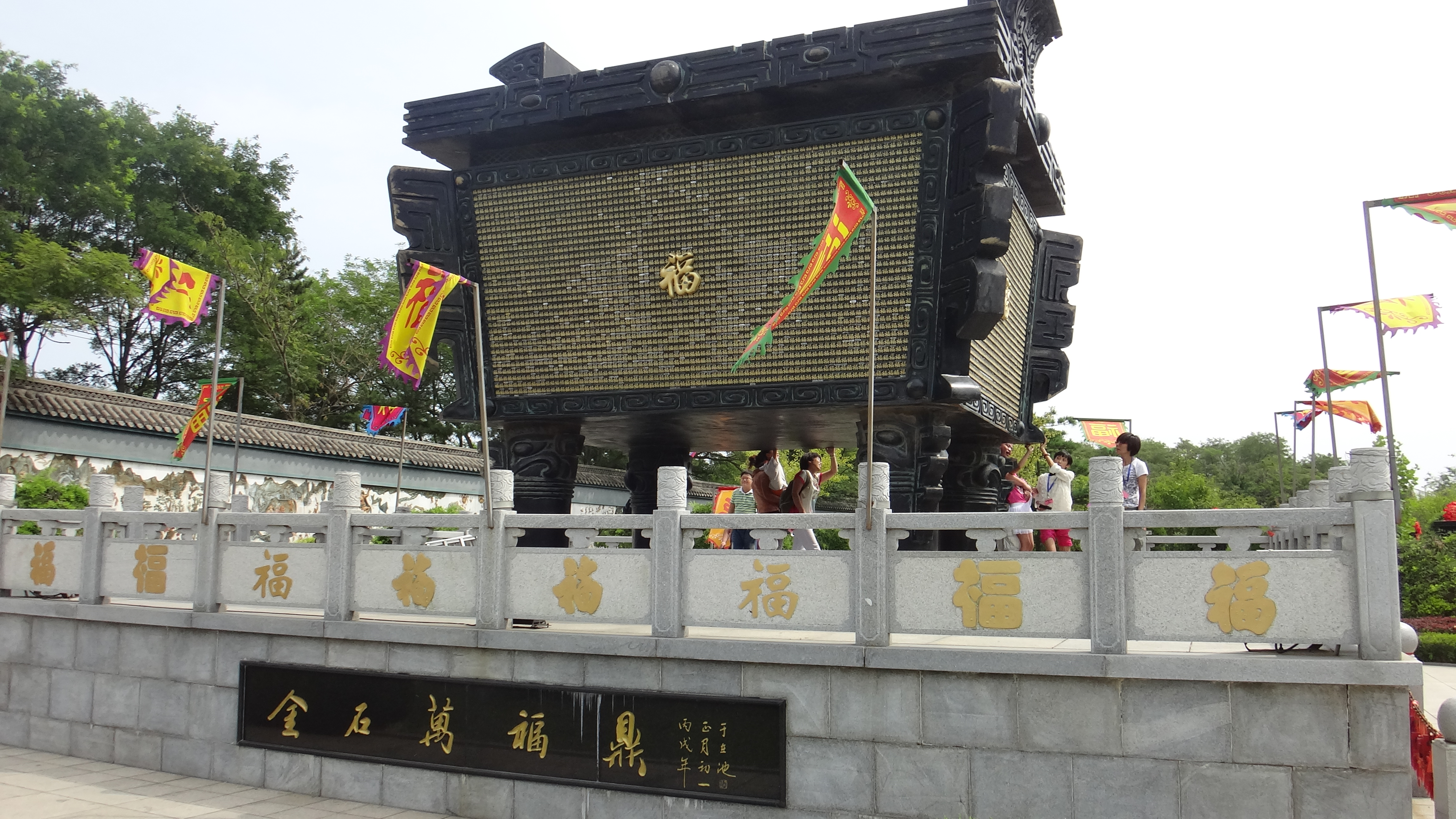
"Myriad Prosperities' Cauldron" (万福鼎 Wànfú Dǐng), with the name of the "Prosperity God" or "Fortune God" (福星 Fúxīng) inscribed ten thousand times, in Jinzhou, Dalian, Liaoning

=== Deities ===
Besides common Chinese deities such as Guāndì (关帝 "Lord Guan", the Marshal God of Loyalty & Justice), people of north China and Manchuria also have distinctive zoomorphic deities, and the worship of clusters of goddesses is popular. The gods are ordained in hierarchies, a pattern inherited from the Chinese Confucian lineage system. Fox deities have a very important position, with evident parallels in the Japanese cult of Inari Ōkami. Usually at the head of the pantheon are placed the "Great Lord of the Three Foxes" (胡三太爷 Húsān Tàiyé) and the "Great Lady of the Three Foxes" (胡三太奶 Húsān Tàinǎi).

The Five Great Immortals (五大仙 Wǔdàxiān) are deities who reproduce cosmological structures of common Chinese theology. The cult generally includes: 1) Húxiān (狐仙;胡仙 "Fox Immortal") or Húshén (狐神 "Fox God"), the most important deity in northeast China; 2) Huángxiān (黃仙 literally "Yellow Immortal") the Weasel God, who holds the position of the Yellow Deity of Chinese theology; 3) Shéxiān (蛇仙 literally "Snake Immortal"), also called Liǔxiān (柳仙 "Immortal Liu") or Mǎngxiān (蟒仙 "Python (or Boa) Immortal"), who can represent the Dragon God, Fuxi and Nüwa; 4) Báixiān (白仙 "White Immortal") is the Hedgehog God; and 5) Hēixiān (黑仙 "Black Immortal") who can be the Wūyāxiān (乌鸦仙 "Crow Immortal") or the Huīxiān (灰仙 "Rat Immortal").

While the Fox God and the Weasel God always remain the two prominent members of the cult of the zoomorphic deities, the other positions vary in some regions including the Tiger, the Wolf, the Hare and the Turtle Gods. Other areas host the worship of the Leopard, the Mole, the Toad and the Rabbit Gods. In certain counties of Hebei they are reduced to four (四大仙 Sìdàxiān) including the Fox, the Weasel, the Hedgehog and the Snake Gods.

Common Chinese deities are associated to the cult of the zoomorphic gods. For instance, Huáng Dàxiān (黄大仙 "Great Yellow Immortal") is popular in north and northeast China, he is totally different from Wong Tai Sin and has no relation to Taoism as in southeastern China, the deity is rather identified as the Weasel God.

Local terminology distinguishes the animal gods as the middle way between the shàngfáng shénxiān (上房神仙 "everlasting gods") gods of the greater cosmos important in Taoism, that are only worshipped and do not take possession of shamans; and the yīnxiān (陰仙 "underworld gods"), deceased beings who became gods through self-cultivation (ancestors and progenitors). In northeastern Taoism, besides the Fox Gods, the pantheon is headed by a goddess, the "Black Mother" (黑媽媽 Hēi māmā).

=== Shamanism ===
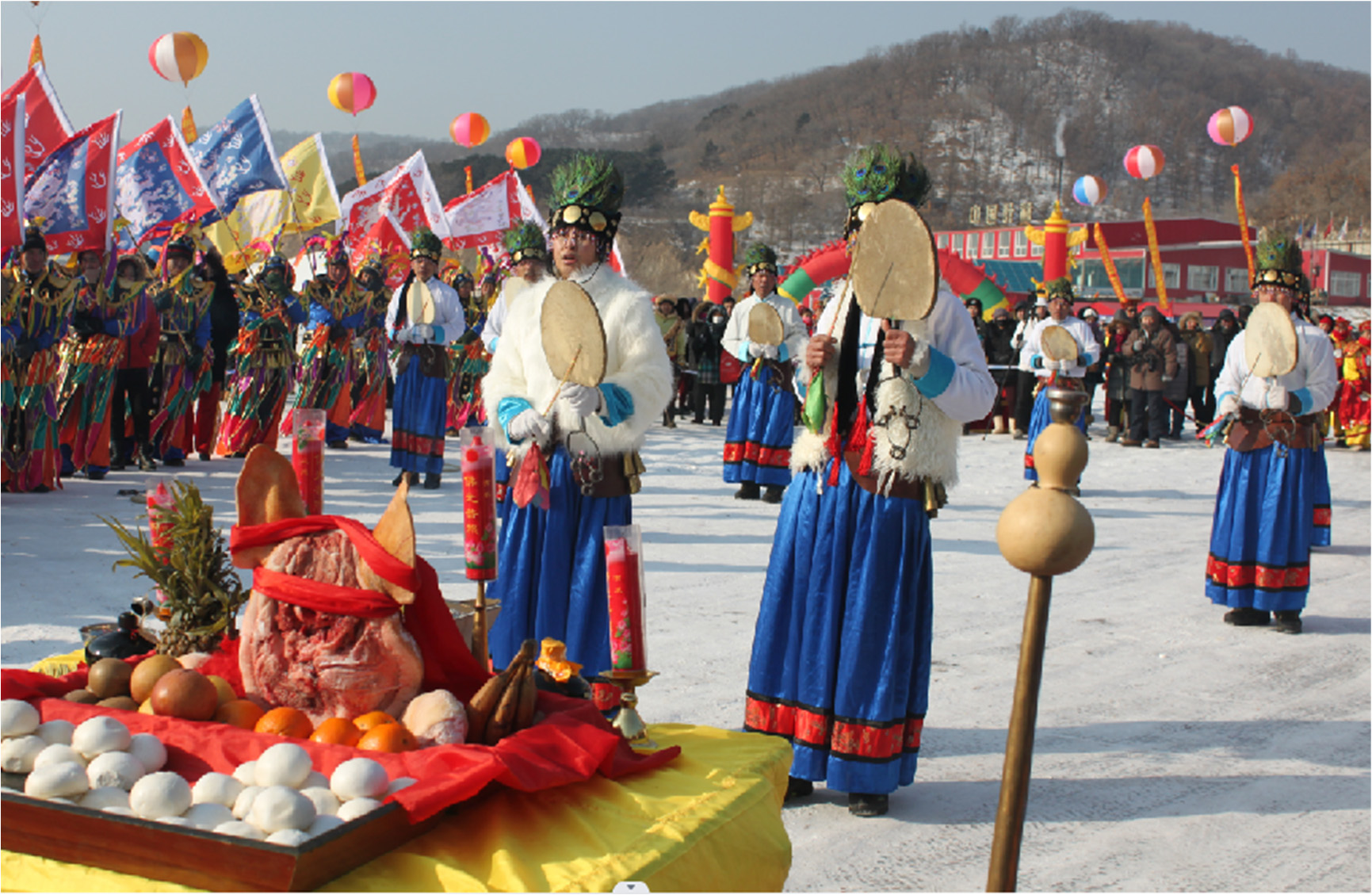
Incense squad holds Qixiang sacrificial rite to worship the gods, 2016

Qixiang (旗香), which combines a variety of cultural elements including shamanism, Han people burning incense and military sacrificial rites, is a sacrificial culture in Northeast China created by the Han bannermen. Northeastern shamans consider themselves to be "disciples" (dìzǐ 弟子) of the gods rather than mere channels of communication between the gods and the human world. Another name used to refer to these ritual masters is xiāngtóu (香頭 "incense heads"). Their practice is generally called chumaxian (出马仙), which means "the gods who take action" or more literally "riding for the immortals", a definition which implies that the gods and their disciples act as an organic whole, and in their action, form and content they express themselves together.

There are two types of possession that the northeastern shamans experience in terms of consciousness: quánméng (全蒙 "complete unconsciousness", in which the disciple is not aware of what happens and what the god says) and bànméng (半蒙 "semi-unconsciousness", in which the disciple is aware of what happens during the possession).

They also practise a communication with ancestors through an ecstatic experience called guòyīn (过阴 "passing to the underworld"). This is part of the practices of both chumaxian and related communal rites of broader Chinese local religion.

Northeastern Chinese shamanism shares similarities with Southern Chinese mediumship (jitong), Japanese Shinto practices, and various other shamanisms in the region (Tungus and Manchu shamanism, Mongolian shamanism, Korean shamanism, broader Siberian shamanism). Historically it is the result of the encounter of Han Chinese and Manchu cultures, especially the Han cult of the fox and Manchu "wild ritual" (wuwate, Chinese: yějì 野祭).

Northeastern Chinese shamans are predominantly women, like the shamans of Northeast Asian shamanism, while Southern Chinese mediums are almost exclusively men. Moreover, while northeastern shamans are usually independent from formal religious institutions, southern medium specialists often collaborate with Taoist priests. Another distinction is that while Southern Chinese mediums can acquire their role through training, and they are possessed mainly by Taoist and strictly Chinese Deities, northeastern shamans are "chosen" or "ordained" by gods themselves (through mo, "sickness") as in other shamanic traditions, and their gods are animal totems. When a future disciple is chosen, she experiences mo ("sickness").

=== Places of worship and shaman halls ===
In northeast China terminology for religious places and groups may follow the common Chinese model, with miao (庙) defining any "sacred precinct" dedicated to a god. However, a different terminology exists and temples may be called xiāntáng (仙堂 "hall of the immortals") or tángzi (堂子), the latter name inherited from the temples of the bolongzi (Chinese: jiājì 家祭, "ancestral ritual") of Manchu shamanism. Shamans also hold "immediate halls" of worship (lìtáng 立堂) in their houses.

=== Folk religious sects ===
Coloured symbol of Shanrendao theory

Since Chinese Buddhism and professional Taoism were never well developed in northeast China, the religious life of the region has been heavily influenced by networks of folk salvationist sects and Confucian churches, characterised by a congregational structure and a scriptural core. During the Japanese occupation they were not studied, but their role as a moral catalyser for the Han race was emphasised.

The Yiguandao (一貫道 "Consistent Way") had a strong presence in the area, but were especially the Guiyidao (皈依道 "Way of the Return to the One") and the Shanrendao (善人道 "Way of the Virtuous Man", which social body was known as the Universal Church of the Way and its Virtue) to have millions of followers in Manchuria alone. Shanrendao remains widespread even after the Maoist period and the Cultural Revolution, and headquarters of the Church of the Way and its Virtue have been re-established in Beijing in the 2010s. In more recent decades northeast China has also seen the rise of the Falun Gong, which was founded in the 1990s in Jilin.

During the period of Manchukuo also many Japanese new religions, or independent Shinto sects, proselytised in Manchuria establishing hundreds of congregations. Most of the missions belonged to the Omoto teaching, the Tenri teaching and the Konko teaching of Shinto. The Omoto teaching is the Japanese near equivalent of Guiyidao, as the two religions have common roots and history.

== See also ==
- Chinese ancestral worship
- Chinese Buddhism
- Chinese folk religion
- Chinese salvationist religions
- Manchu shamanism
- Chinese spiritual world concepts
- Shen (Chinese religion)
- Shinto
- Taoism
