= Xita =

Koreatown in Shenyang, China

Coordinates: 41.8047°N 123.4086°E

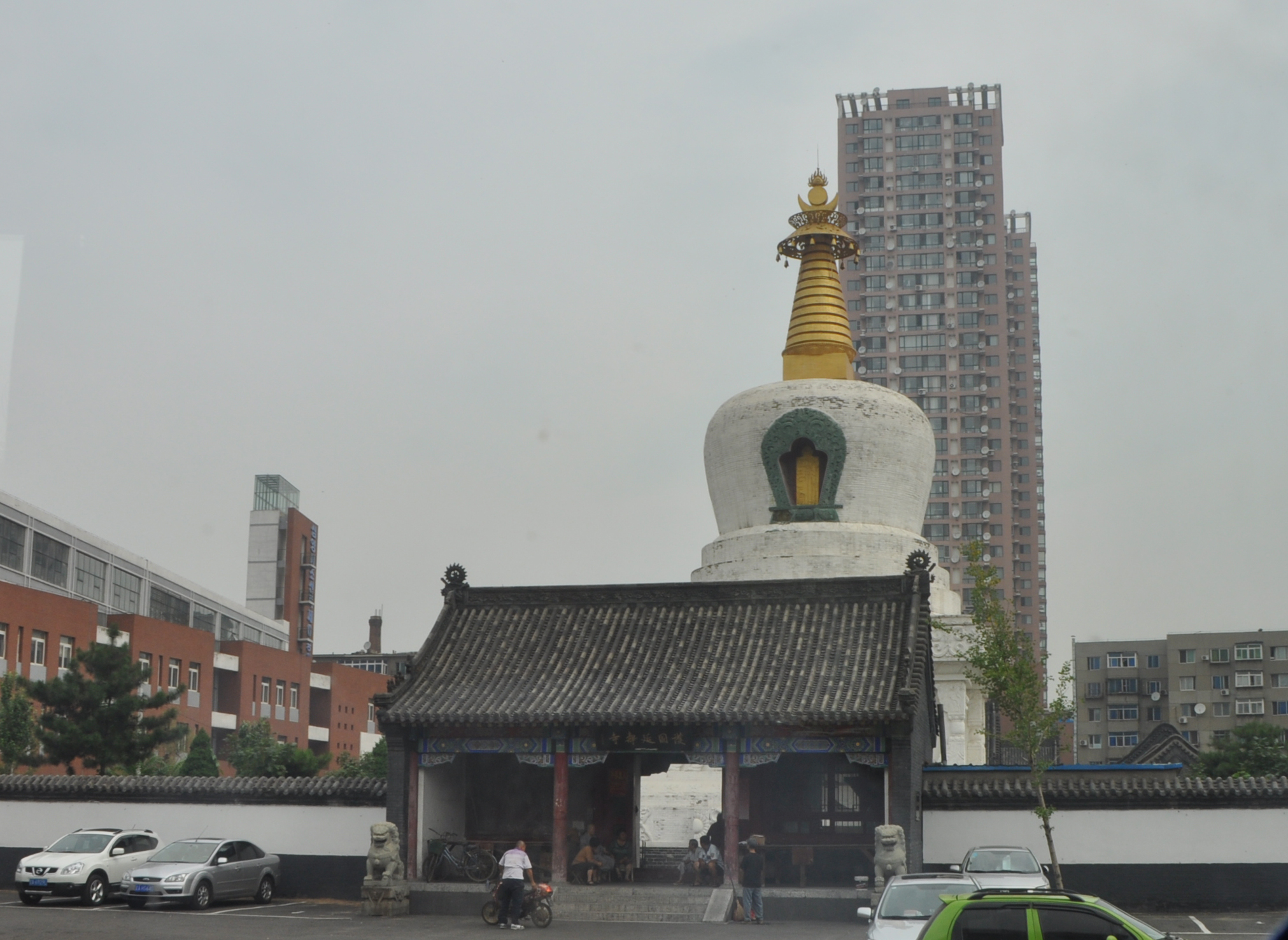
Xita (Western Pagoda) in Shenyang, China

Xita (Chinese: 西塔; pinyin: Xī Tǎ; Korean: 서탑) is a neighborhood in Shenyang, China.

The name "Xita" (literally: Western pagoda) came from a pagoda accompanying the Tibetan Buddhist Yanshou Temple (延寿寺). The temple was built in 1640—1645, as one of the "Four Pagodas of Early Qing" (Chinese: 清初四塔; pinyin: Qīngchū Sì Tǎ). The pagoda later fell into disrepair and was demolished in 1968 during the Cultural Revolution, but was rebuilt in 1998.

Xita neighborhood is the largest Koreatown in Northeast China. In 2012, Xita had 8,338 native ethnic Korean citizens. In addition, over 20,000 Koreans from other parts of China as well as 5,000 South Koreans resided there. The area contains a Russian Orthodox church and a Protestant church (Xita Church), both built in the early 20th century. The Korean shopping mall of Xita, located in a century-old commercial street, used to play a vital role in introducing international fashion styles to Shenyang.

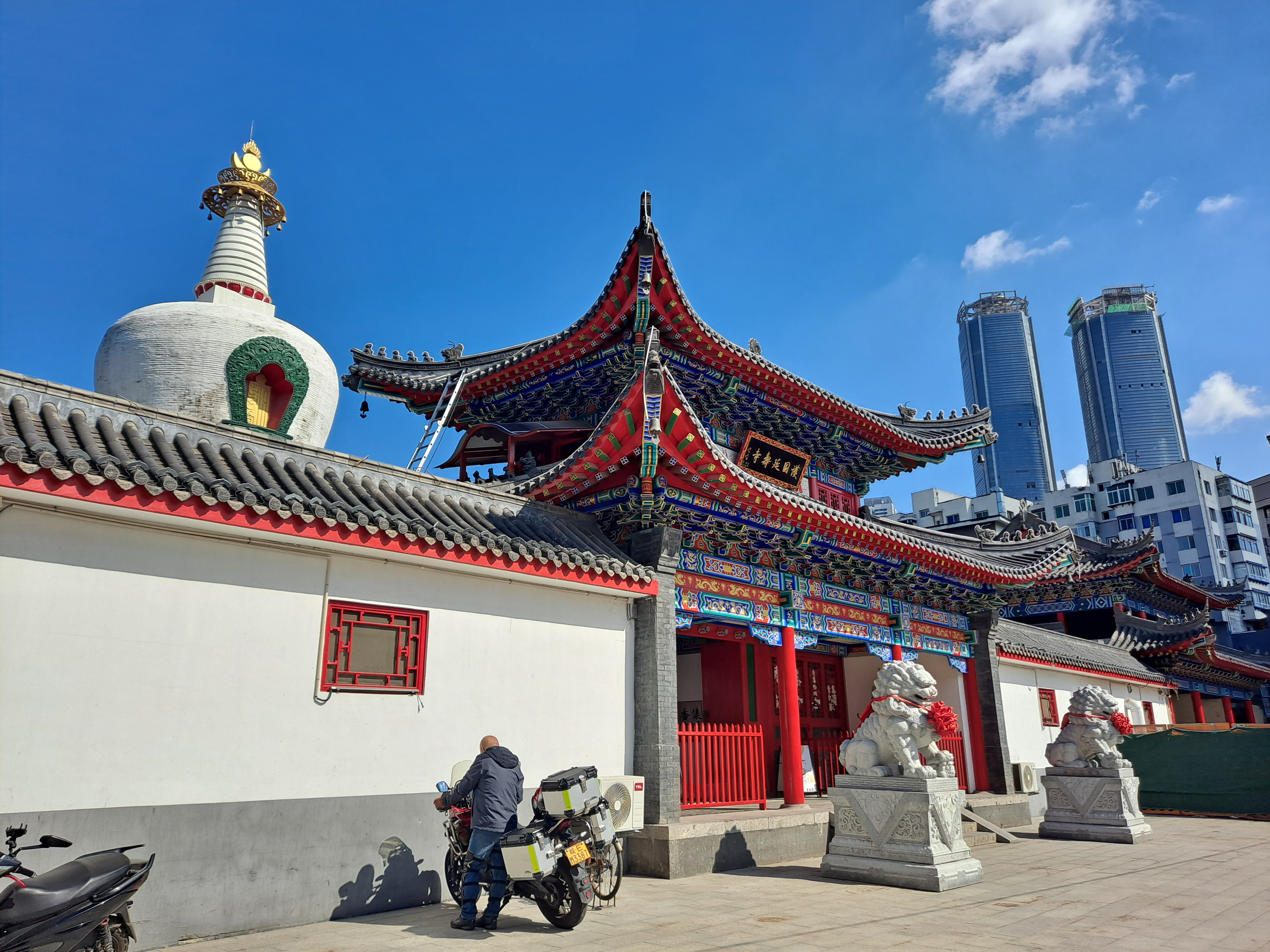
Xita Temple, Shenyang in 2024

== See also ==
- Xita Church
