= Huxian =

Chinese deity

Húxiān (simplified Chinese: 胡仙; traditional Chinese: 狐仙; trans. "Fox Immortal"), also called Húshén (胡神; 狐神; "Fox God") or Húwáng (胡王; 狐王; "Fox Ruler") is a deity in Chinese religion whose cult is present in provinces of north China (from Henan and Shandong northwards), but especially in northeast China where it can be said to be the most popular deity.

The deity can be represented as either male or female, but is most frequently identified as the female Húxiān Niángniáng (狐仙娘娘; "Fox Immortal Lady") whose animal form is a nine-tailed fox.

Mythology tells that fox spirits are masters of the arts of metamorphosis, and can manifest in human form to seduce men or women. In exchange, they convey wealth and property. In mystical literature, influenced by Taoism, fox spirits are immortal or transcendent beings of a high level in the spiritual hierarchy of beings who engage in the pursuit of becoming immortals.

The fox deity is also represented as a couple of gods, male and female, called the Great Lord of the Three Foxes (胡三太爷; Húsān Tàiyé) and the Great Lady of the Three Foxes (胡三太奶; Húsān Tàinǎi). As a goddess, the Fox Immortal is related to Xīwángmǔ (西王母; "Queen Mother of the West"), the great goddess guardian of Mount Kunlun (axis mundi).

== Prevalence of the sect in northeast China ==
Nagao Ryuzō, a Japanese sinologist, observed that the Fox Gods "enjoy such popularity to be worshipped by almost every household in north China and Manchuria". Henry Doré documented the worship of the Fox God in the northern parts of Jiangsu and Anhui. In parts of Hebei, to every newborn is assigned his own běnshén (本神; "patron god") manifestation of Huxian, usually a female for a boy and a male for a girl. After these boys and girls get married, their patrons will be represented sitting together. In his survey of popular shrines and temples in Manchuria, Takizawa Shunryō found the number dedicated to Fox Gods overwhelming.

== See also ==
- Fox spirit
  - Huli jing
  - Kitsune
  - Kumiho
- Inari Ōkami

Other

- Chinese folk religion
- Chinese gods and immortals
- Northeast China folk religion
- Shen (Chinese religion)

== Citations ==
=== Sources ===
- Kang, Xiaofei (2006). The Cult of the Fox: Power, Gender, and Popular Religion in Late Imperial and Modern China. Columbia University Press. ISBN 0231508220.
