= Xita Church =

Church in Shenyang, China

Coordinates: 41.8042°N 123.4128°E

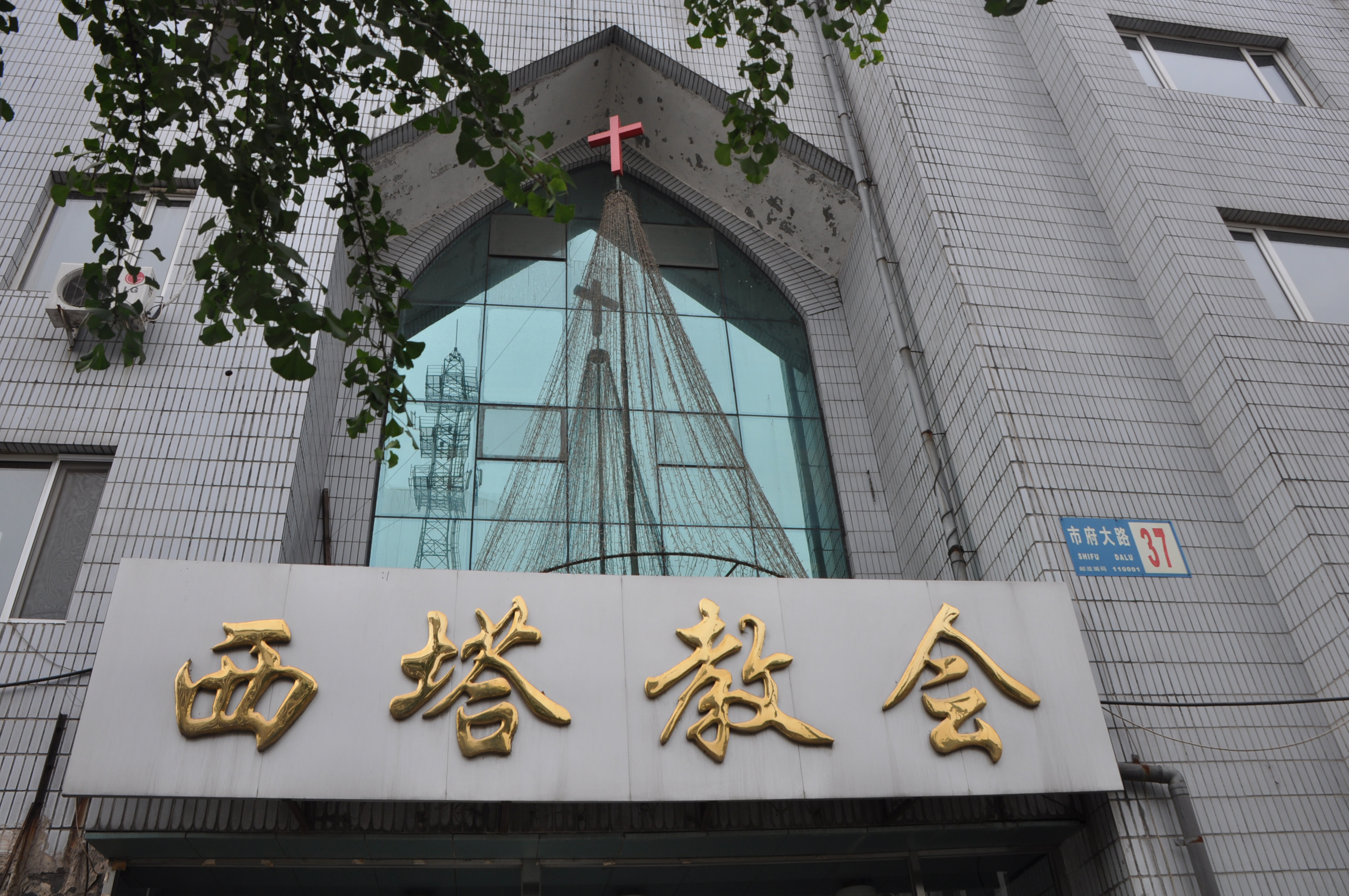
Xita Church

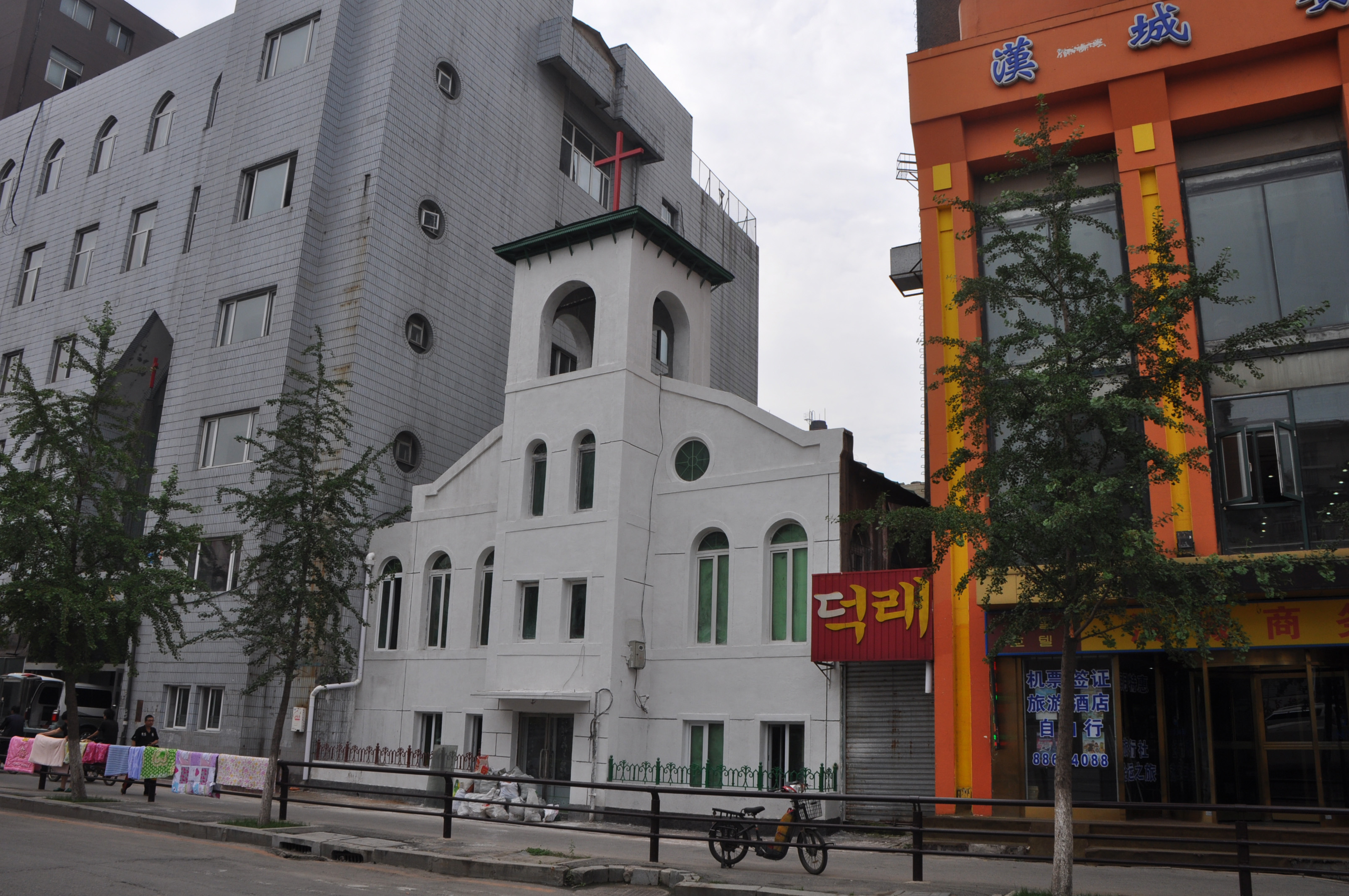
The Old Xita Church

Xita Church (Chinese: 西塔教会) is a Protestant church for the Korean Chinese, located in the Xita area of Heping District, Shenyang, Liaoning Province, China.

== History ==
A brief history is as follows:

- 1913, five missionaries of the women's group of the Protestant churches in Uiju, North Pyongan, Korea, arrived.
- 1917, the original church (now preserved on the right side of the present-day church) was completed.
- 1951, all Korean missionaries went back to Korea.
- 1957, Wu Aien (Chinese: 吴爱恩) became responsible.
- 1966–1979, the church was closed during the Cultural Revolution.
- 1981, Wu Aien became the pastor.
- 1993, the present-day 6-storey church building was dedicated.
- 2003, a Chinese-language group was started.

== Today ==
- Address: No. 37, Shifu Dalu, Heping District, Shenyang City, Liaoning Province
- Number of Christians: 3,000

== See also ==
- Christianity and Protestantism
- Christianity in China, Protestantism in China and Three-Self Patriotic Movement
- Dongguan Church and Sacred Heart Cathedral of Shenyang, in Shenyang
