= Shanrendao =

Confucian-Taoism religious movement in northeast China

Universal Church of the Way and its Virtue 善人道 Shànréndào
- Type: Confucian-Taoism Church
- Classification: Chinese salvationist religion
- Founder: Jiang Shoufeng
- Origin: 28 September 1921; Tai'an, Shandong
- Members: 1930s: 8 million (25% of Northeast China's population)
- Other name: World Morality Society / Ethical Society

Shanrendao (Chinese: 善人道; pinyin: Shànréndào; lit. 'Way of the Virtuous Man') is a Confucian-Taoist religious movement in northeast China. Its name as a social body is the Universal Church of the Way and its Virtue (万国道德会; Wànguó Dàodéhuì) or simply the Church of the Way and its Virtue (道德会; Dàodéhuì), which is frequently translated as the Morality Church. Shanrendao can be viewed as one of the best examples of the jiaohua (教化; jiàohuà; 'spiritual transformation') movements.

It is one of the most prominent Chinese salvationist religions, and was formally established as the Universal Church of the Way and its Virtue in Shandong in 1921 by Jiang Shoufeng (1875–1926), a member of the Confucian Church (孔教会; Kǒngjiàohuì) of Kang Youwei. Kang Youwei himself was the president of the church during the last year of his life. The movement was concerned with a reconstitution of morality, at a time in which people no longer understood what morality means because of the decline of religion. By the 1930s the religion had a strong presence in Manchuria, where it persists to the present day.

A great contribution came from Jiang Shoufeng's son, Jiang Xizhang (1907–2004), an intellectual prodigy who composed commentaries on the Confucian classics before the age of ten. Father and son composed vernacular versions of the classics in order to disseminate Confucianism among the Chinese masses. After the World War I, Xizhang wrote a leaflet, the Xizhanlun with anti-war teachings inspired by the content of the world religions.

The strongest impetus in the social importance of the movement, however, came from Wang Fengyi (王凤仪; 1864–1937), a charismatic healer and preacher of peasant origins who led the Universal Church of the Way and its Virtue in the 1930s. He is celebrated as a peasant saint throughout northeast China, a shànrén (善人; 'virtuous man') with the epithet "Wang the Good" or "Virtuous King" (王善人), a wordplay as his surname means "king" or "ruler".

== Doctrine and practice ==
Coloured symbol of Shanrendao theory

Wang Fengyi elaborated a doctrine and practice based on self-knowledge, self-realisation, and self-reliance, based on traditional Chinese theology and cosmology, especially the five elements (五行; wǔxíng) and the yinyang cosmology. The five elements constitute everything and also characterise the five behaviours of the human being. The harmony of the person and the society depends on the proper cultivation of these characters according to the different contexts.

Shanrendao is deeply influenced by the Taizhou school of Wang Yangming's Neo-Confucianism, but the tradition synthesises the entirety of Chinese religion. Its goal is to find the roots of one's life; return to the principles of the bond between Heaven, Earth and humanity according to one's own experience.

All kinds of human emotions are thought to arise from social interaction, from the family to the larger community. Wang Fengyi's teachings emphasise the role of emotion in healing. Reconciliation, gathering for ritual and storytelling (parables are taken from the Chinese tradition and the life of Master Wang) able to "turn the heart of the participants", are the primary practice of the movement. These methods are called "talking the disease away by appealing to one's higher nature".

=== Three natures and Dao ===
Wang Fengyi's doctrine holds that the human being tends to the five virtues of empathy (仁; rén), ritual and propriety (礼; lǐ), integrity and trust (信; xìn), justice and righteousness (义; yì), and wisdom (智; zhì), and to the five vices of anger (怒; nù), hatred (恨; hèn), blame (怨; yuàn), irritation and judgment (恼; nǎo), and annoyance and disdain (烦; fán). These tendencies take part in the three natures of man, which they characterise more or less.

The state of virtue is 1. tiānxìng (天性; 'heavenly nature', which can be translated as "natural disposition"), while the outward disposition (meaning the tendency to impose oneself on others) is 2. bǐngxìng (禀性), and it is generally dominated by vices and selfishness. 3. Habits (习性; xíxìng) are neither of the two, and they are rather engendered by the necessity of interaction with the circumstances, which lead to certain choices and preferences. The aim of Wang's healing is to extinguish imposition of the self on others, and reduce habits, in order to deliver the heavenly nature of humanity. Tianxing is the state of Dào, and it is the integration and harmony of spirit, body and mind, of nature (性; xìng), heart (心; xīn) and body (身; shēn).

=== Social doctrine ===
The Universal Church of the Way and its Virtue inherited Wang's teachings on the importance of the family, seen as the basis of citizenship and social regeneration. According to Wang's teachings the family institution has to be frugal and morally pure.

Wang protested the inadequacy of historical religions, protesting that they neglected or demeaned women. Wang emphasised the importance of the woman in the institution of the family, and the necessity of women's education and independence in the Way. Wang Fengyi promoted an indigenous mass female learning movement which competed with the missionary schools of the Catholic Church in Manchuria.

== Foundation and spread ==
=== The Jiangs and Kang Youwei ===
Jiang Shoufeng and his son Jiang Xizhang began to organise the movement in 1916. Jiang Shoufeng was originally a member of Confucian Church of Kang Youwei, but was turned away by hard-line Confucian trends within the church. The Jiangs theorised that a moral foundation was needed for the Chinese in order to contrast with Western imperialism, which they perceived as resting on a policy of eradication of the morality of conquered populations. The Universal Church of the Way and its Virtue was officially founded on 28 September 1921, the birthday of Confucius, in Tai'an, Shandong.

The church attracted members from various backgrounds and government officials. Even the American Christian missionary Gilbert Reid became a member of the church, and Kong Decheng (1920–2008), then Confucius' first descendant in direct line, became the honorary chairman. Kang Youwei, the "Martin Luther of Confucianism", founder of the Confucian Church, was the president of the Universal Church of the Way and its Virtue in 1926–27, the last year of his life.

The Universal Church of the Way and its Virtue underwent a significant reform in 1926–28 when Jiang Shoufeng died, Kang Youwei was ill and dying, and Jiang Xizhang went abroad. The leadership was taken by a capitalist from Heilongjiang, Du Yannian (1878–1957), who recruited the charismatic healer and preacher Wang Fengyi.

=== Wang Fengyi's leadership ===
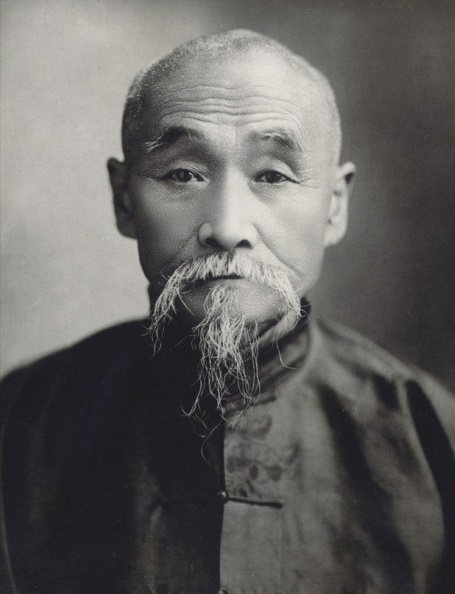
Wang Fengyi (1864–1937)

Wang Fengyi was born on 1 November 1864 to a peasant family of Wangjiayinzi village, Chaoyang, Rehe (nowadays Liaoning). His parents were Mongolian, and he was primarily a self-taught ox herder. He had an older brother, Wang Shutian (王树田), and two younger brothers, Wang Shushen (王树森) and Wang Shuyong (王树永). At the age of 23 he married Bai Shoukun (白守坤) and they had a son, Wang Guohua (王国华). Wang Fengyi did not receive a high education because of poverty, and at the age of 35 he realised the Dao and became a wandering healer and preacher of traditional Confucian morality.

By the time of his contact with Du Yannian, Wang had already founded the Voluntary Schooling movement for girls, which by 1925 had established 250 schools throughout Manchuria. Wang's schools merged with the Universal Church of the Way and its Virtue, and by 1933 the church had 500 branches, 400 schools and 200.000 students in northeast China.

Wang Fengyi gave a great impetus to the Universal Church of the Way and its Virtue, which in the 1930s had 8 million members in northeast China (25% of the population). Nowadays he continues to be celebrated as a peasant saint throughout the region, a shànrén (善人; 'virtuous man') with the epithet "Wang the Good" or "Virtuous King" (王善人) as his surname means "king" or "ruler".

=== Contemporary developments ===
In mainland People's Republic of China the Universal Church of the Way and its Virtue ceased to exist as a social organisation recognised by political authorities since the Communist Revolution of 1949 until recent decades. Shanrendao persisted as an "underground" movement across the Maoist period and the Cultural Revolution.

Since the relaxation of antireligion policies in the 1980s the movement has resurfaced and it has grown back especially in its heartland, northeast China (Manchuria), where the members preach filiality and Wang Fengyi's healing methods, mostly organised in the form of house churches. Lineages of local healers are organised in "farms", and successfully employ storytelling, lectures on virtue, personal confessions, and a set of five chanted affirmations modeled on the five elements.

Headquarters of the "Church of the Way and its Virtue" have been established again in Beijing in the 2010s. Wang Fengyi's teachings have also been adopted by the contemporary Beijing Confucian group Yīdān xuétáng (一耽学堂).

== See also ==
- Confucianism
- Confucian church
- Chinese salvationist religions
- New religious movement
- Taoism
