= American Indian opera =

Musical subgenre

American Indian opera is a subgenre of music of the United States. It began with composer Gertrude Bonnin (1876–1938), also known as Zitkala-Sa ("Red Bird" in Lakota). Bonnin drew from her Yankton Dakota heritage for both the libretto and songs for the opera The Sun Dance Opera. This full-scale opera was composed with William F. Hanson, an American composer and teacher at Brigham Young University in Utah.

== Significance ==
Unlike the "American Indianist" attempts to create operas with American Indian themes (see selected list below), with librettos written and music composed by non-Indians, The Sun Dance (1913) was a collaboration in which Zitkala-Sa contributed some of the music and libretto. For years, she received no credit. She had studied classical music. After teaching music and studying violin at Boston's New England Conservatory of Music, Bonnin worked with Hanson in Utah to compose an American Indian opera.

Bonnin performed and transcribed "Sioux melodies", to which she and Hanson added harmonies and lyrics. Because American Indian melodies had been an oral tradition, trying to adapt them to use in an opera was, according to Warburton, "like forcing a proverbial square peg into a round hole." Bonnin and Hanson successfully managed the transition. Ute singers and dancers performed in the opera, although the major roles were performed by European-American singers with opera training.

The importance of Bonnin for American Indian opera cannot be underestimated but scholars do not agree on the extent of her role. Few if any American operas on American Indian themes, using indigenous performers, have been composed by American Indians since her era. This Yankton woman was likely the first indigenous composer who can be considered to have achieved this. According to Catherine Parsons Smith, she was aided by William F. Hanson, who taught at Brigham Young University. He continued to compose works based on Native American themes. But Hanson is generally credited as composer for the opera, and Tara Browner describes Zitkala-Sa as a contributor.

== Selected "Indianist" operas by non-indigenous composers ==
- Nevin, Arthur F. (1907). Poia, opera. Carnegie Hall.
- Cadman, Charles Wakefield (1912), Nelle Richmond Eberhart, and Francis LaFlesche (Omaha). Da-O-Ma: Ramala (Land of Misty Water), opera in four acts. It was never published or produced. (Note: This opera was written in collaboration with Francis La Flesche (Omaha), so it appears to be similar to Zitkala-sa's joint project. See Sherry L. Smith, "Francis LaFlesche and the World of Letters," American Indian Quarterly 25.4 (2001): 579–603.)
- Cadman and Nelle Eberhart (1894–1943), and Tsianina Redfeather Blackstone (Creek), Shanewis (or The Robin Woman) (1918). Metropolitan Opera. Note: Blackstone was not given official credit.
- Freer, Eleanor Everest (1927). The Chilkoot Maiden, opera in one act. Skagway, Alaska.
- Carter, Ernest Trow (1931). The Blonde Donna: The Fiesta at Santa Barbara, opera comique. Heckscher Theater, New York.
- Smith, Julia Frances (1939). Cynthia Parker, opera in one act. North Texas State University, Denton.
- Gary A. Edwards (composer (2016). |A.J. Spawn (inspired lyrics) Qualchan And Whistalks, opera in three acts, Unperformed.

== American Indian opera by American Indian composers ==
- Bonnin, Gertrude, and Hanson, William F. (1913). The Sun Dance Opera, grand opera. Premiered in Orpheus Hall, Vernal, Utah.
- Raven Chacon, and Yun, Du (2020). Sweet Land. Premiered at Los Angeles State Historic Park.
- Jaakola, Lyz and Johnson, Hannah. Mináǧi kiŋ dowáŋ: a Zitkála-Šá Opera. (My Spirit Sings) Premiered on film, Minneapolis 2022.

== See also ==
- Tsianina Redfeather Blackstone (Muscogee, 1882–1985), mezzo-soprano opera singer
- Barbara McAlister (Cherokee Nation), mezzo-soprano opera singer
