= National Council of American Indians =

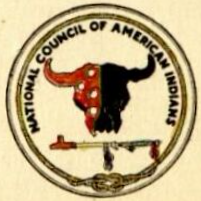
National Council of American Indians Insignia

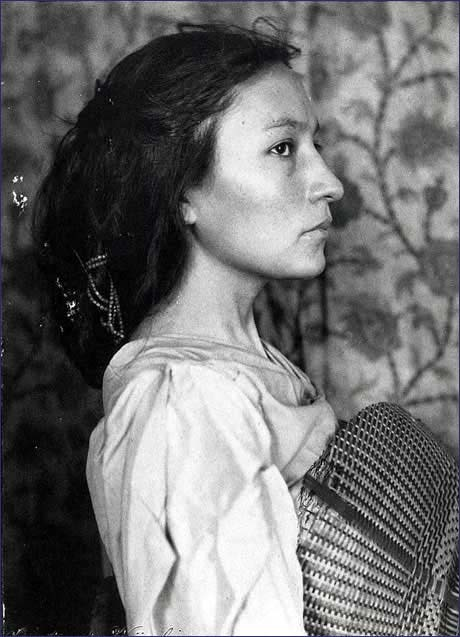
Zitkála-Šá, President of the National Council of American Indians

The National Council of American Indians (NCAI) was established in February 1926. This organization's purpose was to advocate for Native American rights and representation before the United States government.

The National Council of American Indians focused on the Legislative Branch and their Congressional bills. The council's initial concerns included the H.R. 7826; a bill that would give Congress the power to jail any Indian for six months without trial or any court review. In addition to this, this bill would enforce a $100.00 fine every time a rule was broken within the time served in prison, as outlined by the regulations.

The beginnings of inquiry about this council began with Zitkála-Šá (also known as Gertrude Bonnin) and Theodora Cunningham on March 1, 1926. Zitkála-Šá, along with her husband Raymond Bonnin, founded the National Council of American Indians. They both were Yankton Sioux Indigenous people. Zitkála-Šá and Raymond Bonnin's contributions to the National Council of American Indians started with its establishment as well as its leadership.

== Organization ==
Zitkála-Šá wanted the Native American population to become more informed about the persecution within Congress. After a heated House Committee meeting with Representative William Williamson, there was disagreement of how Native Americans wanted to be treated within American society. During the committee meeting, Williamson argued that Native Americans wanted the H.R. 7826 law to be passed. Zitkála-Šá a and her husband Raymond Bonnin fought against this bill to be passed. In response to this Committee meeting, multiple Indian national representatives formed the National Council of American Indians, and made Zitkála-Šá the president.

The other members of the National Council of American Indians included: Vice President Joshua Wetsit, Executive Secretary Treasurer Meade Steele, and Counsellor General R.T. Bonnin (Raymond Bonnin).The tribes included in the National Council of American Indians included the Apache, Assiniboine, Comanche, Chippewa, Crow, Kiowa, Klamath, Miami, Oneida, Osage, Ponca, Sioux, and Utes. As time went on, more tribes were represented through individual memberships and chapters across the United States.

While there were many Indigenous nations represented, Zitkála-Šá and Raymond Bonnin were represented in legal representation and visibility, because of their leadership roles with the council. Not all Native American tribes were able to be represented and the National Council of American Indians documents only showed the names of the tribes who agreed to be on the council. Both Zitkála-Šá and Raymond Bonnin corresponded with people across the United States as well as traveled to publicize the NCAI as legitimate way to keep the U.S. government responsible.

== Zitkala-Ša and Raymond Bonnin’s Contributions ==
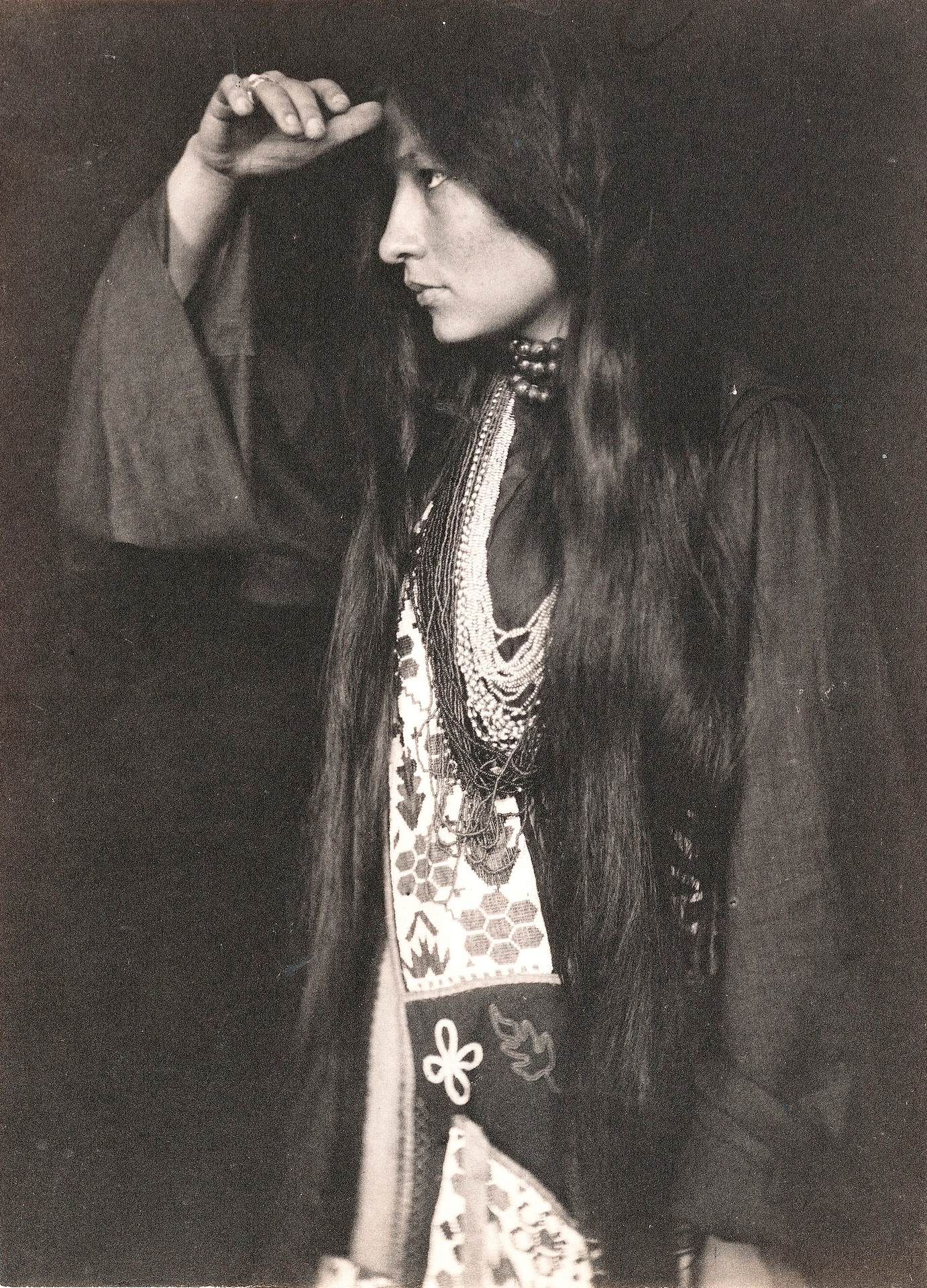
Zitkála-Šá by Gertrude Käsebier, 1898

Zitkála-Šá was also a member of the League of American Penwomen, and their mantra was "who’s who in the nation’s capital, 1927" which informed its members role of Congress and gained access to information about Congressmen in Washington, D.C. The League of American Penwomen was an organization started in 1897 by Marian Longfellow O'Donoghue. This organization would later help with connecting Zitkála-Šá's activism later in life. In a letter from March 5, 1928, Zitkála-Šá informed the delegation about the important members of the House Committee on Indian Affairs and specifically whom to speak to. In addition to this, she also advocated for the passing of H.R. 9315. In Section 2 of this bill, it would prohibit the unlawful jailing of Indians and permit them the due process of law as well as providing special law enforcement on the reservation.

Zitkála-Šá's dedication for Native American rights was shown through her participation with the American Indian magazine, Old Indian Legends, among other artistic projects. She was also a member of the Society of American Indians, created in 1911, which influenced the creation of the Council of American Indians. Zitkála-Šá would go on to become an accomplished author of many articles and stories as well as an opera. Her work with the Bureau of Indian Affairs was vital for the continued activism for Native Americans within the United States government.

Raymond Bonnin was culturally Yankton and Dakota Yankton and was assigned to work for the Uintah-Ouray reservation, where they worked at fourteen years. He also overtook the position of Executive Secretary-Treasurer in 1929, after Meade Steele. He also was able to fight alongside Zitkála-Šá for the rights of the National Council of American Indians. At his funeral, Ernest Wilkinson, President of Brigham Young University and prominent leader in the Church of Jesus Christ of Latter-Day Saints gave the eulogy. Wilkinson was the lawyer Raymond worked with to progress Indigenous lands claims through the U.S. court system.

== Purpose ==
On the official documentation, the purpose of the National Council of American Indians was, "Help Indians help themselves in protecting their rights and priorities." The work of the National Council of American Indians at this time was to track legislation through Congress that involved Native Americans.

"For the protection and preservation of all Indian People" was the mantra for the National Council of American Indians. This phrase concentrated Zitkála-Šá ’s efforts and the ability to spread information to other Native Americans. When concerning what their purpose should be, Zitkála-Šá said, "We must resort to this means of mutual protection sooner or later; and we must not fuss or find fault with minor things; but all look to the big things that are possible of accomplishment if we truly unite our forces; If the Indian people want to live; and want their children to live, they must ORGANIZE; therefore they must join us." Zitkála-Šá was one of many who drove the fight for Native American rights through organization as well as the spreading of information.

== Advocacy ==
An example of policies and laws Zitkála-Šá would be referring to in her activism work

In addition to fighting against discriminatory action against Native Americans, the National Council of American Indians also promoted voting rights among tribes. When concerned with the language of the H.R. 7826 bill, Zitkála-Šá said, "A man like Williamson should not be in Congress and you Indians out there should see to it that he does not get re-elected. You should all register and vote against him." The National Council of American Indians was able to tract the bills concerning Native American rights because of Zitkála-Šá's ties to the League of American Penwomen.

In addition to H.R. 7826, the council also advocated for the H.R. 9315 bill, and raised attention to the need for land rights. From February 1926 to the early 1930s, the NCAI was able to work steadily to gain lands claims for various tribes across the United States, because of Raymond Bonnin's extensive legal work.

Zitkála-Šá and others in the NCAI lobbied congress members, local representatives, friends, and families, to become educated and involved in Indigenous land claims, sovereignty rights, and social problems.

== Death of Zitkála-Šá ==
Zitkála-Šá died at the age of sixty-one on January 26, 1938, and is buried in Arlington National Cemetery under the name Gertrude Simmons Bonnin. Her funeral was in a chapel for the Church of Jesus Christ of Latter-Day Saints. Her family experienced many illnesses including her son as well as the serious grief of Raymond Bonnin.

Raymond Bonnin worked closely with Ernest Wilkinson to submit claims cases to Congress after Zitkála-Šá ’s death. When writing about her legacy to others, he said, "She had always wanted me to go on working in the event that she should go first and so I am trying to do the things that I know she would have done had she been here. It is not easy to go on without her. She and I always worked in everything side by side, her interests were my interests and she never failed to help me whole heartedly in my work."

In March 1938, Raymond Bonnin was still Secretary-Treasurer and "sole-surviving officer" of the National Council; he wrote to the Third Assistant Postmaster General that the council was still in existence. He was determined to keep her work and legacy alive. However, the council was not able to survive because of tax exemption complications as well as the poverty of the members and lack of outside funding. At no time had the Council exceeded the amount of $1300 in any one year, and these funds were used for the basic needs of the organization; including stationery and office rent. After Raymond Bonnin's death, there was no succession of leadership within the National Council of American Indians. The National Council of American Indians, Inc. ended with the Bonnins in 1942.

== Legacy ==
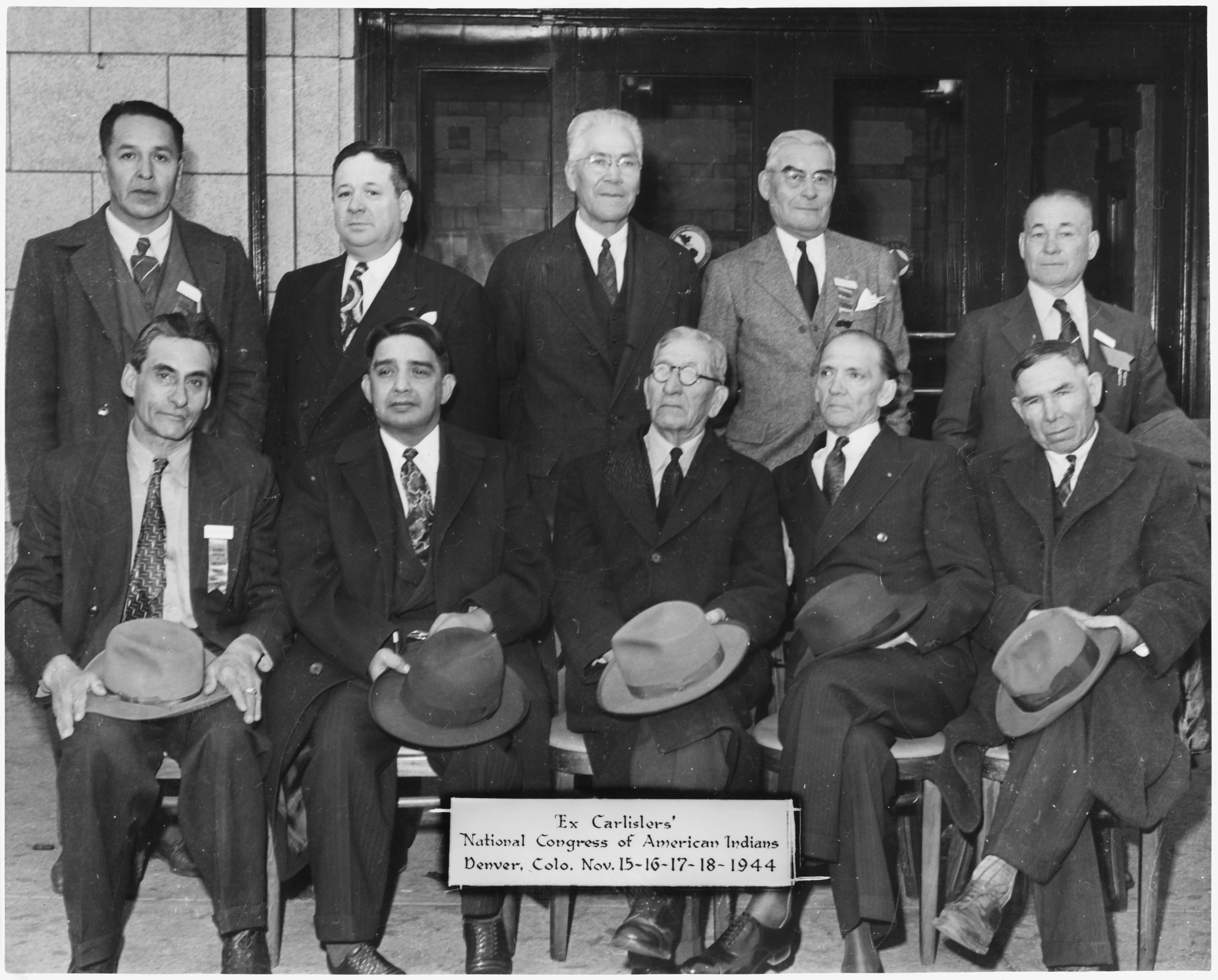
First Meeting of the National Congress of American Indians

The National Congress of American Indians was created on November 17, 1944. The National Council of American Indians and the National Congress of American Indians in purposes and activism both advocate for the progression of Native Americans within the United States. After the death of Zitkála-Šá and Raymond Bonnin, there was not a replacement of leadership. This caused the council to dissolve and the National Congress of American Indians was founded in 1944 and advocates for Native Americans through various initiatives.

The current concerns of the National Congress of American Indians include community and culture; economic development and commerce; education, health, and human services; land and natural resources; and tribal governance. As of April 2019, the NCAI responded to an EPA legislation, proposing to revise the definition of water rights within the United States. Other legal filings are associated with the Tribal Supreme Court Project.
