= Charles C. Painter =

Charles C. Painter (1833–1895) was an American abolitionist, Native American advocate and Congregational minister. The son of a Virginia planter who freed the people he enslaved before the American Civil War, Painter served on the faculty of Fisk University, dedicated to the education of African Americans. He was a prominent member of the Indian Rights Association, working out of the organization's Boston office, and, with Samuel M. Brosius, had a long career as an IRA agent and lobbyist in Washington, D.C.

Founded in Philadelphia in 1882, the Indian Rights Association's stated objective was to "bring about the complete civilization of the Indians and their admission to citizenship." In 1884, the organization's founders, Herbert Welsh and Henry Pancoast, opened an additional office in the District of Columbia to act as a legislative lobby and liaison with the Board of Indian Commissioners and the Board of Indian Affairs in 1884. The Indian Rights Association also maintained close contacts with Indian agents and with native groups themselves through correspondence and trips to reservations and settlements. Painter made frequent trips to reservations to investigate the actions of Indian Bureau agents and to observe the living and health conditions of Native Americans.

Painter personally favored Indian citizenship and the abolition of Indian reservations. He also lobbied heavily for the institution of the Allotment policy introduced by Senator Henry L. Dawes and passed in 1887 as the Dawes Act.
