= Cevanne Horrocks-Hopayian =

British composer, singer, and harper

- Born: Suffolk, England
- Education: Girton College, Cambridge; GSMD; Trinity Laban Conservatoire of Music and Dance
- Occupations: Composer, singer
- Website: www.cevanne.org

Cevanne Horrocks-Hopayian is a British composer, singer, and harper. She is considered one of today's leading emerging composers.

== Biography ==
Horrocks-Hopayian was born in Suffolk, England and is of British/Armenian descent. As a child, she attended Junior Guildhall, the Saturday school run by Guildhall School of Music and Drama. She later attended Girton College, Cambridge where she graduated with a first class degree in music in 2005. At Girton College, she was awarded the Rima Alamuddin Composition Prize in 2004, the Turle Scholarship for Music in 2006, and the Gamble Prize for Research in 2006. She held a scholarship at Trinity Laban Conservatoire in London in 2006–07.

== Career ==
Horrocks-Hopayian began working with the London Symphony Orchestra in 2010–11, as a participant in their Panufnik Scheme. She wrote for the London Symphony Orchestra Community Choir in 2017. The London Symphony Orchestra also commissioned her to arrange a traditional Gamelan piece, 'Ngedas Lemah', for première at the Barbican Centre with the London Symphony Orchestra Community Gamelan and London Symphony Orchestra Strings. She is a London Symphony Orchestra Soundhub Associate and has broadcast for their show on Resonance FM.

=== Residencies ===
She became Visiting Fellow Commoner at Girton College in 2020.

She was inaugural composer-in-residence for the London Symphony Orchestra at Khadambi Asalache's House, 575 Wandsworth Road from 2015 to 2017. Horrocks-Hopayian's work has a strong visual and tactile element, which she calls "Eye Music", structuring rather than simply decorating her music.

Horrocks-Hopayian was composer-in-residence at Handel House Museum from 2012 to 2014. In February 2016, she launched Handel House Museum's opening of Jimi Hendrix's flat to the public by performing original material in collaboration with Jessica Hynes, bassist Calum Gourlay, guitarist Christopher Montague and artist Maya Ramsay.

=== Awards ===
Sound and Music (formerly spnm) awarded her their artistic director (then Kuljit Bhamra) Project: 'Bhangra Latina', in 2007.

An Arts Council England Award enabled her to record her first (experimental pop) album, 'Big Ears', which was inspired by her experience of partial deafness. She won another Arts Council England Award for her oratorio, The Evolution of Eve. (2012)

In 2013 she gained a PRS award for Consortium5's commission L'envoi, commemorating the death of suffragette Emily Wilding Davison.

The Evolution of Eve was developed in 2013 with Sveriges Radio into a broadcast, 'DJ Helga', aimed at young people. It reached the last five at the international Prix Marulić, hosted by Croatian Radiotelevision in 2015.

In 2015, Horrocks-Hopayian was commissioned to write 'Ser Սեր (Love)' for the London Jazz Festival, performed by herself alongside guitarist Christopher Montague. She developed the piece for SATB choir in 2017, which won a BASCA call for works by BAME composers. It was premièred by the BBC Singers, and recorded for BBC Radio 3.

Trish Clowes commissioned Horrocks-Hopayian to write 'Muted Lines' for her project "My Iris" in 2016. "Muted Lines" won the BASCA British Composer Award in 2017.

In 2018, Melodia Women's Choir of New York City commissioned Red Bird, sharing the story of Zitkala-Sa, for its Women Composers' Commissioning Award, with world premiere performances in New York City.

=== Nominations ===
She was finalist for two BASCA British Composer Awards in 2017: "Muted Lines" was nominated for the Jazz Composition category, and "Khadambi's House" was nominated for the Chamber Ensemble category.

She was finalist, with Hugh Jones, as Crewdson, in the BASCA British Composer Awards in 2018 in the Sonic Art category for "Two Machines". This featured a new musical instrument developed by Horrocks-Hopayian and Crewdson, called the 'sonic bonnet', through which she can trigger sounds. Cevanne was featured in the New Music event at the BBC Proms 2019 with the Sonic Bonnet and her harp.

She was nominated, with Hugh Jones, for an Ivor Novello Award at The Ivors Classical Awards 2023. Rites for crossing water, their outdoor installation, augmented reality book and EP built around instructional texts, imagined as folklore for the future was nominated for Best Sound Art.

== Selected works ==
=== Chamber ensemble ===
- Khadambi's House (2017) for soprano, sinfonietta and tape (LSO commission) – BASCA British Composer Award 2017 finalist
- Bird Dance (2017) for soprano and sinfonietta
- The Ladies (2017) for soprano and sinfonietta
- Cave Painting I & II (2015–17) for violin and viola
- Muted Lines (2017) for alto voice, tenor sax, organ, bass, drums and sinfonietta – British Composer Award winner 2017
- Ser Սեր (Love) (2015) for jazz quartet
- 23 Brook Street (Jimi's Walls) (2015–2016) for guitar, harp, bass
- The Extra Room (2015–2016) for alto voice, guitar, harp, bass
- Petrified (2016–2017) for alto voice, guitar, harp, bass
- L'Envoi (2013) for consort recorders
- Ombre Spezzate (2013) for jazz ensemble
- How is a World like a Window (2012) for two violins, cello, bass clarinet & hang
- Turquoise Trail (2012) for harp & strings
- Dark Garden (2008) for voice, trumpet, piano, bass, congas, tabla, timbales
- Hunting Bow (Home is where the harp is) (2011) for harp ensemble (clarsach, kora, krar)
- If I could say (2010) for lever harps (BBC Radio 3 commission)
- Round 4 (2014) for violin and cello
- When I Return (2014) for viol da gamba and optional voice
- Jumpy One (2013 -) for jazz ensemble

=== Orchestra ===
- Ngedas Lemah (trad. arrangement) (2017) for string orchestra (LSO commission)
- Love Like Salt (Amor Como Sal) (2016) for youth orchestra and electronics
- A Dancing Place (2010) for symphony orchestra
- Record (2008) for orchestra and electronics

=== Vocal ===
- The Swallow (2017) for soprano & string quartet
- Inkwells (2016–2017) for voice & tape
- House Music (2014) for soprano & keyboard
- 'A Brief Description of the Excellent Virtues of that Sober and Wholesome Drink, called Coffee' (2014) for voice & accompaniment
- Sari Siroon Yar (trad. arrangement) (2012) for voice and strings
- From The Unseen World (2014) for voice and strings
- Stars & Stars (stjärnor och stjärnor) (2012–2013) voice, chorus, hang, harp, cello
- Lilith (2012–2013) voice, harp, hang, cello
- Don't Fret (2012) voice, accompaniment
- The Nature of Spirit (2012) voice, cello
- Turing Believes Machines Think (2012) voice, cello
- Time and the Crocodile (2010) voice and band with drum kit
- Clever Girl (2010) voice and band with drum kit
- Ad Break Tamzara (2010) chamber
- Shadow (2009–2010) voice and band with drum kit
- DS (2006–2007) voice with accompaniment (original: clarinet, vibraphone, harpsichord)
- We're Watching You (2009–2010) voice and band with drum kit
- Big Ears (2010) voice, piano, harp, cello, drum kit, tabla
- Moving Country (2007) voice & accompaniment – text by Choman Hardi

=== Choral ===
- Red Bird (2018) for SSAA and string quartet
- Ser Սեր (Love) (2017) for SATB a cappella
- The Fence-Sitter (2017) for amateur SATB and brass quintet (LSO commission)
- Round 3 (2017) for multiple voices
- Cave Painter (2015) for SATB and string quartet
- Vocal Shore (2009) for SATB and trumpet
- City Tree (2007) for SATB a cappella

=== Electronics ===
- Two Machines (2018), for voice and found sounds
- Walls & Ways (2016–2017) for clarinet and tape
- Two Sisters (2016–2017) for voice and electronics
- Sisa's Well (2013–2017) for voice, harp and found sounds
- They Forgot (2017) for voice, harp and found sounds
- OMG (2007) for voice and found sounds
- 3 M'Lord (2006)

=== Theatre ===
- DJ Helga (2013) voices, hang, harp, cello for Sveriges Radio Drama – Prix Marulic, Croatian Radiotelevision (HRT) 2015 finalist
- The Evolution of Eve Oratorio (2012) sop & alto voice, hang, harp, cello, xylosynth, electronics, chorus
- The King-napped King (2015) narrator, alto, harp, piano
- The Firebird and other Russian Tales (2011) narrator, soprano, harp, piano
- Women of Trachis, Sophocles, (2005), Khorus, violin, saxophone, piano
- Past/Future/Fracture (2008) ensemble and electronics for dance

=== Dance ===
- Seasons in our World (2019), Ballet with orchestra and electronics, for Birmingham Royal Ballet. Choreographed by Laura Day (Spring), Lachlan Monaghan (Summer, Autumn), Kit Holder (Winter).

=== Opera ===
- Generation (2019), Libretto Sabrina Mahfouz, commissioned by Hera Opera Company
- FAKE OR STAKE! (2019), Royal Opera House, Linbury Theatre, Libretto, Jessica Walker
- 1000 Songs (2019) Development Residency, Snape Maltings, with Libretto, Ziazan Horrocks-Hopayian; Director Seta White
- 1000 Songs (2018), Scene, with chamber orchestra and electronics, for Arcola (London Grimeborn). Libretto, Ziazan Horrocks-Hopayian. First performed by Ziazan Horrocks-Hopayian (The Enchantress); Abigail Kelly Nightingale

== Discography ==
=== As writer/producer and performer ===
- 2021 – Welcome Party – LSO, with Jon Hargreaves, conductor. Soloists: Ziazan (soprano), Cevanne Horrocks-Hopayian (voice), Trish Clowes (Tenor Saxophone), Tim Giles (drums) Ausiàs Garrigós Morant (Clarinet and bass clarinet), Choir of Girton College Cambridge (NMC)
- 2020 – Panufnik Legacies III – LSO, with François-Xavier Roth, 'A Dancing Place (scherzo)' (London Symphony Orchestra Publications)
- 2019 – BRACE – with Hugh Jones, as Crewdson and Cevanne, (Accidental Records). The album includes Two Machines, which was nominated for BASCA British Composer Award in Sonic Art, 2018)
- 2015 – The Evolution of Eve EP – from the Sveriges Radio play DJ Helga. Performers – Manu Delago, Ziazan Horrocks-Hopayian, Gregor Riddel, Cevanne Horrocks-Hopayian (Phyllis Tweed Publications)
- 2013 – Peekaboogie – written by Jessica Hynes, with Maral Mohammadi, Ziazan Horrocks-Hopayian, Ben Kelly, George Bird, Wayne Francis, Cevanne Horrocks-Hopayian (Phyllis Tweed Publications)
- 2010 – Big Ears – Performers – Zoe Rahman, Kuljit Bhamra, Kareem Dayes, Maral Mohammadi, Cevanne Horrocks-Hopayian, Ziazan Horrocks-Hopayian (Phyllis Tweed Publications)

=== Featured ===
- 2017 My Iris – Trish Clowes – as composer for track 'Muted Lines' (winner of BASCA British Composer Award 2017) (Basho Records)
- 2013 Fable:Time Shama Rahman – as performer (Bandcamp)
- 2011 Galaxies not ghettos – United Vibrations – as performer- (12 Tone CIC)
- 2008/9 Bhangra Latina – Kuljit Bhamra, Alex Wilson track 'Dark Garden' – as composer & performer (KEDA Records)
