= Melodia Women's Choir =

- Origin: New York City
- Genres: Classical, Art music, SSAA, Choir
- Years active: 2003–present
- Website: melodiawomenschoirnyc.org

Melodia Women's Choir NYC is a women's choir in Manhattan dedicated to exploring, creating and performing classical and contemporary music composed for women's voices. An ensemble of 30 singers, Melodia performs concerts in New York City, and supports emerging women composers through commissions and performances.

== History ==
Melodia Women's Choir was founded in 2003 by Jenny Clarke, an arts administrator and the Executive Director of the group. She is also the Executive Director of the National Flute Association (NFA). Cynthia Powell, the founding conductor, has served as the Artistic Director of Melodia Women's Choir since its inception. She is also the Artistic Director of The Stonewall Chorale.

An ensemble of 30 singers, Melodia Women's Choir presents two unique concerts each year. It has featured more than 230 choral works, including 12 world premieres and nine commissioned selections. Melodia Women's Choir has performed at Symphony Space, Merkin Concert Hall, Church of Saint Ignatius Loyola, DiMenna Center for Classical Music at the Baryshnikov Arts Center, St. Peter's Jazz Church, Holy Apostles Church in Chelsea, West End Collegiate Church, Queens Museum, St. Peter's Church in Chelsea, Church of St. Luke in the Fields, Bohemian National Hall, Temple Sinai (New Jersey), Surrogate's Courthouse of New York City as guest artists for Women's History Month sponsored by the New York City Comptroller's Office, and elsewhere.

Heard on WQXR's The Choral Mix with Kent Tritle, on WNYC radio, Q2 Radio of WQXR-FM, and WNBC TV, Melodia Women's Choir has twice been selected for the WNYC Star Initiative.

Melodia Women's Choir of NYC is a 501c3 nonprofit organization.

== Music ==
Melodia Women's Choir sings a wide range of classical music and classically-styled art music written for upper voices.

Among the works sung by Melodia Women's Choir are: Salut Printemps by Claude Debussy, Three Shakespeare Madrigals by Emma Lou Diemer, The Rose Trilogy by Eleanor Joanne Daley, Piping down the valleys wild by Herbert Howells, Learsongs by William Mathias, Choral Hymns from the Rig Veda by Gustav Holst, Farewell by Fanny Mendelssohn, Concierto de Navidad by Paul Cosonka, Four Russian Peasant Songs for Women's Chorus and Four French Horns by Igor Stravinsky, Les Sirenes by Lili Boulanger, Angel Band by William Batchelder, arranged by Anonymous 4, The Snow by Edward Elgar, Awakening the Spirit by John Rutter, The Dancers by Grace Williams, Autumn by Gwyneth Walker, Tóta Púlchra Es from Quatre Motets by Maurice Duruflé, The Chambered Nautilus by Amy Beach, Quarry Weave by Meredith Monk, The Journey by Catherine Aks, The Lamb by John Tavener, and many more.

In 2007, Melodia performed Gloria in D major, RV 589, by Antonio Vivaldi, as originally written for the female voices of the Ospedale della Pietà in Venice in the early 1700s.

In 2009, Melodia Women's Choir performed Olivier Messiaen's Trois petites liturgies with an all-women's orchestra in conjunction with Sacred Voices in a Sacred Space. The concert, Visions of Eternity, also included Lament, in Memoriam Olivier Messiaen, an homage to the composer by Iranian-American Reza Vali, performed by singer Naila Aziz.

In 2013, Melodia Women's Choir participated in "Britten 100" to celebrate the centenary of composer Benjamin Britten with a performance of A Ceremony of Carols in a concert with harpist Rita Costanzi, pianist Taisiya Pushkar, percussionist Barbara Merjan and the Transfiguration Quintet.

In 2016, Melodia Women's Choir performed Largo by Antonín Dvořák from his symphony From the New World, using a special arrangement by Margaret Dryburgh and Nora Chambers who created the work in an internment camp in the East Indies in World War II. The performance, part of the concert Awakening the Spirit, was presented in conjunction with the New York Philharmonic 175th Anniversary Initiative.

In 2018, Melodia Women's Choir was honored by the New York City Council for "15 years of outstanding performances and beautiful music" and for "fostering greater harmony throughout our community and beyond." Melodia presented the World Premiere commissioned work, Red Bird, by Cevanne Horrocks-Hopayian inspired by the life of Zitkala-Sa in the concert, "Shadows Chasing Light."

In 2019, Melodia presented "GLORIA: Lifting the Veil on Vivaldi's Masterpiece," an all-female version of the classic work by Antonio Vivaldi, interspersed with dramatic text about the girls' orphanage in Venice where the composer led the music program. Melodia also produced the first ever summer sing for women’s voices.

In 2020, Melodia released two virtual choir selections, Gaelic Blessing by John Rutter in spring 2020 and "The Rose" by Ola Gjeilo on the poetry of Christina Rossetti in the Fall 2020 concert, "Songs of Love and Hope."

In 2023-24, Melodia Women's Choir celebrated its 20th anniversary with two new commissions by women composers, Dr. Zanaida Stewart Robles ("From the Stone Age," Fall 2023), and Emily Mason ("Your Children, Spring 2024). The choir was presented a Proclamation in spring 2023 from the New York City Council by Councilmember Erik Bottcher, "for raising women's voices and fostering greater harmony in New York City."

Lullaby, a CD released by Melodia Women's Choir, offers a collection of favorite lullabies from 16 classical or classically-styled composers, including Franz Schubert, Sally Lamb McCune, Gustav Holst, Ned Rorem, Johannes Brahms, Eric Whitacre, Paul Halley, Veljo Tormis and Bill Douglas (arranged by Allison Sniffin). Melodia Women's Choir is also heard on City of Breath, a CD by the Flutronix, co-founded by collaborators Nathalie Joachim and Allison Loggins-Hull.

== Commissioned composers ==
In order to nurture the next generation of women composers, Melodia Women's Choir has initiated commissions and performances of original works. Through its Women Composers Competition, Melodia Women's Choir selects and engages composers to write an original SSAA work for the choir.

Among the women composers commissioned by Melodia Women's Choir are: Allison Sniffin, Oyeme con los ojos (2006) and "Ekō" (2019); Becca Schack, In the End is My Beginning (2007); Chris Lastovicka, Notes Upon the Breeze (2009); Christina Whitten Thomas, Mornings With You (2011); Sally Lamb McCune, Questions About Angels (2012); Nina Siniakova, From the Four Winds (2013); Errollyn Wallen, Full Fathom Five (2014); Hilary Purrington, Cassandra (2016); Cevanne Horrocks-Hopayian, Red Bird (2018), Dr. Zanaida Stewart Robles, "From the Stone Age" (2023) and Emily Mason, Your Children.

== Collaborations ==
Melodia Women's Choir has participated in collaborations with a variety of organizations, including Wall to Wall at Symphony Space, The Stonewall Chorale, Urban QUO Orchestra, The Flutronix, New York Choral Consortium, Vox Nova Girls Choir of the NYC Special Music School, American Cancer Society benefit with Lola Astanova and Julie Andrews at Carnegie Hall, Washington Square Music Festival, Make Music New York, Lincoln Center Out-of-Doors in "the public domain" project, Dvořák American Heritage Association, the New York Philharmonic New World Initiative, Crime Victims Vigil, John Jay College 9/11 Commemoration, and others.
