= Zitkala-Ša =

Yankton Dakota writer (1876–1938)

- Zitkala-Ša in 1898, National Portrait Gallery, Smithsonian Institution

1st President of the National Council of American Indians
- In office 1926–1938
- Preceded by: Office established
- Succeeded by: Raymond Talephause Bonnin

Personal details
- Born: February 22, 1876 Yankton Indian Reservation, Dakota Territory
- Died: January 26, 1938 (aged 61) Washington, DC, US
- Resting place: Arlington National Cemetery (as Gertrude Simmons Bonnin)
- Citizenship: Yankton Dakota; United States (1924-1938)
- Spouse: Raymond Talephause Bonnin (m. 1902)
- Children: Raymond Ohiya Bonnin
- Parent: Thaté Iyóhiwiŋ ("Every Wind" or "Reaches for the Wind"), also called Ellen Simmons (mother)
- Education: White's Manual Labor Institute, Wabash, Indiana
- Alma mater: Earlham College
- Occupation: Writer; editor; musician; teacher at Carlisle Indian Industrial School; Bureau of Indian Affairs official for the Uintah-Ouray reservation; Native American activist; President of the National Council of American Indians
- Known for: Co-composed the first American Indian opera, founded the National Council of American Indians
- Writing career
- Language: English
- Years active: from 1900
- Genres: Children's story; legend; fictional autobiography; translation; poetry; libretto; essay; article; epistle; oration
- Subject: Indigenism
- Notable works: The Sun Dance Opera, Old Indian Legends, American Indian Stories, Oklahoma's Poor Rich Indians
- Movement: American literary regionalism

Zitkala-Ša, also Zitkála-Šá (Lakota: Zitkála-Šá, meaning Red Bird; February 22, 1876 – January 26, 1938), was a Yankton Dakota writer, editor, translator, musician, educator, and political activist. She was also known by her anglicized and married name, Gertrude Simmons Bonnin. She wrote several works chronicling her struggles with cultural identity, and the pull between the majority culture in which she was educated, and the Dakota culture into which she was born and raised. Her later books were among the first works to bring traditional Native American stories to a widespread white English-speaking readership.

She was co-founder of the National Council of American Indians in 1926, which was established to lobby for Native people's right to United States citizenship and other civil rights they had long been denied. Zitkala-Ša served as the council's president until her death in 1938. Zitkala-Ša has been noted as one of the most influential Native American activists of the 20th century. Working with American musician William F. Hanson, Zitkala-Ša wrote the libretto and songs for The Sun Dance Opera (1913), the first American Indian opera. It was composed in romantic musical style, and based on Sioux and Ute cultural themes.

== Early life and education ==
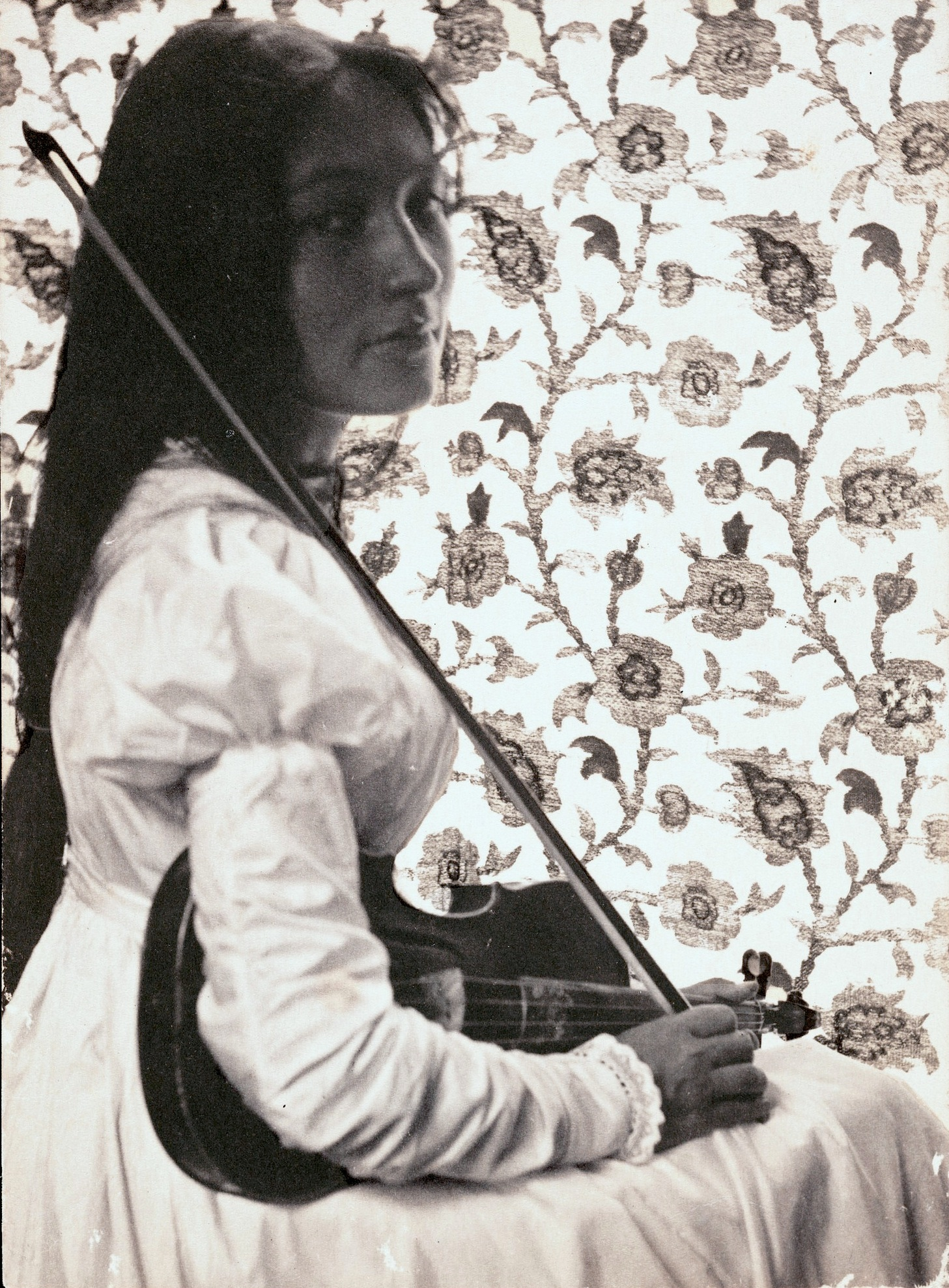
Zitkala-Ša with her violin in 1898

Zitkala-Ša was born on February 22, 1876, on the Yankton Indian Reservation in South Dakota. She was raised by her Dakota mother Thaté Iyóhiwiŋ ("Every Wind or Reaches for the Wind"), whose English name was Ellen Simmons. Her father was a Frenchman named Felker, who abandoned the family when Zitkala-Ša was very young.

For her first eight years, Zitkala-Ša lived with her mother on the reservation and learned the Dakota language. She later described those days as ones of freedom and happiness, safe in the care of her mother's people and tribe. In 1884, when Zitkala-Ša was eight, missionaries came to the reservation. They recruited several Yankton children, including Zitkala-Ša, taking them to be educated at the White's Indiana Manual Labor Institute, a Quaker missionary boarding school in Wabash, Indiana. This training school was founded by Josiah White for the education of "poor children, white, colored, and Indian" to help them advance in society.

Zitkala-Ša attended the school for three years until 1887. She later wrote about this period in her work, The School Days of an Indian Girl. She described the deep misery of having her heritage stripped away when she was forced to pray as a Quaker and to cut her traditionally long hair. By contrast, she took joy in learning to read, write, and play the violin.

In 1887, Zitkala-Ša returned to the Yankton Reservation to live with her mother. She spent three years there. She was dismayed to realize that, while she still longed for the native Yankton traditions, she no longer fully belonged to them. Besides, she thought that many on the reservation were conforming to the dominant white culture.

In 1891, wanting more education, Zitkala-Ša decided at age fifteen to return to the White's Indiana Manual Labor Institute. She planned to gain more through her education than becoming a housekeeper, a role the school anticipated most female students would pursue. She studied piano and violin and started to teach music at White's after the music teacher resigned. In June 1895, when Zitkala-Ša was awarded her diploma, she gave a speech on the inequality of women's rights, which was praised highly by the local newspaper.

Though her mother wanted her to return home after graduation, Zitkala-Ša chose to attend Earlham College in Richmond, Indiana, where she had been offered a scholarship. While initially feeling isolated and uncertain among her predominantly white peers, she proved her oratorical talents with a speech titled "Side by Side.” During this time, she began gathering traditional stories from a spectrum of Native tribes, translating them into Latin and English for children to read. In 1897, six weeks before graduation, she was forced to leave Earlham College due to ill health and financial difficulties.

== Music and teaching ==
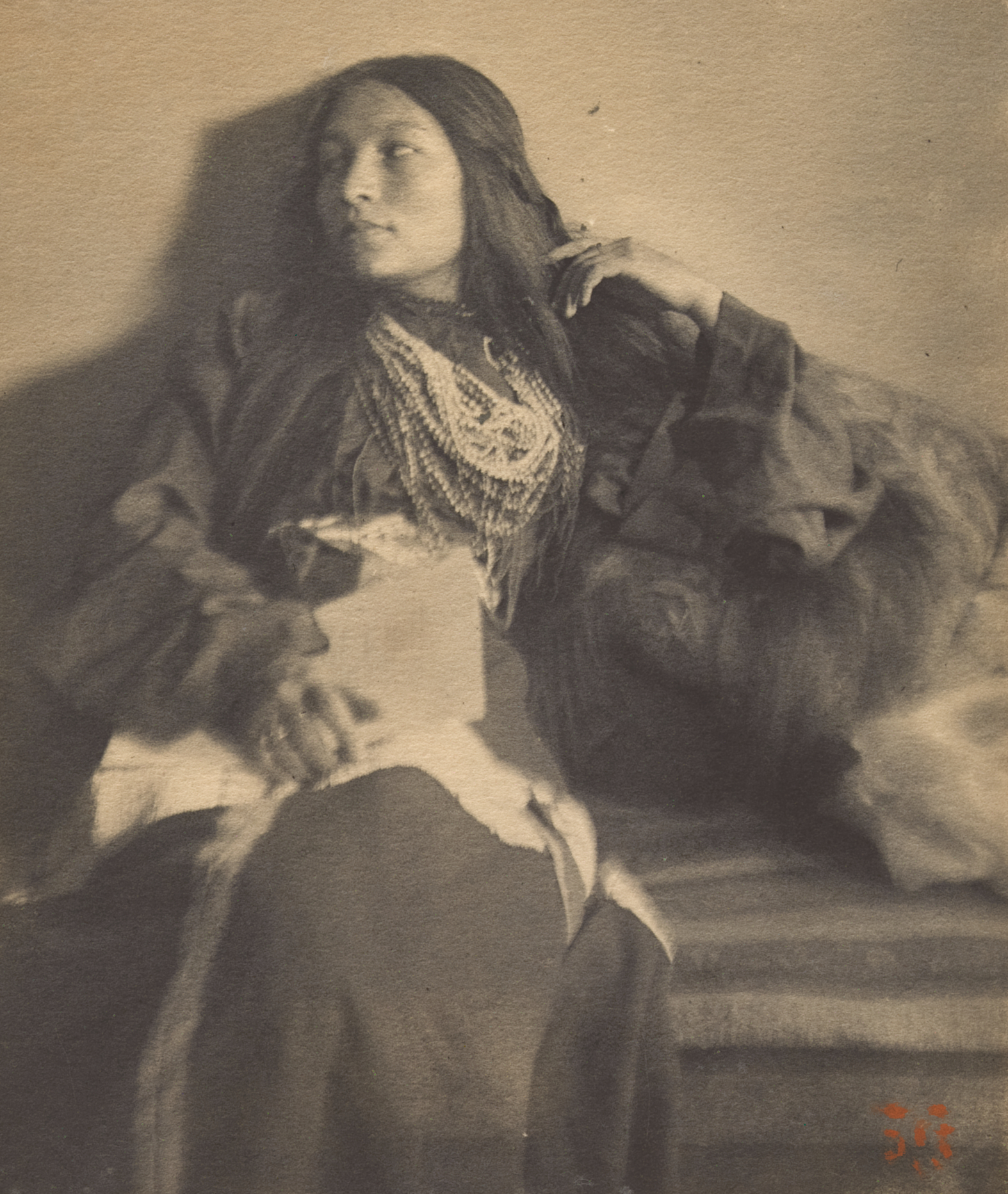
Zitkala-Ša, 1898, by Joseph Keiley

From 1897 to 1898 Zitkala-Ša studied and played the violin at the New England Conservatory of Music in Boston. In 1897, she took a position at Carlisle Indian Industrial School in Pennsylvania, where she taught music to children for about 18 months. She also facilitated debates on the treatment of Native Americans.

At the 1900 Paris Exposition, she played violin with the school's Carlisle Indian Band. In the same year, she began writing articles on Native American life, which were published in national periodicals such as Atlantic Monthly and Harper's Monthly. Her critical appraisal of the American Indian boarding school system and vivid portrayal of Indian deracination contrasted markedly to the more idealistic writings of most of her contemporaries.

Also in 1901, Zitkala-Ša was sent by Carlisle's founder, Colonel Richard Henry Pratt, to the Yankton Reservation to recruit students. It was her first visit in several years. She was troubled to find her mother's house in disrepair, her brother's family had fallen into poverty, and white settlers were beginning to occupy lands allotted to the Yankton Dakota under the Dawes Act of 1887.

Upon returning to the Carlisle School, Zitkala-Ša came into conflict with Pratt. She resented his rigid program to assimilate Native Americans into dominant white culture and the limitations of the curriculum. It prepared Native American children only for low-level manual work, assuming they would return to rural cultures. That year she published an article in Harper's Monthly describing the profound loss of identity felt by a Native American boy after undergoing the assimilationist education at the school, a story called "The Soft Hearted Sioux," which Pratt called "trash." In 1901, Zitkala-Ša was dismissed from the Carlisle School.

Soon after, she took a job as a clerk at the Standing Rock Indian Reservation where she likely met Bonnin.

== Marriage and family ==
Zitkala-Ša returned to the Yankton Reservation after her time at the Carlisle School and cared for her ailing mother. Her relationship with her mother was strained after a disagreement over Zitkala-Ša's decision to continue her education. She also spent this time gathering material for her collection of traditional Sioux stories to publish in Old Indian Legends, commissioned by the Boston publisher Ginn and Company.

In early 1901, she was engaged to Carlos Montezuma, a Yavapi (Mohave-Apache) doctor and Indigenous activist. Her letters to Montezuma verify that the Carlisle school and its president and founder were a major cause of concern. In her letters, she repeatedly mentions Pratt and Carlisle, calling Pratt "woefully small" and "bigoted" (5 March 1901) and writing that she "imagines Carlisle will rear up on its haunches" after one of her stories is published (Summer 1901). Zitkala-Ša explains to Montezuma that even though she "offends the Col.," she "won't be another's mouthpiece-[she] will say just what [she] thinks" (5 March 1901). It is both because of and through her rejection of Pratt and his educational plan that Zitkala-Ša inscribes her strategic rhetoric of pedagogical resistance. She broke off her engagement and relationship with Montezuma by August. He had refused to give up his private medical practice in Chicago and relocate with her to the Yankton Indian Agency, where she wanted to return.

In 1902, she met and married Raymond Talephause Bonnin, who was of Yankton-European ancestry and culturally Yankton. Soon after their marriage, Bonnin was assigned by the BIA to the Uintah-Ouray reservation in Utah. The couple lived and worked there with the Ute people for the next fourteen years. During this period, Zitkala-Ša gave birth to the couple's only child, Raymond Ohiya Bonnin.

Her husband, Bonnin, enlisted in the US Army in 1917 after the United States declared war against the German Empire during World War I. He was commissioned as a second lieutenant in 1918. He served in the Quartermaster Corps in Washington, D.C., and was honorably discharged with the rank of captain in 1920.

== Writing career ==
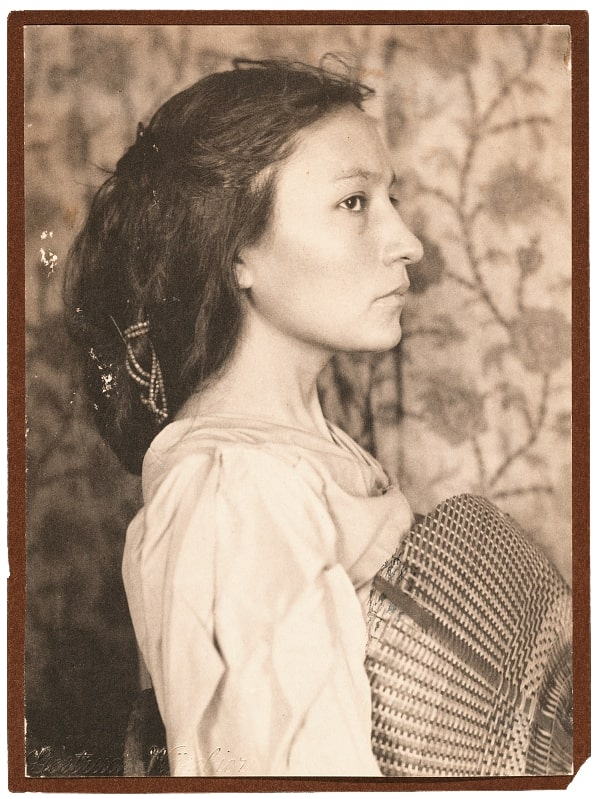
Zitkala-Ša, c. 1898, by Gertrude Käsebier

Zitkala-Ša had a fruitful writing career, with two major periods. The first period was from 1900 to 1904, when she published legends collected from Native American culture, as well as autobiographical narratives. She continued to write during the following years, but she did not publish any of these writings. These unpublished writings, along with others including the libretto of the Sun Dance Opera, were collected and published posthumously in 2001 as Dreams and Thunder: Stories, Poems, and the Sun Dance Opera.

Zitkala-Ša's articles in the Atlantic Monthly were published from 1900 to 1902. They included "An Indian Teacher Among Indians", published in Volume 85 in 1900. Included in the same issue were "Impressions of an Indian Childhood" and "School Days of an Indian Girl". Zitkala-Ša's other articles were published in Harper's Monthly. "Soft-Hearted Sioux" appeared in the March 1901 issue, Volume 102, and "The Trial Path" in the October 1901 issue, Volume 103. She also wrote "A Warrior's Daughter", published in 1902 in Volume 6 of Everybody's Magazine. In 1902, Zitkala-Ša published "Why I Am a Pagan" in Atlantic Monthly, volume 90. It was a treatise on her personal spiritual beliefs. She countered the contemporary trend that suggested Native Americans readily adopted and conformed to the Christianity forced on them in schools and public life.

Much of her work is characterized by its liminal nature: tensions between tradition and assimilation, and between literature and politics. This tension has been described as generating much of the dynamism of her work.

The second phase of her writing career was from 1916 to 1924. During this period, Zitkala-Ša concentrated on writing and publishing political works. She and her husband had moved to Washington, D.C., where she became politically active. She published some of her most influential writings, including American Indian Stories (1921) with the Hayworth Publishing House.

She co-authored Oklahoma's Poor Rich Indians: An Orgy of Graft and Exploitation of the Five Civilized Tribes, Legalized Robbery (1923), an influential pamphlet, with Charles H. Fabens of the American Indian Defense Association and Matthew K. Sniffen of the Indian Rights Association. Included in the Oklahoma's Poor Rich Indians publication was information about Stella Mason, as well as others. She also created the Indian Welfare Committee of the General Federation of Women's Clubs, working as a researcher for it through much of the 1920s.

=== American Indian Stories ===
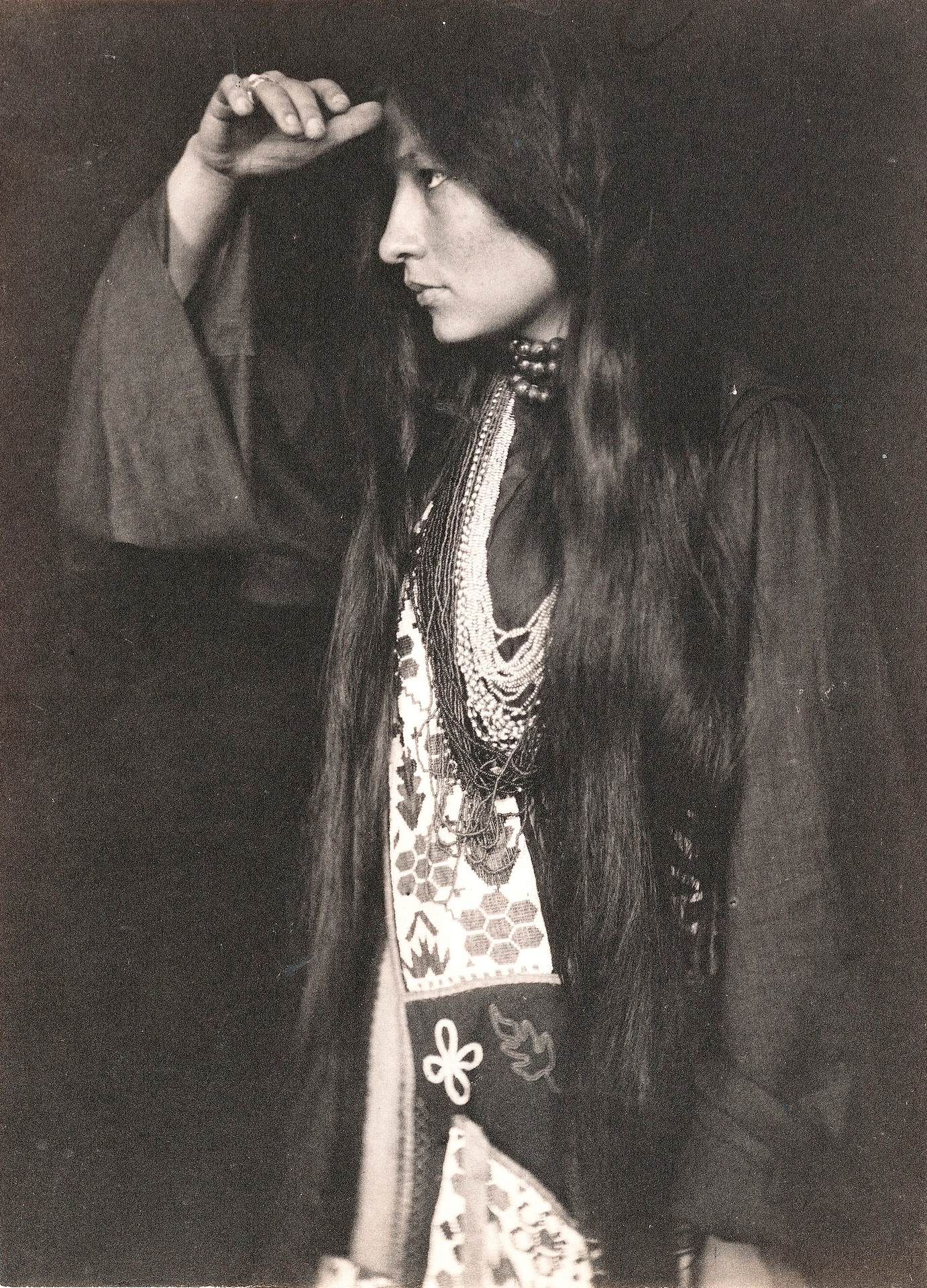
Zitkála-Šá, by Gertrude Käsebier, 1898

American Indian Stories is a collection of childhood stories, allegorical fiction, and an essay, including several of Zitkala-Ša's articles that were originally published in Harper's Monthly and Atlantic Monthly. First published in 1921, these stories told of the hardships which she and other Native Americans encountered at the missionary and manual labor schools designed to "civilize" them and assimilate them to majority culture. The autobiographical writings described her early life on the Yankton Reservation, her years as a student at White's Manual Labor Institute and Earlham College, and her time teaching at Carlisle Indian Industrial School.

Her autobiography contrasted the charm of her early life on the reservation with the "iron routine" which she found in the assimilation boarding schools. Zitkala-Ša wrote: "Perhaps my Indian nature is the moaning wind which stirs them [schoolteachers] now for their present record. But, however tempestuous this is within me, it comes out as the low voice of a curiously colored seashell, which is only for those ears that are bent with compassion to hear it."

=== Old Indian Legends ===
Commissioned by the Boston publisher Ginn and Company, Old Indian Legends (1901) was a collection of stories including some that she learned as a child and others she had gathered from various tribes. Directed primarily at children, the collection was an attempt both to preserve Native American traditions and stories in print and to garner respect and recognition for those from the dominant European-American culture.

=== "Oklahoma's Poor Rich Indians" ===
One of Zitkala-Ša's most influential pieces of political writing, "Oklahoma's Poor Rich Indians”, was published in 1923 by the Indian Rights Association. The article exposed several American corporations that had been working systematically, through such extra-legal means as robbery and even murder, to defraud Native American tribes, particularly the Osage. After oil was discovered on their lands, speculators and criminals tried to acquire their headrights to leasing fees from development of their oil-rich land in Oklahoma. During the 1920s, numerous Osage were murdered.

The work influenced Congress to pass the Indian Reorganization Act of 1934, which encouraged tribes to re-establish self-government, including management of their lands. Under this act, the government returned some lands to them as communal property, which it had previously classified as surplus, so they could put together parcels that could be managed.

=== Articles for American Indian Magazine ===
Zitkala-Ša was an active member of the Society of American Indians (SAI), which published American Indian Magazine. From 1918 to 1919 she served as editor of the magazine, as well as contributing numerous articles. These were her most explicitly political writings, covering topics such as the contribution of Native American soldiers to World War I, issues of land allotment, and corruption within the Bureau of Indian Affairs (BIA), the agency within the Department of Interior that oversaw American Indians. Many of her political writings have since been criticized for favoring assimilation. She called for recognition of Native American culture and traditions, while also advocating US citizenship rights to bring Native Americans into mainstream America. She believed this was the way that they could both gain political power and protect their cultures.

== Making an opera ==
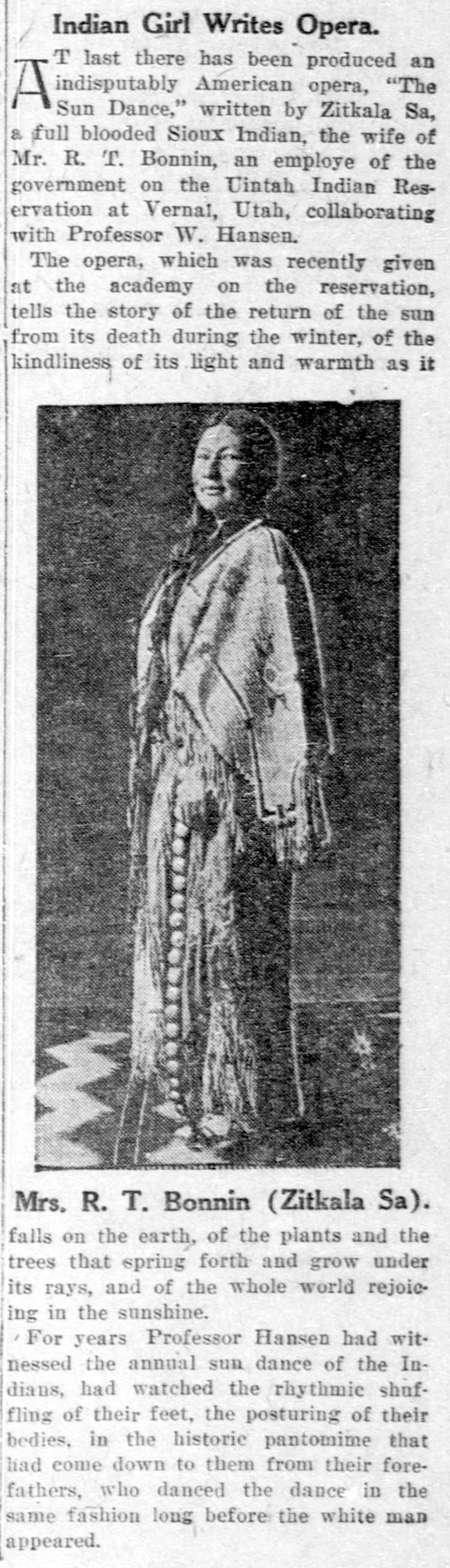
Contemporary 1913 newspaper article in the El Paso Herald about The Sun Dance Opera, referring to the then-37-year-old Zitkala-Ša as "girl"

While Zitkala-Ša lived on the Uintah-Ouray reservation in Utah, she met American composer William F. Hanson, who was a professor of music at Brigham Young University. Together, in 1910, they started their collaboration on the music for The Sun Dance Opera, for which Zitkala-Ša wrote the libretto and songs. The romantic musical combined Sioux and Ute cultural themes. She played Sioux melodies on the violin and flute, and Hanson used this as the basis of his music composition. She based it on the Lakota Sun Dance, which the federal government prohibited the Ute from performing on the reservation.

The opera premiered in Utah in February 1913, with dancing and some parts performed by the Ute from the nearby Uintah and Ouray Indian Reservation, and lead singing roles filled by non-natives. According to historian Tadeusz Lewandowski, it was the first Native opera. It debuted at Orpheus Hall in Vernal, Utah, to high local praise and critical acclaim. Few works of Native American opera since have dealt so exclusively with Native American themes.

In 1938, the New York Light Opera Guild presented The Sun Dance Opera at The Broadway Theatre as its opera of the year.

== Political activism ==
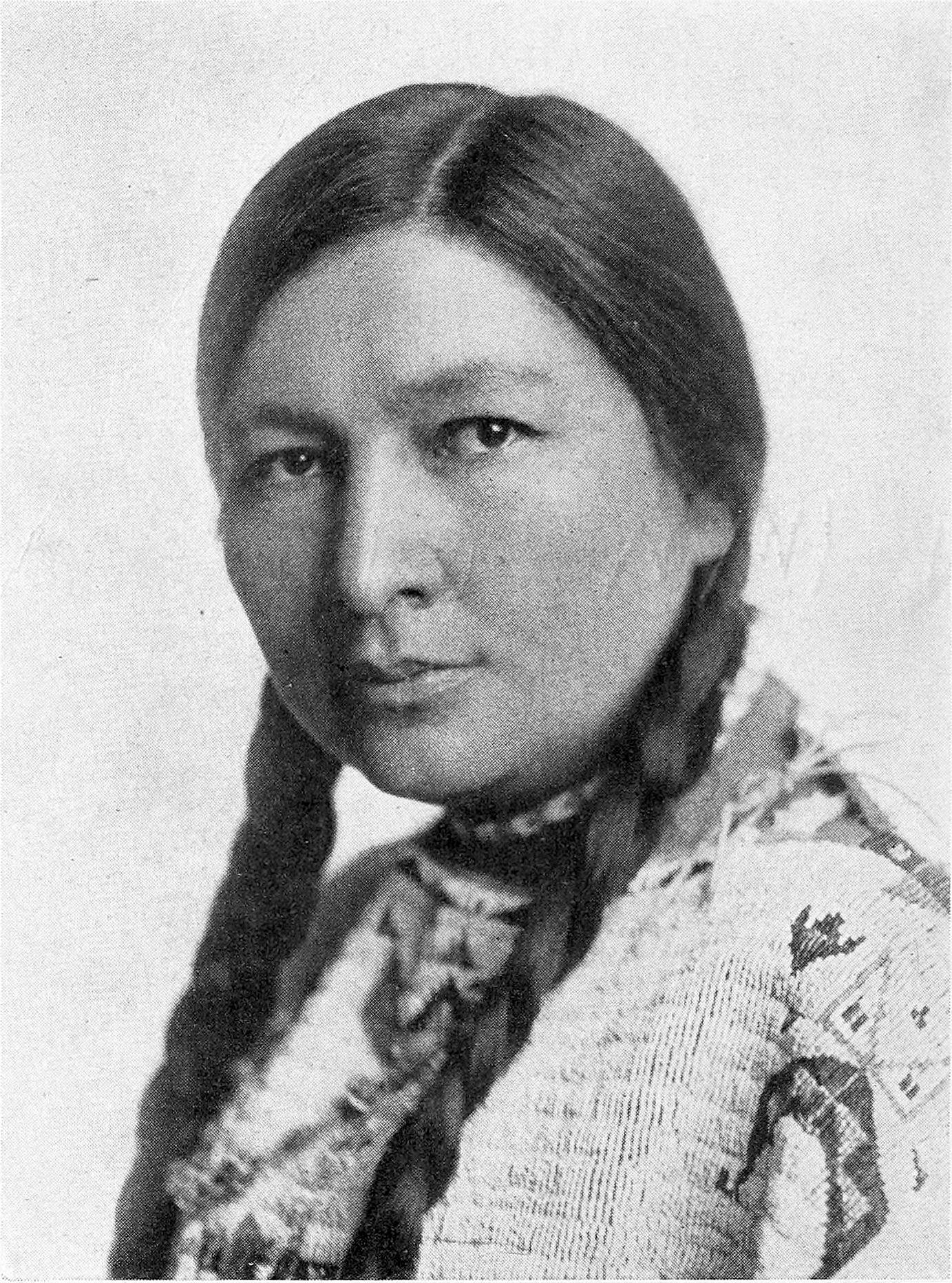
Zitkala-Sa, c. 1921

Zitkala-Ša was politically active throughout most of her adult life. During her time on the Uintah-Ouray reservation in Utah, she was involved with the Society of American Indians (SAI) which was dedicated to preserving the Native American way of life while lobbying for the right to full American citizenship. The letterhead of the council stationery claimed that the overall goals for SAI was to "help Indians help themselves in protecting their rights and properties". Zitkala-Ša served as SAI's secretary beginning in 1916. Since the late 20th century, activists have criticized SAI and Zitkala-Ša as misguided in their strong advocacy of citizenship and employment rights for Native Americans. Such critics believe that Native Americans have lost cultural identity as they have become more part of mainstream American society.

Zitkala-Ša and her family relocated to Washington, D.C., when the SAI appointed her as national secretary in 1916. As the secretary for SAI, Zitkala-Ša corresponded with the Bureau of Indian Affairs (BIA). She began to criticize practices of the BIA, such as their attempt at the national boarding schools to prohibit Native American children from using their native languages and cultural practices. She reported incidents of abuse resulting from children's refusal to pray in a Christian manner.

From Washington, Zitkala-Ša began lecturing nationwide on behalf of SAI to promote greater awareness of the cultural and tribal identity of Native Americans. During the 1920s she promoted a pan-Indian movement to unite all of America's tribes in the cause of lobbying for citizenship rights. In 1924 the Indian Citizenship Act was passed, granting US citizenship rights to most Indigenous peoples who did not already have it.

While Native Americans now had citizenship, discrimination remained widespread. In some states their right to vote was denied, a situation not fully changed until the Civil rights movement of the 1960s. In 1926, she and her husband founded the National Council of American Indians (NCAI), dedicated to the cause of uniting the tribes throughout the US in the cause of gaining full citizenship rights through suffrage. From 1926 until she died in 1938, Zitkala-Ša served as president, major fundraiser, and speaker for the NCAI. Her early work was largely forgotten after the organization was revived in 1944 under male leadership.

Zitkala-Ša was also active in the 1920s in the movement for women's rights, joining the General Federation of Women's Clubs (GFWC) in 1921. This grassroots organization was dedicated to diversity in its membership and to maintaining a public voice for women's concerns. Through the GFWC she created the Indian Welfare Committee in 1924. She helped initiate a government investigation into the exploitation of Native Americans in Oklahoma and the attempts being made to defraud them of drilling rights and leasing fees for their oil-rich lands. She undertook a speaking tour across the country for the General Federation of Women's Clubs where she called for the abolition of the Bureau of Indian Affairs.

In addition to her other organizing, Zitkala-Ša also ran a voter registration drive among Native Americans. She encouraged them to support the Curtis Bill, which she believed would be favorable for Indians. Though the bill granted Native Americans US citizenship, it did not grant those living on reservations the right to vote in local and state elections. Zitkala-Ša continued to work for civil rights, and better access to health care and education for Native Americans until she died in 1938.

== Death and legacy ==
Zitkala-Ša died on January 26, 1938, in Washington, D.C., at the age of 61. She is buried as Gertrude Simmons Bonnin in Arlington National Cemetery with her husband Raymond. In the late 20th century, the University of Nebraska–Lincoln reissued many of her writings on Native American culture. Zitkala-Ša's legacy lives on as one of the most influential Native American activists of the 20th century. She left an influential theory of Indian resistance and a crucial model for reform. Through her activism, Zitkala-Ša was able to make crucial changes to education, health care, and legal standing for Native American people and the preservation of Indian culture.

She has been recognized by the naming of a Venusian crater "Bonnin" in her honor. In 1997 she was designated a Women's History Month Honoree by the National Women's History Project. Zitkala-Ša lived part of her life in the Lyon Park neighborhood of Arlington County, Virginia, near Washington, DC. In 2020, a park in that neighborhood that had previously been named for Henry Clay was renamed in her honor.

In 2018, Melodia Women's Choir of New York City performed the world premiere of a commissioned work based on the story of Zitkala-Ša, Red Bird by Cevanne Horrocks-Hopayian. In 2022 an opera based on her life and work was released: Mináǧi kiŋ dowáŋ: A Zitkála-Šá Opera. It is the first opera to use Dakota language.

Chris Pappan illustrated a Google Doodle that incorporated ledger art for use in the United States on February 22, 2021, to celebrate her 145th birthday. Zitkala-Ša is featured on a 2024 American Women quarter. In 2024, the United States Mint and the National Women's History Museum hosted an event honoring her memory and celebrating the release of the American Women quarter depicting her.

== Writings by Zitkala-Ša ==
- Old Indian Legends. Lincoln: University of Nebraska Press, 1985.
- American Indian Stories. Lincoln: University of Nebraska Press, 1985.
- Zitkála-Šá. "Why I Am a Pagan." Atlantic Monthly, 1902.
- Zitkála-Šá, Fabens, Charles H. and Matthew K. Sniffen. Oklahoma's Poor Rich Indians: An Orgy of Graft and Exploitation of the Five Civilized Tribes, Legalized Robbery. Philadelphia: Office of the Indian Rights Association, 1924.
- Zitkála-Šá. Dreams and Thunder: Stories, Poems, and The Sun Dance Opera. Edited by P. Jane Hafen. Lincoln: University of Nebraska Press, 2001. ISBN 0-8032-4918-7.
- Zitkála-Šá: Letters, Speeches, and Unpublished Writings, 1898–1929. Edited by Tadeusz Lewandowski. Leiden, Boston: Brill Press, 2018. ISBN 978-90-04-34210-1.

== Scores ==
- Hanson, William F., and Zitkala-Ša. The Sun Dance Opera (romantic American Indian opera, 1913, 1938). Photocopy of the original piano-vocal score, from microfilm (227 pp.). Library of Brigham Young University, Provo, Utah.

== See also ==
- Old Indian Legends
- I Remain Alive: the Sioux Literary Renaissance
- Native American women in politics
- Zintkála Nuni

== Bibliography ==
- Baym, Nina (2007), Norton Anthology of American Literature (7th ed.), Norton, ISBN 978-0-393-92993-5.
- IAU (October 1, 2006), "Bonnin on Venus", Gazetteer of Planetary Nomenclature, International Astronomical Union.
- Buechel, Eugene; Manhart, Paul (2002) [1970], Lakota Dictionary: Lakota-English/English-Lakota (New Comprehensive ed.), Lincoln, Nebraska: University of Nebraska Press, ISBN 0-8032-1305-0, OCLC 49312425.
- Capaldi, Gina (2011), Red Bird Sings: The Story of Zitkala-Sa, Native American Author, Musician, and Activist, Millbrook Press, ISBN 978-0-7613-5257-0.
- Fear-Segal, Jacqueline (August 1999), "Nineteenth-Century Indian Education: Universalism Versus Evolutionism", Journal of American Studies, 33 (2): 323–341, doi:10.1017/S002187589900612X.
- Fisher, Dexter (August 1979), "Zitkala Sa: The Evolution of a Writer", American Indian Quarterly, 5 (3): 229–238, doi:10.2307/1183520, JSTOR 1183520.
- Giese, Paula (July 4, 1996), "Gertrude Bonnin, Zitkala Sha, Yankton Nakota", Native Authors.
- Gridley, Marion E. (1974), American Indian Women, Dutton, ISBN 978-0-8015-0234-7.
- Hafen, P. Jane (Autumn 1997), "Zitkala Sa: Sentimentality and Sovereignty", Wíčazo Ša Review, 12 (2): 31–41, doi:10.2307/1409205, JSTOR 1409205.
- Hafen, P. Jane (April 1, 1998), "A Cultural Duet/ Zitkala Sa And the Sun Dance Opera", Great Plains Quarterly.
- Henderson, Melissa Renee; Curtwright, Lauren (August 14, 2004), Gertrude Simmons Bonnin (Zitkala-Ša), hdl:11299/166100.
- Herzog, Kristin, Gertrude Bonnin.
- "Honorees: 2010 National Women's History Month", Women's History Month, National Women's History Project, 2010, archived from the original on November 27, 2010.
- Leeper, Jean (November 5, 2013), "Josiah White and His White's Iowa Manual Labor Institute", Ancestry.com.
- Lewandowski, Tadeusz (2016), Red Bird, Red Power: the Life and Legacy of Zitkala-Sa, University of Oklahoma, ISBN 978-0-8061-5178-6.
- Peyer, Bernd, ed. (2007), American Indian nonfiction: an anthology of writings, 1760s–1930s, Norman: University of Oklahoma Press, ISBN 978-0-8061-3798-8, OCLC 71004237.
- Peyer, Bernd C. (1997), The Tutored Mind: Indian Missionary-Writers in Antebellum America, Amherst: University of Massachusetts Press.
- Rappaport, Doreen (1997), The Flight of Red Bird: The Life of Zitkala-Ša, New York: Puffin, ISBN 978-0-8037-1438-0.
- Rappaport, Helen (2001), Encyclopedia of Women Social Reformers, vol. 1, ABC-CLIO, ISBN 1-57607-101-4.
- "Register of the Gertrude and Raymond Bonnin Collection, 1926–1938", L. Tom Perry Special Collections, Brigham Young University, December 1998.
- Smith, Catherine Parsons (January 2001), "An Operatic Skeleton on the Western Frontier: Zitkala-Ša, William F. Hanson, and the Sun Dance Opera", Women & Music.
- Stone, Tammy (2000), "Bonnin, Gertrude Simmons", American National Biography, Oxford University Press, doi:10.1093/anb/9780198606697.article.1500796, ISBN 978-0-19-860669-7.
- Susag, Dorothea (Winter 1993), "Zitkala-Sa (Gertrude Simmons Bonnin): A Power(full) Literary Voice", Studies in American Indian Literatures, 2, 5 (4): 3–24, JSTOR 20736763.
- Wilkins, David E.; Stark, Heidi Kiiwetinepinesiik (2018), American Indian Politics and the American Political System (4th ed.), Rowman & Littlefield, ISBN 978-1-4422-5265-3.
- Zitkala-Ša (1921), American Indian Stories, Washington, D.C.: Hayworth.
- Zitkala-Ša (2001), Hafen, P. Jane (ed.), Dreams and Thunder: Stories, Poems, and The Sun Dance Opera, Lincoln: University of Nebraska Press, ISBN 0-8032-4918-7.
- Zitkala-Ša (2009), The School Days of an Indian Girl, and An Indian Teacher Among Indians, Dodo Press, ISBN 978-1-4099-7860-2.
- Zitkala-Ša (1900), "Impressions of an Indian Childhood, School Days of an Indian Girl, An Indian Teacher among Indians", The Atlantic Monthly, 85: 37–47, 185–194, 381–386, hdl:2027/coo.31924079893750.
- Zitkala-Ša (1902a), "A Warrior's Daughter", Everybody's Magazine, 6: 346–352, hdl:2027/njp.32101013855539.
- Zitkala-Ša (1902b), "Why I am a Pagan", The Atlantic Monthly, 90: 801–803, hdl:2027/chi.78024087.
