= Matthew Sniffen =

American activist

Matthew K. Sniffen was an American activist. He worked for the Indian Rights Association and wrote about issues affecting Native Americans.

== Biography ==
In 1908, Sniffen testified before the United States Congress about the Crow Reservation having poor conditions, and allegations of corruption and profiteering by its United States Government appointed Indian Agent.

In 1911, he testified at the annual Lake Mohonk Conference. In 1916, he reported on the conditions of the Seminole in Florida and their efforts to secure land from the state.

Sniffen was photographed with George La Vatta in Talmaks, Idaho.

== Works ==
- Florida's Obligation to the Seminole Indians: A Plea for Justice (1883)
- Observations Among the Sioux
- A Man And His Opportunity (1914)
- The Indians of the Yukon and Tanana Valleys, Alaska (1914) with Thomas Spees Carrington
- A Problem Over Here (1919)
- Oklahoma's Poor Rich Indians, An Orgy of Graft and Exploitation of the Five Civilized Tribes, Legalized Robbery; a report (1924) co-authored with Gertrude Bonnin (Zitkala-Sa) and Charles H. Fabens
