= Stella Mason =

Twentieth-century Muscogee/Creek woman

- Born: Stella Manuel c. 1901
- Died: April 30, 1918
- Resting place: Blackjack Cemetery, Muskogee, Oklahoma, U.S.
- Known for: lawsuit related to Five Civilized Tribes abuses
- Spouse: Isaac Mason
- Children: 1

Stella Mason (née Manuel; born c. 1901 – died April 30, 1918) was a Muscogee/Creek Freedman, whose guardians and lawyers plundered her oil rich estate in Oklahoma. Her court case was published in newspapers and later was the subject of a publication. The exploitation was part of a pattern of abuse against Freedmen among the Five Civilized Tribes. The plundering by lawyers and guardians continued after she died, through the estate of her 1-year-old son, Isaac Mason Jr. A grand jury was convened to investigate guardianship cases and recommended sanctions against various attorneys and a judge, including those involved in her case.

== History ==
Stella Mason was orphaned in 1915. Her property was leased to Prairie Oil and Gas Company, a division of Standard Oil from 1900 to until 1911, when it was spun off after the Sherman Antitrust decision Standard Oil Co. of New Jersey v. United States. Lawyer C. Benjamin Jefferson was appointed as her guardian, but was later disbarred for taking $500 and expenses from Prairie Oil and Gas to persuade her to re-sign the lease in 1917. She married Isaac Mason while still a minor at boarding school in Washington D.C. In 1916, she gave birth to their son. She filed for divorce from her husband around May 1917, stating she felt he married her for the money.

Mason came of age and became entitled to her inheritance on May 21, 1917. At this time, her estate was valued at about $130,000 USD. The state assigned P. M. Ford as the administrator of her estate in June 1917; his work primarily involving sending occasional statements of any oil royalties received. Family members visited her with attorney Coody Johnson. Attorney and community leader A. G. W. Sango went to Washington D.C. and returned to Muskogee with her and her husband to retrieve her estate from her guardian. Lawyers Vilas K. Vernor and Ed K. Brooks induced her to sign a contract with them after she received her inheritance, contracting them as her sole lawyer for $5,000 per year for five years paid in advance. They were later disbarred for six months for their "unethical and unconscionable" actions in regards to Mason and her estate.

Mason died on April 30, 1918, and she was buried at the Blackjack Cemetery (formally known as Taft Cemetery) in Muskogee, Oklahoma. The state again appointed P. M. Ford as the administrator of the estate of her son, Isaac Mason, Jr.. He was subsequently removed from this role in 1923, after paying himself excessive allowances from the child's estate.

Zitkala-Sa co-authored Oklahoma's Poor Rich Indians: An Orgy of Graft and Exploitation of the Five Civilized Tribes, Legalized Robbery (1923) about Stella's experiences and similar abuses.
