= The Sun Dance Opera =

1913 opera by William F. Hanson and Zitkala-Ša

- Grand opera by William F. Hanson
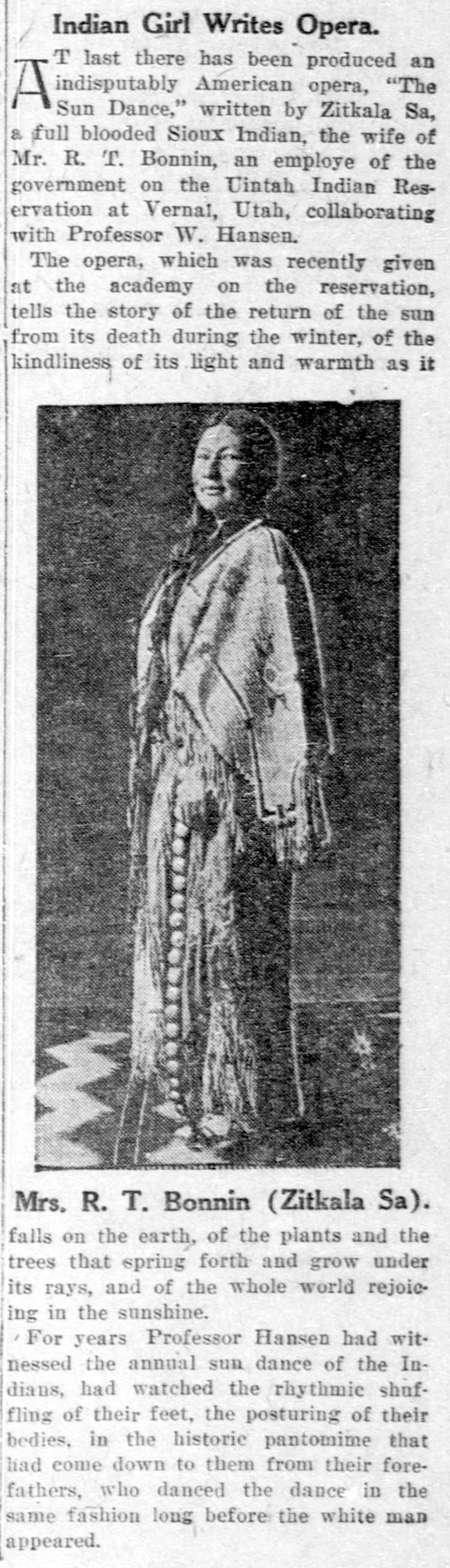
- 1913 newspaper article about The Sun Dance opera, written by Zitkala-Ša
- Other title: The Sun Dance
- Librettist: Zitkala-Ša
- Language: English
- Premiere: February 1913; Orpheus Hall in Vernal, Utah

The Sun Dance Opera is a 1913 opera with a score by William F. Hanson and libretto and songs by Zitkala-Ša, also known as Gertrude Simmons Bonnin. It is the first opera by a Native American person.

== Development ==
Zitkala-Ša met Hanson in 1910, and the two began working on the opera that year. According to N. L. Nelson, a colleague of Hanson at Brigham Young University, Zitkala-Ša was heavily involved with writing the show's story, revising the show's music, designing the show's costumes, and training "the dancers and singers so as to be true to the highest and best ideals of her people".

Bonnin drew on traditional Sioux melodies for the show's music, and chants were also included in the show's score. Some portions of the score, especially in the ensemble pieces, were also left open for performers to improvise or to sing their own chants or songs.

Hanson claimed his work on the opera was motivated by the desire to record Sioux culture.

== Premise ==
The opera is set in Pipestone Quarry near Yankton, South Dakota. The plot involves a love triangle between Sioux protagonist Ohiya, Sioux woman Winona, daughter of the chief, and the show's villain, Sweet Singer, a Shoshone man. The titular Sun Dance, a Plains Indians ceremony that had been outlawed since 1904, also plays a prominent role in the story.

The show's prologue features Sweet Singer leaving his home to travel to the "land [of] the Sioux," after he violated Shoshone religious rules. The story then properly opens with Ohiya and Winona, with Ohiya promising to earn her affections.

== Productions ==
The Sun Dance Opera debuted in February 1913, at Orpheus Hall in Vernal, Utah, playing for three nights. The cast featured members of the Ute Nation from the Uintah and Ouray Reservation, but the leads were played by non-Native singers. The opera saw some success, with the production touring the state over the next two years.

Bonnin was credited for her work on the opera, with a 1913 El Paso Herald article noting that she had written the piece.

The opera was performed several times at Brigham Young University, including twice in 1914 and once in 1935.

The opera premiered on Broadway on April 27, 1938, at the Broadway Theater, where it was put on by the New York City Light Opera for two nights. The New York Opera Guild presented the piece as the opera of the year. Bonnin was not involved in the production, nor in the revisions made to the libretto and composition. Hanson's revisions doubled the show's length, added a number of songs and rewrote those remaining from the original.

In a reversal of the 1913 casting, much of the ensemble were played by non-Natives, while many of the lead roles were played by Native Americans living in New York City.

At the time of the 1938 production, Zitkala-Ša was not credited for her work on the piece, nor was she credited when Hanson registered the opera with the U.S. Copyright Office.

== Publication ==
Original and microfilm copies of the manuscript, sheet music, and libretto are stored L. Tom Perry Special Collections of the Harold B. Library at Brigham Young University. The records are in fragile condition and photocopies are not allowed.

The libretto of the overture, prologue, acts I, II, III and IV, Sunset March, and act V are published in P. Jane Hafen's 2005 volume Dreams and Thunder: Stories, Poems, and The Sun Dance Opera (ISBN 9780803299191).

== See also ==
- Mináǧi kiŋ dowáŋ — a 2022 opera about the life and work of Zitkala-Ša
