= American Indian Stories =

1921 book by Zitkala-Ša

American Indian Stories is a collection of childhood stories, allegorical fictions and essays written by Sioux writer and activist Zitkala-Ša.

First published in 1921, American Indian Stories details the hardships encountered by Zitkala-Ša and other Native Americans in the missionary and manual labour schools. The autobiographical details contrast her early life on the Yankton Indian Reservation and her time as a student at White's Manual Labour Institute and Earlham College. The collection includes legends and stories from Sioux oral tradition, along with an essay titled America's Indian Problem, which advocates for rights for Native Americans and calls for a greater understanding of Native American cultures. American Indian Stories offers a unique view into a society that is often overlooked though that society still persists to this day.

== Book contents ==
=== Impressions of an Indian Childhood ===
==== My Mother ====
The story begins with a description of the big path that leads from Zitkala-Sa's childhood wigwam to a river which, in turn, makes its way to "The Edge of Missouri". Her mother would draw water from this river for household use. Zitkala-Sa would play at her mother's side, noting that she was often sad and silent. At the age of seven, Zitkala-Sa describes herself as 'wild' and 'as free as the wind that blew her hair'. Recounting a conversation with her mother on one of their return trips from the river, Zitkala-Sa told her that when she is older like her 17-year-old cousin Warca-Ziwin, she will come and get water for her. Zitkala-Sa's mother responded, "If the paleface does not take away from us the river we drink". Young Zitkala-Sa inquires about the palefaces, to which her mother responds, "My little daughter, she is a sham, a sickly sham!". Zitkala-Sa's mother describes the palefaces as the cause of much sorrow for their people, who stole their land and caused the deaths of Zitkala-Sa's cousin and uncle.

==== The Legends ====
Zitkala-Sa, as a "participant and observer", sketches the importance of the Legends of her people. In this story, Zitkala-Sa shares with the readers how, "I loved best the evening meal, for that was the time old legends were told. I was always glad when the sun hung low in the west, for then my mother sent me to invite the neighboring old men and women to eat supper with us." Zitkala-Sa's tribe had traditions for how and when to speak to elders, and especially how to listen to these legend stories. The atmosphere must be set, and in due time, the elders would tell the stories of their people, and pass on the Legends to the children of the tribe.

Such as Zitkala-Sa was told these legends as a child, she "attempted to preserve her people's oral tradition by transcribing oral tales into written English, as well as transcribing her life's story into autobiography." "That Zitkala-Sa was independent enough to write about her "varying moods" is a credit to her and a bonus for anyone interested in some of the impulses that launched an American Indian Literary tradition in English."

==== The Beadwork ====
The Beadwork is a descriptive story sharing the tradition of beadwork and its place in Zitkala-Sa's tribe. This story is from the experiences of a young girl who is learning the process of beadwork from her mother. Even during this time, Zitkala-Sa shares the experience of childhood envy in regards to the artist products of the beadwork of her friends. The Native American traditional education of learning the trade of beadwork is described with Zitkala-Sa sharing her "practical observation lessons in the art of beadwork." (Bonnin, 19) Zitkala-Sa ends this story with, "That evening, as on other evenings, I went to sleep over my legends," (Bonnin, 24) which points to the Legends noted in her other story, The Legends, as well as the childhood dreams of a young girl in Native life.

==== The Coffee Making ====
In this story, Zitkala-Sa discusses the first time she ever made coffee. Her mother had left her home alone and she was fearful of a crazy man who used to wander into wigwams. Someone did enter her wigwam, but it was an old grandfather who tells her stories. She remembers that when they have guests over, her mother makes them coffee and offers them food. Trying to be a good hostess she goes to make the coffee, although she does not know how. She tries, but what she ends up giving her grandfather is a cold mug of dirty water. Her mother arrives and sees that she has tried to make coffee and her and the grandfather laughed and her mother made more coffee. Zitkala-Sa did not feel embarrassed and it was not until she was older that she realized what she did was ridiculous.

==== The Dead Man's Plum Bush ====
In this story, Zitkala-Sa describes the day when strange people with painted faces come into her neighborhood to the new warrior Haraka Wambdi's wigwam. The crowd sits in the grass surrounding a fire with venison being cooked in kettles hanging above it. They are celebrating Wambdi's first battle by having a feast with the whole Indian village. Zitkala-Sa, still in her own wigwam, becomes restless seeing all of the guests heading over to the feast while she has to wait for her mother to finish cooking a duck. She asks her mother why she is cooking when they are about to go to a feast in which her mother replies that they are going to stop by an ill, elderly woman's wigwam to feed her on the way to the feast. This causes Zitkala-Sa to feel ashamed to have forgotten about the woman. As they walked, Zitkala-Sa was about to pick some plums off a plum bush when her mother stops her. Her mother explains that there was a dead Indian warrior buried there, and when he was buried they put plum seeds in his hand because he died with plum seeds in his hand. From those seeds rose a bush. Since then, Zitkala-Sa was careful around the bush and always listening for the whistle of departed spirits.

==== The Ground Squirrel ====
In the fall, Zitkala-Sa's aunt used to help her mother preserve foods for the winter. In the early mornings a misty smoke was visible above the marsh. Zitkala-Sa is afraid of this smoke and when it was visible, Zitkala-Sa never liked to go too far from her wigwam unless she was with her mother. Her mother and aunt would gather corn and Zitkala-Sa would have to watch it while it dried. Sometimes there was a little ground squirrel that would take some of the sweet corn. She wants to catch it but her mother fears that the ground squirrel might bite her fingers. After the corn was dried, her mother would start slicing pumpkins into thin rings and hang them in between a couple poles for them to dry. Her mother also dried berries, plums, and cherries. Out of everything that had happened when preserving things in the fall, she remembers the ground squirrel the most. Most of her memories from when she was a child were in the summer but she recalls a winter day when some missionaries gave her a bag of marbles. Some of the marbles were made of colored glass. She went walking down to the river one day with her mother where she saw big floating ice chunks. The light of the day had been reflecting colors in the ice and the colors reminded her of her marbles so she tried to pry the colors out of the ice. Her fingers got too cold for her to continue but from then on she thought marbles had river ice inside of them.

==== The Big Red Apples ====
Zitkala-Sa describes in this story about how she was 8 years old. She only was aware of her mother's native language. This is when the paleface missionaries began to visit her village. These visiting white men were recruiting Indian children to go to Eastern schools. Zitkala-Sa's mother was hesitant of these strangers, but the children of the tribe, including Zitkala-Sa, were curious of these visitors. Zitkala-Sa had a brother, Dawe'e who had gone with these missionaries to receive an Eastern education. The missionaries, thus, were curious about recruiting his sister, Zitkala-Sa, to also receive this education. Against her mother's wishes, Zitkala-Sa desired to explore the beautiful East lands. Zitkala Sa's mother understood the other children's influence on Zitkala-Sa in regards to the "white man's lies." (Bonnin, 41) She tried to encourage her daughter not to go by saying, "Don't believe a word they say! Their words are sweet, but, my child, their deeds are bitter." (Bonnin, 41) Though Zitkala-Sa did not want to disrespect her mother's wishes, she was told of 'the great tree where grew red, red apples; and how we could reach out our hands and pick all the red apples we could eat." As a child of 8 years, she had never tasted many apples and was very excited to roam these fields of apples. She didn't understand how her mother could be so negative towards these people. 8 year old Zitkala-Sa wanted apples, she wanted adventure. The interpreter for the missionaries assured the young girl and her mother, "Yes, little girl, the nice red apples are for those who pick them; and you will have a ride on the iron horse if you go with these good people." (Bonnin, 42) The innocent naïve Zitkala-Sa was insistent to go to the wonderful Eastern land to experience the unknown education of the palefaces. The young Zitkala-Sa had no idea what her adventure would entail, leaving her mother for a future paleface education, while having natural instincts, "I was as frightened and bewildered as the captured young of a wild creature." (Bonnin, 45) "By using the apple as a symbol of the Western tradition, Zitkala-Sa subverts the idea that the missionaries were "saving the Indians"; instead, she enacts a reverse temptation wherein the missionaries tempt her with forbidden fruit, causing her to fall out of the coherent oral culture of her mother into the "white man's" world of knowledge, a world too often promising her "white men's lies"—knowledge as delusion." (Stanley, 66)

=== The School Days of an Indian Girl ===
==== The Land of Red Apples ====
Zitkala-Sa and seven other Dakota children head East with the missionaries by choice. They are impatient to begin the journey to the "Red Apple Country" where they "dream of roaming freely and happily". They expect a great deal of enjoyment from their ride on the iron horse (train) but are disturbed and troubled by the staring palefaces. Zitkala-Sa resents being watched and notes the paleface mother does not reprimand her children for their "rude curiosity" and pointing, which makes her embarrassed and on the verge of tears.

She remembers seeing a telegraph pole, which was being erected by palefaces in her home land. Her thoughts on the telegraph pole help her forget her surroundings, until a missionary calls her name and tosses candies to her and other children which amuses them. Though her trip on the iron horse lasts several days, Zitkala-Sa does not remember any luncheons.

They reach the school grounds at night. Her body trembles with fear and she stays close to the wall upon entering. As she quietly plans an escape, a paleface woman picks her up and tosses her in the air excitedly. Young Zitkala-Sa is both "frightened and insulted", because her mother never treated her in such a way. The thought of her mother makes her cry aloud. The palefaces misunderstand her tears and sit her at a table with food. An older Dakota child tells her to hold her tears until she is alone at night. She pleads for her mother, brother and aunt.

From the table, the children are taken upstairs to a room lined with narrow beds. Zitkala-Sa sleeps with a tall girl, because she speaks her native tongue which soothes her. Zitkala-Sa notes she has "arrived in the wonderful land of rosy skies", but she is not as happy as she wishes. Her tears are "left to dry themselves in streaks" because her mother and aunt are not there to wipe them away.

==== The Cutting of My Long Hair ====
In the vignette, "The Cutting of my Long Hair", Zitkala-Sa looks at the physical differences between herself and the "palefaces" running the school. In the beginning of the vignette she lines up with the other American Indian children. They are about to eat breakfast, but must first pray, a new concept for her.

As everyone begins, Judéwin, a girl who knows little English, frightens young Zitkala-Sa by announcing a paleface woman will cut their hair. Zitkala-Sa feels uncomfortable and cries. She is aware of her new tight-fitting clothes and uncomfortable shoes, far different from her usual dress and moccasins. After eating and getting into line, she remembers her mother said how only cowards have their hair cut from them, so she quietly slips away.

Finding refuge in a dark room, Zitkala-Sa hides under a bed but soon hears voices calling her name. The women find her and she starts crying, fearful of what will happen next. They strap the frightened girl down and after feeling the cold blade on her neck they slice off her long beautiful hair. The young girl cries for her mother, but soon remembers she is not there to comfort her.

==== The Snow Episode ====
One day while playing in snowdrifts, Zitkala-Sa and her friends were told not to fall face first into the snow. Forgetting their orders, they continued to do it when a woman yelled at them from the school and told them to come inside. Judewin, the only one of the three girls who could speak English, told Zitkala-Sa and Thowin that when the "pale face" looks into their eyes and talks loudly they must wait until she stops and then say the word "no". Thowin was called into the office first. The other two waited and listened outside of the door. After listening a bit, Judewin realized she taught the girls the wrong reply. They heard Thowin say no and then she was spanked. The woman asked Thowin again if she was going to obey her the next time and Thowin replied no. The woman continued to whip her until she asked Thowin if she was going to fall in the snow again. Thowin replied no and the woman then let her out of the office. Zitkala-Sa figured she must have realized this method was not working so she left the three in the room alone. These misunderstandings continued frequently for the next couple seasons. Zitkala-Sa learned some English and became mischievous. Once when she disregarded a rule she was sent to the kitchen to mash turnips. She hated the turnips and their smell so she smashed them in their jar to a pulp. She mashed them so hard that the bottom of the glass jar they were in broke. When someone came to stop her, they lifted the jar and the bottom and all of its contents spilled onto the floor. No turnips were served for dinner that night.

==== The Devil ====
In a second vignette, "The Devil", young Zitkala-Sa describes a new enemy. She was taught to fear no one but the palefaces show her a detailed picture of the Devil, with horns and a slithery tail, and the image frightens her deeply. The palefaces told her "I torture little girls who disobey school regulations".

Zitkala-Sa then describes a dream where she sees her mother and an old woman in a cottage, when the Devil bursts in and chases her. She screams out but the old woman and her mother do not hear her screaming and ignore her. Later, Zitkala-Sa scribbles over the picture, leaving a hole where the image had been.

==== Iron Routine ====
Every morning in the winter the school children would be woken up at 6:30 by a loud bell. They only had a short while to get ready until it was time for roll call which was announced by a little bell. It did not matter if the children were sick or not, they had to be down for roll call or they would be marked tardy. Zitkala-Sa remembers the time when she was sick and did not want to come down for roll call but had to. There was a little girl who was also sick and dying and one of the school teachers sat by her bedside with a cool rag and put it on her hands and feet but it made no difference, the little girl died. Zitkala-Sa hated this time and everything about it. She hated the teachers who did not care when they were sick, she hated the medicine the teachers gave her, and she hated the pencils that moved across the paper that marked her tardy. When she would feel better, she forgot her hatred and began to smile again. But she still remembers these times the most.

=== The Trial Path ===
This section tells the story of the author's grandparents, as told to her by her grandmother. Her grandfather was a young man when he accidentally killed his best friend. As punishment, he is forced to break a wild pony, which he does successfully. Zitkala-Sa's grandmother reports that the pony survived until her husband died, at which time it was killed.
