= John Welsh (diplomat) =

American diplomat (1805-1886)

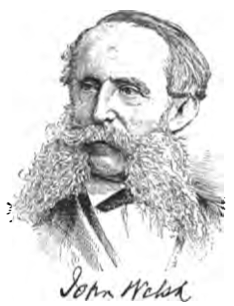
- Born: November 9, 1805; Philadelphia, Pennsylvania, U.S.
- Died: April 19, 1886 (aged 80); Philadelphia, Pennsylvania, U.S.
- Resting place: Laurel Hill Cemetery, Philadelphia, Pennsylvania, U.S.

John Welsh (November 9, 1805 – April 19, 1886) was an American merchant and diplomat who served as United States Minister to the Court of St. James's from 1877 to 1879.

== Biography ==
Welsh was born in Philadelphia on November 8, 1805. His ancestors were early Swedish and English settlers in America. His father, also named John Welsh, moved from Delaware to Philadelphia in 1786, and became a prominent merchant in that city.

His father trained John and his brothers Samuel and William to mercantile life, and gradually introduced them to his business. John was the youngest child. He received a good preparatory education, including a classical course, and began in the mercantile business at a very early age. He formed a partnership with his brothers, Samuel and William, and for more than half a century the firm of S. & W. Welsh, and later S. & J. Welsh, was among the leading commission houses in Philadelphia, and known all over the country.

Welsh became interested in public affairs and the charitable institutions of Philadelphia. During the last twenty-five years of his life he was an influential leader in most of the public improvement initiatives in the community. He was a vestryman in St. Peter's Protestant Episcopal Church for forty-two years, and was treasurer of the fund of that denomination for the support of the episcopate. He took an active interest in founding the Episcopal hospital, he made himself responsible for the entire building fund amounting to $331,000, of which he personally contributed $41,000. He was one of the founders and became president of an association which raised a fund for the benefit of merchants who met with reverses in business.

He was elected to the American Philosophical Society in 1867.

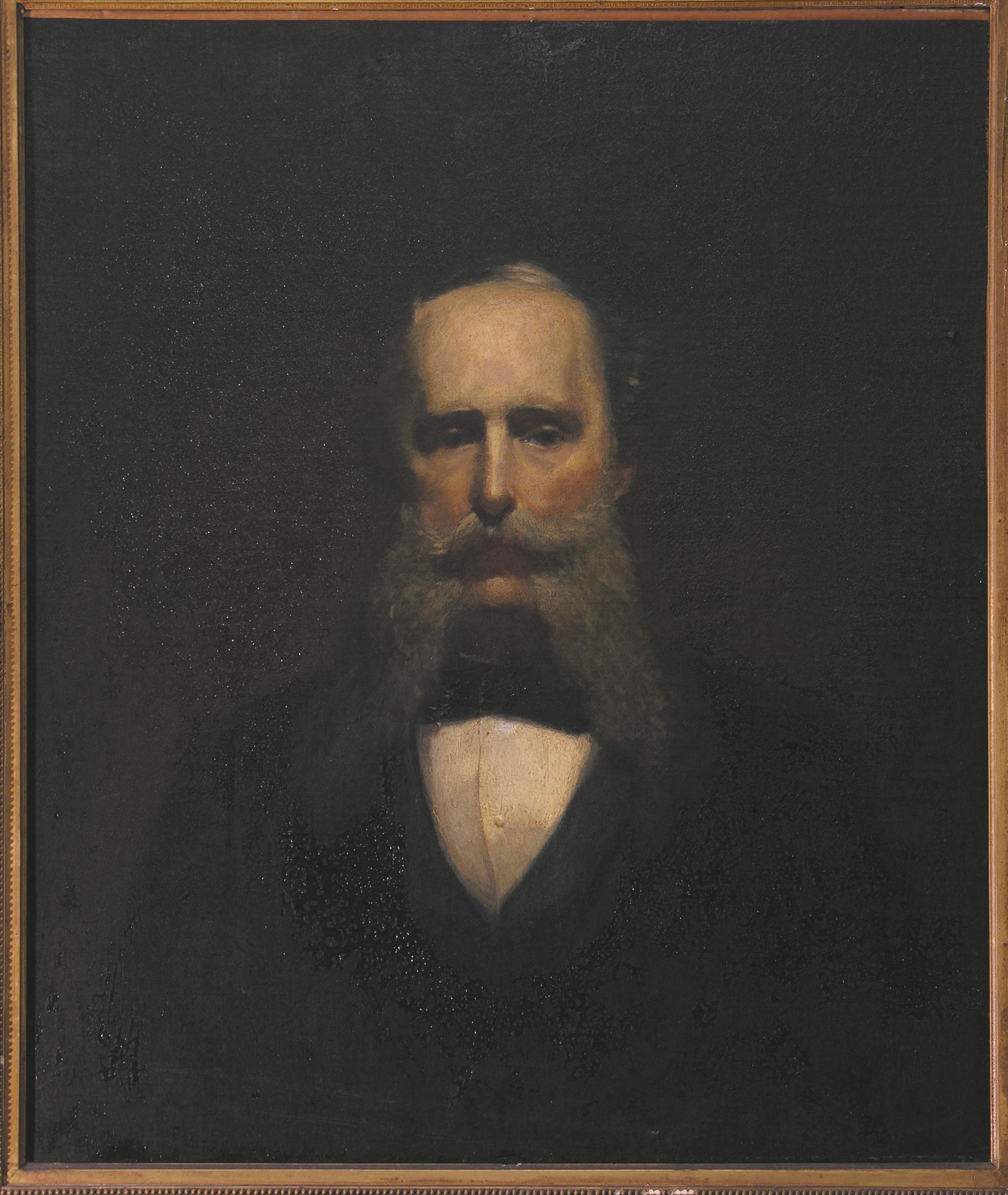
Portrait painted by his son, Herbert, from the collection of Andrew Imbrie Dayton

In 1864, Welsh was chairman of the executive committee of the great Sanitary Fair held in Logan Square, Philadelphia, which raised $1,500,000 in money and supplies for the promotion of the health and comfort of soldiers and sailors in the United States Army and Navy. He distinguished himself as chairman of the board of finances of the Centennial Exhibition of 1876, which position he held from the time of the creation of the board by act of congress in 1873, until the adjustment of all the accounts in 1877. He comprehended its importance and possessed the insight to appreciate its moral and material significance. After the exhibition closed, the board of directors, in recognition of his services, voted him a gold medal, and a number of prominent persons presented him $50,000 as "a perpetual commemoration of the sincere gratitude of the citizens of Philadelphia." With this fund, he founded the John Welsh chair of history and English literature in the University of Pennsylvania.

On October 30, 1877, President Rutherford B. Hayes appointed Welsh minister to the United Kingdom, which he held until his resignation, August 31, 1879. He was instrumental in securing the release of a number of Fenian prisoners. As the representative of the United States, he paid to the British government $5,500,000 awarded by the Halifax Fisheries Commission.

Upon his return home, he passed the remainder of his life in retirement. For 20 years he was a trustee of the University of Pennsylvania, and during that period contributed $80,000 to its endowment fund. He also gave $10,000 to the Philadelphia Academy of Natural Sciences. He was made Knight-Commander of the Order of St. Olaf by the king of Sweden, and Commander of the Order of the Rising Sun by the Emperor of Japan, and Grand Officer of the Order of Nizan Iftakan by the bey of Tunis. The degree of LL.D. was conferred upon him by the University of Pennsylvania in 1878, and by Washington and Lee University in 1880. He died in Philadelphia on April 19, 1886, and was interred at Laurel Hill Cemetery.

== Family ==
His son, Herbert Welsh, was prominent as a civil service reformer and Indian rights activist.

== Legacy ==
The John Welsh Memorial Fountain was built in Fairmount Park to honor Welsh's work as chairman of the board of finance for the Centennial Exposition.

Diplomatic posts
Preceded by Edwards Pierrepont	U.S. Minister to Great Britain; 1877 – 1879	Succeeded by James Russell Lowell
