= Old Indian Legends =

First edition (publ. Ginn & Co. Athenaeum Press)

Old Indian Legends is a collection of Sioux stories retold by the Yankton Dakota writer Zitkala-Sa and published in 1901. Concerned about the effect of assimilation on the tribe's children, she wanted to preserve the traditional stories of her people. According to the University of Virginia Library Electronic Text Center, there are 14 legends which comprise this book.

The first five legends have an unlucky trickster character, a spider fairy named Iktomi.

== The Iktomi stories ==
=== Iktomi and the Ducks ===
Iktomi befriends a group of dancing ducks and tricks them by playing music and having them dance in a way in which they twist their necks and break them, which kills the ducks. He then takes the ducks back to his teepee and cooks them until he hears a tree cracking in the wind and goes to investigate. He breaks the limb that cracks but gets stuck by it, and a group of wolves comes along and eats his feast.

=== Iktomi’s Blanket ===
Iktomi is hungry and needs food because the wolf took the ducks. He prays to Inyan, whom he refers to as the great-grandfather, to bless him with meat. Iktomi offers Inyan his blanket. Upon returning from prayer, Iktomi comes across a wounded deer and believes his prayer was answered. Iktomi builds a fire and cooks the deer meat, but while doing so he grows cold. Realizing he has nothing to put on for warmth, he decides to go back to retrieve the blanket that he gave to Inyan. Upon return to his teepee, he sees that his meat has been eaten and that his fire is out. Iktomi realizes that he should have eaten the meat first before going to retrieve his blanket.

=== Iktomi and the Muskrat ===
Iktomi is preparing some fish when he hears a voice calling him "friend". He looks around and sees a muskrat by his feet. The muskrat asks Iktomi if he will share his fish, and Iktomi suggests that they race for the fish and that if the muskrat wins, they will share it. The muskrat tells Iktomi that he cannot race, but Iktomi offers to strap a heavy rock around his waist to give the muskrat a fair chance. The muskrat agrees and they head off in opposite directions so that they can race back to the fish. The muskrat swims across the lake and wins the race, and tells Iktomi he should have just shared in the first place.

=== Iktomi and the Coyote ===
Iktomi is walking across a prairie when he comes across a coyote lying on the ground. He believes the coyote is dead even though it is still warm. Iktomi decides to take the coyote back to his teepee to cook. But the coyote is alive, and when Iktomi arrives at his place, he builds a fire and throws the coyote into the fire. The coyote escapes the fire and tells Iktomi that he had better make sure his prey is dead before preparing the meal.

=== Iktomi and the Fawn ===
Iktomi comes across a beautiful peacock in a tree and wishes to be as beautiful as the peacock. He begs the peacock to give him wonderful feathers, so the peacock magically transforms Iktomi into a peacock. The only condition is that Iktomi may not try to fly. Being stubborn, Iktomi tries to fly but fails and gets transformed back into a human being. Next Iktomi comes across an arrow and is transformed into it, but again fails to follow one rule and returns to normal. Finally, he comes across a fawn and asks the fawn to give him spots similar to his. In order to get the spots, Iktomi has to be buried in a hole and burned with dried grass, sticks, and cedar ember. The fawn agrees to help Iktomi, and Iktomi lies down in the hole and blue smoke rises, but Iktomi climbs out of the fire before burning, and does not get the brown spots he desired.
