= The Stonewall Chorale =

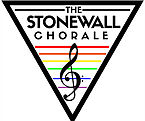

Background information
- Origin: New York City, New York, United States
- Genres: Classical, Art music, Great American Songbook
- Years active: 1977–present
- Website: stonewallchorale.org

The Stonewall Chorale, founded in New York City in 1977, is America's first LGBTQIA chorus. The Chorale, a four-part mixed chorus of approximately 60 members, annually performs three subscription concerts at various venues in New York City. Its repertoire ranges from great classical works to contemporary pieces by cutting edge composers like Ricky Ian Gordon, Eric Whitacre, Chris DeBlasio, Jaakko Mäntyjärvi, and Meredith Monk.

== Details ==
The Stonewall Chorale regularly participates in community service events such as the Lesbian, Gay, Bisexual & Transgender Community Center Annual Garden Party, World AIDS Day and Kristallnacht commemorations, holiday caroling, and Gay Pride celebrations. Stonewall also performs with various groups that provide entertainment in hospitals throughout the NYC metropolitan area.

Stonewall Chorale Advisory Board members include Gerald Busby, Beth Clayton, John Corigliano, Meredith Monk, Marni Nixon, Kirk Nurock, Patricia Racette, Ned Rorem, Jerry Rubino, Liz Smith, and Eric Whitacre.

Following a national search, Nicholas Sienkiewicz was appointed artistic director in 2026, beginning his tenure with The Stonewall Chorale’s 50th anniversary season.

== History ==
The Stonewall Chorale originated in December 1977 as the Gotham Male Chorus, founded by conductor Donald Rock, who wanted a chorus that would "dig music as well as each other." In 1979, women joined Gotham Male Chorus for the first time, and the name was changed to Stonewall Chorale, the nation's first lesbian and gay mixed-voice chorus. It was a catalyst for the creation of solidarity and commonality among GLBTQ individuals in New York City.

In September 1983 at Lincoln Center, the Chorale opened the first gay and lesbian choral festival named "Come Out! and Sing Together" (aka COAST), organized and sponsored by GALA Choruses (Gay and Lesbian Association of Choruses), now an international organization with more than 150 member choruses.

In 1985 the Stonewall Chorale officially became a tax exempt corporation.

In 1986 William Pflugradt became the conductor of the Stonewall Chorale.

In 1988 the Chorale premiered composer Louis Weingarden's cantata "Evening Liturgy of Consolation", an AIDS memorial work.

In 1991 Nancy Vang began directing the Chorale. In December 1991 former Chorale director Bill Pflugradt died of AIDS, and the choir performed at his memorial service in January 1992.

In 1995 the Stonewall Chorale performed at Carnegie Hall in a concert hosted by the New York City Gay Men's Chorus.

In 1996, the Chorale received a $5,000 Community Arts Project Award from Lincoln Center for the Performing Arts, Inc. These grants are awarded annually to nine community performing arts organizations based on their quality of musical performance, program creativity, and ongoing commitment to professionalism. This grant subsidized a concert at Alice Tully Hall on February 22, 1997, which honored the music and pedagogy of Nadia Boulanger. The program also resulted in a generous grant of $2,000 received from the Florence Gould Foundation, whose purpose is to promote French culture in the United States.

In 2002, the Chorale welcomed Cynthia Powell as its conductor and artistic director. Under her direction, the Chorale has performed major works by Handel, Mozart, Orff, Vivaldi, Faure, Vaughan Williams, Poulenc, Stravinsky, and Britten to capacity audiences. The Chorale commissioned and premiered "love notes" by Gerald Busby, presented the choral premiere of Meredith Monk's Book of Days at Merkin Hall, performed Monk's Ascension Variations at the Guggenheim Museum, and her Songs of Ascension at the Brooklyn Academy of Music. In January 2012 the Chorale performed at Carnegie Hall in a benefit for the American Cancer Society, alongside special guests Julie Andrews and Donald Trump.

In 2010, artistic director Cynthia Powell was featured as one of GO magazine's "Women at the Helm".

In 2012, The Fund for Creative Communities from the Lower Manhattan Cultural Council awarded a grant to the Stonewall Chorale. The Fund for Creative Communities During that same year the Chorale's artistic director Cynthia Powell appeared on WQXR Radio's show "The Choral Mix" discussing the choir's 36th season.

== Notable guest artists ==
- Tovah Feldshuh
- Flutronix
- Isle of Klezbos
- Liza Minnelli
- Debra Monk
- Marni Nixon
- Theo Bleckmann

== Notable performances ==
- June 6, 2017: Sang Carl Orff's "Carmina Burana" as opener for The Washington Square Music Festival.
- August 3, 2016: Sang the U.S. National Anthem "The Star-Spangled Banner" for a New York Empire World TeamTennis match at the USTA Billie Jean King National Tennis Center.
- June 13, 2016: Sang Cyndi Lauper's "True Colors" at a benefit for The Trevor Project in the wake of the Orlando nightclub shooting.
- November 2015: Sang "Love Changes Everything" for a flashmob marriage proposal at Lincoln Center.
- June 26, 2013: Sang "America (My Country, 'Tis of Thee)" at rally in front of the Stonewall Inn celebrating the US Supreme Court ruling on United States v. Windsor overturning parts of the Defense of Marriage Act.
- October 21–25, 2009: Sang as part of larger chorus in Meredith Monk's "Songs of Ascension" at the Brooklyn Academy of Music.
- March 5, 2009: Sang as part of larger chorus in Meredith Monk's "Ascension Variations" at the Solomon R. Guggenheim Museum.
- September 12, 1983: Sang at Lincoln Center's Alice Tully Hall as part of "Come Out and Sing Together: the first national gay choral festival".
