= Mináǧi kiŋ dowáŋ =

Screen opera based on life of Zitkála-Šá

Mináǧi kiŋ dowáŋ: A Zitkála-Šá Opera
- Title card
- Directed by: Sequoia Hauck
- Produced by: Kelly Turpin (An Opera Theater)
- Edited by: Courtney Cochran
- Music by: Lyz Jaakola (composer); Hannah Johnson (librettist)
- Production company: An Opera Theater
- Release date: October 12, 2022
- Running time: 30 minutes
- Country: United States
- Languages: Dakota; English

Mináǧi kiŋ dowáŋ: A Zitkála-Šá Opera ('My Spirit Sings') is a 2022 operatic film about the life and work of Yankton Dakota author and activist Zitkála-Šá. It is considered by some to be the first opera that uses Dakota language. The opera was composed by Lyz Jaakola (Fond du Lac Anishinaabe), directed by Sequoia Hauck (Anishinaabe, Hupa), and produced by Kelly Turpin of An Opera Theater (AOT). Jaysalynn Western Boy is one of four actors to play Zitkála-Šá. It premiered October 12, 2022 at Water Works Park in Minneapolis, Minnesota.

== Plot ==
The opera follows pivotal moments in Zitkála-Šá's life, "as much as we could fit in 30 minutes." Zitkála-Šá is depicted at four ages.

== Production ==
=== Development ===
Mináǧi kiŋ dowáŋ was composed and filmed by an all-Indigenous crew, primarily made up of women. The crew eliminated deadlines, interviewed Zitkála-Šá's descendants, and included Native ceremonies in meetings to decolonize the process. Production lasted two years.

About one-third of the libretto is in the Dakota language. It is considered the first opera with Dakota lyrics, although composer Jaakola notes: "I hesitate to say it's the first — [because] how are you defining opera? Musical storytelling? Well, the Dakota people have been doing that for millennia."

Jaakola was hesitant to work on the project until she was told it would be produced by an all-Indigenous cast and crew. Librettist Hannah Johnson captured Zitkála-Šá's poetic style. The music was rewritten after translation into Dakota because Dakota "doesn’t sing like English!"

Šišóka Dúta (Sisseton Wahpeton Oyate) of the University of Minnesota Dakota language program served as the lead translator of English to Dakota.

Artist Moira Villiard (Fond du Lac tribe) animated scenes for the film version of the opera.

=== Filming ===
The opera was filmed on-location around Minnesota, including locations in Prairie Island Indian Community. Filming took place in the summer months of 2022.

== Cast ==
- Jaysalynn Western Boy (Prairie Island Indian Community Mdewakanton)
- Lorna "Emmy" Her Many Horses (Siċaŋġu and Oglala Lakota, from the Rosebud Sioux Tribe), 30-year-old Zitkála-Šá
- Jagger Ripley-Jaakola (Arikara/Anishinaabe/Santee descendant)
- Adrienne Zimiga-January (Oglala Lakota), mature Zitkála-Šá

== Release ==
The film debuted at a free screening in Water Works Park, Minneapolis, in October 12, 2022. Following the debut were several free live performances at Indigenous Roots Cultural Center in Saint Paul, Minnesota. Live performances were accompanied by English translation closed captions and American Sign Language interpretation. The film went on tour May 2023 with screenings at American Indian Magnet School, Minneapolis, Minnesota; Prairie Island Indian Community, Minnesota; Racing Magpie, Rapid City, South Dakota; Oglala Lakota ArtSpace, Pine Ridge, South Dakota; and Yankton Reservation, South Dakota.

The initial release was accompanied by promotional literature such as coloring pages and short biographies featuring Zitkála-Šá. A behind the scenes production documentary by director Sequoia Hauck called "Making a Zitkála-Šá Opera" was released following wider film screenings.

== See also ==
- The Sun Dance Opera — The first opera by a Dakota person
