= Herbert Welsh =

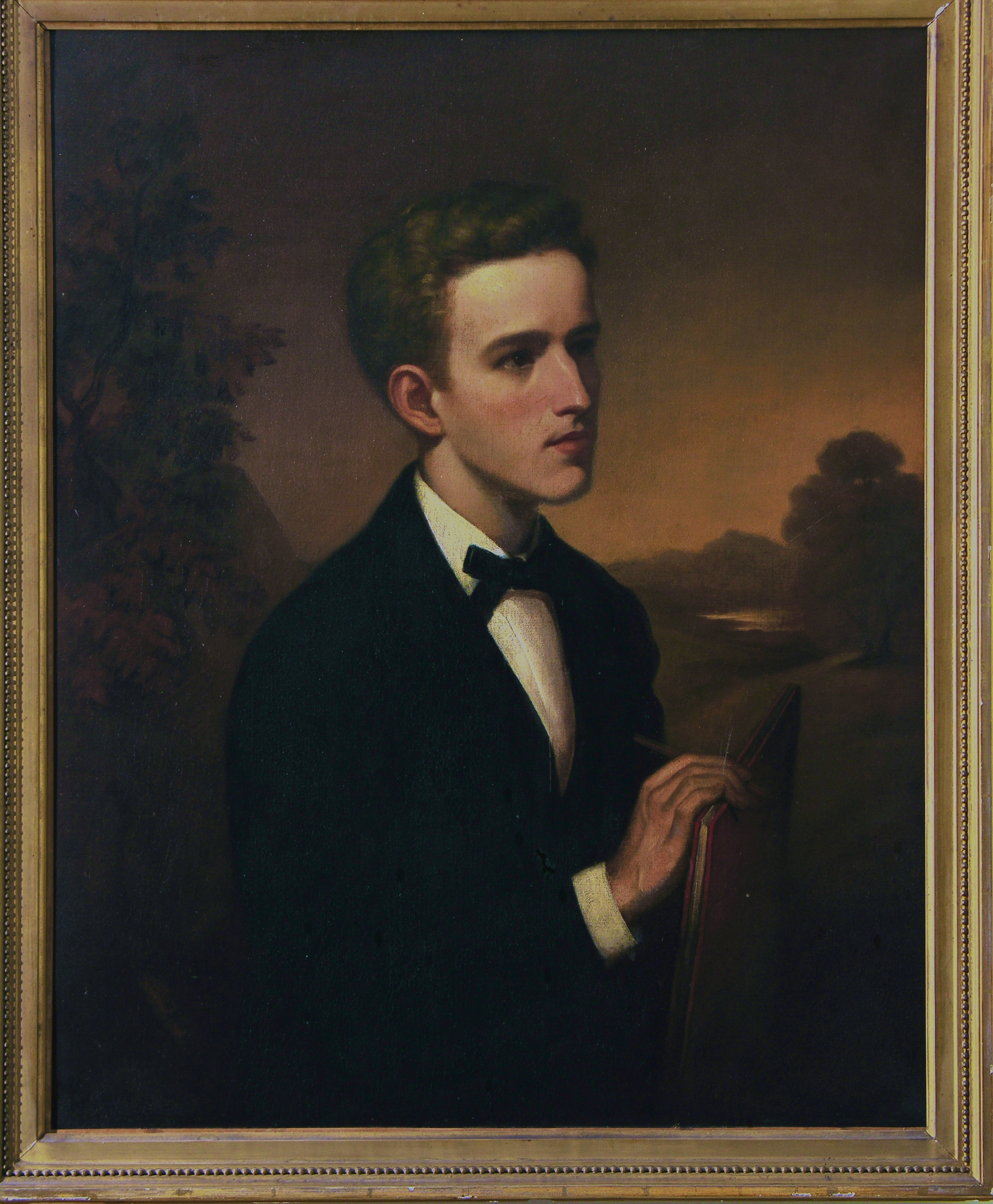
- Herbert Welsh
- Born: 4 December 1851; Philadelphia, Pennsylvania
- Died: 28 June 1941; Montpelier, Vermont
- Known for: advocate for the rights of Native Americans
- Spouse: Fanny Frazer

Herbert Welsh (1851–1941) was a United States political reformer and worker for the welfare of the indigenous peoples of North America.

== Biography ==
Herbert Welsh was born in Philadelphia, the youngest of eight children of John Welsh, a prosperous merchant and philanthropist. He was educated at the Episcopal Academy in Philadelphia and graduated from the University of Pennsylvania (1871), and then studied art at the Pennsylvania Academy of Fine Arts in Philadelphia. In May 1873, he sailed to Paris to study in the studio of Léon Bonnat, of Paris. In the spring of 1874 he returned to Philadelphia and for a period worked as an artist.

Welsh became known as an earnest advocate for the rights of Native Americans, a calling triggered by a visit to the Sioux Reservation in 1882. In 1883, his actions resulted in the founding of the Indian Rights Association in Philadelphia, and he served as its corresponding secretary for 34 years and its president for 11 years. Over the next 30 plus years, he urged the public and the United States Congress to provide education for Indian children, holding of lands in severalty by the Indians (also known as Allotment, which would have disastrous outcomes for Native communities under the Dawes Act), and to extend civil law to their reservations.

He was also prominent in state politics as a reformer, one of the leaders of the movement in 1890 against political corruption and boss rule in Pennsylvania, which resulted in the defeat of George W. Delamater and the election of Robert E. Pattison for governor of Pennsylvania in that year's election. He was president of the Civil Service Reform Association of Pennsylvania, member of the executive committee of the National Civil Service Reform League, and, beginning in 1895 to 1904 was editor of City and State, a weekly devoted to the interests of good government. In January 1894, Welsh became chair of the committee to plan the National Municipal League at a meeting of civil reformers held in Philadelphia, including Teddy Roosevelt, Louis Brandeis, and Frederick Law Olmsted. This organization evolved into the National Civic League, active today. In 1884, he was elected as a member to the American Philosophical Society.

He was well known as a lecturer on the problems of indigenous peoples, civil service reform, and municipal government, and contributed articles on these topics to magazines. In 1909, following timber cutting on Mt. Sunapee in New Hampshire near his summer home, Welsh led the effort to raise funds to conserve the mountain lands. In 1911, those funds provided for the Society for the Protection of New Hampshire Forests to purchase 656 acres on the north slopes. Welsh led the Sunapee Chapter of SPNHF for more than 20 years, eventually expanding the land holding to 1185 acres, which became the bulk of Mount Sunapee State Park, For his health, beginning in 1915, Welsh began to walk from his home in Philadelphia to Sunapee, New Hampshire in June, a trek of roughly 400 miles, taking about one month and continued until 1929 at age 78. Welsh died on June 28, 1941, in Montpelier, Vermont.

== Works ==
- Four Weeks Among Some of the Sioux Tribes in 1882
- Civilization Among the Sioux Indians
- A Visit to the Navajo, Pueblo, and Hualapai Indians of New Mexico and Arizona in 1884
- Allotment of Lands - Defense of the Dawes Indian Severalty Bill (1887)
- The Other Man's Country (1900), a criticism of the Government's Philippine policy.
- The Action of the Interior Department in Forcing the Standing Rock Indians to Lease Their Lands to Cattle Syndicates, Philadelphia: The Indian Rights Association 1902.
