= Indian Rights Association =

Social activist group

The Indian Rights Association (IRA) was a social activist group dedicated to the well-being and acculturation of Native Americans in the United States. Founded by non-Indians in Philadelphia in 1882, the group was highly influential in American Indian policy through the 1930s and remained an organization until 1994. The organization's initial objective was to "bring about the complete civilization of the Indians and their admission to citizenship."

The organization was founded in 1883 by Herbert Welsh and Henry Spackman Pancoast after they traveled with an Episcopal mission to the Dakota Territory in 1882 and spent four weeks with the Sioux agencies. In 1884 they opened an additional office in Washington, D.C., to act as a legislative lobby and liaison with the Board of Indian Commissioners and the Board of Indian Affairs. The IRA also opened an early office in Boston, Massachusetts. The management of early Indian Rights Association's programs fell almost entirely to five men, all of whom had lengthy careers with the IRA: Herbert Welsh, Matthew Sniffen, and Lawrence E. Lindley, active in Philadelphia; and Charles C. Painter and Samuel M. Brosius, agents and lobbyists in Washington, D.C.

In addition to efforts on policy development and congressional lobbying, the Indian Rights Association monitored the actions of Bureau of Indian Affairs agents and observed Native American living conditions and health care needs through correspondence and trips to reservations and settlements. They also sponsored speaking tours for activists and Indian representatives to inform the public about native issues. The Unitarian minister and journalist Jonathan Baxter Harrison was an influential observer, publishing several books and articles detailing his findings in the late 1880s.

== The Indian Rights Association in British Columbia ==
In 1909, a different organization of the same name formed in British Columbia, Canada. The Indian Rights Association in BC was a coalition of Indigenous leaders fighting to protect Aboriginal titles.

== Publications ==
- Harrison, Jonathan Baxter. The latest studies on Indian reservations, Philadelphia: The Indian Rights Association 1887.
- Harrison, Jonathan Baxter. The colleges and the Indians, and the Indian Rights Association, Philadelphia: The Indian Rights Association 1888.
- Pancoast, Henry Spackman. The Indian Before the Law, Philadelphia: The Indian Rights Association 1884.
- Welsh, Herbert. The Action of the Interior Department in Forcing the Standing Rock Indians to Lease Their Lands to Cattle Syndicates, Philadelphia: The Indian Rights Association 1902.
