= Calum Gourlay =

Scottish jazz bassist, composer, and band leader

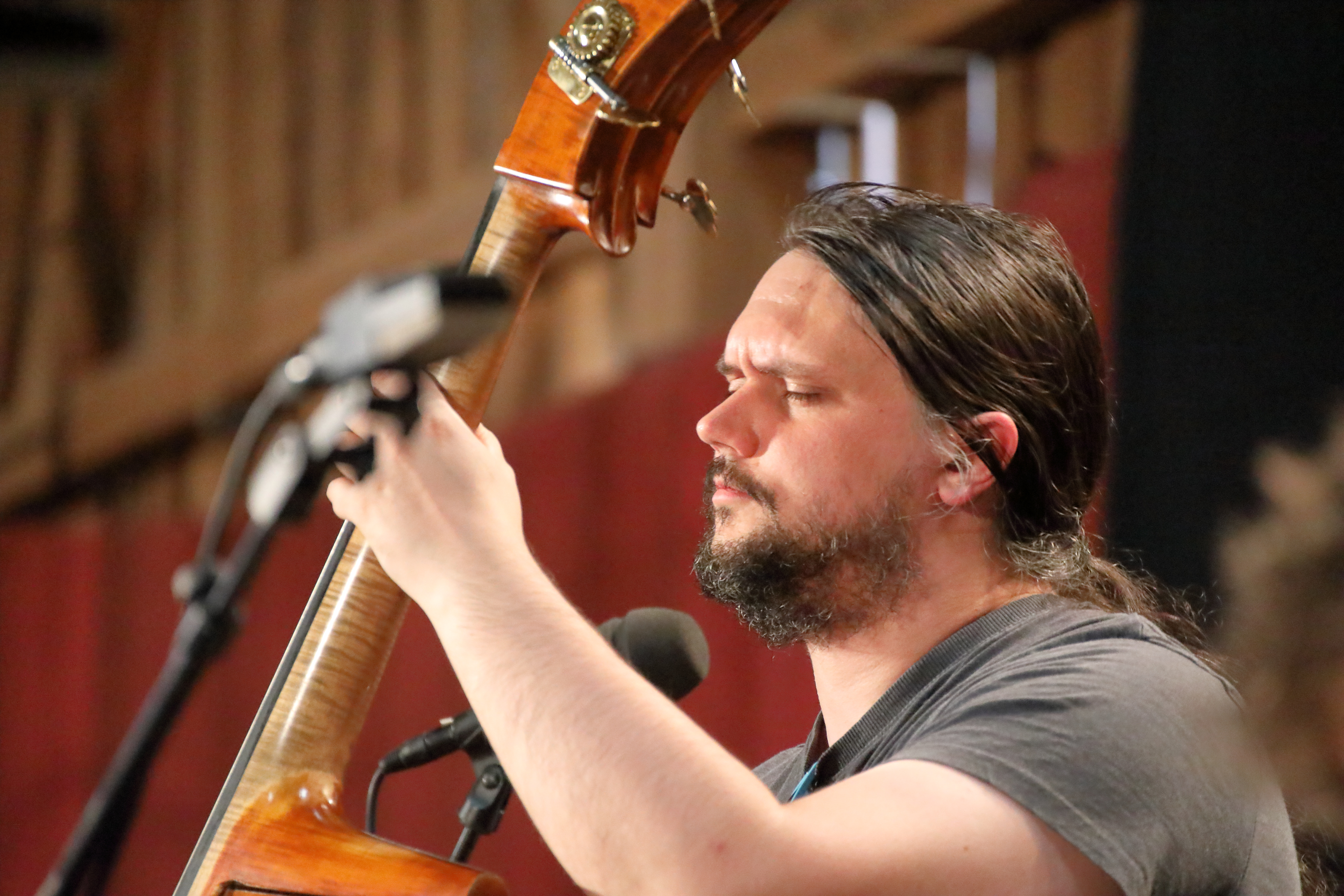

Background information
- Born: Glasgow, Scotland
- Genres: Jazz
- Occupation: Musician
- Instrument: Double bass
- Years active: 2004–present
- Website: calumgourlay.com

Calum Gourlay is a Scottish jazz bassist, composer, and band leader.

== Career ==
The son of a music teacher, Gourlay grew up in Glasgow. At the age of ten he began learning the cello, then four years later started playing double bass. He heard Scottish jazz musicians at workshops taught by his father on Saturday mornings. He moved from Glasgow to Dunfermline, participating in the Fife Youth Jazz Orchestra and the Strathclyde Youth Jazz Orchestra. He played in a youth band led by Tommy Smith until 2004 when he traveled to London to attend the Royal Academy of Music. At the school he met three people who would become bandmates: Trish Clowes, Kit Downes, and Freddie Gavita. Gourlay has taught at the Royal Academy and Trinity Laban Conservatoire of Music and Dance

== Discography ==
=== As leader ===
- Live at the Ridgeway (2015)
- New Ears Quartet (Ubuntu Music, 2019)

=== As sideman ===
With Kit Downes

- Golden (Basho, 2009)
- Quiet Tiger (Basho, 2011)
- Light from Old Stars (Basho, 2013)

With Tommy Smith and the Scottish National Jazz Orchestra

- American Adventure (Spartacus, 2013)
- Embodying the Light (Spartacus, 2017)
- Sweet Sister Suite by Kenny Wheeler (Spartacus, 2018)

With others

- Arild Andersen, Celebration (ECM, 2012)
- Richard Rodney Bennett, Saxophone Concerto/Reflections On a 16th Century Tune (BBC, 2018)
- Kurt Elling, Passion World (Concord Jazz, 2015)
- Makoto Ozone, Jeunehomme: Piano Concerto No. 9 (Spartacus, 2017)
- Colin Steele, Joni (Marina, 2020)
- Anthony Strong, Stepping Out (Naive, 2013)
