= William F. Hanson =

American composer and music teacher

William Frederick Hanson
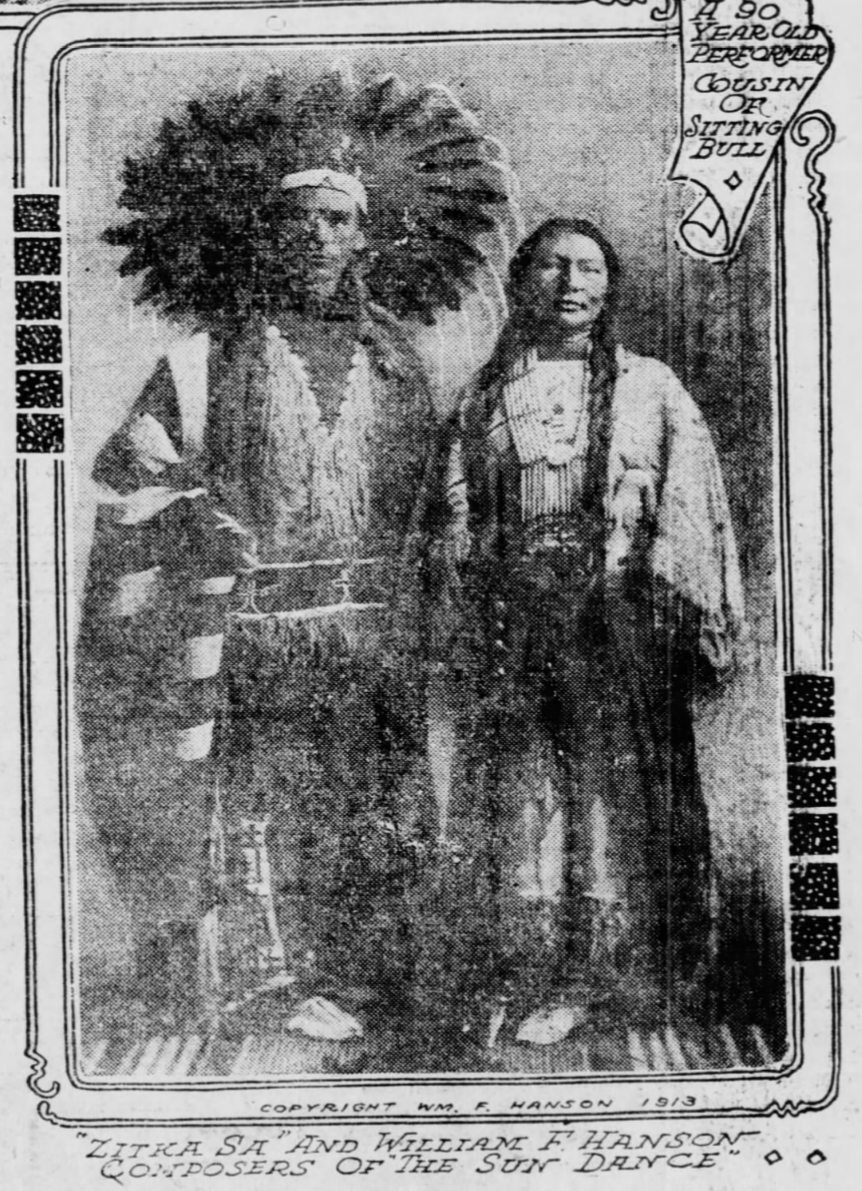
- Zitkala-Sa and William F. Hanson in 1913.
- Born: October 23, 1887} Vernal, Utah
- Died: June 22, 1969 (aged 81); Provo, Utah

William Frederick Hanson (October 23, 1887 – June 22, 1969) was an American composer and music teacher who served as professor of music at Brigham Young University who specialized in Native American music. He studied, composed, and taught music. He is most well known for working with Zitkala-Sa on The Sun Dance Opera, an opera based on the sacred ritual of the Lakota Sun Dance.

== Biography ==
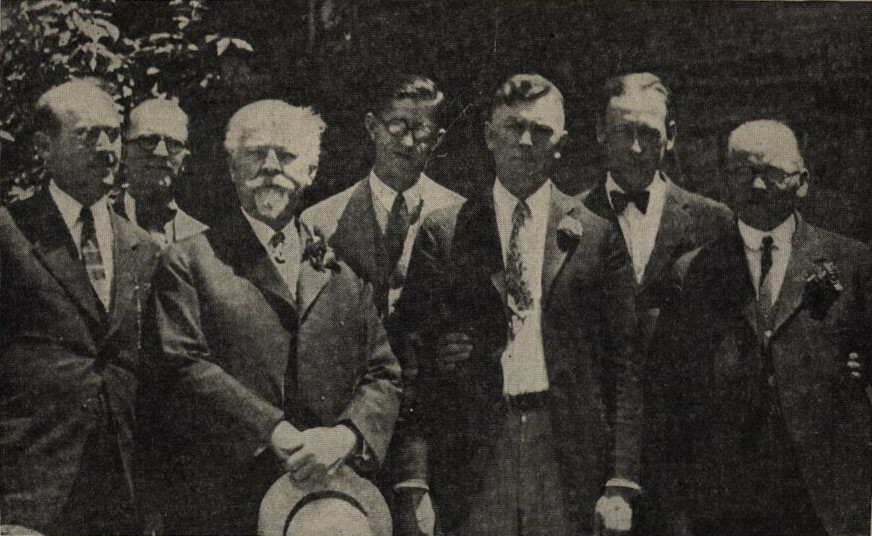
Hanson (far left) in 1927 during a visit to BYU from Carl Busch, with other members of the music faculty (Leroy Robertson is in the center behind Busch)

Hanson was born in Vernal, Utah. He grew up in Utah near the Sioux and the Utes of the White Rocks and Fort Duchesne, with whom he became friends. He earned his bachelor's and master's degrees at Brigham Young University (BYU) and then attended the Chicago Music College and Columbia University. He returned to Provo to teach at BYU in 1924 and was on the faculty for thirty-three years. He was head of the department of music education for one year. Later, he was an instructor of music at Uintah academy. He lived with the Utes on the Uintah reservation and he would attend their religious festivities. In all, he spent at least twenty years with Native Americans, especially the Utes.

Hanson's main passions in life were music and learning about Native American cultures. His Native American friends gave him the name Ampa-O-Luta, meaning "the first tint of red in the east at dawn." In addition to his time spent on the Uintah reservation and at BYU, he was a piano soloist. He was also a member of the Church of Jesus Christ of Latter-day Saints and served a mission to the Northern States.

Hanson authored a book titled Sun Dance Land about the history of the Ute people. It also gives a detailed account of the history of The Sun Dance Opera. His master's thesis is called The Lure of Tam-Man Nacup Springtime Festival of the Utes. He authored another book called The Lure of the Wigwam.

== Works ==
All of Hanson's music was donated to the L. Tom Perry Special Collections at Brigham Young University.

=== Songs ===
Hanson wrote a number of songs about the 'Wild West' and the cowboy. He wrote several BYU songs, including "The College Song," "The Old Y Bell," "The Trail of the Y," and "Utah We Love Thee." He also wrote children's songs, including "I have two little hands" and "Wigwam moments."

=== Operas ===
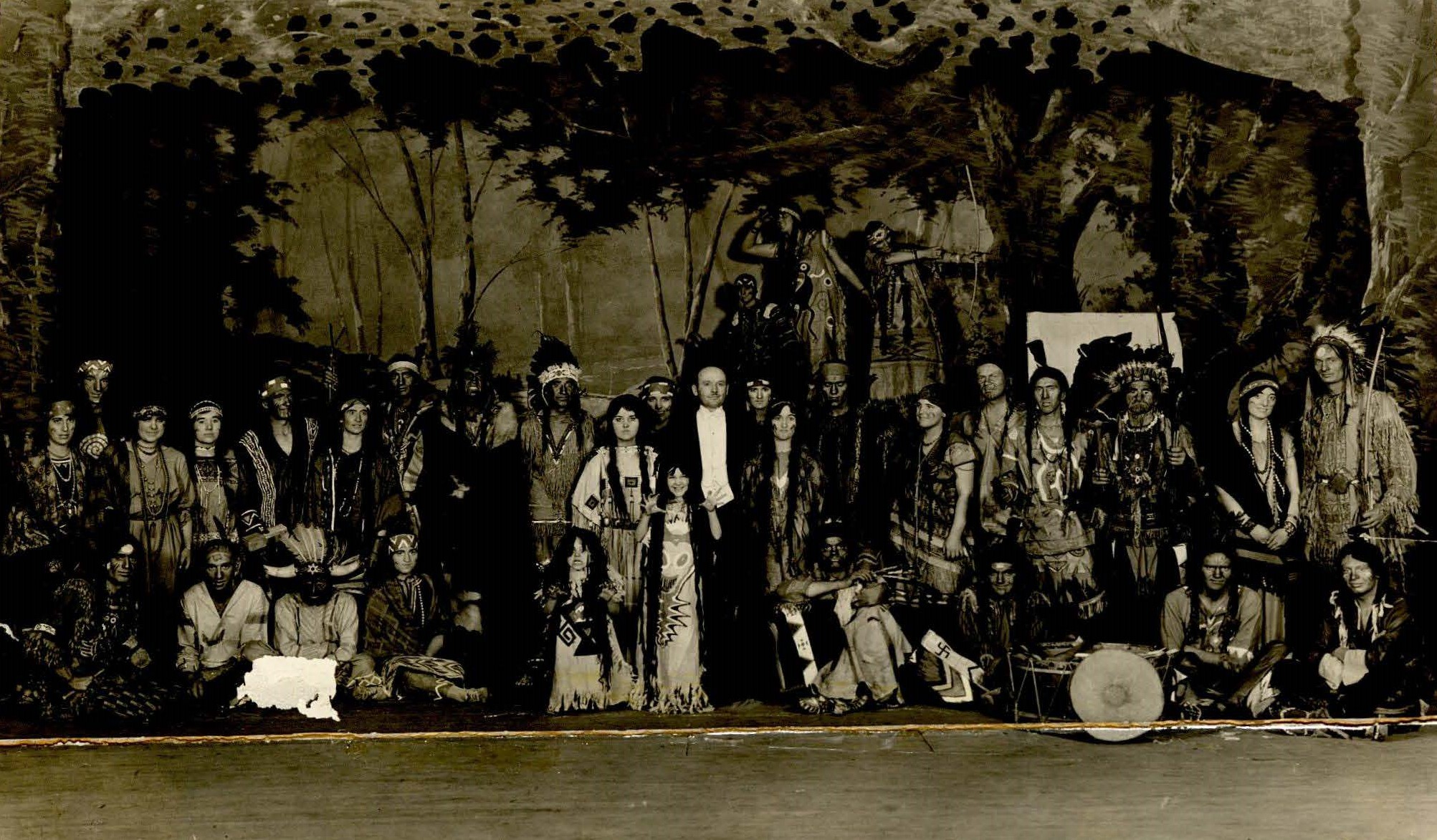
1928 Bear Dance Opera cast

Hanson wrote three operas: Sun Dance, Bear Dance, and Bleeding Heart, also known as The Heart of Timpanogos. Each of his operas featured ceremonial dances, chants, and costumes inspired by Hanson's experience among Native Americans in Utah. The music was inspired by melodies he had learned from the Utes. The Bear Dance Opera tells the story of "Tam-Man Nacup," a springtime festival of the Ute people. It was produced at BYU in 1927. Bleeding Heart was produced at BYU in 1938. The opera was based solely on Hanson's imagination; he called it an 'opera fantasia.'

==== Sun Dance Opera ====
When The Sun Dance first played in Utah in 1913, first in Vernal and then later in Provo, it played eleven consecutive times. It later played in Salt Lake City and then on Broadway in 1937. It was a collaborative work between Hanson and Gertrude Bonnin, also known as Zitkala-Sa. It consists of five acts depicting the "hopes, disappointments, and beliefs" of Native Americans. The characters in the opera are Sioux, the actual sun dance ritual was historically Lakota, Hanson's contributions were inspired by the Ute people, and Zitkala-Sa herself was Lakota, raised on a Sioux reservation. The opera features a love triangle between a Sioux warrior, a Sioux maiden, and a Shoshone.
