= List of religions and spiritual traditions =

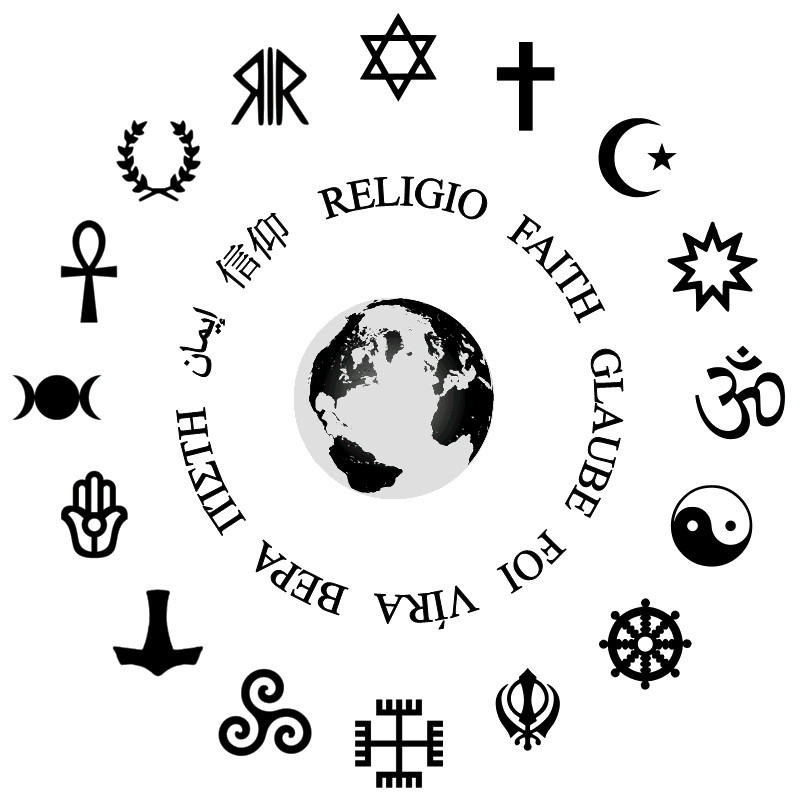
Religious symbols in clock-wise form from top: Judaism, Christianity, Islam, Baháʼí Faith, Hinduism, Taoism, Buddhism, Sikhism, Slavic neopaganism, Celtic polytheism, Heathenism (Germanic paganism), Semitic neopaganism, Wicca, Kemetism (Egyptian paganism), Hellenism (Greek paganism), Italo-Roman neopaganism.

Global percentage of adherents by religion

While the word religion is difficult to define and understand, one standard model of religion that is used in religious studies courses defines it as

[a] system of symbols which acts to establish powerful, pervasive, and long-lasting moods and motivations in men by formulating conceptions of a general order of existence and clothing these conceptions with such an aura of factuality that the moods and motivations seem uniquely realistic.

Many religions have their own narratives, symbols, traditions and sacred histories that are intended to give meaning to life or to explain the origin of life or the universe. They tend to derive morality, ethics, religious laws, or a preferred lifestyle from their ideas about the cosmos and human nature. According to some estimates, there are roughly 4,200 religions, churches, denominations, religious bodies, faith groups, tribes, cultures, movements, or ultimate concerns.

The word religion is sometimes used interchangeably with the words "faith" or "belief system", but religion differs from private belief in that it has a public aspect. Most religions have organized behaviours, including clerical hierarchies, a definition of what constitutes adherence or membership, congregations of laity, regular meetings or services for the purposes of worship of a deity or for prayer, holy places (either natural or architectural) or religious texts. Certain religions also have a sacred language often used in liturgical services. The practice of a religion may also include sacrifices, festivals, feasts, trance, rituals, ceremonies, initiations, funerals, marriages, meditation, invocation, mediumship, music, art, dance, public service, or other aspects of human culture. Religious beliefs have also been used to explain parapsychological phenomena such as out-of-body experiences, near-death experiences, and reincarnation, along with many other paranormal and supernatural experiences.

Some academics studying the subject have divided religions into three broad categories: world religions, a term which refers to transcultural, international faiths; Indigenous religions, which refers to smaller, culture-specific or nation-specific religious groups; and new religious movements, which refers to recently developed faiths. One modern academic theory of religion, social constructionism, says that religion is a modern concept that suggests all spiritual practice and worship follows a model similar to the Abrahamic religions as an orientation system that helps to interpret reality and define human beings, and thus believes that religion, as a concept, has been applied inappropriately to non-Western cultures that are not based upon such systems, or in which these systems are a substantially simpler construct.

== World religions ==
A world religion is a religion that has wide distribution and influence and goes beyond a singular ethnic group.

=== Eastern religions ===
Eastern religions are the religions which originated in East, South and Southeast Asia, encompassing a diverse range of eastern and spiritual traditions.

==== East Asian religions ====
World religions that originated in East Asia, also known as Taoic religions; namely Taoism and Confucianism and religions and traditions descended from them. They have their basis in East Asian folk religions and the Chinese religious philosophy schools called the Hundred Schools of Thought including:

- Taojia ("School of the Tao")
- Mojia ("School of Mo")
  - Mingjia ("School of Names")
- Rujia ("School of Scholars")
- Yangism
- Yinyangjia ("School of Yin Yang")
- Zajia ("School of Syncretism")

===== Confucianism =====
- Confucian ritual religion
- Current Texts Confucianism
- Donglin movement
- Han Learning
- Korean Confucianism
  - Tonghak
  - Silhak
- Lingnan Confucianism
- Neo-Confucianism
  - Cheng-Zhu school
  - Edo Neo-Confucianism
  - Tongcheng school
  - Yangmingism
    - Taizhou School
- New Confucianism
  - Confucian church
    - Indonesian Confucianism
    - Confucian Academy
  - Progressive Confucianism
- New Text
  - Changzhou school
  - Gongyang school
    - Holy Confucian Church
- Old Text
- Tianzuism
- Taigu school

===== Taoism =====
- New Taoism
- Qigong
  - Zhong Gong
- Quanzhen School
- Shangqing School
- Way of the Five Pecks of Rice
  - Way of the Celestial Masters
    - Northern Celestial Masters
    - Zhengyi Dao

Syncretic Taoism

- Dragon Gate Taoism
  - Wuliupai
- Huang–Lao
- Kōshin
- Xuanxue
- Yao Taoism

==== Indian religions ====
The four world religions that originated in the Indian subcontinent, also known as Dharmic and Indic religions; namely Hinduism, Jainism, Sikhism and Buddhism and religions and traditions descended from them. The Dharmic religions are derived from various schools of philosophy present in India which were largely part of either the Sramana movement or Brahmanism, including:

- Ajivika
- Ajñana
- Akiriya
- Buddhism
- Charvaka
- Jainism
- Nyaya
- Mimamsa
- Samkhya
- Sassatavada
- Vaisheshika
- Vedanta
- Yoga

===== Buddhism =====
Mahayana

- Tiantai
  - Tendai
  - Cheontae
- Huayan school
  - Baiyunzong (syncretic)
  - Daśabhūmikā
- Seon Buddhism
  - Jogye Order
    - Kwan Um School
  - Taego Order
- Thiền Buddhism
  - Tiep Hien Order
  - Trúc Lâm (syncretic)
- Zen Buddhism
  - Japanese Zen
  - Caodong school
    - Sōtō
      - Keizan
      - Jakuen
      - Giin
  - Linji school
    - Otokan
      - Rinzai
    - Ōbaku
    - Fuke-shū
  - Sanbo Kyodan
- Madhyamaka
  - Sanlun
  - Prasaṅgika
  - Svatantrika
- Nichiren Buddhism
  - Fuju-fuse
  - Honmon Butsuryū-shū
  - Kempon Hokke
  - Nichirenism
  - Nichiren Shōshū
  - Nichiren Shū
- Pure Land Buddhism
  - Jōdo Shinshū
    - Honganji-ha
    - Ōtani-ha
      - Ohigashi
  - Jōdo-shū
    - Chinzei
    - Seizan
  - Ji-shū
  - Yuzu Nembutsu
- Yogācāra
  - East Asian Yogācāra

Navayana

Theravada

- Sangharaj Nikaya
- Mahasthabir Nikaya
- Dwara Nikaya
- Shwegyin Nikaya
- Thudhamma Nikaya
- Amarapura–Rāmañña Nikāya
  - Galduwa Forest Tradition
- Siam Nikaya
- Sri Lankan Forest Tradition
- Dhammayuttika Nikaya
  - Thai Forest Tradition
- Maha Nikaya
  - Dhammakaya Movement
- Vipassana movement

Vajrayana

- Azhaliism
- Bongthingism
- Chinese Esoteric Buddhism
- Newar Buddhism
- Indonesian Esoteric Buddhism
- Shingon Buddhism
  - Tachikawa-ryū
- Southern Esoteric Buddhism
- Tibetan Buddhism
  - Bon (syncretic)
  - Gelug
    - Yellow Shamanism (syncretic)
  - Kagyu
    - Dagpo Kagyu
      - Karma Kagyu
      - Drukpa Kagyu
    - Shangpa Kagyu
  - Nyingma
  - Sakya
  - Jonang
  - Bodongpa

===== Hinduism =====
- Ganapatya
- Halumatha
- Sant Mat
  - Dadupanth
  - Kabir panth
  - Ravidassia religion
  - Sadh
- Satya Mahima Dharma
- Shaivism
  - Aghori
  - Kapalika
  - Kashmir Shaivism
  - Kaumaram
  - Nath
    - Adinath Sampradaya
    - Inchegeri Sampradaya
  - Pashupata Shaivism
  - Shaiva Siddhanta
  - Veerashaivism
    - Lingayatism
- Shaktism
  - Caribbean Shaktism
  - Srikula
- Smartism
- Śrauta
- Tantra
  - Kaula
    - Newar Hinduism
- Vaishnavism/Krishnaism
  - Balmikism
  - Bhagavata tradition
  - Brahma Sampradaya
    - Madhva tradition
    - Gaudiya Vaishnavism
      - Manipuri Vaishnavism
    - Haridasa
  - Ekasarana Dharma
  - Kapadi Sampradaya
  - Mahanubhava
  - Nimbarka Sampradaya
  - Pranami/Pranami Sampraday
  - Radha Vallabh Sampradaya
  - Ramsnehi Sampradaya
  - Rudra Sampradaya
    - Pushtimarg
  - Sri Vaishnavism
    - Ramanandi Sampradaya
    - Thenkalais
      - Manavala Mamunigal Sabha
  - Vaishnava-Sahajiya
  - Warkari

Vedanta

- Advaita Vedanta
- Akshar-Purushottam Darshan
- Bhedabheda
  - Achintya Bheda Abheda
  - Dvaitadvaita
- Dvaita Vedanta
- Pratyabhijna
- Shaiva Siddhanta
- Shiva Advaita
- Shuddhadvaita
- Vishishtadvaita

Syncretic Hinduism

- Banjara Hinduism
- Baarmati religion
- Bengali folk religion
  - Baul
  - Kartabhaja
  - Matuaism
- Bhil Hinduism
- Folk Hinduism
- Dyaoism
- Indonesian Hinduism
  - Balinese Hinduism
  - Javanese Hinduism
    - Tenggerese Hinduism
  - Kaharingan
  - Naurus
    - Nuaulu religion
- Lokhimon
- Zunism (disputedly Hindu)

===== Jainism =====
- Digambara
  - Kanji Panth
  - Taran Panth
- Śvētāmbara
  - Murtipujaka
  - Sthānakavāsī
- Yapaniya

===== Sikhism =====
Sects such as the Nirankari, Ramraiya and Namdhari are not accepted within the Sikh Rehat Maryada (Sikh Code of Conduct) as they believe in a current human guru.

- Tat Khalsa
- Udasi
- Nanakpanthi
- Nirankari
- Nirmala
- Sewapanthi
- Nihang
- Taksali
- Mina
- Ramraiya
- Namdhari
- Akhand Kirtani
- 3HO
- Sanatan Sikh

===== Yoga =====
- Ananda Yoga
- Bhakti yoga
- Hatha yoga
  - Bihar School of Yoga
- Integral Yoga
- Jivamukti Yoga
- Jnana yoga
- Karma yoga
- Kripalu Yoga
- Kriya Yoga
- Kundalini yoga
- Raja yoga
- Sahaja Yoga
- Siddha Yoga
- Sivananda yoga
- Surat Shabd Yoga
- Tantric Yoga

=== Middle Eastern religions ===
Middle Eastern religions are the world religions that have originated in or arisen to prominence within the geography of the Middle East. The term includes Abrahamic religions, which have been predominant in the region for the best part of a millennium, alongside the Iranian religions.

==== Abrahamic religions ====
The Abrahamic religions are a set of religions that respect or admire the religious figure Abraham as a patriarch and/or as a prophet. It most famously includes Judaism, Christianity and Islam but also includes various smaller religions such as the Druze faith and Samaritanism. Christianity and Islam are the largest Abrahamic religions, with them being adhered to by around half of the world's population.

===== Christianity =====
Early Christianity

- Arianism
- Jewish Christianity
  - Pauline Christianity
    - Proto-orthodox Christianity
      - Great Church
        - Nicene Christianity
          - Chalcedonian Christianity
            - Neo-Chalcedonism
- Johannine Community
- Proto-Gnosticism
  - Gnosticism
    - Bogomilism
    - Cainites
    - Catharism
    - Paulicianism
    - Sethianism
      - Valentinianism
    - Simonians
- Marcionism
Eastern Christianity

Church of the East

- Ancient Church of the East
- Assyrian Church of the East
  - Chaldean Syrian Church

Eastern Catholic Churches

- Albanian Greek Catholic Church
- Belarusian Greek Catholic Church
- Bulgarian Greek Catholic Church
- Byzantine Catholic Church of Croatia and Serbia
- Chaldean Catholic Church
- Greek Byzantine Catholic Church
- Hungarian Byzantine Catholic Church
- Italo-Albanian Catholic Church
- Macedonian Catholic Church
- Maronite Church
- Melkite Greek Catholic Church
- Romanian Greek Catholic Church
- Russian Greek Catholic Church
- Ruthenian Greek Catholic Church
- Slovak Greek Catholic Church
- Syriac Catholic Church
- Syro-Malankara Catholic Church
- Syro-Malabar Church
- Ukrainian Greek Catholic Church
- Ukrainian Orthodox Greek Catholic Church

Eastern Orthodox Church

- Albanian Orthodox Church
- Bulgarian Orthodox Church
- Georgian Orthodox Church
- Greek Orthodox Church
- Old Believers
- Romanian Orthodox Church
- Russian Orthodox Church
  - Belarusian Orthodox Church
- Serbian Orthodox Church
- Spiritual Christianity
- True Orthodox Church
  - Old Calendarists
- Ukrainian Orthodox Church

Oriental Orthodoxy

- Armenian Apostolic Church
- Coptic Orthodox Church
- Syriac Orthodox Church
  - Jacobite Syrian Christian Church
- Ethiopian Orthodox Church
- Eritrean Orthodox Church
- Malankara Orthodox Syrian Church
Western Christianity

Proto-Protestant

- Brethren of the Free Spirit
- Hussites
  - Czech Brethren
  - Moravians
- Lollardy
- Strigolniki
- Waldensians

Protestant

- Anabaptists (Radical Protestants)
  - Amish
  - Hutterites
  - Mennonites
  - River Brethren
  - Schwarzenau Brethren
- Anglicanism
  - Anglo-Catholicism
  - Continuing Anglican movement
  - Evangelical Anglicanism
- Baptists
- Black church
  - Black theology
- Charismatic Christianity
  - Pentecostalism
    - Oneness Pentecostalism
    - Word of Faith
  - Charismatic movement
    - Neo-charismatic movement
- Christian deism
- Confessing Movement
- Eastern Protestant Christianity
- Evangelicalism
  - Progressive Christianity
  - Protestant fundamentalism
- Lutheranism
  - Evangelical Catholic
  - Neo-Lutheranism
  - Pietism
- Methodism
  - Calvinistic Methodists
  - Holiness movement
  - Wesleyanism
- Puritans
- Quakers
- Swedenborgianism
- Unitarianism

Calvinism

- Amyraldism
- Arminianism
- Christian reconstructionism
- Congregational churches
- Continental Reformed churches
  - Swiss Reformed
  - Dutch Reformed
  - French Huguenot
- Hyper-Calvinism
- Neo-Calvinism
- New Calvinism
- Presbyterianism
- Zwinglianism

Restorationism

- Adventism
  - Seventh-day Adventist Church
- Churches of Christ
- Bible Student movement
  - Jehovah's Witnesses
- Latter Day Saint movement
  - The Church of Jesus Christ of Latter-day Saints
  - Mormon fundamentalism

Catholic

- Black Catholicism
- Charismatic Catholics
- Gallicanism
- Independent Catholic churches (a.k.a Independent Catholicism)
  - Old Catholic Church
- Liberal Catholicism
- Modernist Catholics
- Traditionalist Catholics
  - Sedevacantism
  - Sedeprivationism
- Ultramontanism

Syncretic

- Brauchau
- Christopaganism
  - Christian Wicca
- Cult of The Talking Cross
- Esoteric Christianity
  - Christian Theosophy
  - Christopaganism
  - Martinism
  - Universal White Brotherhood
- Folk Christianity
  - Folk Catholicism
  - Folk Orthodoxy
- God Worshipping Society
- Judaizers
  - Christian Kabbalah
  - Messianic Judaism
- Polish folk beliefs
- Pulahan
- Rizalista
- Samaritan Christians
- Seohak
- Spiritual Baptist

Other

- American Civil Religion
- Christian Universalism
- Nondenominational Christianity
- Nontrinitarianism

===== Islam =====
Khawarij

- Azraqi
- Haruriyyah
- Ibadi
- Najdat
- Sufri
Shia Islam
- Alawism
  - Murshidism
- Alevism
  - Alians
  - Bektashism
  - Kurdish Alevism
  - Kureyshan
- Allahiyah Movement
- Ghulat
  - Bazighiyya Shia
- Isma'ilism
  - Mustaali
    - Dawoodi Bohra
      - Alavi Bohra
      - Atba-i-Malak
        - Atba-i-Malak Badar
        - Atba-i-Malak Vakil
      - Hebtiahs Bohra
      - Progressive Dawoodi Bohra
    - Sulaymani
  - Nizari
- Twelver
  - Ja'fari jurisprudence
    - Akhbari
    - Shaykhism
    - Usuli
- Zaidiyyah
  - Jarudiyah
  - Batriyya
Sufism
- Bektashi Order
- Chishti Order
- Kubrawiya
  - Khufiyya
- Mevlevi Order
- Mouride
- Naqshbandi
  - Jahriyya
- Ni'matullāhī
- Qadiriyya
- Roshani
- Shadhili
- Suhrawardiyya
- Sufi Order International
- Tijaniyyah
- Universal Sufism
Sunni Islam
- Kalam
  - Ash'ari
    - Maliki
    - Shafi'i
  - Maturidi
    - Hanafi
      - Barelvi
      - Deobandi
      - Gedimu
- Athari
  - Hanbali
  - Zahiri
    - Almohadism
- Salafi
    - Madkhalism
    - Wahhabism
    - Ahle Hadith
  - Islamic Modernism

Syncretic

- Abangan
- Ali-Illahism
- Din-i Ilahi
- Kafirism
- Pagal Panthis
- Persian mysticism
- Satpanth
  - Barmati Panth
- Wetu Telu

Other

- Ahmadiyya
- Avicennism
- Chinese Islam
- European Islam
- Illuminationism
- Isawa
- Jadid
- Liberal movements within Islam
- Mahdavia
- Mahdist movement
- Muʿtazila
- Quranism
- Riaz Ahmed Gohar Shahi
  - Messiah Foundation International
- Transcendent Theosophy
- Zikrism

===== Judaism =====
Kabbalah
- Lurianic Kabbalah
- Merkabah mysticism
- Practical Kabbalah
- Prophetic Kabbalah
Rabbinic Judaism
- Conservative Judaism
- Humanistic Judaism
- Jewish Renewal
- Reconstructionist Judaism
- Reform Judaism

Orthodox Judaism

- Carlebach movement
- Haredi Judaism
  - Dor Daim
  - Hardal
  - Haredi burqa sect
  - Hasidic Judaism
  - Misnagdim
  - Sephardic Haredi
- Modern Orthodox Judaism
  - Open Orthodox Judaism
- Musar movement
  - Religious Zionism

Other

- Biblists
- Essenes
  - Bana'im
  - Hemerobaptists
  - Maghāriya
  - Nasoraeans
- Folk Judaism
- Haymanot
- Hellenistic Judaism
  - God fearers
- Houses of Hillel and Shammai
- Hypsistarianism
- Karaite Judaism
- Magarites
- Messianic sects
  - Ebionites
  - Elcesaites
- Nazirite
- Okbarites
- Pharisees
- Qemant Judaism
- Sabbateans
  - Frankism
- Sadducees
  - Boethusians
- Second Temple Judaism
- Synagogal Judaism
- Therapeutae
- Yudghanites
- Zealots
  - Sicarii

===== Other Abrahamic =====
- Bábism
  - Azalism
- Baháʼí Faith
  - Caravan of East and West
  - Free Baháʼís
  - Orthodox Baháʼí Faith
- Druze
- Mandaeism
- Samaritanism

==== Iranian religions ====
===== Manichaeism =====
- Athinganoi
- Chinese Manichaeism

===== Zoroastrianism =====
- Azarkeivanian
- Behafaridians
- Gayomarthians
- Ilm-e-Khshnoom
- Khurramites
- Mazdakism
  - Mazdaznan
- Sepasian
  - Azarkeivanian
- Ustadh Sis
- Zurvanism
  - Blagovery

===== Other =====
- Shabakism
- Yarsanism
  - Sarliyya
- Yazidism
- Yazdânism (proposed)

== Ethnoreligions ==
Religions that consist of the traditional customs, practices and beliefs of a particular ethnic group, refined and expanded upon based on that community's lived experience. Ethnoreligions generally aren't separable from the overall culture and society. Some adherents do not consider their ways "religion," preferring other terms. Many Indigenous religions incorporate forms of animism, totemism, and shamanism alongside nature, ancestor, star and animal worship.

=== African ===
Mainland African

- ǃKung religion
- Abwoi religion
- Acholi religion
- Afizere traditional religion
- Akom
  - Asante religion
- Azande traditional religion
  - Azande witchcraft
- Bafia religion
- Baka traditional religion
- Baoule traditional religion
- Bari traditional religion
- Bassa traditional religion
- Biri traditional religion
- Bobo religion
- Bori
- Bwa religion
- Chamba traditional religion
- Dahomean religion
- Damara religion
- Dan religion
- Dinka religion
- Dogon religion
- Ebira traditional religion
- Edo traditional religion
- Efik religion
- Ekoi religion
- Esan traditional religion
- Fali traditional religion
- Frafra beliefs
- Gbagyi traditional religion
- Ghanaian witchcraft
- Hadza religion
- Hyel
- Idoma traditional religion
- Ijaw traditional religion
- Inam
- Jola traditional religion
- Khoekhoen religion
- Kissi traditional religion
- Kono traditional religion
- Koore religion
- Krahn religion
- Kuku traditional beliefs
- Libyco-Berber religion
- Lobi animism
- Maasai religion
- Madi traditional religion
- Manjak religion
- Moba ethnic religion
- Mursi animism
- Nso religion
- Nuer religion
- Nyongo Society
  - Bakossi beliefs
- Odinala / Odinani
- Oropom religion
- Otuho religion
- Safwa religion
- Samburu religion
- San religion
  - N'um
- Serer religion
- Sidama religion
- Surma religion
- Tammari traditional religion
- Temne traditional religion
- Turkana traditional religion
- Urhobo traditional religion
- Vodun
- Waaqeffanna
- Yoruba religion
  - Ifá
- Indigenous religion in Zimbabwe
  - Shona traditional religion
- Yakan

Bantu religion

- Abagusii religion
- Akamba traditional religion
- AmaMpondomise traditional religion
- Badimo
- Balondo religion
- Baluba religion
- Bamileke religion
- Bamum traditional religion
- Banyole traditional beliefs
- Bubi spirituality
- Bushongo religion
- Bwiti
- Chokwe spiritual beliefs
- Duala traditional religion
- Embu beliefs
- Fipa religion
- Furiiru traditional religion
- Giriama traditional religion
- Herero traditional faith
- Himba religion
- Kikuyu traditional religion
- Kongo religion
- Kwe faith
- Luhya religion
- Luvale religion
- Makonde witchcraft
- Makua religion
- Mbole religion
- Ndau witchcraft
- Nyakyusa religion
- Nyau
- Oro Religion
- Ovambo traditional religion
- Pedi traditional religion
- Songye religion
- Suku religion
- Swazi traditional religion
- Tonga religion
- Tsonga traditional religion
- Xhosa traditional religion
- Zulu traditional religion

Diasporic African

- Abakuá
- Arará
- Batuque
- Birongo
- Candomblé
  - Candomblé Bantu
  - Candomblé Jejé
  - Candomblé Ketu
- Comfa
- Convince
- Cuban Vodú
- Dominican Vudú
- Encantaria
- Espiritismo
- Haitian Vodou
  - Bizango
- Hoodoo
- Jamaican Maroon religion
- Jarê
- Kélé
- Kumina
- Louisiana Voodoo
  - New Orleans Voodoo
- Montamentu
- Myal
- Obeah
- Palo
- Quimbanda
- Rada
- Sanctity of Jaguaripe
- Santería
  - Afro-Chinese Santeria
- Tambor de Mina
- Trinidad Orisha
- Umbanda
- Winti
  - Saramaka religion

=== Afroasiatic ===
- Aksumite religion
- Amorite religion
- Arabian paganism
- Assyrian religion
- Babylonian religion
- Beduin shamanism
- Canaanite religion
- Eblaite religion
- Egyptian religion
  - Atenism
  - Mysteries of Osiris
  - New Solar Theology
- Guanche religion
- Harranian religion
- Midianite religion
- Nabataean religion
- Punic religion
- Sabian religion
- Shamsiyah
- South Arabian paganism
- Yahwism

=== Altaic ===
- Altaian shamanism
- Dukha shamanism
- Evenki shamanism
- Hunnic religion
- Khitan religion
- Nanai shamanism
- Manchu shamanism
- Böö Mörgöl
  - Black shamanism
  - Tengrism
- Oroqen shamanism
- Shor shamanism
- Soyot shamanism
- Ulch shamanism
- Vattisen Yaly
- Yakut shamanism

=== American ===
- Ache religion
- Achomawi religion
- Acjachemen religion
- Akawaio religion
- Alaska Native religions
  - Alaskan shamanism
  - Inuit religion
  - Tanana shamanism
  - Yupik shamanism
    - Yuit shamanism
    - Sirenik shamanism
- Andean religions
  - Aymara religion
  - Chauvin religion
  - Chimor religion
  - Lima religion
  - Moche religion
  - Nazca religion
  - Taki Unquy
  - Tiwanaku religion
  - Wari religion
- Andoque religion
- Anishinaabe religions
  - Odawa religion
  - Ojibwe religion
  - Midewiwin
  - Potawatomi religion
  - Wabunowin
- Apache religion
- Arhuaco spirituality
- Atacama religion
- Blackfoot religion
- Bororo totemism
- Caddo religion
- Calusa religion
- Cree religion
- Croatan beliefs
- Crow religion
- Garifuna spirituality
- Guarayos beliefs
- Guayupe religion
- Gwich'in beliefs
- Huaorani religion
- Hupda cosmgony
- Illinois religion
- Iroquoian religions
  - Cherokee religion
  - Four Mothers Society
  - Keetoowah Society
  - Mohawk religion
  - Onondaga religion
  - Wendat religion
  - Wyandot religion
- Jivaroan religion
  - Achuar religion
  - Aguaruna religion
  - Shuar shamanism
- Karankawa religion
- Kayabi religion
- Kalapalo beliefs
- Kalinago religion
- Kichwa religion
- Kogi religion
- Kuikoro religion
- Kuksu
  - Cahto religion
  - Esselen beliefs
  - Pomo religion
- Lokono religion
- Maleku beliefs
- Mandan religion
- Mapuche religion
- Marajoara religion
- Matses beliefs
- Mi'kmaq religion
- Mohave religion
- Muisca religion
- Muzo religion
- Navajo beliefs
- Omaha religion
- Osage spirituality
- Parakanã shamanism
- Pech religion
- Pemon religion
- Penobscot spirituality
- Pericues religion
- Piaroa religion
- Pueblo religion
  - Acoma Pueblo religion
  - Ancestral Pueblo religion (Basketmaker III) (Pueblo II) (Pueblo III) (Pueblo IV)
- Puruhá religion
- Q'ero beliefs
- Rikbaktsa beliefs
- Seminole religion
- Seri religion
- Sioux religion
  - Dakota Spirituality
  - Lakota religion
    - Wocekiye
- Southeastern Ceremonial Complex (woodland religions during the Mississippian period)
  - Earth Cult
- Taensa religion
- Taino religion
- Tairona religion
- Tapirape shamanism
- Tehuelche religion
- Ticuna shamanism
- Toba religion
- Tlingit religion
- Wai-Wai religion
- Wapishana religion
- Warao religion
- Washat Dreamers Religion
- Wayuu religion
- Wiyot religion
- Yaqui religion
- Yaruro religion

Mesoamerican

- Aztec religion
- Classical Veracruz religion
- Cora religion
- Huichol religion
- Mixe religion
- Nagualism
- Olmec religion
- Purépecha religion
- Teotihuacan religion
- Tepehuan beliefs
- Tlapanec religion
- Totonac religion
- Mazatec religion
  - Mazatec shamanism
- Zapotec religion

Maya

- Chuj religion
- Huastec religion
- Lacandon religion
- Maximon
- Mopan religion
- Pech religion
- Q'eqchi' religion
- Tzeltal religion
- Tzotzil religion
- Tzʼutujil religion

=== Austroasiatic ===
- Asur religion
- Birhor traditional religion
- Bru religion
- Vietnamese folk religion
  - Cá Ông worship
  - Đạo Mẫu
    - Four Palaces
  - Thánh Trần worship
- Ka Niam Khasi
- Mon religion
- Muong ethnic religion
- Nicobarese traditional religion
- Nocte religion
- Niamtre
- Pacoh animism
- Sari Dharam
- Sarnaism
- Senoi ethnic religion
- Sora traditional beliefs
- Tampuan animism
- Ta Oi animism
- Wancho religion

=== Austronesian ===
- Adat Pu'un
- Aluk
- Arioi
- Amis religion
- Batak religion (Palawan)
- Batak religion (Sumatra)
  - Parmalim
- Bicolano religion
- Blaan religion
- Capiznon religion
- Carolinian religion
- Chamorro religion
- Chuukese religion
- Cuyunon religion
- Datuk Keramat
- Dayak religion
  - Kaharingan
- Gaddang religion
- Hawaiian religion
- Ifugao religion
- Ilocano religion
- Itneg religion
- Jakun religion
- Jarai religion
- Jingi Tiu
- Kalinga religion
- Kanakanavu religion
- Kankanaey religion
- Kapitayan
  - Kangeanese religion
- Karay-a religion
- Karo Pemena
- Kejawèn
- Kendayan religion
- Mangyan religion
- Maori religion
- Marapu
- Melanau religion
- Momolianism
- Murut religion
  - Malingkote
- Nauruan indigenous religion
- Orang Kanaq religion
- Orang Seletar religion
- Paiwan shamanism
- Palawan religion
- Pangasinan religion
- Pengarap Iban
- Rejang religion
- Rotenese religion
- Sakizaya native religion
- Sama Bajau religion
- Sambal religion
- Saminism Movement
- Sangirese religion
- Semai religion
- Semaq Beri religion
- Subanon religion
- Sumbawa religion
- Sunda Wiwitan
- Tagalog religion
- Tagbanwa religion
- Taivoan animism
- Tala-ē-fonua
- Tao native religion
- Tboli religion
- Teduray religion
- Temuan religion
- Visayan religion
- Wai Apu religion

=== Caucasian ===
- Caucasian Albanian paganism
- Khabzeism
- Vainakh religion

=== Dravidian ===
- Khond traditional religion
- Kota religion
- Koyapunem
- Sauria Paharia religion
- Toda religion

=== Indo-European ===
- Albanian paganism
- Ancient Greek religion
  - Aristotelianism
  - Epicureanism
  - Greco-Buddhism
  - Hellenistic religion
  - Hermeticism
  - Platonism
    - Middle Platonism
    - Neoplatonism
  - Orphism
  - Pythagoreanism
    - Neopythagoreanism
  - School of the Sextii
  - Stoicism
- Ancient Iranian religion
- Anglo-Saxon paganism
- Benandanti
- Celtic religion
  - Celtic Animism
- Cimbri religion
- Dacian religion
- Frankish paganism
- Gallaecian religion
- Germanic paganism
- Gothic paganism
- Hattian religion
- Hittite religion
- Illyrian religion
  - Iapydes religion
- Kalash religion
- Luwian religion
- Lydian religion
- Marsi religion
- Mazdaism
- Mycenaean religion
- Nagpuria religion
- Nordic Bronze Age religion
- Norse religion
- Paeonian religion
- Palà religion
- Phrygian religion
- Proto-Celtic paganism (proposed)
- Proto-Germanic paganism (proposed)
- Proto-Indo-Iranian religion (proposed)
- Punjabi folk religion
- Roman religion
  - Gallo-Roman religion
  - Mithraism
- Sabine religion
- Samnite religion
- Saxon paganism
- Scythian religion
- Slavic paganism
- Tharu religion
- Thracian religion
- Tocharian religion
- Umbrian religion

=== Koreanic and Japonic ===
- Musok
  - Gasin faith
- Ryukyuan religion

Shinto

- Matagi spirituality
- Fujiko
- Rokugō Manzan

Sect Shinto

- Fukko
  - Taikyō
  - Izumo-taishakyo
- Jingukyo
- Juka
- Suika
  - Taiseikyō
- Konkōkyō
- Ontake-kyō
- Oomoto
- Kurozumikyō
- Shugendō

Shrine Shinto

- Association of Shinto Shrines
- Kokugaku
  - State Shinto

=== Melanesian and Aboriginal ===
- Dumo spirituality
- Fijian ancient religion
- Fore traditional beliefs
- Gamilaraay dreaming
- Kaluli religion
- Kanak traditional beliefs
- Korowai religion
- Tasmanian Aboriginal spirituality
- Trobriand traditional beliefs
- Urapmin traditional beliefs

=== Negrito ===
- Aeta religion
- Ati animism
- Onge native religion
- Semang animism
- Vedda original religion

=== Paleosiberian ===
- Ainu religion
- Koryak religion
- Itelmen religion
- Nivkh traditional religion
- Yukaghir shamanism

=== Sino-Tibetan ===
- Banrawat religion
- Bathouism
- Benzhuism
- Biate religion
- Bimoism
- Bon
  - Hangui
- Burmese folk religion
  - Lisu religion
- Chang religion
  - Xínghaode
- Chutia religion
- Daba
- Dingba
- Dongba
- Gurung shamanism
- Hani religion
- Honghari
- Jingpo religion
- Kan Khwan
- Karen animism
- Kiratism
  - Yumaism
- Krama
- Maring beliefs
- Miji religion
- Mizo religion
- Mro religion
- Nuo folk religion
- Nyezi-No
- Pfutsana
- Qiang folk religion
- Reang religion
- Sakhua
- Sanamahism
- Songsarek
- Tangsa religion
  - Rangfrah
- Root West
- Tingkao Ragwang Chapriak
- Toto religion
- Zahv

Chinese folk religion

- Ancestor Worship
- Chinese folk religion in Southeast Asia
- Faism
- Mazu worship
- Northeast China folk religion
- Queen Mother worship
- Shangdiism
- Shang religion
  - Shang ancestor worship
- Shendao
- Taiwanese folk beliefs
- Wang Ye worship
- Wuism
  - Jurchen/Qing shamanism
  - Ming shamanism
- Zhou religion

=== Tai and Miao ===
- Ahom religion
- Giay animism
- Hlai animism
- Kev Dab Kev Qhuas
- Kam religion
- Lamet religion
- Maonan traditional religion
- Mo
- Nung religion
- Pa Then religion
- Qabiao religion
- Saek religion
- Satsana Phi
- Sui religion
- Then

=== Uralic ===
- Baltic Finnic paganism
- Finnish paganism
- Mari Native Religion
- Proto-Uralic religion (proposed)
- Hungarian shamanism
- Sámi shamanism

=== Other ===
- Burusho shamanism
- Cucuteni–Trypillia religion
- Elamite religion
- Etruscan religion
- Harappan religion
- Hurrian religion
- Kushite religion
- Minoan religion
- Nuragic religion
- Sumerian religion
- Urartian religion
- Urreligion (proposed)
  - Urmonotheismus (proposed)

== New religious movements ==
Religions that cannot be classed as either world religions or traditional folk religions, and are usually recent in their inception. Non-cargo cults are generally excluded from this list, see list of cults for groups considered cults.

=== Cargo cults ===
- John Frum
- Johnson cult
- Pomio Kivung
- Prince Philip Movement
- Vailala Madness

=== Cheondoism ===
- Baekbaekgyo
- Jeungsanism
  - Bocheonism
  - Daesun Jinrihoe
  - Jeung San Do
  - Seondogyo
- Suunism
- Suwunism

=== Chinese salvationist religions ===
- Baguadao
- Dejiao
- Huangjidao
- Huangtiandao
- Huazhaidao
- Jiugongdao
- Luandao
- Luoism
  - Chinese religions of fasting
    - Xiantiandao
      - Guiyidao
      - Shengdao
      - Yaochidao
      - Yiguandao
        - Haizidao
      - Yixin Tiandao
  - Dacheng
  - Hongyangism
- Maitreyanism
- Sanban Puren Pai
- Sanyiism
- Shanrendao
- Taigu school
- Tiandihui
- Tiandiism
- Tianguangdao
- Tianxian Miaodao
- Weixinism
- White Lotus
- Xuanyuandao
- Yellow Sand Society
- Zailiism
- Zhongyongdao

=== Entheogenic religions ===
- Church of the Universe
- Healing Church in Rhode Island
- Neo-American Church
- Santo Daime
- Temple of the True Inner Light
- THC Ministry
- União do Vegetal

=== Neopaganism ===
==== Ethnic neopaganism ====
- Abkhaz neopaganism
- Assianism
- Baltic neopaganism
  - Dievturība
  - Romuva
- Celtic neopaganism
  - Celtic reconstructionist paganism
- Church of the Guanche People
- Heathenry
  - Scandinavian heathenry
- Hellenism
- Hetanism
- Italo-Roman neopaganism
- Kemetism
- Semitic neopaganism
- Rodnovery
- Uralic neopaganism
  - Estonian neopaganism
  - Suomenusko
  - Hungarian neopaganism
  - Mastorava
  - Udmurt Vos
- Zalmoxianism
- Zuism

Neo-Tengrism

- Burkhanism
- Neo-Tengrism
  - Aiyy
  - Tengir Ordo
  - Vattisen Yaly

==== Syncretic neopaganism ====
- Adonism
- Bazhovism
- Church of All Worlds
- Cochrane's Craft
- Druidry
  - Ár nDraíocht Féin
  - Order of Bards, Ovates, and Druids
  - Reformed Druids of North America
- Huna
- Gaianism
- Ivanovism
- Nature religion
- Neoshamanism
  - Tensegrity
  - Urban shamanism
- Radical Faeries
- Ringing Cedars' Anastasianism
- Russian Authentism
- Russian vedism
- Stregheria
- Summum
- Technopaganism
- Temple of Priapus
- Vseyasvetnaya Gramota
- Wicca
  - British Traditional Wicca
    - Alexandrian Wicca
    - Blue Star Wicca
    - Central Valley Wicca
    - Chthonioi Alexandrian Wicca
    - Gardnerian Wicca
  - Celtic Wicca
  - Faery Wicca
  - Feri Tradition
  - Georgian Wicca
  - Odyssean Wicca
  - Seax-Wica
  - Universal Eclectic Wicca
  - Wiccan Churches

Dangunism

- Daejongism

Goddess religions

- Church of Aphrodite
- Discordianism
- Feraferia
- Goddess Wicca
  - Covenant of the Goddess
  - Dianic Wicca
    - Faerie faith
- Reclaiming

=== Neo-Sant Mat ===
- Advait Mat
- Ancient Teachings of the Masters
- Dera Sacha Sauda
- Eckankar
- Elan Vital (formerly Divine Light Mission)
- Manavta Mandir
- Movement of Spiritual Inner Awareness
- Radha Soami
- Radha Soami Satsang Beas
- Radha Soami Satsang Dayagbal
- Radha Swami Satsang, Dinod
- Ruhani Satsang
- Ravidassia
- Science of Spirituality (a.k.a. Sawan Kirpal Ruhani Mission)

=== New Age Movement ===
- Association for Research and Enlightenment
- Church Universal and Triumphant
- Mayanism
- Michael Teachings
- Rainbow Family
- The Infinite Way

=== New Thought ===
- Church of Divine Science
- Church of the Truth
- Home of Truth
- Jewish Science
- Psychiana
- Religious Science
- Scientology
  - Independent Scientology
- Seicho-no-Ie
- Unity Church
- Universal Foundation for Better Living

=== Nonsectarian Theism ===
- Deism
  - Cult of the Supreme Being
  - Decadary Cult
  - Enlightenment Deism
  - Gottgläubig
  - Moralistic therapeutic deism
  - Spinozism
  - Theophilanthropy
- Egotheism
- Henotheism
- Kathenotheism
- Liberal theism
- Neo-revelationism
- Philosophical theism
- Theistic naturalism

=== Nontheism and Atheism ===
- Adevism
- Agnosticism
  - Agnostic atheism
  - Agnostic theism
  - Christian agnosticism
  - God-Building
- Apatheism
  - Practical atheism
- Atheopaganism
- Christian atheism
  - Nontheist Quakers
- Cosmicism
- Cult of Reason
- Cultural Christians
- Cultural Hindus
- Cultural Muslims
- Ecospirituality
  - Biosophy
  - Religious naturalism
  - Spiritual ecology
  - Spiritual naturalism
- Freethought
  - North Texas Church of Freethought
- Humanism
  - Christian humanism
  - Ethical movement
  - Humanistic Judaism
  - Religious humanism
  - Renaissance Humanism
  - Secular humanism
  - Theistic humanism
- Hylotheism
- Ietsism
- Ignosticism
- Implicit and explicit atheism
- Irreligion
- Jewish atheism
- Negative and positive atheism
- Nirīśvaravāda
- Non-theistic Satanism
  - Our Lady of Endor Coven
  - LaVeyan Satanism
    - Church of Satan
    - First Satanic Church
  - The Satanic Temple
- Monism
  - Dialectical monism
  - Indefinite monism
- Moral Re-Armament
- Pandeism
  - Christian pandeism
- Panendeism
- Panentheism
  - Process theology
- Pantheism
  - Classical pantheism
  - Cosmotheism
  - Naturalistic pantheism
  - Natural religion
- Post-theism
- Rational mysticism
- Religion of Humanity
  - Church of Humanity
- Secularism
  - Jewish secularism
  - Secular Buddhism
  - Secular paganism
  - Secular religion
  - Secular spirituality
  - Secular theology
- Statolatry
- Syntheism
- Theopanism
- Theothanatology
- Transhumanism
  - Cosmism
  - Terasem
  - Theta Noir
- Transtheism

=== Pan-racial religions ===
==== Black ====
- African Zionism
- Ausar Auset Society
- Black Muslims
  - American Society of Muslims
- Dini Ya Msambwa
- Five-Percent Nation
- Godianism
- Hauka
- Igbe religion
- Moorish Science Temple of America
  - Moorish Orthodox Church of America
- Movement for the Restoration of the Ten Commandments of God
- Mumboism
- Mungiki
- Nation of Islam
  - United Nation of Islam
- Nuwaubian Nation
Black Hebrew Israelites
- African Hebrew Israelites of Jerusalem
- Church of God and Saints of Christ
- Commandment Keepersent
- Israelite Church of God in Jesus Christ
- Israelite School of Universal Practical Knowledge
- Nation of Yahweh
- One West Camp
- Yakan
Rastafari
- Bobo Ashanti
- Nyabinghi
- Twelve Tribes of Israel

==== Native American ====
- Bekeranta
- Dream Dance
- Ghost Dance
- Indian Shaker Church
- Longhouse Religion
- Mexicayotl
- Native American Church
  - Big Moon Peyotism
- Wasshat religion

==== White ====
- Creativity
- Fascist Occultism
  - Ariosophy
  - Esoteric Nazism
  - Evolaism
  - Fascist mysticism
  - Nazi Occultism
  - Statolatry
- Israelism
  - British Israelism
  - Christian Identity
  - French Israelism
  - Nordic Israelism
- Order of Nine Angles
- Peterburgian Vedism
- Sylenkoism
- Völkisch movement
  - German Faith Movement
  - Wotansvolk
- Ynglism
  - Levashovism

=== Parody religions and fiction-based religions ===
- The All-Joking, All-Drunken Synod of Fools and Jesters
- Bokononism
- The Cause
- Church of Euthanasia
- Church of the Flying Spaghetti Monster (a.k.a. "Pastafarianism")
- Church of the SubGenius
- The Cult of Kek
- Dinkoism
- Dudeism
- Earthseed
- Eventualism
- First Church of the Last Laugh
- Iglesia Maradoniana
- Intelligent falling
- Invisible Pink Unicorn
- Jediism
- Kibology
- Kopimism
- Landover Baptist Church
- Last Thursdayism
- Matrixism
- The Nine Divines
- 'Pataphysics
- Russell's teapot
- Silinism
- Shrekism
- Sisters of Perpetual Indulgence
- Tarvuism
- Trekism
- United Church of Bacon

=== Shinshukyo ===
- Aum Shinrikyo
  - Aleph
  - Hikari no Wa
- Church of World Messianity
- Dōkai
- Gedatsukai
- Happy Science
- Higashikuni-kyo
- Ijun
- Kenshōkai
- Kokuchukai
- Mahikari
  - Sukyo Mahikari
  - World Divine Light
- Myōdōkai Kyōdan
- Nipponzan-Myōhōji-Daisanga
- Shinreikyo
  - Shōroku Shintō Yamatoyama
  - Shumei
- Shingaku
- Shinmeiaishinkai
- Shōshinkai
- Tenrikyo
  - Tenrin-Ō Meisei Kyōdan
  - Honmichi
    - Honbushin
    - Sekai Shindokyo
  - Daehan Cheolligyo
- Tenshō Kōtai Jingūkyō
- Zenrinkyo

=== UFO religions ===
- Aetherius Society
- Ashtar Galactic Command
- Chen Tao (UFO religion)
- Fiat Lux
- Ground Crew Project
- Heaven's Gate
- Industrial Church of the New World Comforter
- Mark-Age
- Nuwaubian Nation
- Raëlism
- Rational Culture
- The Seekers
- Unarius Academy of Science
- Universe people
- Urantia movement
- Vale do Amanhecer

=== Western esotericism ===
- Anthroposophy
- Biotronics
- Builders of the Adytum
- Chaos magic
  - Illuminates of Thanateros
  - Thee Temple ov Psychick Youth
- Cthulhu Mythos cults
- Emin
- Enochian magic
- Eubiose
- Goetia
- Fourth Way
- Fraternity of the Inner Light
- Hermeticism
  - Hermetic Order of the Golden Dawn
    - The Hermetic Order of the Golden Dawn, Inc.
  - Hermetic Qabalah
- Illuminism
- Luciferianism
  - Fraternitas Saturni
  - Neo-Luciferian Church
- Occultism
- Postmodern religion
- Renaissance magic
- Rose of the World
- Rosicrucian
  - Ancient Mystical Order Rosae Crucis
  - Lectorium Rosicrucianum
  - Rosicrucian Fellowship
- Satanism
  - Theistic Satanism
    - Joy of Satan
    - Temple of the Black Light
    - Temple of Set
- Spiritualism
  - Agasha Temple of Wisdom
  - Faithism
- Temple of the Vampire
- Thelema
  - A∴A∴
  - Ordo Templi Orientis
  - Typhonian Order
- Theosophy
  - Muckers
  - Neo-Theosophy
    - Agni Yoga
      - Roerichism
    - New Acropolis

=== World religion-derived new religions ===
==== Abrahamic-derived ====
- Ahmadi Religion of Peace and Light
- Antoinism
- Archeosophical Society
- Beili Wang
- Branch Davidians
- Chapel of Russia's Resurrection
- Chrislam
- Christian Science
- Creation Spirituality
- Daheshism
- Donyipoloism
- Eastern Lightning
- Faizrakhmanist
- The Family International
- Gafatar
- Grail Movement
- Heraka
- Holy Spirit of Blood and Water Church
- Ishikism
- Kan Imam San
- Koreshanity
- Krama
- Lalpa Kohhran Thar
- Last Testamentism
- Mama Tata
- Mentuhui
- Modekngei
- Neo-Templarism
- Noahidism
- Pai Marire
- Pilgrims of Ares
- Rātana
- Ringatu
- Soldiers of Heaven
- Spiritism
- Unification Church
  - P'ikareum
- Universal White Brotherhood
- Victory Altar
- World Elijah Evangelical Mission
- World Mission Society Church of God
- Zhushenjiao

==== Hindu reform movements ====
- Adidam
- Adi Dharm
  - Brahmoism
    - Brahmo Samaj
      - Sadharan Brahmo Samaj
- Ananda
- Ananda Ashrama
- Ananda Marga
- Arya Samaj
- Chinmaya Mission
- Hare Krishna
- Mahanam Sampraday
- Mahima Dharma
- Oneness Movement
- Rajneesh movement
- Satsang
- Shirdi Sai Baba movement
- Sivananda Yoga Vedanta Centres
- Sri Aurobindo Ashram
- Sri Ramana Ashram
  - Neo-Advaita
- Swaminarayan Sampradaya
  - Bochasanwasi Akshar Purushottam Swaminarayan Sanstha
  - Laxmi Narayan Dev Gadi
    - International Swaminarayan Satsang Mandal
    - Swaminarayan Gurukul
  - Nar Narayan Dev Gadi
    - International Swaminarayan Satsang Organisation
    - Narnarayan Dev Yuvak Mandal
  - Swaminarayan Gadi (Maninagar)
  - Swaminarayan Mandir Vasna Sanstha
- Transcendental Meditation

==== Neo-Buddhism ====
- Beophwagye
- Đạo Bửu Sơn Kỳ Hương
  - Hòa Hảo
  - Tứ Ân Hiếu Nghĩa
- Diamond Way Buddhism
- Falun Gong
- Guanyin Famen
- Humanistic Buddhism
- Navayana
- New Kadampa Tradition
- Nipponzan-Myōhōji-Daisanga
- PL Kyodan
- Reiyūkai
  - Risshō Kōsei Kai
- Rimé movement
- Shambhala Buddhism
- Shinnyo-en
- Soka Gakkai
- Triratna Buddhist Community
- True Buddha School
- Won Buddhism

==== Perennial and interfaith ====
- Anandamayee Sangha
- Bell religion
- Brahma Kumaris
- Caodaism
- Coconut religion
- Đạo Dừa
- Hanol-gyo
- Living Interfaith
- Meivazhi
- Moorish Orthodox Church of America
- Omnism
- Open-source religion
- Satya Dharma
- Sathya Sai Baba movement
- Share International
- Subud

== Other categorisations ==
=== By area ===
- Religion in Africa
- Religion in Asia
- Religion in Oceania
- Religion in Europe
- Religion in North America
- Religion in South America
- Religions by country
  - List of state-established religions
  - Buddhism by country
    - Buddhism in the United States
  - Christianity by country
    - Roman Catholicism by country
    - Eastern Orthodoxy by country
    - Oriental Orthodoxy by country
    - Protestantism by country
  - Hinduism by country
  - Islam by country
    - Ahmadiyya by country
  - Judaism by country, Jewish population by country
  - Sikhism by country

== See also ==
- Animal faith
- Civil religion
- Cult of personality
- Elite religion
- History of religion
- List of messiah claimants
- List of mythologies
- List of pantheons
- List of philosophies
- List of religious organizations
- List of religious populations
- Lists of deities
- Lists of people by belief
- Magic
- Material religion
- Mythology
- Pseudoreligion
- Religious fundamentalism
- Religious philosophy
- State religion
- Witchcraft

== Bibliography ==
- Clarke, Peter B., ed. (2006). Encyclopedia of New Religious Movements. London; New York: Routledge. ISBN 9-78-0-415-26707-6.
- Doniger, Wendy, ed. (2006). Britannica Encyclopedia of World Religions. Encyclopaedia Britannica. ISBN 978-1593392666.
- Jones, Lindsay, ed. (2004). Encyclopedia of Religion. Vol. 1–15 (2 ed.). New York: MacMillan Reference. ISBN 0029094801.
- Juergensmeyer, Mark; Roof, Wade Clark, eds. (2012). Encyclopedia of Global Religion. Vol. 1. Los Angeles, Ca: SAGE Publ. ISBN 978-0-7619-2729-7.
- Kitagawa, Joseph M., ed. (2002) [1987]. The Religious Traditions of Asia: Religion, History, and Culture. London: RoutledgeCurzon. ISBN 0-7007-1762-5.
- Lewis, James R., ed. (2004). The Oxford Handbook of New Religious Movements. New York: Oxford University Press. ISBN 0-19-514986-6.
- Lewis, James R.; Tøllefsen, Inga Bårdsen, eds. (2016) [2008]. The Oxford Handbook of New Religious Movements. Oxford Handbooks. Vol. 2 (2nd ed.). New York: Oxford University Press. ISBN 978-0-19-046617-6. Archived from the original on 2023-03-31.
- Melton, J. Gordon (2003) [1978]. Encyclopedia of American Religions (7th ed.). Farmington Hills, Mi: Gale Group. ISBN 978-0-7876-6384-1.
- Melton, J. Gordon; Baumann, Martin, eds. (2010). Religions of the world: a comprehensive encyclopedia of beliefs and practices (PDF). Vol. 1–6 (2nd ed.). Santa Barbara, Ca; Denver, Co; Oxford: ABC-Clio. ISBN 978-1-59884-203-6.
- Merriam-Webster's Encyclopedia of World Religions. Springfield, Ma: Merriam-Webster. 1999. ISBN 0-87779-044-2.
