= Shamanism in China =

Shamanism in China (Chinese: 中国萨满教; pinyin: Zhōngguó sàmǎnjiào) may refer to all the forms of shamanism practiced in China:

- Chinese shamanism, or Wuism, the term referring specifically to the indigenous shamanic tradition of the Han Chinese, practiced by a wu
- Tongji, a Chinese spirit medium
- Chuma xian and other forms of shamanism within Northeast China folk religion
- Manchu shamanism, practiced in Northeast China
- Mongolian shamanism, practiced in Inner Mongolia
- Shamans in Ming China
- Imperial shamanism during the Qing dynasty
