= Sect =

Subgroup of a particular religious or ideological doctrine

Major denominations and religions of the world

A sect is a subgroup of a religious, political, or philosophical belief system, typically emerging as an offshoot of a larger organization. Originally, the term referred specifically to religious groups that had separated from a main body, but it can now apply to any group that diverges from a larger organization to follow a distinct set of beliefs and practices. Sects often form when there is a perception of heresy either within the subgroup or from the larger group.

In an Indian context, sect refers to an organized tradition.

== Etymology ==
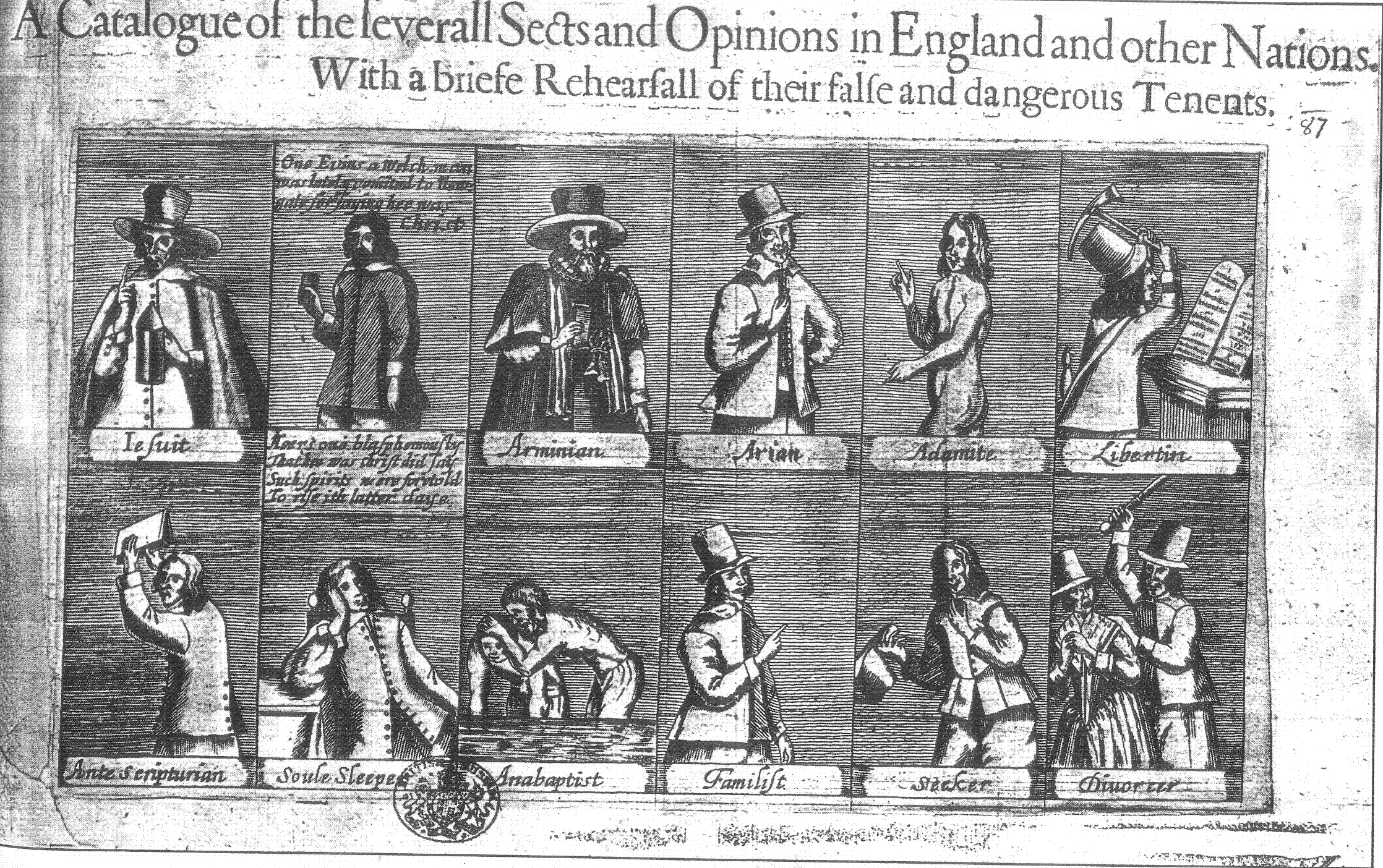
A Catalogue of the Severall Sects and Opinions in England and other Nations: With a briefe Rehearsall of their false and dangerous Tenents. Broadsheet. 1647

The word sect originates from the Latin noun secta (a feminine form of a variant past participle of the verb sequi, to follow) which translates to "a way, road". Figuratively, it signifies a (prescribed) way, mode, or manner. Metonymously, sect refers to a discipline or school of thought as defined by a set of methods and doctrines. The various modern usages of the term stem largely from confusion with the homonymous (but etymologically unrelated) Latin word secta (the feminine form of the past participle of the verb secare, to cut).

== Sociological definitions and descriptions ==
Sociologists have developed various definitions and descriptions for the term "sect." Early scholars like Max Weber and Ernst Troeltsch (1912) were among the first to define sects within the church-sect typology, viewing them as voluntary associations of individuals who meet specific religious qualifications. Unlike churches, membership in a sect is not inherited at birth; rather, it arises from a person's voluntary acceptance of the sect's doctrines and disciplines, which requires ongoing validation from both the follower and the sect itself. Sects often attract individuals from marginalized or underprivileged social groups and typically form from schisms within established churches that align with the dominant social order.

Sects frequently critique liberal trends within mainstream denominations, advocating for a return to what they view as authentic religious practices. Their beliefs and practices are usually more radical and ethically strict than those of mainstream churches, acting as a form of protest against the prevailing societal values. The American sociologists Rodney Stark and William Sims Bainbridge argue that sects present themselves as authentic, reformed versions of the faith they have separated from, maintaining a high degree of tension with the surrounding society. They further assert that sects have, in contrast to churches, a high degree of tension with the surrounding society. Other sociologists, like Fred Kniss, suggest that sectarianism is best understood through the lens of what the sect opposes. Some religious groups may be in tension primarily with other co-religious groups of different ethnic backgrounds, while others may conflict with society at large rather than the church they originally separated from.

Sectarianism in the sociology of religion, is sometimes defined as a worldview that emphasize

s the unique legitimacy of a sect's creed and practices, often heightening tension with broader society by maintaining strict boundaries.

In his book The Road to Total Freedom, the English sociologist Roy Wallis describes that a sect is characterized by "epistemological authoritarianism": meaning it has an authoritative source for determining heresy. According to Wallis, sects claim to have unique and privileged access to truth or salvation, and their followers often view those outside the group as being in error. In contrast, Wallis describes cults as being marked by "epistemological individualism,"

== In other languages ==
The corresponding words for "sect" in European languages other than English – Sekte (German), secte (French), secta (Spanish, Catalan), sectă (Romanian), setta (Italian), seita (Portuguese, Galician), sekta (Polish, Czech, Slovak, Bosnian, Croatian, Serbian, Slovenian, Latvian, Lithuanian), sekt (Danish, Estonian, Norwegian, Swedish), sekte (Dutch), sekti (Finnish), - szekda (Hungarian), секта (Russian, Serbian, Bulgarian, Ukrainian), σέχτα (Greek) – refer to a harmful religious sect and translate into English as "cult".

== In Buddhism ==
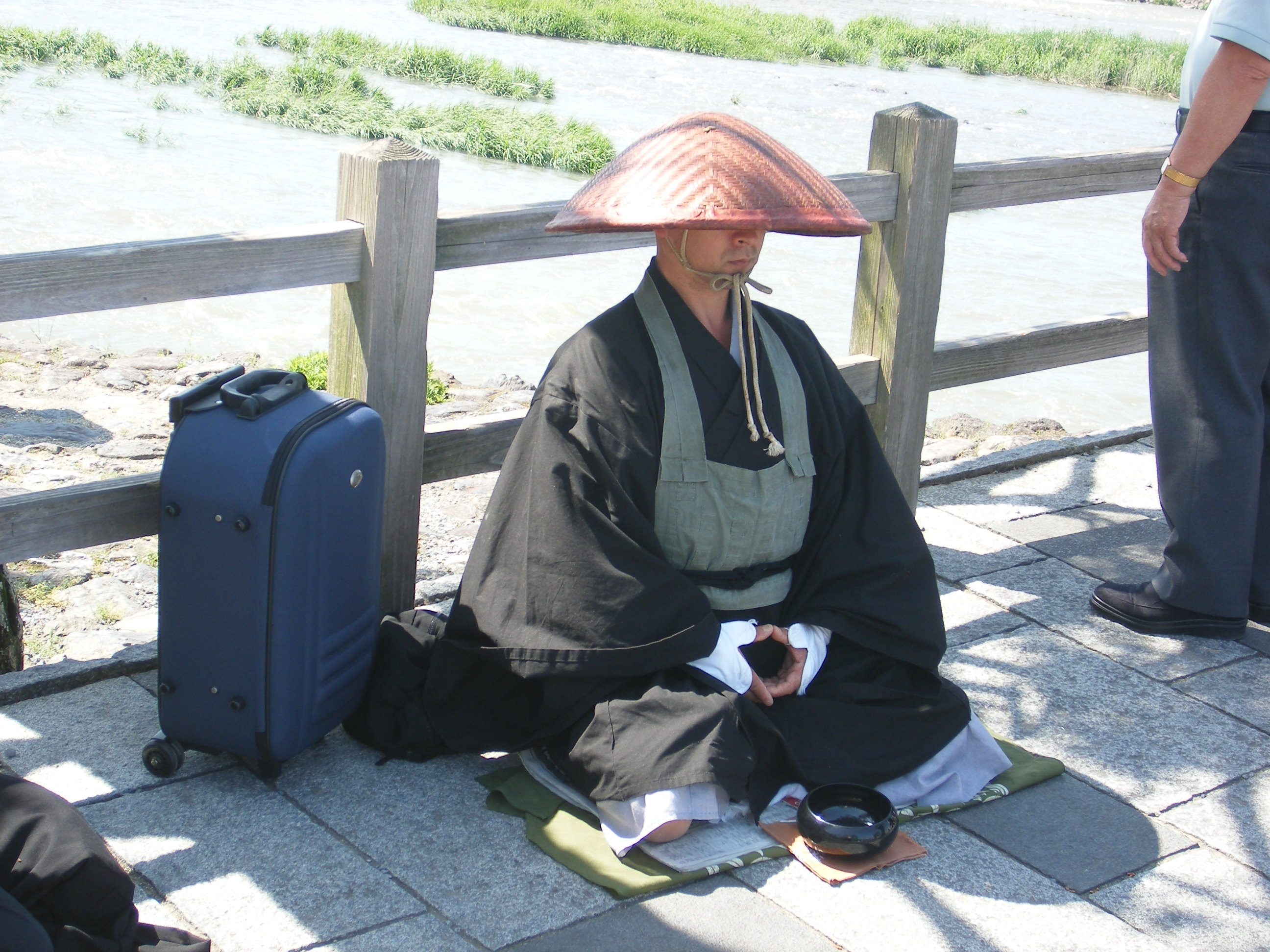
Japanese buddhist monk from the Sōtō Zen sect

The Macmillan Encyclopedia of Religion distinguishes three types of classification of Buddhism, separated into "Movements", "Nikāyas" and "Doctrinal schools":

- Schools:
  - Theravada, primarily in South Asia and Southeast Asia;
  - Mahāyāna, primarily in East Asia;
  - Vajrayāna, primarily in Tibet, Bhutan, Nepal, India, Mongolia and the Russian republic of Kalmykia.
- Nikāyas, or monastic fraternities, three of which survive at the present day:
  - Theravāda, in Southeast Asia and South Asia;
  - Dharmaguptaka, in China, Korea and Vietnam;
  - Mūlasarvāstivāda, in the Tibetan tradition;

== In Christianity ==
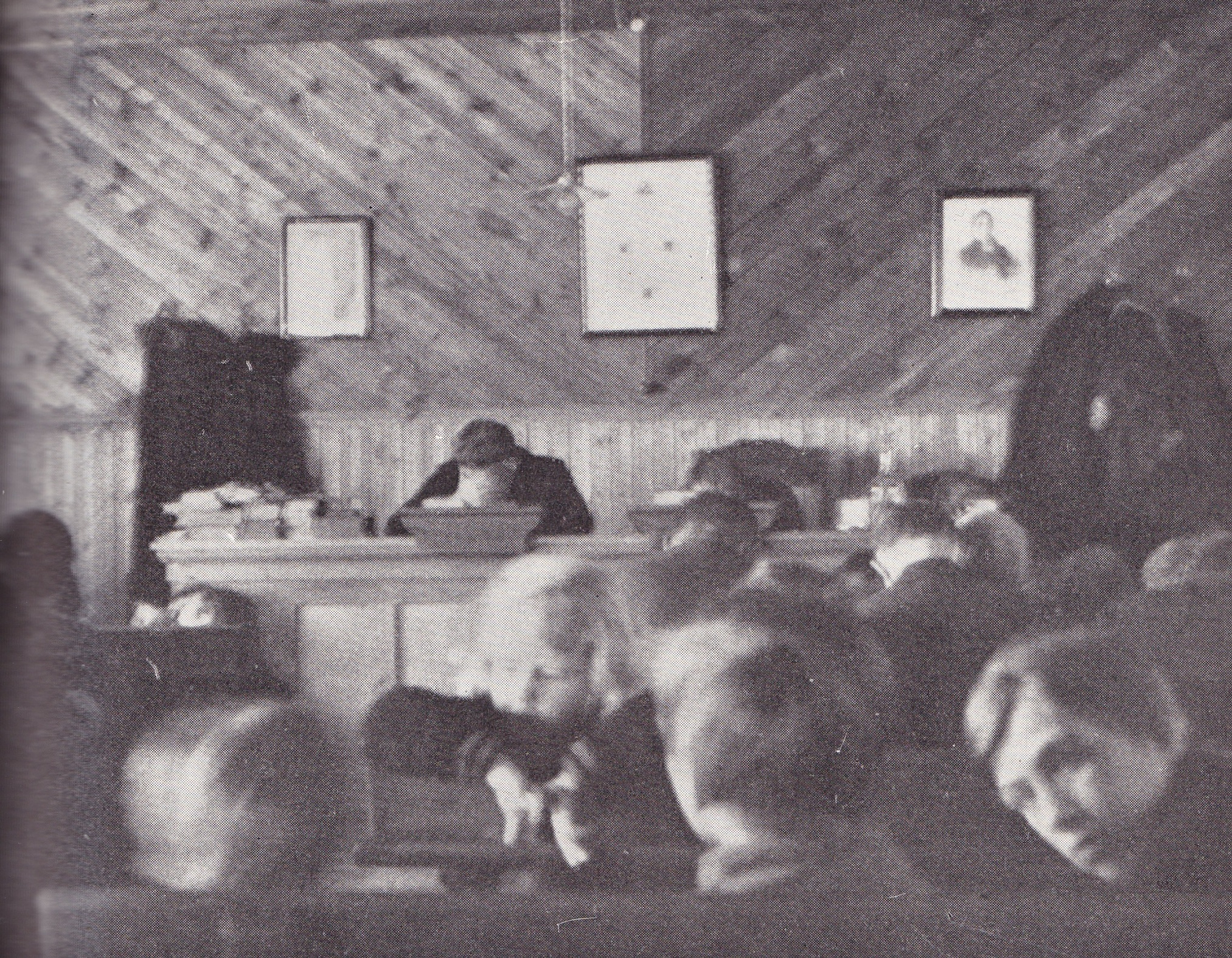
Prayer meeting of the Korpela movement in 1935

While the historical usage of the term "sect" in Christendom has had pejorative connotations, referring to a group or movement with heretical beliefs or practices that deviate from those of groups considered orthodox, its primary meaning is to indicate a community which has separated itself from the larger body from which its members came.

== In Hinduism ==
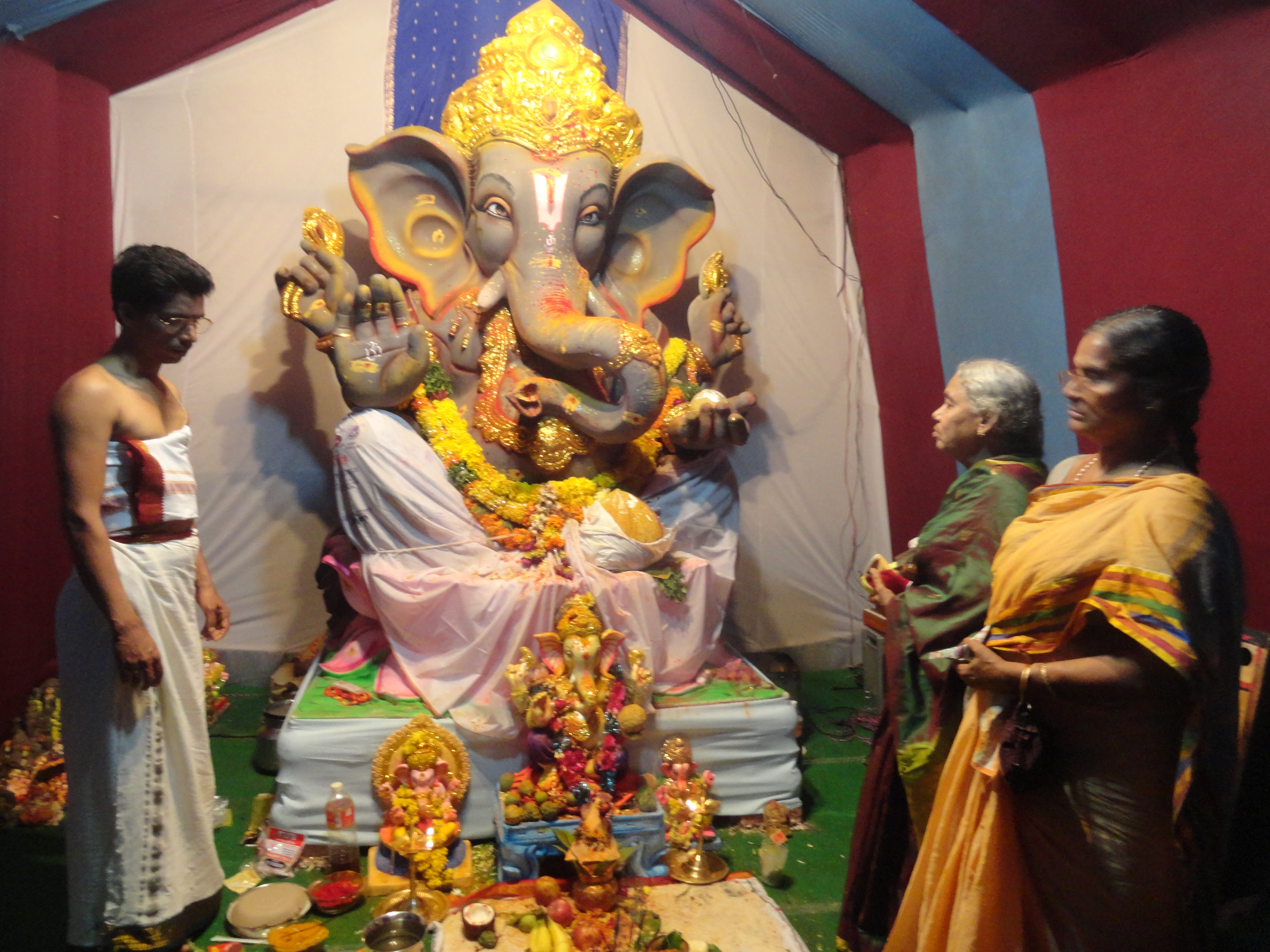
Ganesha worshippers

The Indologist Axel Michaels writes in his book about Hinduism that in an Indian context the word "sect does not denote a split or excluded community, but rather an organized tradition, usually established by founder with ascetic practices." According to Michaels, "Indian sects do not focus on heresy, since the lack of a center or a compulsory center makes this impossible – instead, the focus is on adherents and followers."

== In Islam ==
Islam was classically divided into two major sects, known as Sunni Islam and Shia Islam. Kharijite and Murijite Islam were two early Islamic sects. Each sect developed several distinct jurisprudence systems reflecting their own understanding of the Islamic law during the course of the history of Islam.

=== Current sects ===
Sunnis are separated into five maddhabs; Hanafi, Maliki, Shafi'i, Hanbali and Ẓāhirī. The Shia, on the other hand, first developed Kaysanism, which in turn divided into three major groupings known as Fivers, Seveners and Twelvers. The Zaydis separated first. The non-Zaydis were initially called "Rafida". The Rafidis later divided into two sub-groups known as Imamiyyah and Batiniyyah.

- The Romani Islam, A special brand of Islam influenced by Romani mysticism emerged in the Western Balkans among the Muslim Romani people there.
- The "Imami-Shi'a" later brought into existence Ja'fari jurisprudence. Akhbarism, Usulism, and Shaykhism were all ensued as variations of "Ja'fari fiqh", while Alawites and Alevis who are not the strict followers of "Ja'farism" are developed separately from the teachings of Ithna'ashari Imāms.
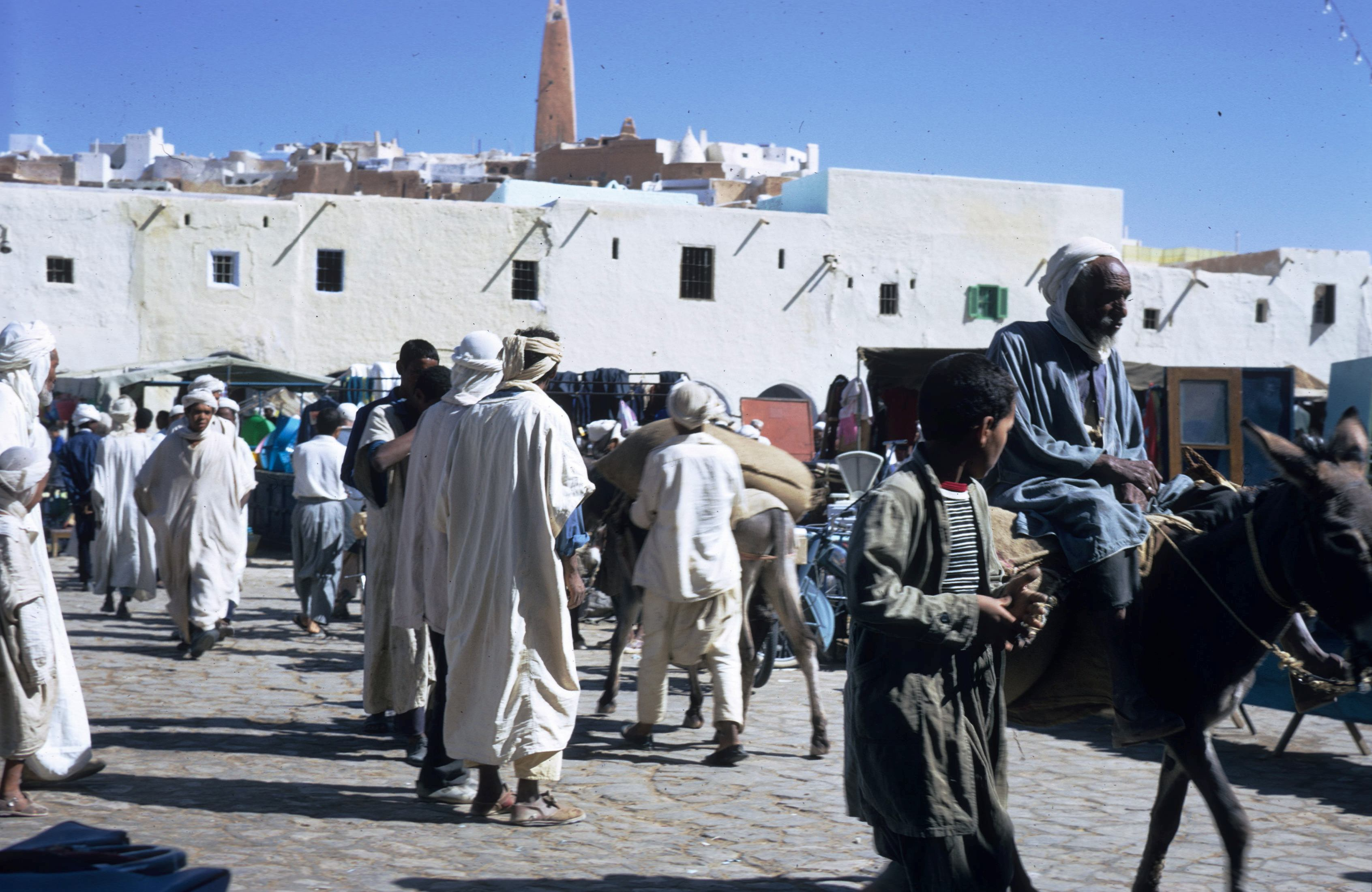
  M'zab valley in Sahara has been home of the Ibadi branch of Kharijte sect.
- Batiniyya groups, on the other hand, were divided into two sub-groups known as Seveners and Ismā'īlīs. Qarmatians who did not follow the Fatimid Caliphate were branched from the Seveners. Those groups of Batiniyya who followed the Fatimids are the ancestors of today's Ismā'īlīs. Druze was emerged as an offshoot of Ismāʿīlism at the beginning of the 11th Century. Isma'ilism at the end of the 11th Century split into two major branches known as Nizārī Ismā'īlī (Assassins of Alamut) and Musta’li Ismaili. As a result of the assassination of Fatimid Caliph Al-Amir bi-Ahkami'l-Lah, Mustaali was once more again divided into Hafizis and Taiyabi Ismailis (Dawoodis, Sulaymanis and Alavis).
- The Hanafi, Maliki, Shafi'i and Hanbali Sunnis, the Twelver groups, the Ismā'īlī groups, the Zaydis, the Ibadis, and the Ẓāhirīs continue to exist. In addition, new sects like Black Muslim movements, Quranists, Salafis, Wahhabis, Allahiyahs, and Zikris have been emerged independently.

=== Former sects ===
- The Khawarij were initially divided into five major branches: Sufris, Azariqa, Najdat, Adjarites and Ibadis.

=== Amman Message ===
An Islamic convention held in Jordan in July 2005, which brought 200 Muslim scholars from over 50 countries together, announced the official recognition of eight schools of Islamic jurisprudence and the varying schools of Islamic theology. The eight recognized Islamic schools and branches are:

1. Sunni Hanafi
2. Sunni Maliki
3. Sunni Shafi'i
4. Sunni Hanbali
5. Shi'i Imāmī (followers of the Ja'fari jurisprudence)
6. Shi'i Zaydi
7. Khariji Ibadi
8. Sunni Ẓāhirī

== See also ==
- Religious denomination
- One true church
- Religious exclusivism
- Religious pluralism
- Sectarianism
- Sectarian violence
- Non-denominational Islam
- Non-denominational Christianity
- Non-denominational Judaism
- Classifications of religious movements
- Cult
- Cult (religious practice)
- New religious movement
