= Makonde witchcraft and sorcery =

Witchcraft among the Makonde people of East Africa

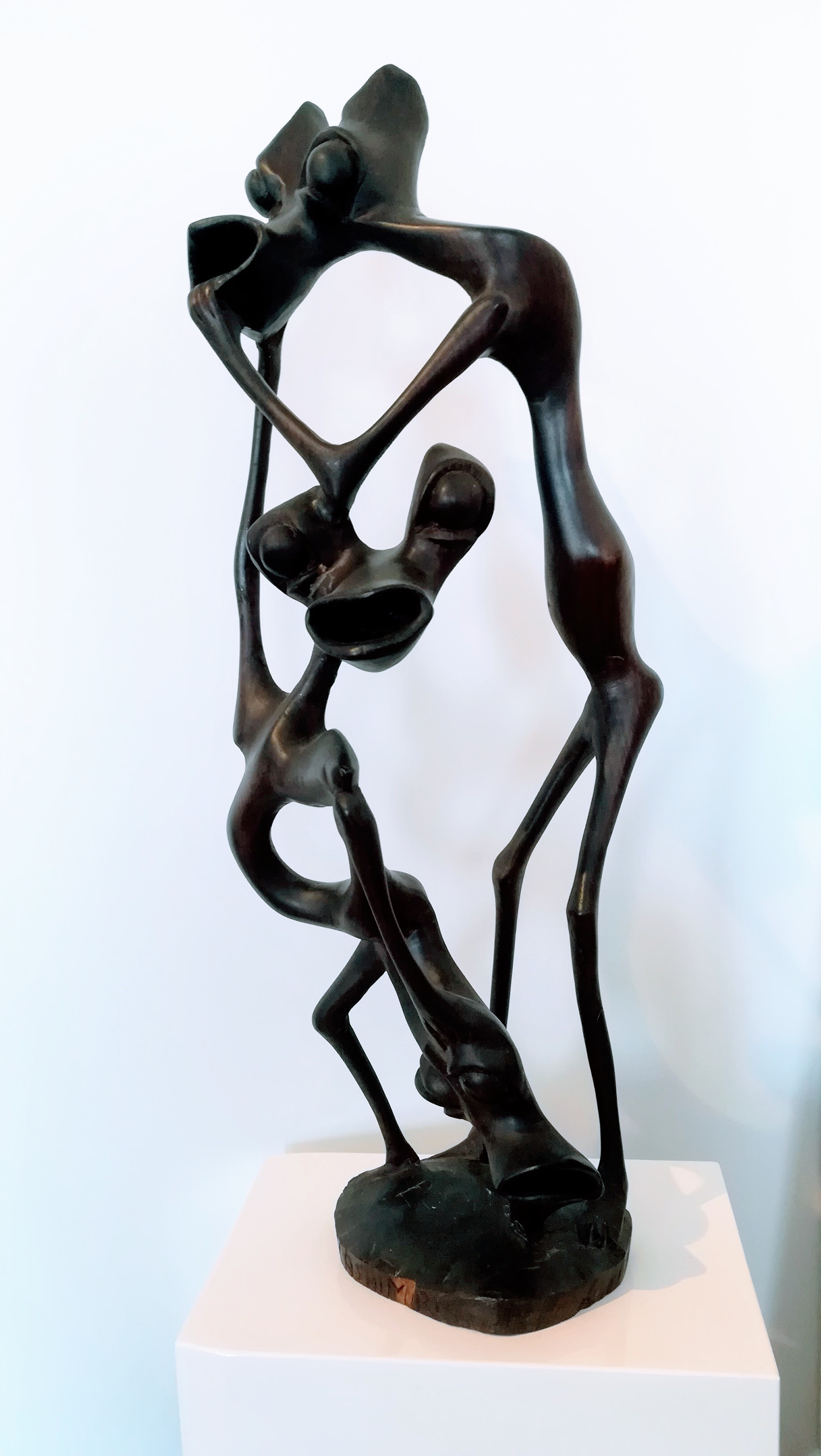
Traditional Makonde wood sculpture representing a shetani or spirit.

The Makonde people of northern Mozambique, southern Tanzania, and southeastern Kenya have a well-developed tradition of witchcraft and sorcery. Magic plays an influential role in local culture, politics and economics. Makonde sorcerers are often community leaders and are feared and respected as healers and protectors. They are frequently accused of murder and cannibalism, and are known to sometimes draw people away from seeking medical attention or contacting the police, when trust in healing and magic outweighs confidence in Western medicine or law enforcement. Recently, Makonde sorcerers have been accused of trafficking in human organs for use in the preparation of magical substances.

== History ==
The Makonde have inhabited the area around the Rovuma River for centuries. For over 200 years, they were raided by slave-traders who captured individuals for sale to Arab and Portuguese merchants, a practice which only subsided during the mid-19th century, when most European countries outlawed the slave trade. The raids led the Makonde to restrict their contact with outsiders and to fortify their settlements, preserving their language and culture.

During the Mozambican War of Independence (1964–1974), the rebel organization FRELIMO organized the Mozambican Makonde into larger communities for protection and reorganized their leadership. However, FRELIMO also attempted to prohibit "all forms of...practice associated with sorcery, including the use of magical substances, the consultation of diviners, and the supplication of ancestral spirits." This was interpreted by most Makonde to refer only destructive or harmful sorcery, and not to apply to good or beneficial sorcery. After FRELIMO took power in 1974, enforcement of the prohibition relaxed, as it became clear that sorcery was associated with social and political influence. During the Mozambican Civil War (1977–1992), Makonde sorcerers adopted the use of "magic landmines" and "magic invisible helicopters".

Until a century ago, the Makonde regarded any death or illness as the result of sorcery. Following the conversion of large numbers of Makonde to Catholicism during the 1920s, many Makonde began to believe in "God's illnesses," diseases not caused by sorcery. In Kenya and Tanzania, where many Makonde practice Islam, sorcerers incorporate texts from the Quran into their rituals. Some illnesses there are attributed to spirit possession by djinn, a concept borrowed from Arab culture.

== Types of sorcery and sorcerers ==
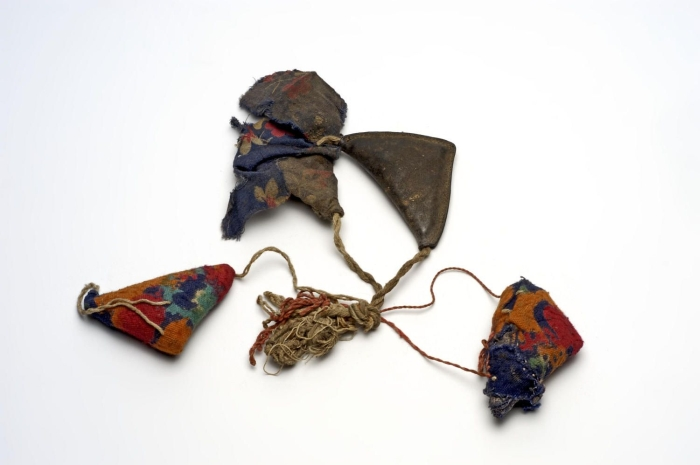
Typical amulets (dilishi) prepared and sold by Waing'anga to protect people from black magic.

The Makonde refer to anyone who performs magic or sorcery as an mwavi (pl. vavi). To become a sorcerer, a person must undergo an apprenticeship of several years with an experienced mwavi, which culminates in a shipitu, an initiation rite, after which they can practice independently. The Makonde consider magic (uwavi) as broadly divided into destructive magic, which is used to harm other people or to destroy property, and defensive or protective magic, which includes healing as well as divination. A Makonde sorcerer is capable of performing any kind of magic, although most vavi specialize in one form or another. Socerers who mainly do destructive magic usually work clandestinely and may be forced to go into hiding, to avoid attacks by other vavi or vengeance from their victims.

=== Destructive magic ===
Destructive magic is referred to as uwavi wa kujoa, ("dangerous sorcery"), or uwavi wa kunyata ("evil sorcery"), and includes uwavi wa kubyaa, or "sorcery of killing or murder" (also called uwavi wa kulogwa). It also includes uwavi wa lwanongo ("sorcery of ruin") when it is used to destroy someone's wealth or property. Makonde sorcerers can animate corpses to create mandandosha (sing. lindandosha), or zombies, to attack others or to work for the sorcerer in other ways, such as digging wells. The Makonde believe that when a sorcerer kills someone, he or she absorbs power by consuming the victim's soul (mahoka). Makonde sorcerers, even good ones, are generally believed to practice cannibalism, and that, with time, they become addicted to the taste of human flesh.

=== Defensive or protective magic ===
Defensive or protective sorcery is known as uwavi wa kulishungila ("sorcery of self-defense"). Divination, or the power to see events in the past or future, or events far away, is known as yangele. A sorcerer who specializes in identifying and destroying evil sorcerers is known as an ing'anga (pl. waing'anga). Evil sorcerers, once identified, can be neutralized by being given a drink containing nshongwe, which will explode inside them if they attempt to use magic again. Waing'anga also make and sell small amulets or pendants known as dilishi (sing. ilishi) which protect the wearer from some types of magic. A sorcerer can also turn a destructive spell around (kupilikula), so that it injures the one who cast it.

One who specializes in healing magic is known as an nkulaula (pl. vakulaula). Makonde sorcerers claim to be able to remove a deceased person's head and graft it onto a healthy body (a procedure known as takatuka), in cases where a person has suffered a fatal illness or injury. Makonde healers say they can transfer a wound from a person's body to a tree or an inanimate object (takatuka wanalyuva). Sorcery may be used to accumulate wealth or power, and this is known as uwavi wa kushunga ("sorcery of enrichment or self-advancement"). Makonde settlement leaders use sorcery of construction (uwavi wa kudenga) to build or enrich a community, and to protect it from evil or destructive magic. Sorcerers say they can transform themselves into animals, especially lions, and can order animals to perform tasks, such as spying or carrying messages.

=== Magic substances ===
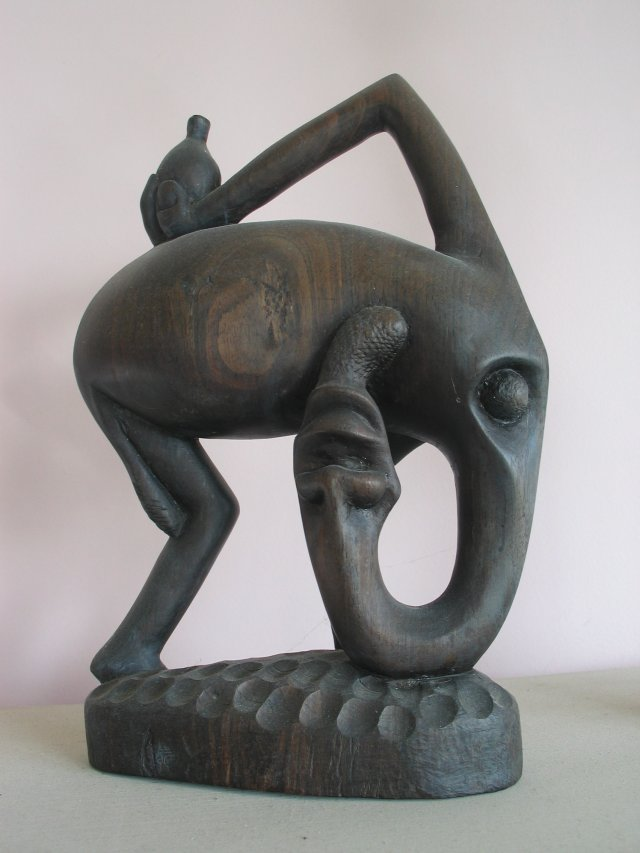
Makonde sorcerer in the process of transforming him or herself into an elephant. Note the bottle of ntela (a magic substance) in the sorcerer's left hand.

Makonde sorcerers use a variety of substances derived from animals, plants, minerals, and humans to make medicines with magic properties, known as mitela (sing. ntela). These substances can be combined to create anti-sorcery landmines (lipande) which explode when a sorcerer or his servants come near them, or mashosha, magic landmines that can kill or injure ordinary people. Mitela are also used to make the sorcerer invisible (shikupi), and in healing and divination. Some sorcerers specialize in creating and selling mitela, and these are known as vamitela (sing. muntela). Human blood, bones, and internal organs are used to create powerful spells, leading to a lucrative clandestine market in human body parts. Although mitela is mostly made from naturally occurring materials, modern Makonde sorcerers have started including man-made substances such as Orange Fanta and battery acid.

== The invisible realm ==
The Makonde believe that the world has two parallel realms: the visible realm of everyday activities, and the invisible realm (shilambo kupiya) of magic, ghosts, and spiritual phenomena. The invisible realm mirrors the visible but exists separately in opposition and contradiction to it, and it is believed to exist around and above what we see and hear in our daily lives. Makonde sorcerers use mitela to enter and work within the invisible realm, primarily through shikupi, which makes the sorcerer invisible to those in the visible realm. While employing shikupi, a sorcerer can see and communicate with ghosts and spirits (shetani) who occupy the invisible realm, and with other sorcerers who are also using shikupi. It is believed that sorcerers often inflict harm on others, including other sorcerers, while invisible due to shikupi, and that a sorcerer may transform him or herself into an invisible lion to kill and eat their victims.

== Makonde sorcery in modern times ==
As in many other countries, accusations of witchcraft in present-day Mozambique have led to vigilante justice in which suspected witches or sorcerers have been killed by angry mobs. Belief in magic has led to a clandestine trade in human organs, or human bones stolen from cemeteries. Victims of attacks by wild animals are often believed to have been attacked by sorcerers who transform themselves. People may not seek medical treatment at a hospital because they believe that magic is more effective (particularly if they also believe that illnesses are due to sorcery), or they may choose to hire a sorcerer to avenge a suspected murder rather than go to the police. Kidnapping and assaults on albinos have increased, in the belief that their internal organs have magical properties, with over 100 such assaults recorded in Mozambique since 2014. For decades, there has been an ongoing debate in Mozambique as to whether traditional practices related to healing and magic should be regulated or suppressed. Authorities in Tanzania have encouraged traditional healers to focus on herbalism rather than the supernatural, and have asked the public to seek spiritual guidance from Christian and Muslim clerics rather than private practitioners who use magic.

== See also ==
- Witchcraft in Africa
- Makonde people
- Murder for body parts
- African traditional medicine
- Traditional healers of Southern Africa
