= Baiyunzong =

Baiyunzong (Chinese: 白雲宗) was an offshoot of Huayan Buddhism which synthesized Buddhism, Confucianism, and Taoism. It is viewed by Chan Buddhism as heresy and was banned by Emperor Ningzong of the Southern Song, Ayurbarwada Buyantu, Khan of the Yuan dynasty, and the Hongwu Emperor of the Ming dynasty. They published the Buddhist canon, the Puningzang (Chinese: 普寧藏).

== See also ==
- Heterodox teachings (Chinese law)
