= Potawatomi religion =

Potawatomi religion is the traditional Native American religion of the Potawatomi people. Found primarily in north-eastern North America, it is practiced within Potawatomi communities in Canada and the United States. The tradition has no formal leadership or organizational structure and displays much internal variation.

== Definition ==
Together with the Odawa (Ottawa) and Ojibwe nations, the Potawatomi form a confederation called the Three Fires.

Native American religions more broadly have always adapted in response to environmental changes and interactions with other communities.
