= Dakota spirituality =

Faith system of the Dakota Tribe

Dakota spirituality refers to the beliefs, myths, and legends of the Dakota people of North America. This faith system is closely related to that of the Lakota, the sister tribe of the Dakota.

The largest English-language written collection of Dakota spirituality is Zitkala-Ša's Old Indian Legends. A Yankton Dakota writer, Zitkala-Ša's book compiles 14 stories from the Sioux tribes. There is also Ella Cara Deloria's Dakota Texts, a collection of Dakota myths, legends, and stories written in the Dakota language.

== Blood Clot Boy ==
Blood Clot Boy is a folk hero who appears in multiple Dakota myths. In the myth of the Badger and the Bear, a Bear family arrives to the land of the Badger and takes his wigwam. The Bear and his family threaten, displace, and starve the Badger and his family. In desperation, the Badger places the blood clot of a buffalo—all that the Bear has left behind after taking from the Badger's hunt—into a pot of boiling water and prays to the Creator. From this, Blood Clot Boy springs forth and reclaims the Badger's wigwam and food.

The title page of Dakota Texts by Ella Cara Deloria, a Dakota-language collection of myths.

In another story, Blood Clot Boy is summoned by a group that has been tormented by a Red Eagle flying overhead and preventing their hunts. Many warriors try to shoot down the eagle, but only Blood Clot Boy succeeds.
