= Living Interfaith =

Interfaith church

- Formation: 2010
- Founder: Steven Greenebaum
- Founded at: Lynnwood, Washington, United States
- Type: Interfaith movement
- Legal status: Non-profit religious organization
- Region served: International

Living Interfaith is an Interfaith movement founded by Reverend Steven Greenebaum, which embraces the teachings of all spiritual paths that lead people to seek a life of compassionate action.

Interfaith, as a faith, does not seek to discover which religion or spiritual path is "right." Rather, it recognizes that everyone is part of one family, and that at different times and in different places we have encountered the sacred differently.

== Overview ==
Living Interfaith celebrates differing spiritual paths. They claim that what is the same in every religion is the call to compassion, the call to think beyond ourselves, and the call to recognize that we are all connected. Interfaith "calls upon us not to ignore our differences, but to rather to respect them, and to realize that each of our paths, in their own special and different way, call us to love and to be loving."

The movement views Interfaith as a faith that celebrates humanity's differing spiritual paths. It believes that a person's actions in this world are what count and that humanity is called to engage the world, both with compassion and with love. A stated tenet of the movement is to respect all faith traditions and not to ignore their importance or their differences. Christianity is acknowledged as being different from Buddhism. Islam is acknowledged as being different from Humanism, and so forth. According to the movement, the claim of Interfaith as a faith is that what is the same within all of humanity's spiritual paths is the call to compassion, to thinking beyond ourselves, and to recognizing that we are all connected.

Greenebaum states that "interfaith, as a spiritual practice, can serve as a new model for how we deal with each other and a new vision for how we act on our religious beliefs to live compassionate lives and share the world in harmony."

=== The Founder ===
Rev. Steven Greenebaum, the founder of Living Interfaith, grew up as a Reform Jew in suburban Los Angeles.

He has Master's degrees in Mythology, Music, and Pastoral Studies. His experiences directing Jewish, Methodist, Presbyterian, and Interfaith choirs have helped him understand the profound wisdom of many spiritual traditions. He has dedicated his life to working for social and environmental justice through a multitude of forums. When asked about his identity, he explained: “My faith is Interfaith. My spiritual path is Judaism. My tribe is Humanity. I’m also a minister, choir director, and vegetarian.”

In 2012, he published his first book The Interfaith Alternative: Embracing Spiritual Diversity through New Society Publishers. His second book, Practical Interfaith, was published by Skylight Paths in 2014. His third book, One Family: Indivisible, was published by MSI Press in 2019. His website also contains more information about these books and his vision for Interfaith.

=== Congregations ===
==== The Living Interfaith Church ====
The Living Interfaith Church is the very first Living Interfaith congregation. It was established in 2010 by Rev. Steven Greenebaum. It is located in Lynnwood, WA, USA and is now led by Rev. Marie Preftes Arenz.

Its community members include people from the Jewish, Christian, Muslim, Buddhist, Taoist, Baha'i, Pagan, Humanist, and New Age religious traditions.

It meets on the second and fourth Saturdays of the month from September through June (except for December when it meets on the second and third Saturdays). Services start at 10:30am PDT.

At every service, a holiday or special occasion from a different spiritual tradition is celebrated.

==== The Living Interfaith Sanctuary ====
The Living Interfaith Sanctuary is the second Living Interfaith congregation. It was established in 2018 by Interfaith Leader, Cathy Merchant. It is located in Vancouver, BC, Canada.

Its community members include people from the Buddhist, Muslim, Christian, Baha'i, Jewish, Hindu, Humanist, and New Age religious traditions.

It meets on the first and third Saturdays of the month year-round. Services start at 10am PDT.

At every service, a holiday or special occasion from a different spiritual tradition is celebrated.

Its members work closely with the Multifaith Action Society, the Surrey Interfaith Council, and the Abbotsford Interfaith Movement. Its leader, Cathy Merchant, also gives presentations on Interfaith and interreligious peace-building to interested parties of other organizations, including students at the University of Nottingham in the UK.
