= Yakan movement =

Ugandan religious movement

- Leader: Rembe
- Origin: c. 1890; Uganda
- Other names: Yakani, Yakanye, Yakaŋ, Yakanye, Yakan water cult, Allah Water, Dede, Rabbinadede

Yakan, known by various other names, was a religious movement that was active in Uganda among the Lugbara people. Yakan was centered around distributing the "water of Yakan", which was infused with a psychedelic daffodil plant locally known as Kamiojo. Yakan appeared at the end of the 19th century. The group was suppressed by the British Protectorate due to allegations they had a conspiracy against colonial rule. It is most associated with a man named Rembe, who distributed the water; he was eventually executed.

== Beliefs ==
Yakan was an anti-colonial alternative medicine congregation, centered around distributing "water of Yakan", infused with a psychedelic daffodil plant locally known as Kamiojo. The drug is known to cause hallucinations, as well as feelings of elation and frenzy when taken in large amounts. Writer George Ivan Smith described it as the "LSD of Central Africa". Yakan members would perform their rites around a planted pole, called dini (a term used more broadly to refer to religion in Lugbara). The drug was distributed by individuals seen as having charismatic powers, who were believed to be able to combat harmful forces; members who drank Kamiojo were believed to be protected from sickness, and they believed that bullets that were shot at them would turn to harmless water.

The group has also been described as primarily wishing for independence, with Jack Driberg saying the medical aspect was secondary to the desire for revolution among the members. The group went by various names, among them the Yakan, Yakani, Yakanye. It was also called Dede, with Rembe calling it the Rabbinadede (a combination of Dede and an Arabic word for god).

== History ==
The time period of 1890-1919 was difficult for the Lugbara people, with several raids from other groups and epidemics occurring. This in combination with colonialism and its resulting invasions led to social strife and instability.

The Yakan likely formed towards the end of the 19th century, particularly in 1890. The group was associated with a Kakwa man named Rembe. He led to a resurgence in the group. Rembe was described as "sexually ambiguous"; he divined in the manner of the women and was sometimes seen as having female attributes, and never had sex with any women. Researcher John Middleton said he saw some indications that Rembe was a homosexual. Lugbara later said he was "not really a man" and therefore had womanly attributes. Rembe had obtained the water from a man named Lagoro (or Lagaru or Logworo), who obtained it from the chief of the Mundu, Magoro. Rembe and Lagoro distributed the water.

Rembe claimed he was possessed by the Yakan spirit, which gave him the ability to control the amoral forces of the world; he said that the elders of their society were no longer capable of this, as evidenced by the presence of sickness. John Middleton, who studied the group, argued that Rembe had been trying "to rid the Lugbara of their traditional form of social organisation, that of the segmentary lineage system, and also of the cult of the dead associated with it", while scholar Tim Allen argued he seemed to have been "trying to forge a new social order". The administration of the Protectorate of Uganda first encountered the Yakan group in 1919, in the West Nile District, during World War I, during periods of significant conflict related to the movement; the authorities knew it as the "Allah Water Cult". By the time of its discovery by colonial authorities some believed it had already had an impact on neighboring ethnic groups.

The movement was repressed by British colonial authorities who judged it as a "coordinated conspiracy" and challenge against their rule. The British viewed the Yakan as being a source of the resistance to forced labor, sending troops with machine guns in to disrupt the "rebellion". They also deported 15 chiefs (who were first appointed by colonial forces), before deporting eight more the next year; the evidence for doing this was disputed, and the Attorney General of the Protectorate of Uganda eventually concluded that there was no evidence of anything beyond the fact that "'Allah Water' appears to be a particularly intoxicating drink". However, the Attorney General was overruled and they were deported anyway. Rembe was executed by colonial authorities. Rembe was succeeded by his assistant, a man named Yondu.

By the 1960s, the more political aspects of the Yakan were eliminated, and its remainders were only found in household practice, and Middleton noted it was infrequently brought up with Europeans due to government disapproval. Soldiers were especially drawn to the group, and even after it was politically constrained members of the King's African Rifles regiments incorporated its elements.

== Legacy ==
Ugandan dictator Idi Amin's mother, Aate, was a member of the group. The Yakan movement was later described as having an effect on Amin's preferred types of torture techniques. The Amin family instead claimed that "the Yakanye Order" was an African secret society that used magic to start and win wars.

The group has been remembered as a colonial resistance group. Scholar Tim Allen argued its importance was exaggerated, and that it was merely "one of many overlapping spirit possession cults" that resulted from the social strife of the time. John Middleton however argued that "to-day all older men in northern and eastern Lugbara (it was less important in the south and west) know about it and remember its greater days in detail. In discussion with them I have been left in no doubt as to the immense importance of this cult for the Lugbara". Rembe was later mythicized by the Lugbara, seen as a prophet.
