= Theistic humanism =

Combination of humanistic ideals

Theistic humanism is the combination of humanistic ideals, particularly the idea that ideals and morals stem from society, with a belief in the supernatural and transcendental.

It is frequently invoked as a form of spiritual opposition to monotheism.

== In African philosophy ==
In Southern Africa, indigenous humanism is popularly associated with the Ubuntu philosophy, and its fusion with Traditional African religion is often referred to as Theistic Humanism. Ubuntu asserts that society, not a transcendent being, gives human beings their humanity. This form of theistic humanism has frequently been associated with opposition to globalisation.
