= Samaritan Christians =

The early relationship between Samaritans and Christianity is murky.

According to the New Testament book of Acts, Philip the Evangelist conducted a mission in Samaria and significantly increased the number of Christian believers there. This was followed by the apostolic visitation of Peter and John, who were sent by the elders in Jerusalem to lay hands upon the baptized Samaritans so that they would receive the Holy Spirit.

By the end of the second century CE, the original Samaritan Christian community had disbanded and was lost to history.

== Role of Samaritans in Christianity ==
From the story of the Samaritan woman at the well to the parable of the Good Samaritan, Samaritans were very much a part of Early Christianity. While Jesus instructed his disciples not to go to the Samaritans, he dealt with the Samaritans directly, and referenced them in his teachings.

=== Prochorus ===
A nephew of Stephen and one of the original Seven Deacons of the Jerusalem Church, Prochorus played an important role in the development of early Christianity among Jewish and Samaritan converts. After his uncle's martyrdom, Roman and Jewish violence toward Christians increased and eventually led to the dispersion of the Christian community at Jerusalem. Christian tradition holds that Prochorus gave aid to the Apostle Peter in his mission work and went on to become a close companion and personal scribe for the Apostle John, penning various letters and books for him, including his Gospel and his Revelation. Prochorus met a martyr's death in Antioch at the end of the first century AD.

=== Later Samaritan Christians and modern revival efforts ===
Nothing of the original Samaritan Christian community remains, but Samaritans continued to convert to Christianity at different times during the centuries that followed the spread of Christianity throughout Rome. A great number of conversions were forced on account of persecution, which ultimately led to the assimilation and disappearance of the Byzantine Samaritan diaspora and the near annihilation of Samaritans in the Levant.
