= Temple of the Vampire =

New Religious Movement based on Vampirism and the Vampiric subculture

- Type: New religious movement
- Classification: Western Esoteric spirituality
- Orientation: Occultism, Transhumanism, Western esotericism
- Scripture: The Vampire Bible
- Theology: Vampirism
- Polity: Hierarchical
- Headquarters: Tacoma, Washington (known active cabals in U.S., UK, and Australia)
- Founder: George C. Smith (Adept Nemo/Lucas Martel)
- Origin: 1989; United States
- Members: Unknown (active international membership)
- Official website: http://templeofthevampire.com/

The Temple of the Vampire is a modern new religious movement founded in the late 1980s by George C. Smith, a member of the Church of Satan, that integrates Western esoteric traditions with the metaphor of vampirism and its subculture as a path immortality. The Temple’s central text, The Vampire Bible, articulates a belief system known as the "religion of Vampirism," wherein members—self-identified as Vampires—pursue mastery of magical and worldly disciplines to attain wealth, health, influence, and ultimately physical immortality.
