= Denomination =

Denomination may refer to:

- Religious denomination, such as a:
  - Christian denomination
  - Jewish denomination
  - Islamic denomination
  - Hindu denominations
  - Buddhist denomination
- Denomination (currency)
- Denomination (postage stamp)
- Protected designation of origin, a protected product name, usually by region of production
