= Faizrakhmanist =

The Faizrakhmanist of Fäyzraxmançılar (Tatar: Фәйзрахманчылар) movement, known in the media as the "catacomb sect", is a sect of Islam based in Tatarstan, Russia. Adherents describe themselves only as Muammmin ("believers"). The sect is named after its founder, Faizrakhman Sattarov, a Russian Muslim who calls himself a prophet. The sect is considered illegitimate by mainstream Russian Muslim clergy because orthodox Islam holds that there are no prophets after Muhammad.

== Founding and beliefs ==
Sect founder Faizrakhman Sattarov, who was at one time a mufti, presented himself as a prophet in the mid-1960s after he encountered sparks from a trolleybus cable and interpreted the sparks as a divine light from God. He established the sect in the 1970s. The sect is relatively small, with about 70 members. Sattarov and his followers are rejected by mainstream Islamic clergy, who hold Muhammad as the final prophet of Allah.

In 1996, Sattarov moved into a three-storey building in Kazan that he declared to be an independent Islamic state. The sect established a madrassa (religious school) in 1997, allowing only its sect members to preach to the students. Instead of using orthodox Islamic scripture, the textbooks used are written and often copied and adapted by Sattarov himself.

=== Separatism ===
The Faizrakhmanists stress their native roots and lack of association with other Russian and worldwide Islamic organizations. The sect is believed to reject the modern Russian state and its laws, as well as mainstream and orthodox Islam. In the first decade of the 21st century, Sattarov led his followers into isolation from mainstream society, pursuing an extreme version of religious separatism.

== Underground compound discovery and raid ==
In August 2012, during an investigation of attacks on Muslim clergy in Tatarstan, Russian police found an eight-level complex of underground chambers beneath Sattarov's home in Kazan, occupied by 38 adults and 27 children who lived in dug-out rooms described as being like catacombs. According to Russian authorities, most of the children had never been outside their underground home, but adult members of the sect said the children were able to play outdoors.

Most sect members were forbidden to leave the compound, although a few were permitted to leave in order to work as traders in a local marketplace. One man who lived in the underground complex with his family told news media that he had defied the restrictions to go to a job outside, escaping by jumping over the gate.

Four members of the Faizrakhmanist sect were charged with cruelty against children. Authorities said the children had been living in poorly ventilated unsanitary quarters and that they displayed symptoms of anaemia and tuberculosis, Sattarov was charged with "arbitrariness", a criminal offence defined in Article 330 of the Russian penal code to mean "unauthorised commission of actions contrary to the order presented by a law or any other normative legal act". The penalty for arbitrariness is up to five years in prison. Sattarov's three-storey brick house, located on a 700 m^{2} (7,500 sq ft) lot, was found to have been constructed illegally and was ordered to be demolished. Sect members said they would combat the demolition by "throw[ing] [them]selves in front of the bulldozers".

At the time of the discovery of the catacombs, Sattarov was reported to be 83 years old, ill, and confined to his bed in a state of delirium.
