= Fugara =

Shaman or people with supernatural powers in Bedouin shamanism

Fugara or Fuqara are shaman or people with supernatural powers in Bedouin shamanism. Fugara means 'weak' as these individuals are known to avoid heavy meals. They are masters of desert mysticism and are believed to have access to the spiritual realm. They provide advice, teaching or spiritual insight to entire tribes, along with tending to the sick.

"Fugara" are initiated when they are young, sometimes as young as 14 years old. The nomadic bedouin Shamans assumes a socio-religious function within the community. The shaman may fill the role of priest or sheik, metaphysician or healer.

Bedouins Shamans use many plants for medical purposes and spiritual rites. Harmala, mixed with incense, is used for curing people possessed by the jinn, a treatment that often includes the beating of drums and the recitation of Koranic verses. Drumming, manipulating of breath, ordeals, fasting, theatrical illusions, all are time-honored methods for entering into the trance for shamanic work.

Zikr, simply translated as "divine remembrance", is also practiced as a method to cure mental or physical illness. It is performed by repeating holy verses or God's attributes individually. The shaman combines the using of God's attributes and holy verses with prayer in a specific and complex method.

The formulation, called "wifq", may be written on paper, bone, or leather and is placed in a glass of water (to be taken by the patient), buried in the ground, or carried around by the patient. The formulations can also be spoken aloud, in the heart, or using many other ways. This can be applied not only to cure mental or physica illness, but also to solve family, financial, or social problems. This last method uses power from God for constructive purposes only, and is not similar to voodoo, black magic, or witchcraft, which use the power from jinn or evil spirits for destructive purposes.

Bedouins believe supernatural phenomena affects their life significantly, such as the intervention of superhuman entities, be they gods or demons. These entities are divided into three categories: ancestors, the gods, and the djin or Jinn.

Jinn are said to have come the Earth ages before man existed. They were the first of Earth's masters. They built huge cities whose ruins still stand in forgotten places. Aeons later many Jinn were forced to flee the Earth while other were imprisoned. Still others roam desolate places to this day. The Jinn are said to be invisible to normal men.

== See also ==
- Fakir
