= Lingnan Confucianism =

Confucian schools of thought in southern China

Lingnan Confucianism (Cantonese Jyutping: Ling5 naam4 jyu4 hok6; Traditional Chinese: 嶺南儒學) refers to the Confucian schools of thoughts in Lingnan - the Southern Chinese provinces of Guangdong and Guangxi. These schools are primarily formed by Cantonese people, who have traditionally been the dominant demographic in the region.

== Schools of thoughts ==
=== Guk-bo school ===
Guk-bo school (Jyutping: Guk1 bo1 hok6 paai3; Traditional Chinese: 菊坡學派) is the first Confucian school in the history of Lingnan. It originated in 12th century, founded by the Zengcheng-born philosopher Chui Yu-zi (崔與之). He discussed his views on varied matters, including politics and military, establishing the foundation for Lingnan philosophy.

=== Lingnan scholarly school ===
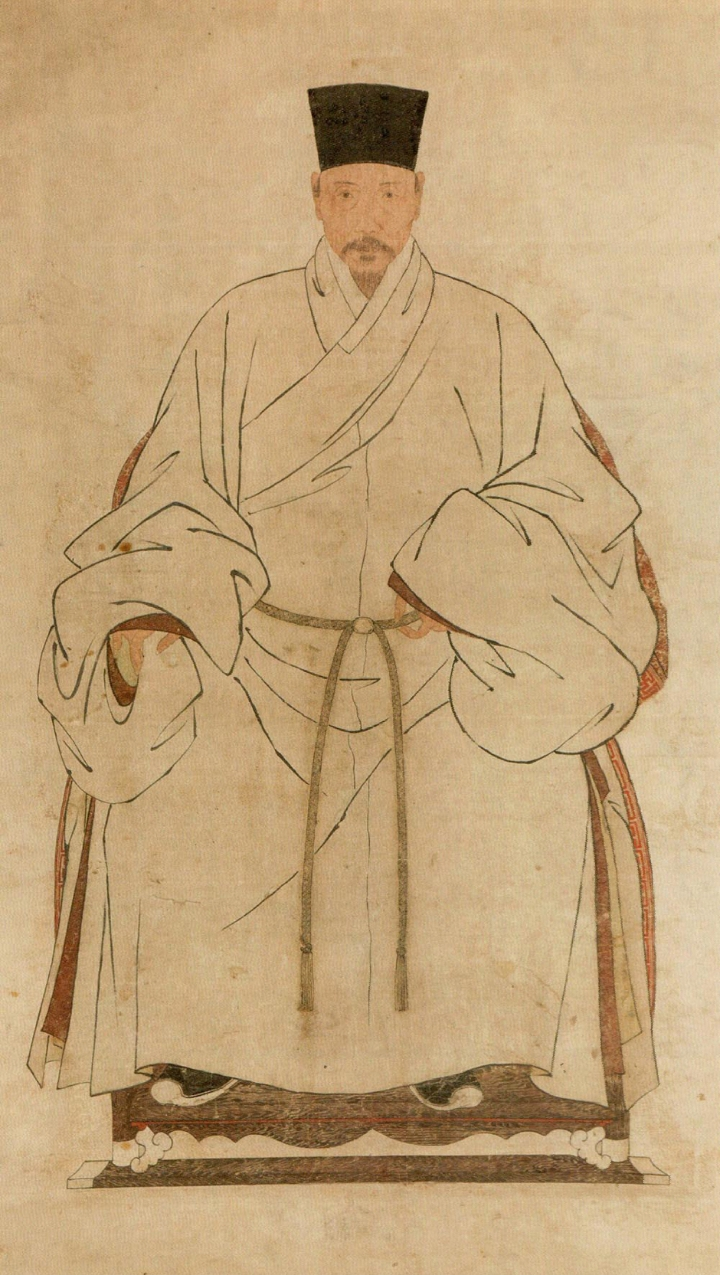
The portrait of Chan Bak-sa ("Chen Baisha" in Mandarin)

Lingnan scholarly school (Jyutping: Ling5 naam4 hok6 paai3; Traditional Chinese: 嶺南學派) is the most prominent of schools of Neo-Confucian thoughts in Lingnan. It was started by a group of Cantonese Confucian scholars in 15th century, led by Chan Bak-sa. Chan's writings have now been compiled in a document titled "Chan Bak-sa's Collection" (Jyutping: Can^{4} hin^{3} zoeng^{1} zaap^{6}; Traditional Chinese: 陳獻章集). In this series of writings, Chan expressed his opinions of Confucius's thoughts and reinterpreted them through the lens of Mahayana Buddhism and Taoism. His main ideas include: (1) the belief that, for all of the world's non-human beings, their values depend primarily on the subjectivity of humans; He argued that values are given solely by humans, and without humans' subjective thoughts, all of the world's non-human entities would be meaningless; (2) the belief that doubt is the source of enlightenment; Chan once said that "學貴知疑，小疑則小進，大疑則大進，疑者覺悟之機也。" (Classical Chinese: "The most valuable thing about learning is to know doubt. With small doubt comes small progress. With great doubt comes great progress. Doubt is the opportunity of enlightenment."); (3) the advocate for use of certain Buddhist and Taoist rituals as a way of self-training; For instance, he suggested that Buddhist meditation is a good way to train the mind, though some of Chan's disciples were not very fond of this particular idea. As a whole, this style of thoughts has a strong theme of humanism and individualism. It also appeared to have been influenced by Western style of thoughts in its belief in more rational ways of thinking than older Confucian thoughts.

=== Gum-cyun school ===
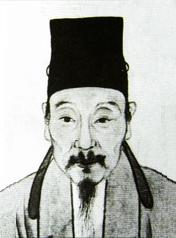
The portrait of Zam Yoek-sui.

Gum-cyun school (Jyutping: Gam1 cyun4 hok6 paai3; Traditional Chinese: 甘泉學派) was founded by Zam Yoek-sui, a Cantonese philosophy from 15th century and disciple of Chan Bak-sa. Zam sought to link together the thoughts of Confucius, Mencius, and several other Confucian schools of thoughts. He advocated that morality and conscience lie in the "heart", and that moral development should rely on "self-restraint" (克己).

== See also ==
- Confucianism
- Lingnan culture
- Chinese philosophy
- Korean Confucianism
