= Afro-Chinese religion in Cuba =

Chinese community influence on Cuban religion

Cuban Afro-Chinese religion is a variant of Santería. It is a syncretic religion that was created by the religious and cultural beliefs of the large number of Chinese immigrants in Cuba in the late 19th century.

== Historical background ==
In the mid-19th century, with the arrival of a large number of Chinese workers (mainly indentured laborers) in Cuba, Chinese religious beliefs were also introduced. These Chinese workers mainly came from Guangdong and Fujian. They brought their own traditional beliefs and established temples and altars in Cuba's Chinatown, which became the spiritual sustenance of the Chinese community. In the 1830s, some Chinese came to Cuba from the Philippines (another Spanish colony) through the Manila Galleon Trade. Starting in 1847, a large number of Chinese from the mainland came to Cuba, some of whom were deceived or kidnapped ("sold pigs"), and worked on Cuba's sugar plantations and other industries with enslaved Africans under onerous eight-year indentured labor contracts. From 1847 to 1874, about 125,000 Chinese arrived in Cuba, which was the "coolie trade" period. The Chinese who survived the eight-year contract usually stayed in Cuba, either voluntarily or because they could not afford the travel expenses to return to China. Many started small businesses in Cuban cities, towns and cities.

The Cuban Chinese community grew in the late 1800s with the arrival of "Californians", Chinese who left the United States due to discrimination and racism there; many Californians were businessmen who injected capital into the community.

There were few women among the Chinese in Cuba, and relationships with non-Chinese Cuban women, especially black and mixed-race Cuban women, led to many mixed-race descendants. It is for this reason that the Chinese in Cuba and their culture did not form a clear and relatively closed community, but gradually influenced and integrated with the religious culture of other communities with intermarriage with other ethnic groups, especially Afro-Cubans.

== Specific impacts on Cuban religion ==
=== Guan Gong/San Fan Con ===
Guan Gong, also known as Guan Yu, is a heroic deity. He was a general during the Three Kingdoms period in the late Eastern Han Dynasty and is said to have died in 219 AD. He was deified centuries after his death and became a deity in folk religious beliefs.

Guan Gong beliefs have the deepest roots in southern China, including some places with a long immigration tradition in Guangdong and Fujian (the main source of immigrants). Guan Gong is regarded as the embodiment of loyalty, integrity, and bravery, and is called the God of War. He is often depicted in lightning and thunder. At the same time, he is also associated with business activities. The Chinese first prayed to Guan Gong to protect them from bullying, and later, as Chinese business prospered, they began to pray to Guan Gong to protect their property and bless them with abundant wealth.

In Cuba, people call Guan Gong "San Fancón". The formation of this name is quite instructive. It can be inferred that the Spanish pronunciation of "gong" is CON, and the pronunciation of the standard Cantonese "guan" is roughly the same as Mandarin. Most of the early Cantonese immigrants to Cuba were from Taishan. In Taishan dialect, "guan" is pronounced as "fan", and this spelling was established and preserved in the 19th century. In the Catholic environment of Cuba, Chinese believers of Guan Gong once gave Guan Gong the title of "God". The pronunciation of "God" in Cantonese is similar to "san" in Spanish. Remove the ending sound of "santo" (saint) to become "san". This gave rise to the Spanishized Cantonese name "San Fancón". This word is compatible with the Spanish phonology, where con is a common suffix. San Fancón is a deity unique to Cuba.

Cuban blacks incorporate Guan Gong into Santería, and they regard Guan Gong as a deity of the Yoruba religious system, Changó". Cuban anthropologist Israel Moliner believes that San Fancón was created by Marcos Portillo Domínguez, a Santeria priest with Cantonese and black ancestry.

=== Guanyin (Avalokitesvara) ===
Another widely worshipped deity in overseas Chinese communities is Guanyin, "who observes the voices of the people in the world". In Cuba, people combine Guanyin with Lady of Mercy, who is equivalent to the Santeria goddess Ochún. Ochún lives in rivers and represents the cosmic power of river water. Lady of Mercy first appeared in the Bahía de 1606. Nipe. Two native and a black child found her idol during a storm. Our Lady of Mercy holds the mulatto baby Jesus in one hand and a cross in the other, and is dressed in a golden robe. Racially, she is a mixture of black, white and Native people.

Olga Portuondo Zúniga, a Cuban expert on the Virgin, believes that the original idol was a Santeria wooden statue, probably Ochún, because it was found floating on the water. Ochún, Guanyin and Our Lady of Mercy are linked together because of their connection to the sea and water, and because they are all incarnations of love and motherhood.
