= Shinmei Aishinkai =

Japanese new religious movement

Shinmei Aishinkai (神命愛心会) is a Japanese new religious movement founded by Komatsu Shin'yō in 1976. Komatsu was born in Yokohama in 1928; her mother was the successor to a hereditary line of kannushi (Shinto priests). In 1976, an acquaintance of Komatsu's made a prophecy that a kami was about to descend to Earth. Shortly thereafter, Komatsu was visited in turn by a dragon god, Kannon and Amaterasu, the sun goddess. From that time forward, Komatsu dedicated herself to passing on knowledge from Amaterasu.

== Faith and practices ==
The Shinmei Aishinkai movement became an official religious organization in 1983. The focus of the movement's practices are ritual purification (okiyome or osame) meant to give ascension to the spirits or jaki of departed people which are still bound to the earth. By doing so, the group hopes to ensure peace and prosperity throughout the world. To that end, rituals have been held following such events as the fall of the Berlin Wall and the September 11 attacks. The movement's main festival, Kamiyo Gyōretsu "Whole World Procession", is held in autumn at the main Tokyo shrine and includes a parade in which members dress in period clothing and proceed through the city.

The five main gods worshipped by followers are Amaterasu, Takemikazuchi, Ninigi-no-Mikoto, Kannō, and Ame-no-tajikarao. However, others such as Ame-no-Uzume-no-Mikoto are also regularly worshipped.

The Shinmei movement, like many Shinto-derived new religious movements includes a strong emphasis on divination and Wu Xing practices, known as kigaku. This includes the study of kasō, the floor plan of one's house and the influences of energy drawn from various compass directions and shares some similarities with feng shui. The group also has strong ties to Ise Grand Shrine (Mie Prefecture), where the goddess Amaterasu is believed to reside.

As of 2008, the group has approximately 50,000 members nationwide. Branch shrines have been established in Hokkaido, Kyushu, Nasu (Tochigi Prefecture), and Hyōgo Prefecture. The main shrine is located in Tokyo.
