= Soul eater (folklore) =

Folklore figure in Nigeria

A soul eater is a folklore figure in the traditional belief systems of some groups, known for sucking or eating the souls of their victims.

Soul eaters can be related to witchcraft, zombies, and other similar phenomena. One Choctaw story about Nalusa Chito, also known as a Impa Shilup, features a soul eater with the ability to eat souls directly.

Some traditional religions, including that of ancient Egypt and the Chickasaw, Choctaw, and Natchez of North America, contain figures whose names have been translated into English as "soul eater".

The concept of the soul eater also exists in Greek mythology, These types of mythological figures, however, are spiritual and not human beings, and so are distinctly different from the soul eater as conceptualized by the Hausa and some others.

The traditional belief in soul eaters has been adopted by a range of modern horror fiction and fantasy writers, contemporary songwriters, and anime and video game creators.

== Examples ==
=== Hausa ===
In Hausa belief, the desire and capacity for the practice of witchcraft (maita) is rooted in deep contention and superstition. The Hausa also believe that witches (maye) are capable of seeing, catching, and eating souls. Witches were believed to be able to put human souls into animals, then slaughter said animals to kill the soul. The soul eater can take the form of a dog or other animal, in pursuit of his or her practice.

Jerome H. Barkow states "A Maye is a witch or soul-eater, a man who is believed to hunger for souls. He can at will bring up from his stomach colored pebbles or granules (Kankara). The Hausa believe that one is born a maye, and the power to use witchcraft is inherited. Customers pay the maye for kankara, and if they ingest these granules, they then become a maye. When a maye eats a soul, the body of the victim will slowly grow sick and die.

Some elements of the Hausa belief in soul eaters survived into African-American folklore of the United States and that of the Caribbean region. Related beliefs can be found in other traditional African cultures, like the Fulbe and the Serer, as well as among the groups of the Mount Hagen area of Papua New Guinea. The hix or ix of the Maya and related peoples is a comparable figure; the Pipil term teyollocuani translates literally as "soul eater".

=== Ammit ===
Iain Bamforth discusses how the Egyptian deity Ammit resides in the underworld and consumes people/souls. Anubis would take the heart of a person in the afterlife and weigh it on the scales of justice. If the heart doesn't weigh down the scales, then they can carry on in the afterlife, but if the heart appears heavy and filled with burdens, then it is to be fed to Ammit, therefore giving the heart a second death and no admittance into immortality with Osiris.

Jaques De Ville writes "she (Ammit) appears on top of and her feather on one side of the scale against which the heart of the deceased is weighed to establish whether he is to die a second death by being devoured by Ammit, or may proceed to the afterlife."

=== Cerberus ===
In Greek and Roman mythology, Hades' three headed dog, Cerberus, was a protector of the underworld. He guarded the doors to the underworld so ruthlessly that anyone other than Hades who tried to enter through them was eaten by the dog, and any soul that tried to leave the underworld was consumed or destroyed by the hound as well.

=== Makonde ===
The Makonde people of Mozambique, Tanzania, and southeastern Kenya believe that sorcerers (vavi, singular uwavi) consume the souls (mahoka) of people they have killed, in order to make themselves more powerful. In many cases, the sorcerers engage in cannibalism so as to absorb the soul of the deceased.
