= Theopanism =

Concept that God and the universe are one

Theopanism (from Greek: Θεός Theos, "God" and πᾶν pan, "all") is a religious term by which, as one author puts it, "the meaning given the word God is of an entity that is not separate from the universe."

[O]ne may distinguish pantheism, which imagines the world as an absolute being ("everything is God"), from theopanism, which conceives of God as the true spiritual reality from which everything emanates: "God becomes everything", necessarily, incessantly, without beginning and without end. Theopanism is (with only a few other dualistic systems) the most common way in which Hindu philosophy conceives God and the world.

Theopanism includes among its major concepts pantheism and panentheism.

== See also ==
- God becomes the Universe
- Pandeism
- Spiritual naturalism
- Baruch Spinoza
- Universal Pantheist Society
