= Taigu school =

Mystical folk religious sect of Confucianism

The Taigu school (Chinese: 太谷学派; pinyin: Tàigǔ xuépài), also Great Perfection (大成教; Dàchéng jiào) or Yellow Cliff teaching (黄崖教; Huángyá jiào), is a mystical folk religious sect of Confucianism spread especially in Jiangsu, Anhui and Shandong. It was founded by Zhou Xingyuan, a man with shamanic skills entitled Taigu (太谷; "Great Valley") by followers.

The purpose of the school is to help those who practice it to develop a clear and enlightened state of mind, in which man apprehends his true nature and recovers original simplicity.

== See also ==
- Confucianism
- Chinese folk religion

== Sources ==
- Ma, Xisha; Huiying Meng (2011). Popular Religion and Shamanism § "The Taigu School and the Yellow Cliff Teaching: Another Case of Transformation from Confucian Academic Group to Religious Sect". Brill. ISBN 978-9004174559.
- Jiang, Feng (2007). "Taigu School: Folk Confucian School Entering into the Horizon of Cultural Studies". Philosophical Trends (12): 23–26, 37.
