= Shamans in Ming China =

Shamanism (wushu 巫術) in China can be traced back to the early Shang dynasty. During the Shang dynasty, it was common for shamans to hold positions as low ranking state officials, often serving as spirit mediums, fortune-tellers, healers, and exorcists. Shamanism continued to proliferate throughout China until the Sui dynasty, when Confucianism and Daoism began to take over religious thought and tradition. Daoists saw shamans as a threat since they were often employed to perform similar rituals and exorcisms. Eventually Shamanism declined drastically in the Song dynasty once Daoism became more influential in the Song China's courts. Daoist traditions and rituals gained influence and shamans were seen as false healers who exploited their clients for financial gain. Over time shaman healers, who were mainly illiterate, were replaced by doctors and medical experts who were trusted for their education and literacy.

Eventually, Shamanism was mostly isolated to cults in south-eastern and south-western parts of Ming China. During the Ming dynasty, Confucianism was at the center of China's philosophy and religion. Unlike their Daoist counterparts, the elite Confucian literati sought to end shamanistic practices through assimilation and suppression. This was important to Confucians because they saw shamans as a lower class and wanted to create a distinct separation from them.

This proved difficult because shamanism, unlike Daoism and Buddhism, had no central tradition, ideology, or location. Instead, isolated shaman cults were often established in small, local communities. In these isolated communities, shamans were accepted and continued practicing as exorcists, spirit mediums, and healers. Those who did hire shamans were often either ill-informed or could not afford a medical expert.

== Persecution of shamans ==
=== Shaman healers and Ming doctors ===
Under the rule of the Xuande emperor and the influence of the Ministry of Rites, Ming China began to crack down on shamanism and its practices. This was mainly due to the rise in the number of elite doctors and medical experts in Ming who saw the acceptance of Shaman healers as a threat to their jobs and society. During one epidemic in 1329, several neighboring communities that relied on shamanic rituals fell victim with most of their inhabitants dying while those who relied on doctors survived. Unlike Ming doctors, shaman healers whose practices ended up killing their patients would often be executed for their actions.

=== Shamans and Confucianism ===
Many officials saw the rituals performed by shamans as barbaric and undermining of Confucian thought and Chinese society. In western Hunan, a Shaman named Jiang Cong gained considerable power and influence throughout the region. His influence was strong enough that he could threaten local communities to pay tributes of food and wine or be cursed with bad luck. One ritual that he would perform involved the delayed burial of the deceased, a practice that was seen as sacrilegious in Confucian ideology. Eventually, Jiang Cong's influence caught the attention of state officials, who immediately ordered his execution.

In an attempt to co-opt shamanism into Ming culture, Ming military officials decided to rebuild a temple and rewrite scripture for a Canton cult dedicated to the Lady of the Golden Flower. This cult was dedicated to a deceased, unmarried female shaman who drowned. By praying to the spirit, pregnant women could be blessed with giving birth to a boy. However, when civil officials from the state discovered the shaman cult, they ordered the temple and scripture to be burned down.

In contrast, Shamans located in Hui'an in eastern Guangdong were assimilated into Ming society similar to Buddhists and Daoists. They were given roles as shefu, or temple managers, and only allowed to perform exorcisms and rain rituals. During seasons of poor harvest, officials would facilitate and attend rituals to pray to the gods.

== Common shaman practices ==
=== Spirit mediums ===
Shamans would often act as a spirit mediums by offering their bodies to be taken over by gods and spirits. This was accomplished by enticing them to enter their bodies through dancing, singing, and music. Spirits were invited into the shamans bodies as a form of communication to the deceased. The extent of each ritual was highly dependent on the shaman, some of whom would die in the process of the ritual.

=== Rain rituals ===
Rain rituals were one of the most common rituals performed by female shamans during times of drought or famine. If a female shaman was unavailable, then she would be replaced by a Buddhist or Daoist nun. Some of these rituals would often repeat the past rituals of the Shang dynasty of burning shamans alive as a sacrifice to the gods.

Another form of the rain ritual involved exposing one's body to the sun by lying on the ground wearing all white until it rained. In one instance emperor Zhu Yuanzhang exposed himself for three days until it rained.

Shamans also performed rain rituals when traveling on the ocean to quell storms. During the war against the Song dynasty, Zhu Yuanzhang's grandfather was a known as powerful shaman who used his powers to convince the rain deities to quell their storm at sea.

==== Confucian criticism of rain rituals ====
Ming officials often retold and celebrated Ximen Bao's attack on shamans during the Warring States period of China. As an official in the State of Wei, Bao convinced the citizens to stop the annual tradition of ritual sacrifice of drowning a young girl for rain by throwing the chief shaman and her followers into the river to drown.
