= Allahiyah Movement =

- حركة العلاهيّة
- Type: Banned
- Classification: Islam
- Region: Middle East (mainly Iraq)
- Founder: Abdul Ali Munim al-Hasani
- Origin: 2020
- Separated from: Sadrist Movement
- Members: 2,500
- Other name: Qurban Group

The Allahiyah Movement (Arabic: حركة العلاهيّة, romanized: Ḥarakat al-ʿAlāhīyah), also known as the Qurban Group (Arabic: جماعة القربان, romanized: Jamāʿat al-Qurbān, lit. 'Sacrifice Group'), is a banned Iraqi clandestine religious movement inspired by Shia Islam. The group reportedly deifies Ali, the cousin of Muhammad, and has been linked to veneration of Ali through lottery-based suicide rituals. The group was founded by Abdul-Ali Munim al-Hasani.

== History ==
The Allahiyah Movement was established by Abdul Ali Munim al-Hasani, a Shia cleric, also known as al-Mawla, in the city of Nasiriyah in Dhi Qar Governorate, Iraq, in 2020 before spreading around southern Iraq including Basra Governorate with no known central leadership. Throughout its history, the group has never officially announced a leader or leadership or its sources of funding though its widely believed to be through donations. It is believed that the group split from the Iraqi Sadrist Movement. The first appearance by the group was on August 26, 2020, where 25 young men in all black marched down the main streets of Suq Al-Shuyukh district, in Dhi Qar Governorate in southern Iraq proclaiming "Who said Ali is Allah. Ali, creator of a thousand divine entities" which is considered unusual for an ashura march. These chants were condemned by Shia clerics. Currently, the movement has 2,500 members across Iran, Iraq, Lebanon, and Syria. The movement has also expanded activities into Turkey though they have remained dormant with the suicide practices in Turkey. The movement doesn't have a singular place of worship nor do they have a headquarters, instead, they use mosques and homes of their members. The movement normally targets young men for recruitment into the movement and inciting suicide, with most of the movement's members being teens and young adults. The movement is accused of exploiting vulnerable situations among people, especially teenagers, to incite suicide. The movement also exploits minors who have had previous suicide attempts and/or drug addiction. According to Iraqi security reports in 2025, it was confirmed the movement received orders from Iran in Qom.

Because of their practices involving incitement to suicide, the Iraqi National Security Council has ordered several arrests on members and leaders of the movement citing safety concerns for the youth. By the time the Iraqi National Security Council launched their raids, they officially recorded 5 suicides done by the movement mostly carried out by young adults since the start of 2024 to the date of this statement.

In May 2023, 4 members of the movement were arrested in the Suq Al-Shuyukh district in Dhi Qar Governorate after 3 suicides due to their sentiments were reported in May of that year. One of the main connections to the arrests was after a member hung himself. Security forces did not go into details about the operation.

In June 2024, the Iraqi police arrested one of the movement's officials as he was in the eastern Hamza district heading to Karbala Governorate who admitted to inciting three members to commit suicide and murdering two members. He stated that he brought the three members to one place at different times for them to ritually commence suicide in front of him.

In July 2024, the Iraqi National Security Council announced the arrest of 54 members of the movement. In Basra Governorate, prominent leaders of the movement were arrested after raids and searches were done in multiple areas. Iraqi security forces on July 20 executed raids in 4 governorates of Iraq which led to the arrests of 39 members, this included a raid on a tent where suicide processions took place which also possessed images of those who committed suicide.

During the Iraqi authorities September 2024 raids of the movement, they arrested 47 members and preachers for the movement in Muthanna Governorate, Dhi Qar Governorate, Wasit Governorate, and Maysan Governorate. This included a prominent figure given the title of al-Arif, a member who's either a theorist or propagandist.

In December 2024, 35 members of the movement were arrested by security forces in Southern Iraq, mainly in Basra Governorate, after intelligence services received a tip of movement's operations.

In January 2025, the Iraqi authorities stated they'd intensify crack downs of members of the movement in Najaf after the committee to Fight the Forces of Darkness was established to fight what it called deviant new religious movements in Iraq.

On March 13, 2025, security forces in Iraq arrested three members, considered the most prominent leaders of the movement, in the Suq Al-Shuyukh district of the Dhi Qar Governorate.

On April 14, 2025, security forces across 5 governorates (Basra, Muthanna, Wasit, Maysan, and Dhi Qar) arrested 148 members of the movement including the al-Arif of the movement after raiding their hideouts.

In August 2025, a member of the movement was sentenced to life in prison after being found guilty of encouraging another member to commit suicide.

On September 13, 2025, three members of the movement were arrested, including a senior member, by Iraqi authorities in the southern Dhi Qar province.

On September 16, 2025, the leaders of the movement were arrested after investigations by the Iraqi intelligence services and Ministry of Interior after doing a sting operation against them.

On September 23, 2025, six members of the movement were arrested in the Al-Jubaish district, south of Dhi Qar Governorate, after warrants for their arrests were made in accordance with the provisions of Article 372 of the Iraqi Penal Code No. 111 of 1969. 5 of the 6 members all belonged to the same family.

On January 1, 2026, Iraqi Intelligence officers arrested a man in Suq Al-Shuyukh, Dhi Qar, after promoting the beliefs and ideologies of the Allahiyah Movement on social media and targeting minors to join the group. He was arrested with a warrant based on Article 372 of the Iraqi Penal Code No. 111 of 1969. He is considered one of the central members of the organization and after his arrest he was transferred to a security facility.

On January 8, 2026, a 22-year-old member of the movement was arrested by Iraqi Security Forces after spreading the beliefs and works of the movement in Suq al-Shoyouk, Dhi Qar district.

On January 17, 2026, Iraqi security forces raided the hide out of a 30-year-old movement member who used electronic means to garner more members and was arrested in Western Suq Al-Shuyukh, Dhi Qar, and was considered one of the central members to the organization.

On February 11, 2026, security forces affiliated with the Falcons Cell of Iraq arrested one of the three leaders of the movement in Dhi Qar after confirming the leader was responsible for several suicides with children. On March 18, 2026, the leader would be sentenced to life in prison after being found guilty for incitement, two members would also be convicted of murder for killing their friend in the west of Nasiriyah, and another member for the murder of a person near the ancient city of Ur.

On March 18, 2026, several members of the Allahiyah Movement and a prominent leader were sentenced to life in prison for inciting the suicide of children through suffocation, judicial rulings were issued against the four convicts based on the provisions of Articles 408 and 406 of the amended Iraqi Penal Code No. 111 of 1969.

On May 18, 2026, two leaders of the Allahiyah Movement were sentenced to six years in prison in Najaf for forcing others to commit suicide according to candle draws, to offer themselves as sacrifices by committing suicide by suffocation. The candle ritual is done by having every person present in a group session stand up and lighting a candle for each person and whosoever candle goes out first is the sacrifice.

On September 20, 2026, the Central Criminal Court of Iraq in Baghdad convicted two members of the group based on the provisions of Article 9 of the Law Banning the Ba'ath Party, Racist, Terrorist and Takfiri Entities, Parties and Activities No. 32 of 2016, and in accordance with Articles 47, 48 and 49 of the Penal Code. One of the convicts allegedly incited the other convict to commit suicide in accordance to the group's beliefs, with the inciter being sentenced to 6 years in prison and the other convict being sentenced to 1 year in prison.

=== Beliefs and practices ===
The Allahiyah Movement believes in the deification of Ali where a believer of Ali should give their life to Ali through human sacrifice, normally ritual suicide. They often perform shoors and tatbir while professing Ali as God according to video clips circulating on the internet. During these shoor and tatbir rituals, members of the movement will violently slap their faces and chests to the rhythm of latmiyas. Many of these beliefs are espoused by the movement's founder, Abdul Ali Munim al-Hasani (an Iraqi Shia cleric who fled to Iran), who tells his followers to reject mainstream Twelver Shia beliefs. A member of the movement told HuffPost Iraq "We believe that Imam Ali bin Abi Talib, peace be upon him, is God incarnate on Earth, and that sacrifices must be offered to him in order to gain his satisfaction and forgiveness" and denied that the movement carried out murders. What's considered to be the sacred place of the movement is the Imam Reza shrine in Mashhad where members normally walk to on foot in groups annually. According to monitors of the movement, their an extension of the Al-Maghaleen Group, and that they are not a movement born today, but rather a historical extension to the Kaysanites, Iftahis, Ismailis and Haruris.

Due to their practices, they're outlawed by the Iraqi court according to Article 7 of the Iraqi Constitution, which criminalizes the perpetrators of these ideas in the category of racism, terrorism, or takfir.

Many of these practices and beliefs are discouraged and considered forbidden by many Shia activists and clerics in Iraq and Iran, considering the movement ghulat, haram, and bid'ah. The cleric, Muqtada al-Sadr, urged authorities in Iran to extradite members of the movement to Iraq after accusing Iran of backing the group.

==== Suicide ====
The group normally picks contenders for suicide through a lottery based system with the names of its followers, and whoever's name appears in the lottery commits suicide in a Husseini procession. The reason for suicide as a method of ritual is because they believe that suicide brings a human soul closer to God and must commit suicide by the order of authority or lottery. The movement also believes that committing suicide for Ali brings judgement day closer. Before committing suicide, the member must possess a book from which they derive their religious teachings entitled "I Am I Am I" (which is only shared privately, mainly through electronic communications like Telegram) and must light candles and have flowers, then the member must do recitations. The group has become infamous in Iraq for this very practice, with them first gaining notoriety after several of its followers in Dhi Qar, including a 15-year-old boy, were reportedly found dead in a ritual suicide. The movement is linked to the increased amount of suicides in southern Iraq, with it doubling since the year before it was established.

In July 2023, a Lebanese-Canadian man who was visiting Lebanon threw himself off a building while naked in a suicide which was linked to the movement.

In August 2023, two members of the movement attempted suicide with one surviving and the other drowning themselves in the Euphrates river.

In August 2025, a man in his 30s was found to have hung himself in his home in central Nasiriyah where authorities linked the suicide to the movement.

In October 2025, a young adult in Kirkuk Governorate, Iraq, committed suicide after being influenced by the movement as it was found he was in social media channels involving them and had membership.

On August 28, 2026, a male in his 30s committed suicide in Nujaibiyah, Basra, which was connected to the Allahiyah Movement by security forces in Iraq.
