= List of Lakota deities =

Below is a list of commonly recognized figures who are part of Lakota mythology, a Native American tribe with current lands in North and South Dakota. The spiritual entities of Lakota mythology are categorized in several major categories, including major deities, wind spirits, personified concepts, and other beings.

== Gods ==
=== Major Spirits ===
- Aŋpo - The spirit of the dawn, an entity with two faces.
- Haŋwí - The moon Spirit who accompanies Wí. Also known as Haŋhépi Wí (Nighttime Wí) to differentiate her from Wí. The Spirit of motherhood, constancy, kinship, and feminine things.
- Íŋyaŋ - The primordial creator Spirit. His color is yellow.
- Kssa - The Spirit of knowledge and wisdom. He invented language, stories, names, games, and the first lodge, in which fire from Wí was placed at the center. One story about Iktomi mentions that Iktomi was Kssa, but was stripped of his title for his trouble-making ways. The Oglala Lakota believe that Iktomi was the second manifestation, or degeneration, of Ksa, who hatched from the cosmic egg laid by Wakíŋyaŋ. He is the enemy of Unk.
  - Iktómi - The trickster Spider Spirit and son of Inyan.
- Maka-akaŋ, or Maka - The earth Spirit created by Íŋyaŋ as his lover. Her color is green.
- Škaŋ - The motion of the universe. His color is blue.
- Untunktahe - The water Spirit.
- Wakȟáŋ Tȟáŋka - The Great Spirit/Great Spirits.
- Wakíŋyaŋ, or Waukheon - Thunder Spirits. Wakíŋyaŋ is believed to be a bird. The Thunderbird.
- Wóhpe, or Woohpe - The Spirit of peace and the wife of the south wind Okaga. Spirit of amity, beauty, compassion, and happiness. She moves among oppositions to create harmony.
- Wí - The solar spirit of bison. Also known as Aŋpétu Wi (Daytime Wí) to differentiate him from Haŋwí, who is also known as Wí. He is also the Spirit of bravery, constancy, endurance, fortitude, honesty, reliance, and contests. His color is red.
- Wičháȟpi hiŋȟpáya - Wičháȟpi or Star spirit, born of wičháȟpi owáŋžila (Resting star or Polaris) and Tapun Sa Win (Red Cheeked Woman).

=== Wind spirits ===
- Anúŋğite, or Ite - Wife of the wind Spirit Tate. The two-faced Spirit referred to as mother of the Four Winds, Yum the Whirlwind, and the daughter of the Pȟežúta (Medicine Men) Ka and Wa. She is also known as Wakanka, the elderly woman.
- Tate - The wind Spirit.
- Taku Skanskan - Capricious chaotic spirit who is master of the four winds and the four-night spirits, Raven, Vulture, Wolf, Fox.
- Wani, or Wanim - The four elder sons of Tate who oversee the cardinal directions, the four winds, health, the weather, and fertility. They can be combined into a single figure.
  - Okaga - Fertility spirit of the south winds.
  - Wiyohipeyata - The wind Spirit of the west who oversees endings and nighttime occurrences.
  - Wiyohiyanpa, or Yanpa - The wind Spirit of the east who oversees beginnings and daytime occurrences.
  - Yata - The north wind.
- Yum - A whirlwind Spirit, child of Anúŋğite. He is the Spirit of love.

=== Animal spirits ===
- Čapa - The Beaver Spirit of labour and taxes.
- Četáŋ - The hawk spirit of the East. Associated with the qualities of speed, dedication and good vision.
- Hehaka - The male Elk Spirit of sexuality.
- Hnaska - The Frog Spirit of Holy Medicine.
- Hogan - The purifying Fish Spirit of water.
- Hunomp, or Hununpa - The bipedal Bear Spirit of wisdom. He became the lower Spirit of wisdom after Iktomi forfeited his position as the Spirit of wisdom on being made the trickster.
- Iktomi - The Trickster, Spider Spirit of Deception and Lies. The son of Inyan.
- Keya - The Turtle Spirit of health, safety, and healing rituals.
- Mato - Mischievous healer Bear Spirit of passionate emotions.
- Mica - The Trickster Coyote Spirit.
- Sungmanito - The Wolf Spirit of hunting and war.
- Sunka - The Dog Spirit of companionship and faithfulness.
- Tȟatȟáŋka (Great Beast), or Ta Tanka - The male Buffalo Spirit of plenty. Enemy of Mica.
- Tatankan Gnaskiyan (Crazy Buffalo) - The malevolent spirit who wreaks havoc on love affairs, causing feuds, murders, and suicides.
- Wambli - The Eagle Spirit of councils, hunting skills, and battle.
- Zuzeca - The Snake Spirit of hidden things, concealed knowledge, and outright lies.

=== Personified Concepts ===
- Etu - The personification of time.
- Haŋ - The ancient spirit of darkness; banished to be under Maka.
- Unk (Contention) - Maka's companion who causes quarrels and is banished to the depths of the waters for her actions. She is Iya's and Gnaski's mother, nonetheless she is the progenitor of all evil things. She is the enemy of Ksa.
- Yuwipi - The healing ceremony.

=== Other beings ===
- Čanotila - Forest-dwelling beings.
- Gnaski - An evil spirit who manages to outwit and perfectly mimic Ksa to the point that he and Ksa were indistinguishable from each other, earning him the name "Ksapela", or "little wisdom". He is the child of Iya and Uŋk.
- Hihaŋkaǧa (Owl-Maker) - The aged Spirit who stands upon the entrance to the Milky Way, admitting the naǧí who show her the proper tattoos. Those who fail her test will be liberated from existence, where their memory and spirit will fade without honor.
- Iktinike - The son of the Sun Spirit Wí, who was banished to Earth for telling lies.
- Iya - The destructive storm monster of the north and brother to Iktómi. Also known as Ibom, the cyclone, and Wazíya (Blower From Snow Pines) - A Giant who guarded the entrance to the place of the Aurora Borealis. He fights against the south winds with his cold, icy breath. He also brings famine and diseases.
- Naǧí - A Spirit that has never had a mortal tether to this world, it is connected to all that the Creator has gifted in life (Like the Elements, Animals and Humans.) Some Naǧí "Feed" on the emotions of mankind and thus have the significant impact of either Benevolent or Malevolent natures based on the emotions that sustain them the easiest (Spirits that are "Evil" usually are attracted to humans with Anger, Wrath, Revenge, Sorrow or Sadness in their hearts and those that are "Good" attracted to Joy, Happiness, Love and Harmony.) Because they were not blessed by the Creator with a corporeal vessel, they have a difficult time showing themselves. This leads to some Spirits taking on the appearance of an anthropomorphic Animal, an Elemental figure, an incomplete Human or a monstrous Human figure.
- Pte Oyáte - The Buffalo people. They were created by Škaŋ to conduct the will of Wakȟáŋ Tȟáŋka.
- Uŋȟčéǧila - A Reptilian monster that wreaked havoc on the Plains and the Black Hills was slain by a warrior with medicine arrows.
- Unktehi - A race of spirits that resemble giant ruminants with long tails. Male unktehis live within water, while female unktehis live on land. They are often regarded as being dangerous or malevolent, as they contaminate water sources and cause floods. However, they can teach in the proper method of ceremonial body painting.
- Wakaŋpi - Spirits or divinities.
- Wamáǩȟanaǧi - Souls of animals, especially of domesticated types such as dogs or horses. They accompany their owners as they go to the Milky Way in the afterlife.
- Wanáǧi - Spirits of departed human beings. They ascend to the Milky Way to be judged by Hihankara, who tosses those without proper tattoos to be removed from existence. Living souls are known as wóniya.
- Wíčaŋ - Star people.
- Wónaǧi - Spiritual essence of food. Lakota's have to give due reverence and gratitude to their provisions, to ensure that the Wakaŋpi will not be upset.

== Notable people ==
- Fallen Star - A young warrior whose father was a star and whose mother was a human. He retrieved and returned the disembodied arm of a selfish chief (represented by the lower half of the constellation Orion), and was rewarded by marrying the chief's daughter.
- Heyoka - The contrarian who has visions of Waukheon.
- Ka - The first woman, who was banished to earth as a witch with her husband Wa for helping their daughter Anog Ite supplant Hanwi.
- Tokahe - The first man to emerge from the underworld.
- Wa - The first man, banished to earth as the wizard Wazi with his wife Ka for helping their daughter Anog Ite to supplant Hanwi. Like his wife, he helps whomever he chooses.
- White Buffalo Calf Woman - The prophetess who taught the Lakota to practice the Seven Sacred Rites.
