= Wocekiye =

Lakota-language term for prayer

Wocekiye (Lakota: Wočhékiye) is a Lakota language term meaning "to call on for aid," "to pray," and "to claim relationship with". It refers to a practice among Lakota and Dakota people engaged in both the traditional Lakota religion as well as forms of Christianity.

Central to the Lakota's spiritual practice is Wakȟáŋ Tȟáŋka, or the Great Mystery. Their primary cultural prophet is Ptesáŋwiŋ, White Buffalo Calf Woman, who came as an intermediary between Wakȟáŋ Tȟáŋka and humankind to teach them how to be good relatives by introducing the Seven Sacred Rites and the čhaŋnúŋpa (sacred pipe).

The traditional social system of the Sioux (Očhéthi Šakówiŋ) extended beyond human interaction into the supernatural realms. It is believed that Wakȟáŋ Tháŋka ("Great Spirit/Great Mystery") created the universe and embodies everything in the universe as one. The preeminent symbol of Sioux religion is the Čhaŋgléska Wakȟaŋ ("sacred hoop"), which visually represents the concept that everything in the universe is intertwined.

== Wakȟáŋ Tȟáŋka ==
The creation stories of the Očhéthi Šakówiŋ describe how the various spirits were formed from Wakȟáŋ Tháŋka. Black Elk describes the relationships with Wakȟáŋ Tháŋka as:

"We should understand well that all things are the works of the Great Spirit. We should know that He is within all things: the trees, the grasses, the rivers, the mountains, and all the four-legged animals, and the winged peoples; and even more important, we should understand that He is also above all these things and peoples. When we do understand all this deeply in our hearts, then we will fear, and love, and know the Great Spirit, and then we will be and act and live as He intends".

=== Beneficial spirits ===
There are sixteen Wakȟáŋpi of the Wakȟáŋ Tȟáŋka, which are arranged into groups of four and ranked according to their group.

Superior spirits:

- Wí — Sun
- Škaŋ — Motion, Sky
- Makhá — Earth
- Íŋyaŋ — Stone

Associate spirits:

- Haŋwí — Moon
- Tȟaté — Wind
- Wóȟpe — the Divine Feminine
- Wakíŋyaŋ — Thunder Beings

Subordinate spirits:

- Tȟatȟáŋka — Buffalo
- Hunuŋpa — Bear
- Tȟatúye Tópa — the Four Winds/Directions
- Yumní — the Whirlwind

Inferior spirits:

- Niyá — spirit (breathe)
- Naǧi — ghost (shadow)
- Naǧila — Spirit-like
- Šičúŋ — spiritual potency (intellect)

=== Malevolent spirits ===
The Wakȟáŋ Tȟáŋka Šíča are Malevolent (or indifferent) spirits, and follow in rough order of rank:

- Iya or Ibom - Second son of Inyan and an Unktehi. Lord of the Malevolent Gods. Stupid.
- Iktomi - First-born son of Inyan and Wakinyan. A fallen god, doomed to wander the earth as a spirit. The clever trickster.
- Unk - Goddess of passion. Maka's sister. Banished to the underwater world.
- Gnaski - A demon called the crazy buffalo. Daughter of Unk.
- Unktehi - Underwater monsters. The enemies of Wakinyan. Formed from the wrath of Unk when she was tossed into the sea.
- Unkhcegila - Monsters of the land. Formed from the wrath of Unk when she was tossed into the sea.
- Mni Watu - Water sprites.
- Can Oti - Forest dwelling elves.
- Ungla - Goblins who lurk in the night.
- Gica - cunning and malicious manikins who are visible or invisible.
- Waziya - The Old Man, or Wizard, who received his god-like nature from Iktomi, and is therefore doomed to a lonely immortal life on Earth.
- Wakanka - the Old Woman, the Witch, the wife of Waziya, doomed forever to a lonely immortal life on Earth.
- Anog Ite - Daughter of Waziya and Wakanka. The mother of the Four Winds, whose father was Tate. Also the mother of Yumni. Because she intrigued with Iktomi, she is doomed to a lonely immortal life on Earth.
- Wanagi - Rejected ghost spirits who fail the test of To Win, doomed to wander the earth.
- Hohnogica - Spirits of the home & hearth.

There are also a variety of other spirits in the world. They are indifferent to humans, but may cause harm, or be convinced to help humans.

- The Star People
- The Underworld Buffalo People
- Very Old People - have power which can be used for evil.
- Moon Women - When on their moon, women who are easily tricked or duped by Gnaski, Anog Ite and Iktomi.
- Tunkan (Tuh-kaw) - Spirits of the rocks. They are said to play a major role in the sweat lodge ceremonies.

== Types of medicine and holy people ==
- Wicasa Wakan - "Holy Men" who lead the regular public & private religious ceremonies and record tribal history. They keep track of the moons of the year and the related weather patterns & bird songs. Some make songs based on those of the various birds, from different times of the year, telling what kinds of things happen in the natural world during that time.
- Pejuta Wicasa - The Medicine Men. The healers & physicians, practitioners of herbal medicines as well as metaphysical healing ceremonies.
- Holy Dancers - Specific people charged with performing certain sacred dances for different reasons throughout the year. Their sacred regalia may be elaborate & considered holy, with no one but the intended dancer allowed to touch them.

== Common beliefs ==
- When one's pets die, their souls stay in this world and take care of one. When one dies, all ascend to the next world together.
- Those who practice medicine must never fall prey to the belief that the power originates from them, or they will lose the power to heal forever.
- "Thunder hears me" is a common expression, usually used in place of "I swear to God" when one is making a threat or promise. Essentially, "may the thunderbird strike me down if I am lying". The less intense version is "The earth hears me."
