= Lakota religion =

Traditional religion of Lakota people

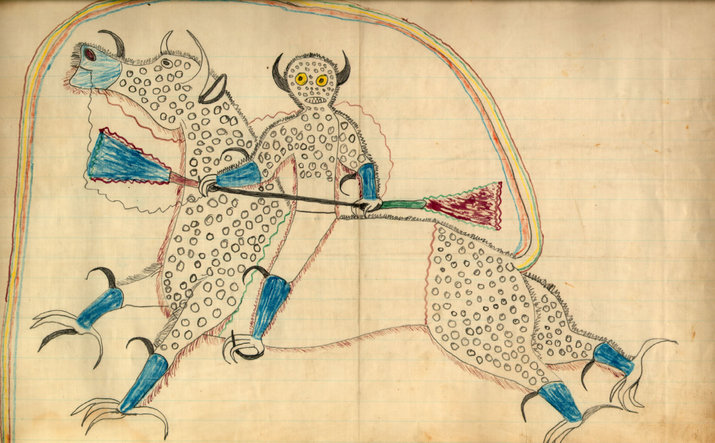
A Dream of a Wakíŋyaŋ, one of the sky spirits associated with thunder and lightning, by Lakota artist Black Hawk, ca. 1880

Lakota religion or Lakota spirituality is the traditional Native American religion of the Lakota people. It is practiced primarily in the North American Great Plains, within Lakota communities on reservations in North Dakota and South Dakota. The tradition has no formal leadership or organizational structure and displays much internal variation.

Central to Lakota religion is the concept of wakʽą, an energy or power permeating the universe. The unified totality of wakʽą is termed Wakʽą Tʽąką and is regarded as the source of all things. Lakota religionists believe that, due to their shared possession of wakʽą, humans exist in a state of kinship with all life forms, a relationship that informs adherents' behavior. The Lakota worldview includes various supernatural wakʽą beings, the wakʽąpi, who may be benevolent or malevolent towards humanity. Prayers are given to the wakʽąpi to secure their assistance, often facilitated through the smoking of a sacred pipe or the provision of offerings, usually cotton flags or tobacco. Various rituals are important to Lakota life, seven of them presented as having been given by a benevolent wakʽą spirit, White Buffalo Calf Woman. These include the sweat lodge purification ceremony, the vision quest, and the sun dance. A ritual specialist, usually called a wičháša wakhá ("holy man"), is responsible for healing and other tasks. The most common of these specialists is the yuwípi wičháša (yuwípi man), whose yuwípi ritual typically invokes spirits for healing.

One of the three main populations speaking a Sioux language, the Lakota had emerged as a distinct nation composed of seven groups by the 19th century. Many of their religious traditions reflected commonalities with those of other Sioux nations as well as non-Sioux communities like the Cheyenne. In the 1860s and 1870s, the United States government relocated most of the Lakota to the Great Sioux Reservation, where concerted efforts were made to convert them to Christianity. Most Lakota ultimately converted, although many also continued to practice certain Lakota traditions. The U.S. government also implemented measures to suppress traditional rites, for instance banning the sun dance in 1883, although traditional perspectives were documented in the 19th and early 20th centuries by practitioners like Black Elk. Encouraged by the American Indian Movement, the 1960s and 1970s saw revitalization efforts to revive Lakota traditional religion. In the late 20th century, Lakota practices increasingly influenced other Native American religions across North America.

Many Lakota practice their traditional religion alongside Christianity, typically Catholicism, Episcopalianism, or the peyote religion of the Native American Church. For these individuals, Wakʽą Tʽąką is often identified with the Christian God. Lakota traditions have also been adopted by many non-Native Americans, especially New Agers, a tendency condemned by some Lakota spokespeople as cultural appropriation.

== Definition and classification ==
Map of the Lakota's territorial distribution at the time of European contact

Their name deriving from a term meaning "allies", the Lakota comprise the seven westernmost groups of the Sioux peoples. Other terms for the Lakota include the Western Sioux, Teton Sioux, Tetons, Teton Dakotas, or the Thíthuwa (Prairie Dwellers). The Lakota had formed into seven subdivisions by the 19th century. The two southern groups are the Oglálas and the Sičháŋǧu, while the five northern groups are the Itázipčho, Húŋkpapȟa, Mnikȟówožu, Sihásapa, and Oóhenuŋpa, sometimes collectively termed the Saône.

Lakota religion has been described as an indigenous religion, and as a primal religion. There is no centralized authority in control of the religion, which is non-dogmatic, with no specific creeds. The tradition is transmitted orally, being open to individual interpretation, and displaying internal variation in its practice. Some practitioners have an attitude of religious pluralism and thus involve themselves in other religious traditions. This usually means types of Christianity, especially Catholicism or Episcopalianism, or sometimes the peyotism of the Native American Church. Other Lakota identify themselves strictly with just one religion, with this particularly the case for Christian fundamentalists. They may perceive some conflict between the two; some Lakota will remove any Christian imagery from a room if a traditional ceremony is to be performed there.

Native American religions have always adapted in response to environmental changes and interactions with other communities, including after encountering Christianity. This adaptation is evident in Lakota religion, with change being observed since textual records of it were first made during the 18th century. Much of this adaptation is the result of visions experienced by its practitioners, but also reflects influences absorbed, directly or indirectly, from neighboring Plains peoples as well as those from the Eastern Woodlands, Subarctic, and Great Basin. At the same time, tradition is a vital concept for Lakota communities, one that is regularly invoked to legitimate a link between contemporary practices and those of the past.

Among the Lakota, there are difficulties in drawing boundaries between religion and other areas of culture; as is the case with many Native American religious traditions, Lakota religion permeates all areas of life. In the Lakota language, there is no term cognate to the English word "religion", although Christian missionaries active among the Lakota have tried to devise one. Some Lakota prefer to refer to their religious traditions as a "way of life", while elsewhere some writers have referred to it as "Lakota spirituality." The latter reflects the fact that many Lakota, like certain other Native Americans, prefer to describe their traditional beliefs and practices as "spirituality", largely as a reaction against the Christian missionary use of the term "religion". The anthropologist David C. Posthumus suggested that the terms "religion" and "spirituality" could be used interchangeably when discussing Lakota traditions.

== Beliefs ==
=== Wakʽą and Wakʽą Tʽąką ===
A key concept in Lakota religion is wakʽą (wakan). This has been translated into English as "holy," "power," or "sacred." The anthropologist Raymond J. DeMallie described wakʽą as "the animating force of the universe," and "the creative universal force." Similarly, the scholar of religion Suzanne Crawford termed it an "invisible energy or life-force," while Posthumus described it as an "incomprehensible, mysterious, nonhuman instrumental power or energy". Many Lakota have stressed the incomprehensibility of wakʽą; the Oglála man Good Seat described wakʽą as "anything that was hard to understand." The term wakʽą also has connotations of being ancient and enduring. Ideas similar to the Lakota wakʽą are evident in the orenda of the Iroquois and the pokunt of the Shoshone.

Displaying a holistic view of the universe, Lakota religionists believe that wakʽą flows through the cosmos, animating all things, and that all beings thus share the same essence. It incorporates evil aspects of the universe, described as wakan šica ("evil sacred"). The universe is deemed to exist in a harmonious balance, although it is considered fundamentally incomprehensible and beyond humanity's ability to know it fully. In Lakota, objects or people who are imbued with wakʽą force can also be termed wakʽą. Practitioners of Lakota religion hold that humanity can share in wakʽą through ritual. Both wakʽą itself, and the rituals that pertain to it, are considered to be wókʽokipʽe (dangerous), with Stephen E. Feraca, a writer who worked at Pine Ridge Indian Reservation, relating that in Lakota religion, "fear and respect" were "virtually indistinguishable."

The unified totality of wakʽą is termed Wakʽą Tʽąką (Wakan Tanka), a term translated as "the Great Mysterious," "the Great Mystery," "the great holy," "great incomprehensibility," or "the sum of all things unknown". DeMallie described Wakʽą Tʽąką as "the sum of all that was considered mysterious, powerful, or sacred". Wakʽą Tʽąką is deemed to be eternal, both creating and constituting the universe. The term Wakʽą Tʽąką has been used as a Lakota translation for the English word "God", including by Christian missionaries, with some Lakota equating Wakʽą Tʽąką with the Christian deity. Although the scholar of religion Åke Hultkrantz suggested that Wakʽą Tʽąką could be regarded as "a personal, delimited Supreme Being", various other scholars have cautioned that Wakʽą Tʽąką was unlikely to have been seen as a personified divinity prior to the influence of Christianization.

=== Wakʽąpi ===
The wakʽąpi (wakampi) are beings made from wakʽą. In English, such entities are commonly called "the spirits". The anthropologist William K. Powers characterized these as "supernatural beings and powers," although Lakota belief draws no distinction between the natural and the supernatural, the latter being a European-derived category.

In Lakota belief, the wakʽąpi are immortal. Much of the information about them derives from Lakota mythology, with these spirits playing a role in creating and controlling the universe. They display a range of emotions, although their motives are often difficult to determine. Morally ambiguous in their approach to humanity, they can behave either benevolently or malevolently to humans. If offended by humans, the spirits can inflict misfortune, hardship, and even death. Their appearance is thought to sometimes be marked by white or blue flashing lights, but they can typically take any form and thus Lakota religionists believe they might encounter such entities in daily life without knowing it. The wakʽąpi are not worshipped by Lakota religionists, but the latter do try to placate and influence them. A key way of showing these spirits respect is by referring to them with the honorific terms tʻukášila or thukášila ("paternal grandfather") or ųcí (grandmother), terms which invoke a family relationship.

There is much variation in how Lakota religionists classify the wakʽąpi, as these classifications can derive from individual visions and experiences. One approach is to divide them into 16 categories, arranged hierarchically into groups of four: the Wakan akanta, the Wakan kolaya, the Wakan kuya, and the Wakanlapi. The former two groups are considered to be Wakan kin ("the sacred"); the latter two called Taku wakan ("sacred things"). The Wakan akatna or "superior wakan" comprise four primordial characters: the sun, Wi, the sky, Škan, the Earth, Maka, and the rock, Inyan. The Wakan kolaya, or "those whom the wakan call friends or associates", include the moon, Hąwí (Hanwi), the wind, Tʽaté (Tate), and the falling star, Wóĥpe (Woĥpe). The Wakan kuya are the "lower, or lesser, wakan", and include the buffalo, Tatanka, the two-legged (including both bears and humans), Hununpa, the four winds, Tatetob, and the whirlwind, Yumni. The Wakanlapi, "those similar to wakan", include niyá, nağí, and the šicų, the eternal inner components of a person.

Certain groups of spirits inhabit specific parts of the universe. The wakįyą (wakinyan, "flying ones"), sometimes called thunder birds, are spirits of thunder and lightning deemed to live in the west. Although generally benevolent and thought capable of ridding evil with their cleansing rains, they require propitiation to avoid their wrath. Other spirits include the ųktéĥipi (unkteĥi) water spirits, the unkcegila land spirits, the cʽąnáği (canoti) forest spirits, and the hoĥogica lodge spirits. These beings are potentially dangerous to humans and so are warded off through specific rituals and the aroma of sweetgrass and sage.

=== Cosmogony ===
A common origin story among the Lakota begins with Inyan (Rock). This Inyan opened up and the blue Mahpitayo (Sky) and green Maka Ina (Earth) bled from it, but were initially without motion. Inyan then opened again and released its spirit, taku skan skan, which imbued Mahpitayo and Maka Ina with life. Together, Mahpitayo and Maka Ina then created Taté (Wind), Wi (Sun), Hanhepi Wi (Moon) and the Pté Otayé (Buffalo Nation), who were the first people, as well as the ancestors of the Lakota. The first members of the Pté Otayé were Wazi (Old Man) and Wakanka (Old Woman), and they had a daughter, Ité, who then married Taté, giving birth to East Wind, West Wind, North Wind, South Wind, and Whirlwind.

The trickster, Iktomi (Spider) then convinced Anpetu Wito to fall in love with Ité, encouraging them to sit next to each other, breaking established decorum. To deal with the problem, Mahpitayo ordered Anpetu Wi and Hanhepi Wi to keep from each other, resulting in the sun and moon appearing at different times. Wazi, Wakanka, and Ité were banished to wander the earth, while the rest of the Pté Otayé remained in the spirit realm. Lonely on earth, Ité – who was now renamed Anog-Iné – conspired with Iktomi to lure other members of the Pté Otayé to join her. Seven couples from the Pté Otayé entered the earth in the midst of a harsh winter, where they were taught how to survive by Wazi and Wakanka. The seven couples established the seven sacred fires, or Oceti Šakowin, of the Pté Otayé.

The Pté Otayé on earth lived a harsh existence, and one winter were desperate for help. Two young men encountered a woman on the Plains, White Buffalo Calf Woman. One of them men lusted after her and sought to rape her; a mist arose and the man was reduced to bones. The other man treated her with respect, and she went on to teach his people how to use the sacred pipe, to perform seven ceremonies, and how to hunt buffalo. Lakota tradition holds that the White Buffalo Calf Woman will one day return to them from the east.

=== Spirit and afterlife ===
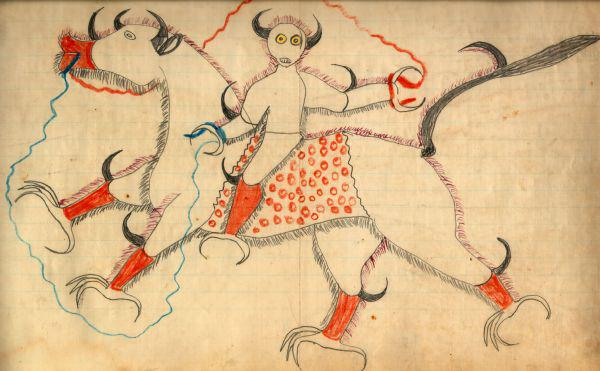
One of Black Hawk's artworks, depicting a vision he experienced of himself riding a buffalo eagle

Lakota religion draws a clear distinction between the physical body and a spiritual interior. It holds to a triune conception of the human spirit or soul, comprising the niyá, nağí, and the šicų. The niyá is the life or breath; the nağí is the spirit or soul; the šicų is the guardian spirit. These are the wakʽą aspects of a person and are therefore immortal. Also important to a person's identity is the wacʽį (mind, will, consciousness), the cʽąté (feelings, emotions), and the wówaš'ake (strength, power).

Lakota religion teaches that the niyá is given to a person at birth by the sky, Táku Škąšką ("Something that Moves"). The niyá is believed to live on after bodily death as an immaterial thing, likened to smoke or a shadow. The nağí retains a person's idiosyncrasies. The šicų is a non-human potency or influence, believed to have been given to a person by Táku Škąšką. It can separate from the body and travel while a person is asleep, while after bodily death it returns to the nonhuman person or star from which it originally came. Through visions and dreams, over the course of their life a human may acquire additional šicųpi.

Afterlife beliefs vary among the Lakota. The ghost of the deceased is termed a wanáği. Some Lakota believe that a person has multiple wanáği, one of which stays near to the deceased's body and their relatives, and the other which travels on the wanáği tʽacʽáku (ghost road) towards the wanáği tʽamákʽocʽe (ghost world). Others believe that there is only one wanáği, which remains near the corpse for a set time, often four days, before departing on the wanáği tʽacʽáku. According to one tradition, this road is bisected by a river that must be crossed on a log. By the crossing is an old woman who only permits the worthy to pass. The spirit world is presented as being made up of villages or camps and as being full of bison and other game. It is a realm without hunger or pain and the inhabitants feast and dance, thus producing the northern lights.

Another Lakota tradition is that a wanáği who fails to enter the ghost world will wander aimlessly, where it can sometimes be seen materialized in human form or heard whistling and moaning. This ghost may haunt a particular place, such as its former house or the tree in which it was buried. Ghosts bring problems for the living, causing sickness, anxiety, and death. Those who died unsatisfied are particularly prone to haunting the living; these may be appeased through ritual interventions. Ghosts are then driven away with incense or gunfire, or alternatively propitiated with offerings of tobacco or food.

=== Animism and kinship ===
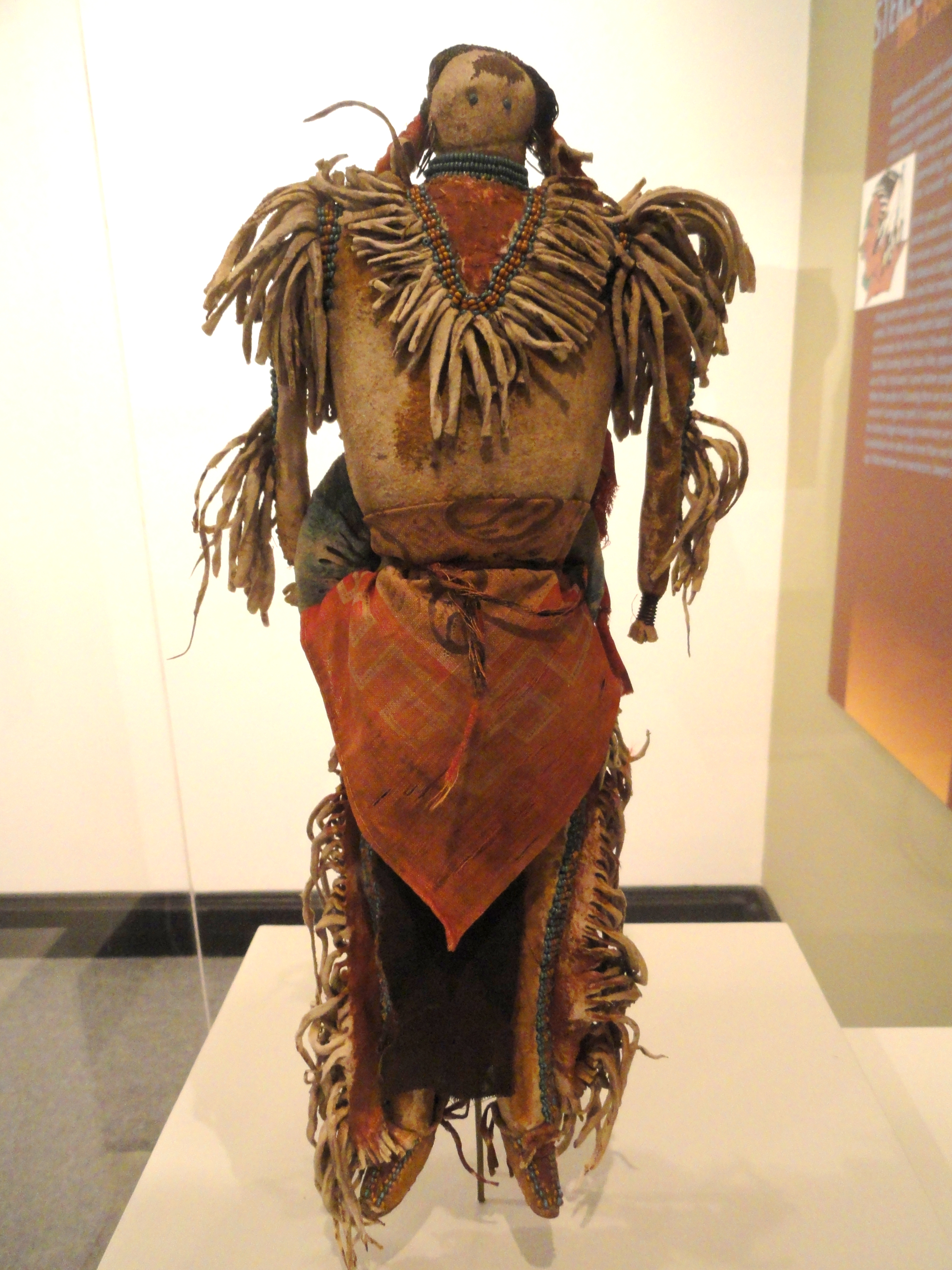
Lakota doll of a warrior figure, displayed at the Peabody Museum.

Lakota tradition holds that animals, spirits, rocks, trees, and medicine bundles are all persons with their own souls. Given the Lakota belief that "other species share an interiority or soul that is similar or identical to that of human beings", Posthumus argued that the religion was animistic.

Due to the unifying presence of wakʽą, in the Lakota worldview all life-forms as thought to be related, thus having reciprocal obligations and responsibilities to one another. Lakota religionists express this notion with the saying mitákuye oyás’į (Mitakuye Oyasin), meaning "all my relations" or "relatives all", something often repeated at ceremonial and social gatherings. Humans—who in Lakota are called Wicaša akantula ("men on top")—are deemed to be connected to all other living things through these bonds of kinship. Feraca described Lakota religion as "very strongly kinship oriented", while Posthumus suggested that kinship is "the dominant interpretative principle of Lakota culture".

Lakota religion does not present humans as being superior to other lifeforms. Instead, humans are perceived as the least knowledgeable and least powerful of beings, requiring the aid and pity of other entities. Lakota mythology holds that humans have learned much from other animal species. The buffalo play a central role in traditional Lakota cosmology. They are regarded as being relatives of the Lakota and a source of life, having historically provided the meat and hide that Lakota used for food, clothing, and shelter. Traditionally, the hunting and butchery of buffalo had ceremonial elements.

In Lakota belief, each species forms its own oyáte, a people, nation, or tribe. The oyáte categories are based on physical attributes, for instance the two-legged, the four-legged, the winged, those who swim, those who crawl, and those who burrow. There are further subdivisions within these categories. Each oyáte is regarded as having its own kinship rules, with its own warriors, hunters, holy men, and leaders. The Zįtkála Oyáte (Bird Nation), for example, is led by Wąblí Glešká (Spotted Eagle). Like human groups, the oyáte do not always interact peacefully with each other. There is for instance a war between Ųktéhpi (Horned Water Spirits) and the Wakíyąpi (Thunderbirds).

Due to the underlying shared interiority of all beings, Lakota lore holds to the possibility of physical metamorphosis. In Lakota myth, the Wakíyą can take the form of both birds and humans, while the Buffalo People similarly can take either buffalo or human form. Prominent mythological figures can also take different forms; White Buffalo Calf Woman for instance appears as both a buffalo cow and as a young woman. In various rituals, humans wearing something from another species, such as a wolf skin or eagle feather, are deemed capable of transforming into that animal.

==== Šicųpi and wašicu ====
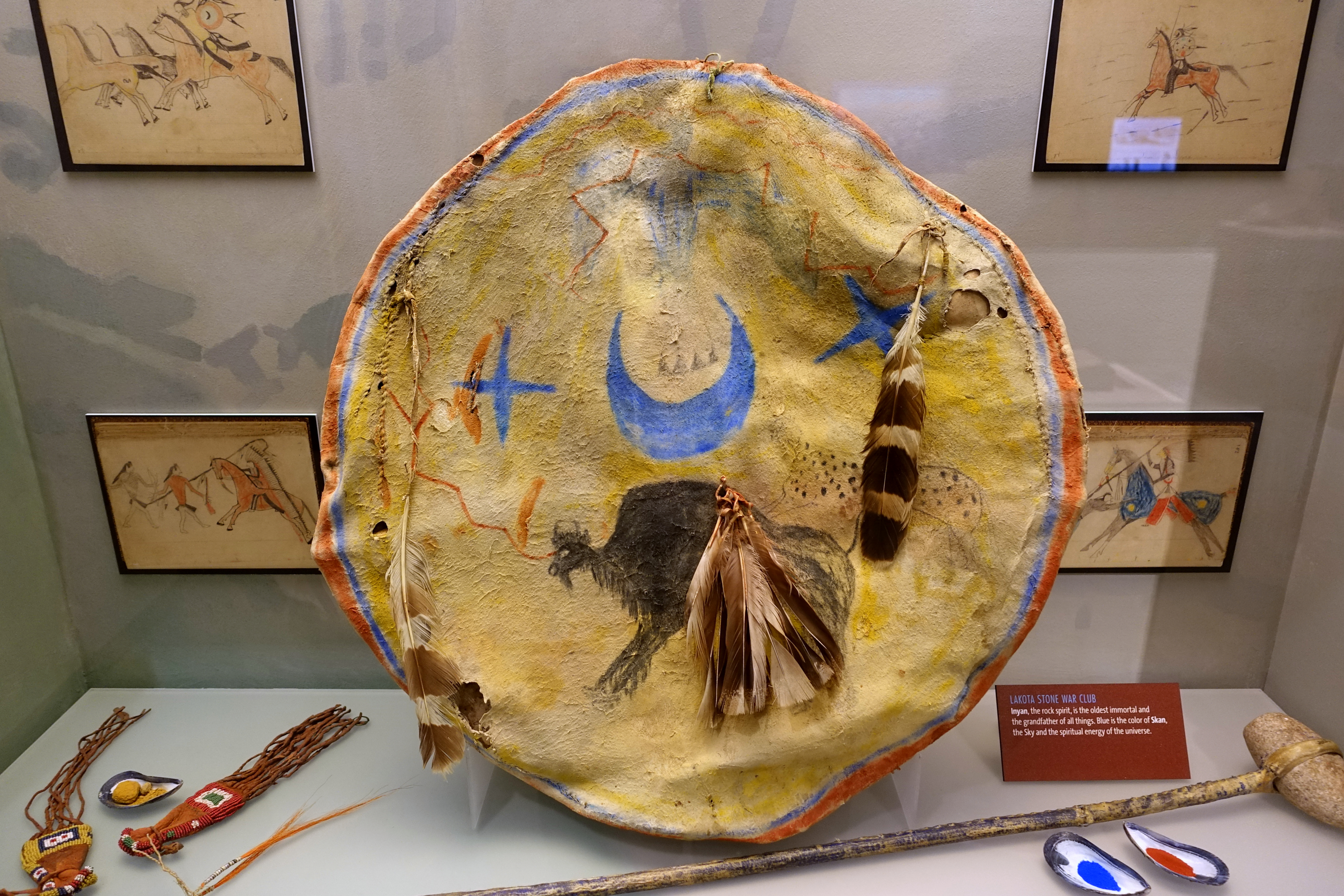
A Lakota shield on display in Harvard University's Peabody Museum of Archaeology and Ethnology.

In Lakota belief the šicų is deemed to be present in both animate and inanimate objects, as well as in supernatural beings and powers. At least one is embodied within the human body, having been given at birth by Táku Škąšką. Over the course of life, a person can acquire further šicųpi; in Lakota belief, this is how holy men increase their power, although they also lose them through their acts of healing. Those possessing such spirit helpers can become incredibly attached to them, regarding them as having become a part of themselves.

Also infused with šicųpi are the wašicu, also known as ceremonial bundles or medicine bundles. Among the Lakota, stories have been recorded claiming that the process of creating ceremonial bundles was taught either by Ųktéhi or Táku Škąšką; Posthumus suggested that the competing notions derived from different stages in Lakota history, the former story arising when they lived by the eastern lakes and the latter when they migrated to the Plains in the 17th and 18th centuries. Lakota traditionalists may place objects into a bundle that are based on images they have received in a vision. For practitioners, these bundles are "material manifestations of sacred power," regarded as life-forms or persons. If they are offended, they are thought to refuse to assist their keeper or even bring them harm. These bundles are a foci for ritual activity, each being associated with particular prayers, rituals, and songs. Historically, many Lakota men have also had a wótʻawe or war bundle, which may consist of weapons and herbal medicines to treat wounds.

Stones are also deemed capable of having their own niyá and being animate; Lakota lore teaches that they can move of their own accord, dance, communicate with humans, and produce sparks or blue light. Certain stones, usually small and spherical or egg-shaped ones, are believed to possess particular power. These stones are regarded as being inhabited by a šicų spirit that has its own personal name. The šicų is invited into the stone through a ritual called the cʻaštʻų, or the Inktomi Iowanpi (Spider Sing). These stones are often referred to as a thuká, an abbreviation of the term thukášila, or alternatively as íya wakhá (holy stones). Šicų-inhabited stones are deemed to protect their keeper, and contribute to the latter's power. They are worn if a person is engaged in an important task or is in need of assistance from spirit beings. The bundle in which these stones are usually kept is called the wašícų tʻųká. Although generally supposed to be kept in the bundle when not in use, this is not always adhered to – Feraca encountered a large example which was used as a doorstop.

=== Cosmology and the sacred hoop ===
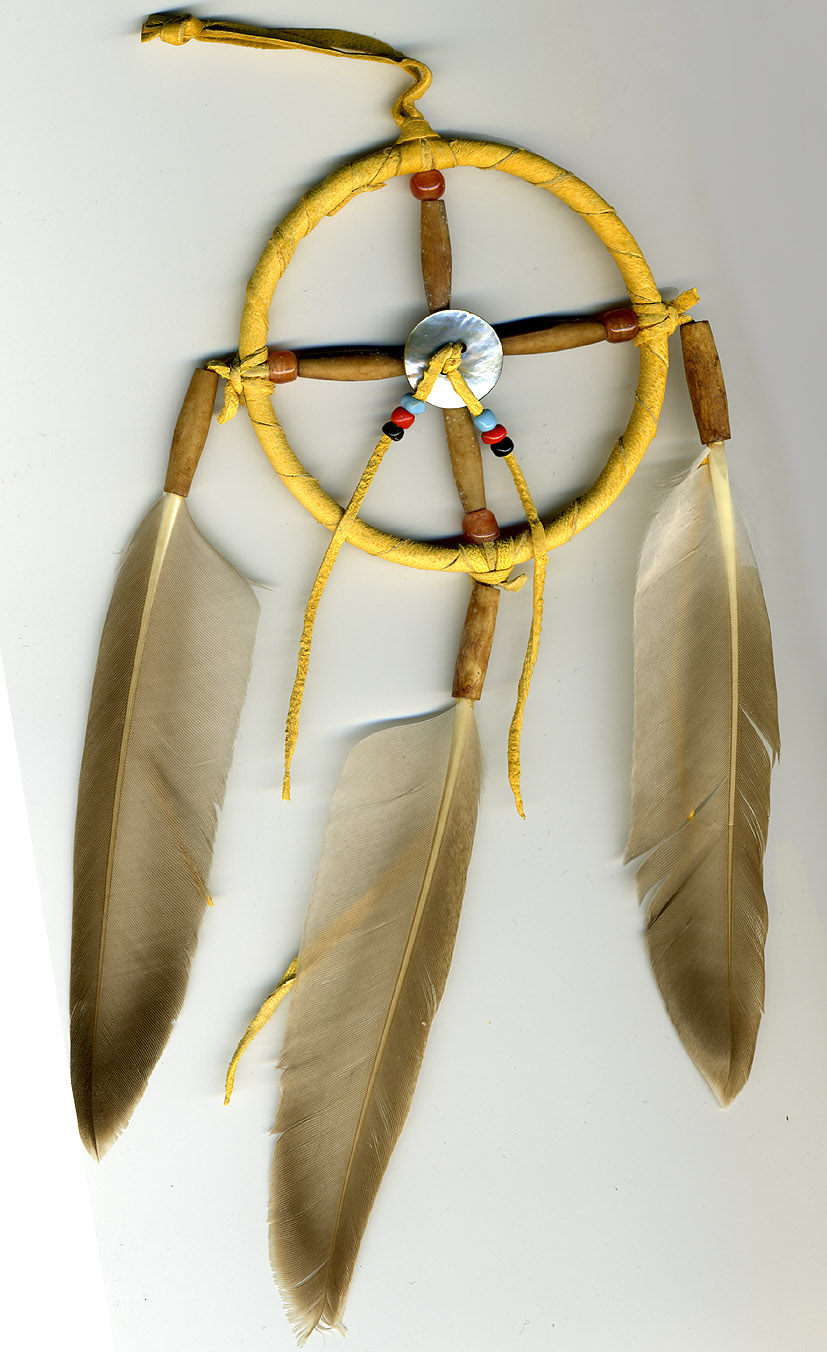
The Lakota "medicine wheel"

The anthropologist Luis Kemnitzer noted that, for Lakota, land offers a "religious-historical sense of place and continuity." Disrespect to the land is seen as an affront to Lakota spirituality. In the Lakota worldview, there are six directions, each with an associated color: west (black), north (red), east (yellow), south (white), the earth (green), and the sky (blue). The cross symbolism involving turning to the four directions is acted out in procedures such as the smoking of the pipe or the vison quest.

The sacred hoop, or cʽągléška wakʽą (cangleska wakan), is historically conceived as a camp circle formed by a ring of tipis. At some point, it came to symbolise the idea of all nations living in harmony, as well as the notion that all life is connected, including humanity's relationship with the buffalo and the wider universe.

=== Morality and gender roles ===
The anthropologist Beatrice Medicine referred to four main virtues among the Lakota: sharing and generosity, fortitude, wisdom, and bravery. The traditional goal of Lakota life was to life in harmony with wakʽą and to attain wicʽózani (health, wellness). The traditional Lakota concept of wolakota refers to living life in a manner that maintains a balanced relationship with other entities. Crawford noted that to "assure personal and communal health," it is important for Lakota traditionalists to honor their relatives, remain faithful to their bonds of kinship, and to affirm relationships with the cosmos and to wakʽą forces. It has been argued that the Lakota traditional belief that all things are kin has contributed to a conservationist ethos among 21st century Lakota.

Lakota culture features a notion of imminent justice or retribution termed wakhúza, with Lakota religionists believing that a person's bad conduct will bring repercussions both for them as an individual and for their relatives, sometimes impacting multiple generations. This will be imposed by the spirits, although it is ultimately caused by a person's own actions themselves. The torture or needless killing of animals is also regarded as a moral transgression. Feraca described the traditional Lakota worldview as being fatalistic.

Traditional Lakota society clearly defines and separates the roles for men and women, with Medicine referring to the "complementarity of the sex roles in Lakota life". In Lakota religion, the quest for knowledge of wakʽą has been a largely male concern. Sex could be detrimental to a man's power and thus men were expected to refrain from it before hunting or going to war. While menstruating, women are prohibited from certain rituals like the yuwipi, with tradition maintaining that their blood would offend the spirits. During menstruation, women were historically expected to retreat to the išnatipi ("to live alone"), away from other community members. Historically, the winkte ("would-be woman") were males who experienced dreams of a wakan woman or the pte winkte hermaphroditic buffalo cow, and thus adopted the social role of women, sometimes marrying men. The winkte were responsible for naming children.

== Practices ==
Both public and private rituals permeate traditional Lakota life, with such rites typically being practical and goal-oriented in intent. They are designed to achieve and maintain a state of wolakota, meaning balance or harmony. While some Lakota have emphasized the importance of correct procedure, others believe a practitioner's intention is the most important part of a rite. Some scholars have described Lakota traditional ceremonies as culturally conservative. DeMallie argued that ritual is more standardized than belief in Lakota religion and that the incorrect performance of a rite according to custom can be seen as invalidating it and potentially causing harm. Conversely, Feraca observed a "lack of rigid standardization in Lakota ceremonialism."

The right to lead a ceremony is typically deemed to derive from oral transmission from elders, from personal visions, or from an act of self-sacrifice such as fasting. Lakota will often believe that the authenticity of the rite derives from its following of protocol as well as the ethnicity of the person leading it; Lakota practitioners disagree on the extent to which non-Native Americans can participate in such rites. Since the mid-20th century there have also been debates regarding which ritual roles women should be permitted to hold. Generally, menstruating women are asked not to attend ritual. Participants will usually remove shoes for ceremonies, as a sign of humility.

According to a tradition recorded by Black Elk, seven rites were taught to the Lakota by White Buffalo Woman: the wanagi’yu hapi funerary rite, the isnati ca lowan rite of passage for girls, the tapa wankayeyapi ball game, the inipi sweat lodge, the hanble’ceya vision quest, the hunkapi adoption ceremony, and the wi’wanyang wacipi sun dance.

=== Prayer and offerings ===
Through ceremony, the [Lakota] sought to (re)establish relationship and to placate, and appease ambiguous, powerful, and often frightening and dangerous spirits. Generally, they wanted to be left alone, free of anxiety, misfortune, sickness, and death. Honoring, respect, and reverence[...] are more appropriate from [Lakota] perspectives than worship.

— Anthropologist David C. Posthumus

The Lakota term wacʽékiye (wacekiye) denotes prayer, but also means to call on someone's aid or to claim a relationship with them. In Lakota religion, prayer thus entails invoking a relationship with wakʽą beings, encouraging them to live up to the generosity expected of them as kin. Also part of wacʽékiye is the need to appear pitiful before the spirits, with Lakota prayers commonly featuring the expressions "pity me" and "pity us". For Lakota, prayer is also about placating the spirits and showing them respect. It usually entails a ceremonial crying or wailing, followed by lifting the arms up with palms outstretched and then putting them towards the ground in a sign of respect and gratitude.

A sacred space for communicating with the spirits is termed hócʽoka (hocoka). These are not permanent spaces and ceremonial rules only apply for the duration of the ritual; DeMallie noted that no "sharp distinction" is made between the sacred and the profane in Lakota tradition. Bison skulls are often used as temporary altars, as are rocks or boulders typically painted with red earth. Offerings to the spirits may also be tied to trees, left at the base of a tree, or placed on hillsides. These places become means through which to communicate with wakʽą.

Cloth flags erected as offerings are called a wa’úyapi (wanunyanpi; "offerings"). These became prominent at a time when cloth was a highly esteemed item among Lakota communities. The flags appear in different colors, each representing a cardinal direction: black (west), red (north), yellow (east), and white (south). For certain rituals, like the yuwípis, two additional flags may be used: green (earth) and blue (sky). Small bits of tobacco are often tied in one corner of the cloth. The Čhalí wapháĥta ("tied tobacco pouches") consist of small squares of cloth that contain a few grains of tobacco. The spirits are believed to take the essence of the tobacco back to their homes. Sage is often employed in Lakota ceremonies; it is deemed sacred to wakʽą beings, with the spirits enjoying its aroma. As well as being used in prayer, it is burned for purification and tied into bundles given as offerings. Those picking leaves will often request permission from the plant before doing so.

==== Suffering and sacrifice ====
Suffering is an important element of Lakota religion. The sincere suffering of an individual during ritual is believed to attract the spirits' attention while also mediating the broader suffering of the community. As most people are deemed to have nothing to offer to the wakʽą forces but their own bodies, the sacrifice of a person's own flesh is deemed appropriate. In some ceremonies, participants cut small pieces of flesh out of their arms or legs, which are then offered to the spirits, especially if the supplicant wishes to get the spirits' aid in healing a sick person.

Dog sacrifice is also practiced in Lakota religion, an act generally seen as repugnant by many other Native American groups and European Americans. One explanation given for this act is that the dog's spirit will receive a vision, which it can then relay back to a ritual specialist. The sacrifice usually entails a puppy being selected, sometimes painted, and then strangled to death with a rope, after which its flesh will be prepared as the main dish of a religious feast. Once the dog meat is boiling in a pot, a ceremony called the Heyoka kaga is performed. This entails people dancing around the pot while singing songs to the heyoka spirits, plunging their hand into the boiling water intermittently. They then use forked sticks to try and remove the meat, which is subsequently shared and eaten. Other dishes traditionally eaten at Lakota feasts include the wahanpi buffalo or beef stew, a chokeberry dish called wojapi, and frybread. At feasts, a plate is often set aside and either buried, burned, or placed in a secluded place, intended to be eaten by ghosts.

=== The sacred pipe ===
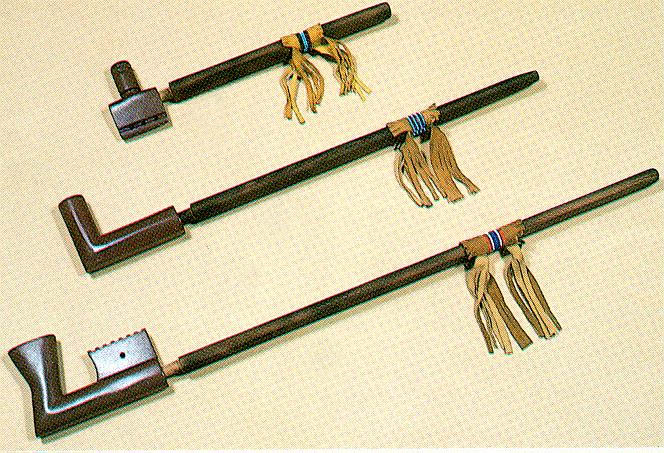
Pipes hold a sacred role in Lakota religion

An important sacred object for the Lakota is the cʽąnųpa wakʽą (chanupa wakan) or sacred pipe. It usually consists of a hollow wooden stem attached to a catlinite bowl. Catlinite is quarried from near Pipestone, Minnesota; the Lakota term this iyanša (red stone), for in their mythology it formed from the blood of a people killed in a primordial flood. Additional material, such as eagle feathers, may be attached to the pipe.

Smoking the pipe is a means of prayer; the Lakota word for pipe smoking and for prayer are both wacʽékiye. The substance smoked, kinnikinnick, is a blend of various herbs, but primarily cancasa, the inner bark of red ossier dogwood. Practitioners believe that smoking renders their prayers more powerful and effective, for the smoke takes the prayers directly to Wakʽą Tʽąką. The smell is deemed pleasing to benevolent spirits and off-putting to malevolent ones.

Pipe smoking ceremonies were historically found among various Plains peoples. Among the Lakota, it is integral to most major rituals, although is not regarded as one of the seven rites given by White Buffalo Woman. In Lakota pipe smoking ceremonies, the pipe will be unwrapped, assembled, and then held aloft to each of the four directions while prayers are offered. It may also be passed around all assembled persons, so that each may pray in turn. Those menstruating are barred from smoking. When not in use, the pipe will be disassembled into its bowl and stem so as to limit its power and potential danger arising from that.

Any Lakota may possess a pipe, but there are certain examples, owned by particular families, that are well-known and highly regarded. The most important for the Lakota is the Buffalo Calf Pipe or Ptehícala Čhanúpa. This is the community's "most sacred possession," described as "the very soul of their religious life". In Lakota tradition, the Calf Pipe was given to the Lakota by White Buffalo Woman. Many Lakota attribute much of their community's traditional religion to the acquisition of this pipe, sometimes believing that all other pipes originate from it, or derive their power from it. The Buffalo Calf Pipe is kept within a sacred bundle and entrusted to a keeper within the community. The scholar of religion Suzanne Owen called the Pipe's keeper "one of the most important roles among the Lakota". For several generations the Pipe has been in the custody of the same family, residing at Green Grass Village on the Cheyenne River Reservation in South Dakota. Before the keeper dies, they will pass the task on to a blood relative, a decision they are guided to make through visions. The Sacred Calf Bundle will be opened for ceremonies on special occasions.

=== Sweat lodge ===
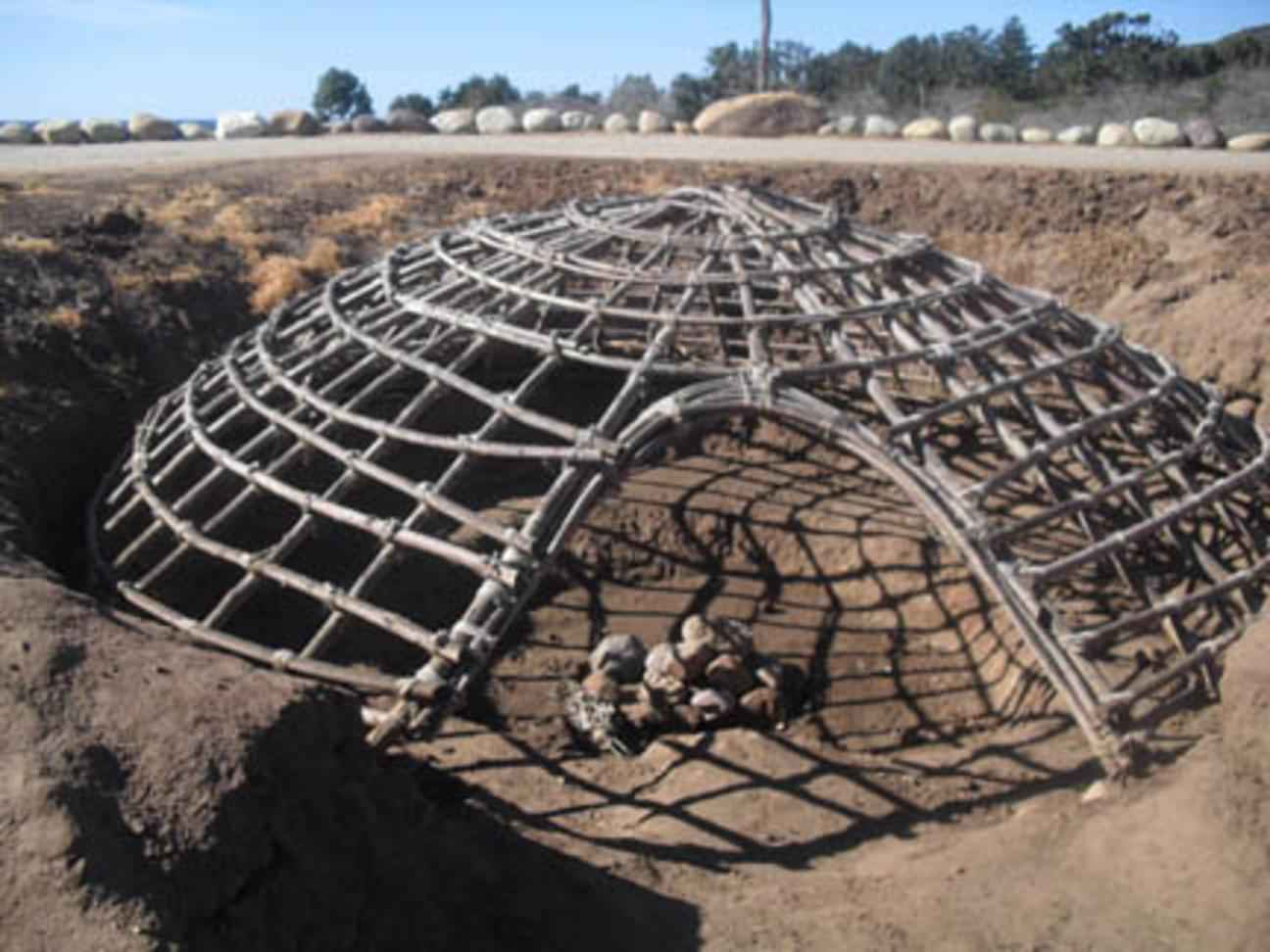
A sweat lodge structure like that used for Lakota ini kaġapi rites

A basic preparation before Lakota rituals is the ini kaġapi ("they revitalize themselves"), a period of time spent in a purification lodge or sweat lodge. A shorter variant of this process is often termed the inípi. This is deemed a time for prayer. Although intended to cleanse or purify a person's body and spirit in readiness for a ritual, it can also be carried out for its own sake, rather than as a preparation for another rite.

The sweat lodge itself is called the iníthi. This is the only permanent religious structure used in Lakota religion, and is often situated close to a practitioner's home. The iníthi is typically made from willows bent into a framework, usually around six feet in diameter and four feet in height. The entrance may face either the east or west. The structure typically resembles a round dome. Participants may tie offerings of cloth or tobacco to the willow framework. When in use, a canvas will be draped over the outer frame. Close to the iníthi will often be found an earthen mound representing the Earth, or an altar featuring staffs to which offerings may be tied.

While there is a general framework behind the sweat lodge ritual, each performance will be unique. A fire will be lit outside the lodge; ceremonies sometimes accompany the gathering of firewood and the lighting of this fire. Once the participants have entered the iníthi, one person may stay outside, the thiyópa awáyąke (doorkeeper). Stones heated on the fire are then placed in a pit at the centre of the lodge. Water is poured onto these stones, producing steam. Cedar may also be sprinkled onto them to create an aroma. The interior becomes extremely hot; the endurance is seen as a means of suffering to secure prayers to aid others. The interior of the lodge is largely dark; sparks seen on the rocks, or sounds heard, are often considered spirit manifestations. Those who meet inside the sweat lodge are typically naked. Participants will offer prayers and songs, also rubbing and slapping themselves with sage. A pipe may be smoked, in which case it will be passed clockwise so that everyone can smoke in turn. Once the ceremony is over, the participants leave the lodge and dress, sometimes sharing another smoke and a meal.

=== Vision quest ===
In Lakota, a vision quest is called a hąblécʽeyapi (habléčheya; "crying for a dream/vision"). According to Feraca, this is "one of the core elements of Lakota religion." In Lakota, the term hąblé applies to a dream or vision, although in traditional culture a distinction is usually made between an unsought dream and a vision pursued through a hąblécʽeyapi. In Lakota culture it is thought that anyone, regardless of gender, may undertake the hąblécʽeyapi to gain advice from the wakʽą beings. While both men and women now undertake the quest, there are debates as to whether that was the case historically; 19th century records only describe male experiences with vision questing.

Prior to a hąblécʽeyapi, an individual may undergo purification in the sweat lodge, sometimes with an older mentor. They will then depart to an isolated place, usually upon a hill, to spend time alone in the hope of receiving a vision. During this period, the seeker will be largely naked and have their hair un-braided as a sign of humility to the spirits. This is to ensure that they are pitiable to the spirits and the latter will hear the supplicant's prayers. They will fast, although a small quantity of water may be permitted them if staying for multiple days. Often, they will stand and sleep on a bed of sage; they may also have, and smoke, a filled pipe for prayer. Offerings of cloth flags and tobacco may be tied to poles positioned in the four directions, marking the space as wakʽą. A buffalo skull altar may be placed in the west corner. The vision seeker may remain there for as long as four days and nights. A mentor may visit them daily, although passers by are expected to ignore them.

The content of the vision is often unique, however there are also recurring motifs among Lakota visions, such as the presence of a tipi in the clouds. Receiving a vision gives the vision seeker a wakʽą quality that sets them apart from other people. It provides the vision seeker with knowledge and often powers to heal the sick, which they will then be obliged to use to help people. After the vision, the seeker may return to their community and undergo another sweat lodge ceremony, during which they may discuss their vision with their mentor. They may also conduct a káğa, a ritual re-enactment of their vision. Some of those taking part in the hąblécʽeyapi give up without receiving a vision. Those who fail are often accused of breaking their fast or of being morally unfit to receive a vision.

=== Sun dance ===
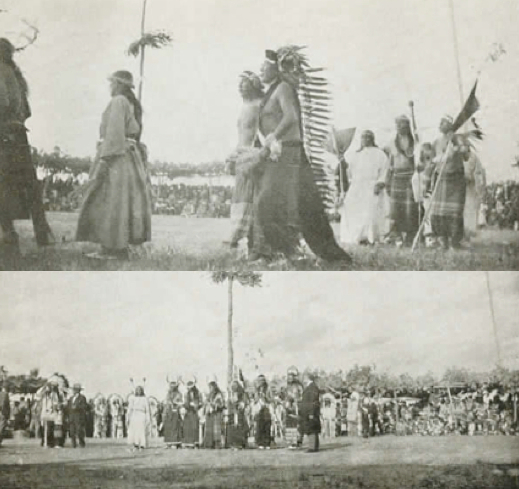
Photographs of the sun dance performed on the Rosebud Reservation in 1928

The Lakota sun dance is termed the Wiwáyag Wačípi ("sun gazing dance" or "gazing at the sun"). It derives from the Cheyenne medicine lodge ceremony; the Cheyenne called these ceremonies "sun dances", although unlike the Lakota version these did not entail dancers staring at the sun. It is unclear when the Lakota developed their sun dance, although Hultkrantz argued that the rite spread through the Plains no earlier than the 18th century. It was present among the Lakota by the 19th century, when it was "essentially a warrior ceremony," performed to secure success in battle or to capture horses, or to fulfil a vow in thanks for a previous success. The Oglalás were then instrumental in diffusing the sun dance among other Plains groups.

The sun dance typically takes place in June or July, during the summer months. The modern sun dance is organized by a committee who select the date, pick a director, and arrange for publicity and the maintenance of the grounds east of Pine Ridge Village, where the ceremony takes place. The dance itself takes place in a purpose-built dance lodge, consisting of two concentric circles of posts. Between the inner and outer rings, pine boughs or plywood forms a protective roof to create areas of shade where the spectators sit. The inner circle is left open to direct sunlight. In the inner circle, a central pole, the čhawákha ("holy tree"), is erected. This is made from a wáğačha, or cottonwood tree, which is stripped of its branches except at the top. Specific customs are observed while cutting this tree, with the first cuts being made by virgin girls; the pole is not supposed to touch the ground until being erected in the dance lodge.

After being erected, the čhawákha is honored with songs, smoke from a sacred pipe, and prayers to the four directions. While the decoration on the čhawákha varies, it typically features a red cloth banner and a brush bundle tied near the top, the latter representing a nest of the thunderbirds, as well as being an offering to secure the supply of wild plant foods. Also commonly added to the čhawákha are rawhide images of a human or buffalo figure, cloth streamers, and tobacco bundles. Soil from the hole where the čhawákha was set-up may be collected to form an altar, on which a buffalo skull is sometimes placed. Near to the dance lodge, a sweat lodge and tipi will also be erected in advance of the ceremony.

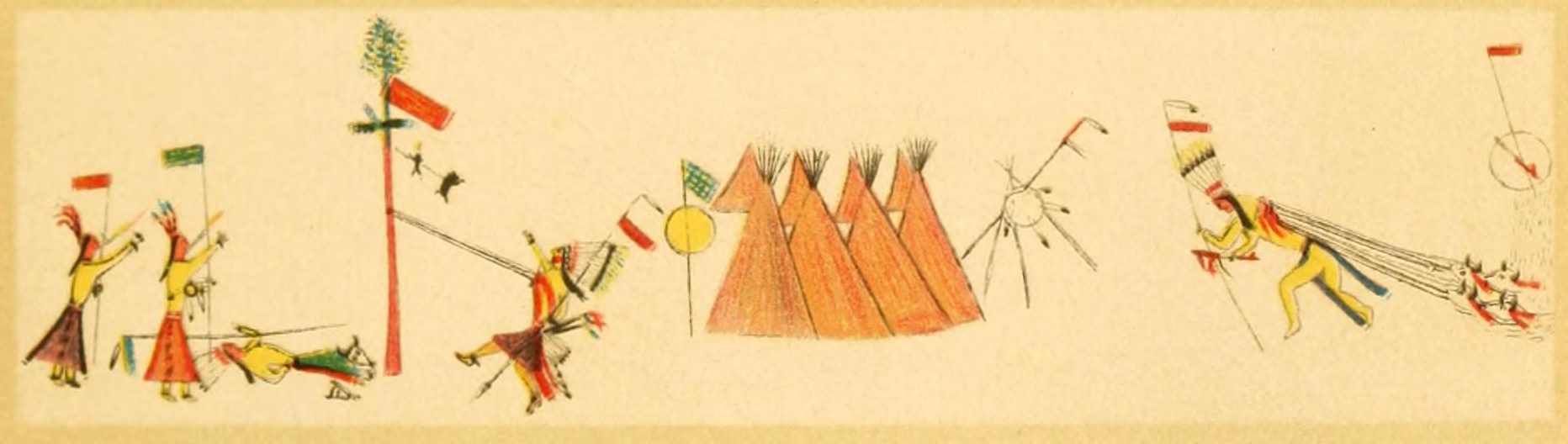
A drawing of a Lakota sun dance from 1918

The sun dance has always seen variation, and no two sun dance ceremonies are identical. On the night before the dance, a feast will often be held, while some people will stay up around a fire all night, drumming and singing. The dancers will sleep in the tipis, where the floors will be covered in sage. The dancers form part of a procession who come from the tipi to the centre of the dance lodge, carrying a buffalo skull. They circle the čhawákha clockwise, before placing the skull on the west side of the lodge. Prayers will often be said, and the dancers then face toward the sun. They may face the sun, or alternatively the four directions, or the čhawákha. The dancers will often bob by their knees while remaining standing in one location, although will sometimes dance around the pole. Throughout, the dancers are expected to pray, blowing repeatedly on eagle ulnar whistles. A group of singers will perform accompanied by drumming.

The sun dance is intended to facilitate communal renewal through the sacrifice of the dancers. Many dancers physically pierce their skin during the ceremony, although the manner in which this occurred varies. Sometimes, cuts are instead made on the dancers' limbs. Other instances involved thongs being affixed to the dancers back or chest muscles, often on sticks skewered through their flesh. These thongs were then attached to a rope that would be attached to the čhawákha. Often, the piercings will tear free from the dancer's body during the dance. Some of those who dance for several days choose to only pierce during one of them, although others remain pierced for each day. On occasion, the rope will instead be attached to a group of buffalo skulls which will then be dragged around the circle by a dancer. Some of the spectators, including women and the elderly, sometimes also provide flesh offerings during the ceremony. After the sun dance ends, the čhawákha and encircling lodge will often be left in place to decay.

=== Further rites ===
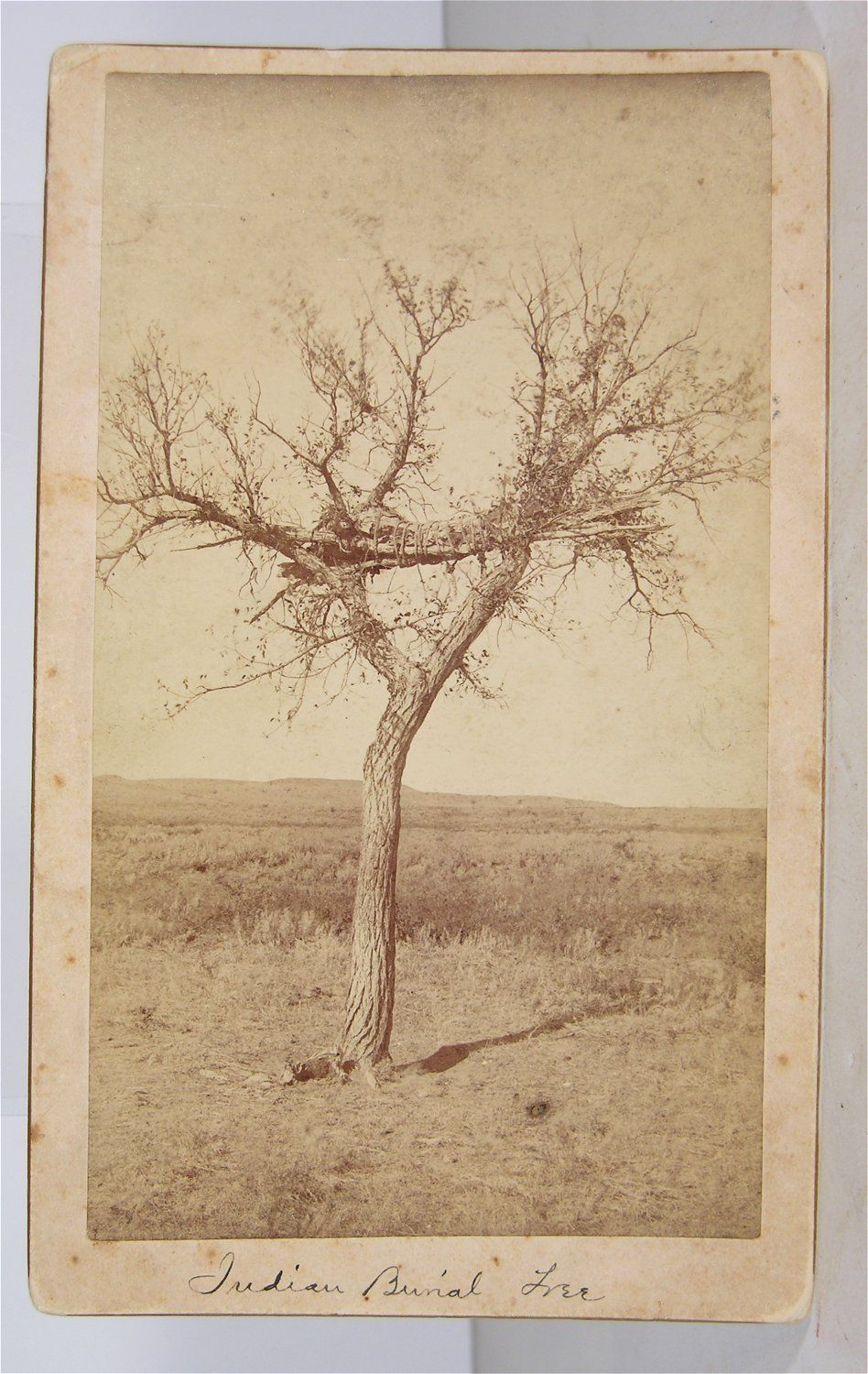
A Lakota burial tree photographed circa 1890

The Lakota Puberty Ball Ceremony Isnati Awicalowan is a coming of age ritual for young women. When a girl first menstruates, she is placed in seclusion for four days, during which older women will teach her women's tasks, including cooking, basketry, weaving and beading. A sponsor, who is often the girl's grandmother, will symbolically take on the role of White Buffalo Calf Woman during this ritual. Once the rite is over, the girl is considered to have become a woman. Her family then hold a feast and give gifts to others. Medicine suggested that the hąblécʽeyapi ceremony offered a comparable coming of age rite for males.

Traditionally, the Lakota placed their corpses in trees or on purpose-built scaffolds. Some families chose to retain the spirit of the deceased person for a set time, doing so through a ceremony called the Wanagi Yuhapi. A lock of hair is taken from the deceased and kept for a year, cared for as it is considered to hold the person's spirit. During that year, the family must observe specific etiquette. At the end of the year, mourning songs and prayers are offered and the hair is burned, allowing the deceased's spirit to proceed to the afterlife. The family will then hold a feast and give gifts. Objects belonging to the deceased may be given away to prevent their soul continuing to lurk around their possessions.

The Hunkapi lowanpi (Hunka ritual) is an adoption ceremony in which new kinship relations are established with somebody, sometimes allowing the integration of non-Lakota people into Lakota families. Historically it has played an important role in keeping peace between communities. According to Black Elk, the first Hunkapi lowanpi was held between the Lakota and the Arikara, having been given to the Lakota holy man Matohoshila (Bear Boy) in a vision. These rites will often be overseen by a holy man and conducted in a special tipi with an earth altar set up inside it. In some versions of this ceremony, songs are sung over the individual being adopted and a pipe stem is waved over them. The limbs of the being establishing a kinship connection will be tied together and their respective families will exchange gifts. The adopted person will be given a new name, and they are then given dried meat and cherry juice to consume.

=== Healing and cursing ===
Healing is an important part of traditional Lakota religion. Accounts from the early 20th century suggest that Lakota typically attributed all sickness to a supernatural causation, whether that be punishment from spirits or the curses of sorcerers. By at least the latter half of the 20th century, a common belief among Lakota people was that their ancestors experienced no serious ailments prior to the move onto the reservations. Traditional healing practices are often the most popular alternative to Western medicine among Lakota. Many modern Lakota favor traditional medicines; they may regard them as being more powerful, mistrust European American doctors, or fear being hospitalized away from their family. In the early 21st century it is nevertheless common for Lakota people to employ modern Western medicines alongside traditional healing methods or those of the Native American Church.

Anyone with knowledge of traditional healing methods is termed a wupiye ("one who heals/mends" or "doctor"). The wupiye can often be divided into two groups, the pejutu wicušu/winyelu ("medicine man/woman") whose healing procedures do not necessarily invoke supernatural assistance, and the wičháša wakhá ("holy man"), who invokes such entities as helpers. When herbs are collected for use in healing practices, it is expected that a small quantity of tobacco will be given in exchange, scattered by the plant or buried beneath it. The herbs collected will then be kept away from any menstruating woman. In rites where spirits are invoked for a healing purpose, these entities might stipulate certain instructions that the patient must then follow.

A wičháhmuğa ("bewitcher", "witch") describes a person who uses supernatural powers to purposefully harm others. It is feared that these individuals can kill with incantations, pervert the ton of things such as water so that they become harmful, and turn humans into other animals. Using their helper spirit, they can extract a person's hair at a distance and thus cause this victim headaches and nosebleeds, eventually leading to their death. Between the 1970s and 1990s, fears about witchcraft became a growing presence in Lakota reservations. Certain animal species are also deemed capable of causing humans supernatural harm.

=== Holy men ===
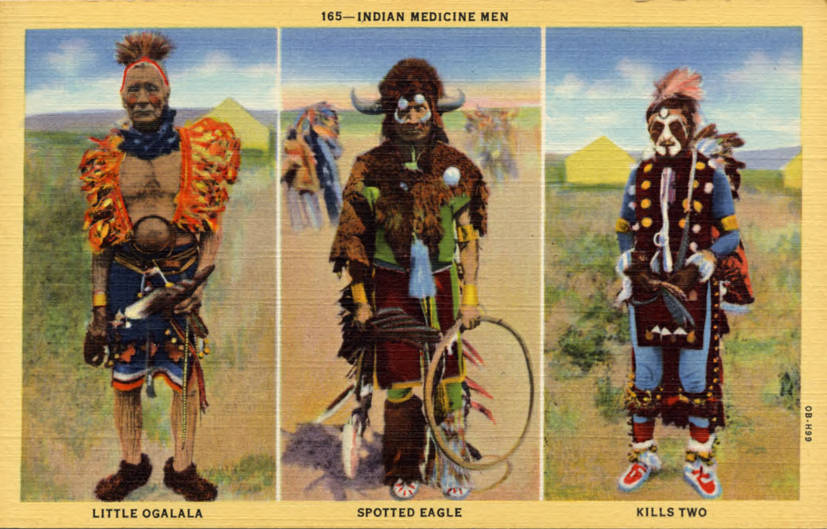
Early 20th century images of three different Lakota holy men

Certain Lakota individuals provide a range of ritual services, including healing, counselling, locating missing persons or objects, predicting the future, directing ceremonies, and conjuring spirits. Although the Lakota term for these individuals is wičháša wakhá, English-language terms such as "doctor" and "medicine man" may instead be used loosely for the benefit of non-Lakota speakers. Other English language terms that have become popular among Lakota since the 1960s have included "holy man", "spiritual leader," "spiritual advisor" and "mentor". The term waphíye wičháša ("doctor man") is sometimes applied to any ritual healer, but is often reserved for those who practice herbalism without any ceremonial conjuring.

Holy men derive their powers of interpretation from their communing with supernatural forces. In Lakota traditional culture, it is believed that a dream will often set a person on the path to becoming a ritual specialist. They might then consult an experienced elder about their dream, and the latter often urge them to undertake a vision quest. Once the vision quest is over and they have received a vision, the seeker may start training as a ritual specialist under an experienced practitioner. It is believed that during the vision, a wakʽą being may instruct the vision-seeker in a particular ceremony, the use of herbs, or some other religious skill. The vision may also lead to taboos being imposed on the dreamer, for instance that they must not fall in love or keep money rendered for their services. Holy men become conduits through which wakʽą flows, but they cannot completely control this force. Many stories of ritual specialists using trickery circle in Lakota communities; some believe that this makes these individuals frauds, although other Lakota regard a certain element of trickery as being part of the performance.

These specialists gain contact with wakʽąpi through dreams or visions, and are expected to undergo vision quests at least annually. It is believed that they gain new knowledge and new power through each vision, possessing more šicųpi. The more šicųpi a specialist has, the more powerful their ceremonies are believed to be. At the same time, growing power means the holy man poses greater potential danger both to himself and to those around him. By helping others, the holy man gives away some of his šicųpi, ultimately weakening him. By the time they are elderly, they are regarded as being largely without power, and may be subject to ridicule and mistrust. Their ritual paraphernalia is often destroyed when they die.

Someone seeking the assistance of a ritual specialist will approach them with a pipe and tobacco, an offering termed the opaĝi, after which the specialist will then decide whether they will help. If the holy man feels that the afflicted person is being punished for a misdemeanour then they may refuse to assist them. If they accept the task then they will give the client instructions.

==== Yuwípi and yuwípi wičháša ====
In his repetition of Lakota themes and values, the yuwipi practitioner reaffirms and strengthens tribal identity. The recounting of myths and songs, the repeated testimonials, the emphasis on the unity of the living, the departed dead, and the historical heroes, all forge stronger links between the participants in yuwipi ceremonies and help them glory in their differentiation from off-reservation culture.

— Thomas H. Lewis, 1987

Another Lakota rite is the yuwípi, the name of which means "they wrap him" or "to wrap". This is a type of ceremony known widely among Plains and Woodlands Native groups, bearing close similarities with the Ojibwe and Cree tent-shaking rite. A client may sponsor a yuwípi to request the spirits assist with healing, retrieving lost objects, dealing with legal problems, or as a thanksgiving to a task already accomplished by the spirits.

Among the Lakota, the yuwípi is conducted by a specialist called the yuwípi wičháša (yuwípi man), a figure who may also call himself an iyeska ("interpreter, medium"). The yuwípi wičháša does not wear distinctive clothing, although is typically accorded respect with the honorific term thukášila. They are typically called to the profession through visions, after which they are apprenticed to an existing practitioner. On taking on the role, they are expected to revitalize their powers through regular vision quests, handle their sacred pipe correctly, and avoid menstruating women; should their ritual paraphernalia come into contact with a menstruating woman it is believed that it will lose its efficacy. Yuwípi wičháša often also utilize stones containing a šicų spirit.

Having previously undertaken a sweat lodge ceremony, the yuwípi wičháša will go to the place where the yuwípi is being held and set out objects to demarcate the ceremonial hocoka area. At one end will be the makhákağapi ("made of earth"), an altar of soil, usually taken from underground rather than the surface to ensure it has not been polluted by humans. The yuwípi wičháša will be alone inside this ceremonial area; the spectators remain outside, where they may sit or dance in-place. Each may wear a protective sprig of sage; some attendees will offer pieces of their flesh, typically then placed in a rattle. During the rite, participants often sing or drum to call the spirits.

Tunkasila wamayank uye yo eye
Tunkasila wamayank uye yo eye
Mitakuye ob wani kte lo eye ya
hoyewayelo eye ye.

Grandfather, come to see me.
Grandfather, come to see me.
So that my relatives and I will
live, I am sending my voice.

— A yuwípi song

The yuwípi wičháša will often be tied up with rope or leather thongs, sometimes wrapped within a quilt. While bound, they will seek visions from the wakʽą spirits. With the room in darkness, he will announce the names of spirits that he claims have arrived in the space, and spectators can then give him questions and prayers to relay to the spirits. He will also encourage the spirits to heal anyone with ailments. The shaking of rattles is deemed to reveal the spirits' presence; the stone spirits are also thought to manifest in blue sparks and lights. When the lights are turned on, the yuwípi wičháša will appear freed from his bonds, claiming that the spirits untied them. A pipe may then be smoked by the attendees. The yuwípi wičháša will dismantle the altar and ceremonial area, after which a feast may be held.

Scholar of religion Paul B. Steinmetz suggested that the yuwípi became the most common traditional rite among the Lakota during the reservation period due to an absence of alternatives. Around the 1960s, yuwípi were the most popular traditional religious ceremonies on the Pine Ridge and Rosebud reservations, although the number of yuwípi wičháša had declined substantially by the 1990s. As well as seeking to treat sickness, the yuwípi wičháša may also be invited to supervise the sun dance. There is often much competitiveness between yuwípi wičháša as they seek to build their own client bases. If a yuwípi wičháša is exposed for fraudulently producing phenomena, they may leave their reservation in disgrace. It is believed that the power of the yuwípi wičháša usually decreases over time as they give away their spirits. When one of them dies, their ritual paraphernalia is usually buried with them or burned.

==== Other specialists ====
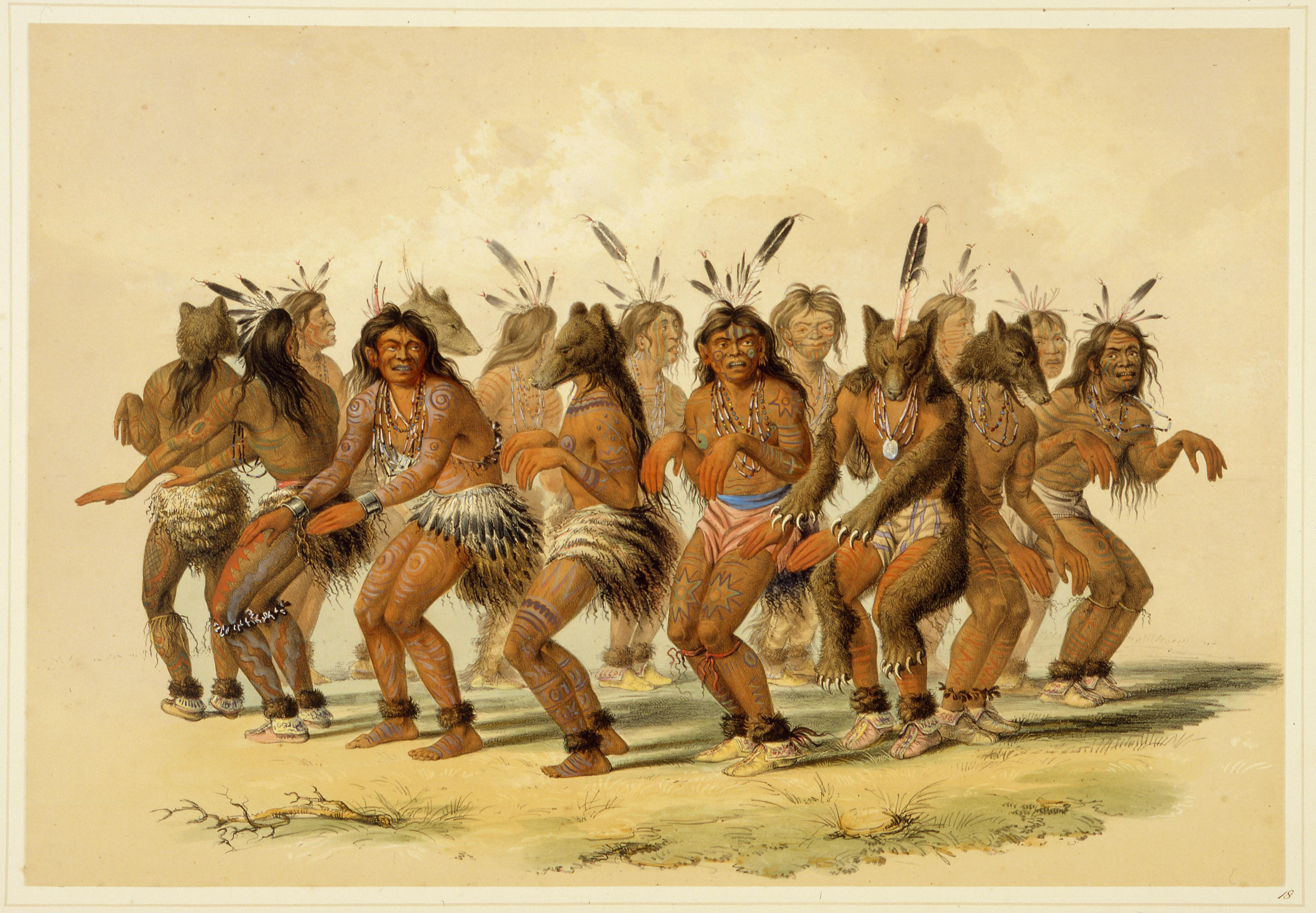
George Catlin's illustration of the bear dance from 1844

Certain other ritual healers have ceremonies different from the yuwípi, although several of these declined under government suppression in the reservation era. These groups were often dream societies, consisting of individuals who had encountered the same spirit entities in their dreams. Every member of this group would then share similar medicines, songs, and prayers.

Often, these dreams would connect a person to a particular non-human oyaté. Previously found in Lakota religion was the mathó waphíye or bear doctor, a specialist in treating wounds. The bear ritual entailed possession by the spirit of the bear, at which the possessed individual behaved like a bear. This also involved wearing the skin and head of a bear while carrying out healing procedures; any medicinal roots they required were dug up with a bear claw. Bear doctors were formerly found throughout indigenous Plains and Woodland communities and among the Lakota were probably common prior to the move to the reservations. The last known bear doctor active on Pine Ridge died in 1965; Feraca suggested that at the start of the 21st century none remained among the Lakota.

Eagle doctors were assisted by their contact with eagle spirits. The Heĥaka ihanblapi ("they dream of elks") were a sodality who dressed as elks during their ceremonies and were thought to have powers over women. The Sinte sapela ("black tails") were similar, but were devoted to black tailed deer rather than elks. The Mato ihanplapi ("they dream of bears") dressed as bears during their ceremonies, while the Tatang ihablapi ("they dream of buffalo bulls") dressed as buffalo. The Šunkmahetu ihanblapi were inspired by wolves and prepared war medicine for protecting Lakota warriors from their enemies.

Those who dream of the wakįyą thunder spirits often become heyókha (clowns). They are regarded as being friends of the wakįyą. They behave in ways contrary to custom, for instance by walking backwards, or dressing warmly in summer and wearing little in winter. They are often deemed amusing although also thought capable of bringing catastrophe, and capable of undoing the work of other holy men. A major heyókha ceremony is the heyókha kaga ("clown making ceremony"), involving a dance around a pot of boiling dog meat. Heyókha are expected to participate in the Omaha (grass) dances; although historically sometimes forbidden from the sun dance, they have appeared at 21st century sun dances, where their function was to test the commitment of the dancers by taunting them.

== History ==
=== Prehistory ===
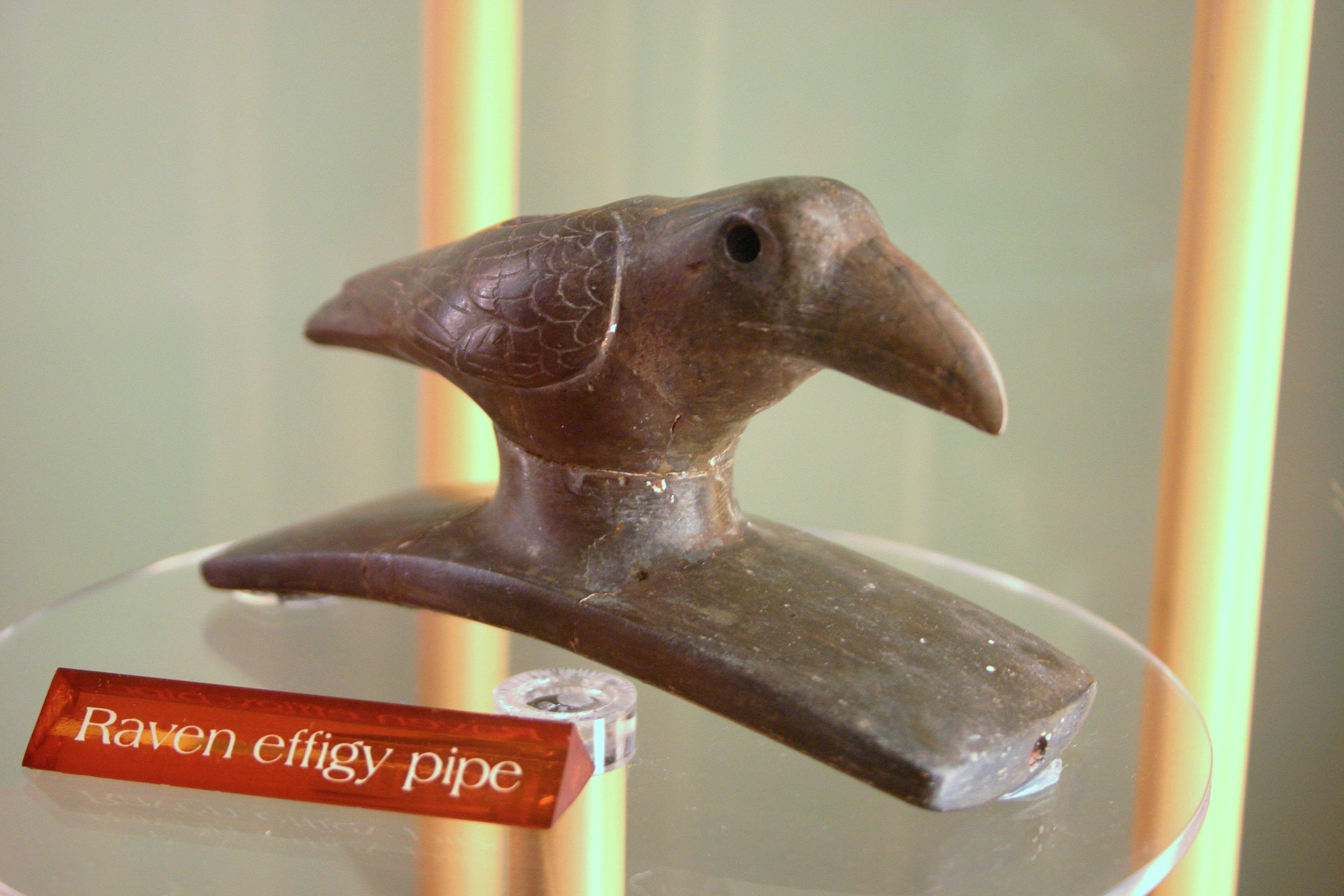
A carved pipe part from the Hopewell culture; these Hopewell pipes suggest a longstanding heritage to the Lakota use of the sacred pipe.

The prehistory of Sioux-speaking peoples "is at best conjectural". It is possible that the different Sioux communities originated as a single group, and this common origin may be reflected in certain underlying religious ideas shared across contemporary Sioux communities. Various developments in Sioux religion prior to the 19th century can be suggested. Feraca noted that what archaeologists term the Prairie and Woodland cultures "still have bearing" on Lakota religion. The Hopewell tradition Mound Builders of the Ohio Valley, for instance, utilized elaborate pipes, suggesting a lengthy heritage to the Lakota belief in the sacred pipe.

Linguistic reconstruction places the homeland of the Lakota's ancestors, the proto-Western Siouans, to the west of Lake Michigan, an area encompassing southern Wisconsin, southeast Minnesota, northeast Iowa, and northern Illinois. By the start of the 16th century, the Sioux-speaking peoples were living on the headwaters of the River Mississippi. They first encountered Europeans in the mid-17th century. At that time, the ancestors of the Lakota were members of a broad confederation that called itself the Oceti Šakowin, usually translated as the Seven Council Fires. From 1640, Europeans referred to the Oceti Šakowin as the Sioux, a term borrowed from the Ojibwe, in whose language it was a pejorative word meaning "lesser, or small, adder." The Oceti Šakowin spoke three mutually intelligible dialects of what came to be called the Sioux language: Dakota, Nakota, and Lakota. Over time, these linguistic demarcations also came to define political units.

=== Encounters with Christianity and colonialism ===
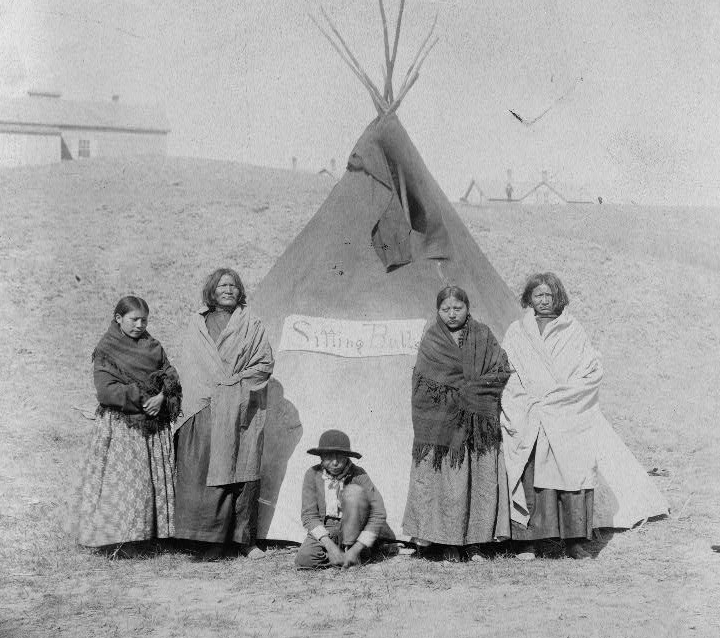
The family of the Lakota man Sitting Bull, photographed in 1891

Christian contact with the Sioux-speaking peoples began circa 1665 when the Jesuit missionaries Claude Allouez and Jacques Marquette met with Dakota groups, an event followed by sporadic Roman Catholic missionary visits to the Sioux throughout the 17th and 18th centuries. In the 18th century, the Lakota were among the Sioux-speaking peoples who began to migrate west, a process encouraged by conflict with the Ojibwe and Cree. After 1750 they entered the Black Hills area. By the early 19th century, the Lakota had adopted the use of the horse, providing greater mobility and wealth and generating radical transformations of their culture.

Sioux-speaking peoples first encountered official representatives of the United States government in the early 19th century. By the mid-19th century, the U.S. government's approach to Native Americans was to encourage them to move onto reservations. The Sioux Treaty of 1868 resulted in many Lakota moving onto the Great Sioux Reservation. In 1876, the US Department of War ordered all Lakota to remain confined to this reservation; some Lakota, such as groups led by Sitting Bull and Crazy Horse, resisted. In 1876, the US government took the Black Hills from the Lakota and Yanktonias. This loss of the Black Hills became a recurring theme in Lakota religion, with many Lakota subsequently maintaining that their people originated from the Black Hills. In 1878, new agencies were set up within the Great Sioux Reservation; the Pine Ridge Agency was for the Oglalás, the Rosebud Agency was for the Sičhą́ǧus. Pine Ridge and Rosebud became separate reservations in 1889.

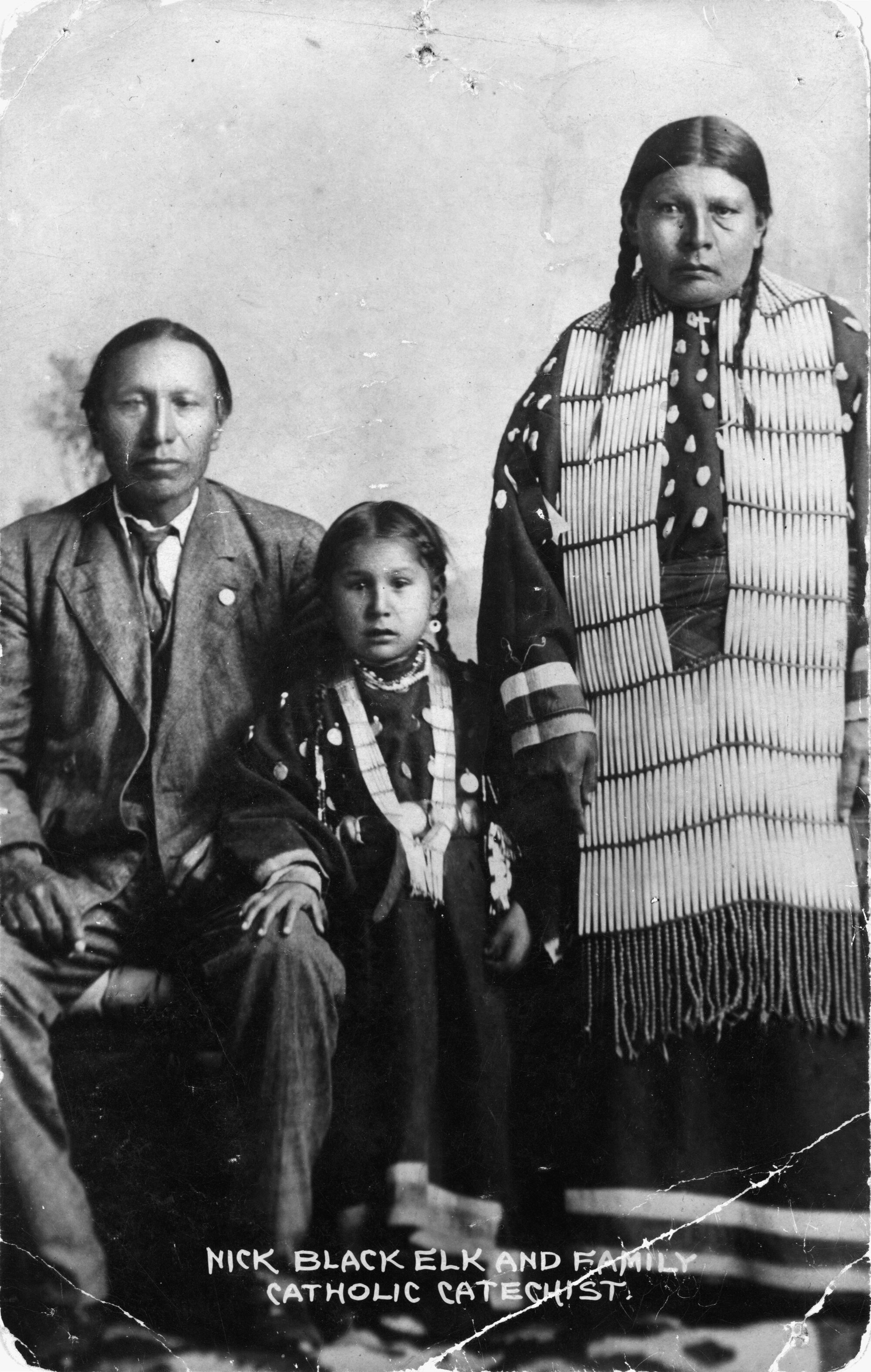
Photograph of Black Elk and his family; his descriptions of Lakota religion are an important record

Establishing the reservations assisted Christian proselytization among the Lakota, although Christian conversion did not always mean the rejection of traditional practices. Various Christian groups were active in missionizing to the Lakota; Roman Catholic Jesuits were present by the 1880s, while the Mormons established a presence on the reservations in the 20th century. In tandem with the Christianization process was the federal government suppression of traditional ceremonies. In 1883, a Bureau of Indian Affairs edict banned the Lakota's practice of the sun dance and traditional funeral practices. Perhaps because they were aware of the imminent ban, the 1881 sun dance ceremony at Pine Ridge featured over 40 dancers, more than usual. Despite the 1883 ban, there are accounts of sun dances later taking place in secret.

The Lakota also absorbed religious influences from other Native groups. Having originated among the Paiute in 1889, the Ghost Dance movement spread throughout the Great Plains and by 1890 had attracted growing popularity among Lakota. U.S. authorities sought to suppress the Ghost Dance, and when trying to arrest its leaders among the Lakota they killed Sitting Bull. Tensions intensified and led to the Massacre at Wounded Knee in 1890, an event with a profound psychological impact on the Lakota. In the 1900s, the peyote religion of the Native American Church spread into the Lakota reservations by members of the Ho-Chunk and Omaha people. The Lakota were among the last to embrace peyotism, with some participating in both peyotism and traditional Lakota ceremonies.

Extensive records of Lakota religion were made in the 19th century, both by non-Native collectors like James R. Walker as well as by Lakota such as George Bushotter, George Sword, Thomas Tyon, and Ivan Stars who wrote in their own language. No other Native Plains community saw their religious traditions recorded to such an extent. Further records were made in the early 20th century, primarily by Black Elk, an Oglála holy man who dictated his beliefs to both John G. Neihardt and Joseph Epes Brown; these were first published as Black Elk Speaks in 1932. As well as having been involved in the Ghost Dance, Black Elk was committed to both traditional religion and to Catholicism, and taught that God had intended the Lakota's traditional religion to prepare them for the arrival of the Gospel.

=== Revivalism ===
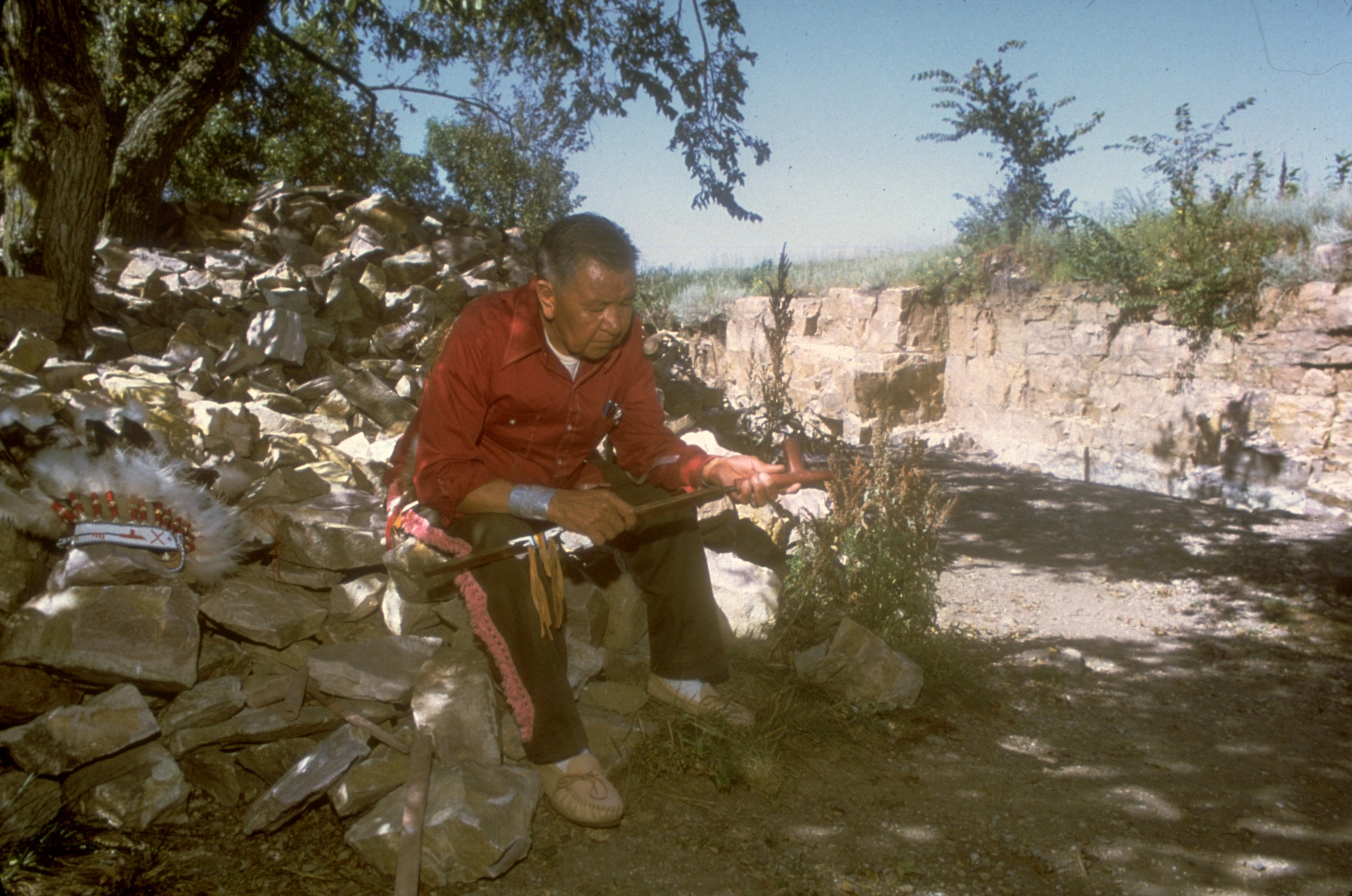
A Lakota man making a pipe at Pipestone National Monument in Minnesota

In 1934, John Collier, head of the Bureau of Indian Affairs, issued a circular ending the Bureau's objections to traditional Native American religions, allowing for a revival of many Lakota traditional practices. Revived sun dances occurred from at least 1924, with the first major example taking place in 1934, coming to be known as "the First Annual Sun Dance." The "locus for contemporary religious revitalization" came from the Lakota communities of South Dakota, especially those on the reservations at Pine Ridge, Rosebud, Cheyenne River, and Standing Rock. Ritual leaders from these reservations subsequently stimulated revivals among other Sioux-speaking communities in North Dakota, Nebraska, Minnesota, Montana, Manitoba, and Saskatchewan.

The 1960s and 1970s saw a revitalization of Lakota religion. From the 1960s, Christian leaders on Lakota reservations became more open to including traditional Lakota elements in their worship. Following the Second Vatican Council, Roman Catholic missionaries for instance increasingly interpreted traditional religion through the lens of fulfilment theology, the notion that Christianity fulfilled ideas foreshadowed in earlier traditions. Thus, they interpreted the sacred pipe as a foreshadowing of Jesus Christ, linked White Buffalo Woman with the Virgin Mary, and associated the sun dance tree with the Cross of the Crucifixion. In 1971 Black Elk Speaks was republished and became a bestseller, making a significant contribution to the reclamation of Lakota religion. In 1978, the U.S. government passed the American Indian Religious Freedom Act, ensuring religious freedom to groups like the Lakota.

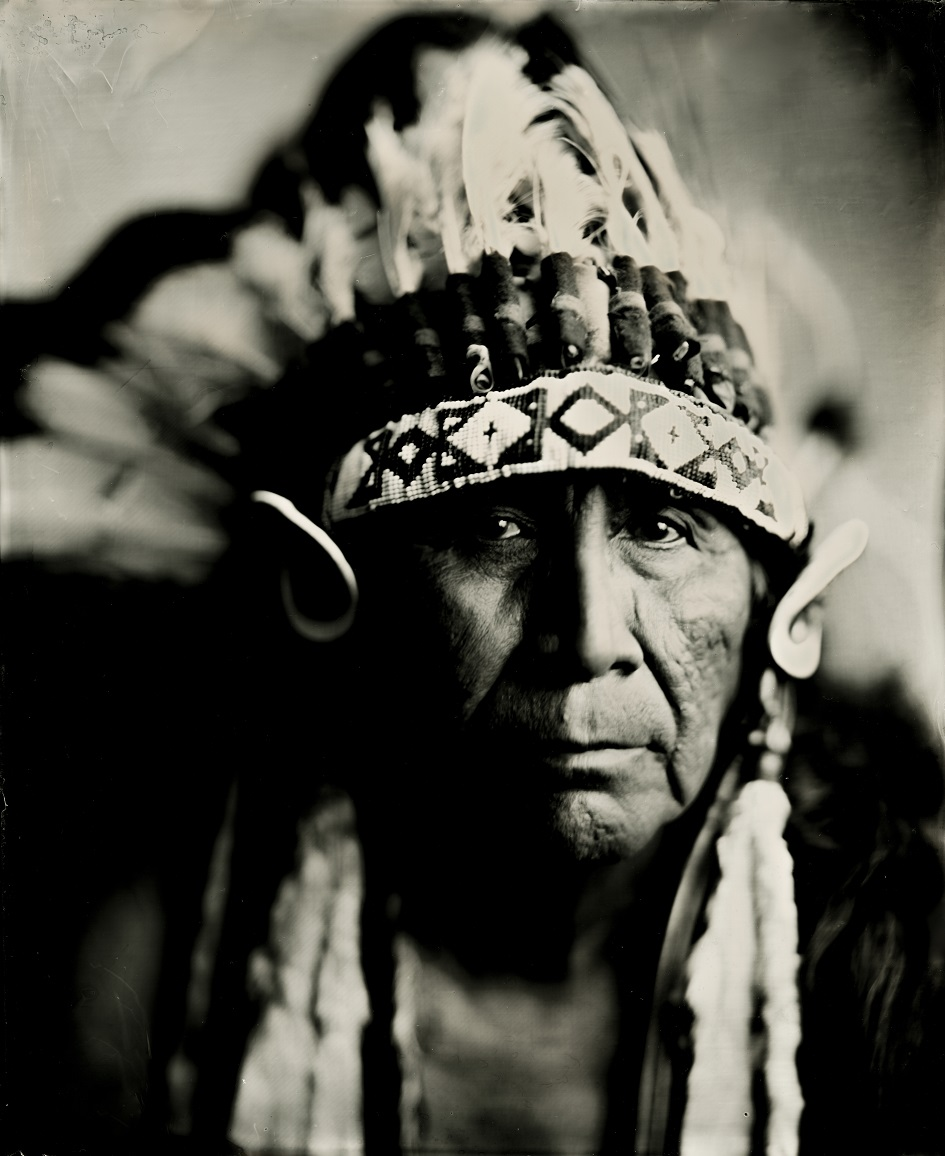
Arvol Looking Horse, the 19th Keeper of the Sacred White Buffalo Calf Pipe, who issued a 2003 proclamation to try and limit non-Native participation in Lakota rites

The embrace of Lakota traditional religion was helped, as Feraca observed, by "an atmosphere of New Nativism". The New Nativist movement influenced various Lakota practices; it has been attributed as the reason behind medicine men conducting weddings, something that only developed in the 1960s. In 1968, several Ojibwe Natives founded the American Indian Movement (AIM) activist group. AIM soon gained a Lakota focus as its members sought the guidance of Lakota religious leader Leonard Crow Dog. With the support of Lakota elders, in 1973 AIM members occupied Wounded Knee. They were besieged by U.S. federal authorities and several occupiers were killed. AIM politicized Lakota religion, transforming it into a symbol of resistance as part of an anti-colonial ideology; they for instance converted the Lakota's sacred pipe into a Pan-Indian symbol. AIM also assisted in promoting Lakota ceremonies to other Native American groups. By the early 21st century, for instance, the sweat lodge ceremony had spread to indigenous communities across North America.

During the 20th century some Lakota, such as Fools Crow, encouraged a universalization of Lakota spirituality. Elements of Lakota religion that proved particularly attractive to non-Lakota included the vision quest, sweat lodge, the idea of the "medicine wheel," as well as Lakota uses of the pipe, drum, and specific Plains herbs like sage and sweetgrass. Various Lakota began to accuse non-Natives who adopted these practices of cultural appropriation, an accusation they did not typically also level at Native Americans of other groups. In 1993, 500 representatives of the Lakota, Nakota, and Dakota Nations ratified a Declaration of War against Exploiters of Lakota Spirituality, a document written by Lakota activists from Pine Ridge. In 2003, Arvol Looking Horse, the Keeper of the Buffalo Calf Pipe, issued a proclamation prohibiting non-Native entry to the hocoka spaces during the seven sacred rites. Certain other Lakota, such as Leonard Crow Dog, spoke against Looking Horse's proclamation, and the Afraid of Bear/American Horse Sun Dance in the Black Hills announced that it would not impose ethnic restrictions on involvement, seeing such an attitude as contrary to the spirit of mitakuye oyasin.

== Demographics ==
A study conducted on the Pine Ridge Reservation during the 2000s found that 29% of respondents described themselves as followers of Lakota religion exclusively, 28% said that they combined Lakota religion with Christianity, and 41% stated that they only followed Christianity. A majority of those who considered themselves fully or three-quarters Lakota identified with Lakota religion, while those who identified as a quarter or less Lakota were more likely to identify as Christian.

== Reception and influence ==
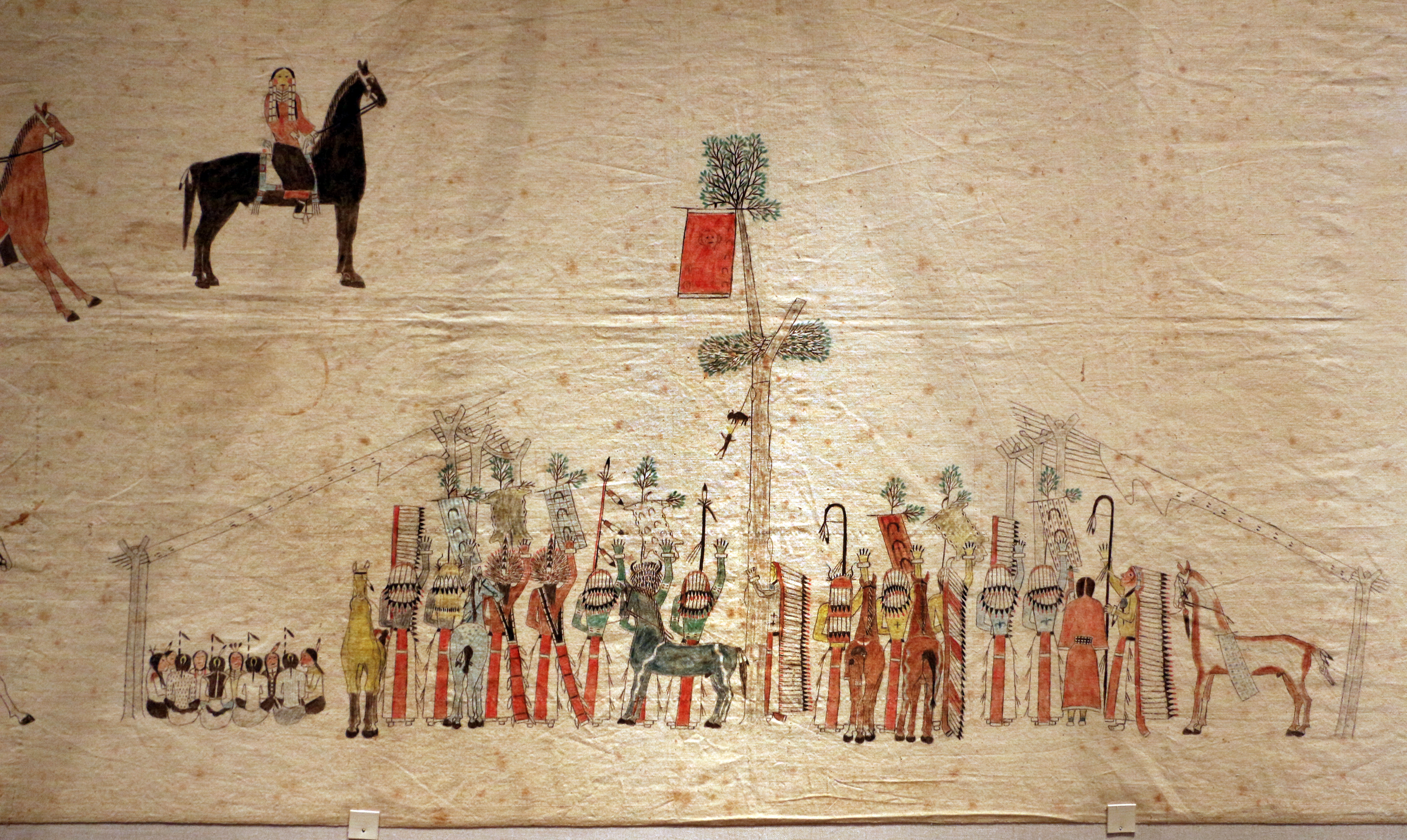
A Lakota portrayal of a sun dance from 1885, on display at the Art Institute of Chicago.

Christian fundamentalists active among Sioux communities have typically actively opposed traditional religious expression and sought to transcend differences between indigenous and non-indigenous communities. Christian missionaries tried to adapt traditional Lakota beliefs to assist conversion. They for instance sought to use the term Wakʽą Tʽąką to describe their God and the term wakʽą šicų for demons.

Lakota religion is one of the "most visible" Native American traditions in the United States, a situation resulting both from the work of many anthropologists as well as from the focus placed on the Lakota in many American films. The religion's practices have therefore attracted attention and been adopted by many non-Lakota, whether Native American or non-Native, the latter including many New Agers. Various Native critics have spoken against those promoting Native-derived practices to non-Native audiences, with Sun Bear and Lynn Andrews being particularly targeted for criticism. These critics are often unhappy with people commodifying Native practices for their personal enrichment while indigenous communities continue to struggle both economically and culturally. Lakota and other Native American voices objecting to the non-Native uses of Lakota-derived practices have centred on four points. The first is that Native practices are being sold indiscriminately to anyone who can pay; the second is that non-Native practitioners may present themselves as an expert after taking only a workshop or course. The third is that non-Natives remove these ceremonies from their original context, and the fourth is that these practices are often blended with other, non-Native elements and worldviews.
