= Iya (mythology) =

In Lakota mythology, Iya is a storm-monster, brother of Iktomi the spider. He is the son of Unk Cekala. He eats humans, animals and consumes villages to satisfy his otherwise endless appetite. He is in fact considered a demon in various traditions. The tornado, the snowstorm, the hurricane or the thunderstorm would all be considered manifestations of this deity. He travels with his storms in a tipi painted with magical symbols, and when he appears, he is often faceless and formless. His home is said to be under the waters, where he resides with his mother, Unk.

He is considered to be the chief of the North, symbolically encompassing the spheres of winter, famine and disease. He is the guardian of the Aurora Borealis and holds to a rivalry against both the chief of the South, Okaga, as well as the thunderbirds, though this is vastly exaggerated in tales told to outsiders.

He is the younger brother of Iktomi, and the pair comprises the two progeny of Inyan, the creator, who is the head of the Lakota pantheon.
