= Untunktahe =

Water spirit in Lakota mythology

In Lakota mythology, Untunktahe is a water spirit.

Due to his pride, he constantly challenges against Waukheon.

He is rumoured to be associated with the destructive serpent demon Unhcegila.
