= Mitakuye Oyasin =

Phrase and concept in Lakota culture

Mitákuye Oyás’iŋ is a phrase from the Lakota language. It reflects the world view of interconnectedness held by the Lakota people. It originates from a line of a Lakota folk song.

== Origin Story ==
The origination story from the phrase Mitákuye Oyás’iŋ comes from a Lakota story passed down from oral history. The Lakota attribute their spirituality from the White Buffalo Calf Woman, when she came to the Lakota people she showed them how to make offerings to Mother Earth, Father Sky, and the four directions. It was said that if the Lakota offered their prayers the way she told them then the buffalo would stay near, and the bison would provide for them.

== Meaning ==
The phrase has been translated multiple ways, such as "all my relatives," "we are all related," or "all my relations." Francis White Bird, writing in the Lakota Country Times, argued that a more accurate translation would be "everything is related to the existence of all my Lakota relatives." The phrase does not refer specifically to the individual being interconnected, but rather that all groups are collectively connected to one another. It can be most accurately translated into a single word as "oneness". Specifically, the phrase is a way of life, to treat everything including people, plants, animals, trees, stones, planets, and water are all interconnected as all my relatives.

== Use in prayer and ceremony ==
Mitakuye Oyasin or Mitákuye Oyás’iŋ is used in Lakota religion ceremonial and prayer context, which is also observed by some Dakota and Nakota. It is also used by the Native American Church. The phrase was used also by the Ojibwe during a revival of spirituality in the 1960s, loaned from the Dakota language because the Ojibwe language had yet to experience a revival. The Ojibwe were criticized by some Lakota as "cultural thieves".

Oglala Lakota sources describe the phrase as being spoken at both the beginning and the end of ceremonies. As a concluding expression in prayer, it has also been compared in function to the Christian use of 'Amen'. Osage theologian George Tinker writes that among the Lakota and Dakota, Mitakuye oyasin is used to end prayers and may also be spoken by itself as a complete prayer. As such, according to Tinker, it “functions somewhat like the word ‘Amen’ in European and American Christianity.” The comparison with 'Amen' refers to its function as a prayer ending, rather than to its literal meaning; the phrase itself expresses relationship, interconnectedness and oneness with one’s relatives in an extended sense, including all forms of life: other people, animals, birds, insects, trees and plants, rocks, rivers, mountains and valleys.

It has been compared to the philosophy of Marcus Aurelius as written in his book Meditations, where he writes "Always think of the universe as one living organism."

== See also ==
- Indigenous music of North America
