= Anog Ite =

Lakota mythological creature

In Lakota mythology, Anúŋg Ité is a daughter of Škáŋ and wife of Tate. She has two faces.

She was tricked by Iktómi to attempt to seduce Wi, but failed when Škáŋ tells Wi that he has forgotten his wife. For attempting to undo the proper order and place herself in Hanwi's position and forgetting her own family, one of her two faces was made ugly as punishment. She was the mother of the Four Winds and Yum, the whirlwind. Because she was separated from her children, she causes pains to pregnant woman and makes babies cry. She was also said to have taught the Lakota how to separate porcupine quills and dye them.

== See also ==
- Anpao, a two-faced god of dawn in Lakota mythology.
