= Anpao =

Spirit in Sioux mythology

In Sioux mythology (Indigenous American mythological tradition that includes Lakota mythology), Anpao (Lakota: Aŋpáo), or Anp, is a spirit with two faces that represents the dawn.

Anpao dances with Han, a primordial spirit of darkness, to ensure that Wi does not burn up the Earth, resulting in day and night.

George Bushotter (Yankton Dakota-Lakota, 1860–1892) wrote that when his younger brother was ill, the brother was told to pray to Anpao, the Dawn, and recovered.

Anpao zi is the "yellow of the dawn", which oral history described as the meadowlark's breast.

== See also ==
- Anog Ite, a two-faced goddess from Lakota mythology
- Bangpūtys, two-faced Lithuanian god whose focus is on the weather and the sea
- Hausos, PIE dawn goddess, reflexes of whom are common in daughter cultures
- Ikenga, two-faced Igbo spirit of fate, fortune, and achievement
- Isimud, two-faced Mesopotamian messenger god
- Janus, two-faced Roman god whose focus is on doorways, endings, and beginnings in general
- Two-Face, a monster from Plains Indian mythology
- Sharp-Elbows, a monster from Ioway folklore sometimes described with two faces
