= Wohpe =

In Lakota mythology, Wóȟpe (less correctly spelled "Wohpe") is a spirit of peace, the daughter of Wi and the Moon, Haŋhépi-Wi. She is the wife of the south wind. When she visited the Earth, she gave the Lakota people a pipe as a symbol of peace. Later, Wóȟpe became conflated with White Buffalo Calf Woman. An alternative name for Wóȟpe is Ptehíŋčalasaŋwiŋ.

As a symbol of Wophe's coming to earth she is often associated with falling stars.

== See also ==
- Dignity (statue)
