= Skan =

In Lakota tradition, Škaŋ is the Motion of the universe. The Great Spirit, Wakȟáŋ Tȟáŋka, reflected upon himself and created the four Superior Spirits, Wi (the first to be created, bringing light to the world), Skan, Maka (Mother Earth) and Íŋyaŋ (the solid support of the Earth or the rock associated with the natural forces of the Earth). In the beginning, Wakáŋ Taŋka, The Great Mystery, reflected upon itself and created the four Superior Spirits. The first was Inyan, the Rock. Íŋyaŋ created a companion, Makhá, the earth. Then Sky, or Škaŋ, was created to wrap around the first two. All was still dark, so lastly Wí, the Sun, was created to give light.

Škaŋ is the source of all animated life. All things have a spirit, and this spirit is given to it by Škaŋ when the thing is created. These spirits come from the stars. When a thing dies, the spirits return to Skan and the stars.
