= Yuwipi =

Yuwipi is a traditional Lakota healing ceremony. During the ceremony the healer is tied up with a special blanket and ropes, and the healer and their supporters pray and sing for the healing of the person who has asked for the ceremony. The ceremony may be performed for one person at a time, or for a small group of people together, depending on the severity of the case and the strength and ability of the medicine man leading the ceremony.

== History ==
In Lakota culture, the yuwipi (pronounced yoo-WEE-pee) ceremony is held for both physical and spiritual healing. Yuwipi means "they wrap him up" or "they tie him up". The ceremony can be performed at any time of year when healing is needed.

== Yuwipi Ceremony ==
=== Spirits ===
The spirits called upon vary with individual medicine men, as well with the goals of the ceremony. The spirits may be human ancestor spirits or they can be animal spirits. Animal spirits can be birds or they can be four-legged animals.

=== Yuwipi Men ===
The yuwipi man is the healer and the one who is tied up and directs the ceremony. During the ceremony he calls spirits that can help the people. While the traditions and protocols are passed down through generations of healers, each Medicine Man has his own way of conducting the ceremony.

=== Ceremony ===
It is important for the people in attendance to follow specific rules. The medicine man's chanupa (ceremonial pipe) is present during the ceremony, which involves prayer, the drum, and traditional songs. Some songs summon the spirits, and others tell the spirits it is time to leave and end the ceremony.

The ceremony is often very draining for the yuwipi man because of the focus needed to interact with the spirits and because the spirits use his life energy to heal the participants. Due to this, yuwipi men, who do not draw energy from the elements, often live short, difficult lives.
