= Iktomi =

Spider-trickster spirit and culture hero of the Lakota people

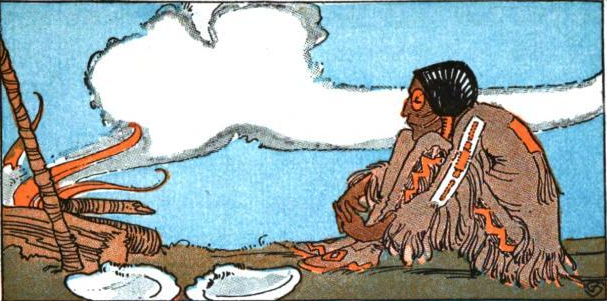
Iktomi depicted sitting by the fire.

In Lakota mythology, Iktómi is a spider-trickster spirit, and a culture hero for the Lakota people. Alternate names for Iktómi include Ikto, Ictinike, Ksa, Inktomi, Unktome, and Unktomi. These names are due to the differences in languages between different indigenous nations, as this spider deity was known throughout many of North America's tribes.

His appearance is that of a spider, but he can take any shape, including that of a human. When he is a human he is said to wear red, yellow and white paint, with black rings around his eyes.

== Story ==
A modern depiction of Iktómi.

The Spider, although most tales involve the trickster figure and center on morality lessons for the young, Iktómi was also the bringer of Lakota culture. He is the first born son of Inyan, the Rock. He was originally called Ksa. According to author James Walker, Iktómi has his roots in Ksa, the god of wisdom: "Because Ksa had used his wisdom to cause a goddess to hide her face in shame and a god to bow his head in grief, Scan, the god of motion condemned him that he should sit at the feasts of gods no more and should sit on the world without a friend, and his wisdom should be only cunning that would entrap him in his own schemes. He named him Iktómi. So Iktómi is the imp of mischief whose delight is to make others ridiculous". The Oglala of South Dakota present Iktómi as the second manifestation, or degeneration, of Ksa, which hatched from the Cosmic Egg being laid by Wak-Inyan, the primordial thunderstorm. Ksa invented language, stories, names and games. In another version Iya is the son of Unk (defined as passion), who detested Ksa. Iya and Unk had an incestuous relationship out of which Gnaski, the demon, was the result. Because of this, and for not taking the advice of Ksa, Unk was expelled from the circle of divine entities. Unk wanted to outwit Ksa with the help of the cunning of Gnaski. Gnaski succeeds in this, mainly because he has no fear of Skan (the Judge, Activity), by sowing confusion. Gnaski enabled this by mimicking Ksa to perfection; therefore, Gnaski is called Ksapela (little wisdom). The first people were not able to distinguish between the two. Through his folly Gnaski entangles Ksa completely, and through the activity of Skan Ksa consequently becomes a spider, the meaning of the name Iktómi.

Iktómi still had the feature of making games. It seems that Iktómi, in stories attributed to him, in his very essence is representing the confusion between wisdom and folly. He began playing malicious tricks because people would jeer at his strange or funny looks. Most of his schemes end with him falling into ruin when his intricate plans backfire. Because it is Iktómi, a respected (or perhaps feared) deity playing the part of the idiot or fool, and the story is told as entertainment, the listener is allowed to reflect on misdeeds without feeling like they are being confronted. In other tales, Iktómi is depicted with dignity and seriousness, such as in the popularized myth of the dreamcatcher.

Iktómi is a shapeshifter, and can use strings to control humans like puppets. He has also the power to make potions that change gods, gain control over people and trick gods and mortals. There are also times he comes to the aid of the Lakota people, giving them ways to protect themselves from evil, live a better life with technology, or warn them of danger.

== Interpretations ==
The tales of Iktómi's propensity for mischief leads many without a full understanding of Native American mythology to believe that he is an evil figure. However, it is not quite that simple. Iktómi can be seen as both good and bad, and has been portrayed in both ways. Many other Native American tricksters, like Mica (Coyote), are often victims of the same misconception. Despite Lakota not expressing hysteria or extreme fear towards Iktómi, generally he is viewed as a being whose gaze is to be avoided, lest trouble find you.

The picture of a spider, of Iktómi, could be used as love magic: by it, the souls of a boy and a girl could be caught and connected. In this case they cannot escape meeting and falling in love. Lame Deer tells a story in which Iktómi saw a group of ducks. He wanted to eat them and that is why he lied that his bag is full of pou-wow songs. The ducks asked him to sing some of them. He agrees, but only if they close their eyes. So he started killing them, while some realized what was happening. Iktómi, says Lame Deer, is like those of the politicians who make us close our eyes, sing and dance for them while they hit us on the head.

Because the Lakota mythology is word of mouth, and traditionally there were no written records, most of the information about Iktómi in Lakota mythology has not been written down or recorded. He has lived on in the retelling of tales and the religious traditions which are passed on from generation to generation, into the modern day.

== In popular culture ==
- In Bryan Fuller's adaptation on Starz of Neil Gaiman's American Gods, Iktómi appears briefly in Season 2 (residing in the "Corn Palace," a roadside grow-op) to provide a mysterious plant and the disassembled Gungnir to an Ifreet. He also appears in the book, but as Wisakedjak or "Whiskey Jack".
- Sioux author Zitkála-Šá, also known by the missionary-given and later married name Gertrude Simmons Bonnin, included tales of Iktómi in her Old Indian Legends, published by Ginn and Company, Boston, in 1901.
- In the Netflix sitcom Unbreakable Kimmy Schmidt, Iktómi is referenced on multiple occasions, as part of a season 3 plot between Jacqueline White and Russ Snyder.
- Iktómi is portrayed in the 2002 film Skins, directed by Cheyenne-Arapaho director Chris Eyre.
- The ill-fated ship in the 2016 PC game Tharsis is named Iktómi.
- He has appeared multiple times in the Megami Tensei video game series and its spinoffs as a demon under the name Ictinike. He was first introduced in the 1995 game Devil Summoner, and has since appeared in Devil Children: Book of Fire and Book of Ice, Devil Survivor 2, Shin Megami Tensei IV, and Shin Megami Tensei IV: Apocalypse. Ictinike is almost always classified as a "genma," a category of demons typically reserved for legendary heroes.
- Iktomi is featured in the Cinemon Entertainment short Coyote and the Rock as a friend to Coyote.
- Iktomi is mentioned in the sitcom Happy's Place season 2, episode 11 "Dart to the Heart".

== See also ==
- Cultural depictions of spiders
- Spider Grandmother
- Anansi

== Bibliography ==
- Zitkala-Ša (2004). Iktomi and the Ducks and Other Sioux Stories. Bison Books. ISBN 978-0-8032-9918-4.
- Lame Deer. Lame Deer, Seeker of Visions.
- Marie L. McLaughlin. Myths and Legends of the Sioux.
- J. R. Walker. The Sun Dance and Other Ceremonies of the Oglala Division of The Teton Dakota.
- Pliny Earle Goddard. Jicarilla Apache Texts.
- Philip Jenkins. Dream Catchers: How Mainstream America Discovered Native Spirituality (2004)
