= Unhcegila =

Serpentoid beast in Lakota mythology

In Lakota mythology, Unk Cekula (uŋȟčéǧila or uŋkčéǧila) is a serpentoid creature which was responsible for many unexplained disappearances and deaths. Her male counterpart is known as Unk Tehi.

== Description ==
She was described at first as having no real shape or form; she had eyes of fire, and a fanged mouth that was shrouded in a smoky or cloudy mass. As time went on further, her form was exposed as being massive, with a long scaly body whose natural armor was almost impenetrable. Her eyes burned with wrathful hunger, her claws were like iron, and her voice raged like thunder rolling in the clouds.

Whoever looked upon her will become blind or go insane.

Her weakness is the seventh spot on her torso, behind which lies her heart. To kill her, one has to shoot a medicine arrow at this flaw in her natural armor.

== Accounts ==
The ancient Lakota tribes of the Northwest had heard rumors from neighboring tribes that a Giant Evil Spirit had emerged from the icy waters of the far Northeast Atlantic. In time the creature and its companion had fought their way across the eastern coast into the midwest, with many different tribes finding ways to scare off the monsters. Until they made their way to the Black Hills (Pahá Sápa) and sought a new home in the mountains. Once she and her companion arrived and made a place in the mountains. She coexisted with everyone, from the tribes to the Wamakaskan and the other spirit beings. During this time she and her companion began to prepare to spawn offspring. Many different Tribal Clans and Nagi that lived in the Black Hills learned of the monsters' plans and began making plans to prevent anymore monsters from becoming a threat. Unk Cekula and Unk Tehi coexisted with nature because they were only two that were sustained by nature, but if there were more monsters that needed to kill for survival it meant that more animals and people would die to feed them. This forced everyone to act, before she became the cause of chaos and fear.

Over the many years in which she wreaked havoc in the hills, she was challenged by many warriors from the Lakota tribe. It was learned that the creature had offspring, and the tribes had to kill them when they began feeding on people.

In one myth, Unk Cekula fights with and kills a giant bear, whose fallen body produced the Bear Butte in the Black Hills.

She was slain after she ate the family of a great warrior from the bear clan. This warrior was told by a Weasel spirit that if he was to get swallowed by Unk Cekula, he could use his knife to cut his way out of the belly of the beast and free the other victims. Alternatively, two twin brothers, one of whom was blind, killed Unk Cekula using arrows given to them by a medicine woman.

Some accounts state that the brothers' arrows did not kill Unk Cekula, but only injured her so greatly that she damaged the land as she writhed away. As she finally died, the Sun scorched her flesh and dried up the land, resulting in the arid rock formations and skeletons found in the Badlands (Makȟóšiča).

In another myth, Unk Cekula emerged from the primordial waters to flood the land. The resulting devastation angered Wakinyan, who flapped his wings to create a great storm to dry up the land and shoot lightning, killing Unk Cekula. Her heart was destroyed, but her bones were scattered across the land.

== In popular culture ==
A fictionalized version of the myth appeared in a Marvel Comics Presents story arc starring Wolverine.

She appears in a story told in the 2003 film Dreamkeeper, in which Eagle Boy is the one who slays her with weapons given to him by an old woman.

Unk Cekula appears in the urban fantasy novel Boundary Lines by Melissa F. Olson.

She appears briefly in the urban fantasy prequel Death Valley Magic by Linsey Hall.

J.K Rowling's Ilvermoney House, The Horned Serpents, refers to the Unktechi, or the children of Unchegila.

== See also ==
- Horned Serpent, including Unk Tehi, and her other counterparts from other Native American cultures.
- Apep, another monstrous Reptilian defeated by the Spirits.
- Tiamat, a primordial ocean goddess from Mesopotamia who is also associated with serpents.
