= Wakan Tanka =

Lakota word for the sacred or the divine

In Lakota spirituality, Wakan Tanka (Standard Lakota Orthography: Wakȟáŋ Tȟáŋka) is the term for the sacred or the divine. This is usually translated as the "Great Spirit" and occasionally as "Great Mystery".

Wakȟáŋ Tȟáŋka can be interpreted as the power or the sacredness that resides in everything, resembling some animistic and pantheistic beliefs. This term describes every creature and object as wakȟáŋ ("holy") or having aspects that are wakȟáŋ. The element Tanka or Tȟáŋka corresponds to "Great" or "large".

Before contact with European Christian missionaries, the Lakota used Wakȟáŋ Tȟáŋka to refer to an organization or group of sacred entities whose ways were mysterious: thus, "The Great Mystery". Activist Russell Means also promoted the translation "Great Mystery" and the view that Lakota spirituality is not monotheistic.

== Cognate terms in other languages ==
Siouan: Wakan Tanka or Wakan is also known as Wakanda in the Omaha-Ponca, Ioway-Otoe-Missouri, Kansa and Osage languages; and Wakatakeh in Quapaw.

== See also ==
- Manitou
- Orenda
- Sioux language
