= White Buffalo Calf Woman =

Sacred woman of supernatural origin, central to the Lakota religion

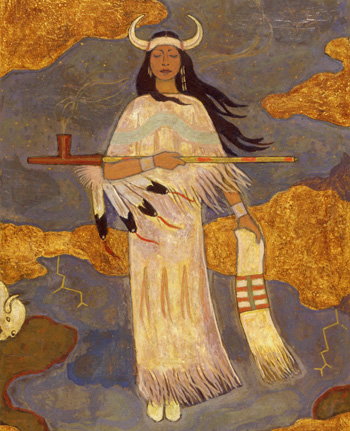
Apparition of the Buffalo Calf Maiden by Frithjof Schuon (1959)

White Buffalo Calf Woman (Lakȟótiyapi: Ptesáŋwiŋ) or White Buffalo Maiden is a sacred woman of supernatural origin, central to the Lakota religion as the primary cultural prophet. Oral traditions relate that she brought the "Seven Sacred Rites" to the Lakota people.

== Story ==
The traditional story is that, around the tenth century (going by the winter counts) there was a time of famine. The chief of the Lakota sent out two scouts to hunt for food. While the young men travelled they saw a white cloud in the distance. Then, from the cloud, they saw a woman. As they approached, they saw that it was a beautiful young Native woman in white buckskin. She had dark hair, dark skin and dark eyes. One of the men was filled with lust for the woman. He approached her, telling his companion he would attempt to claim her as a wife. His companion warned him that she appeared to be a sacred woman, and to do anything sacrilegious would be dangerous and disrespectful, but his advice was ignored.

The second man watched as the first approached and embraced the woman, during which time the cloud enveloped the pair. When the cloud disappeared, only the mysterious woman and a pile of the first man's bones remained. The remaining man was frightened, and began to draw his bow. But the holy woman beckoned him forward, telling him that no harm would come to him, as she could see into his heart and he did not have the motives the first man had. As the woman spoke Lakota, the young man decided she was one of his people, and came forward.

At this time, the woman explained that she was wakȟáŋ (holy, having spiritual and supernatural powers). She further explained that if he did as she instructed, his people would rise again. The scout promised to do what she instructed, and was told to return to his encampment, call the Council, and prepare a feast for her arrival. She taught the Lakota seven sacred ceremonies to protect the Mother Earth and gave them the čhaŋnúŋpa, the sacred ceremonial pipe.

The seven ceremonies are:

1. Inípi (purification lodge)
2. Haŋbléčheyapi (crying for vision)
3. Wiwáŋyaŋg Wačhípi (Sun Dance)
4. Huŋkalowaŋpi (making of relatives)
5. Išnáthi Awíčhalowaŋpi (female puberty ceremony)
6. Tȟápa Waŋkáyeyapi (throwing of the ball)
7. Wanáǧi Yuhápi (soul keeping)

Each part of the čhaŋnúŋpa (stem, bowl, tobacco, breath, and smoke) is symbolic of the relationships of the natural world, the elements, humans and the spiritual beings that maintain the cycle of the universe.

== See also ==
- White Buffalo Cow Society
- Dignity (statue)
