= Wi (mythology) =

In Lakota mythology, Wi is one of the most powerful spirits. He is a solar spirit, and is associated with the American bison. He is the father of Wóȟpe. Anog Ite attempted to seduce Wi, but she had one of her two faces changed into an ugly visage as punishment.

His wife is the lunar goddess, Hanwi. As "Wi" refers to both him and his wife, he is referred as Anpetu Wi (Daytime Wi), while his wife is referred as Hanhepi Wi (Nighttime Wi) to differentiate the two deities.

== See also ==
- List of solar deities
