= Inyan =

In Lakota mythology, Íŋyaŋ (Rock) was the first of the powerful spirits. He existed before the beginning. He then created Maka and gave it the spirit Makȟá-akáŋl (Earth spirit), the second of the spirit beings and a part of Íŋyaŋ. After creating Makȟá, Íŋyaŋ was very weak. He created miniature versions of Makȟá, and her lover, father sky. Those miniatures were humans. This effort made Íŋyaŋ hard and powerless. His blood became the blue waters and the sky.
