= Wakinyan =

Lakota word for "thunder"

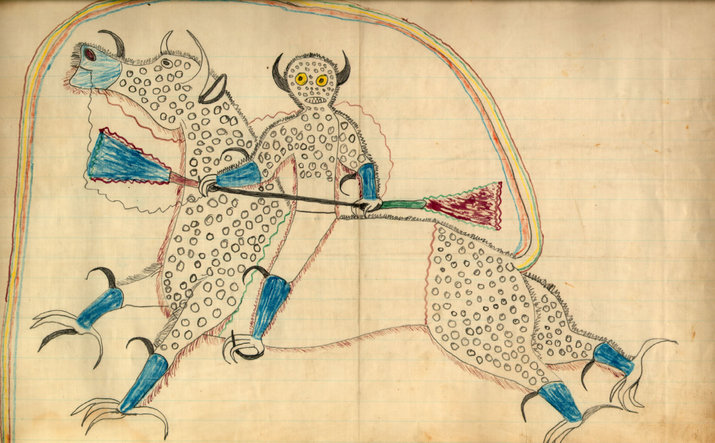
A dream of a Wakíŋyaŋ, drawing by Black Hawk (Sans Arc Lakota (ca. 1832–ca. 1890), Ledger art, ca.1880

Wakíŋyaŋ is a Lakota word for "thunder". It also may be a portmanteau which associates "wahka" ("sacred") and "kinyan" ("wings").

The word is often translated as "Thunder Spirits", "Thunder Beings," "Thunder Birds", or "Thunder Beasts". Heyokas, that is contrarians, dream of Wakinyan and can burn cedar (Juniperus scopulorum) to protect themselves from thunder and lightning, since Wakinyan respect trees and will not harm them.

Filmmaker and storm chaser Martin Lisius produced a short film in 2016 titled, "Wakíŋyaŋ" which honors the Lakota "thunder spirit" Wakíŋyaŋ.
