= Anishinaabe religions =

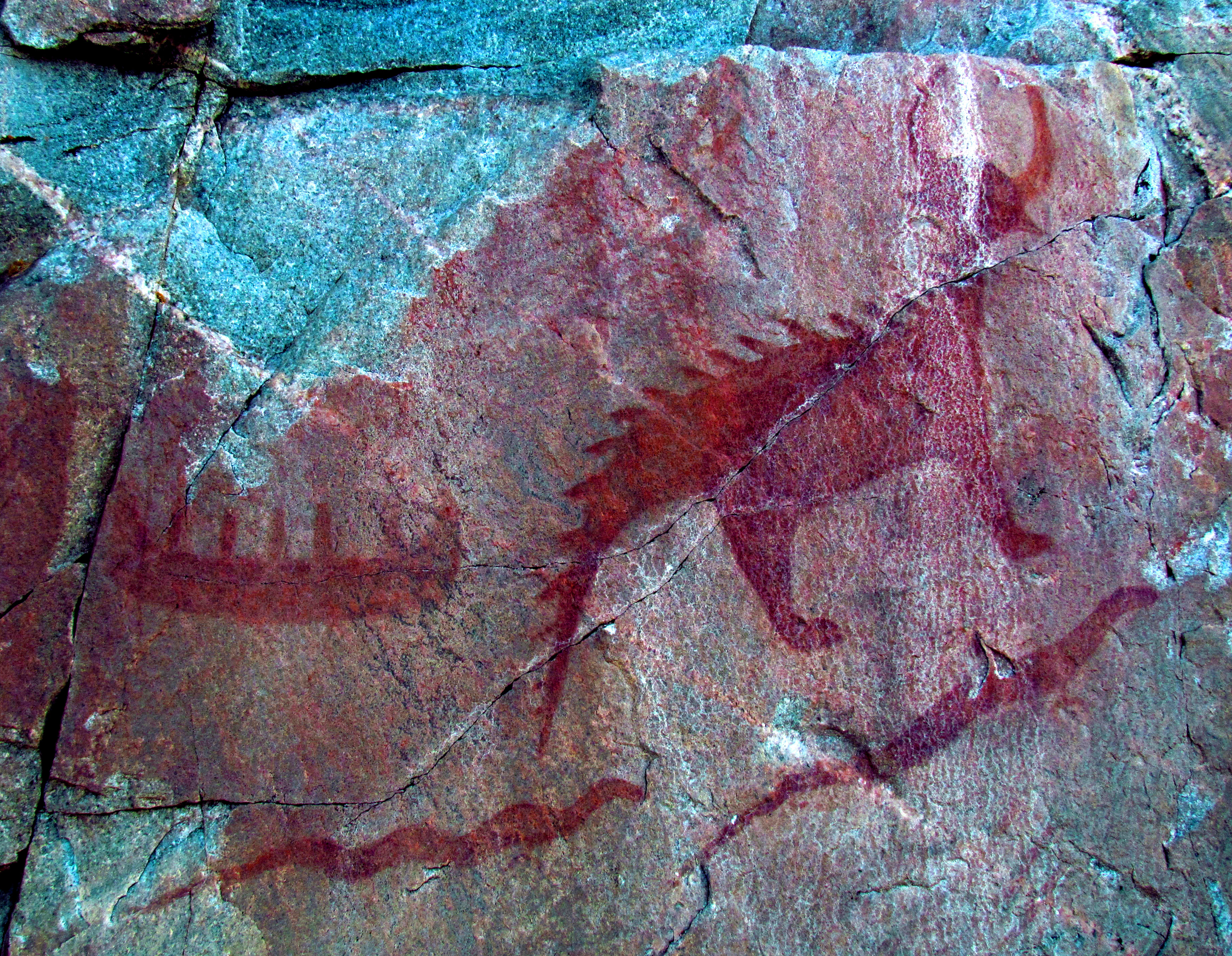
Pictographs of a mishibizhiw as well as two giant serpents and a canoe, from Lake Superior Provincial Park, Ontario, Canada. Attributed to the Ojibwe.

The term Anishinaabe is used as a collective noun by a group of different Algonquian-speaking peoples inhabiting parts of northeastern North America called the Anishinaabe. These peoples each have their own traditional Native American religions, although have also seen substantial conversion to Christianity.

Traditional religions found among the Anishinaabe peoples include Ojibwe religion, Odawa religion, Potawatomi religion, and Oji-Cree religion. Certain common features can be found across these different traditions and there are religious societies, like the Midewiwin, that have been practiced by members of different Anishinaabe groups.

== Migration story ==
According to the written (Wiigwaasabak) and oral history of the Anishinaabe, the origins of the migration was from shores of the "Great Salt Water". The migration was both spiritual and physical. According to numerous Anishinaabe scholars, the migration brought into the interior inland seas a spiritual governing system. They were instructed by seven prophets to follow a sacred miigis shell (whiteshell) toward the west, until they reached a place where food grew upon the water. Current Anishinaabe data suggests that the movement began much earlier—around 600 AD. They began their migration some time around 950.

Eventually, they settled in the lands of Northwestern Ontario, Minnesota and Wisconsin (wild rice being the food that grew upon the water) and made Mooningwanekaaning minis (Madeline Island: 'Island of the yellow-shafted flicker') their new capital. The Governing Council continued until they made conscious decision to dismantle and hide, as the reservation (reserve) systems would greatly alter Anishinaabe life ways. In total, the migration took around ten centuries.

== Importance of storytelling ==
Storytelling is one of the most important aspects of Anishinaabe life. Many Anishinaabe people believe that stories create worlds, are an essential part of generational connection by way of teaching and listening, and facilitate connection with the nonhuman, natural world. Oral storytelling is still used to pass down Anishinaabe traditional beliefs through generations.

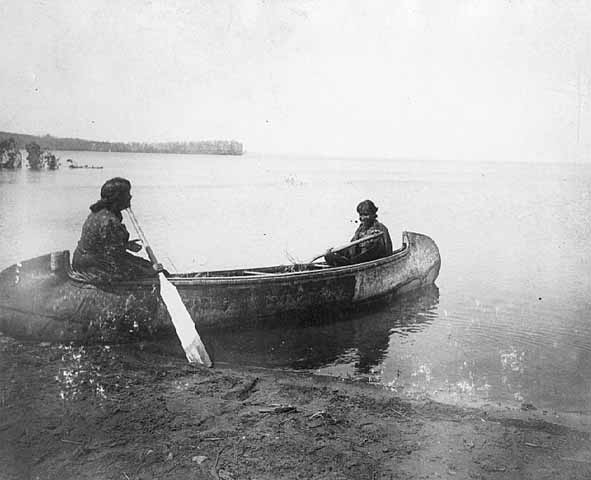
Ojibwawomen in a canoe at Leech Lake Minnesota in 1909

Storytelling is often used to teach life lessons relating to traditional and current beliefs. In Anishinaabe traditional stories, Nanabush, Amik (beaver), and Nokomis (grandmother figure) are important characters. Anishinaabe stories feature activities and actions involving generation, an important concept among Anishinaabe peoples such as participating in ceremonies, experimenting with new ideas and people, and reflecting on the outcome of events. Nanabush stories carry the message to young Indigenous peoples that it is okay to make mistakes, and that things are not always black and white.

Amik (beaver) is a being in traditional Anishinaabe stories that creates shared worlds. The stories of Amik’s creations and how Amik teaches their child about the world serves to provide a greater understanding of relationships and what is important in life. Nokomis (grandmother) is another being from Anishinaabe folklore. Nokomis and Nanabush stories are usually utilized to teach about important life lessons.

Generational storytelling creates a bond between tribal elders and younger Indigenous people. Elders are known as "knowledge keepers" and are highly respected for their knowledge about stories, language, and history.

== Relationships to the Other-Than-Human ==
In Anishinaabe traditional belief, everything in the environment is interconnected and has important relationships with the things around it. Non-humans, and ecosystems are viewed as having great worth and importance, in addition to humans. One such relationship in Anishinaabe homeland (what is now known as the Great Lake region) is between nmé (lake sturgeon), manoomin (wild rice), nibi (water), and humans. Similar relationships are exemplified in stories. For example, in her book A Short History of the Blockade, Leanne B. Simpson tells a story about Amik (beaver), stating "They [beavers] are consenting to giving up their bodies to help the Nishnaabeg feed their families."

These relationships between humans and the other-than-human can continue to be used in current times with regard to conservation and the environment. According to Potawatomi scholar Kyle Powys Whyte, "...indigenous conservationists and restorationists tend to focus on sustaining particular plants and animals whose lives are entangled locally—and often over many generations—in ecological, cultural and economic relationships with human societies and other nonhuman species."

== The Seven Grandfather Teachings ==
The Seven Grandfather Teachings are traditional guiding principles for living a good life still in use by Anishnaabe peoples today. (They originate from the Potowatomi and Ojibwe tribes specifically.) These teachings include wisdom, respect, love, honesty, humility, bravery, and truth, and are supposed to be practiced towards humans, the earth, and everything in the environment. According to Leanne B. Simpson in A Short History of the Blockade, the Seven Grandfather Teachings were "...gifted to the Nishnaabeg by Seven Ancestors, a group of loving Elders and advisors that taught a young child these practices as recorded in one of our Sacred Stories." Each of the teachings has an animal that represents it.

== See also ==
- Mythologies of the indigenous peoples of North America
- Abenaki mythology
- Blackfoot mythology
- Indigenous astronomy in the lands claimed by Canada
- Lenape mythology
