= Ojibwe religion =

Traditional Native American religion

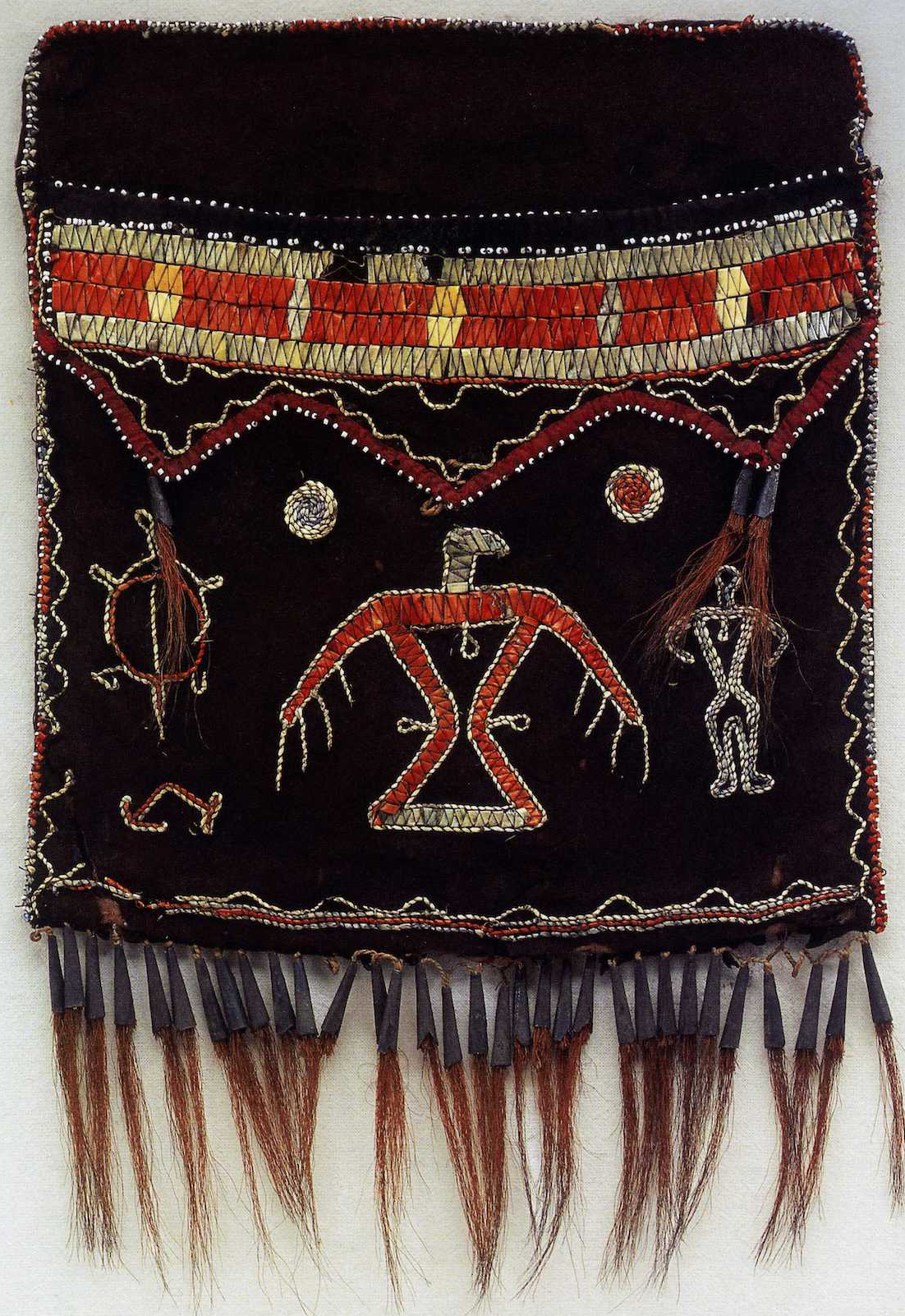
An Ojibwe shoulder bag, produced c. 1820, depicting an animiki (thunderbird), one of the central figures of Ojibwe theology

Ojibwe religion is the traditional Native American religion of the Ojibwe people. Found primarily in north-eastern North America, it is practiced within Ojibwe communities in Canada and the United States. The tradition has no formal leadership or organizational structure and displays much internal variation.

Central to Ojibwe religion are powerful spirit beings called the manitouk. These come in various forms, each of which has a different relationship to humanity. Among the most prominent are the animikeek or thunderbirds, who bring storms and are generally helpful to humans, and the Mishebeshu, underwater and underground serpents whose activities are often harmful. In Ojibwe religion, a successful life is one that has secured the support of powerful manitouk, often through the provision of offerings like tobacco. Ojibwe religious practitioners undergo vision quests as a means of establishing a relationship with a particular manitou that becomes their guiding patron; prior to the 20th century, almost every Ojibwe male undertook this vision quest when they reached puberty. Ritual specialists, deemed to possess powers from the manitouk, are responsible for healing, locating game, and other tasks. The most common of these specialists is the Jiisakiiwinini, whose Jiisakiiwin or shaking tent ritual typically invokes spirits for healing.

One of the Algonquian-speaking peoples, the Ojibwe originally lived a hunter-gatherer lifestyle. In that context, relationships with manitouk were deemed crucial for securing food supplies. Early contacts with Christian Europeans came in the 17th century, when several Roman Catholic missions were established among Ojibwe communities. By at least the 18th century, southern Ojibwe had formed a religious organisation centring around healing, the Midewiwin. The 19th century saw the arrival of Protestant missions and the ultimate restriction of many Ojibwe people to reservations. Here, the Ojibwe were exposed more heavily to Christianity and many elements of Ojibwe religion, such as the puberty vision quests, declined substantially. Encouraged by the American Indian Movement, the 1960s and 1970s saw revitalisation efforts to revive Ojibwe traditional religion. In the late 20th century, Ojibwe practices were increasingly influenced by other Native American religions, especially those of the Lakota.

Many Ojibwe practice their traditional religion alongside Christianity, typically Catholicism. For these individuals, the creator being Kitche Manitou is often identified with the Christian God, although other Christians have expressed hostility towards Ojibwe religious traditions.

== Definition and classification ==
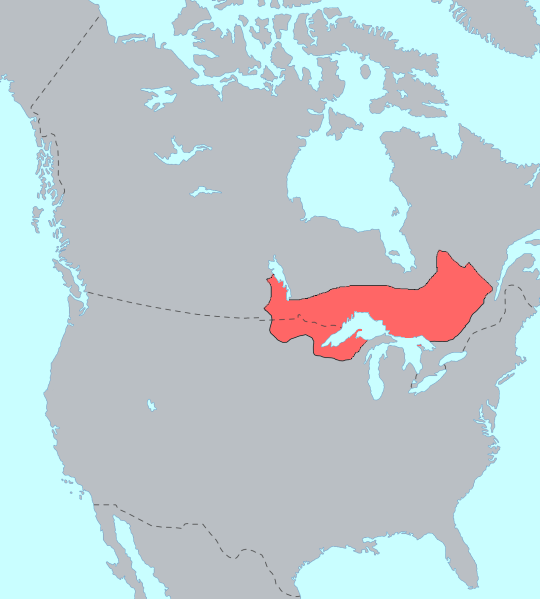
Map highlighting the distribution of Ojibwe people at the time of European contact

The Ojibwe are an Algonquian-speaking people. They live principally in the Great Lakes region of North America—specifically in Minnesota, Michigan, Wisconsin, and Ontario—and in parts of Manitoba and Saskatchewan. Together with the Odawa (Ottawa) and Potawatomi nations, the Ojibwe form a confederation called the Three Fires.

The term Ojibwe was adopted as a collective noun in the 19th century. It probably derives from the Algonquian word ojib ('puckered up'), often interpreted as a reference to the puckered seam on the moccasin shoes traditionally worn by Ojibwe people. The alternative spelling Ochipwe has also resulted in the Ojibwe sometimes being called the Chippewa, especially in the United States. Many Ojibwe refer to themselves as the Anishnaabeg, although this term usually also encompasses all Algonquian-speaking peoples, and some members of the former group prefer Ojibwe over Anishnaabeg.

=== Classifying Ojibwe religion ===
Ojibwe religion has been described as an aboriginal religion. As Ojibwe culture is traditionally orally transmitted, the religion has no textual canon. It has no dogma, and no articles of faith, and there is therefore variation in its belief and practice. Many of its rituals have changed over time, with adherents open to adapting their beliefs and practices in accordance with dreams and visions. Native American religions more broadly have always adapted in response to environmental changes and interactions with other communities. The Ojibwe have absorbed influences both from other Native American groups and from European Americans, with their religious outlook being influenced by Christianity. Ojibwe religion thus no longer exists in the form practiced by the Ojibwe when they were a hunter-gatherer society prior to European contact.

Ojibwe people generally tend to a holistic view of religion. As with Native Americans generally, religion is a fully integrated facet of life and culture within Ojibwe communities. Many Ojibwe prefer to describe their traditional beliefs and practices as "our way" or "our way of life" rather than as a "religion." In the Ojibwe language, there are no indigenous words synonymous with the English language term religion. Two Ojibwe terms have sometimes been used in a roughly similar manner; namhwin or anamiewin denotes something like "prayer" and is used to describe Christian religion, while mnidooked, meaning to venerate the mnidoog or manitouk, is used to describe an attitude and action associated with traditional Ojibwe religion.

Ojibwe traditional worldviews closely resemble those of other Algonquian-speaking peoples. The Ojibwe's religion is particularly similar to that of the Odawa people, although they also share many religious and cultural elements with groups like the Potawatomi, Menominee, and Cree. Many Ojibwe combine traditional religious activities with involvement in Christianity, usually Catholicism, equating the Christian God with the traditional Ojibwe creator being Kitche Manitou. In some cases they have adopted Christian beliefs and figures and inserted them into the traditional Ojibwe cosmology. Other Ojibwe remain committed to just one of the two religions.

== Beliefs ==
=== Theology and the manitouk ===
In private, hunters and fishermen sought the patronage and the pardon of the manitous (mysteries) who presided over the animals and the birds; and medicine men and women invoked the mysteries to confer curative powers upon the herbs that were used in their preparations. In public, the people conducted rituals and ceremonies to foster upright living; petitioned Kitche Manitou and the deities for blessing; or offered thanksgiving for game and abundant harvest.

— Ojibwe writer and linguist Basil Johnston

Ojibwe religion is polytheistic. It maintains that human existence relies on maintaining relations with powerful beings, the manitouk or manidoog (singular manitou or manidoo). (Note: Some sources, like Hultkrantz, have suggested that manitouk constitutes an impersonal force or energy equivalent to the Lakota wakan. Hallowell disagreed, stating that "there is no evidence to suggest[...] that the term ever did connote an impersonal, magical or supernatural force".) These have been described as "spirits", or "spiritual beings", while the scholar of religion Theresa S. Smith called them "the power beings of the Ojibwe cosmos". Such entities are not considered fundamentally different from humanity; the Ojibwe do not traditionally draw a dichotomy between the natural and supernatural.

The most powerful of these manitouk are the four winds, the underwater serpents, the thunderbirds, the owners of various animal species, the windigo, and Nanabush. Beyond these, there are a wider range of less powerful manitouk. Manitouk act according to their own needs and desires; although their motivations are similar to those of humans, they possess far greater power. Ojibwe may interpret events in the world around them as caused through the actions of manitouk. Human relationships with the manitouk vary, with some being viewed with affection and others with dread. Some manitouk can harm humans, and those deemed particularly dangerous, such as Mishebeshu or the windigo, are termed matchi-manitou (evil manitou).

Like the traditionally hunter-gatherer Ojibwe, the manitouk are deemed nomadic, sometimes moving according to prescribed paths or the seasons, at other times in an unexpected manner. An example of a manitou moving in a prescribed pattern is Ningobianong, the evening star. They are also regarded as lacking a single form, instead possessing metamorphic abilities. In art, they are often represented in symbolic and abstracted ways. These depictions can be found on objects like woven bags and drums, on pictographs painted onto rocks, or alternatively on the birchbark scrolls used by the Midewiwin society.

==== Human relations with the manitouk ====
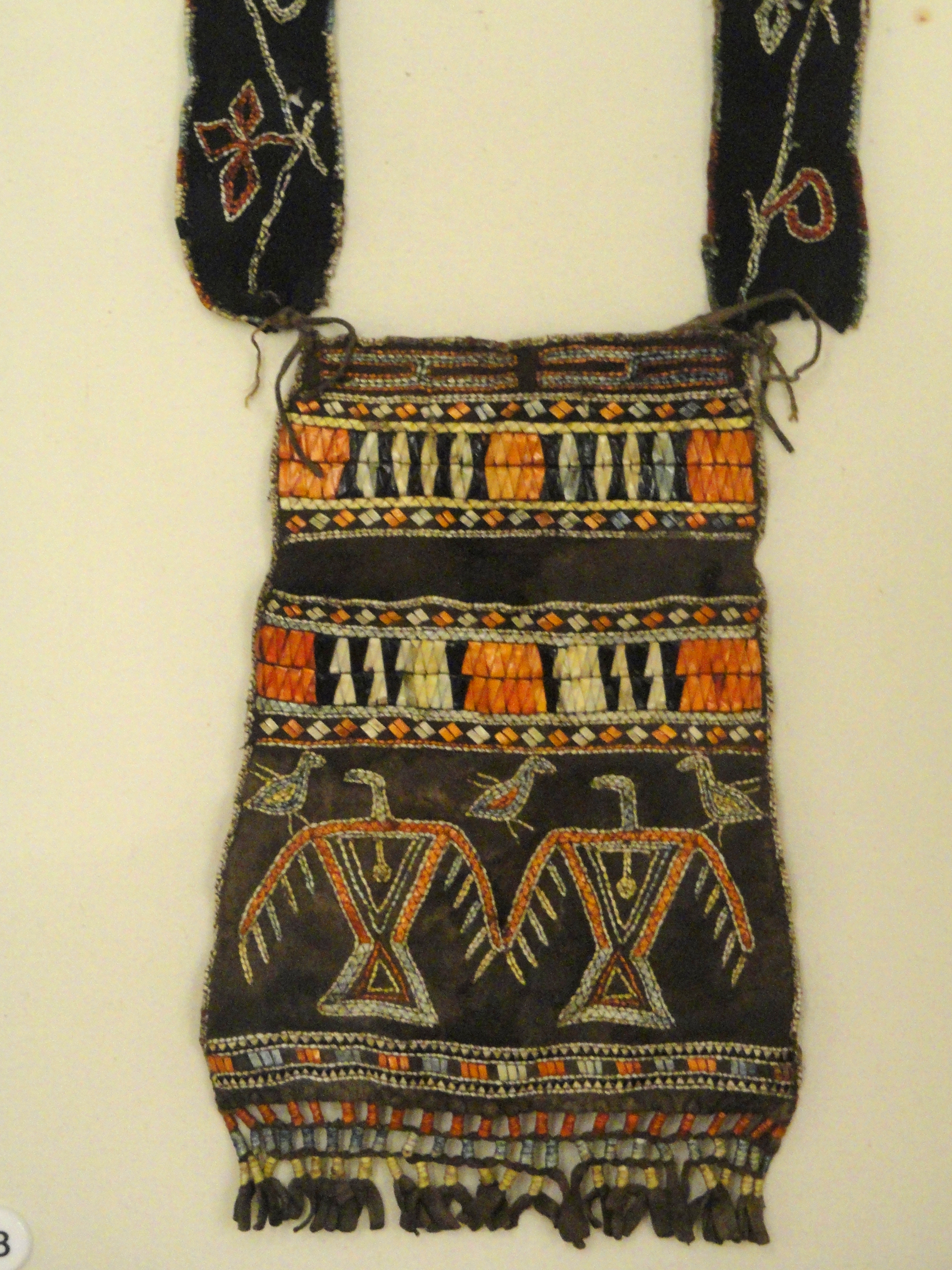
Two thunderbirds, powerful manitouk in the Ojibwe religion, on a quillwork shoulder pouch; displayed at the Peabody Museum Harvard

Humans can build a personal relationship with a particular manitou, one that becomes their guardian for life. This was historically facilitated by the vision quest which Ojibwe youth were expected to undergo around puberty. Some Ojibwe have had an image of this guardian tattooed on their body. Anyone falsely claiming the patronage of a particular manitou is thought to face severe, violent retribution from said being.

Manitouk can assist humans by providing them with success in hunting, in war, or in overcoming sorcery. One of the key means of interacting with the manitouk is ritual, and, as with other neighboring tribes, emphasis is placed on appearing pitiable before these spirits. Ojibwe tradition teaches that the manitouk can communicate with humans through dreams and visions, the latter thus considered of great importance among Ojibwe people. Via dreams, manitouk can bestow gifts of healing or power, historically often a skill in hunting. For this reason, manitouk are also referred to as pawaganak (dream visitors), especially among northern Ojibwe. If a person encounters an unwanted manitou in a dream, they will sometimes scrape their tongue with a cedar knife.

==== Kitche Manitou ====
No one manitou is believed to rule supreme over the others. Although it is deemed largely uninvolved in human affairs, Ojibwe theology includes a creator being, Kitche Manitou (Gichi-Manidoo), its name meaning "great manitou". Often referred to as the "Master of Life," the figure is not traditionally gendered. It is symbolised by the sun, with the sky described as its hand. Kitche Manitou is believed to send messages to the Ojibwe through eagles, whose appearance may be interpreted accordingly.

Since Christianity's introduction, many Ojibwe have equated Kitche Manitou with the Christian God. The historian Christopher Vecsey suggested that the name Kitche Manitou may have been coined by Christians and, highlighting the lack of references to this figure in early sources, suggests that this notion of a supreme Ojibwe creator deity was a Christian innovation. Conversely, John Cooper argued for the existence of such a creator divinity among northern Algonquian peoples prior to European contact, and by the late 20th century many Ojibwe believed that Kitche Manitou had been part of their pre-contact aboriginal traditions.

==== Nanabush and the Four Winds ====
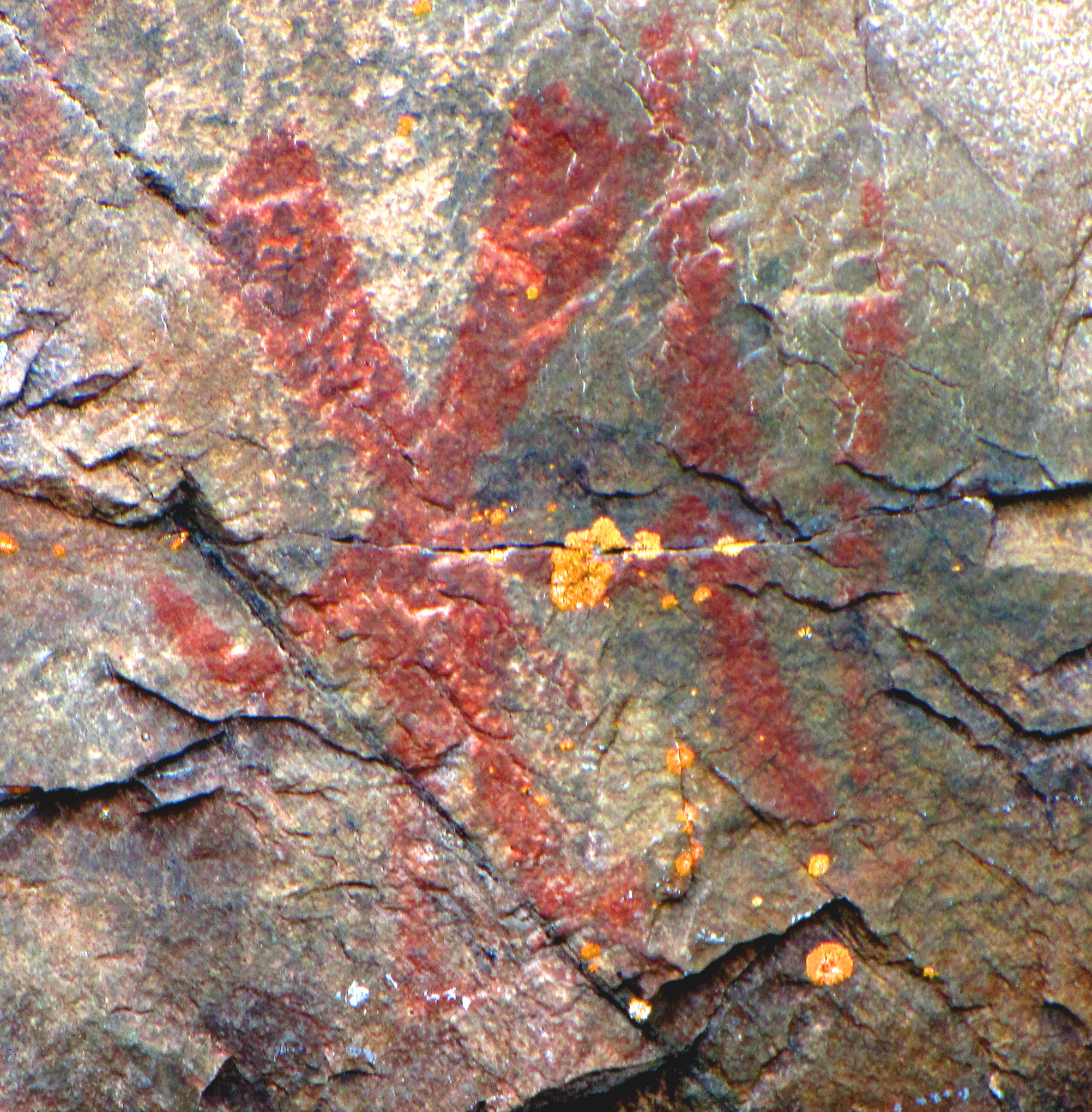
A pictograph of Nanabush on Mazinaw Rock at Bon Echo Provincial Park, Ontario

Nanabush is the culture hero of the Ojibwe, in some stories appearing as the messenger of Kitche Manitou. A figure prominent in the cosmologies of various Algonquian-speaking peoples, his name exists in various forms across the Ojibwe, including Nanabozho, Nanapus, and Menabojes, while he is also called the Great Rabbit or Great White Hare. He is often presented as the son of a human mother and a manitou father, the latter often identified as the West or North Wind.

In Ojibwe lore, Nanabush taught humans to hunt and fish, discovered wild rice, and invented snow shoes. At the same time he was a trickster, one capable of being greedy or cruel. Although an important figure in Ojibwe mythology, historically Nanabush rarely served as a personal guardian and was not often given offerings. According to one belief, Nanabush traveled west to escape the arrival of European settlers, with some Ojibwe claiming that he now forms the Sleeping Giant rock formation in Thunder Bay harbor.

The four winds are manitouk that live in the four corners of the world, and are named Waubun, Zeegwun, Ningobianong, and Bebon. They are sometimes perceived as four separate entities, and at other times as part of the same being. According to Ojibwe mythology, they were placed in the cardinal directions by Nanabush. They also bear seasonal associations, with Bebon linked to winter and Zeegwun to summer. Ojibwe have historically sought to influence the four winds to act to their advantage, for instance by preventing them from blowing too harshly in summer, thus allowing Ojibwe to fish safely on the lakes, or by encouraging a harsh north wind in winter, thus hardening the crust of the snow to make it easier to hunt deer.

==== Animikeek ====
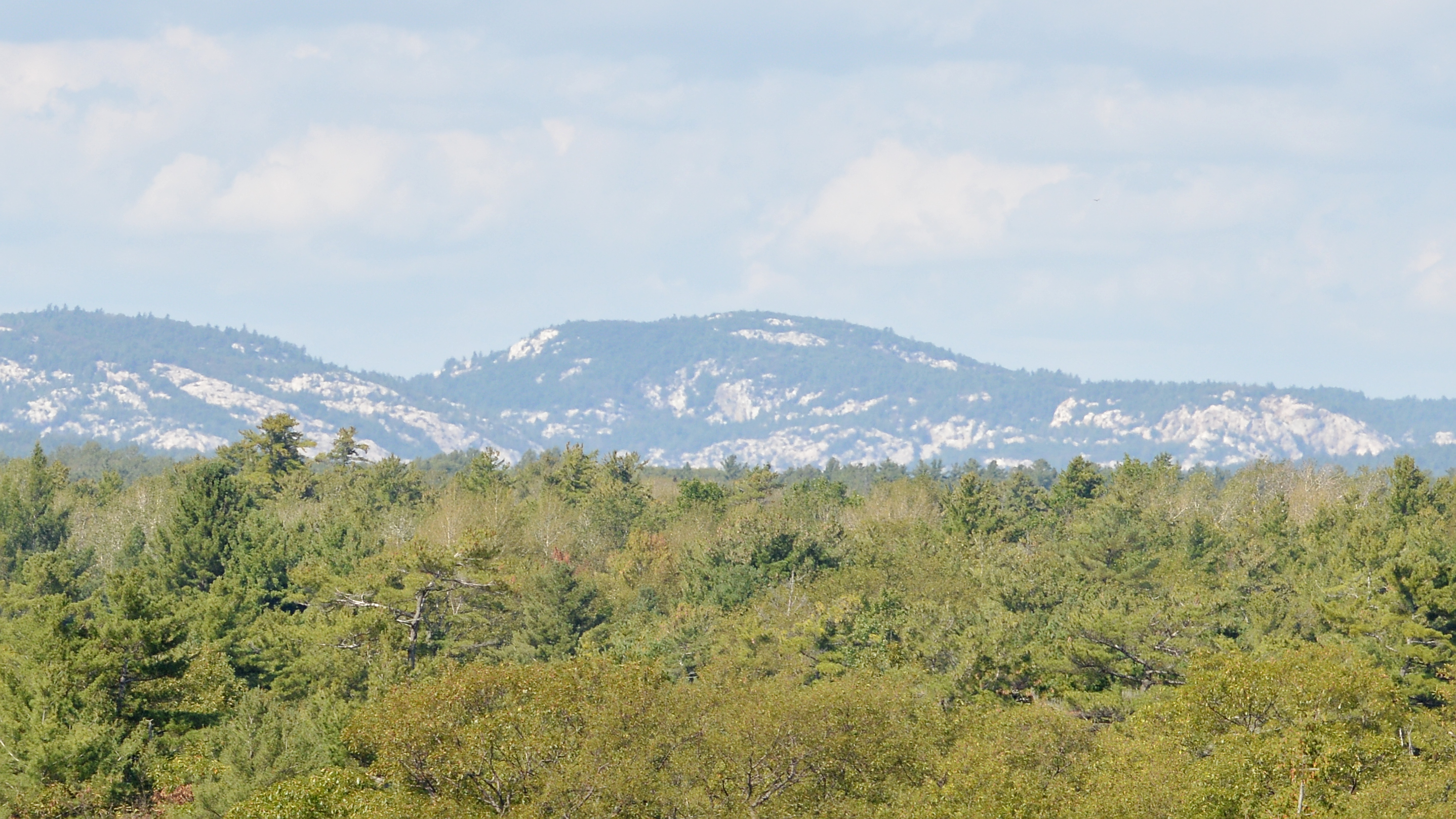
In Ojibwe lore, the La Cloche Mountains are among the places where the animikeek nest

One of the most prominent group of manitouk are the animikeek (singular animiki), the thunderbirds or thunderers. Among northern Ojibwe, as well as among Cree people, they are also sometimes called pinesiwak ('birds'). Thunderbird beliefs are not unique to the Ojibwe and are found among many Native American groups. They resemble eagles, although can also take on human form, sometimes with wings, and exhibit human-like social organisation. The animikeek live in family groups, with young thunderers sometimes behaving in an unruly and destructive way with their lightning.

Ojibwe tradition holds that the arrival of the animikeek is signalled by thunderstorms, a phenomenon common across the northern Great Lakes from late spring through to winter. Thunder is seen as a form of communication from the animikeek, one that is sometimes intelligible to humans. Some Ojibwe relate that they can differentiate the various individual thunderers by the sounds that they make. Thunderbirds are generally regarded as coming from the west, although among northern Ojibwe groups they are instead said to come from the south. The animikeek are deemed to live in nests atop mountains, including the La Cloche Mountains and Mount McKay near Thunder Bay, with various Ojibwe claiming to have seen these nests, made from large stones arranged as shallow bowls.

According to Ojibwe tradition, the animikeek fly across the sky to hunt the underground or underwater serpent manitouk, whom they then devour. The animikeek hurl lightning bolts down to kill these serpents. They are also thought to cast small spherical thunderstones to the ground, which then offer people protection from storms; if a tree has been struck by lightning, Ojibwe may search the base of it for such stones. Ojibwe often show respect to the animikeek by calling them grandfathers; they will often give offerings to them when hunting fowl, and invoke their protective properties by artistically depicting them on many objects. Christian Ojibwe often equate the animikeek with the Holy Spirit, using these thunderbirds' image in place of that of the dove, which in Christian iconography traditionally denotes this form of God.

==== Mishebeshu ====
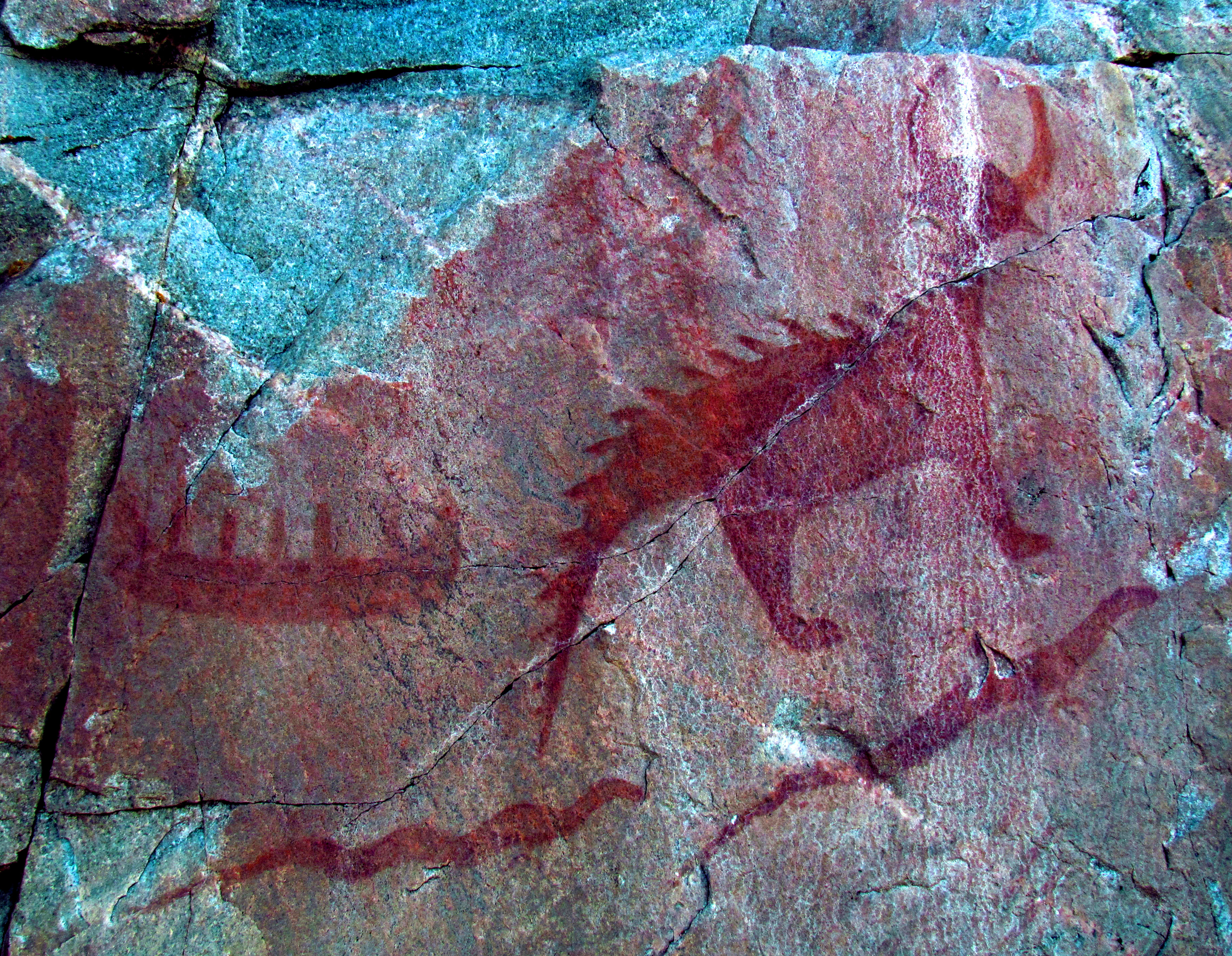
A pictograph of Mishebeshu, alongside a canoe and two serpents, painted on Agawa Rock along Lake Superior prior to 1850. This is considered the best-known portrayal of Mishebeshu.

Another prominent manitouk is Mishebeshu, a term that denotes both a singular being and a plural term for his manifestations and associates. Although the name Mishebeshu literally means "Great Lynx", the entity is typically portrayed not as a cat but as a monstrous serpent, usually with horns, thought to dwell primarily in water. Vecsey suggested that at some point in prehistory, these may have been two separate entities, later conflated into one.

According to one Ojibwe story, all snakes come from Mishebeshu, being created when he was struck by lightning long ago. There is unending strife between the animikeek and Mishebeshu; although the former hunt and eat the underwater serpents, there are also accounts of the Mishebeshu proving victorious in these clashes. Mishebeshu is also regarded as being in control of copper, a metal with high cultural value for Ojibwe communities. Specifically, copper is believed to come from Mishebeshu's body, especially his horns, and areas where copper ore naturally occurs are often deemed of great importance.

The Ojibwe traditionally fear Mishebeshu, displaying an attitude different from the caution and respect accorded the animikeek. Mishebeshu are dangerous, although not evil; they are responsible for causing stormy waters and thus pulling people to their deaths in rivers and lakes, for turning the ground to quicksand or swamp beneath people's feet, and for stealing infants. According to lore, Mishebeshu can travel between different lakes via a network of subterranean tunnels. Many Ojibwe have avoided going near certain lakes, especially in summer. When they do need to cross the water, for instance to fish, they will often propitiate him. Offerings to him are principally of tobacco, although historically he was also offered copper and sacrificed dogs.

Stories involving the manitouk were historically only told in winter, when the waters were frozen. This was because it was feared that discussing Mishebeshu would encourage them to emerge, which could prove dangerous to the storyteller. For this reason, Ojibwe often avoid saying aloud Mishebeshu's name, instead referring to him with descriptions like "that monster" or "the big snake". Dreaming of Mishebeshu is sometimes considered a bad omen, and there are 19th-century records of some Ojibwe building their beds in trees to avoid dreaming of the underground Mishebeshu. Despite the threat Mishebeshu posed, he could act as a person's guardian and provide them with medicine, although only the most powerful or daring Ojibwe healers turn to him.

==== Other manitouk ====
Various manitouk serve as the masters of different natural entities and species. The owner manitouk of large mammals that the Ojibwe traditionally hunted, such as bear and deer, have been an important part of Ojibwe religion; propitiating these entities was necessary to ensure hunting success. Other manitouk were the owners of particular locations, such as pools and waterfalls. There are other lesser manitouk. The Paagak or Pahkack is a flying skeleton, while the Memegwesiwag (Maymaygwayshug) are hairy dwarf manitouk living among rocks or in the cliffs along riverbanks.

Windigo are anthropomorphic cannibals who eat humans; they were once human themselves, but transformed after eating their family. The windigo is sometimes deemed to possess human beings, something other manitouk rarely do. In Ojibwe lore, a person can become a windigo if they are gluttonous, if they are cursed by a witch, or if they receive a windigo as their personal guardian. Ojibwe often believe it necessary to kill windigos and there are various recorded accounts of people battling them or killing individuals suspected of transforming into one. Algonquian peoples like the Ojibwe regard cannibals as a particular danger because they are obsessed with consuming without regard to kinship or thanksgiving.

=== Mythology, cosmogony, and cosmology ===
Ojibwe mythology is passed down orally. It displays similar motifs and themes to the stories of other Algonquian peoples, although also has distinctive traits, like a particular focus on hunting. These myths can be flexible and adapt to changing situations; they have absorbed influences from other Native groups and from Christians, changed through the aesthetic preferences of storytellers, and been informed by people's personal visions. Ojibwe traditionally drew a distinction between ordinary stories about living humans and sacred stories about the manitouk. In the Severn River area these were referred to as tipacimowinak ('stories') and kanatipacimowinak ('sacred stories') respectively, although among the southeast Ojibwe they have instead been referred to as dbaajmowin ('story') and aadsookaan ('sacred story'). Mythical narratives were sometimes recorded on pictographs, serving as mnemonic devices to help people recall them.

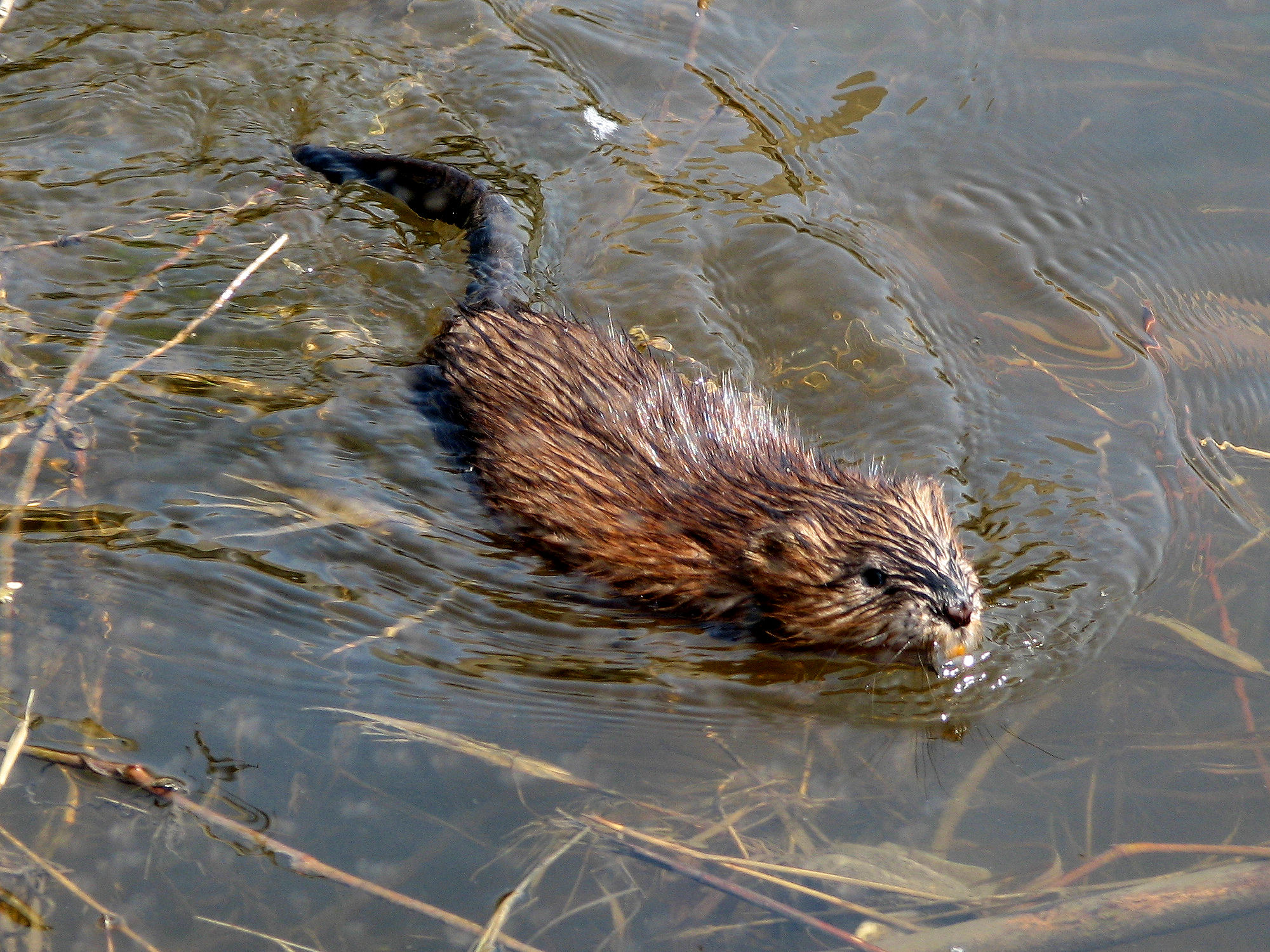
According to a common Ojibwe cosmogony myth, the world of humans is made from soil collected by a muskrat (pictured) during a great deluge

The traditional Ojibwe cosmogony is a version of the Earth diver narrative. Among the Ojibwe, this cosmogonical story exists in various different forms although with some common features. These stories typically maintain that there were once the Aadizookaanag ('original people') who went naked and did nothing; Kitche Manitou then sent them a messenger to teach them various things. In some versions this messenger is Nanabush, although in other variants he arrived later. Nanabush then went hunting with the wolves, one of whom was his grandson, Chibiabos. After water serpent manitouk killed Chibiabos, Nanabush slaughtered the head serpent. They pursued him, seeking vengeance, and so he climbed atop a tall tree on a mountain. They flooded the Earth to reach him; Nanabush then sent a muskrat to dive to the bottom, collecting soil, from which Nanabush formed a new Earth. Some modern Ojibwe regard this cosmogony as a literal account of history; they reject archaeological and genetic evidence indicating that Native Americans descend from prehistoric Asian migrants.

In accordance with this myth, traditional Ojibwe cosmology maintains that the world of humans is an island surrounded by water. Ojibwe cosmology also includes belief in a multilevel cosmos with different layers ruled by different manitouk. The hierarchy of these layers nevertheless varies among different Ojibwe. Above humanity's realm is that of the thunderbirds. Beneath the Earth is an underworld where the dead ultimately go. In some accounts, the underworld or a certain layer of it are the reverse of the Earth. This cosmology is marked by the four directions which are the abodes of the winds and the animikeek. Each quarter has its own colour: east is yellow, south is red, west is black, and north is white. The directions, and especially the four cardinal points, are highly meaningful in Ojibwe cosmology.

=== Animism and other-than-human-persons ===
The scholar of religion Graham Harvey described the traditional Ojibwe worldview as "pervasively social," one in which the world was deemed "a community of persons (not all of whom are human)." In traditional Ojibwe cosmology, animals, plants, some stones, certain locations, clouds, the sun, moon, and stars can all be thought of as animate "persons." They are all perceived as having intelligence, knowledge, wisdom, and the ability to speak, with the traditional Ojibwe worldview emphasising the similarity, rather than the dissimilarity, of all beings. Drawing on his research among the northern Ojibwe, the anthropologist Alfred Irving Hallowell termed these "other-than-human persons." Harvey described this approach as animism, by which he meant "efforts to live well in a world which is a community of persons, most of whom are 'other-than-human'."

In Ojibwe religion, humans are regarded as being equal to these other-than-human persons, rather than being innately superior. They are thus not viewed as having a privileged or unique status in the world. Ojibwe religion typically perceives a sense of kinship between all living things, with all persons being viewed as kin; Ojibwe people sometimes refer to other-than-human persons as relatives with terms like "brother", "grandfather", and "grandmother". As such, Ojibwe religion emphasises that practitioners should maintain proper relationships with the universe and all persons within it.

This attitude of respect impacts Ojibwe interactions with the world. When hunting, Ojibwe are expected to treat their prey in a specific manner; those slain are subject to a conciliatory mourning ceremony, with the hunters apologising to the animal, offering it tobacco, and referring to it with terms implying a family relationship. When the meat is being cut up, parts are offered to the manitou that owns that species. When bears were traditionally hunted in the spring, Ojibwe hunters would ask them to leave their dens and offer an apology for killing them; the skull of the slain bear would then be decorated. Ojibwe lore maintained that game animals had to be treated well, so that when their spirits met the manitou that owned that species they would recommend that their killers could take other animals in future. Cruelty to animals would bring retaliation from that species' manitou owner.

=== Metamorphoses, soul, and afterlife ===
There is variation in Ojibwe belief regarding human identity. Ojibwe tradition maintains that the soul or life force is vital to defining a living thing; its outer appearance is incidental. In Ojibwe tradition, both certain humans and manitouk can change their outward appearance, with metamorphoses a recurring theme in traditional Ojibwe narratives. This contributes to an Ojibwe mistrust of strangers, as the latter are regarded as potentially not being what they appear to be; an animal that is encountered may be a disguised human.

Like many other Native American groups, the Ojibwe traditionally believed that a human has multiple souls. One of these is based in the heart and is responsible for animating the body and for providing a person with their intelligence, memory, and consciousness. The other soul is capable of separating from the body and going traveling, especially during sleep. This traveling soul helps to guide the person, for instance when hunting. Among northern Ojibwe, this traveling soul was called the òtcatcákwin.

In traditional belief, upon bodily death a person's first soul goes straight to the afterlife, but their traveling soul becomes a ghost and remains near the grave for a while before proceeding to the afterlife. This afterlife realm is generally believed to exist to the south or west, situated either on a level or above the realm of humans; it was not an underworld. According to tradition, it is ruled over by Nanabush or by his wolf brother. Non-human persons would also go to that afterworld following bodily death. To get to it, the spirit must cross a river on the back of a snake. If the spirit falls into the water, it is destroyed forever or transformed into a fish or toad.

In the afterlife, spirits dance and thus produce the northern lights. Knowledge of this afterlife has been attributed to ghosts who communicate with the living or from people, often those comatose or seriously ill, who ventured to the afterlife but returned. Spirits of the deceased will rarely have the power of manitouk. Some Ojibwe believe that spirits of the deceased may appear to them in animal form; ghosts might appear as owls.

In the 1980s, Christopher Vecsey noted that most Ojibwe had adopted the Christian belief in a single, unitary soul. He also observed that many Ojibwe, including those who were not Christians, had adopted a Christian-derived idea that there were separate afterlives for those who had been good and bad during their lives. Traditionally, Ojibwe traditional belief was that humans would be rewarded or punished for their actions in their current life, rather than in an afterlife.

=== Morality and gender roles ===
Key to traditional Ojibwe life is the attempt to live well, or bimaadiziwin. Hallowell described this as denoting "life in the fullest sense, life in the sense of longevity, health and freedom from misfortune". To ensure this, a person must build respectful and reciprocal relationships with powerful manitouk. Dealing with life's hardships quietly and with equanimity is deemed admirable, while complaining or whining is frowned upon. Sharing is an important value, while hoarding is discouraged; traditionally, sharing food with anyone hungry, including strangers, is important, with Ojibwe expecting the manitouk to show them similar generosity. Traditionally, the Ojibwe worldview does not follow the Christian binary division between good and evil. Instead, Smith noted, it sees things in terms of "balance and imbalance, control and chaos".

A person's bad behavior, referred to as madjiijiwe baziwin, can result in them being punished with misfortune or illness. Madjiijiwe baziwin can include being greedy and refusing to share, displaying excess pride, misusing one's power, murder, mistreating animals or plants, disrespecting or neglecting the manitouk, or displaying cruelty or sexual perversion. A person seeking to accumulate too much power from the manitouk is deemed to endanger both themselves and their family. Ojibwe lore maintains that youths who fast excessively to accumulate visions have lost their sense of communal obligations and so have become murderers, outcasts, or have been transformed into robins. Historically, revenge was a key means of keeping intra-and inter-community harmony, reflecting the myths of how Nanabush established social balance by seeking revenge for the deaths of his family members. To prevent revenge killings, a killer might give gifts to the person slain, so as to placate their spirit.

Menstruating women are regarded as possessing an uncontrollable and dangerous power. While menstruating, they are prohibited from dancing at powwows, from approaching men involved in hunting, or from stepping over animals, especially those being prepared as food. Prior to European colonisation, the Ojibwe observed clear gendered divisions of labor, with men as hunters and women as the gatherers and preparers of food. Historically, men who were leaders in their bands could take multiple wives, thus displaying that they were able to support several women due to the favor of the manitouk. Historically, certain Ojibwe men adopted the clothes and social roles of women based on visions experienced during puberty. Elders are accorded status, prestige, and power in Ojibwe communities. A person comes to be regarded as an elder not necessarily by age, but because they are perceived as living right and displaying wisdom.

== Practices ==
Ojibwe rituals, whether individual or communal, facilitate relations with the manitouk. Ceremonial aspects can be found in many elements of Ojibwe life, with certain elements — including the sweat bath, prayers, songs, offerings, the use of ritual paraphernalia, and the observance of taboos — being common. Vecsey noted that Ojibwe rituals have historically been concerned with hunting and food gathering and that they lacked "the ornate, formalised pomp" found among many agricultural Native American communities.

=== Prayer and offerings ===
Prayers are intended to influence the manitouk, and often petition them for assistance in times of need, for instance when people require food or healing. These may be directed to a particular manitou based on the situation, for instance being directed to Nanabush while hunting or to Mishebeshu when crossing water. There is no set formulas for prayers, which usually involve only a few words, sometimes accompanied with offerings.

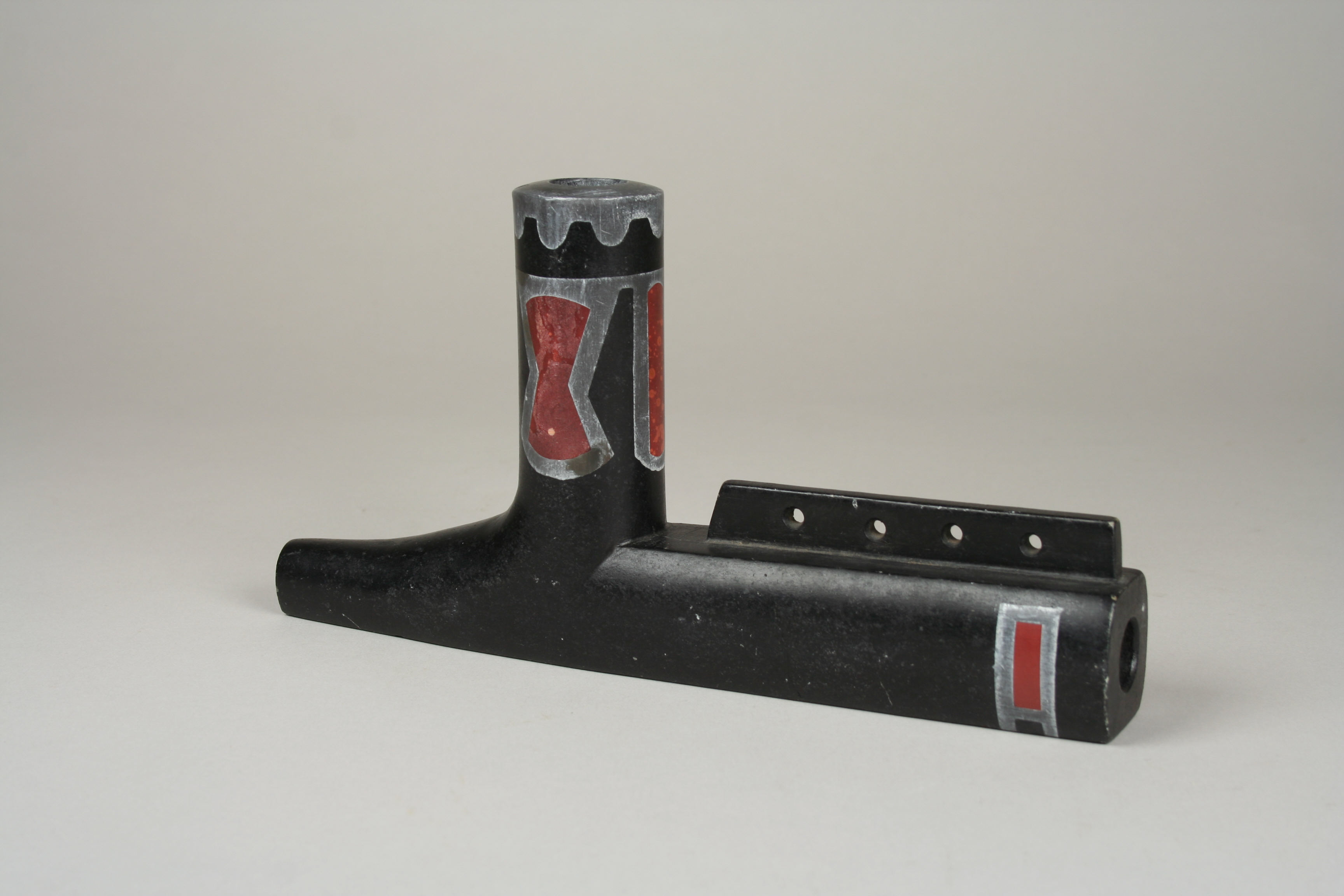
An Ojibwe pipe bowl and stem, made circa 1885

Dog sacrifice has historically been part of Ojibwe religion, either practiced alone or as part of a larger ceremony. One belief recorded among the Ojibwe is that dogs were specially created for sacrifice. More commonly gifted as an offering is tobacco; it is considered suitable as a gift, either as an expression of thanks or of supplication, for manitouk or human elders. It might be given as an offering to calm stormy waters, to placate animals that a hunter has slain, or as an offering to the earth when cutting herbs. In some cases it is simply placed on the ground or into water, at other times will be smoked in a pipe or burned in a fire. The method of disposal may reflect the identity of the manitouk it is directed towards; burning tobacco will help it reach the animikeek in the sky, while placing it on the ground will make it accessible to Mishebeshu.

Ojibwe people may burn tobacco during a thunderstorm, usually in front of a wood stove, atop an oven or in a smudge pot, both to thank the animikeek for the rain and to supplicate them in the hope that it will prevent lightning from striking the home. They may also bury tobacco outside their homes to propitiate these thunderers. Pipe ceremonies include offerings to the four directions. These take place before various events, including meetings, powwows, and weddings. Tobacco was also smoked during trade and political negotiations to solicit the aid of the manitouk at those times.

Tobacco is considered a sacred plant alongside cedar, sage, and sweetgrass. Cedar and sweetgrass are deemed to have purifying properties. Ojibwe people often tie sweetgrass around their settlements, for instance onto medicine wheels or onto the rearview mirrors of their cars. Sage is used for prayer, but also burned for purification or tied into bundles and given as offerings. When collecting sage, Ojibwe will often request permission to do so from the plant.

==== Drumming, singing, and dancing ====
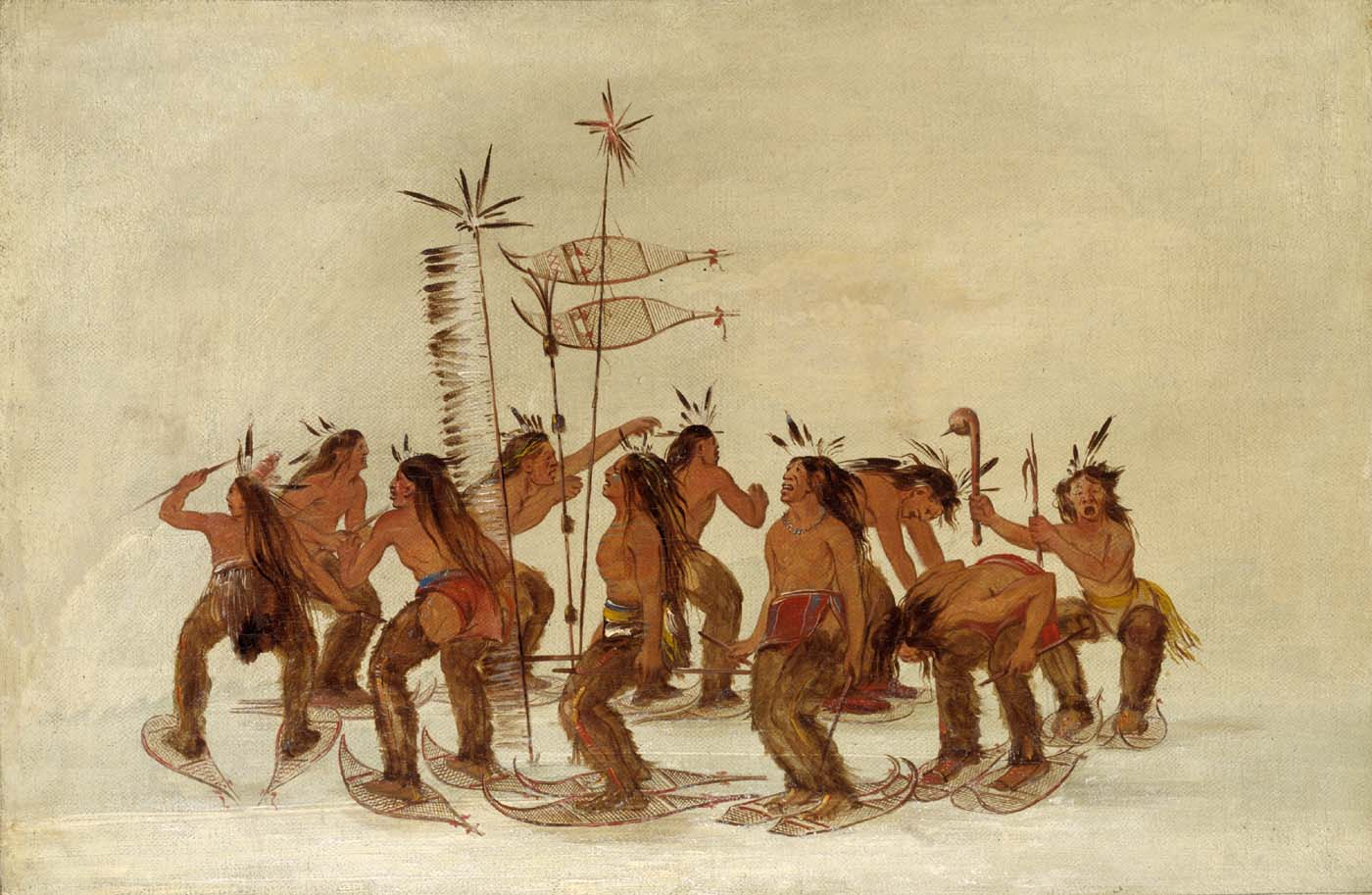
George Catlin's illustration of an Ojibwe Snowshoe Dance, from 1835

Drumming, singing, and dancing play a role in Ojibwe ritual. Songs primarily derive from visions and are considered the property of the visionary. These often consist of cryptic phrases intended for a specific purpose, usually to achieve success in hunting; each song may be directed to the owner manitou of a different species. Other Ojibwe songs serve to retell myths, or accompany the administration of medicine to enforce its potency.

Ojibwe people traditionally observed seasonal celebrations with feasts of thanksgiving to the manitouk. These feasts could be held to mark the maple sap run in spring, the first wild berries in summer, the wild rice harvest in fall, and when the first wild animals were hunted in late fall. There might also be a midwinter feast dedicated to the bears and the manitou that owns them. These seasonal celebrations could include prayers, dances, songs, and the burning of offerings. Dances often initiate the movement of manitouk.

Any Ojibwe, if inspired by a manitouk, might institute a new dance, feast, or ritual. There are also cases of dances being adopted from other Native peoples. In 1878, for instance, certain Ojibwe adopted the Dream Dance from Dakota people. The central feature of this tradition was a circular dance based on the Grass Dance of the Prairies and Plains Natives. The Dream Dance remained active among Ojibwe communities into at least the late 20th century. Some Ojibwe living near the Plains region also engaged in the sun dance, a practice likely adopted from the Cree.

=== Sweat lodge ===
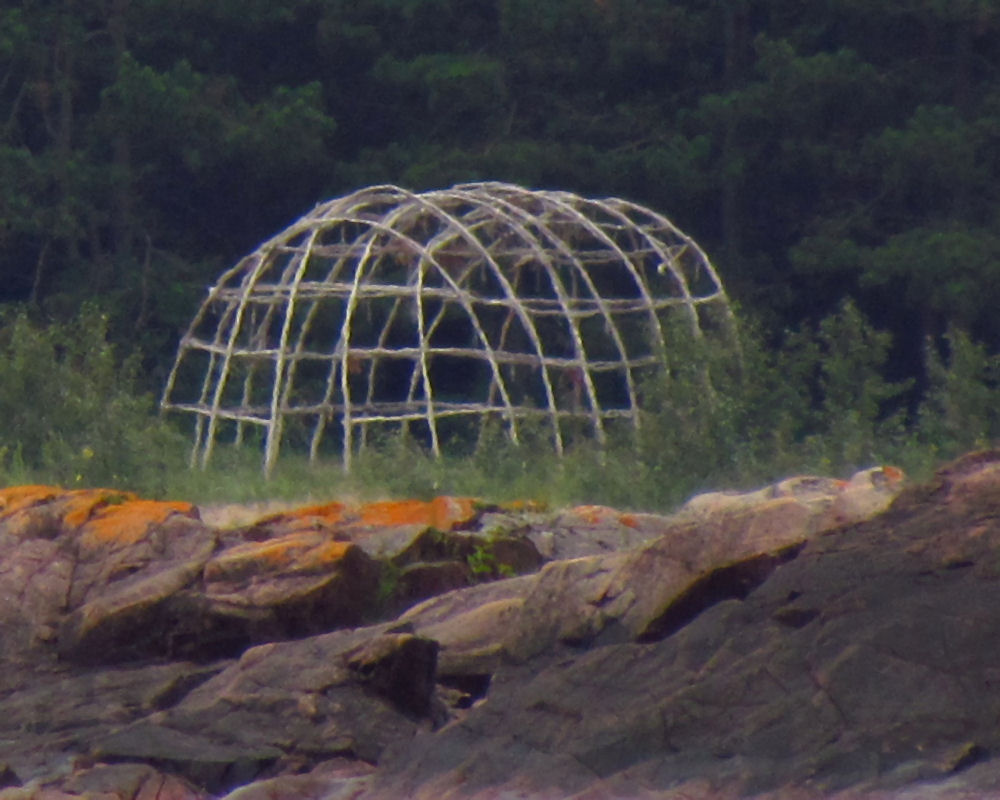
The frame of a sweat lodge at Lake Superior Provincial Park in Wawa, Ontario

Another practice among the Ojibwe is the sweat lodge, the madoodiswan. The purpose of the sweat lodge is to purify and strengthen the person undertaking it. This may be performed on its own or as preparation for another important ceremony or undertaking. On its own, it was often performed to prevent or cure a disease; at other times it was performed before seeking to contact the manitouk or make an important decision. In some cases, these sweat lodges were only available to men, as it was believed that women purified themselves through menstruation.

=== Vision quest ===
Historically, Ojibwe youth reaching puberty would engage in a vision quest. This is something encouraged by their parents and guardians, who sometimes made the youth prepare with shorter fasts beforehand. The main vision quest often took place in the late fall or early spring, and involved the youth going to a secluded place, such as a small lodge. Their face was often marked with charcoal, both to warn other Ojibwe not to offer them food and to make them appear pitiable before the manitouk. The youth would typically fast in isolation for five days, before receiving a little food and then fasting again, with a vision expected between the sixth and tenth day.

In fasting, the youth sought to elicit pity from manitouk, hoping to attract the attention of one of these entities so that they would become the youth's personal guardian. Vecsey characterised this as "the cornerstone of the individual's religious life". Those seekers hoped that their guardian manitou would bestow on them skills in hunting, fishing, fighting, healing, or divining. A manitou who agreed to become a person's guardian would protect and guide them for life, in turn expecting loyalty, respect, and offerings. An individual was not regarded as a complete person until this relationship had been formed. Individuals repeatedly reported journeys then undertaken with their guardian manitou; one Ojibwe was reported as having travelled underwater with a giant turbot while another described flying through the cosmos on the back of an eagle.

Historically, the vision quest was expected of men but not of women, who were believed to already be complete because of their ability to give birth. Some women nevertheless did undertake the rite, although their visions were generally deemed less powerful than those of men. Once a youth had undertaken the vision quest, they were sometimes given a new personal name, which they may then keep secret. Generally, the contents of a vision would also be kept secret for fear that the powers bestowed through them would lose their efficacy. Smith found, in late 20th-century Manitoulin, that the vision quest had not been pursued at puberty for at least three generations. Ojibwe adults nevertheless continued the practice at other times in their lives, often choosing Dreamer's Rock for the purpose.

=== Rites of passage ===
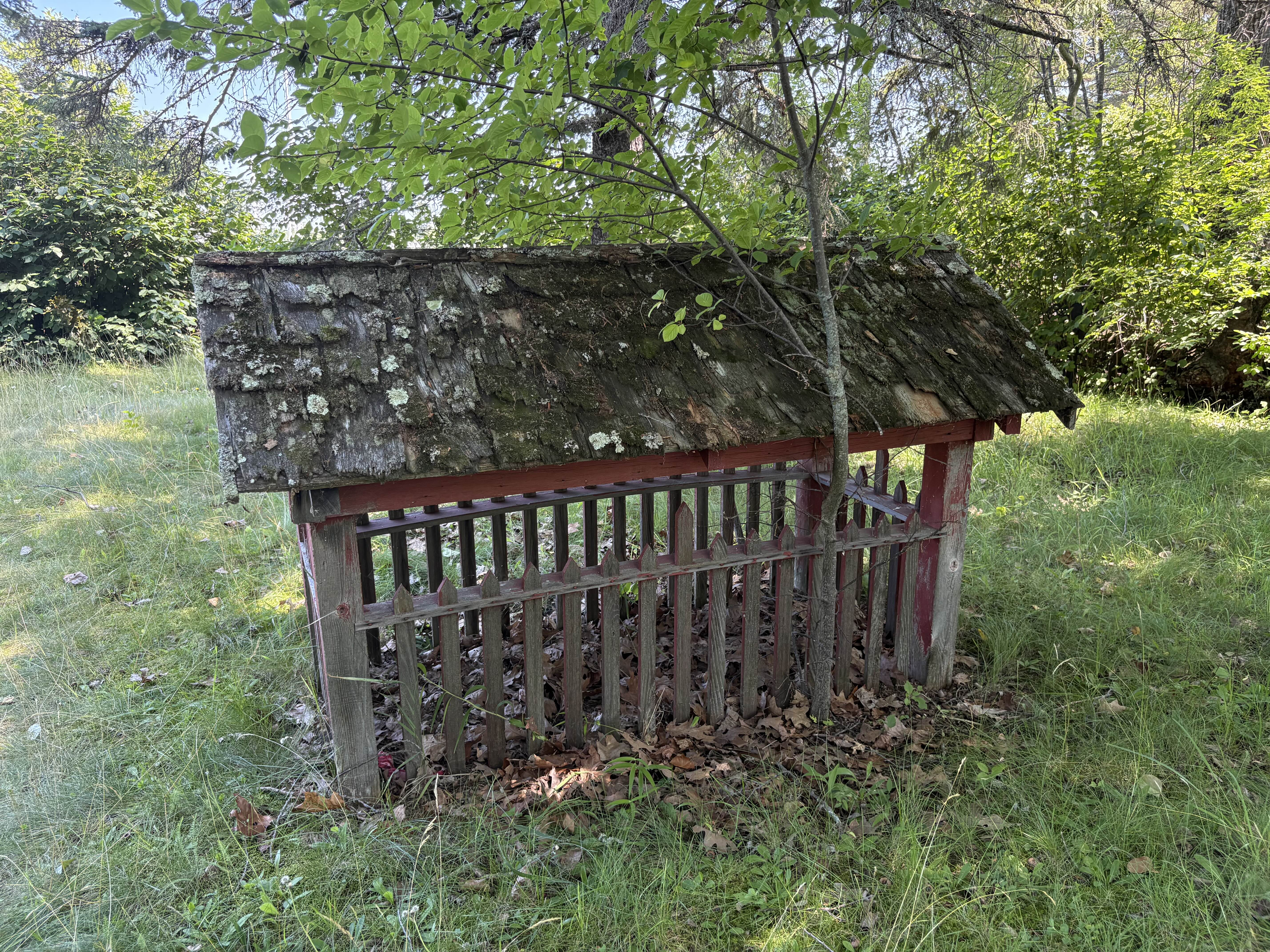
An Ojibwe spirit house, above a grave in the La Pointe Indian Cemetery, Wisconsin

Ojibwe religion features ceremonies marking points on the human lifecycle. Approximately a month after a child's birth, they often undergo a naming ceremony. The name is bestowed on them by a respected elder thought to possess the favour of the manitouk; while giving the child their name, this elder is thought to bestow the blessings of those manitouk upon it. At this event, prayers will also be said for the child's health and long life.

The most important of the lifecycle rites was historically the puberty vision quest. After the individual had undertaken this quest, they would return to their family and a feast would be held. Other rites marking the move from childhood into adulthood include a feast held when a boy kills his first animal, at which celebrants request the blessings of the manitouk owner of the species of said animal. Another ceremony was held for males about to enter battle for the first time, as part of which the individuals blackened their faces and observed certain taboos. When girls experience their first menstruation, they traditionally underwent a period of seclusion in an isolated hut, during which time their face was blackened and they were forbidden from touching themselves with their hands, instead being given a scratching stick.

Historically, elderly individuals were sometimes killed by their family or left on an island to die. Following a death, a mourning ceremony would be held in which the manitouk would be invoked to aid the living. Prior to European contact, a common means of disposing of the Ojibwe dead was to wrap them in bundles and place them in the branches of trees. After European contact, the Ojibwe adopted the practice of burying their dead, with archaeological evidence suggesting that they typically did so after the bones had been defleshed. Respect is accorded to bones as the most durable part of the body. There are also accounts of the Ojibwe erecting gravestones over the graves of their leaders, on which pictographs illustrate important scenes from the deceased's life.

=== Healing ===
Healing and medicine plays a key role in Ojibwe religion. According to Ojibwe myth, illness was not present at the start of the world, but was introduced due to an imbalance in the relationship between humans and the animals they hunt. In Ojibwe lore, illnesses or accidents can be caused by manitouk, witches, or spirits of the dead, and often brought upon a person by their own improper conduct. Specifically, illness is often caused by a foreign object like a feather, shell, or insect, entering a person's body, often placed there by witchcraft. Alternatively, it can be caused by soul loss, with a person's soul having become separated from their body, or because a person has come into contact with a powerful and dangerous material such as menstrual blood.

Traditional healers are termed Mashkikiiwinimiwag or Nenaandawiiwejig; the former derives from the word mashkiki ('medicine'), the latter from nanandawia ('to administer medicines'). These healers are believed to possess the power to use certain herbs for treating particular ailments, something revealed to them by the manitouk; these herbal remedies might be prepared as teas, emulsions, ointments, or as aromatics to use in a sweat bath. Much as the manitouk are thought responsible for causing many illnesses, they are also deemed capable of providing a cure. Historically, many Ojibwe requested a cure from the manitouk through dog sacrifices, and other times offerings of food. Offerings of cloth, beads, or herbs might also be made to request healing, often tied to trees.

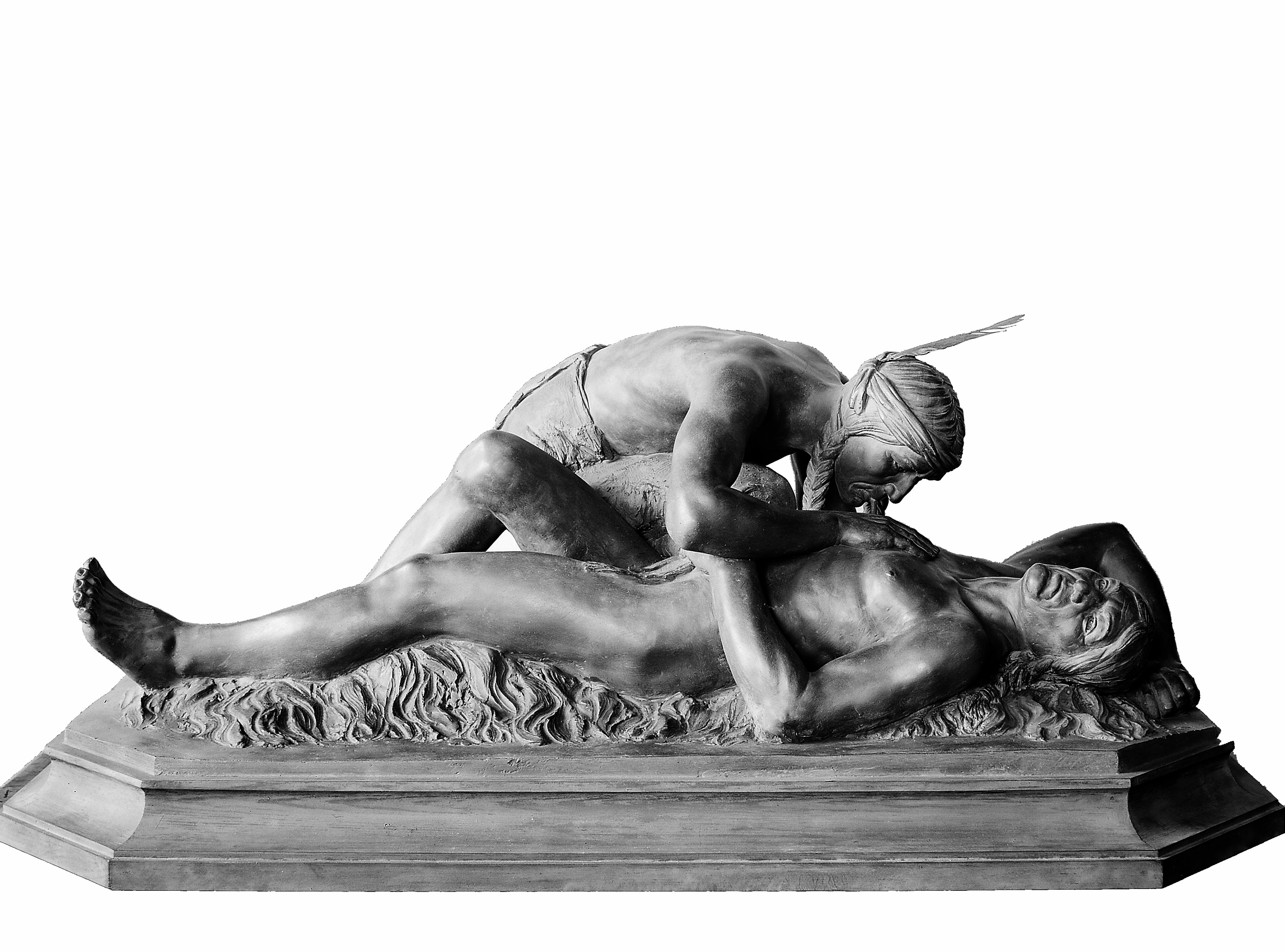
A sculpture in the collection of the Wellcome Trust portraying an Ojibwe healer sucking out sickness from a patient

Prior to performing a healing ceremony, some Ojibwe healers may fast to purify themselves. They might then use smoke to beseech the manitouk for help, with singing and drumming then employed to ask the manitouk for help in determining the cause of the sickness. When using the herbs for healing, these healers will also offer songs and tobacco to the manitouk. Many Ojibwe healers combine traditional remedies with Christian prayers. One method employed by some Ojibwe healers involved sucking through a small bone to draw the sickness out of the afflicted person. Healers claimed that this removed a foreign body from the victim, which would then be spat into a dish for assembled people to see. Generally, it is thought that those with the power to heal could also use it to harm, sometimes involuntarily if they are unable to control their power.

Many Ojibwe have worn amulets to protect themselves from disease or if going into battle. Often, these amulets are made from copper. Amulets are also often placed on a baby's tikanagan (cradleboard) to protect it, including a twine spider web that is believed to catch harmful things approaching the infant. Seashells considered gifts from guardian manitouk may also be used as amulets, most often to achieve success in hunting.

=== Divination ===
Several forms of divination have historically been recorded among the Ojibwe. These have included scrying by looking into water with the intent of finding lost objects or locating game; scapulimancy, by examining the cracks and burns of bones placed near the fire, and drawing inference from them; and drawing interpretations from the way a body trembles. Another method of divination, used for determining the course of war parties, involved rolling stones across smooth ground and interpreting their movement.

=== Witchcraft and bearwalkers ===
Ojibwe people may attribute ill health to witchcraft. This belief was recorded among the Ojibwe from at least the 17th century, and as of the late 20th century was still considered pervasive. Usually, Ojibwe believe that witches targeting them will come from outside their clan, but sometimes acknowledge that a ritual specialist may turn their power onto their own community if they feel slighted.

In Ojibwe lore, methods of cursing include drawing a pictograph of a victim and then damaging or putting poison on it, shooting poison into a victim, poisoning their food, or scratching them with poison. As well as causing illness, sorcerers have also been thought capable of preventing people from catching game, thus contributing to starvation. Ojibwe may hide their cut hair, blood, saliva, or faeces to prevent it being used against them by a witch, reflecting the belief that such material holds an intrinsic connection to the person from which it came. If an Ojibwe feels they have been cursed, they will often turn to a ritual specialist to deal with the problem.

Misfortune is otherwise often attributed to bearwalkers. They also curse people, often firing hairballs into their victims. In Ojibwe belief, bearwalkers can change the form of their traveling soul and often take that of a bear, hence their name. For this reason, any animal encountered is seen as a potential bearwalker in disguise. Alternatively, bearwalkers are also thought to be visible as fireballs or lights in the night. Ojibwe lore maintains that successful people in particular generate envy among others and thus become targets for the bearwalkers.

=== Ritual specialists ===
Generally, Ojibwe believe that people can communicate with manitouk directly and have no need for intermediaries. However, Ojibwe society also contains ritual specialists deemed to possess special powers bestowed on them by the manitouk. These specialists are generally responsible for healing, ensuring good health and long life, controlling the weather, divining, finding game, and leading ceremonies, and are sometimes deemed to have a role in keeping the universe in equilibrium. Although a ritual specialist will often focus on a particular type of healing or ritual knowledge, some individuals are deemed to possess multiple powers from the manitouk. Multiple types of specialist existed among the Ojibwe at the time of European contact, and since then English-speaking European observers have generally referred to them all with the generic term "medicine man" or sometimes with its Ojibwa translation, mashkikiiwinini. Over time, these terms have become increasingly popular.

Those deemed to possess power from the manitouk and who could practice medicine were important to Ojibwe bands, and were expected to use their powers to benefit their band as a whole. These individuals worked for prestige rather than payment and generally received no fee when providing services to their own kin. Those possessing such powers have been respected but also feared; Vecsey noted that Ojibwe would view these specialists with "awe, respect, dependence, and fear". Fear and hatred have particularly been reserved for those specialists deemed to have misused their powers. They are thought possible of stealing or disrupting a person's soul to generate sickness, with babies being particularly vulnerable. Specialists worked independently, rather than in larger associations or groups. Although women could become ritual specialists, this was generally rare.

The Ojibwe historically had no division between civil and religious authority, with historian Michael Angel noting that those who obtained supernatural power often accrued "socio-political power" in Ojibwe society. Various ritual specialists also served as ogimaag, senior males in the nomadic band; English language observers often translated ogimaag as "chiefs". Attending the ogimaag in Ojibwe bands was the oshkaabewis or "ceremonial messenger," responsible for various civil and religious functions, for instance serving as the pipe bearer in ceremonies. The Ojbwe typically have no ritual clowns like the heyoka found among Sioux groups, although a society akin to the heyoka were reported among Ojibwe groups living in the Plains during the early 20th century.

==== Jiisakiiwiniwag ====
The ritual specialist most commonly recorded in historical accounts was the Jiisakiiwinini (plural Jiisakiiwiniwag), sometimes called a djessakid. These were usually male, although some post-menopausal woman also held the role. Their abilities came through visions, after which they could engage in rites that summoned spirit helpers before communicating with them through singing and drumming. Their powers to translate the messages of the manitouk were regarded as a gift from the animikeek, while the owner manitou of the turtles was historically often referred to as their patron.

The Jiisakiiwiniwag's ceremony is called Jiisakiiwin, although in English it came to be known as the shaking tent or conjuring lodge ritual. This is a rite found among several Northern Algonquian peoples, although also has similarities with ceremonies among other Woodlands and Plains groups, such as the Lakota yuwípi wičháša. It is considered a powerful ritual and one that can bring harm to those who perform it and their family. For this reason, children were often prohibited from pretending to be Jiisakiiwiniwag.

The Jiisakiiwin facilitated two-way communication between humans and manitouk. It was typically performed for a specific reason, often to find a cure for an ailment, to gain knowledge of enemy movements during war, to locate game, to find lost objects, or to protect the community from imminent windigos. Alternatively, it might involve conjuring the spirit of a dead person if their past conduct was causing their descendant's problems, or might conjure a witch to encourage them into stopping their harmful actions.

Prior to overseeing the rite, the Jiisakiiwinini often undertook a sweat bath to purify and strengthen themselves. The main ceremony then took place in a tent, commonly erected by the Jiisakiiwinini and their assistants. At sunset, the ritual specialist then often approached the tent, around which community members typically assembled. After singing to summon the manitouk, the Jiisakiiwinini might address these spirits and remind them of their obligations to humanity. The Jiisakiiwini's arms were then bound and they crawled into the tent, where they knelt or lay on boughs.

The tent then shook, while animal-like sounds came from within it, presented as evidence for the arrival of a manitou. These entities were believed to be present in the tent, although not thought to possess the Jiisakiiwinini. The noise and shaking was typically followed by silence, after with the Jiisakiiwinini revealed that the spirits are ready to be asked questions. Questions asked often revolved around requesting a cure for sickness, assistance in finding a marriage partner, and help in finding game to hunt. The ritual specialist then responded with the spirit's answers. Tobacco was often offered to the spirit, sometimes being passed into the tent. There was often an atmosphere of levity, with those outside bantering and joking with the spirits inside. The Jiisakiiwinini would subsequently appear untied, suggesting that his bonds had been untied by the manitouk.

=== Midewiwin ===
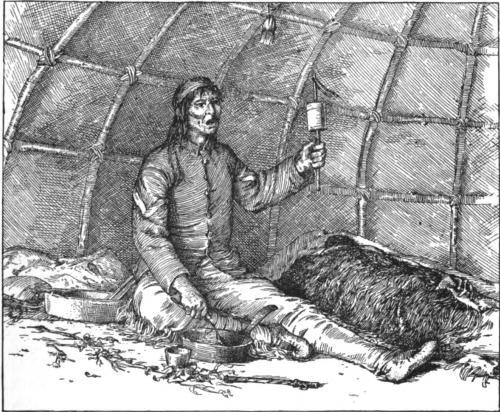
An illustration, first published in 1891, of a mide undertaking a Midewiwin ritual

An important part of Ojibwe religion has been played by the Midewiwin society, which in English is sometimes referred to as the medicine society, grand medicine society, or grand medicine dance. This is often regarded as a secret society, one that placed a major concern on health, with its members being instructed in various medical treatments.

Members are referred to as mides, and include both men and women. New initiates pay a fee, historically in goods but later in currency, to join. The Midewiwin is organised hierarchically, with accounts varying as to it having four, eight, or sixteen initiatory degrees or levels. The first four levels are considered "earth grades" while those above are the more senior "sky grades". Progression through the degrees was enabled by the payment of further fees and additional initiation ceremonies, as well as the attainment of new proficiencies including knowledge of songs, stories, and medicinal remedies.

Which manitouk is considered the founding chief of the mide varies. Historically, claims have been made for Nanabush, the bear manitou, otter manitou, and the miigis shell manitou. By the start of the 21st century, Kitche Manitou was generally regarded as the patron of the Midewiwin. Various origin myths are offered about the Midewiwin. One maintains that the underwater manitouk created the Midewiwin and gave it to Nanabush to appease him after they had flooded the Earth. These myths were sometimes recited by the group's leaders at major ceremonies.

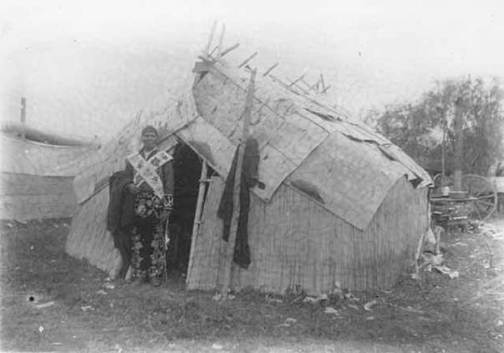
Photograph of a midewigaan or mide lodge in which Midewiwin ceremonies took place

According to modern Ojibwe oral tradition, the Midewiwin originated prior to the Ojibwe's contact with Europeans. This claim is supported by some archaeologists, based on discoveries of pre-contact dog and bear remains in contexts suggestive of mide lodges. Conversely, various historians argue that the Midewiwin emerged after the Ojibwe's contact with Europeans, likely among the Chequamegon Ojibwes following their migration to the southern shore of Lake Superior in the 1690s. According to this argument, from there it probably spread to other Ojibwe, although was not adopted among the northern Ojibwe, nor among their closest neighbors, the Cree and Ottawas. Instead, it spread to some other groups like the Potawatomi, Menominee, and Fox. The earliest historical records of the society date from 1804.

Vecsey suggested that the society's "systematised ceremonialism" was different from that of more traditional Ojibwe religion, and that its practices suggested both traditional Ojibwe and Christian influence. The Christian cross for instance appeared as the insignia for one of the Midewiwin degrees. Despite this, the Midewiwin often criticised Christianity and encouraged opposition to Christian missionaries; they often also opposed the emergence of other religious traditions, like peyotism and the Shawnee Prophet religion. Midewiwin was common until the early 20th century, but saw its influence recede from the 1930s. By the late 20th century it was rare, persisting only in a few locations.

==== Midewiwin practices ====
Midewiwin ceremonies vary based on location and the requirements and abilities of the mide involved. Through the society, the mide seek assistance from the manitouk, to whom they direct their prayers, sometimes accompanied by offerings of tobacco and dog sacrifices. These prayers often reflected traditional Ojibwe concerns regarding game, food, good health, and long life. Mide ceremonies commonly also involve the use of medicine bags containing objects like tobacco, megis shells, dried roots and herbs.

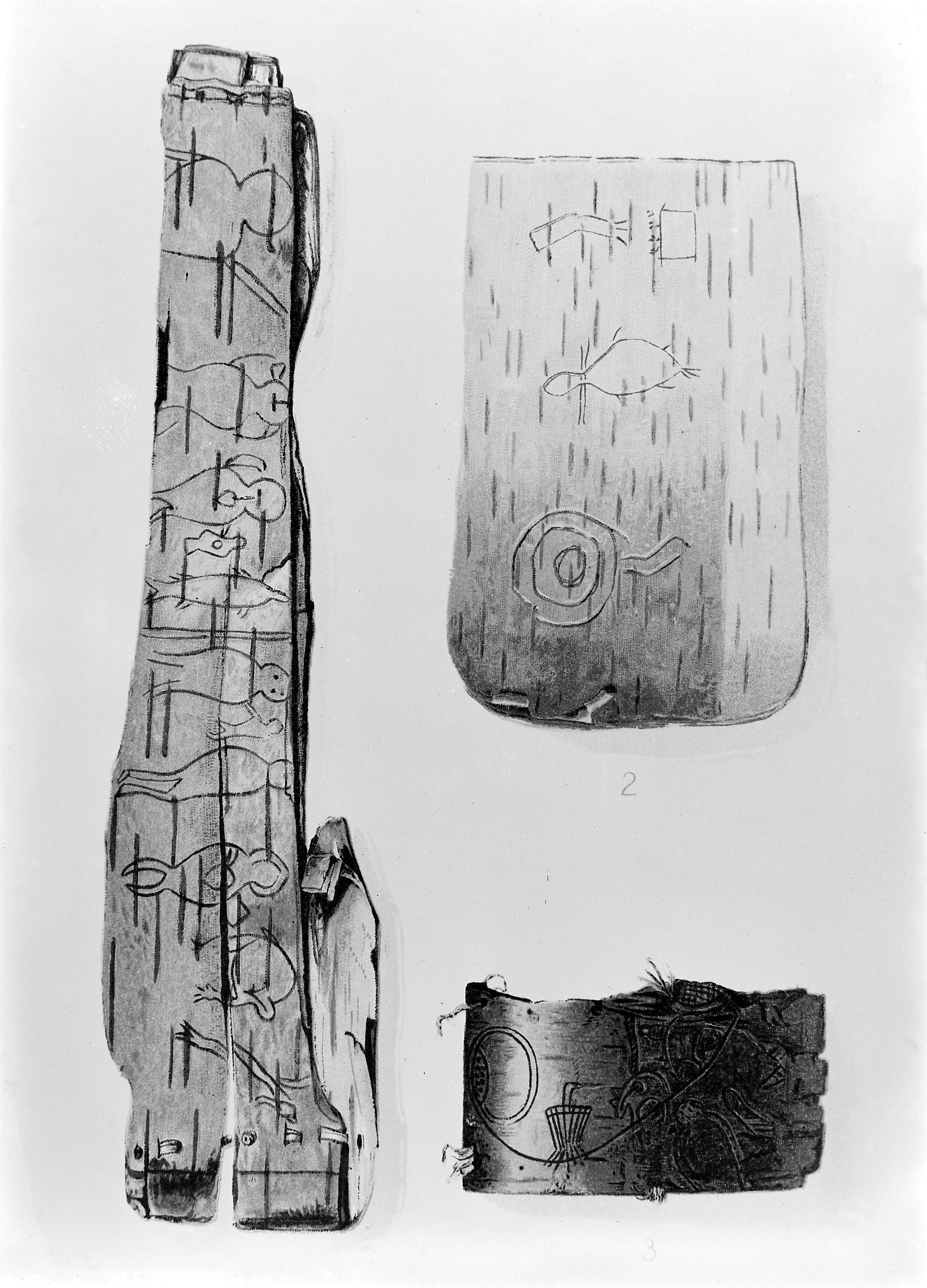
Examples of birch bark recordings collected by the Wellcome Collection

Commonly, an individual was expected to have received visions of manitouk before they could seek initiation. A common membership requirement was to have been cured of sickness, with some of those who joined being sick and hoping that their involvement would bring healing. Both Waabanowag and Jiisakiiwininiwag could join the Midewiwin, although there could be animosity between these different groups, with some accounts indicating that senior mide sometimes opposed these rival specialists.

The society organised the medicine society dance, a major communal gathering that occurred once or twice a year. In the early 19th century, these gatherings attracted thousands of southwestern Ojibwes to Chequamegon. In contrast to these Midewiwin gatherings, individual mide usually undertook healing rituals independently rather than in a group setting. Within Ojibwe communities, the Midewiwin often inspired fear and respect, with there sometimes being a taboo regarding talking about the society, as doing so was thought to potentially conjure harmful spirits.

One of the Midewiwin's characteristics was its use of pictographic records, with the mide producing birchbark scrolls which were passed down from teachers to students. These recounted origin myths, cosmological maps, accounts of the migration of the Ojibwe peoples, and advice for how to live well. They also provided visual memory aids for the performance of ceremonies. Vecsey suggested that these scrolls served as "sacred scriptures" for the Midewiwin and may have been influenced by encounters with the Christian Bible. The use of scrolls was, however, known to the Ojibwe prior to European contact; scroll fragments have been archaeologically recovered that have been dated to around 1560.

== History ==
=== Prehistory ===
Around 1200 CE, the hunting culture to which the Ojibwe belonged emerged in the conifer forests around the Great Lakes. Prior to European contact, the Ojibwe's subsistence relied heavily on hunting and fishing, supplementing this diet with foraged plant sources. The Ojibwe lived in small kinship groups, each an extended family that was politically autonomous, although they met with other groups for specific occasions and exchanged members for marriage, ensuring regular contact between different Ojibwe groups. It was only following the European encounter that the Ojibwe developed a common identity, and by the 19th century they were beginning to perceive themselves as a nation or tribe.

=== Encounters with Christianity and colonialism ===
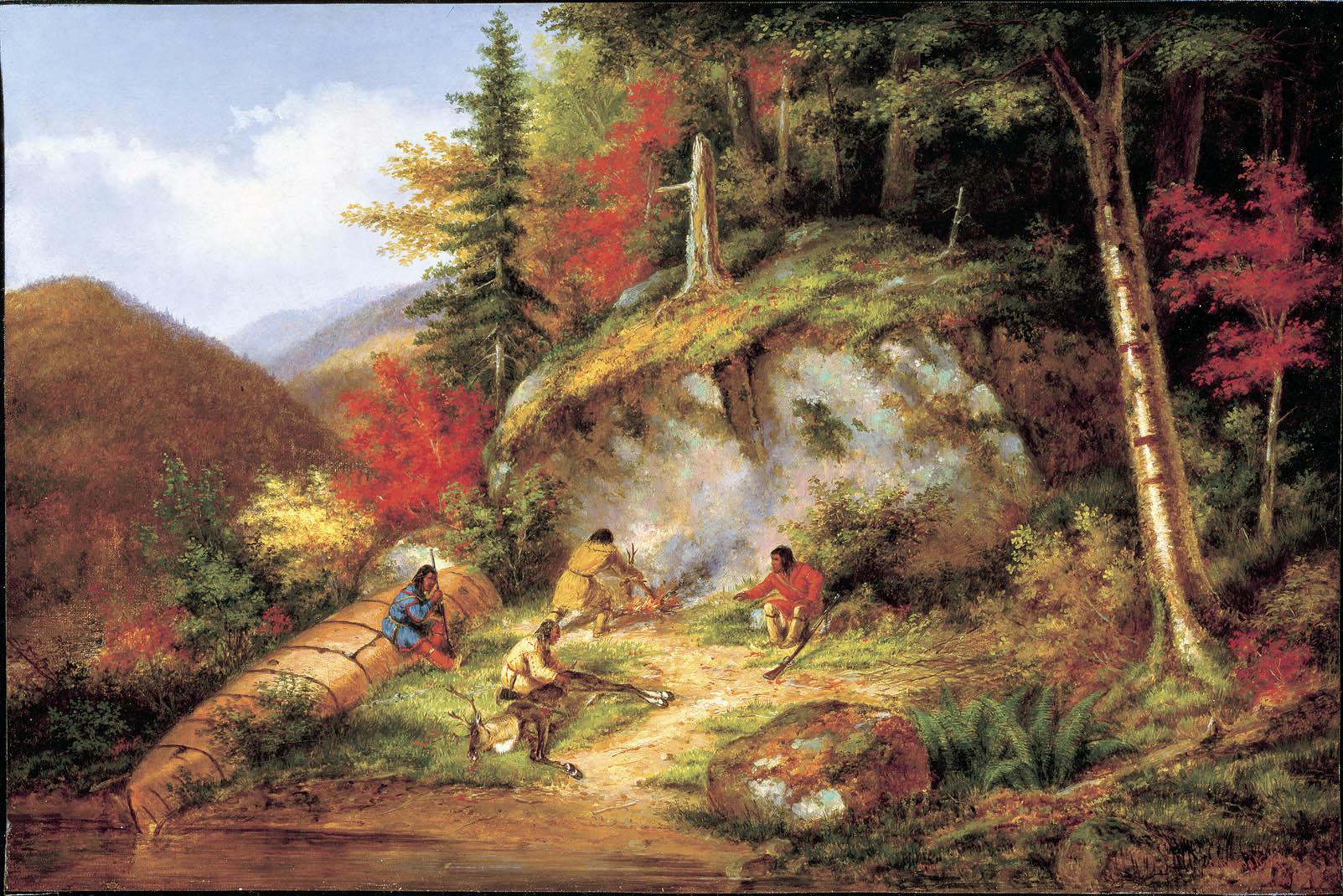
An 1861 painting of an Ojibwe group by the Dutch-born Canadian artist Cornelius Krieghoff

The earliest written accounts of the Ojibwe were produced by Europeans in the 17th century. The Ojibwe's first encounters with French colonists were probably around 1610, as French trappers pushed west in search of beaver pelts. Roman Catholic missionaries followed, with Ojibwe first encountering Franciscans in 1622 and the Jesuits in 1641. In the 1670s the Jesuits established a mission at the Sault, with a sparse Roman Catholic missionary effort continuing through the 18th century. Ojibwe communities sometimes adopted the Jesuits' ritual paraphernalia, such as crucifixes, icons, and rosary beads, and used them as amulets. New Roman Catholic missions were created on the Earl of Selkirk's Red River Colony in 1815, with the 1820s seeing more concerted Roman Catholic proselytization efforts among the Ojibwe.

The 1820s also saw the formation of Anglican, Methodist, and Presbyterian missions to Ojibwe communities, particularly those in the United States and southeast Ontario. There was much competition and rivalry among these Christian missionary groups; Roman Catholics were generally more tolerant of Ojibwe cultural practices like family feasts and mourning customs than their Protestant rivals. European-American society put increasing pressure on the Ojibwe to abandon their traditional religion. Some Ojibwe integrated traditional and Christian rituals; the Pembina Ojibwe Joseph Abita Gekek for instance helped promote conversions to Catholicism among Red Lake Ojibwes in 1882 by instituting a prayer dance which was traditional in form but devoted to the Christian God.

As Christian missionary influence grew, so did Ojibwe opposition. Many resented that Ojibwe land was being parcelled off for Christian missions and that Indian annuities were also being directed to fund them. Various historians have argued that the Midewiwin may have emerged as a revitalisation movement in response to European-American expansion, offering an alternative worldview to that of the Christians and a means of resistance to it. The Ojibwe were also substantially affected by diseases introduced by the Europeans, especially smallpox, during the 18th and 19th centuries; this resulted in a rise in witchcraft accusations as well as fuelling conversions to Christianity.

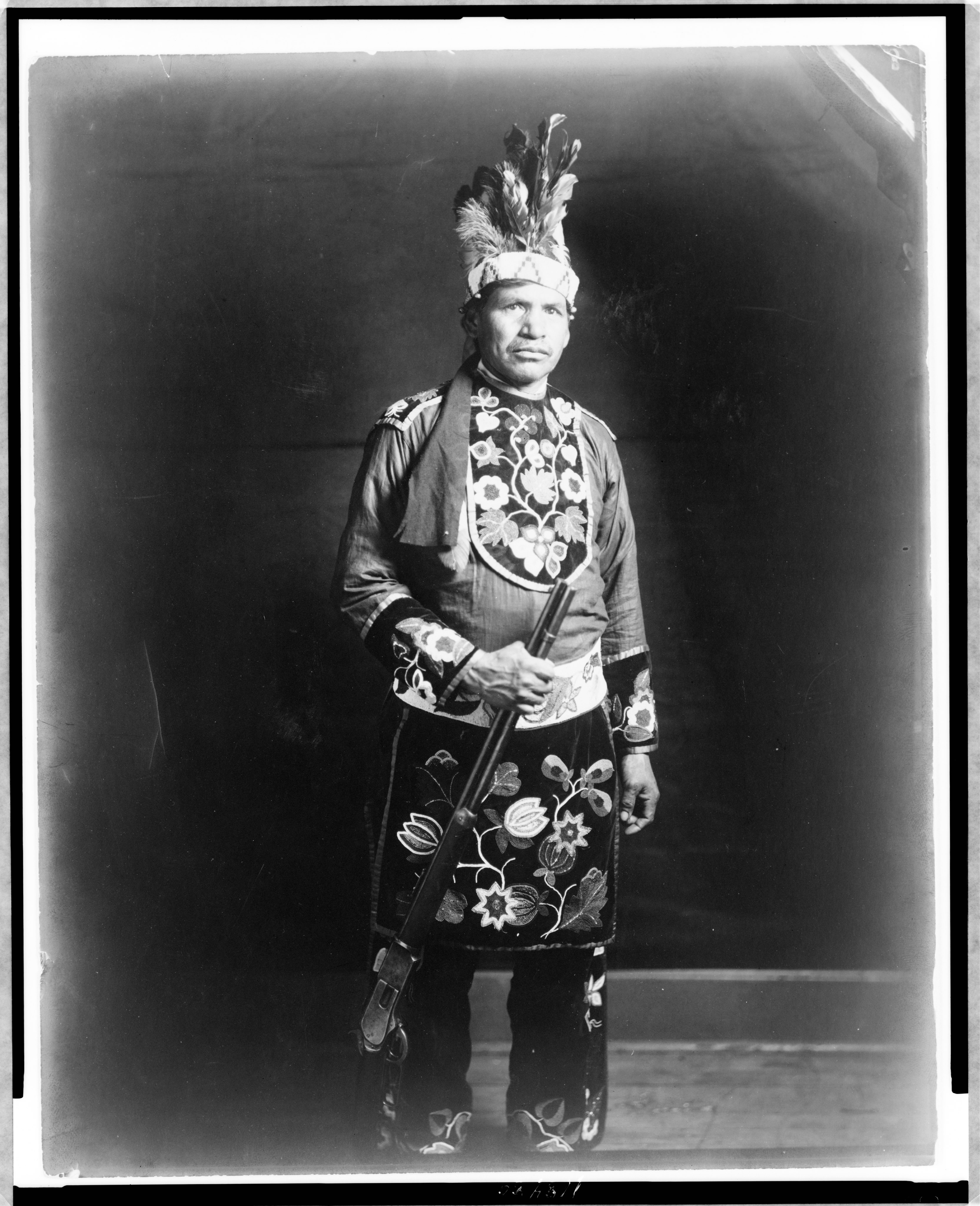
An Ojibwe man photographed in 1918

Some Ojibwe who converted to Christianity probably sincerely believed in Christian teachings but others likely converted to receive gifts from missionaries or to secure alliances with Christian Europeans. Others may have felt that Christianity possessed greater healing power than their traditional religion, or drew upon both Christianity and their established custom, for instance regarding Jesus as another manitou. Some Ojibwe who converted continued to believe in the manitouk, but reinterpreted them as demons. In some cases, Christian elements were incorporated into the Midewiwin ceremonies, although more broadly the Midewiwin society increasingly had to operate underground and saw its numbers dwindle. Fearing that it would die out, some Midewiwin members informed European-Americans about its practices so that they might write it down.

European colonisation brought substantial change for the Ojibwe. By the 1870s, Ojibwe in both Canada and the United States were predominantly living on reservations, with government policies dedicated to transforming them from hunter-gatherers to settled agriculturalists. In the 1870s, President Ulysses S. Grant's policies in the U.S. placed missionaries in charge of Native reservations, resulting in greater success in the conversion of many Ojibwe. By the late 19th century, the Ojibwe in southeast Ontario were largely Christian. Christian organisations, often supported by the government, established boarding schools in which Ojibwe children were acculturated to European cultural norms and distanced from their traditional culture. Various religious customs, including the puberty vision quest, traditions regarding menstruation, and war initiation ceremonies, eventually died out or become increasingly rare in Ojibwe communities. By the mid-20th century, Christianity had reached all areas inhabited by Ojibwe. At some point, peyotism had also been introduced to some Ojibwe.

=== Revivalism ===
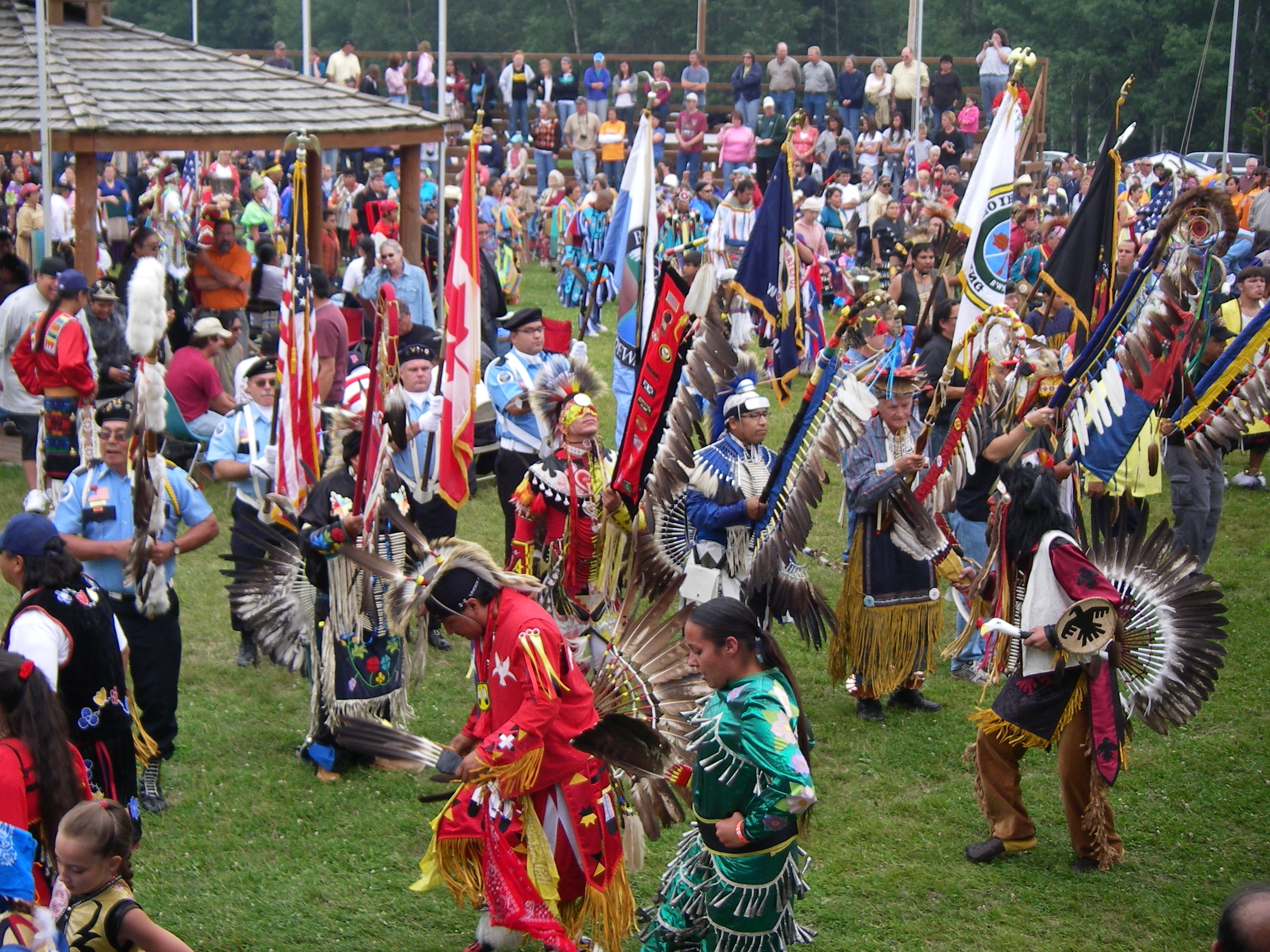
A 2009 powwow held at the Grand Portage Indian Reservation, home to the Minnesota Chippewa Tribe, an Ojibwe group in Minnesota

Writing in the 1990s, Smith observed that Ojibwe religion had undergone "a great revival". The Woodlands style of art, associated with the work of Norval Morrisseau in the 1960s, often featured traditional myth in its imagery and contributed to this religious resurgence. Various Ojibwe sought to recreate the Midewiwin, relying on recorded accounts of the practice to do so. Many Ojibwe have interpreted this cultural revival as a fulfilment of the Seven Fires prophecy; the Seventh Prophecy had recounted a rebirth of the Ojibwe people and a return to their ancestral ways.

In 1968, several Ojibwe Natives founded the American Indian Movement (AIM) activist group. AIM soon gained a Lakota focus as its members sought the guidance of Lakota religious leader Leonard Crow Dog. Lakota religious influences subsequently fed into Ojibwe communities. The scholar of religion Suzanne Owen noted that she had seen Ojibwe people using the Lakota term mitakuye oyasin as a means of encapsulating Native American perspectives on life more broadly. The Ojibwe have been criticized by some Lakota as 'cultural thieves', since the term has been historically specific to the Lakota people and their relatives.

== Reception and legacy ==
Smith noted that many of the Ojibwe she encountered saw their traditional religion not as a culturally bound system but as something that might contribute to a new world philosophy. One Ojibwe, Wa’na’nee’che, for instance taught sweat lodge ceremonies to people in the United Kingdom during the 2000s.

Ojibwe religion has sometimes faced a negative response from Christians, with Christian missionaries often perceiving the manitouk as demons. The religion of the Ojibwes has attracted less academic attention than the traditions of some of their Native neighbors, in part due to the absence of any 19th-century revivalist movement under a clear leader, something seen in certain other Native communities.
