= Shaking tent ceremony =

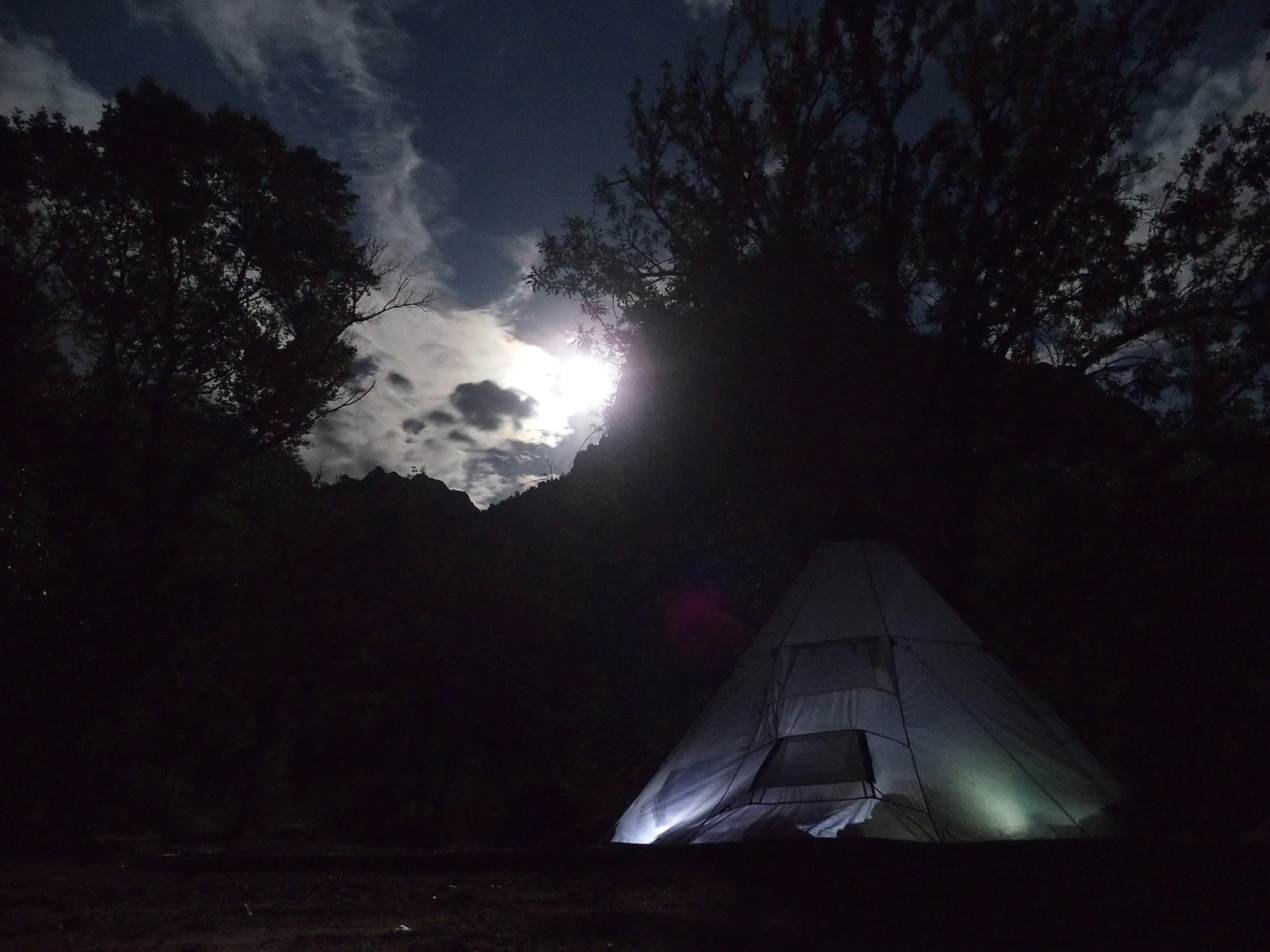
Shaking tents could be a lodge or a teepee used to summon spirits

Shaking tent ceremony is a ritual of some Indigenous people in North America that is used to connect the people with the spirit realm and establish a connection and line of communication between the spirit world and the mortal world. These ceremonies require special tents or lodges to be made, and are performed under the direction of a medicine man, or spiritual leader, who uses different practices, rituals, and materials to perform the ceremony. This ceremony is more commonly used by specific indigenous tribes long ago but is still practiced around the continent today.

== Ceremony ==
Members of the tribe or the tribe as a whole would need to know about something, so the medicine man of the tribe would go to the spirits for answers. The ceremony took place at night in a conical tent. The medicine person would enter, sometimes naked, sometimes tied up. In the tent, the medicine person smoked a pipe or sang songs to attract the spirits. Once the spirits enter the tent, the tent starts shaking violently and other voices besides the medicine person's is heard. The spiritual leaders receive the answers needed and comes out of the tent, exhausted. The ceremony can take many hours and can be witnessed by many outside the tent. This otherworldly event can help tribes receive the revelation they need to help their tribes moving forward.

== History ==
Although the origin of this ceremony is not quite known, Samuel Champlain wrote about it in the early 17th century as he travelled to present-day Canada for France. Some think that this is one of the first ceremonies to be watched and written about in America. There are several written accounts of this ceremony and most agree that the tent is a circular shape and covered in some material. Most write about the violent shaking they witnessed and noises they heard coming from the tent, these accounts vary depending on the style the tribe uses to conduct the ceremony and the personality of the writer, but most accounts explain a central theme. The Ojibwa tribe that uses this ceremony would use it around the fall and springtime as other tribes gather and use this great ceremony to influence the other tribes around them. The Cree tribe historically called this ceremony the Bow Pole Dance, but more recently has conferred it the name “Spirit Lodge”. The Cree would use the ceremony to help their children to understand the power of ceremonies and how useful these ceremonies can be. They would also use this ceremony to cure sickness and even reported that terminal cancer has been cured through this ceremony. The Cree showed spikes in using this ceremony in the 1960s and went to another tribe for their strong spiritual leader for cures to their ailments. This ceremony in today’s society is still used but not as openly accepted as it once was but it still seen as a huge part of their culture. In recent days, some people believe that this ceremony has been corrupted and is used to kill people, while others believe that it is still a part of their identity and should be used to help their tribes. Those who want to keep to their culture are trying to keep this ceremony remembered and alive.

== Tribes ==
There are many tribes in Canada and the Northern United States that practice this ceremony. It is a way to connect to their spiritual side and find answers to all questions of life. One of the most notable tribes that have practiced this ceremony is the Algonquin tribe, which some say is the most prominent tribe to use this ceremony. Other tribes are the Gros Ventres, Assiniboine, Blackfeet, Mi'kmaq, Ojibwe, Cree, and some other tribes in Northern Canada and Quebec.

=== Similarities ===
The overarching theme of this ceremony is to bring spirits into the tent to gain knowledge of a mystery or event they need to know about. The spirit will enter the tent through the top and the spirit will also leave through the top of the tent. The me that conducts the ceremony is the only one to understand and communicate with the spirit and they are not possessed or a vessel for the spirit but just the spokesperson for them. The ceremony is started at night with the leader smoking a pipe and then singing songs that help summon the spirit. The tent will shake harshly for hours as the leader and spirit are communicating and can be so harsh that it seems like the tent will fall over, but never does. The people near or inside the tent often hear different voices speaking in the tent. The leader will exit the tent when all of the questions have been answered and they tend to be exhausted after the long conversation with the spirits. Knowledge is gained from this ceremony and is used to help the tribe and can range from helping to find lost items to helping see the future and understand their fates.

=== Differences ===
Over the vast area that this ceremony is conducted, there are differences that follow each tribe. Some of the main differences are smaller details in the ceremony. One difference that some tribes do that others do not, is the use of food. Tribes will bring a plate of food for the spirit that the spirit can eat, and enjoy when coming back to offer knowledge. Another difference is some tribes will have only one spirit come to the tent, which tends to be related to the leader conducting the ceremony. Other tribes can have multiple spirits coming into the tent, it tends to be just one human spirit and the rest animal spirits coming into the tent. Some tribes have other people in the tent to witness or be there for the ceremony, while others do not, it is the leader and only the leader job to perform the ceremony. The leader can have different ways to enter the tent. Some tribes have the leader go into the tent naked and with a pipe, others tie up the leader in different material and have him go in the tent. Lastly, a difference between the Shaking tent ceremony is humor. The tribes with multiple spirits coming into the tent tend to have a more joking sense of humor and will banter with the leader while they are there. The one spirit tribes do not have any humor or banter in their ceremony and the spirit is there to help the leader will the knowledge he is seeking. The knowledge that is sought depends on their current surroundings and how the tribe is partial to using the shaking tent ceremony.

== Medicine men ==
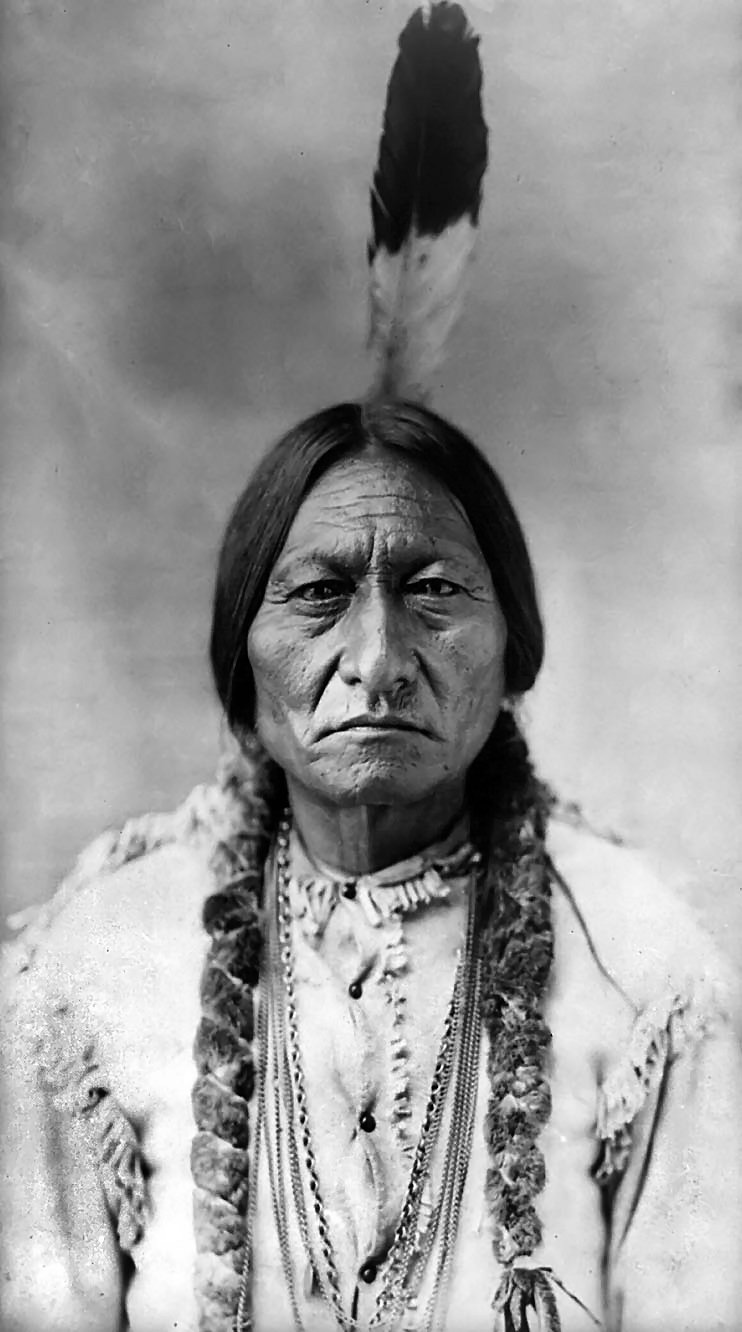
Medicine men, like Sitting Bull, could perform the Shaking Tent ceremony

Connecting to the spirit world was important to all classes in the different tribes. They connected to their ancestors for guidance, support, unity, and to keep their identity as a member of a Native American tribe. Although the ceremonies are open to everyone, the level and immersion of the ceremony depended somewhat on what class and how much wealth a person had. Those who were wealthier were able to afford the most respected medicine men and have the best herbs and tents available. Some tents were more like log cabins than tipis. The less wealthy people had access to a common spiritual leader and were able to make or have a smaller, weaker tent created. The level of wealth did not determine the level of worthiness; however, wealthier people could perform the ceremony more often so they have a stronger connection to the spirit world than the lower classes.

Medicine people are important members of the tribe because they are the spiritual leaders and guides to the tribe's ancestors. Medicine people can be men and women, they just need to have the knowledge and spirituality to be able to connect and perform to the rituals. To the indigenous tribes every human, plant, and animal has a spirit, and a spiritual leader is able to more easily recognize and communicate with the spirits around them. Connecting to other spirits and the spirit world benefits people’s mental health, by giving them a place and a purpose in their community. Connecting to the spirits of others is also important because it connects the people to the Earth, and gives the people a relationship with the earth and materials they use, as well as a direct link to their ancestors and traditions that tend to be forgotten over time.

== Resources for the ceremony ==
=== Plants ===
Long ago the plants used in these kinds of ceremonies were used as an entryway to the spirit world. Each plant has a different level of sacredness and use in the ceremony. Many rituals involve the use of psychedelic plants, and a medicine person is more or less a spiritual herbalist. The plants were used in a variety of ways but were more commonly smoked than anything else. Each different plant served a different purpose whether it was to cast out evil spirits, or to ground and calm other spirits. Plants not only healed people spiritually but ceremonies were also performed with plants to heal people of physical ailments. The information available today does not go into detail about the specific types of plants used, but the knowledge that the people have about the plants can aid progresses in current medicines today.

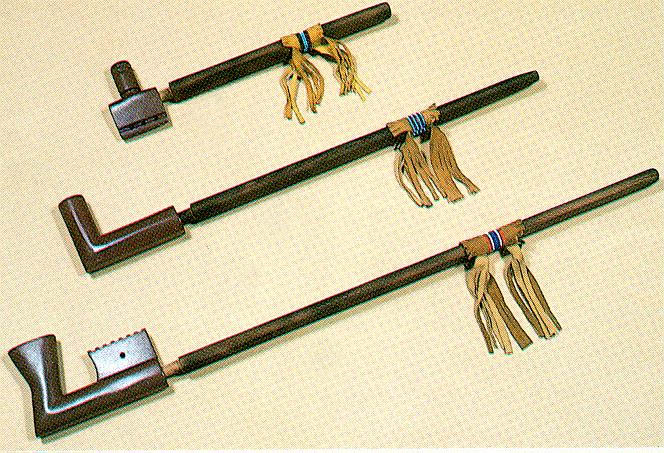
Spiritual leader would use a pipe in the Shaking tent ceremony, sometimes for the spirit to use

=== Tents ===
To perform a shaking tent ceremony there was not just one type of structure that was necessary. Most tents or lodges were constructed in more of a cylindrical shape, with the frame made out of sticks which was then covered with some kind of canvas or material, depending on what resources were available. The tents were made to offer sacrifices in, and were constructed to keep and filter the different smoke and incense involved in the ceremony. The tents and lodges were not very elaborate, but the stronger, better, and more sacred materials when constructing the tent were used for the more wealthy. These structures provided a sacred place away from the world to connect and be healed by the spirits around them.
