= Odawa religion =

Traditional Native American religion

Odawa religion is the traditional Native American religion of the Odawa people. Found primarily in north-eastern North America, it is practiced within Odawa communities in Canada and the United States. The tradition has no formal leadership or organizational structure and displays much internal variation.

== Definition ==
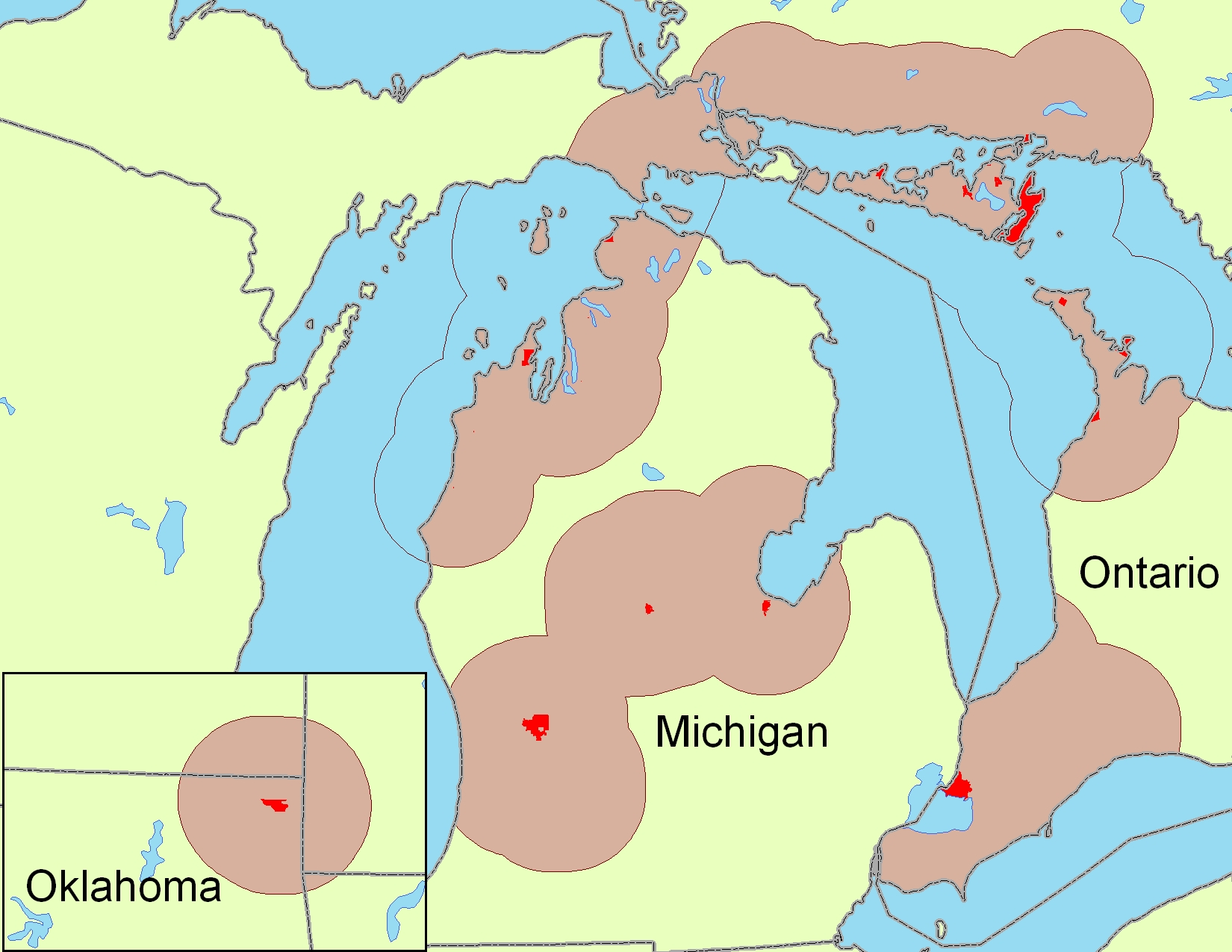
Areas inhabited by Odawa people

Native American religions more broadly have always adapted in response to environmental changes and interactions with other communities. The Odawa's religion is particularly similar to that of the Ojibwe people.
