= Wang Nangxian =

Chinese rebel (1778–1798)

- Portrait of Wang Nangxian
- Born: Wang Achong (王阿崇); 1778; Nanlong Prefecture, Guizhou, Qing China (now Anlong County, Qianxinan Bouyei and Miao Autonomous Prefecture, Guizhou, China)
- Died: 1798 (aged 20); Beijing, Qing China
- Cause of death: Execution
- Occupation: Leader of the White Lotus Rebellion

Wang Nangxian (Chinese: 王囊仙; pinyin: Wáng Nángxiān; Bouyei: Waangz Naangzsianl; 1778–1798) was a female Chinese leader of the anti-Manchu White Lotus Rebellion along with Wang Cong'er during the reign of the Qing dynasty. Another female member of the rebellion along with Wang Cong'er, she declared herself divine and commanded her own troops in battle against the Imperial army.

== Early life ==
Reportedly born in 1778 in Dongsa Hamlet in Nanlong Prefecture (present-day Anlong County in Guizhou) and was of Bouyei descent, Wang was raised in a family of Mo ritual experts. Using spells thought by her family, she became known for the "crossing the darkness" ritual, where she believed her five-colored stones gave her healing powers, claiming her magic was divinely ordained. She used tricks like planting rice to gain followers, earning the name Wang Nangxian which in Bouyei language means "Immortal Lady Wang" as people sought her for cures and predictions, offering gifts in return. Her half-brother, Wang Huaming, exploited this by building a temple where they could collect offerings, restricting direct access to Wang. Concerns about rebellion led to arrests in 1795, but investigations by government officials found no sedition; the group was seen as harmless traditionalists.

== The 1797 Uprising ==
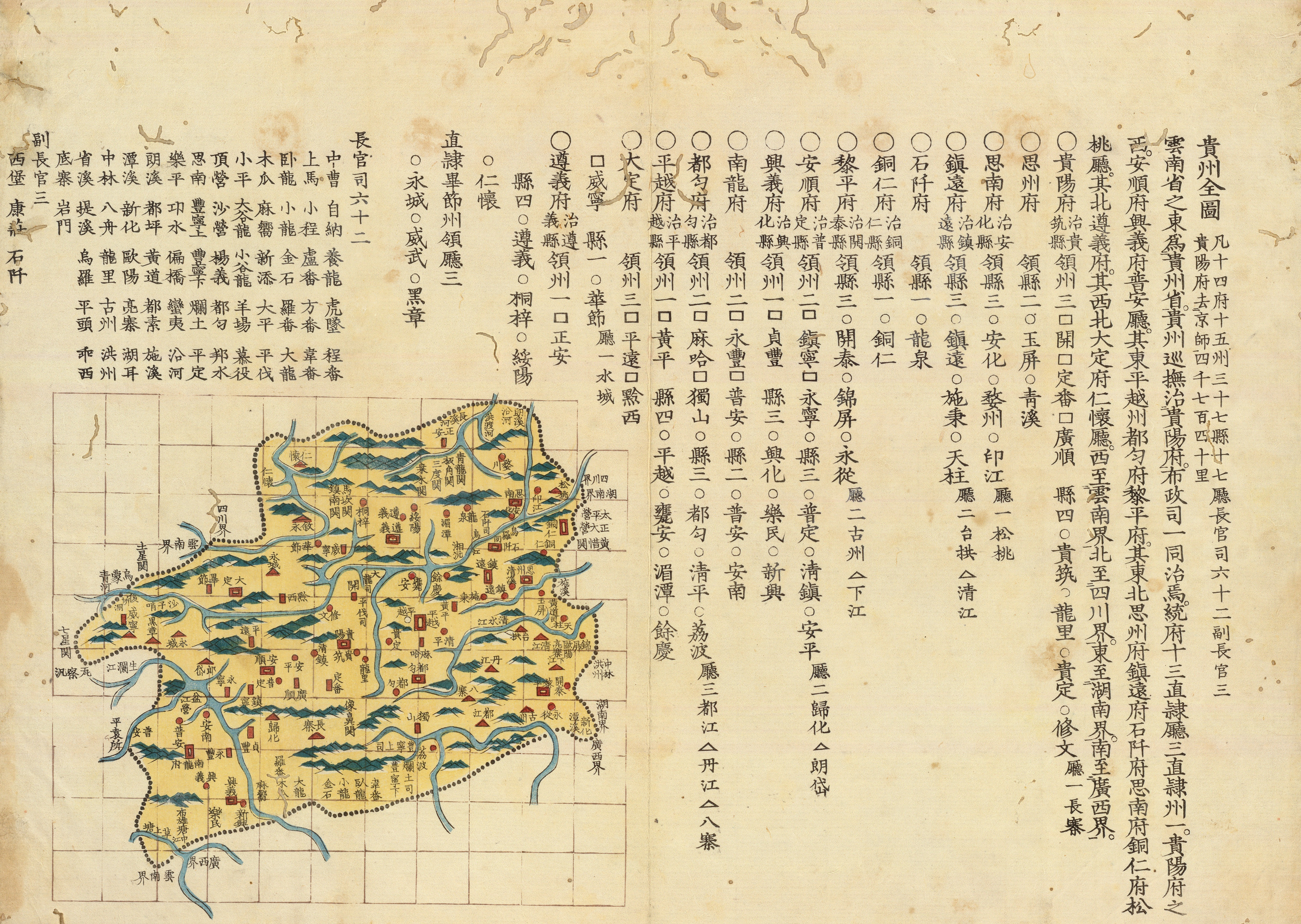
Map of Guizhou during Qing Dynasty

The Gaitu Guiliu policy in Qing China intensified class exploitation and ethnic oppression in Guizhou. This policy replaced tribal leadership with direct imperial control, allowing Qing officials and landlords to exploit Bouyei people. The tusi system, where hereditary leaders became Qing officials, further exacerbated the issue. Tusi landlords forced farmers to cultivate "stamp fields" for taxes and perform labor services. Feudal landlords, officials, and even soldiers also extorted the population. The White Lotus Sect originated during the Yuan Dynasty. Wang Nangxian along with Wang Cong'er led the uprising of the White Lotus sect against the Qing regime.

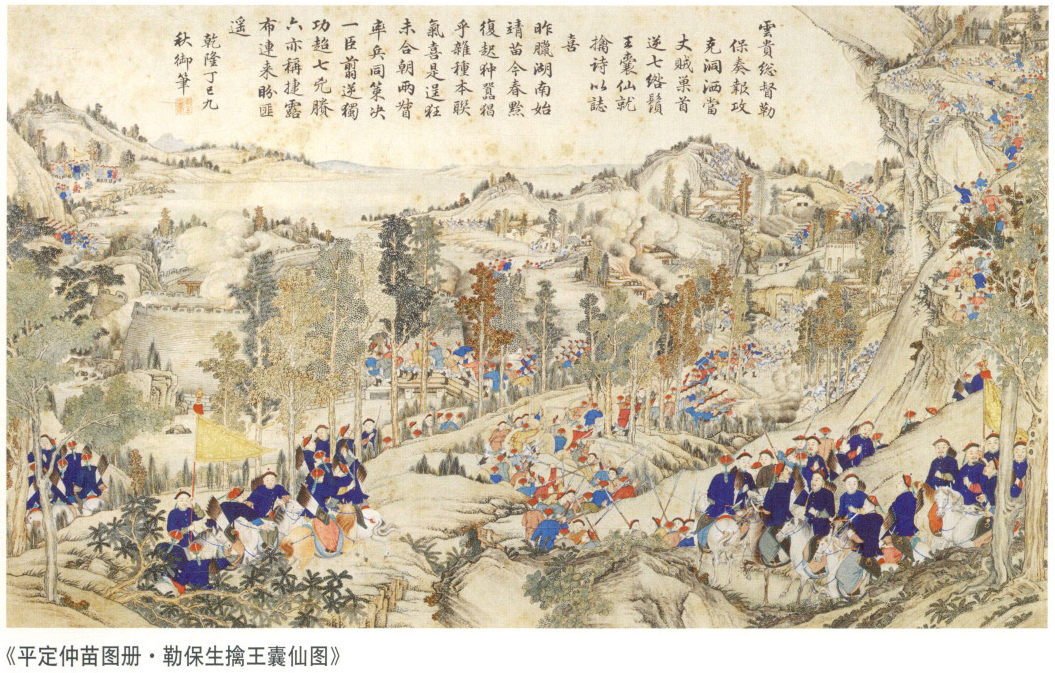
Capture of Wang Nangxian by the Qing Army (1797)

In January 1797, a massive uprising led by Wang began with thousands of rebels attacking cities, gaining momentum until they captured Puping and Nanlong, leading to the suicide of Prefect Cao Tingkui. By mid-February, the rebels had taken Ceheng, Zhenfeng, Xingren, and Xingyi, then moved towards Ziyun, Changshun, Huishui, and Zhijin, rallying local Bouyei, Zhuang, Yao, Miao, and Yi population to join them with sights set on capturing provincial capital Guiyang. Wang also reportedly used Kung Fu and acrobatics, and fought with a sword in each hand, and led an army of men into battle against the Qing army. Though Wang's peasant troops were at an obvious disadvantage, they overcame and surprised the Qing troops repeatedly by using guerrilla tactics. The contemporary records of the Qing Court stated that "the deadliest of all the rebels are those led by Madam Wang, wife of Qi" and "it is said that all the rebel factions from Hubei and Shanxi were stirred up by Wang".

Emperor Jiaqing dispatched troops to suppress the uprising and the rebellion weakened due to superior armaments of the Qing army. After the failed siege by rebels of Nanlong, the Qing response was swift; Governor-Generals Le Bao from Yunnan-Guizhou and Jiqing from Guangxi were dispatched. With 39 local militias formed by landlords, the rebels were pushed back. The siege of Nanlong ended in June and, by August 15, the government troops captured the Bouyei strongholds of Dongsa and Dangzhang. The rebels rose up to resist, wielding swords and spears to engage in hand-to-hand combat with the enemy. Both villages were breached, and the rebels ignited a raging fire and threw themselves into the sea of fire. According to the folk song "The Song of the Nanlong Resistance", Wang Nangxian led her troops into battle at Dongsa and achieved initial victory. However, the Qing army employed superior attacks, causing the rebel forces to crumble. Wang then disguised herself as a man to escape but was recognized by local militia. They seized the opportunity and captured her alive, delivering her to the Qing military camp. Another Bouyei folk epic about her presents a different account. In this version, the Qing army arrested Wang Nangxian's parents, luring her into the city. Wang Nangxian fought and killed several Qing soldiers before being captured while injured, although his account may not be entirely reliable. In summary, it is highly likely that Wang Nangxian was captured during the Battle of Dongsa.

Following her capture and other Bouyei military leaders by government troops, the Qing government put her in shackles, locked her in a prison car, and escorted her with heavy troops. They also ordered that whenever she passed through the prefectures and counties, the prefects and local military officers must "personally take over and receive her, to be cautious and careful." Every time she entered or left a province, the governor and provincial governor had to report the date of her entry and exit and the place of handover, which shows how much importance they attached to her. She was then taken to Beijing, tried, and on December 24, 1797, Wang Nangxian, at only twenty years old, was executed by lingchi. In the aftermath of the uprising, the villages were destroyed and the rebels' weapons melted down into a pillar near Jiaxu Tower in Guiyang as a warning. The Qing government renamed renamed Nanlong as Xingyi Prefecture. The uprising reflected the struggle of the Bouyei people and the broader resistance against Qing rule, and highlighted the deep-seated tensions and grievances that existed under Qing rule in areas populated by ethnic minorities. After Wang's death, the people of Nanlong all expressed their sorrow and set up incense tables in their homes for memorial ceremonies honoring her.

There are two conflicting accounts regarding whether Wang Nangxian possessed martial arts skills and participated in frontline combat. While neither the official report by Guangxi Governor Le Bao nor Wang Nangxian's own confession mentions her training in martial arts or her involvement in direct combat, folkloric accounts consistently portray her as a highly skilled martial artist who killed numerous enemies. The Xingyi Prefecture Gazette describes her commanding a siege while surrounded by female generals, and the Chinese Encyclopedia of Minority Nationalities states that she trained in martial arts from a young age. Recent domestic scholarly articles further assert that she fought bravely on the frontlines. Although it is plausible for a young woman to possess martial arts skills, given the context of her leading an armed uprising and her itinerant lifestyle, her primary role likely involved utilizing religion to mobilize the masses, boost morale, and inspire confidence, similar to the French heroine Joan of Arc.

== Legacy ==
In Bouyei folklore, Wang Nangxian is universally regarded as young and beautiful. Her appearance is vividly described in the Bouyei narrative poem Wang Xiangu:

Ah Cong (Wang Nangxian's childhood name) grew up as graceful as a flower...
Even more beautiful than camellias.
The bamboo leaves in the back garden are lovely,
But they cannot match the curve of Ah Cong's eyebrows.
The clear waters of the Panjiang River,
Cannot compare to the brightness of Ah Cong's eyes.

In present-day China, the Chinese Communist Party committee of Anlong County and the county government erected a statue honoring Wang Nangxian. On every March 3rd, Dongsa Village as well the Bouyei community still holds activities to worship and commemorate Wang.

== See also ==
- Wang Cong'er
