= Wang Cong'er =

Qing Dynasty rebel

Wang Cong'er (Chinese: 王聰兒; pinyin: Wáng Cōng'ér, c. 1777–1798) was a female Chinese leader of the anti-Manchu White Lotus Rebellion along with Wang Nangxian during the reign of the Qing dynasty.

== Life ==
Reportedly born in 1777, Wang Cong'er was a native of Xiangyang City.

=== White Lotus Sect ===
The White Lotus Sect originated during the Yuan dynasty. Wang Cong'er along with Wang Nangxian led the uprising of the White Lotus sect against the Qing regime. She reportedly used Kung Fu and acrobatics, and fought with a sword in each hand. Intent on avenging the death of her husband at the hands of the Qing, Wang led an army of men into battle against the Qing army. Though Wang's peasant troops were at an obvious disadvantage, they overcame and surprised the Qing troops repeatedly by using guerrilla tactics. The contemporary records of the Qing Court stated that "the deadliest of all the rebels are those led by Madam Wang, wife of Qi" and "it is said that all the rebel factions from Hubei and Shanxi were stirred up by Wang".

The Qing General Ming Liang eventually recruited local landlords to build forts and lock civilians inside whenever rebels were in the area, cutting off support from civilian sympathizers who were a key part of the rebels' supply chain. In 1798, the Qing forces, with an increased number of warriors, ambushed Wang Cong'er and her fighters in the mountains near Yunxi, Hubei. After thousands of her men were defeated, Wang was forced to retreat. With no escape route available, she reportedly jumped to her death. Despite being defeated, Wang Cong'er has been credited with creating a precedent for revolts against Chinese imperial rule.

== See also ==
- Wang Nangxian
