= Xiangyang =

Xiangyang 襄阳市 Siangyang, Siang-yang
- Prefecture-level city
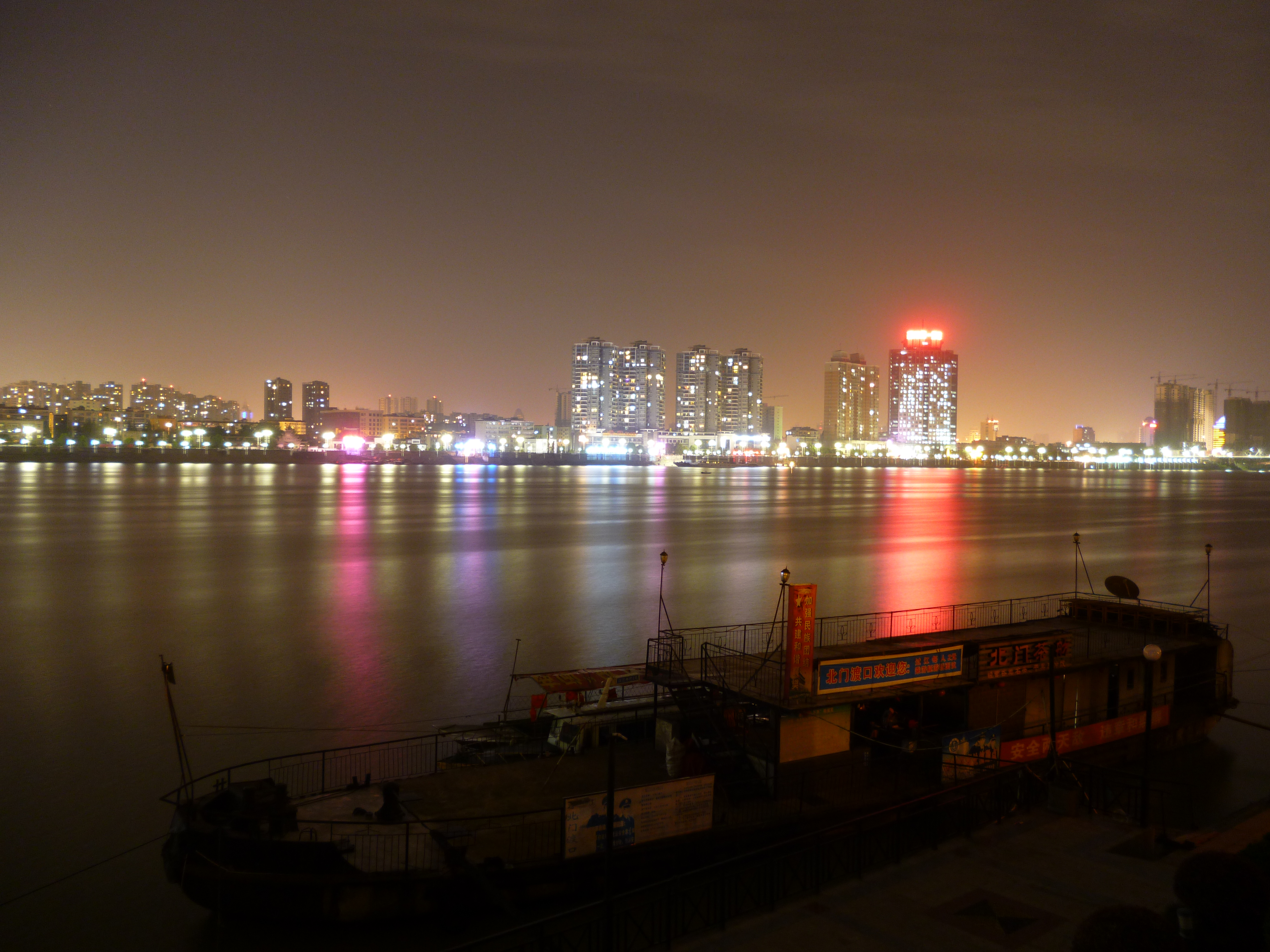
- Overlooking Fancheng District from Xiangcheng District on the other side of the Han River.

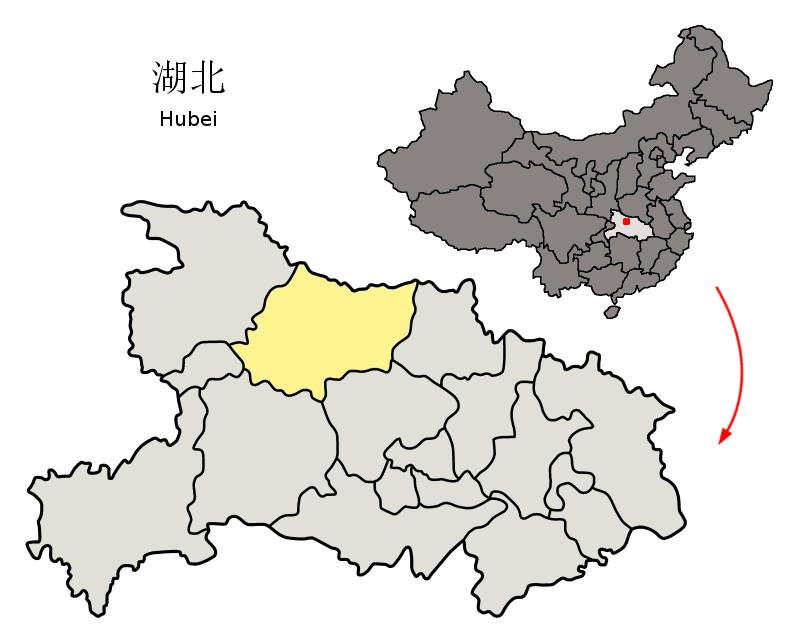
- Location of Xiangyang City jurisdiction in Hubei

- Location of the city centre in Hubei
- Coordinates (Xiangyang municipal government): 32°00′36″N 112°07′19″E
- Country: People's Republic of China
- Province: Hubei
- County-level divisions: 8
- Township-level divisions: 159
- Municipal seat: Xiangcheng District

Government
  - Mayor: Qie Yingcai

Area
  - Prefecture-level city: 19,724.41 km^{2} (7,615.64 sq mi)
  - Urban: 3,672.9 km^{2} (1,418.1 sq mi)
  - Metro: 3,672.9 km^{2} (1,418.1 sq mi)
- Elevation: 71 m (233 ft)

Population (2020 census)
  - Prefecture-level city: 5,260,951
  - Density: 266.7229/km^{2} (690.8090/sq mi)
  - Urban: 2,319,640
  - Urban density: 631.56/km^{2} (1,635.7/sq mi)
  - Metro: 2,319,640
  - Metro density: 631.56/km^{2} (1,635.7/sq mi)

GDP
  - Prefecture-level city: CN¥ 338.2 billion US$ 54.3 billion
  - Per capita: CN¥ 60,319; US$ 9,684
- Time zone: UTC+8 (China Standard)
- Postal code: 441000
- Area code: 710
- ISO 3166 code: CN-HB-06
- License Plate Prefix: 鄂F
- Website: xiangyang.gov.cn

Xiangyang
- "Xiangyang" written in Chinese
- Simplified Chinese: 襄阳
- Traditional Chinese: 襄陽
- Postal: Siangyang
Transcriptions
Standard Mandarin
- Hanyu Pinyin: Xiāngyáng
- Wade–Giles: Hsiang^{1}-yang^{2}

Xiangfan
- Chinese: 襄樊
- Postal: Siangfan
Transcriptions
Standard Mandarin
- Hanyu Pinyin: Xiāngfán
- Wade–Giles: Hsiang^{1}-fan^{2}

Xiangyang is the second-largest prefecture-level city by population in northwestern Hubei province, China. It was known as Xiangfan from 1950 to 2010. The Han River runs through Xiangyang's centre and divides the city north–south. The city itself is an agglomeration of two once separate cities: Fancheng and Xiangyang (or Xiangcheng), and was known as Xiangfan before 2010. What remains of old Xiangyang is located south of the Han River and contains one of the oldest still-intact city walls in China, while Fancheng is located to the north of the Han River. Both cities served prominent historical roles in both ancient and pre-modern Chinese history. Today, the city has been a target of government and private investment as the country seeks to urbanize and develop the interior provinces. Its built-up area made up of 3 urban districts had 2,319,640 inhabitants at the 2020 census while the whole municipality contained approximately 5,260,951 people.

== History ==
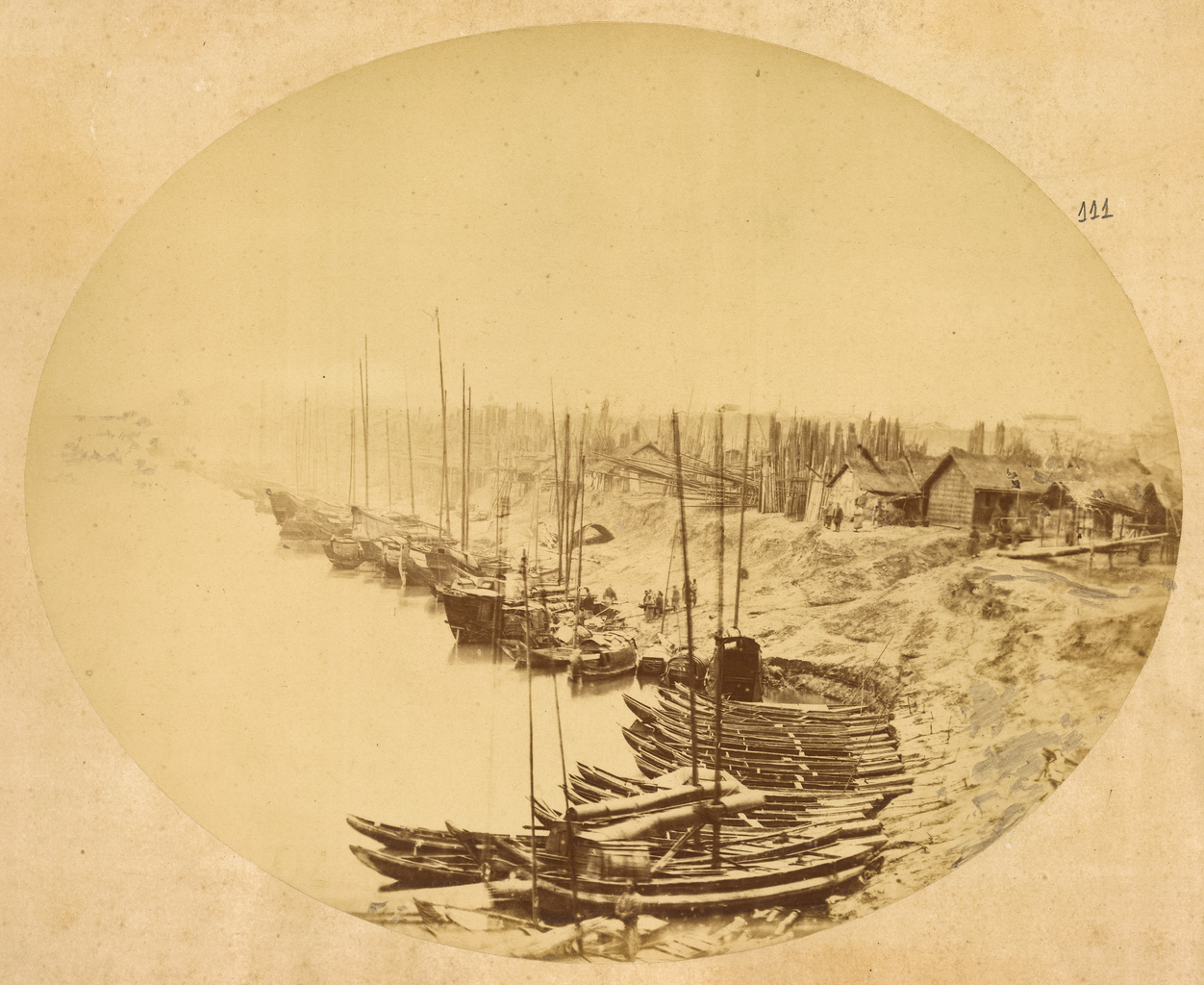
Han River near Fancheng, 1874

Xiangyang is located at a strategic site on the middle reaches of the Han River, and has witnessed several significant battles in Chinese history. Xiangyang County was first established at the location of modern Xiangcheng in the early Western Han dynasty and the name had been used continuously for more than 2,000 years until the 20th century.

In the final years of the Eastern Han dynasty, Xiangyang became the capital of Jing Province (ancient Jingzhou). The warlord Liu Biao governed his territory from here. Under Liu's rule, Xiangyang became a major destination of the northern elite fleeing warfare in the Central Plain. In the Battle of Xiangyang in 191 AD, Sun Jian, a rival warlord and the father of Sun Quan, founder of Eastern Wu, was defeated and killed. The area passed to Liu Bei after Liu Biao's death. Two decades later, Battle of Fancheng, one of the most important battles in late Han-Three Kingdoms period, was fought here, resulting in Liu Bei's loss of Jingzhou.

During the early years of the Jin dynasty, Xiangyang was on the frontier between Jin and Eastern Wu. Yang Hu, the commander in Xiangyang, was remembered for his policy of "border peace". Cross-border commerce was allowed, and the pressure on the Jin army was greatly relieved. Eventually, Xiangyang accumulated sufficient supplies for 10 years, which played a key role in Jin's conquest of Wu.

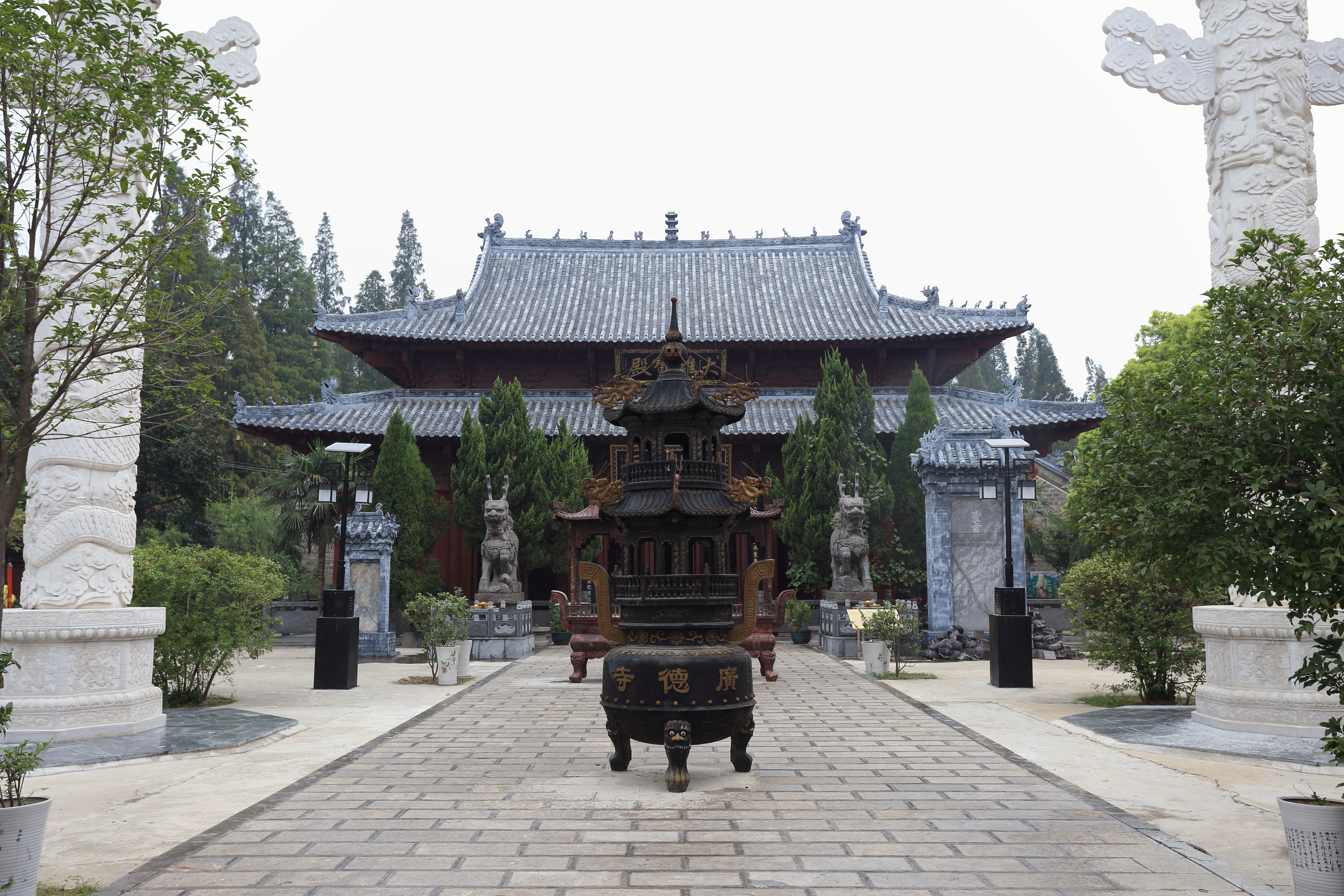
Guangde Temple, Xiangyang

In the Southern Song dynasty, after the Treaty of Shaoxing, Xiangyang became a garrison city on the northern frontier of Song. During Mongol conquest of the Song dynasty, Xiangyang together with Fancheng formed one of the greatest obstacles against the expansion of Mongol Empire. They were able to resist for six years before finally surrendering in the Siege of Xiangyang.

In 1796, Xiangyang was one of the centers of the White Lotus Rebellion against the Qing dynasty. Here, rebel leader Wang Cong'er successfully organized a rebel army of 50,000 and joined the main rebel forces in Sichuan. The revolt lasted for nearly 10 years and marked a turning point in the history of Qing dynasty.

In 1950, Xiangyang and Fancheng were merged to form Xiangfan City. In later 20th century, it became a major transport hub as Handan, Jiaoliu, and Xiangyu railways intersect in Fancheng. The city's current boundaries were established in 1983 when Xiangyang Prefecture was incorporated into Xiangfan City. The city was renamed to Xiangyang in 2010.

== Geography ==
Xiangyang has a latitude range of 31° 14'−32° 37' N, or 154 km (96 mi), and longitude range of 110° 45'−113° 43' E, or 220 km (137 mi), and is located on the middle reaches of the Hanshui, a major tributary of the Yangtze River. The urban area, however, has a latitude range of 31° 54'−32° 10' N, or 29 km (18 mi), and longitude range of 112° 00'−112° 14' E, or 21 km (13 mi). It borders Suizhou to the east, Jingmen and Yichang to the south, Shennongjia and Shiyan to the west, and Nanyang (Henan) to the north. Its administrative border has a total length of 1,332.8 km (828.2 mi).

=== Climate ===
Xiangyang has a monsoon-influenced, four season humid subtropical climate (Köppen Cfa), with cold, damp (but comparatively dry), winters, and hot, humid summers.

Climate data for Xiangyang, elevation 163 m (535 ft), (1991–2020 normals, extremes 1981–present)
Month	Jan	Feb	Mar	Apr	May	Jun	Jul	Aug	Sep	Oct	Nov	Dec	Year
Record high °C (°F)	21.8 (71.2)	23.6 (74.5)	32.8 (91.0)	34.0 (93.2)	37.4 (99.3)	38.0 (100.4)	39.6 (103.3)	39.0 (102.2)	39.3 (102.7)	37.7 (99.9)	27.7 (81.9)	21.7 (71.1)	39.6 (103.3)
Mean daily maximum °C (°F)	7.4 (45.3)	10.7 (51.3)	16.0 (60.8)	22.5 (72.5)	27.3 (81.1)	30.4 (86.7)	32.0 (89.6)	31.4 (88.5)	27.4 (81.3)	22.2 (72.0)	15.6 (60.1)	9.6 (49.3)	21.0 (69.9)
Daily mean °C (°F)	3.3 (37.9)	6.1 (43.0)	11.0 (51.8)	17.0 (62.6)	22.0 (71.6)	25.6 (78.1)	27.6 (81.7)	26.9 (80.4)	22.7 (72.9)	17.3 (63.1)	11.0 (51.8)	5.4 (41.7)	16.3 (61.4)
Mean daily minimum °C (°F)	0.1 (32.2)	2.5 (36.5)	7.0 (44.6)	12.7 (54.9)	17.7 (63.9)	21.8 (71.2)	24.3 (75.7)	23.6 (74.5)	19.2 (66.6)	13.7 (56.7)	7.4 (45.3)	2.0 (35.6)	12.7 (54.8)
Record low °C (°F)	−8.8 (16.2)	−7.9 (17.8)	−2.7 (27.1)	−0.1 (31.8)	8.4 (47.1)	12.6 (54.7)	17.2 (63.0)	14.9 (58.8)	10.5 (50.9)	0.0 (32.0)	−3.4 (25.9)	−6.8 (19.8)	−8.8 (16.2)
Average precipitation mm (inches)	22.4 (0.88)	25.4 (1.00)	44.3 (1.74)	64.9 (2.56)	98.9 (3.89)	107.3 (4.22)	132.4 (5.21)	137.1 (5.40)	83.0 (3.27)	68.3 (2.69)	40.3 (1.59)	16.4 (0.65)	840.7 (33.1)
Average precipitation days (≥ 0.1 mm)	5.8	7.4	8.9	9.7	11.0	10.2	11.9	11.1	10.0	10.0	8.1	5.9	110
Average snowy days	4.3	3.3	1.3	0	0	0	0	0	0	0	0.8	2.4	12.1
Average relative humidity (%)	71	70	70	71	71	76	81	80	76	74	74	71	74
Mean monthly sunshine hours	107.2	112.6	143.7	171.6	184.5	174.6	185.2	183.0	147.9	143.3	127.2	117.9	1,798.7
Percentage possible sunshine	33	36	38	44	43	41	43	45	40	41	41	38	40
Source: China Meteorological Administration all-time October record

== Administration ==
The prefecture-level city of Xiangyang administers 9 county-level divisions, including 3 districts, 3 county-level cities and 3 counties.

- Xiangcheng District (襄城区)
- Xiangzhou District (襄州区)
- Fancheng District (樊城区)
- Zaoyang City (枣阳市)
- Yicheng City (宜城市)
- Laohekou City (老河口市)
- Nanzhang County (南漳县)
- Gucheng County (谷城县)
- Baokang County (保康县)

These are further divided into 159 township-level divisions, including 106 towns, 29 townships and 24 subdistricts.

Map
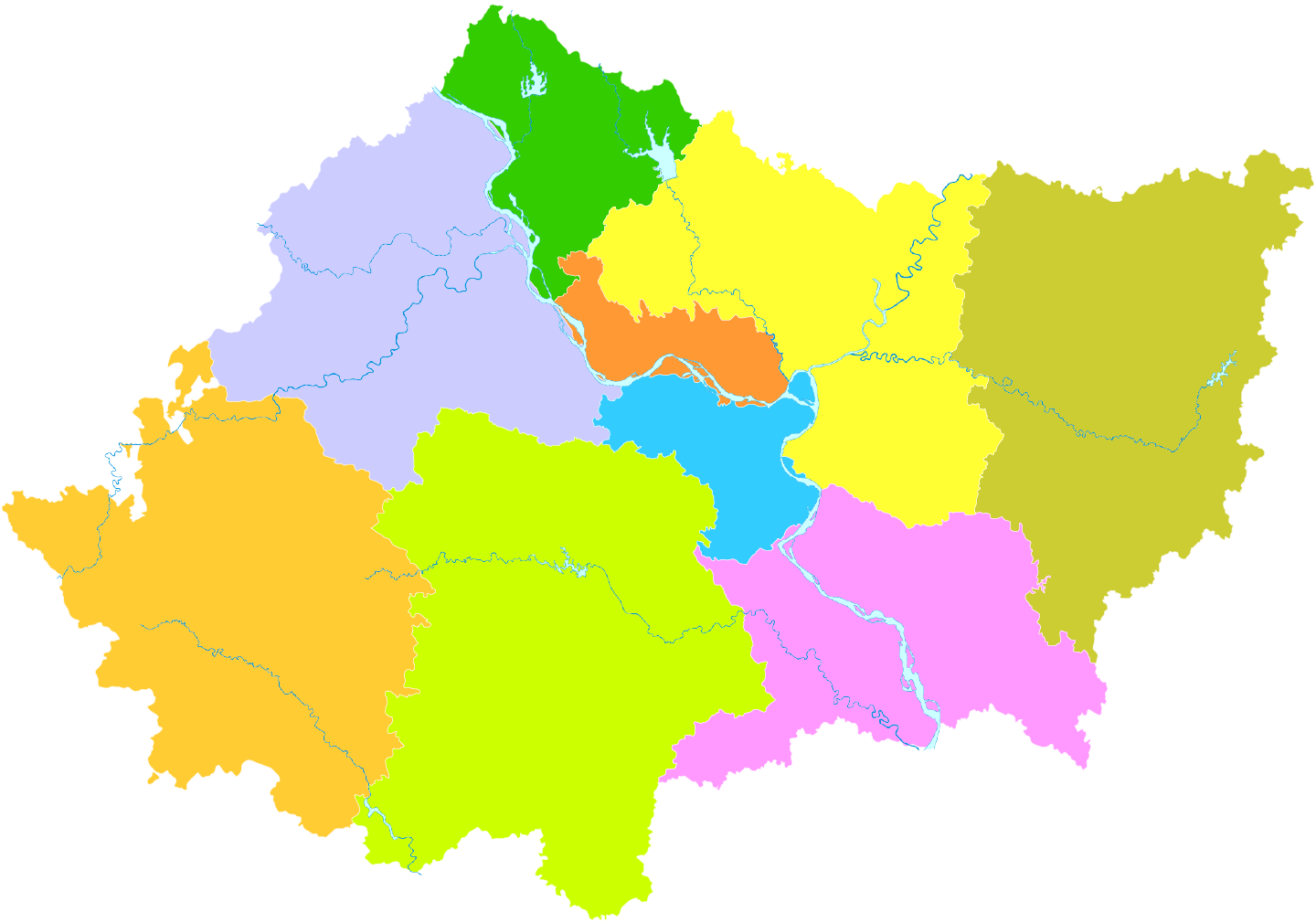

== Population ==
According to the Sixth National Population Census in 2010, as of November 1, Xiangyang had a resident population of 5,500,307. Males accounted for 50.61% and females 49.39%, with a sex ratio of 102.46 males per 100 females. By age, 0–14 years old made up 15.00%, 15–64 years old 76.51%, and 65 and above 8.49%. The city had 1,572,191 households with a total household population of 5,134,811.

According to the Seventh National Population Census in 2020 (data as of November 1, 2020), Xiangyang had a resident population of 5,260,951, a decrease of 239,356 from the Sixth Census in 2010, a decline of 4.35%. Males accounted for 50.59% and females 49.41%, with a sex ratio of 102.41. People aged 0–14 made up 17.43%, 15–59 years 61.87%, and 60 years and above 20.70%. The city had 1,810,009 households and 70,559 collective households, with 4,903,729 people in households and 357,222 in collective households. The urbanization rate was 61.66%, the population living separately from their household registration was 1,424,500, and the floating population was 822,900.

== Economy ==
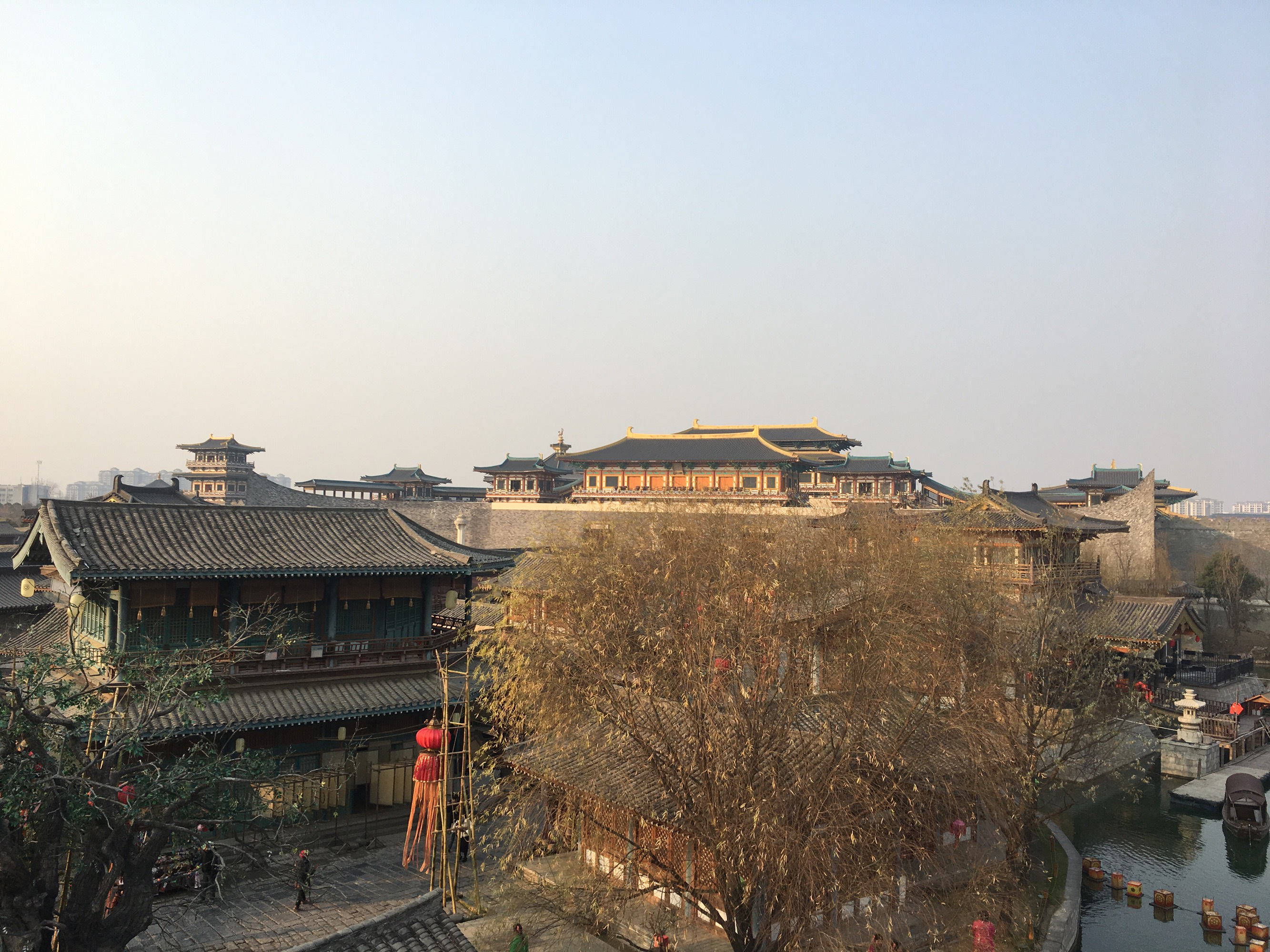
The Tang dynasty city film and television base in Xiangyang

Xiangyang possesses large water energy resources whilst its mineral deposits include rutile, ilmenite, phosphorus, barite, coal, iron, aluminum, gold, manganese, nitre, and rock salt. The reserves of rutile and ilmenite rank highly in China. Textile production is the mainstay industry of Xiangyang followed by machinery manufacture, chemical processing, electronics, and manufacture of construction materials. Agricultural resources are significant with Xiangyang's chief farm products including grain, cotton, vegetable oil crops, tobacco, tea and fruit. As the home of Dongfeng Motors, Xiangyang is a well known automobile hub and partners with foreign manufacturers to produce Nissan and Infiniti models for domestic sales. In addition, there are a number of chemical fibre enterprises in the city including Birla Jingwei Fibres, a member of the Aditya Birla Group. The city has also invested in many industrial, technology and clean energy parks.

=== Intelligent and Connected Vehicle Demonstration Zone ===
Xiangyang has established an Intelligent and Connected Vehicle (ICV) demonstration zone in the Xiangzhou District. This zone provides a testing ground for autonomous driving technologies, covering various road scenarios including highways, urban streets, and rural roads. It is a key project in the city's strategy to integrate into the "Beijing-Guangdong-Fujian" intelligent connected vehicle industry corridor.

== Hubei Free Trade Zone at Xiangyang ==
With a total planned area of 21.99 square km, Hubei Free Trade Zone at Xiangyang is one of the three Hubei Free Trade Pilot Zones, a national opening-up platform of free trade and national high-tech zone. It gives priority to high-end equipment manufacturing, new energy autos, big data, cloud computing, business logistics, inspection and testing.

== Transportation ==
Xiangyang is a railway junction for the Xiangyang-Chongqing (Xiangyu), Hankou-Danjiangkou (Handan), and Jiaozuo-Liuzhou (Jiaoliu) Railways. Xiangyang East railway station opened in 2019 and is connected to multiple high-speed lines. Three National Highways including Route 207 pass through the city. The Han River and four other rivers are open to commercial transport year-round. The Xiangyang Liuji Airport has commercial airline services to major cities throughout China including Beijing, Shanghai, and Guangzhou.

With Xiangyang-Ningbo Port International Sea-railway Combined Transportation, "Xiangyang-Wuhan-Europe" Central Europe Freight Trains, three-dimensional international logistics channels have been established. Economic ties with countries and areas along the "Belt and Road" are getting closer and closer.

== Culture ==
=== Cuisine ===
Xiangyang food culture represents the northern style of Hubei cuisine, blending flavors from north and south China, emphasizing fresh spiciness, braising or steaming, and the use of finishing oil. Among daily foods, Xiangyang beef noodles are the most iconic, featuring alkaline noodles served with rich beef and offal broth, braised beef, and red oil, often paired with local yellow wine, reflecting the region's flavor and culinary heritage. Street snacks and festival foods also convey local traditions and culture.

=== Art ===
Xiangyang Huagu Opera is a nationally recognized intangible cultural heritage performing art popular in the middle and upper reaches of the Han River in Hubei, as well as parts of southern Shaanxi and Henan. Listed in 2011 as a national-level intangible cultural heritage, it traces its origins to the Daoguang period of the Qing dynasty, evolving from local folk songs, dances, and storytelling performances. The opera features diverse vocal styles, including Taoqiang, Hanq iang, Siping, and Caiqiang, with the core accompanied by luogu (gong and drum) and later by stringed instruments such as gaohu and erhu. Known for its expressive singing, clear diction, and lively performance, Xiangyang Huagu Opera incorporates both comedic and serious roles. Traditional repertoire includes short urban plays like Selling White Cloth, Repairing a Jar, and Spring Outing, while modern works such as The Legend of Song Yu continue its evolution. The art form preserves the folk traditions of the Han River region and provides insight into the fusion of northern and southern Chinese operatic music.

== Gallery ==
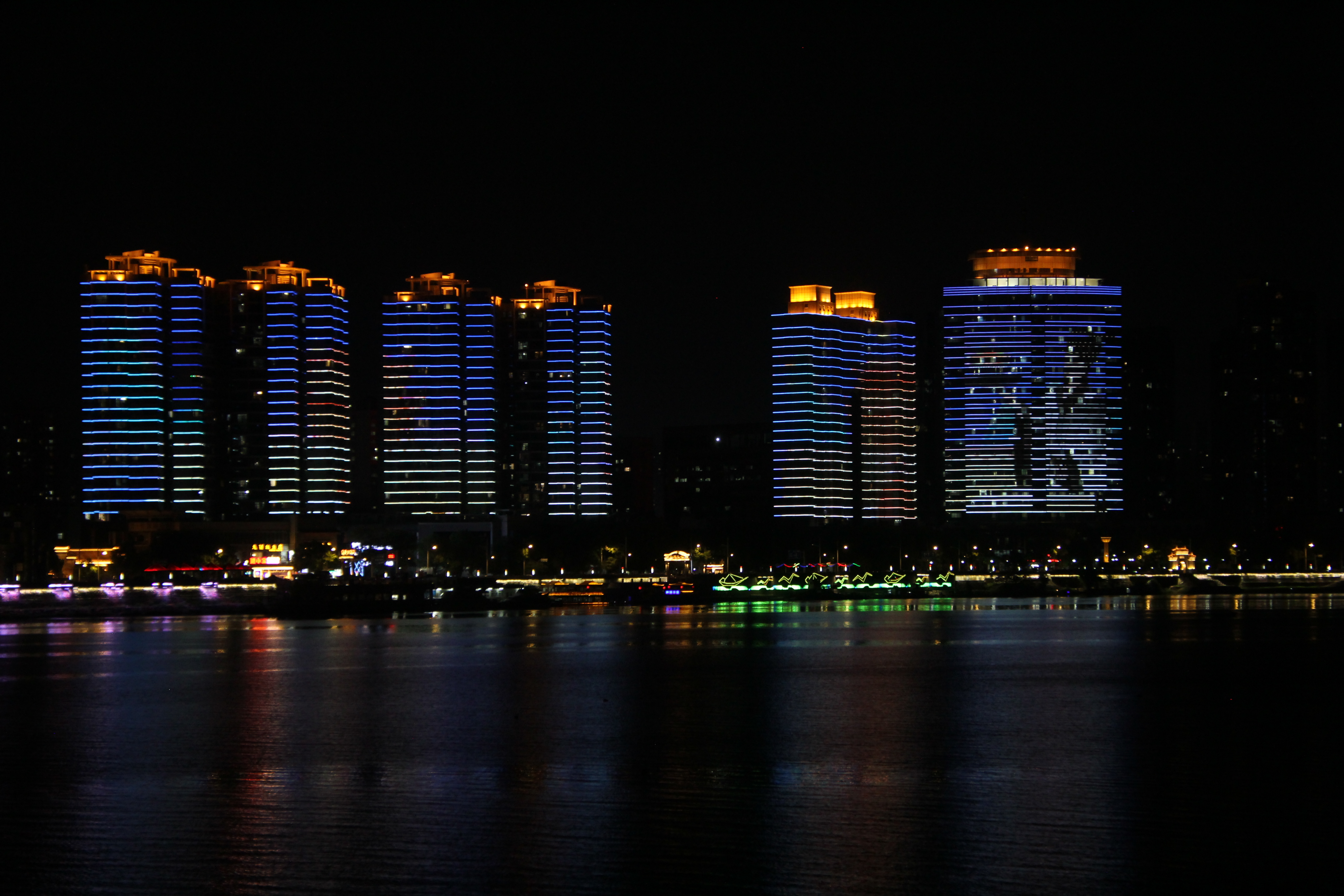
Xiangyang (Hubei) at night

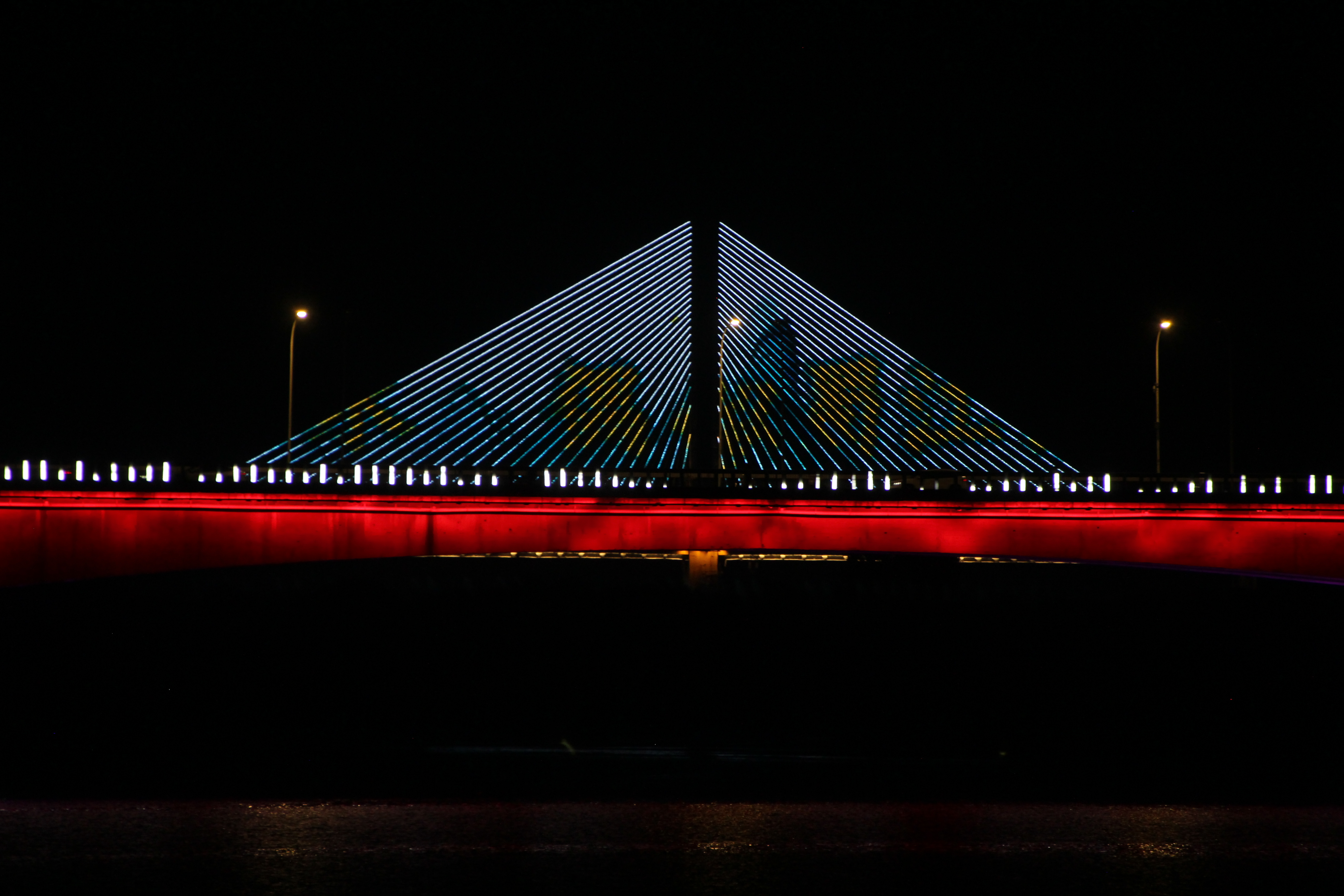
Wolong Bridge in Xiangyang (Hubei) at night

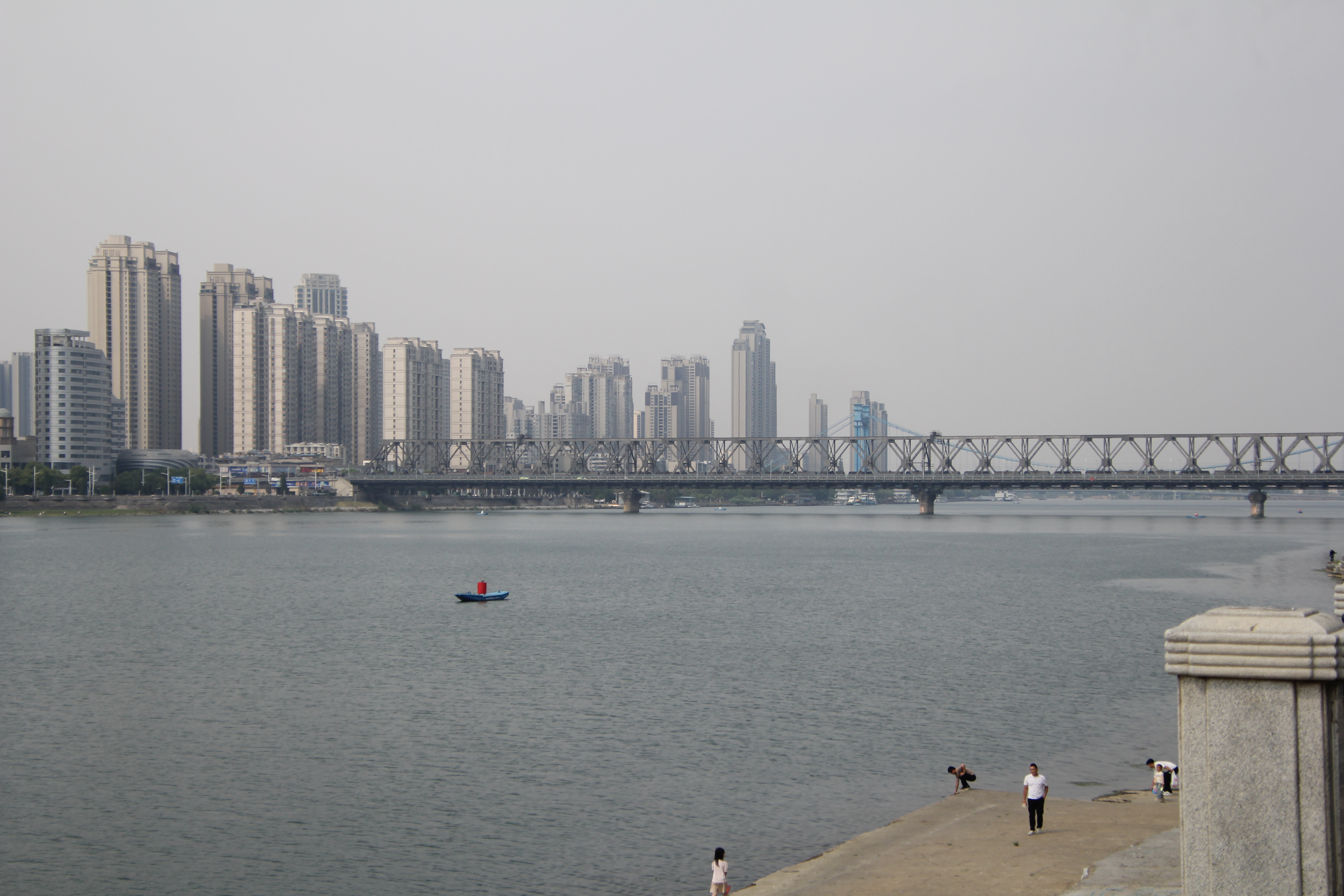
View of Changhong Bridge (Xiangyang, Hubei) passing Han river (汉江) during day

== See also ==
- Battle of Xiangyang
