= White Lotus Rebellion =

1794–1804 rebellion in China

- Part of Rebellions during the Qing dynasty
- White Lotus Rebellion and Qing army battle
Date	1794–1804
Location	Hubei, Shaanxi, Sichuan, Guizhou and surrounding regions
Result	Qing victory

Belligerents
Qing dynasty	White Lotus rebels

Commanders and leaders
Qianlong Emperor # Jiaqing Emperor; Fuk'anggan; Mingliang; Delengtai; Eldemboo	Qi Lin (executed); Wang Cong'er ‡‡ Yao Zhifu ‡‡ Wang Nangxian (executed); Xue Tiande †; Ran Tianyuan (executed)

Units involved
Eight Banners; Green Standard Army; Local militias	White Lotus rebel bands

Casualties and losses
Unknown	~100,000 killed

The White Lotus Rebellion (Chinese: 川楚白蓮教起義; pinyin: Chuān chǔ bái lián jiào qǐ yì, 1794–1804) was a rebellion initiated by followers of the White Lotus movement during the Qing dynasty of China. Motivated by millenarian Buddhists who promised the immediate return of the Buddha, it erupted out of social and economic discontent in the impoverished provinces of Hubei, Shaanxi, and Sichuan (including modern Sichuan and Chongqing). The rebellion began in 1794, when large groups of rebels claiming White Lotus affiliations rose up within the mountainous region that separated Sichuan province from Hubei and Shaanxi provinces. A smaller precursor to the main rebellion broke out in 1774, under the leadership of the martial-arts and herbal-healing expert Wang Lun in Shandong province of northern China.

Although the rebellion was finally crushed by the Qing government after eight years of fighting, it marked a sharp decline in the strength and prosperity of the Qing dynasty. The government had to depend on more Han Chinese recruits (Green Standard) since there were not enough Manchu. The rebellion was ended by the deaths of some 100,000 rebels.

== The White Lotus Society ==
The White Lotus Rebellion was initiated as an antitax protest led by the White Lotus Society, a secret religious society. The White Lotus Society is traditionally considered to have first appeared during the Jin dynasty founded by Huiyuan in Mount Lu, Jiujiang. The Red Turban Rebellion which took place in 1352, was led by the White Lotus group. By 1387, after more than 30 years of war, their leader, Zhu Yuanzhang conquered the North China Plain and occupied the Yuan capital Khanbaliq (present-day Beijing). Having attained the Mandate of Heaven and the status of Emperor, Zhu Yuanzhang named his period of reign "Hongwu" (thus he was known as the Hongwu Emperor) and founded a new dynasty – the Ming dynasty. The group later reemerged in the late 18th century in the form of an inspired Chinese movement.

Though many movements and rebellions were considered by imperial bureaucrats to have been led by White Lotus Society leaders, there is reason to doubt that the White Lotus Society had any organizational unity. Barend Joannes Ter Haar has argued that the term "White Lotus" was used primarily by Ming and Qing imperial bureaucrats to disparagingly explain a wide range of unconnected millenarian traditions, rebel movements, and popular religious practices. According to Ter Haar, it is clear that the "White Lotus" rebels of the uprisings that occurred between 1796 and 1804 did not voluntarily use the term "White Lotus" to refer to themselves or their movement. The term was only used by the millenarian rebels under intense pressure during government interrogations. It is only as historical sources look back upon these events do they began to summarize the various aspects of these uprisings as the "White Lotus rebellion."

== History ==
=== Wang Lun Uprising ===
In 1774, one instance of a derivative sect of the White Lotus, the Eight Trigrams arose in the form of underground meditation teachings and practice in Shandong province, not far from Beijing (Zhili) near the city of Linqing. The leader, herbalist and martial artist Wang Lun, led an uprising that captured three small cities and laid siege to the larger city of Linqing, a strategic location on the north-south Grand Canal transportation route.

Wang Lun likely failed because he did not make any attempts to raise wide public support. He did not distribute captured wealth or food supplies, nor did he promise to lessen the tax burden. Unable to build up a support base, he was forced to quickly flee all three cities that he attacked in order to evade government troops. Though he passed through an area inhabited by almost a million peasants, his army never measured more than 4,000 soldiers, many of whom had been forced into service.

=== White Lotus Rebellion ===
In 1796, a similar movement arose in the mountainous region that separated Sichuan province from Hubei and Shaanxi provinces in central China, initially as a tax protest. The White Lotus led impoverished settlers into rebellion, promising personal salvation in return for their loyalty. Beginning as tax protests, the eventual rebellion gained growing support and sympathy from many ordinary people. In January 1797, Wang Nangxian, a Mo ritual expert and Bouyei leader, led the Nanlong Uprising in the province of Guizhou culminating in defeat but cementing her status as a Bouyei folk hero in popular narratives like "The Immortal Lady Wang."

=== Suppression ===
The Qianlong Emperor (r. 1735–96) sent Helin (和琳, brother of Heshen) and Fuk'anggan to quell the uprising. Surprisingly, the ill-organized rebels managed to defeat the inadequate and inefficient Qing imperial forces. After both died in battle in 1796, the Qing government sent new officials, but none were successful. Only after 1800 did the Qing government adopt new tactics that established local militias (tuan) to help surround and destroy the White Lotus. The Qianlong emperor ordered that the Eight Banner armies, whether they had Manchu or Han banners, were not to be used to suppress internal uprisings, so the Qing mainly relied on the Han Chinese Green Standard Army and Han militias in order to suppress rebellions such as the White Lotus.

The Qing commanders who were sent to repress the rebellion had a difficult time putting down the White Lotus. The White Lotus bands mainly used guerrilla tactics, and once they disbanded, they were virtually indistinguishable from the local population. As one Qing official complained:

The rebels are all our own subjects. They are not like some external tribe ... that can be demarcated by a territorial boundary and identified by its distinctive clothing and language ... When they congregate and oppose the government, they are rebels; when they disperse and depart, they are civilians once more.

Without a clear enemy to fight against, brutality against civilians became more common. Due to their brutality, the Qing troops were soon nicknamed the "Red Lotus" Society.

A systematic program of pacification followed: the populace was resettled in hundreds of stockaded villages and organized into militias. In its last stage, the Qing suppression policy combined the pursuit and extermination of rebel guerrilla bands with a program of amnesty for deserters. In 1805, the imperial authorities suppressed the White Lotus Rebellion by instituting a combination of military and social policies. Approximately 7,000 Banner troops were sent in from Manchuria in combination with Green Standard Army soldiers from Guizhou and Yunnan as well as tens of thousands of local mercenaries.

A decree by the Daoguang Emperor admitted, "it was extortion by local officials that goaded the people into rebellion..." By threatening the arrest of people who engaged in sectarian activities, local officials and police extorted money from people. Consequently, a person's actual participation in sectarian activities had no impact on his or her arrest; what really mattered was whether monetary demands were met or not.

Administrators also seized and destroyed sectarian scriptures which were used by the religious groups. One such official was Huang Yupian (黃育楩), who refuted the ideas which were found in the scriptures which expressed orthodox Confucian and Buddhist views in A Detailed Refutation of Heresy (破邪詳辯 Pōxié Xiángbiàn), which was written in 1838. Since then, this book has become an invaluable source because it has enabled scholars to understand the beliefs of these groups.

The end of the White Lotus Rebellion in 1804 also brought an end to the myth of the military invincibility of the Manchus, contributing to the increasing frequency of rebellions in the 19th century. The White Lotus continued to be active, and it might have influenced the next major domestic rebellion, the Eight Trigrams uprising of 1813.

Throughout the 1820s and 1830s, the area of the boundary between Henan and Anhui was perpetually plagued by White Lotus revolts, the White Lotus rebels were frequently in league with the area's brigands and salt smugglers. Other White Lotus spinoffs include the Eight Trigrams, the Tiger Whips, and the Yihequan (Boxers).

== Legacy ==
The tide of the rebellion was turned by Qing leaders relying on the local gentry-raised private militias of Hunan, Hubei and Shaanxi. The experience of suppressing the rebellion led to improvement in the organization and training of the militia, as many of their leaders wrote extensively on mobilization, enlistment and local defense methods. These militia groups were later instrumental in defeating the Taiping rebellion.

Forty-eight years later, Zeng Guofan, leader of Hunan-based Xiang Army studied the Qing government's methods during the White Lotus Rebellion and he was inspired by them while he was considering ways to suppress the Taiping Rebellion.

== Rebel leaders ==
- Early: Qi Lin (Chinese: 齊林; pinyin: Qí Lín)
- Early: Qi Wangshi (Chinese: 齊王氏; pinyin: Qí Wángshì)
- Early: Wang Cong'er (Chinese: 王聰兒; pinyin: Wáng Cōng'ér), and Wang Nangxian (Chinese: 王囊仙; pinyin: Wáng Nángxiān)
- Middle: Xue Tiande (Chinese: 徐天德; pinyin: Xú Tiāndé)
- Late: Ran Tianyuan (Chinese: 冉天原; pinyin: Rǎn Tiānyuán)
