= Mao Ziyuan =

Pure Land monk during the Song dynasty

Mao Ziyuan (Chinese: 茅子元, c. 1096–1166) also known by his Dharma name Cizhao (慈照) was a Chinese Buddhist monk who founded a popular Pure Land Buddhist community known as the White Lotus School (bailian-zong 白蓮宗, also known as 白蓮菜 White Lotus Vegetarians) during the Song dynasty. Originating in Kunshan, Jiangsu province, Mao Ziyuan's teachings gained widespread popularity, especially among lay practitioners. Mao's White Lotus School became the model for the numerous later White Lotus Societies that arose throughout Chinese imperial history.

== Life ==
Mao Ziyuan lost his parents at a young age and became a monk at the age of nineteen, joining Yanxiang Temple in Wu Prefecture (in modern Jiangsu). Under the guidance of master Jingfan of the Tiantai school, he studied śamatha-vipaśyanā and Tiantai Pure Land practices. During the Shaoxing era (1131–1166) of the Southern Song dynasty, Mao Ziyuan constructed the White Lotus Repentance Hall on the shores of Dianshan Lake, near modern-day Qingpu District, Shanghai. He adopted the title "White Lotus Teacher" (白蓮導師) and synthesized Tiantai methods with Pure Land Buddhism, using many visual aids to make Buddhist teachings more accessible to laypersons.

The school emphasized the veneration of Amitābha Buddha and the practice of the five precepts: refraining from killing, stealing, indulgence, harmful speech, and alcohol. Mao Ziyuan also compiled important liturgical texts, including The Morning Repentance Rituals of the Lotus School (白蓮晨朝懺儀), several four-line gāthās, and five-syllable Buddha invocation chants. The school focused on simple rites and practices which were well suited for laypersons, such as simple recitation of the Buddha's name (nianfo) and good ethical behavior. The society was open to men and women equally. They also emphasized vegetarianism and held vegetarian feasts. Mao's organization also allowed laypersons to become teachers and leaders of the school's halls. This eventually developed into a system of married clergy that lasted well after Mao's death.

Mao Ziyuan's diagrams and liturgies were crafted to ensure that even individuals with limited education or resources could comprehend and adopt its teachings. His methods resonated particularly with rural communities, where villagers and farmers enthusiastically embraced his vision. By offering a straightforward yet profound system of practice, Mao's teachings spread widely and fostered significant engagement with Pure Land Buddhism among the lower strata of society. This approach resonated with both rural and urban communities, leading to the spread of White Lotus groups and halls throughout numerous provinces.

Despite its growing popularity, the White Lotus School faced opposition from authorities. Its simplicity and accessibility made it appealing to common people, but this also raised suspicions of hererodoxy. Accused of improper behavior and even "demonic" practices, Mao Ziyuan was exiled to Jiujiang in Jiangxi Province. Nevertheless, his teachings continued to spread clandestinely, and his followers, known as "White Lotus Vegetarians" (白蓮素食徒), remained dedicated to the Lotus path. White Lotus practitioners were allowed to marry and maintain secular lives, which differentiated the school from more traditional Buddhist schools which focused on monastic life. Wealthy adherents often supported public works such as the construction of roads, bridges, and temples, cementing the school's role in both religious and civic life.

Mao Ziyuan was eventually pardoned and allowed to return by the emperor. In his later years, he was summoned to the imperial palace, where he expounded on Pure Land Buddhism and was granted the title "Lotus School Master of Pure Karma and Compassion." He died in 1166, leaving a significant literary legacy, including works such as Ten Warnings for Pure Land Practice and Essentials of Amitabha. A stupa was constructed for his remains after his death.

== Influence and later developments ==
After Mao Ziyuan's death, the White Lotus School continued to thrive in Southern China. The leader of the school after Mao's death was known as "Little Mao Sheli" and he was a married priest who spread the school's teaching even wider. The school's emphasis on lay participation and lay leadership fostered the establishment of private temples, which became vital community hubs. The prominence that laypersons had in the movement and the mixing of men and women in it also led to criticism from Tiantai scholars like Zhipan.

During the Yuan dynasty (1271–1368) the school continued to grow in popularity. This alarmed the imperial house. In the first year of Emperor Wuzong's reign (1308), an edict ordered the “prohibition of the White Lotus Society, the destruction of its shrines, and the registration of its adherents”. However, thanks to the defense of the sect's legitimacy by figures such as Pu Du (1255-1330) of Donglin Temple on Mount Lu, who authored the apologetic Precious Mirror of the Lotus Tradition at Mount Lu, and the efforts of other prominent members, its legal status was briefly restored. The fact that an abbot of the famous Pure Land temple of Donglin-si, Pu Du, considered himself a member of the "White Lotus Tradition of Mount Lu" and saw Mao Ziyuan as a "patriarch" of this school, shows the influence that the movement had reached during this time. Mao Ziyuan remained a respected figure in later Chinese Pure Land Buddhism. Ming and Qing dynasty Pure Land texts continue to refer to him with reverence as "Master Cizhao".

During the Yuan, some elements of the White Lotus Sect transitioned to operating in secrecy. This persecution period also led to changes in its doctrines, which became tools for rallying and organizing peasant resistance against the ruling Mongol led authorities. This eventually culminated in the widespread peasant uprisings of the late Yuan Dynasty. During this period of persecution and political resistance, parts of the White Lotus School incorporated numerous folk beliefs, as well as millenarian and political elements. Believers anticipated the descent of Amitābha Buddha or the Bodhisattva Maitreya as a redeemer of humanity and savior from the Mongol Yuan dynasty oppressors. As such, White Lotus societies became associated with uprisings against local governments, contributing to the eventual fall of the Yuan dynasty. Leaders such as Han Shantong, Liu Futong, and Xu Shouhui spearheaded these movements, which sought to usher in an era of divine intervention.

== Teaching ==
Drawing on Tiantai and Pure Land Buddhism, Mao developed various illustrated diagrams as an aid to Pure Land practice such as the Buddha Selection Diagram of the Three Contemplations of the Four Lands in Perfect Interfusion (Yuanrong Sito Sanguan Xuanfotu, 圓融四土三觀選佛圖). The Diagram of the Four Lands is a visual representation designed to dispel confusion and illustrate the theories of the pure land. Through these diagrams, he aimed to summarize the boundless Dharma teachings in a concise and accessible manner, helping practitioners align their minds with Pure Land principles. Mao Ziyuan also made use of analogies, illustrations, and four line verses in vernacular poetic style to transmit his teachings. His teachings were deeply rooted in Tiantai philosophy and Pure Land thought, yet presented in a language that was easy to understand for commoners.

Mao's Buddha Selection Diagram draws on the Tiantai school's schema of four types of Pure Land: The Land Where Ordinary Beings and Sages Coexist, The Land of Expedient Liberation, The Land of True Reward and Adornment and The Land of Eternally Quiescent Light. His teachings emphasized the inseparability and mutual interfusion (yuanrong) of the Four Lands, asserting that distinctions between these levels of the pure land exist in appearance but not in essence. Mao stated that “the Four Lands are one land,” emphasizing the indivisible unity of the Pure Land and the inherent enlightenment of the One Mind, the Buddha-Mind. Using the metaphor of different kinds of light for different aspects of the pure land, Mao describes the Land Where Ordinary Beings and Sages Coexist as follows:

For this land, one only needs faith, vows, and Buddha-recitation. Without cutting off afflictions, renouncing family ties, or practicing meditative concentration, at the moment of death, Amitabha Buddha will come to guide them. All will be reborn in the Pure Land, gain supernatural powers, and attain non-retrogression, progressing directly to Buddhahood. The Land Where Both Saints and Ordinary Beings Reside is both self-beneficial and beneficial to others. It is illuminated by all three lights [sun, moon, and stars], encompassing all Four Lands and the nine grades of rebirth. By principle, the higher three lands are all contained within it and do not exist separately. However, the Master specifically highlights rebirth through the lowest grade to illustrate its accessibility. The other grades of rebirth vary based on each practitioner’s faith, vows, and cultivation.

In this quote, the lights of the sun, moon and stars are metaphors for the other three lands, indicating that the first and easiest land to attain contains all lands. By emphasizing the inclusion of all lands within the first, and the interfusion of the Four Lands, Mao ensured that the White Lotus path remained inclusive and accessible to practitioners of all levels. In this system, even the simplest and least ethical practitioner could attain all levels of the pure land by attaining birth in the Land Where Both Saints and Ordinary Beings Reside.

Mao also drew on the Tiantai doctrine of the "Three Thousand Realms in a Single Thought". Mao's perspective aligns with the idea that Amitabha Buddha is intrinsic to one's mind and that the Pure Land can be realized through awakening to one's true nature (buddha-nature) by relying on the Buddha's power.

== Works ==
Mao Ziyuan's main works include:

- The Morning Ritual of the Lotus School《蓮宗晨朝懺儀》
- The Buddha Selection Diagram of the Four Pure Lands and the Three Contemplations《圓融四土三觀選佛圖》
- The Collection of Going to the West《西行集》
- The Essentials of Amitabha 《彌陀節要》
- The Hundred Verses of the Lotus Sutra for Attaining the Way 《法華百心證道歌》
- The Collection of Wind and Moon《風月集》
- Ten Admonitions for the Pure Land《淨土十門告誡》

Many of his teachings are also found in the later Precious Mirror of the Lotus Tradition at Mount Lu of the Yuan era monk Pudu.

== Sources ==
- Haar, Barend ter. 1992. White Lotus Teachings in Chinese Religious History. Leiden: E.J. Brill.
