= Xiangcheng, Xiangyang =

Xiangcheng 襄城区
- District

- Location in Hubei
- Coordinates (XIangcheng District government): 32°00′40″N 112°08′02″E
- Country: China
- Province: Hubei
- Prefecture-level city: Xiangyang

Area
  - Total: 173 km^{2} (67 sq mi)

Population (2020 census)
  - Total: 475,611
  - Density: 2,750/km^{2} (7,120/sq mi)
- Time zone: UTC+8 (China Standard)
- Website: www.xfxc.gov.cn

Xiangcheng District (simplified Chinese: 襄城区; traditional Chinese: 襄城區; pinyin: Xiāngchéng Qū) is a district and the seat of the city of Xiangyang, Hubei province, China.

== History ==
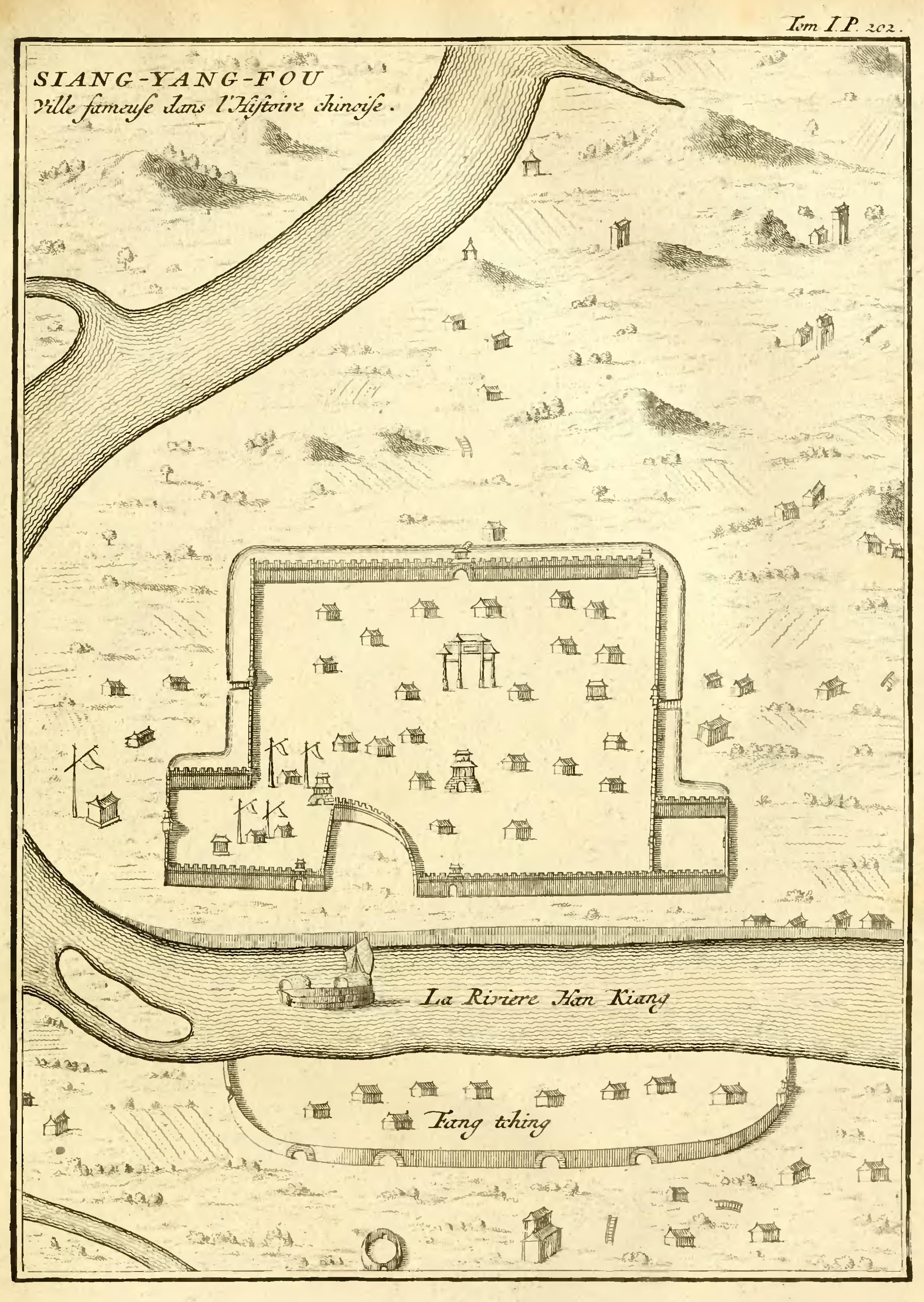
"Siang-yang-fou" in Du Halde's 1736 Description of China, based on reports from the Jesuit China missions but reversing the positions of Xiangyang and Fancheng.

Xiangcheng District is the location of the old urban core of Xiangyang, south of the Han River.

== Administrative divisions ==
Xiangcheng District administers 6 subdistricts, 2 towns and 1 township:

6 subdistricts

- Zhenwushan Subdistrict (真武山街道), Gucheng Subdistrict (古城街道), Panggong Subdistrict (庞公街道), Tanxi Subdistrict (檀溪街道), Longzhong Subdistrict (隆中街道), Yujiahu Subdistrict (余家湖街道)

2 towns

- Oumiao (欧庙镇), Wolong (卧龙镇)

1 township

- Yinji Township (尹集乡)

Former subdistricts:

- Wangfu Subdistrict (王府街道), Zhaoming Subdistrict (昭明街道)
