= Da'an (monk) =

Buddhist Monastic Abbot

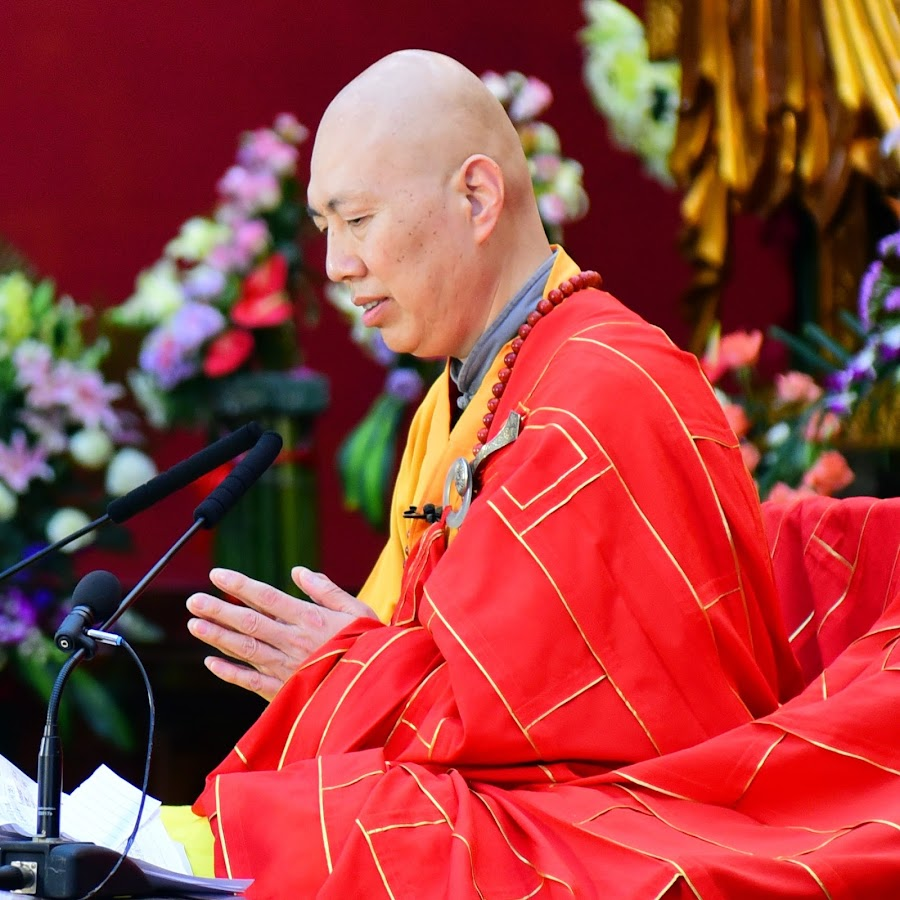
- Title: Abbot (Buddhism)

Personal life
- Born: Nanchang, Jiangxi

Religious life
- Religion: Buddhism
- School: Pure Land Buddhism
- Teachers: Chuanyin

Master Da'an (大安; pinyin:Dà'ān) is a Chinese Buddhist monk and the current abbot of Donglin Monastery.

== About ==
Born in 1959 in Nanchang, Jiangxi Province, Da'an was a guest professor at the Chinese Buddhist Academy and a professor at the University of International Business and Economics before ordaining under Venerable Chuanyin in September 2001. As the Abbot of Donglin Monastery, he was in charge of and was actively involved in the construction of the Donglin Grand Buddha, the world's tallest gold-plated bronze statue of Amitabha Buddha.

Da'an is known for practicing and propagating the Pure Land teachings and is capable of using modern scientific theories such as string theory and converging them with Pure Land teachings. Da'an has travelled to numerous countries such as United States of America, Canada, Malaysia, Indonesia and Singapore to give Dharma talks on Pure Land Buddhism and to conduct Buddhist ceremonies such as the Three Refuges and Five Precept Ceremony, Brahma Net Sutra Bodhisattva Precepts Ceremony and Amitabha-recitation retreats.

Da'an uses the Five Pure Land Sutras and One Sastra and the works of the Pure Land school's patriarchs as the foundation of his teaching with strong advocation on the parallel importance of both understanding and practice.

=== Exposure to Buddhism ===
When he was young, Da'an used to defame Buddhism, considering it to be outdated and pessimistic. However, after being gravely ill and hospitalized for a period of time, he started to deeply consider about the evanescence of life and explored various types of religions before finding that Buddhism, particularly Pure Land Buddhism could resolve the issue of life and death and was the best path he was looking for.

=== Bhikkhu Ordination ===
According to an article in the 83th Volume of "Shi Cheng Chao Yin, Dharmawave", a published newsletter of The Singapore Buddhist Lodge, Da'an had a strong thought of ordaining as a Buddhist monk in 2001 during his 1 million Buddha-recitation solitary retreat at a temple in Hubei which he initially suppressed in 1991 due to strong opposition from his family. However, on the last day of the retreat, the thought of ordination was so strong that he wrote two notes, "to ordain" or "not to ordain" and decided to kowtow and draw lots before the Buddha. He decided to draw the lot three times to determine whether he should ordain as a monk or not and he managed to draw the ordination lot four times (fourth time was to seek confirmation) in a row. Resulting in his strengthened resolve to renounce the household life.

Having recount the story to a Venerable from Jiuhua Mountain who found it strange, the Venerable asked Da'an to demonstrate what he did and got the same lot for the fifth time. Believing it to be Amitabha Buddha's power through the recitation of His name, Da'an left the household life smoothly and ordained as a monk in September 2001 under Venerable Chuanyin who received the Dharma transmission of the Weiyang lineage from Venerable Master Xu Yun.

Entrusted by Venerable Chuanyin, he oversaw the operations of Donglin Monastery and the construction of Donglin Grand Buddha, and took over the abbotship on Amitabha Buddha's birthday in 2011.

=== Notable Events ===
In 2005, Da'an was invited to Singapore to propagate the Pure Land Dharma, by teaching and demonstrating the integration of both Buddhist theories and practice.

In March 2010, Da'an visited the City of Ten Thousand Buddhas at California to give Pure Land Lectures on "Rebirth in the Pure Land Shastra by Vasubandhu Bodhisattva".

On 13 May 2014 (Vesak Day), Da'an presided over the Buddha Bathing Ceremony, transmitted the Three Refuges and Five Precepts and gave a Dharma talk on "Sutra of the Past Vows of Kṣitigarbha Bodhisattva” held at the Singapore EXPO.

On 5 to 8 September 2015, Da'an conducted Dharma lectures on "The Profound Meaning of the Sutra of the Past Vows of Kṣitigarbha Bodhisattva" and "The Chapter on the Perfect Penetration of Great Strength Bodhisattva in the Shurangama Sutra" at San Francisco Bay Area's The Bodhi Way Association.

On 3 to 5 September 2016, Da'an was invited to Canada's Buddhist Prajna Temple to lead a 3-day Amitabha-recitation retreat.

On 22 July 2018, the Nepal-China Executive Council (NCEC) donated a 200 kg bronze statue of the Indian Tripitaka Master Buddhabhadra to Donglin Monastery, of which NCEC's Chairman Anoop Ranjan Bhattarai and Da'an, the Abbot jointly unveiled it during the statue handover ceremony.

In 2024, Da'an was one of the Venerable Masters invited to give Dharma talks at The Singapore Buddhist Lodge as part of their 90th Anniversary Celebration Dharma activities. On 9 to 11 September 2024, Da'an and his entourage of Venerables from Donglin Monastery was invited to conduct and confer the Bodhisattva Precepts to lay devotees at The Singapore Buddhist Lodge. During which, Da'an was the Chief Preceptor (Sila Upadhyaya) to over 400 devotees who participated in the Ceremony.

In 2025, The Singapore Buddhist Lodge's president, Mr Tan Lee Huak visited Donglin Monastery to present a Letter of Invitation to Da'an, inviting him to be a Religious Advisor of The Singapore Buddhist Lodge.
