= Lushan Huiyuan =

Chinese Buddhist teacher (334–416)

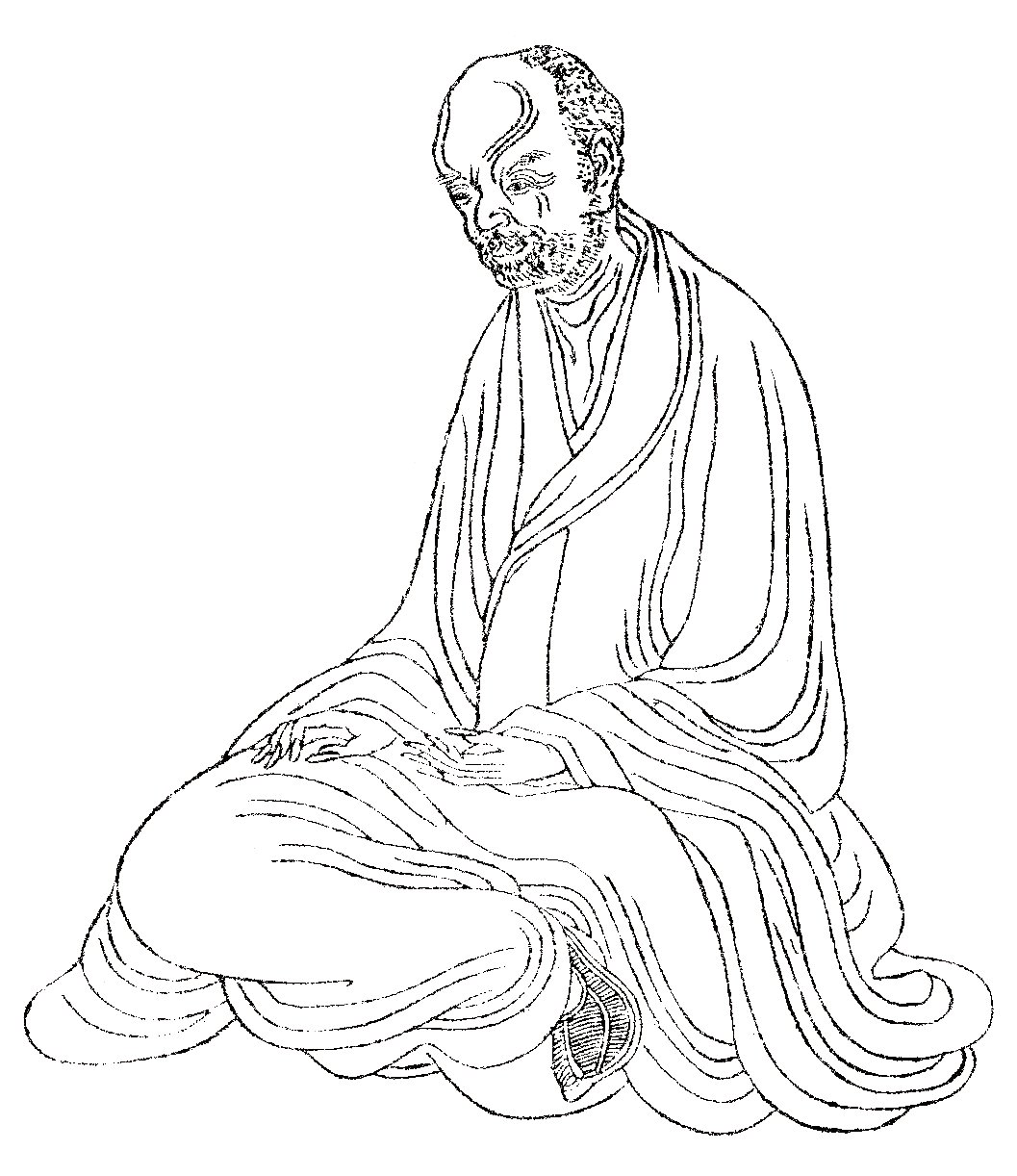
Huiyuan

Lushan Huiyuan (simplified Chinese: 庐山慧远; traditional Chinese: 廬山慧遠; pinyin: Lúshān Huìyuǎn; Wade–Giles: Lushan Hui-yüan; 334–416 AD), meaning "Huiyuan of Mount Lu", was a Chinese Buddhist teacher who founded Donglin Temple at the foot of Mount Lu in Jiujiang city region and wrote the text On Why Monks Do Not Bow Down Before Kings in 404 AD. He was born in Shanxi province but moved to Jiujiang, where he died in 416. Although he was born in the north, he moved south to live within the bounds of the Eastern Jin Dynasty.

Huiyuan was posthumously named First Patriarch of the Pure Land School of Buddhism, and founder of the White Lotus Society, an early Buddhist community devoted to Amitabha Buddha. His disciples included Huiguan (慧觀), Sengji (僧濟), and Faan (法安).

== Life ==
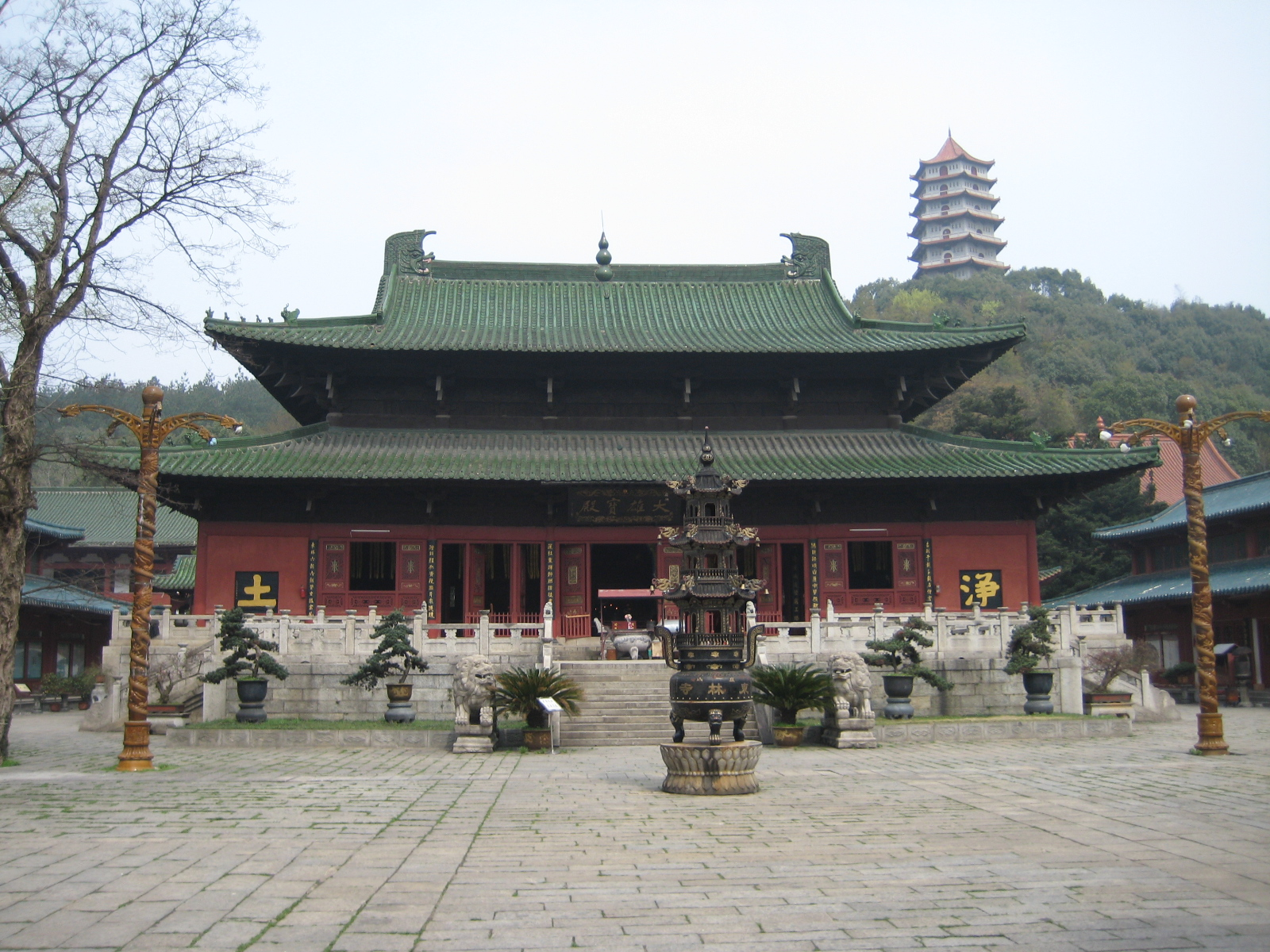
Donglin Temple at Mount Lu

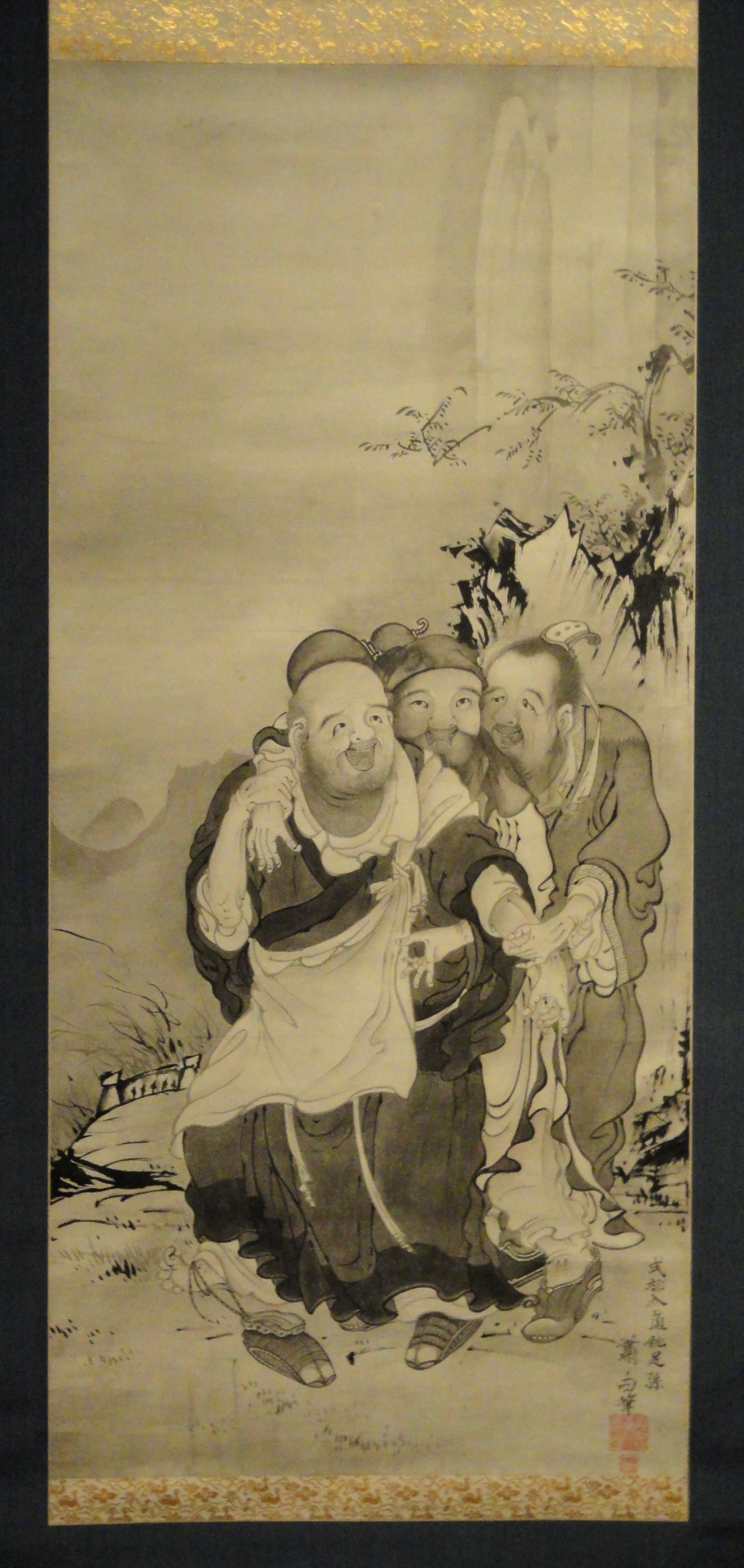
"The Three Laughers of Tiger Ravine" – Huiyuan, Tao Yuanming, and Lu Xiujing – Soga Shōhaku (1730-1781).

Huiyuan began studying the Zhuangzi, Laozi, and the teachings of Confucius at a young age. However, at the age of 21 he was converted to Buddhism in Hebei Province by the monk Dao An, a Chinese disciple of a Kuchan missionary. Hearing the sermons of Dao An convinced Huiyuan to "leave the family" and embark on a life of Buddhist teachings. Later, he founded Donglin Temple (East Forest Temple) at the foot of Mount Lu. His teachings were various, including the vinaya (戒律), meditation (禪法), abhidharma, and Prajna or wisdom. Although Huiyuan did not take initiative in establishing relations with the secular world, he had contacts with court and gentry families. Huiyuan was on two occasions invited by the dictator Huan Xuan to take part in discussions about the status of the clergy, whose independence Huiyuan defended. Members of the cultured classes came to live on Mount Lu as Huiyuan's lay disciples to take part in religious life. Huiyuan also upheld a learned correspondence with the monk Kumarajiva.

In the year 402 he organized a group of monks and lay people into a Mahayana sect known as Pure Land Buddhism, the Pure Land being the western paradise of the Buddha Amitabha.

In the year 404, Huiyuan wrote On Why Monks Do Not Bow Down Before Kings (沙門不敬王者論). This book symbolized his efforts to assert the political independence of Buddhist clergy from the courts of monarchic rulers. At the same time, it was a religious and political text that aimed to convince monarchs and Confucian-minded ministers of state that followers of Buddhism were ultimately not subversive. He argued that Buddhists could make good subjects in a kingdom due to their beliefs in retribution of karma and the desire to be reborn in paradise. Despite the Buddhists' reputation of leaving their family behind for a monastic life, Huiyuan stated "those who rejoice in the Way of the Buddha invariably first serve their parents and obey their lords."

== See also ==
- Jingying Huiyuan
- Buddhism in China
- Chinese philosophy
- White Lotus

== Bibliography ==
- Bary, Theodor de (1999). Huiyuan: A monk does not bow down before a king. In: Sources of Chinese tradition, vol. I, New York: Columbia University Press, pp 426–432
- Ebrey, Patricia Buckley (1999). The Cambridge Illustrated History of China. Cambridge: Cambridge University Press.
- Zheng, Changji (972). "The Tale of Master Yuan of Mount Lu". In Mair, Victor H.; Steinhardt, Nancy S.; Goldin, Paul R. (eds.). Hawai'i Reader in Traditional Chinese Culture. Translated by Sen, Tansen; Mair, Victor H. Honolulu: University of Hawai'i Press (published 2005). pp. 304–339. ISBN 0824827856.
- Zürcher, E. and Teiser, Stephen F. (2007). Buddhist Conquest of China : The Spread and Adaptation of Buddhism in Early Medieval China (3rd Edition). Boston, MA: Brill Academic Publishers, pp. 204–53.
