= Huang Yupian =

- Occupation: Writer
- Notable work: A Detailed Refutation of Heresy

Huang Yupian (黃育楩 Pinyin: Huáng Yùpián, Wade-Giles: Huang Yüp'ien) is best known as the author of A Detailed Refutation of Heresy (破邪詳辯 Pōxié Xiángbiàn), written in 1838. A native of Gansu province, he served as the magistrate of Qinghe (清河) county in Zhili (直隸) province, present day Hebei, from 1830.

Little is known about Huang other than what is recorded in his work. He saw his ideological attacks of evil cults as part of his duty as a scholar official, and was especially concerned with the popularity of local White Lotus sects. To this end he confiscated sectarian religious writings known as Precious Scrolls (寶卷 bǎojuàn) and established schools to teach correct Confucian doctrine.
