= Donglin Temple (Jiujiang) =

Buddhist temple in Jiangxi, China

- 东林寺
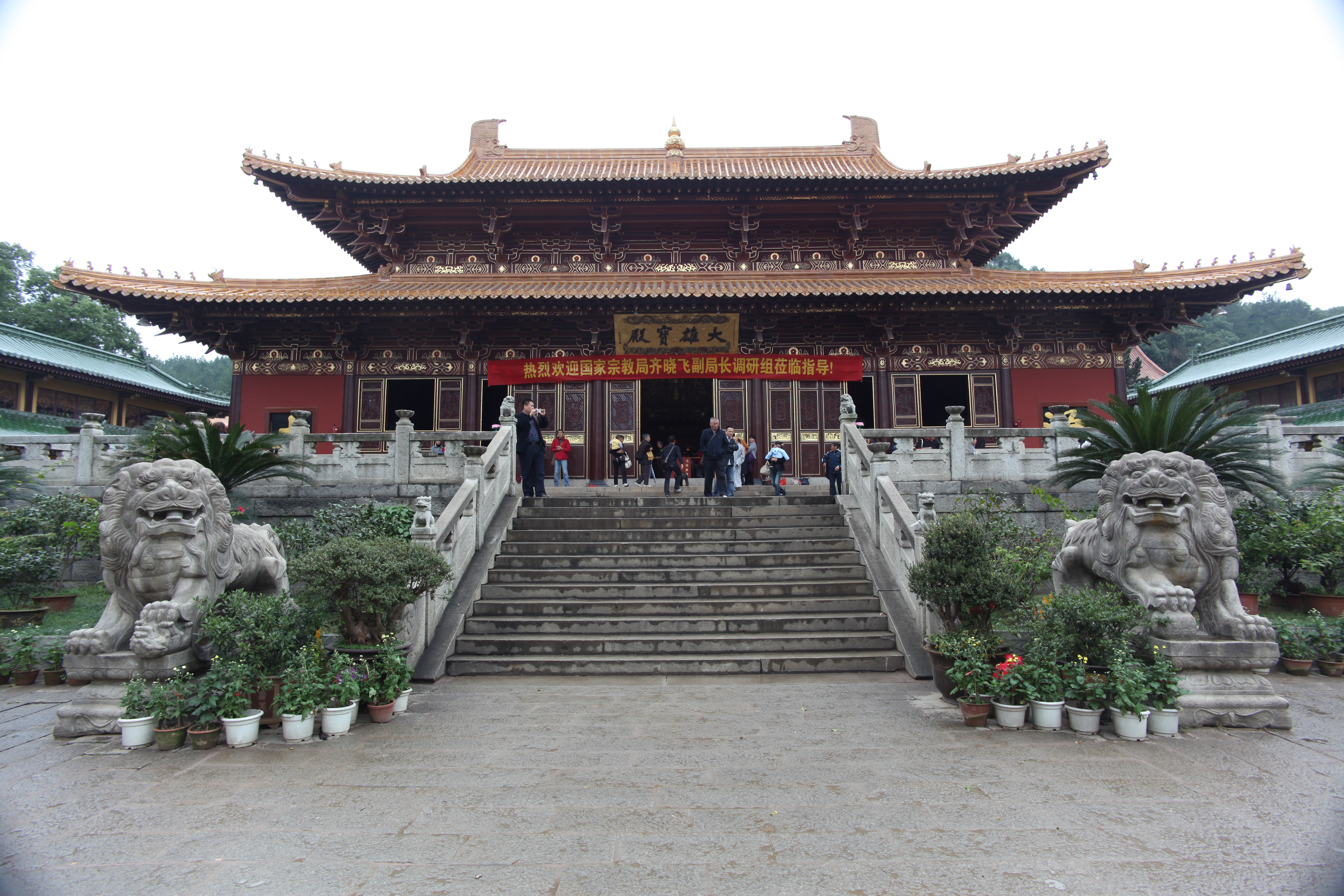
- Mahavira Hall at Donglin Temple.

Religion
- Affiliation: Buddhism
- Sect: Pure Land Buddhism
- Leadership: Shi Da'an (释大安)

Location
- Location: Mount Lu, Jiujiang
- Country: China
- Interactive map of Donglin Temple
- Coordinates: 29°36′16″N 115°57′20″E

Architecture
- Style: Chinese architecture
- Founder: Huiyuan
- Established: 386

Website
- lsdls.cn

Donglin Temple (simplified Chinese: 东林寺; traditional Chinese: 東林寺; pinyin: Dōnglín sì; lit. 'Eastern Forest Temple') is a Buddhist temple approximately 20 kilometres (12 mi) from Jiujiang, in the north of Jiangxi province, China. Built in 386 CE at the foot of Mount Lu by Huiyuan, founder of the Pure Land Buddhism, it is well known for how long it has stood without collapsing.

In the Tang dynasty, Jianzhen made several trips to Japan for the mission of preaching Buddhism. As a result, Huiyuan and the doctrine of Donglin Temple began to spread in Japan. Donglin Temple made contributions to improve cultural exchanges and friendly visits between China and Nepal, India, Japan.

The monastery reached its peak of influence during the Tang dynasty (618–907 CE), but was severely damaged during the Taiping Rebellion and was almost destroyed during the Republican period (1912–1949) of Chinese history.

== History ==
=== Eastern Jin dynasty ===
Donglin Temple was originally built as "Longquan Jingshe" (龙泉精舍) in 386 by a prominent Buddhist monk named Huiyuan, founder of the Pure Land Sect of Buddhism, under the Eastern Jin dynasty (266–420). During his time as abbot, he disseminated Pure Land Buddhism for 30 years, and attracted large numbers of practitioners. He organized the White Lotus Society (白莲社), a community gathered 123 Chinese and foreign monks and scholars. Indian Buddhist monks Tanmoti (昙摩提) and Sengjia Tipo (僧加提婆) also delivered Buddhism at that time.

=== Tang dynasty ===
The temple experienced unprecedented growth during the Tang dynasty (618–907), and it had more than one thousand monks and was 120,000 square metres (1,300,000 sq ft) in size, with 310 halls and rooms. Jianzhen, an exceptional Buddhist monk, lectured the sutras and precepts in the temple before going to Japan. In 753, in the 12th year of Tianbao period, Zhi'en (智恩), a monk in Donglin Temple, arrived in Japan with Jianzhen.

== Structures ==
=== Guest houses ===
Guest houses are provided free of charge for tourists for living there up to three days. Like monastic living, they are sex segregated and rooms have to be shared.

=== Big Buddha of Donglin ===
After decades long donation campaign, the temple built a 48-metre (157 ft) tall statue of the buddha Amitābha surrounded by an 80-metre (260 ft)-tall flame sculpture.

== Public Access ==
Unlike many tourist sites in China, visitors are not required to buy any tickets in this temple. On the contrary, tourists can have free vegetarian meals together with monks (at 6:00–6:30, 11:00–11:30, 17:00–17:30) after joining their religious nianfo exercises.

== Abbot ==
The current abbot of the temple, Master Da'an (大安), was a professor of Beijing University of International Business and Economics.

== See also ==
Various other places are named for the temple, including Donglin Academy and Tōrin-in.

== Gallery ==
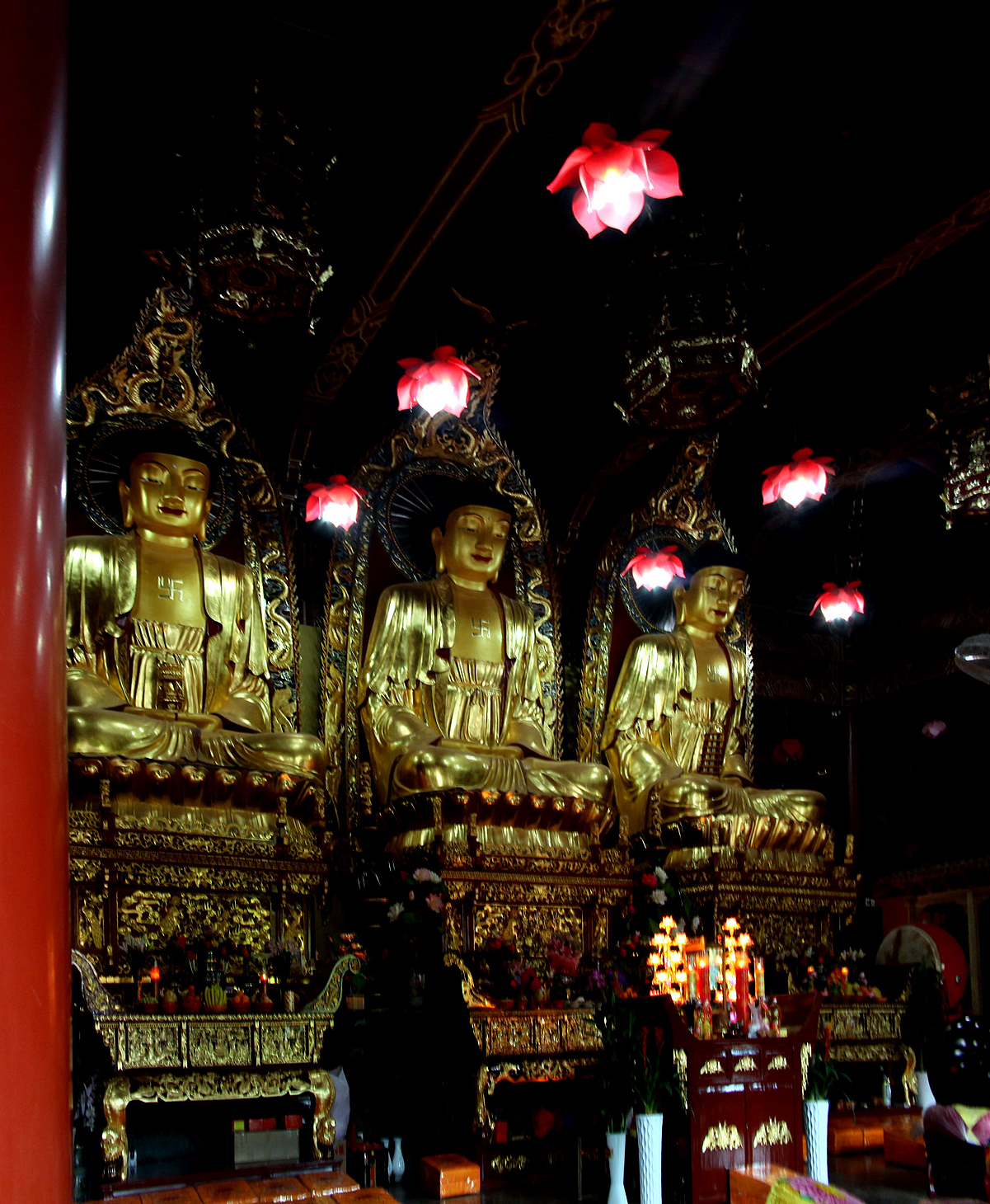
Amitābha (left), The Buddha (center), and Bhaisajyaguru (right)

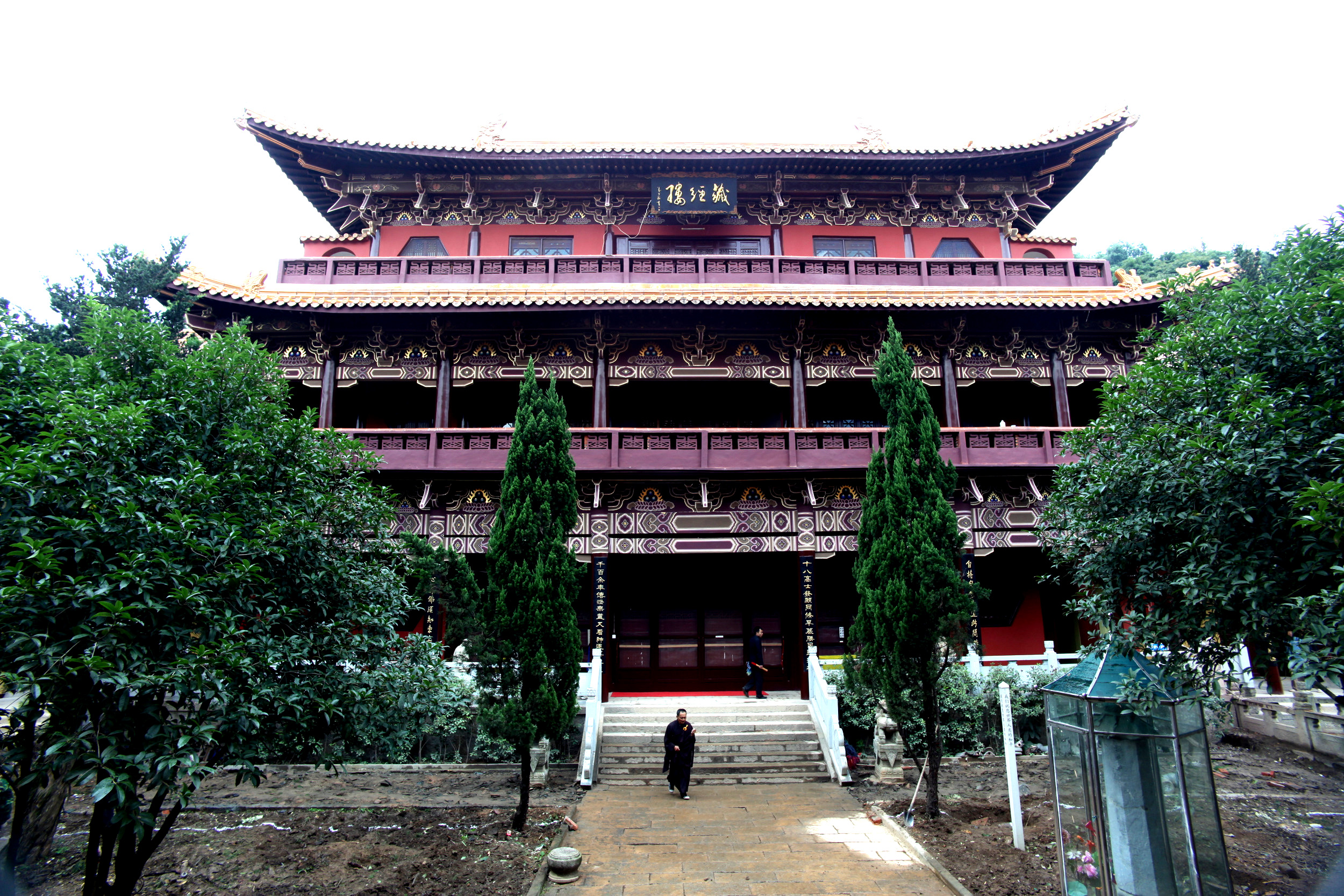
Zangjing ge of Donglin Temple

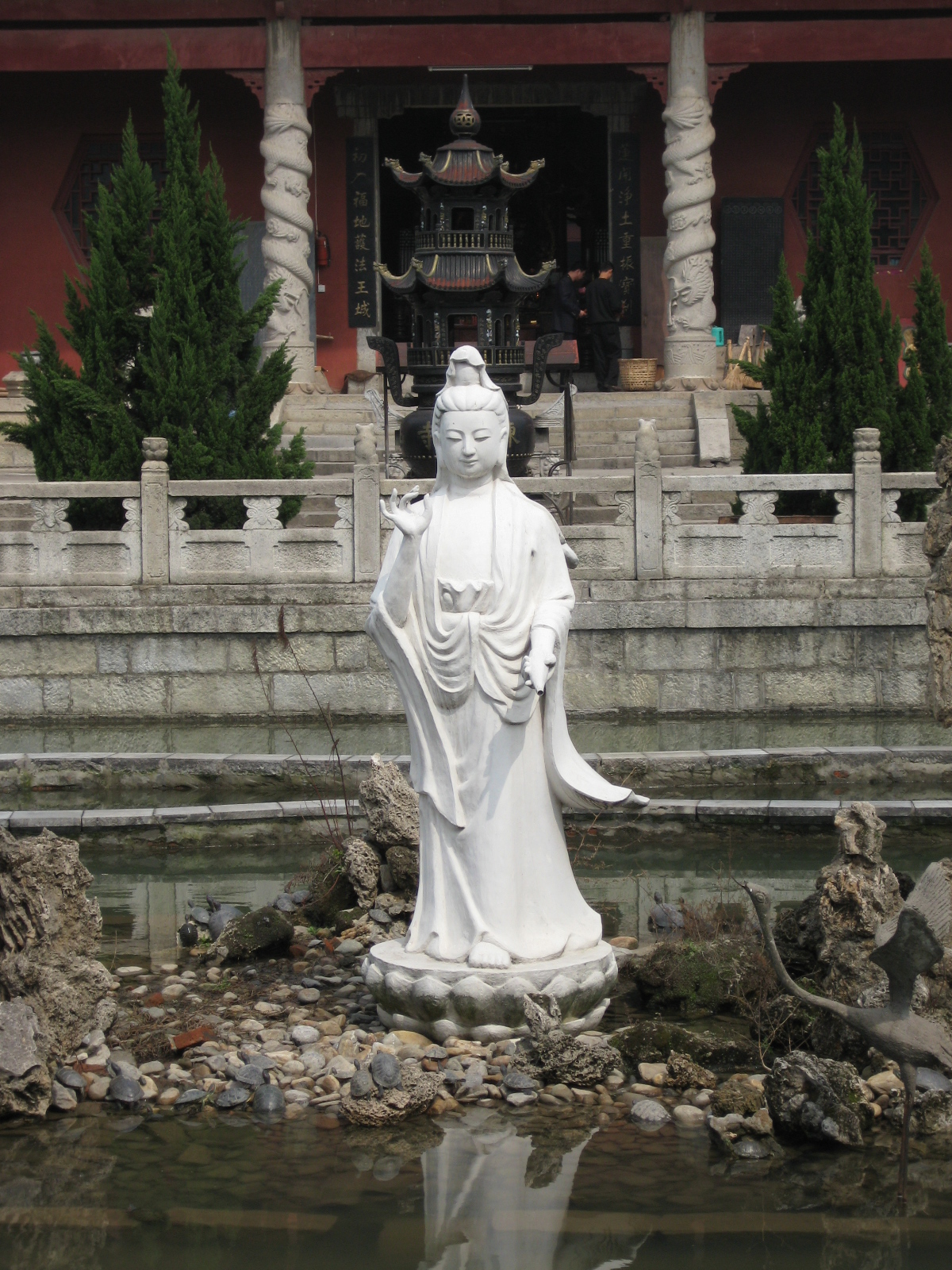
Statue of Guanyin at the Temple

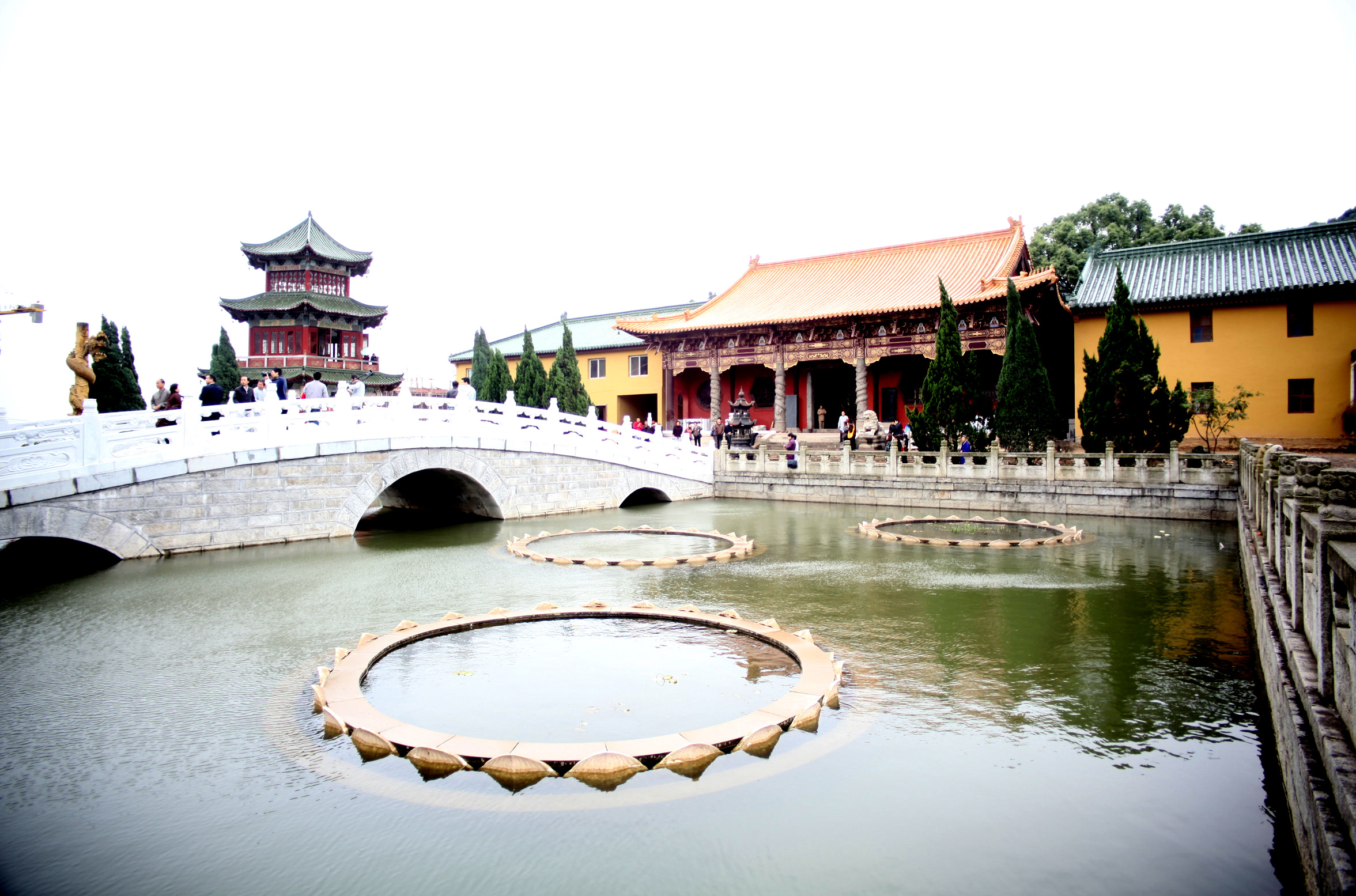
Donglin Temple lotus pond

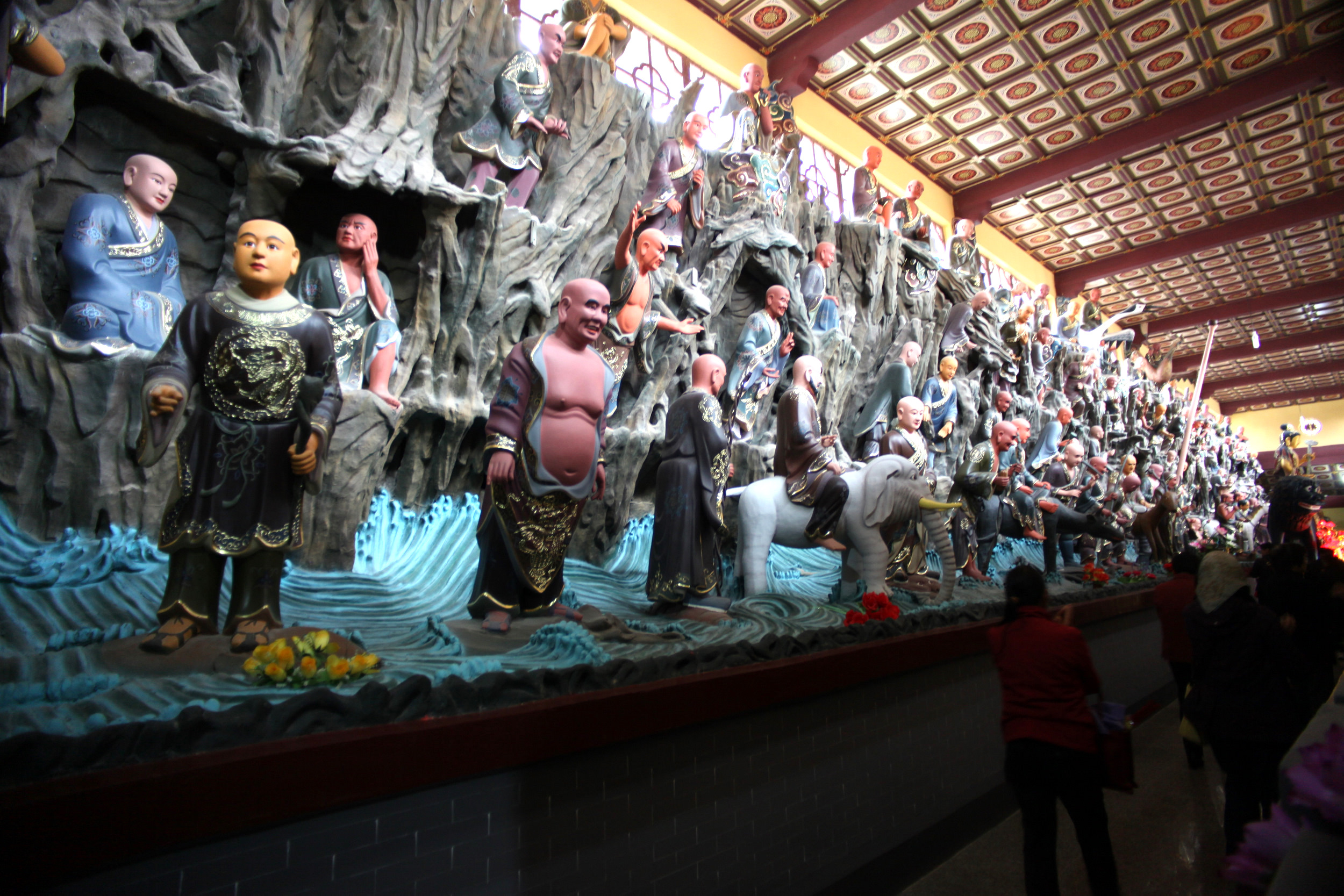
Arhat Hall of Donglin temple

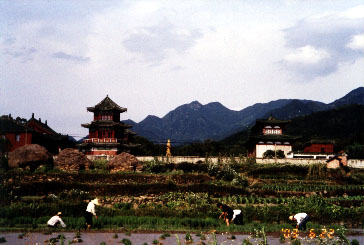
A distant view with farmers working in the foreground
