= White Lotus Societies =

Various religious and political societies throughout Chinese history

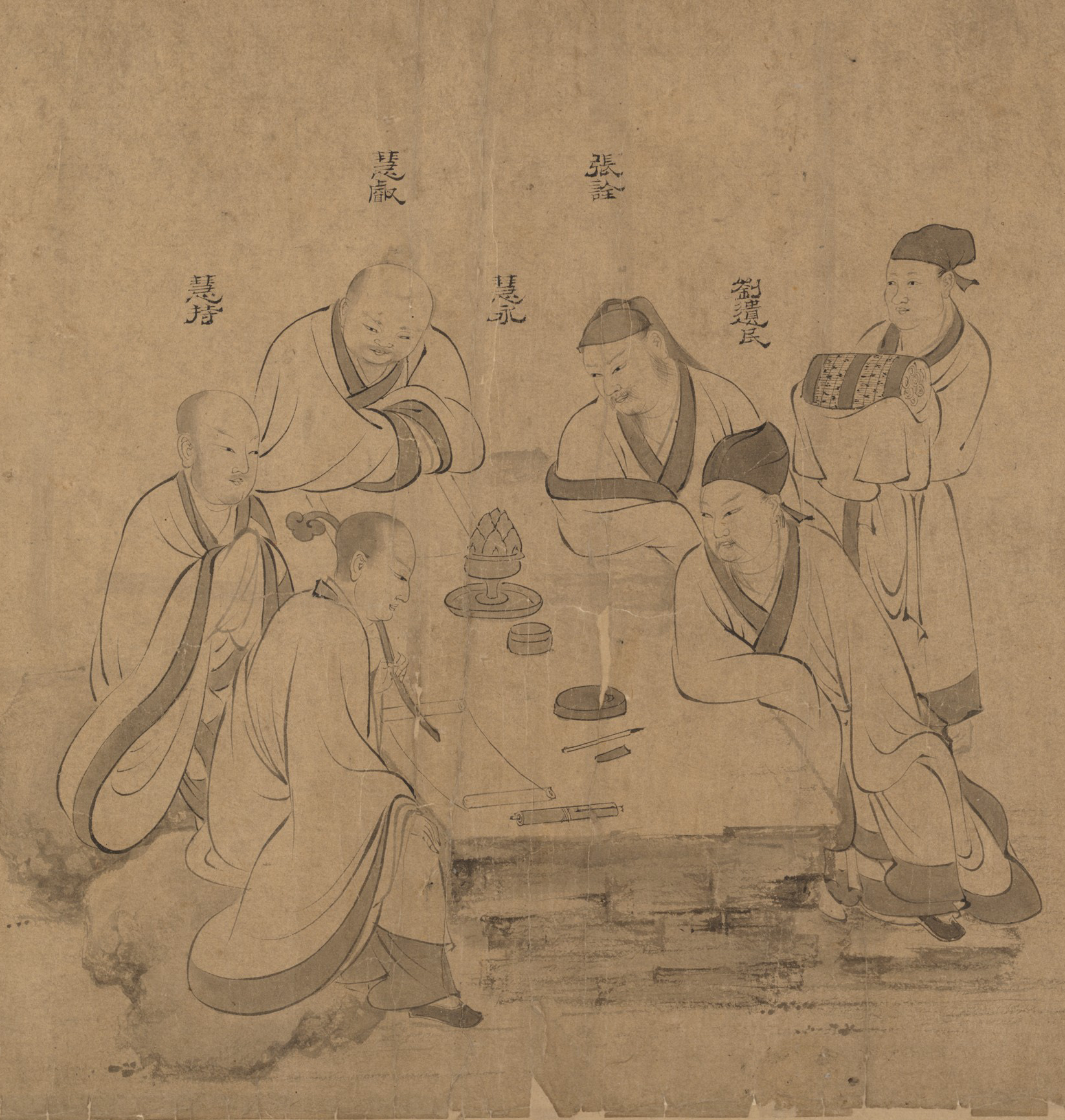
Illustration of a meeting of the Pure Land Buddhist White Lotus Society of Lushan Huiyuan in the style of Li Gonglin, c. Ming–Qing

The term White Lotus Society (Chinese: 白蓮社; pinyin: báilián shè) or White Lotus Teaching (traditional Chinese: 白蓮教; simplified Chinese: 白莲教; pinyin: Báiliánjiào; Wade–Giles: Pai-lien chiao; lit. 'White Lotus Religion') refers to a variety of religious and political groups that emerged in China over many centuries. Initially, the name was associated with Pure Land Buddhist organizations that sought to promote devotional practices centered on rebirth in a Buddhist Pure Land. These early societies emphasized spiritual salvation through faith, chanting of Amitābha's name (nianfo), and adherence to moral precepts.

Over time, however, the term "White Lotus" became associated with diverse salvationist and apocalyptic movements, often blending elements of Buddhism, Confucianism, Daoism, and Chinese folk religion. Many later White Lotus groups adopted millenarian ideologies, predicting the imminent arrival of a new age or a divine savior (mainly the future Buddha Maitreya) to rectify social and cosmic imbalances. These movements frequently arose in times of political turmoil, natural disasters, or social unrest, positioning themselves as vehicles for both spiritual liberation and sociopolitical reform. As White Lotus sects developed, they appealed to many Han Chinese who found solace in the worship of numerous deities, like Queen Mother of the West (or the "Birthless Old Mother" traditional Chinese: 無生老母; simplified Chinese: 无生老母). A few of these groups even supported armed rebellions against the Chinese state, such as during the Qing era White Lotus Rebellion (1794–1804).

== History ==
=== Pure Land Lotus societies ===
The religious background of Pure Land White Lotus societies goes back to the founding of the first White Lotus Society (白蓮社; báilían shè) in the Donglin Temple at Mount Lu by Lushan Huiyuan (334–416). Huiyuan came to be widely celebrated by later Pure Land Buddhists in China as the first patriarch of Pure Land. At some point during the Tang, the name "White Lotus" began to be applied to his community, though it is unlikely that this was the actual name of the group during Huiyuan's time. Huiyuan's society was a small elite group and it did not survive much after his death. However, during the Tang dynasty, there were numerous Buddhist societies associated with various practices including vegetarianism, construction of Buddhist statues, and scripture copying and recitation. Some of these societies were also associated with Pure Land practice, such as the society founded by Zhiyan (564–634).

During the Northern Song period (960–1126), Pure Land Societies were founded throughout southern China, spreading Pure Land teachings and meditation methods with them. The key figures involved in the creation of these Song dynasty Pure Land societies were Tiantai school monks like Shengchang (959–1020) and Siming Zhili. Zhili's society included monks and laypersons, men and women who vowed to recite the name of Buddha Amitabha one thousand times a day. These initial efforts sparked a wave of numerous Pure Land societies based on these models. These societies made Buddhism much more appealing and accessible to the common people, though some societies were also more restrictive (for example, some of them were only for scholar-officials). The various Song dynasty Pure Land societies often took the name "Lotus Society" (lían shè) or "White Lotus" in imitation of Lushan Huiyuan's early community. Pure Land Buddhist societies remained popular in the Ming and Qing dynasty, during which laypersons came to be more and more prominent.

During the 12th century a Buddhist monk, Mao Ziyuan (茅子元) (c. 1096–1166; Dharma name: Cizhao (慈照)), developed the White Lotus School (白蓮宗) in order to connect the scattered White Lotus Societies. He erected a Lotus Repentance Temple (蓮懺堂) where he preached the teachings of the White Lotus School, which became the basis of the White Lotus religion (白莲敎).

During the Yuan dynasty Mao's White Lotus school was banned by the Yuan government and went underground. Several elements of the White Lotus were also involved in later rebellions against the Yuan.

=== Later Lotus societies ===
While most Chinese White Lotus societies were standard Buddhist devotional groups, other similar groups sprung up with more heterodox beliefs. Between 9th and 14th centuries, Chinese Manichaeans also involved themselves with the Pure Land school and devotional movements to the future Buddha Maitreya. Through this close interaction, Manichaeism had profound influence on some Chinese Buddhist sects and folk religions, practicing together so closely alongside the Buddhists that the two traditions became indistinguishable.

During the later Yuan, Ming and Qing dynasties, various new White Lotus groups developed, influenced the organizational methods of the Song era societies. These later White Lotus groups were a result of Religious syncretism between various Buddhist movements and other religions like Chinese Manichaeism and Chinese Folk religion. They emphasised Maitreya teachings and strict vegetarianism; its permission for men and women to interact freely was considered socially shocking.

Some of these societies also became politically active, opposing the rule of the imperial dynasties. This trend began during the late thirteenth century, when the Mongol Yuan dynasty's rule over China (1271–1368) prompted small yet popular demonstrations against its rule. As they grew into widespread dissent, adherents of White Lotus sects took part in some of these protests, leading the Yuan government to ban White Lotus religions and related sects as heterodox religious sects (宗教异端), forcing their members to go underground.

Now a secret society, White Lotus groups became an instrument of quasi-national resistance and religious organisation. This fear of secret societies carried on in the law; the Great Qing Legal Code, which was in effect until 1912, contained the following section:

[A]ll societies calling themselves at random White Lotus, communities of the Buddha Maitreya, or the Mingtsung religion (Manichaeans), or the school of the White Cloud, etc., together with all who carry out deviant and heretical practices, or who in secret places have prints and images, gather the people by burning incense, meeting at night and dispersing by day, thus stirring up and misleading people under the pretext of cultivating virtue, shall be sentenced.

Like other secret societies, they covered up their unusual or illicit activities as "incense burning ceremonies".

=== White Lotus Revolutions ===
The White Lotus was a fertile ground for fomenting rebellion.

The White Lotus doctrines and religious observances, particularly their "incense burning" ceremonies which in the popular mind came to typify them, merged with the doctrines and rituals of the Maitreyan sectarians; that produced a cohering ideology among rebel groups, uniting them in common purpose and supplying discipline with which to build a broad movement, recruit armies, and establish civil governing.

A Buddhist monk from Jiangxi named Peng Yingyu began to study the White Lotus and ended up organizing a rebellion in the 1330s. Although the rebellion was put down, Peng survived and hid in Anhui, then reappeared back in South China where he led another unsuccessful rebellion in which he was killed. This second rebellion changed its colours from white to red and its soldiers were known as the "Red Turbans" for their red bandanas.

Another revolution inspired by the White Lotus society took shape in 1352 around Guangzhou. A Buddhist monk and former boy-beggar, the future Ming dynasty founder Zhu Yuanzhang, joined the rebellion. His exceptional intelligence took him to the head of a rebel army; he won people to his side by forbidding his soldiers to pillage in observance of White Lotus religious beliefs. By 1355 the rebellion had spread through much of China.

In 1356, Zhu Yuanzhang captured the important city of Nanjing (then called Jiangning) and made it his capital, renaming it Yingtian (應天). It was here that he began to discard his heterodox beliefs and so won the help of Confucian scholars who issued pronouncements for him and performed rituals in his claim of the Mandate of Heaven, the first step toward establishing a new dynastic.

Meanwhile, the Mongols were fighting among themselves, inhibiting their ability to suppress the rebellion. In 1368, Zhu Yuanzhang extended his rule to Guangzhou, the same year that the Mongol ruler, Toghon Temür, fled to Karakorum. In 1368, Zhu Yuanzhang and his army entered the former capital of Beijing and in 1371 his army moved through Sichuan to the southwest.

By 1387, after more than thirty years of war, Zhu Yuanzhang had liberated all of China. He took the title Hongwu Emperor and founded the Ming dynasty, whose name echoes the religious sentiment of the White Lotus.

By 1622, Xu Hongru, the leader of the White Lotus sect (Kenneth Swope said Xu Hongru was a Catholic convert conspired with Yu Hongzhi, a peasant rebels leader from Jingzhou (now Jingxian County, Hebei Province) and a rebel named Zhang Shipei from Caozhou (now Caoxian County, Shandong Province) to launch the uprising on the Mid-Autumn Festival. However, due to the leak of the plan, Xu Hongru revolted three months earlier out of fear of a preemptive action by the government. He declared himself Zhongxing Fuliedi (literally, lucky, devoted lord of the restoration). The followers of Xu Hongru wore red turban, they soon capture Yuncheng, Zouxian, Tengxian and other places, controlling both sides of the Grand Canal and cutting off the grain transport. The rebel army quickly captured Yuncheng, Zouxian, Tengxian and Yixian, and about 100,000 people submitted and joined them. At the same time, Yu Hongzhi raised troops in Wuyi, Zaoqiang and Hengshui in Hebei Province. Liu Yongming also gathered 20,000 people and soon joined Xu Hongru's rebels alliance. They planned to connect their movements from Xuhuai, Chen, Ying, Qi and Huang in the south, intercept the grain transport in the middle, and finally reach the capital in the north.

In November 1622, Xu Hongru was betrayed by his subordinates, arrested in Zou County, and taken to the capital, where he was executed. The peasant uprising initiated and led by Xu Hongru lasted for more than half a year and shook Shandong and the imperial court. Although the main force was defeated, the remaining forces continued to fight until August 1624. Due to the severe drought, the peasants in Zou County had no source of income. Hundreds of peasant soldiers gathered in Sizhou and started a struggle against the Ming rulers again. When Li Zicheng rose up to rebel in Mizhi, the so-called "Dongling Fumang" who joined him refers to Xu Hongru's followers and its remnants. Gu Yingta testified that there was a direct line of succession from Xu Hongru to Li Zicheng's uprising is correct. When Li Zicheng marched into Henan. This suggests that the White Lotus Sect members organized by Xu Hongru constituted Li Zicheng's forces. When Li Zicheng openly rebelled, followers of as the White Lotus Society which had long time predicted that a figure with surname "Li" would one day become the emperor. Li Zicheng tried to use faith to solidify his own legitimacy by consulting a soothsayer. However, when the soothsayer denied Li Zicheng as the prophesied "Emperor Li", and foretold his imminent demise, he had the soothsayer executed.

During the uprising in 1813, The Baguadao sect was speculated as being a branch of White Lotus Societies.

The White Lotus reemerged in the late 18th century in the form of an inspired Chinese movement in many different forms and sects.

In 1774, the herbalist and martial artist Wang Lun founded a derivative sect of the White Lotus that promoted underground meditation teachings in Shandong province, not far from Beijing near the city of Linqing. The sect led an uprising that captured three small cities and laid siege to the larger city of Linqing, a strategic location on the north–south Grand Canal transportation route. After initial success, he was outnumbered and defeated by Qing troops, including local armies of Chinese soldiers known as the Green Standard Army.

An account of Wang Lun's death was given to Qing authorities by a captured rebel. Wang Lun remained sitting in his headquarters wearing a purple robe and two silver bracelets while he burned to death with his dagger and double-bladed sword beside him. Wang Lun likely failed because he did not make any attempts to raise wide public support. He did not distribute captured wealth or food supplies, nor did he promise to lessen the tax burden. Unable to build up a support base, he was forced to quickly flee all three cities that he attacked in order to evade government troops. Though he passed through an area inhabited by almost a million peasants, his army never measured more than four thousand soldiers, many of whom had been forced into service.

In the first decade of the nineteenth century, there were also several White Lotus sects active in the area around the capital city of Beijing. Lin Qing, another member of the Eight Trigrams sect within the White Lotus, united several of these sects and with them build an organization that he would later lead in the Eight Trigrams uprising of 1813.

Administrators also seized and destroyed sectarian scriptures used by the religious groups. One such official was Huang Yupian (黃育楩), who refuted the ideas found in the scriptures Buddhist views in A Detailed Refutation of Heresy (破邪詳辯; Pōxié Xiángbiàn), which was written in 1838. This book has since become an invaluable source in understanding the beliefs of these groups.

A systematic program of pacification followed in which the populace was resettled in hundreds of stockaded villages and organized into militia. In its last stage, the Qing suppression policy combined pursuit and extermination of rebel guerrilla bands with a program of amnesty for deserters. The rebellion came to an end in 1804. A decree from the Daoguang Emperor admitted, "it was extortion by local officials that goaded the people into rebellion". Using the arrest of sectarian members as a threat, local officials and police extorted money from people. Actual participation in sect activities had no impact on an arrest; whether or not monetary demands were met, however, did.

=== Second Sino-Japanese War ===
White Lotus adherents who collaborated with the Japanese during the Second Sino-Japanese War (1937–1945) were fought against by the Muslim General Ma Biao.

=== Uses of the term "White Lotus" in later periods ===
While traditional historiography has linked many Maitreyist and millenarian uprisings during the Ming and Qing dynasties as all related to the White Lotus, there are reasons to doubt that such connections existed. B. J. Ter Haar has argued that the term "White Lotus" became a label applied by late Ming and Qing imperial bureaucrats to any number of different popular uprisings, millenarian societies or "magical" practices such as mantra recitation and divination. If this interpretation is correct, the steady rise in the number of White Lotus rebellions in imperial histories during the Ming and Qing does not necessarily reflect the increasing strength of a unified organization. Instead, this trend reflects a growing concern by imperial bureaucrats with any form of Buddhism practiced outside of the sanctioned frameworks of the monasteries.

==== Tiandihui and the Triads ====
The White Lotus sect may have been one of the main ancestors of the Chinese organizations known as the Triads. The Triads were originally members and soldiers of the Tiandihui or "Heaven and Earth Society" during the period of the war between the Ming and Qing dynasties. The Triads' formation was not for criminal purposes, but to overthrow the Qing and restore the Ming to power. The White Lotus Society may have been one of five branches of the Heaven Earth Society which formed at the Shaolin Monastery from Ming loyalists.

== Belief and practice ==
=== Birthless Old Mother ===
Despite their involvement in overthrowing the Yuan dynasty and therefore in the founding of Ming dynasty, the White Lotus did not cease its political activities against Chinese authorities; consequently, it remained prohibited during the Ming dynasty. Since they were prohibited from establishing a central authority, no doctrinal orthodoxy could be enforced, allowing their teachings and practices to increasingly diversify. While Maitreya remained the central figure for most White Lotus sects, during the reign of the Zhengde Emperor (1506–1521) a new deity began to grow in popularity among White Lotus adherents, namely Queen Mother of the West (or the "Birthless Old Mother" 無生老母). Originating from the Daoist Chinese folk religion, she was identified as the transcendent Buddha who never incarnated but exists without coming into being or transforming into non-being, but was nevertheless foretold to come down upon earth to gather all her children at the millennium into one family and guide them safely back to Heaven, the "home of the true emptiness" (真空家鄉).

== Popular culture ==
- In the martial arts film Once Upon a Time in China II, members of the White Lotus are featured as antagonists.
- The martial arts film Clan of the White Lotus, features "Priest White Lotus" as the main villain, who is seeking revenge after the death of his brother Pai Mei.
- Avatar: The Last Airbender, an animated television series produced by Nickelodeon, features a secret society named the Order of the White Lotus.
- The Mortal Kombat franchise also features the White Lotus society, a fictional foundation.

== See also ==
- Chinese Buddhism
- Chinese Manichaeism
- Ming Cult
- Pure Land Buddhism
- Secret society
- Xiantiandao
- Yiguandao

== Bibliography ==
- Dai, Yingcong (2019). The White Lotus War: Rebellion and Suppression in Late Imperial China. University of Washington Press.
- Flower, Theresa J. (1976). Millenarian themes in the White Lotus Society (Thesis). McMaster University. hdl:11375/7251.
- Ma, Xisha; Meng, Huiying (2011). Popular Religion and Shamanism. Brill. ISBN 978-9004174559.
- Mote, Frederick W. (2003). Imperial China 900–1800. Harvard University Press. ISBN 978-0-674-01212-7.
- Naquin, Susan (1976). Millenarian Rebellion in China: The Eight Trigrams Uprising of 1813. Yale University Press. hdl:1811/5983.
- Purcell, Victor (3 June 2010). The Boxer Uprising: A Background Study. Cambridge University Press. pp. 149–. ISBN 978-0-521-14812-2.
- Seiwert, Hubert Michael (2003). Popular Religious Movements and Heterodox Sects in Chinese History. Brill. ISBN 9004131469.
- Swope, Kenneth (2014). The Military Collapse of China's Ming Dynasty. Routledge.
- Spence, Jonathan D. (1991). The Search for Modern China. W.W.Norton. ISBN 978-0-393-30780-1.
- Teng, Ssu-yü (1958). "A Political Interpretation of Chinese Rebellions and Revolutions". Tsing Hua Journal of Chinese Studies. 1 (3).
- Ter Haar, Barend J. (1992). The White Lotus Teachings in Chinese Religious History. Leiden: Brill.
- Theobald, Ulrich (2012). "Bailianjiao 白蓮教, the White Lotus Sect". www.chinaknowledge.de.
- Zhu, Weizheng (2015). Rereading Modern Chinese History. BRILL. ISBN 978-9004293311.
- Yar, Char (2012). Monijiao (Manichaeism) in China (Speech). Lecture presented at the Worldwide Conference for Historical Research. academia.edu. Beijing.
