= Luo teaching =

Chinese folk religious tradition

Luoism 羅教 / 罗教
- Type: Chinese salvationist religion
- Scripture: Wubuliuce (五部六册)
- Founder: Patriarch Luo (罗祖)
- Origin: late 15th century Shandong
- Other names: Wuweiism (无为教), Luozuism (罗祖教), Changshengdao (长生道 Way of the Eternal Life), (Note: Also Changshengism (长生教; Chángshēng jiào)) Dacheng (大乘 Great Vehicle), Sancheng (三乘 Third Vehicle), Wukong (悟空 Nothing Emptiness), (Note: 悟空教; Wùkōng jiào) Wunian (无年 Timeless), Yuandun (圆顿 Sudden Stillness) teachings, Yaoism

Luo Teaching or Luodao (Chinese: 罗道; Chinese: 羅道; pinyin: Luó dào; lit. 'Way of Luo') or Luoism (罗教; 羅教; Luó jiào), originally Wuweiism (无为教; 無為教; Wúwéi jiào), refers to a Chinese folk religious tradition, a wide range of sect organisations flourishing over the last five hundred years, which trace their origins back to the mystic and preacher Luo Menghong (1443–1527) or known as Luo Qing (羅清) or the Patriarch Luo (罗祖; 羅祖; Luōzǔ) and the revelation contained in his major scripture, the Wǔbùliùcè (五部六册; "Five Instructions in Six Books"), the official title of which is The Scroll of Apprehending the Way through Hard Work and that marked the beginning of the precious scrolls' tradition.

Luo and the movement he started is considered the most important influence within the Chinese salvationist tradition. A wide range of religious groups such as the Immortal Sect (長生教), Green Lotus Sect (青蓮教), ZhenKong (真空教), Zhaijiao (齋教) and Yiguandao (一貫道) can be traced to Luo's teachings, their names are numerous and have changed over the centuries. Some of them have remained close to original Wuweiism as transmitted in Luo's scriptures, while other ones have developed other beliefs only preserving the name of the founding master.

Types of Luodao, together with other folk religions, have revived rapidly in China since the 1980s.

== History ==
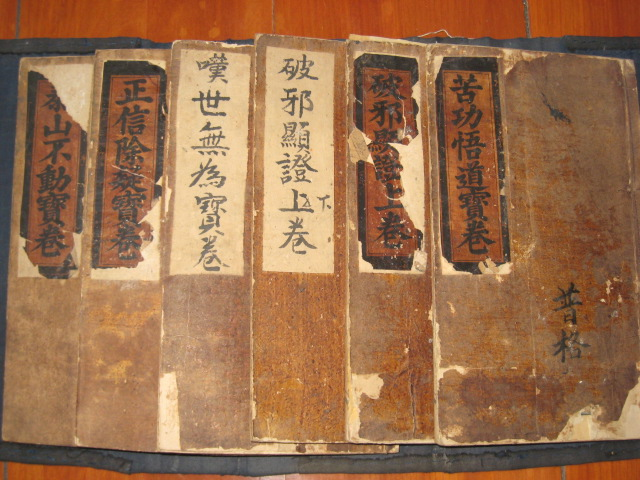
Set of the Wubuliuce, the baojuan of Luoism.

Luo Menghong was born in 1442 in the area of Jimo, in Shandong province. His religious titles were Luo Qing (Luo the Clear), Luo Jing (Luo the Quiet) and the Inactive Hermit (无为隐士; Wúwéi Yǐnshì). He died at the age of eighty-five in 1527. The religious group he founded was called "Wuweiism", a name that has been continued by the purest branches of the movement in later history.

=== Early direct transmissions ===
As long as Patriarch Luo was alive, his personality guaranteed the unity of the movement. While some of his disciples may have established separate communities, they didn't contest Luo's position as teacher and leader of Wuweiism. Then, when Luo died, apparently without having chosen a successor to the leadership, the Wuwei teaching started to split into different branches all claiming to continue Luo's tradition.

Little more than half a century after the death of Luo, the activities of Luoist sects began to raise the suspicion of state officials. Just after 1584 several warnings were presented to the throne, against the influence of Luoism linking it to the earlier White Lotus movement, a label which by that time had become a derogatory designation used by official historians to demonise religious groups considered heretical by the established orthodoxy. At the end of the 16th century there were religious groups which influenced and in turn were influenced by the Luoists, Hongyangism (弘阳教 "Red [or Great] Sun") and the Huangtiandao ("Way of the Yellow Sky"), both identifying as Taoist branches.

Documents produced by the Buddhist establishment condemning Luoists testify the activity in the late 16th century of the branches known as Great Vehicles (大乘; Dacheng or 大乘教; Dàchéngjiào) and Timeless (无年; Wunian or 无年教; Wúniánjiào) Luoism. The sources show that at the end of the 16th century, Luoist sects had spread widely in northern China, and they were known by different names.

=== Luo family transmission ===
Also the Luo family contributed to the transmission of Luo's teaching. Within the original movement, Luo's wife and two children, Fozheng and Foguang, occupied relevant positions. Successively, Luo's wife continued the teaching according to the original tradition. She founded a branch named Sudden Stillness (圆頓; Yuandun or 圆顿正教; Yuándùn zhèngjiào; "right transmission of Sudden Stillness") which by the late Ming dynasty no longer claimed connection to Luo's wife.

Fozheng continued the male line of the Luo family. His grandson Wenju is mentioned in the imprint of the 1615 edition of the Wubuliuce, printed in Nanjing. Luo Congshan, the fourth generation patriarch, lived at the beginning of the 17th century. A century later, official records testify that there were still male descendants of Luo active as sect leaders. The centre of the family was in Miyun, where the tomb of Luo Menghong still existed. It was destroyed on official order in 1768.

=== Grand Canal transmission ===
In the early 18th century Luoist sects spread along the Grand Canal from Hebei to Zhejiang and Fujian; boatmen belonging to Luoist sects recognised the eighth generation descendant Luo Mingzhong as the head of the religion. Records of the late 18th century testify the contribution of three persons surnamed Qiang, Wen and Pan, to the diffusion of the religion in southeast China. They founded three different lines, which congregation halls (an) also functioned as social relief institutions. After the ninth patriarch the line of hereditary leadership came to an end. An investigation of 1816 testifies that the male descendants of Luo no longer practiced the religion of the forefather.

=== Yin Ji'nan and Yaoism ===
Meanwhile, in the 16th century Yin Ji'nan (1527–1582) from Zhejiang originated an independent line that successfully spread throughout their native province, Fujian, Jiangxi and surrounding southern provinces. He became the leader of a Luoist group and reformed it into the Venerable Officials' teaching of fasting (老官斋教; Lǎoguān zhāijiào), which in later centuries gave rise to the Xiantiandao.

Yin Ji'nan organised his movement into a hierarchy and integrated the belief of Maitreyanism, the Wusheng Laomu and the Three Suns eschatology within the original Luoist doctrines through the influence of a Hunyuan sect. Years after Yin's death, Yao Wenyu (1578–1646) rose as the leader of the religion with strong opposition from other influential members, although he greatly expanded the sect's empire. By the time of Yao's successors in the late 17th century the sect was known as the Numinous Mountain (灵山; Lingshan; school name 灵山正派; Língshān zhèngpài; "orthodox school of the Numinous Mountain")

Yaoism later gave rise to the Dragon Flower (龙花; Longhua or 龙花教; Lónghuā jiào) sect and other branches. Wu Zixiang's branch, the Great Vehicle (Dacheng) or Third Vehicle (三乘; Sancheng or 三乘教; Sānchéng jiào) introduced his scripture entitled the "Book of the Great Precepts of the Great Vehicle" (Dacheng dajie jing).

=== Zhenkongdao and other branches ===
Another important indirect branching is that started by Sun Zhenkong, claiming to be the fourth patriarch after Qin Dongshan and Master Zhao, a disciple of Luo who founded and independent group called Wujidao (无极道; "Way of the Unlimited"). Patriarch Sun incorporated the theology of Maitreya and Wusheng Laomu just half a century after the death of Luo and called his group the Namodao (南無道). The Namodao later developed into different currents. A disciple of Yi Ji'nan's school, Pushen, formulated a Chan interpretation of Luo's writings that excluded the Maitreya eschatology.

Zhenkongdao (真空道; "Way of the True Void"; also 真空教; Zhēnkōngjiào; "Zhenkongism") founded in Anhui in the 1860s, is another Luoist branch promoting sitting meditation, healing, and scriptures recitation. The group expanded to Fujian in the late 19th century, and from there throughout southern China and Southeast Asian Chinese ethnic groups. It is possibly a continuation of Patriarch Sun's branch.

== Luo Menghong's life and mysticism ==
An orphan since youth, Luo Qing was raised by relatives and became a soldier. At the age of twenty-eight, for his distressful sentiment of forlornness, he went on a spiritual quest and studied with several teachers, although he was unable to establish permanent relationships. Only at the age of forty, apparently without a direct guidance of a teacher, he reached enlightenment: awareness to be united with the absolute principle of reality. He began gathering disciples and wrote the Wubuliuce ("Five Instructions in Six Books"), first printed in 1527.

Written in a lucid vernacular language, Luo's texts are characterised by an egalitarian tone, erasing differences between lay and clergy, upper and lower classes, and men and women. Drawing on his own experience as an orphan, Luo describes the human condition of being lost and in search of one's true home and refuge. He speaks of the final destination that is the absolute principle of being, variously representing it through abstract symbols. An experience similar to that of Luo can be found in the biography of Lin Zhao'en, the founder of the Sanyi teaching.

By the 17th century the teachings of Luo combined with other folk beliefs, namely Maitreyan millenarianism and the folk mother goddess. In the new mythological representation of Luo's enlightenment, humans are children of the primordial goddess. Confused by the desires of the material world, they have forgotten their celestial origin, and so the Mother sends emissaries to remind her children the possibility of return to the original condition in the Three Suns, or stages of the world. The three enlightened beings are Dipankara, Gautama and Maitreya the future one.

== Doctrine ==
=== God and the Goddess ===
In the theology of Luoist sects the absolute principle of the universe is the central focus of meaning and worship. In the original writings of Luo it is represented as "True Void" (真空; Zhēnkōng). In Luoist writings the symbol of wúshēng (無生; "unborn") means the state of "no birth and no death" that gives enlightenment. Since in sectarian writings it often occurs in the combination Wusheng Laomu (無生老母; "Unborn Venerable Mother") there is a certain temptation to treat Wusheng as an abridged form of Wusheng Laomu. Since the 17th century the prevalent representation became a goddess, the Unborn Venerable Mother. This belief is shared by many Luoist sects, one of which is Yin Ji'nan's sect who came from Huangtianjiao who also has a tradition of worshipping Lao Mu. Other symbols of the source of being, also common to other traditions, are Wújí (the "Unlimited"), Zhēn (真; "Truth, True Reality"), Gǔfú (古佛; "Ancient Awakened").

These symbols are commonly combined in sect's precious scrolls to express the impersonal absolute origin according to the tastes of different social groups. The absolute principle is also associated to the Big Dipper asterism.

Luo Menghong's original revelation emphasises the impersonal representation of the absolute. However, he also talks of Holy Patriarch of the Unlimited (无极圣祖; Wújí Shèngzǔ) and of the mother as a duality, the Eternal Parents (無生父母; Wúshēng Fùmǔ). Patriarch Luo is considered an incarnation of the universal God by his followers.

=== Eschatology ===
The Three Suns (三阳; sānyáng) eschatological doctrine places itself in a tradition flourishing at least since the Ming dynasty. It can be traced back to a Hunyuan Taoist school named after the concept of hunyuan ("original undetermined") that existed before hundun ("coalesced undetermined") and is the beginning of primordial qi (yuanqi) according to some Taoist cosmologies. Although originally Taoist, these concepts became part of the folk tradition and were incorporated into the sects.

In the earliest sects of the Ming period, the Lord of the Original Chaos (混元主; Hùnyuánzhǔ) represents the origin of the universe developing through three stages, yang, or cosmic periods. In most sect scriptures, these three periods are known as Green Sun (qingyang), Red Sun (hongyang) and White Sun (baiyang). They are known by other names due to oral transmission of the teaching.

The earliest written evidence of this doctrine can be found in the Huangji jieguo baojuan, published in 1430. In this text the three stages are already associated to the three buddhas Dipankara, Gautama and Maitreya.

=== Practice and salvation ===
Based on Luo's writing, returning to Wusheng Laomu could be understood in two meanings. First, it means reaching a heavenly paradise after death, while the other meaning is that it symbolizes enlightenment, or attaining the state of Wusheng. Given the crucial role that meditation plays in the "Book of the Dragon Flower" (龍華經) as the way to salvation, it is evident that for the initiate the Native Place was not to be sought in some other worlds but within oneself through the realization of one's true nature.

In its development, Luoist sects had a kind of initiation process for its followers called “separate transmission outside the teachings” (教外別傳). There were three levels of initiation, where the initiated would be given verses and recite a kind of oath where the violator would be subject to supernatural punishment from the heavens. Early Luoist sects emphasized the importance of finding an enlightened master to transmit the way of salvation, an initiation ritual to open the mysterious door (玄關). The technical term for this initiation is referred to as “obtaining the dao” (得道). Patriarch Luo repeatedly assures that those who have been initiated (得道人) and become members of his community (道中人) will be saved.

In 1604, Fujianese officials described the spread of these groups teachings and their practices as “a spell at night in a secret room.” The aesthetic practices performed here were the opening of the sacred door (玄關), the transmission of secret mantras and the seal of the heart. The Luoist sect led by Yin Ji'nan strongly emphasized the importance of this sacred door opening. The transmission process is also said to free initiated followers from the gates of hell and those who guard the deceased spirit through it.

=== Vegetarianism ===
The followers of Luoism refused to eat meat as they believe that it involves the slaughter of living beings (causing bad karma) and do not drink alcohol as it causes loss of consciousness (causing attachment). The diet adopted by Zhaijiao of Luoism refers to the term Zhai (斋) which indicates an ideal Buddhist diet that avoids meat, fish, wine and five kinds of spices (onion, garlic, leeks, scallions, chives). Within imperial circles, the term indicate a series of purificatory practices that all participants in the Sacrifice at the Round Altar (i.e. the sacrifice offered to heaven by the emperor) must perform for three days prior to the event.

== See also ==
- Chinese religions of fasting
- Chinese salvationist religions
- Dacheng teaching of Mount Jizu
- Maitreya teachings
- Xiantiandao
- Yiguandao
- Sanyi teaching

== Sources ==
- Seiwert, Hubert Michael (2003), Popular Religious Movements and Heterodox Sects in Chinese History, Brill, ISBN 9004131469
- Ma, Xisha; Meng, Huiying (2011), Popular Religion and Shamanism, BRILL, ISBN 9004174559
- Nadeau, Randall L. (2012), The Wiley-Blackwell Companion to Chinese Religions, John Wiley & Sons
- ter Haar, Bernard J. (2015), A Lay Buddhist Movement in Late Imperial China, University of Hawai Press, ISBN 9780824853389
- Goossaert, Vincent, David Palmer (2011), The Religious Question in Modern China, University of Chicago Press, ISBN 0226304167
- Jones, Charles B (1999), Buddhism In Taiwan Religion And The State 1660-1990, Univ of Hawaii Pr, ISBN 0824820614
