= Huangjidao =

Chinese religion

Huangjidao (皇极道 "Way of the Imperial Pole" or "Imperial Ultimate") or Huangjiism (皇极教 Huáng jí jiào) is a Chinese folk religious sect that as of the 1980s was a proscribed religion in China as testified by the arrest of various leaders and members in those years.

== History ==
The Huangjidao members Zhou Jinfan and Tan Fangyou were arrested in Lichuan, Hubei, in the early 1980s. Their fate is unknown. Based on official records, Zhou was a long-time sympathiser of Huangjidao who unearthed a number of long-buried tracts, including the "Garden of the Great Harvest" and the "Precious Confession of the Ten Catastrophes". He transmitted them to another Huangjidao member, Tan Fangyou, who acquired additional texts and copied out by hand 20 volumes of such material, and distributed them in all directions to spread the faith.

The sect's doctrine includes the Three Suns belief about eschatology. Members become involved in the sect mainly as a means of cultivating their moral character and inner essence (xiushen yangxing). Some members avoid matrimony and engage in long-life techniques and martial arts to serve as the army of Huangjidao.

== See also ==
- Chinese salvationist religions

== Sources ==
- Munro, Robin; Mickey, Spiegel (1994). Detained in China and Tibet: A Directory of Political and Religious Prisoners. Human Rights Watch. ISBN 978-1564321053.
  - List first published in: "Appendix: Sects and Societies Recently or Currently Active in the PRC". Chinese Sociology & Anthropology. 21 (4): 103–104. 1989. doi:10.2753/CSA0009-46252104102.
