= Baguadao =

Network of Chinese folk religious sects

Eight Trigram Teaching 八卦教 Bāguàjiào
- Type: Chinese salvationist religion
- Scripture: Wunuchuandaoshu
- Founder: Liu Zuochen
- Origin: late 17th century Shandong
- Other names: Order of Heaven (天理教), Shouyuan (收元 Attaining Origin) sect, Wuhundao (五葷道), Baiyang (白阳 White Sun), Qingshui (清水 Pure Water) sect, Church of the Glorious Flower, (Note: 荣华会 Rónghuáhuì) Meihua (梅花 Plum Flower) sect

Baguadao (八卦道 (Note: 八卦道 Bāguàdào) "Way of the Eight Trigrams") or Eight Trigram Teaching (八卦教 (Note: 八卦教 Bāguàjiào)) or Attain Origin Sect (收元教) or Pure Water Sect (清水教) is a network of Chinese folk religious sects, one of the most extended in northern China. The tradition dates back to the late 17th century Ming dynasty, and was heavily persecuted during the following Qing dynasty when affiliated sects organised an uprising in 1813, led by Lin Qing. Affiliated sects appeared under various names, but during the latter half of the 18th century they adopted Bagua Jiao as their common designation.

The founder, or early influential leader of Baguadao was Liu Zuochen (†~1700), and the Liu family of Shandong maintained the leadership of the sect for decades. Baguadao networks were the first folk religions to develop "civil and martial work methods as one" (文武功法合一 wénwǔ gōng fǎ hé yī), and continue in contemporary Meihua (Plum Flower) practices.

== History ==
Little is known about the early history of the sect. In 1719 Liu Ruhan, a county magistrate by purchase in Shanxi was dismissed because his father Liu Zuochen was a member of the Shouyuandao (收元道 "Way to Attain the Origin"), (Note: Also 收元教 Shōuyuán jiào) possibly an early name for Baguadao prosecuted by imperial authority as part of the White Lotus heterodoxy. With probability, Liu Zuochen was the founder of Baguadao, after having changed his original name Li Tingyu. At first he had only three disciples: a man surnamed Qin from Qingfeng County, of whom nothing is known; Gao Yunlong of Shangqiu, in Henan, who founded the Ligua (Li Trigram) subdivision; and Wang Qingrong from Heze, in Shandong, who founded the Zhengua (Zhen Trigram) subdivision. The Liu family held the role of the highest masters within the Baguadao for four generations.

Historians reconstruct that Liu Zuochen died around 1701, and Liu Ruhan his son became the new head master of the Baguadao. By the 1730s the sect had developed its characteristic structure, with branches corresponding to the eight trigrams each led by a leader subordinate to Master Liu, two assistants for every leader of a trigram, and cohorts of believers. During the first year of Qianlong (1736) Liu Ruhan died and his son Liu Ke became the new leader of the Baguadao, which under his guidance grew extensively.

In 1748, the thirteenth year of Qianlong, the leadership passed to Liu Shennguo, Liu Ke's son. In 1772 the then leader of the Zhengua subdivision named Wang Zhong was arrested in Shandong and the book in his possession, Xunshu ("Book of Instruction"), was found to contain references to the overthrowing of the "barbarian" Manchu dynasty. Wang Zhong was executed for refusing to reveal the name of the leader of Baguadao, but another member later confessed that he was one of the Lius in Shan County of Shandong. After investigation, Liu Shengguo was arrested and executed. The authorities discovered the vast network of Baguadao sects, with branches named after the eight trigrams of cosmology.

Even after the arrest of Liu Shengguo the holy significance of the Liu family did not diminish, and minor leaders of the Baguadao continued to rely upon legitimation by the Master Liu of the day. After the 1772 crackdown, Liu Shengguo's successor Liu Tingxian was banished to the northeastern land of Xinjiang where he served as a peasant; in 1780 a leader of the Zhengua branch of Baguadao sent messengers to Xinjiang to get into contact with Liu Tingxian and convinced him to take his legitimate position as main leader of the religion. In the following decades Liu Tingxian and his sons continued the Baguadao leadership in Xinjiang, and lesser sect masters in the east continued to financially support the Liu leadership in Xinjiang through the 1800s.

== Beliefs and practices ==
The "Writing about Five Women's Transmission of the Way" (五女传道输 Wǔnǚchuándàoshū) is the core scripture of Baguadao, and reveals a technique of neidan meditation to attain blessing, overcome human limits and reach salvation. Liu Zuochen is described in the scripture as the incarnation of Maitreya, the sun that enlightens the whole world, the son of the Eternal Venerable Mother. Palmer and Liu (2012) have studied the contents of the Baguadao as a tradition of orthodox and elaborate forms of Taoist self-cultivation techniques.

== Subdivisions ==
=== Early seven major divisions ===
The eight trigrams' cosmology was adopted as an ideal system of organisation as described in many precious scriptures of the 16th century. Within the ideal division into eight trigrams, only three of them (Zhengua, Ligua and Kangua) were influential, and there were further subdivisions which used a variety of names. For instance, the sect led by Wang Zhong, whose arrest in 1772 led to the detection of Liu Shengguo and the exile of the Lius to Xinjiang, was called the Pure Water (清水 Qingshui) (Note: 清水教 Qīngshuǐ jiào) group, and was part of the Zhen Trigram branch.

The major subdivisions as of the thirteenth year of Qianlong (1748) were seven, corresponding to seven out of the eight trigrams, leaving out the ☷ Kungua (坤卦) which never developed:

- ☲ The Ligua or Li Trigram sect (离卦教 (Note: 离卦教 Líguà jiào)), with headquarters in Shangqiu, Henan, under the leadership of Gao Da (郜大), third-generation descendant of the founder Gao Yunlong (郜云陇);
- ☳ The Zhengua or Zhen Trigram sect (震卦教 (Note: 震卦教 Zhènguà jiào)), with headquarters in Heze, Shandong, but well developed in Henan, Zhili and Jiangnan, under the leadership of Wang Zhong (王中);
- ☵ The Kangua or Kan Trigram sect (坎卦教 (Note: 坎卦教 Kǎnguà jiào)), with headquarters in Rongcheng and Ningyang County (then both in Zhili), led by Zhang Bo (张柏) and Kong Wanlin (孔万林);
- ☶ The Gengua or Gen Trigram sect (艮卦教 (Note: 艮卦教 Gěnguà jiào)), with headquarters in Jinxiang, Shandong, and leadership position held by Zhang Yucheng (张玉成) and Zhang Jing'an (张静安), respectively father and son;
- ☴ The Xungua or Xun Trigram sect (巽卦教 (Note: 巽卦教 Xùnguà jiào)), with headquarters in Shan, Shandong, under the leadership of Zhang Yan (张炎);
- ☰ The Qiangua or Qian Trigram sect (乾卦教 (Note: 乾卦教 Qiánguà jiào)), having headquarters in Yucheng, Henan, under the leadership of Zhang Xing (张姓);
- ☱ The Duigua or Dui Trigram sect (兌卦教 (Note: 兌卦教 Duìguà jiào)), with headquarters in Dongming, then Zhili, and leadership held by Chen Shanshan (陈善山).

==== Ligua tradition ====
One of the most influential branches of the Baguadao was the Ligua (Li Trigram) transmission. The Li Trigram branch was more involved in the 1813 uprising against the Qing dynasty. Lin Qing founded many groups of the Li subdivision, many of which connected to the Gao family of Henan who held the central leadership of the subdivision. Under increasing persecutions Lin Qing reacted by organising a rebellion, which broke out in the 1813 uprising, which culminated in an attack to the Forbidden City in Beijing. The Gao family members were captured and by the confession of the current leader Gao Tianyou the history of the Li branch was traced back to Gao Yunlong, who was initiated by Liu Zuochen himself a century earlier.

=== Late 19th century: Heavenly Dragon Baguajiao ===
In 1860 the heritage of Baguadao gave rise to a new movement, the Heavenly Dragon Baguajiao (天龙八卦教 Tiānlóng Bāguàjiào). The religion was centered in Qiu County in modern Hebei and Shen County in Shandong, and was led by Yang Tai (杨泰) and Song Jingshi (宋景诗). The new organisation grouped the eight trigram divisions in five coloured banners: the White Banner (白旗 báiqí) comprising Qian and Dui sects, the Yellow Banner (黄旗 huángqí) comprising Kun and Gen sects, the Green Banner (绿旗 lǜqí) comprising Zhen and Shun sects, the Red Banner (红旗 hóngqí) comprising Li sects, and the Blue Banner (蓝旗 lánqí) or Black Banner (黑旗 hēiqí) comprising Kan sects. A sixth banner was the Flower Banner (花旗 huāqí).

=== Contemporary development: Meihuaism ===
The contemporary popular sect of the Plum Flower (梅花教 (Note: 梅花教 Méihuājiào)) widespread in north China, which combines the martial aspect (武场 wuchang) of meihuaquan, and a civil aspect (文场 wenchang), has been studied as the continuation of the Baguadao and especially of the Ligua tradition, which was the first folk religion to see the "civil and martial work methods as one" (文武功法合一 wénwǔ gōng fǎ hé yī). Meihua followers were directly involved in the anti-Western Boxer Rebellion.

The Plum Flower religion and martial art is practiced freely in contemporary China with a large holy see established in March 2015 in Pingxiang County of Hebei. Scholar Raymond P. Ambrosi has studied the engagement of Meihua communities in embedding adherents in horizontal social networks which reconstruct grassroots civil society.

== See also ==
- Chinese folk religion
- Chinese salvationist religions
- Boxer Rebellion

== Sources ==
- Ambrosi, Raymond P. (2015). "Interconnections amongst Folk Religions, Civil Society and Community Development: Meihua Boxers as Constructors of Social Trust and the Agrarian Public Sphere". Modern China. Sage Publishing.
- Zhu, Weizheng (2015). Rereading Modern Chinese History. BRILL. ISBN 978-9004293311.
- Palmer, David A.; Liu, Xun (2012). Daoism in the Twentieth Century: Between Eternity and Modernity. University of California Press.
- Seiwert, Hubert Michael (2003). Popular Religious Movements and Heterodox Sects in Chinese History. Brill. ISBN 9004131469.
- Zhang, Guodong; Green, Thomas A.; Gutiérrez-García, Carlos (2016). "Rural Community, Group Identity and Martial Arts: Social Foundation of Meihuaquan". Ido Movement for Culture. Journal of Martial Arts Anthropology. 16 (1): 18–29. doi:10.14589/ido.16.1.3.
