= Tianguangdao =

Tianguangdao (天光道 "Way of the Heavenly Light") is a Chinese folk religious sect that as of the 1980s was a proscribed religion in China. Particularly active in Heilongjiang and Anhui, there are records of detentions of leaders and members easpecially from the former province.

== History ==
Wang Xianyao, a school teacher who became a leader of the Tianguangdao, was arrested in Heilongjiang in the early 1980s. His fate is unknown. According to official report, he was a teacher at the Xingtong Middle School of Wanjinshan Commune in Baode County. At the time of the arrest he was 32 years old and college-educated.

Zhang Desheng, another Tianguangdao leader, was arrested in Baoqing County of Heilongjiang in the 1980s. In Anhui the sect instituted a system of financial rewarding for every member who would have converted new people.

== See also ==
- Chinese salvationist religions

== Sources ==
- Munro, Robin; Mickey, Spiegel (1994). Detained in China and Tibet: A Directory of Political and Religious Prisoners. Human Rights Watch. ISBN 978-1564321053.
  - List first published in: "Appendix: Sects and Societies Recently or Currently Active in the PRC". Chinese Sociology & Anthropology. 21 (4): 103–104. 1989. doi:10.2753/CSA0009-46252104102.
