= Huazhaidao =

Huazhaidao (华斋道 "Way of Flowers and Fasting") is a Chinese folk religious sect of Henan that as of the 1980s was a proscribed religion in China as testified by the arrest of various Communist Party members who joined the sect in those years.

== History ==
Yang Sende (or Desen) and Yang Maicun were two members of the sect who were arrested in Linzhou, Henan, in the 1980s. According to official reports, Sende was a brigade leader and Communist Party member since 1946. The Yangs spread the teachings of the Huazhaidao sect by claiming their efficacy in healing the sick. In Linzhou they persuaded dozens of Communist Party members and local civil servants to join the Huazhaidao.

== See also ==
- Chinese salvationist religions

== Sources ==
- Munro, Robin; Mickey, Spiegel (1994). Detained in China and Tibet: A Directory of Political and Religious Prisoners. Human Rights Watch. ISBN 978-1564321053.
  - List first published in: "Appendix: Sects and Societies Recently or Currently Active in the PRC". Chinese Sociology & Anthropology. 21 (4): 103–104. 1989. doi:10.2753/CSA0009-46252104102.
