= Zhongyongdao =

Zhongyongdao (中庸道 "Way of the Golden Mean") is a Chinese folk religious sect that as of the 1980s was a proscribed religion in China as testified by the arrest of one of its leaders, Tang Tianxu, in Sichuan in 1981.

== History ==
Tang Tianxu was a leader of Zhongyingdao who was arrested in the Kaijiang County of Sichuan in 1981. It is not known what sentence he received. According to an official report, in June of that year Tang gathered a "Thunder Patriarch Assembly", a religious gathering, binding together over ten thousands sticks of incense to create one great "heavenly incense". On that occasion he instructed the people about eschatology, proclaiming the end of the jiazi and a new emperor to come.

== See also ==
- Chinese salvationist religions

== Sources ==
- Munro, Robin; Mickey, Spiegel (1994). Detained in China and Tibet: A Directory of Political and Religious Prisoners. Human Rights Watch. ISBN 978-1564321053.
  - List first published in: "Appendix: Sects and Societies Recently or Currently Active in the PRC". Chinese Sociology & Anthropology. 21 (4): 103–104. 1989. doi:10.2753/CSA0009-46252104102.
