= Jiugongdao =

Chinese folk religious sect

Jiugongdao (九宫道 "Way of the Nine Palaces") is a Chinese folk religious sect centered in the Wutai County of the province of Shanxi. The name of the sect is based on the jiugong diagram of esoteric cosmology.

Flourishing in the Qing dynasty, but rooted in earlier times, the Jiugongdao developed greatly on Mount Wutai thanks to the efforts of Li Xiangshan, also known as Puji, his name as a Buddhist monk who was close to the Manchu court. With his contribution, Jiugongdao took over more than twenty run down former Buddhist monasteries on Mount Wutai and rebuilt them thanks to the donations of its strong following, especially concentrated in northeast China. The monasteries were reformed into Chinese temples dedicated to indigenous deities and the cosmological Lords of the Five Peaks. The sect also gathered a following among Khorchin Mongols.

In the 1920s and 1930s, economic insecurity contributed to the major growth of new religious movements in China. Jiugongdao was among the largest such groups in this period, along with Yiguandao, Society for the Common Good, and Xiantiandao (the Way of Former Heaven).

The Jiugongdao declined on Mount Wutai in the 1940s, as a Han Chinese-acquired tradition of Tibetan Buddhism took power. With the campaigns against religion in the 1950s and the Cultural Revolution, Jiugongdao and other folk religious sects focused on Mount Wutai, Huanxiangdao and Houtiandao, were persecuted and went underground. They have revived since the 1980s.

== See also ==
- Chinese salvationist religions
- Chinese folk religion

== Sources ==
- Jones, Stephen (2013). In Search of the Folk Daoists of North China. Ashgate Publishing. ISBN 978-1409481300.
- Charleux, Isabelle (2015). Nomads on Pilgrimage: Mongols on Wutaishan (China), 1800-1940. Brill. ISBN 978-9004297784.
