= Church of the Highest Supreme =

Chinese folk religious sect

The Church of the Highest Supreme (太上会 Tàishànghuì; or "Most Supreme", "Most High"; also known as 太上门 Tàishàngmén, the "Gate of the Highest Supreme") is a Chinese folk religious sect of northern China. The origins of the sect are obscure, although Thomas David Dubois traces it to the theological tradition of the networks of Hongyangism (弘阳教), another northern folk religious sect which has been officially registered under the auspices of the Chinese Taoist Association since the 1990s.

Extensive fieldwork by Dubois in the late 1990s and early 2000s has produced documentation about the Church of the Highest Supreme as the most influential folk religious sect in rural counties of Hebei, followed by the Church of the Heaven and the Earth. These two religions "energetically revived" in rural Hebei since the late 1970s, with the tacit approval of the local government, after pressures from campaigns against some sects in the 1950s and the cessation of any public religious activity in the years of the Cultural Revolution.

The Church of the Highest Supreme and the other sects of north China provide ceremonies for public and private religious life of local populations, and their ritual specialists are portrayed as moral exemplars and earnest sources of knowledge about the sacred.

== Lineage and history ==
Dubois traces the origin of the Church of the Highest Supreme to the Hunyuan (混元 "Primordial Undetermined") sect, another name of Hongyangism ("Red Sun", "Great Sun / Yang" sect, also known as Shouyuan, "Return to the Origin" sect). They are furtherly traced back to the Wuweiism transmitted by the influential leader Zhang Jindou in early-18th century Shanxi.

Zhang Jindou's disciples Feng Jinjing and Tian Jintai founded, respectively, the Hunyuan and Shouyuan. These two missionary lines intertwined and proliferated over the 18th and 19th century across China, characterised by autonomy given to local networks and the ability to function as stable local institutions uninterested in political intrigues and therefore not clashing with the government.

Although certain folk religious sects were officially outlawed for hundreds of years in imperial China, this was not the case of the Church of the Highest Supreme and other sects which were primarily concerned for local welfare. This changed with the establishment of the People's Republic of China after 1949, when political project deeply penetrated village society. The first sweeping anti-religious campaign was directed against the Yiguandao, which had spread rapidly throughout the country. Yiguandao and other primarily urban religious movements were seen as alien teachings by village populations, and many were happy to see them eradicated.

The Church of the Highest Supreme and other localised religions were never labeled "reactionary" like Yiguandao, that would have necessitated their eradication. As they were never antagonistic to the new state, and their members fought against the Japanese occupation, the communists were careful not to undermine this base of support. During the years when public religious activities were forbidden as backward thinking and the climate became tense for folk religious sects, the Church of the Highest Supreme and the other sects were driven underground.

The Cultural Revolution from 1966 to 1976 saw the complete cessation of religious expression throughout China. Although they were never purged completely, the effects of this ten years-long hiatus shaped the revival of the Church of the Highest Supreme and other folk religious groups during the 1980s, which required reinvention of rituals and restructuration of social roles.

== Theology ==
The theology and ritual practice of the Church of the Highest Supreme gives centrality to the Venerable Ancestor of the Primordial Undetermined (混元老祖 Hùnyuán Lǎozǔ), the son of the Wusheng Laomu (Unborn Venerable Mother), architect of the Goddess' salvation of her purest children. This theology is shared with Hongyangism and related sects.

== See also ==
- Chinese folk religion
- Chinese folk religious sects
- Luoism

== Sources ==
- Dubois, Thomas David (2005). The Sacred Village: Social Change and Religious Life in Rural North China (PDF). University of Hawaii Press. ISBN 0824828372. Archived from the original (PDF) on 14 February 2016.
- Goossaert, Vincent; David Palmer. The Religious Question in Modern China. University of Chicago Press, 2011. ISBN 0226304167
