= Way of the Gods according to the Confucian Tradition =

Confucian congregational religious movement

The Way of the Gods according to the Confucian Tradition (Chinese: 儒宗神教; pinyin: Rúzōng Shénjiào), also called the Luandao (鸾道; "Phoenix Way" or 鸾门; Luánmén; "Phoenix Gate") or Luanism (鸾教; Luánjiào) or—from the name of its cell congregations—the phoenix halls or phoenix churches (鸾堂; luántáng), is a Confucian congregational religious movement of the Chinese traditional beliefs.

The first phoenix hall was established in Magong, the capital of the Penghu Islands, in 1853, and from there the movement spread throughout mainland China and Taiwan. Other names of the movement are Rumen (儒门; "Confucian Gate[way]") or Holy Church of the Confucian Tradition (儒宗圣教; Rúzōng Shèngjiào).

The aim of the phoenix halls is to honour the gods through Confucian orthopraxy (儒; rú) style, spreading morality through public lectures and divinely-inspired books (善书; shànshū). The Confucian Way of the Gods is defined as Houtiandao (后天道; "Way of Later Heaven" or "Way of the Manifested") by the antagonistic Xiantiandao (先天道; "Way of Former Heaven" or "Way of the Primordial") traditions, which claim to be closer to the God of the universe.

== Theory and doctrine ==
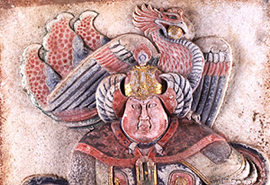
The fenghuang as a detail of a 10th-century Chinese relief.

The phoenix halls are concerned with the salvation of the disciples, which basically means deification. This is worked on in a long process of "cultivating the Way" (Tao), that is the right mode of living through the basic virtues of benevolence (ren), righteousness (yi), propriety (li), and filial piety (xiao).

Realising the virtues one reaches the state of continuous sincerity (cheng) and peace and purity of mind (jing), proceeding successfully in the cultivation of one's inner numinous nature (lingxing). The cultivation of the Way is conceptualised as a path of learning. The symbol of the phoenix represents spiritual renewal of the disciple and the social community.

== History and influences ==
The tradition of the phoenix halls started in 1853 when a fuji-inspired cult was established in Magong, the capital of the Penghu archipelago between Fujian and Taiwan. Magong intellectuals sent a prominent tongji to Quanzhou, in Fujian, to learn the practice of fuji from the local Society for Public Goodness (公善社; Gōngshànshè). When the tongji returned in the same year he established the Society for Universal Exhortation (普劝社; Pǔquànshè) to recreate moral conduct, proclaiming the Sacred Edict.

The activities of the society dwindled over the years, especially during the Sino-French War. It was later reformed as the Society for Complete Renewal (一新社; Yīxīnshè) by six government students, in 1887. It held regular public lecturing sessions given by carefully chosen lecturers (jiangsheng) who expounded the Sacred Edict and other morality books.

The texts composed between 1891 and 1903 were collected and published as a single volume entitled the "Consciousness of the Mysterious Heart" (觉悟玄心; Juéwù xuánxīn). At the same time, similar activities were promoted by literati in the Yilan County of northern Taiwan; the Yilan cults were extremely active and spawned new groups throughout northern and central Taiwan.

Phoenix halls are a variant of two types of religious organisations, patronised by local intellectual elites, that flourished in mainland China since the 19th century, in a period of profound social, political and cultural change: Taoist god-writing (fuji) cults usually focused upon a particular immortal, and salvationist charitable societies.

In Taoist societies, the relationship between members and their deity follows the model of disciples and master, with the goal of immortality through self-cultivation. Phoenix halls inherit this internal structure combined with the conservative social reformism of the charitable societies. They are concerned with a salvation of society through the reaffirmation of traditional standards of morality.

In the 1920s, phoenix halls in Sichuan adopted the name of "Confucian shrines" (儒坛; rú tán). In the same years, under the influence of the medium Yang Mingji, phoenix halls in northern Taiwan began to unify under the name "Way of the Gods according to the Confucian Tradition" (儒宗神教; Rúzōng Shénjiào) and the liturgical manual Rúmén kēfàn (儒门科范; "Liturgical Regulations of the Confucian Way") published in 1937. Effective unification came after the retrocession of Taiwan in 1945; the "Republic of China Assembly of the Way of the Gods according to the Confucian Traditio" (中华民国儒宗神教会; Zhōnghuá Mínguó Rúzōng Shénjiào Huì) was created in 1978 incorporating over five hundred phoenix halls. A new ritual book, the "Sacred Code of the Phoenix Halls" (鸾堂圣典; Luántáng shèngdiǎn) was published in 1979.

While early phoenix halls showed ritual patterns inherited from Taoist cults and Longhua vegetarian halls, since the formation of the Assembly of the Phoenix Halls in 1978 "new-style" urban phoenix halls, such as the Shenxian Tang and the Wumiao Mingzheng Tang, strengthened a Confucian style omitting Taoist and Longhua-derived rituals. The tradition of the Wumiao Mingzheng Tang was influenced by Xuanyuanism and Yiguandao. The book "The Mysterious Meaning of the Way of Heaven" (天道奥义; Tiāndào àoyì), published in the 1980s by the Wumiao Mingzheng Tang, incorporates Wusheng Laomu, the central concept of Yiguandao and broader Chinese Maternism.

== See also ==
- Chinese folk religion
- Confucianism
- Confucian church
- New religious movement
- Xuanyuanism
- Shendao

== Sources ==
- Philip Clart. University of Missouri-Columbia. Confucius and the Mediums: Is There a "Popular Confucianism"?. On: T'uong Pao LXXXIX. Brill, Leiden, 2003.
- Philip Clart. University of British Columbia. The Phoenix and the Mother: The Interaction of Spirit Writing Cults and Popular Sects in Taiwan. On: Journal of Chinese Religions, Fall 1997, n. 25.
- Philip Clart, Charles B. Jones. Religion in Modern Taiwan: Tradition and Innovation in a Changing Society. University of Hawaii Press, 2003. ISBN 0824825640
