= Yellow Sand Society =

19th and 20th century secret society and religious sect in China

- Chinese: 黃沙會; Wade–Giles: Huang Sha Hui
- The Yellow Sands are known to have used a yellow flag inscribed with their leaders' names during the insurgency in Anyang County 1919–22.
- Dates active: 19th–20th century
- Active regions: Northern China (Henan, Shandong, Hebei)
- Ideology: Militant self-defense and tax resistance; Heterodox folk religion; Ming millenarian monarchism

The Yellow Sand Society (Note: Alternatively translated as Yellow Pebbles Society or Yellow Sand Sect) (Chinese: 黃沙會; Wade–Giles: Huang Sha Hui), also known as Yellow Way Society (Chinese: 黃道會; Wade–Giles: Huang Tao Hui), and Yellow Gate Society (Chinese: 黃門會; Wade–Giles: Huang Men Hui), was a rural secret society and folk religious sect in northern China during the 19th and 20th century.

Inspired by millenarian ideas, the movement launched several uprisings against the late Qing Empire, the Republic of China, and the Chinese puppet states of Japan. The Yellow Sands were eventually suppressed by the Chinese Communist Party (CCP) in the second half of the 20th century.

== History ==
=== Origins ===
Similar to other secret societies in China, the exact origins and operations of the Yellow Sand Society are difficult to discern. Chinese secret societies occasionally changed names, and were highly decentralized, with several differently named branches operating as part of the same movement. Sometimes, completely unrelated groups also shared the same name. It is thus difficult to clearly differentiate between the secret societies. The Yellow Sands are known to have operated as "Yellow Way Society" for part of their existence and have also been equated with the "Yellow Gate Society", which was active in Jinan, Shandong. In turn, "Yellow Gate Society" served as an alternative name for the Yellow Spears, a sub-group of the Red Spear Society. Consequently, the Yellow Sands have been characterized both as offshoot and predecessor of the Red Spear Society. It has also been theorized that the Yellow Sand Society was connected to the White Lotus movement.

The Yellow Sands were already active in the late Qing Empire, having possibly emerged as rural self-defense movement in reaction to the gradual decline of the Chinese government and the subsequent rise of banditry and chaos. By the late 19th century, they flourished in the isolated Guan County, Shandong, at the border to Henan. The Yellow Sand Society would continue to be most active in the border area of Henan, Shandong, and Hebei for the rest of its existence.

In 1908, peasants in eastern Henan banded together and organized themselves as the "Yellow Way Society" in opposition to the Qing government. Three years later, these peasants started an open rebellion in an attempt to support the Xinhai Revolution. They captured and plundered Taikang. They were defeated thereafter, with about 1,000 Yellow Way insurgents killed.

=== Republican China ===
Following the collapse of the Qing Empire, the Yellow Way Society opposed the new Republican government. This was unusual, for most secret societies chose to cooperate with the new regime until the mid-1920s. Around 1919, a man calling himself "Chu the Ninth" appeared in Anyang County of northern Henan. Claiming to be the ninth-generation descendant of the Ming dynasty, he proclaimed himself Emperor of China with the era name "Great Brightness" (Daming). In doing so, Chu was supported by a local Yellow Way teacher. The two jointly declared that China had to be reunified under the "true dragon [rightful emperor]" and that only Yellow Way Society members would be spared in the coming armageddon; their insurgency against the government lasted three years and was finally suppressed by Republican militia and army forces. (Note: Ming pretenders were actually common in Anyang County during the early Republic of China. For example, just two years after the defeat of "Chu the Ninth", a man calling himself "Wang the Sixth" proclaimed himself Ming emperor and managed to gather three hundred adherents before being captured.) Thereafter the movement resumed calling itself the Yellow Sand Society and continued to organize rural communities to resist increasing taxation and government intrusion for the rest of the Warlord Era.

In course of the Kuomintang (KMT)'s Northern Expedition 1926–28, the power of the warlords in northern China weakened significantly. This prompted the Yellow Sands, alongside other rural groups like the Red Spears and Heavenly Gates, to seize large areas for themselves. For example, these three secret societies captured Cheng'an County in 1927 and proceeded to run the local government for several months. Although the secret societies were thus fighting the same enemies as the KMT, the latter regarded this development unfavorably. This was due to the KMT-led Nationalist government fearing that the Yellow Sands and other rural groups would hinder their own tax collections just as they had resisted the warlords' taxation.

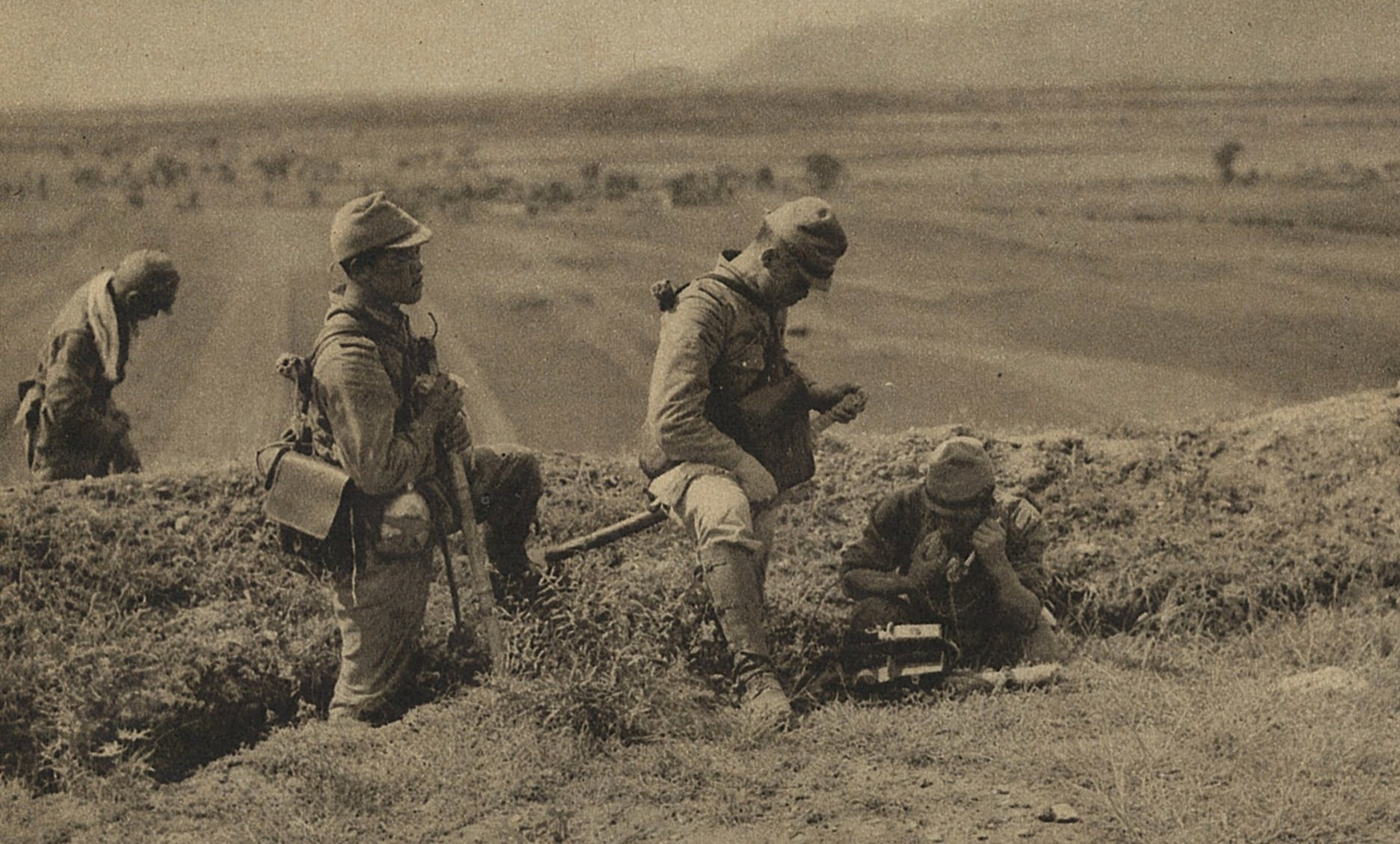
The 1936 rebellion of Yellow Sands in Miyun District was crushed by the Imperial Japanese Army (pictured: Japanese soldiers in 1937)

The Yellow Sand Society also took part in the Chinese resistance against the Empire of Japan, which increasingly occupied Chinese territory in the 1930s. One branch of the movement was reorganized by its leader Chang Yin-tang into the "People's Anti-Japanese National Salvation Self-Defence Corps", based at Taocheng in southern Hebei. Another Yellow Sand faction launched an uprising against the East Hebei Autonomous Council, a puppet state of Japan, in July 1936. Led by an old Taoist priest, the Yellow Sands managed to defeat an East Hebei Army unit that was sent to suppress them in Miyun District, whereupon the Imperial Japanese Army mobilized to crush the uprising. By September, the Yellow Sand forces in Miyun had been defeated by the Japanese, with about 300 rebels killed or wounded in battle.

As peasant organization, the Yellow Sand Society was among the secret societies that also attracted the Chinese Communist Party (CCP)'s attention. In December 1942, CCP leader Li Ta-chang released a paper which detailed how Communist cadres should deal with rural secret societies, grouping them into three categories. The Yellow Sands were considered to be a "feudal organization" led by landlords, but also important potential allies in the war against the Japanese. Li argued that Communists should join the secret societies and covertly indoctrinate them, and only attack those groups that adamantly refused to adopt Communism. Over time, however, the Communists became increasingly frustrated with the secret societies' political conservatism and refusal to adopt Communist ideas, so that the CCP increasingly shifted from cooperating with the rural groups to undermining and dismantling them.

=== Suppression by the Communist Party ===
With the CCP's victory in the Chinese Civil War and the People's Republic of China's establishment in 1949, the secret societies were seen as a political threat. As result, the CCP started to purge Mainland China of them, violently curtailing their activities. The Yellow Sand Society was consequently suppressed as a seditious "sect". Nevertheless, remnants of the movement remained active as late as 1980, when three peasants were arrested as purported Yellow Sands. They were accused of having planned a rebellion and the reestablishment of the Taiping Heavenly Kingdom, and reportedly resisted arrest. In the ensuing altercation, eight policemen were injured before the purported Yellow Sands were taken into custody. All were sentenced to unknown terms of imprisonment.

== Beliefs ==
The Yellow Sand Society, like many other Chinese secret societies, was inspired in its activities by millenarian, spiritual and romanticised monarchist ideas. Its members believed that they could become immune to gunfire through "magic and incantations", a belief that was widely shared among secret societies. Historian Elizabeth J. Perry noted that this conviction of invulnerability was "a powerful weapon for bolstering the resolve of people who possessed few alternative resources with which to defend their meager holdings".

The Yellow Sands also aimed at the restoration of the Ming dynasty. This too was a common motive among Chinese secret societies, often expressed in the slogan "Oppose the Qing; restore the Ming". This slogan remained popular in rural areas even after the Qing dynasty's fall and was still widely used in the 1940s. The rule of the Ming dynasty represented an idealized time, and it was widely believed that a Ming restoration would result in a "reign of happiness and justice for all" under a "good sovereign".

== See also ==
- Secret society

== Bibliography ==
- Billingsley, Phil (1988). Bandits in Republican China. Stanford, California: Stanford University Press.
- Buck, David D. (August 1977). "Reviewed Work: The Red Spears, 1916-1949 by Tai Hsuan-chih". The Journal of Asian Studies. 36 (4). Cambridge: Cambridge University Press: 729–731. doi:10.2307/2054450. JSTOR 2054450.
- Chesneaux, Jean (1972). "Secret Societies in China's Historical Evolution". In Jean Chesneaux (ed.). Popular Movements and Secret Societies in China 1840–1950. Stanford, California: Stanford University Press. pp. 1–21.
- Esherick, Joseph W. (1987). The Origins of the Boxer Uprising. Berkeley, California; Los Angeles; London: University of California Press.
- Huang, Philip (1985). The Peasant Economy and Social Change in North China. Stanford, California: Stanford University Press.
- Ji, Xiaofeng; Shen, Youyi (1997). Supplements to the historical materials of the Republic of China. Beijing. ISBN 9787563320875.
- Liu, Cheng-yun (1983). The Ko-lao Hui in late imperial China. Pittsburgh: University of Pittsburgh.
- Munro, Robin; Spiegel, Mickey (1994). Detained in China and Tibet: A Directory of Political and Religious Prisoners. Human Rights Watch. ISBN 1564321053.
- Morning Tribune Staff (30 July 1936). "Yellow Sand Cult to be suppressed by Japanese". Morning Tribune. Vol. 1, no. 154. Peiping. p. 9.
- Novikov, Boris (1972). "The Anti-Manchu Propaganda of the Triads, ca. 1800–1860". In Jean Chesneaux (ed.). Popular Movements and Secret Societies in China 1840–1950. Stanford, California: Stanford University Press. pp. 49–63.
- Tai, Hsüan-chih (1985). The Red Spears, 1916-1949. Ann Arbor, Michigan: Centre for Chinese Studies Publications, University of Michigan.
- Thaxton, Ralph (1984). "The fate of the Heavenly Gates: rebellion, religion and repression in Republican China". In János M. Bak; Gerhard Benecke (eds.). Religion and Rural Revolt. Manchester: Manchester University Press. pp. 373–389.
- Thaxton, Ralph A. (1997). Salt of the Earth: The Political Origins of Peasant Protest and Communist Revolution in China. Berkeley, California; Los Angeles; London: University of California Press.
- The China Monthly Review Staff (20 August 1936). ""Yellow Sand" Society Suppressed by Japanese in Demilitarized Zone". The China Monthly Review. Vol. 77. Custom House, Shanghai. p. 473.
- Perry, Elizabeth J. (1980). Rebels and Revolutionaries in North China, 1845–1945. Stanford, California: Stanford University Press.
- Slawinski, Roman (1975). La Société des Piques Rouges et le mouvement paysan en Chine en 1926-1927 (in French). Warsaw: University of Warsaw.
- Slawinski, Roman (1972). "The Red Spears in the Late 1920s". In Jean Chesneaux (ed.). Popular Movements and Secret Societies in China 1840-1950. Stanford, California: Stanford University Press. pp. 201–211.
- Xing, Hansan; Li, Guoqiang (1991). "YUDONG HUANGDAO HUI QIYI" [The uprising of the Huangdao Hui in east Henan in 1911]. Shixue Yuekan (Journal of Historical Science) (in Chinese). 5: 64–69.
