= Dacheng teaching of Mount Jizu =

Dacheng teaching of Mount Jizu (鸡足山大乘教 Jīzú shān dàchéng jiào, "Great Vehicle teaching of Mount Jizu"), is a Chinese folk religious sect, a branch of Luoism in western China established by Zhang Baotai (張保太) in the late 17th century, during the Manchu-ruled Qing dynasty.

The sect originated in Mount Jizu, Yunnan, near Qing's border with the Burmese Taungoo dynasty. Many in the sect also advocated for the restoration of the Chinese-ruled Ming dynasty in China. It grew quickly in many southern Chinese regions and was behind a few rebellions in the 1730s and 1740s which were ruthlessly suppressed.

In 1746 the Qianlong Emperor officially banned the Dacheng religions, a year after Zhang died in prison. Many followers from Yunnan fled to Burma.

== See also ==
- Chinese folk religion
- Chinese salvationist religions
- Luoism

== Sources ==
- Ma, Jianxiong (2013). The Lahu Minority in Southwest China: A Response to Ethnic Marginalization on the Frontier. Routledge (published 4 September 2012). ISBN 9780415505581.
- Seiwert, Hubert; Ma, Xisha (January 2003). Popular Religious Movements and Heterodox Sects in Chinese History. Brill Academic Pub (published June 2003). ISBN 9789004131460.
