= The Precious Scroll of the Immortal Maiden Equal to Heaven =

Chinese religious text

The Precious Scroll of the Immortal Maiden Equal to Heaven is a baojuan (precious scroll) that originates from Western Gansu, China. It narrates the life and miracles of the Immortal Maiden, a deity that was widely venerated in Zhangye and elsewhere in the Gansu Corridor. The first 6 chapters are about her mortal life and how she achieved her divine status by her active piety, her persistent meditation, and her spectacular death during a flood. The next 6 chapters narrate how she rescued the Chinese from the Tatars, first by saving the Chinese general Huo Qubing from his enemies by creating a bridge across the Black River, which allowed him to escape, and next by inflicting three plagues on the Tatars who tried to demolish her temple in revenge. The final chapters narrate how she supports public morals among the Chinese by protecting a poor student from murder, by turning an unfilial daughter-in-law into a dog, by extending the life of a good Samaritan, and by saving a poor widow and her son from the shenanigans of her husband's brother who tries to steal their inheritance. There is a printed edition dated 1698. A later addition includes more miracles.
