= Eight Trigrams uprising of 1813 =

Chinese anti-Qing rebellion

Eight Triagrams Uprising
- Part of Qing Rule in China
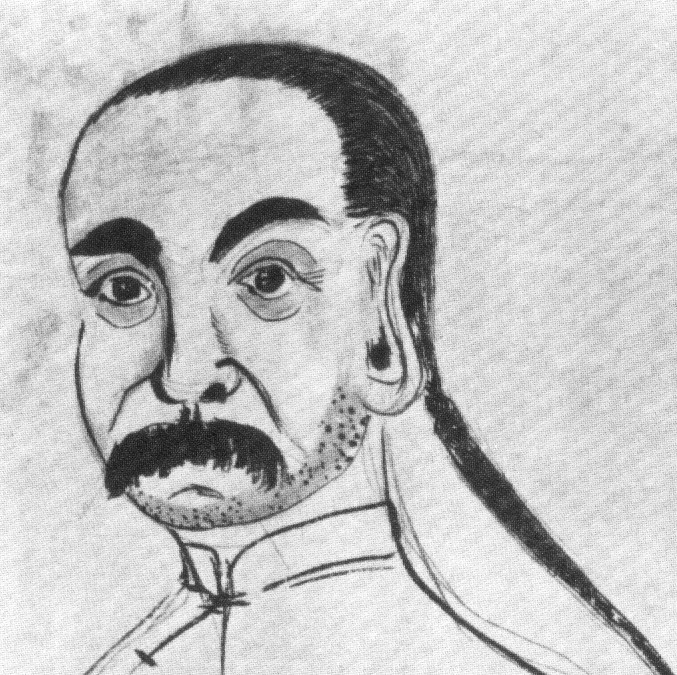
- Lin Qing, head of the sect and leader of the uprising
| Date | 1813 |
| Location | Forbidden City, Beijing Henan Shandong |
| Result | Qing Victory |
| Territorial changes | Uprising Suppressed: The territory occupied by the rebel army was recovered by the Qing army |

Belligerents
| Baguadao | Great Qing: Imperial Guards Brigade |

Commanders and leaders
| Lin Qing (executed); Li Wencheng ‡‡ | Jiaqing Emperor; Prince Mianning; Prince Cheng (Zairui); Prince Mianzhi |

Strength
| 200 at the Palace Museum; 20,000–30,000 elsewhere in Henan and Shandong | Green Standard Army~17,500; Eight Banners: ~9,000: Beijing: ~1,000 |

Casualties and losses
| An estimated 22,000 dead and executed | 300~400Killed |

The Eight Trigrams uprising of 1813 (Chinese: 癸酉之變) broke out in China under the Qing dynasty. The rebellion was started by some elements of the millenarian Tianli Sect (天理教) or Heavenly Principle Sect, which was a branch of the White Lotus Sect. Led by Lin Qing (林清; 1770–1813) and Li Wencheng, the revolt occurred in the Zhili, Shandong, and Henan provinces of China.

In 1812, the leaders of the Eight Trigram Sect (Bagua jiao) also known as the Sect of Heavenly Order (Tianli jiao) announced that leader Li Wencheng was a 'true lord of the Ming' and declared 1813 as the year for rebellion, while Lin Qing declared himself the reincarnation of Maitreya, the prophesied future Buddha in Buddhism, using banners with the inscription "Entrusted by Heaven to Prepare the Way", a reference to the popular novel Water Margin. They considered him sent by the Eternal Unborn Mother of esoteric Chinese religions, to remove the Qing dynasty whom they regarded as having lost the Mandate of Heaven to rule.

The third leader was Feng Keshan, who was called the "King of Earth", Li titled the "King of Men", and Lin referred to as "King of Heaven".

The group won support from several powerful eunuchs in the Forbidden City. On 15 September 1813, the group attacked the imperial palace in Beijing. The rebels made it into the city.

The rebellion is seen as being similar to the previous White Lotus Rebellion, with the former being of religious intent and the latter leaders of the Eight Trigram appearing more interested in personal power by overthrowing the Qing dynasty.

== History ==
=== Leading up to Rebellion ===
The Eight Trigrams of the Book of Changes (I Ching)

Leader Lin Qing (林清; 1770–1813) was a hustler who drifted between odd jobs before taking over a local White Lotus sect. He met Li Wencheng in 1811, who at the time was acquiring control over a network of similar sects. Feng Keshan was a martial artist with strong ties to martial arts groups in the border region between Shandong, Henan and Zhili, and thus access to a large pool of recruits for rebellion, although he was significantly less interested in religious affairs. The name "Eight Trigrams" comes from the ancient Chinese divination text I Ching.

Lin Qing and Li Wencheng were partially inspired by the appearance in 1811 of a bright comet. Although the imperial government took this comet to predict glory for the dynasty, Lin and Li saw it as an "auspicious blessing for their enterprise". Dividing their followers into eight "trigrams", they told them that "when Li Wencheng has risen up, everyone who had given money or grain" to their enterprise "would be given land or official rank."

During July 1813, the main leaders of the Eight Trigrams met to set a date for the rebellion. They were prompted by droughts and floods, as well as by sharp increases in the price of wheat, and set 15 September as an appropriate time for the rebellion to begin. In addition to being right after the harvest, the Jiaqing Emperor was scheduled to be out of Beijing on a hunting trip, so the Forbidden City would be lightly guarded. The plan was that when Jiaqing returned to Beijing, they would attack him outside the city and assassinate him.

Li Wencheng was to rise in Huaxian and march northward to gather more followers and converge with Lin Qing in Beijing.

Beijing officials heard rumors of the planned rebellion and arrested Li Wencheng on 2 September. Officials tortured Li, but before they hurt him too seriously, Li's followers broke in and released him. This event pushed forward the date of the rebellion, and by 6 September, the members were busy collecting weapons. Followers of the Eight Trigrams quickly took control of the towns of Huaxian, Caoxian, and Dingtao in southern Zhili and Shandong provinces.

=== Assault of the Forbidden City ===
Lin Qing was in charge of the attack on the Forbidden City, although he personally did not participate in the attack. The rebels hid in shops outside the Eastern and Western palace gates. Lin enlisted several palace eunuchs to lead his approximately 250 followers through the gates. To distinguish themselves, the rebels tied white cloth around their heads and waists. Armed with knives and iron bars, they planned to enter the Forbidden City at noon, when the guards would be eating their meals. In addition, the Jiaqing Emperor was less than fifty miles from the city walls. This plan met with mixed success and about eighty rebels made it through the gates before they were closed. Fighting soon erupted as the Manchus realized that the rebels were inside the gates. It was at this time that Prince Mianning joined the battle and used his musket to wound one rebel and to kill another.

=== Aftermath ===
With the advantage of surprise lost, the rebels turned and fled. Under the leadership of the Three Princes Cheng, Mianzhi, Mianning, as well as officers of the Imperial Guards Brigade and loyal eunuchs, the surviving rebels were hunted down.

Several thousand supporters continued besieging several cities from their headquarters in Huaxian, Henan province for several months until suppressed by Qing forces on 1 January 1814.

Li Wencheng, along with 4000 supporters, withdrew to Huixian. He self-immolated and died while besieged by Qing troops. His wife Li Zhangshi kept Huaxian until the following year when she hanged herself as the city fell.

During the battle at the Forbidden City, a total of thirty-one rebels were killed and forty-four captured alive, but before it was over the rebels had either murdered or injured over a hundred people in the palace. By the time the government suppressed the revolt, more than 20,000 Eight Trigrams members had been killed. It is estimated that 70,000 were killed in total during the period of disorder.

The uprising caused the Qing to intensify persecution of all religions perceived as heterodox, including Christianity. This negatively impacted the budding Protestant mission in Guangdong.

== See also ==
- White Lotus Rebellion
- Miao Rebellion (1795–1806)
