= Chinese salvationist religions =

Chinese religious tradition concerned with personal and societal salvation

Chinese salvationist religions or Chinese folk religious sects are a Chinese religious tradition characterised by a concern for salvation (moral fulfillment) of the person and the society. They are distinguished by egalitarianism, a founding charismatic person often informed by a divine revelation, a specific theology written in holy texts, a millenarian eschatology and a voluntary path of salvation, an embodied experience of the numinous through healing and self-cultivation, and an expansive orientation through evangelism and philanthropy.

Some scholars consider these religions a single phenomenon, and others consider them the fourth great Chinese religious category alongside the well-established Confucianism, Buddhism and Taoism. Some of these religions focus on the worship of the universal God (Shangdi) and regard their holy patriarchs as embodiments of God.

== Terminology and definition ==
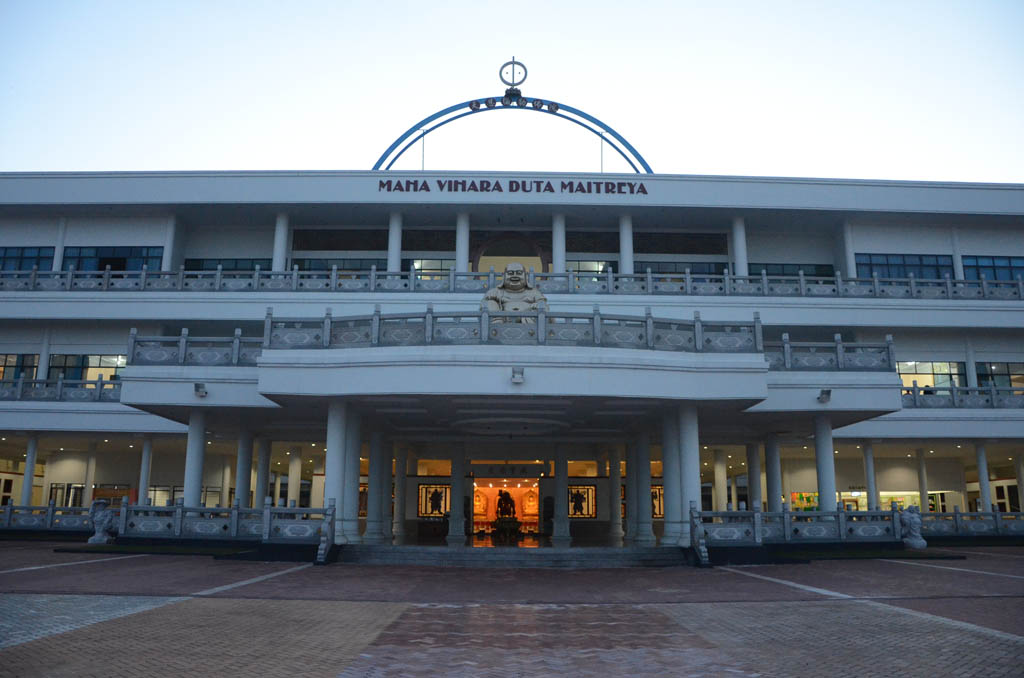
① A church of Yiguandao in Batam, Indonesia.

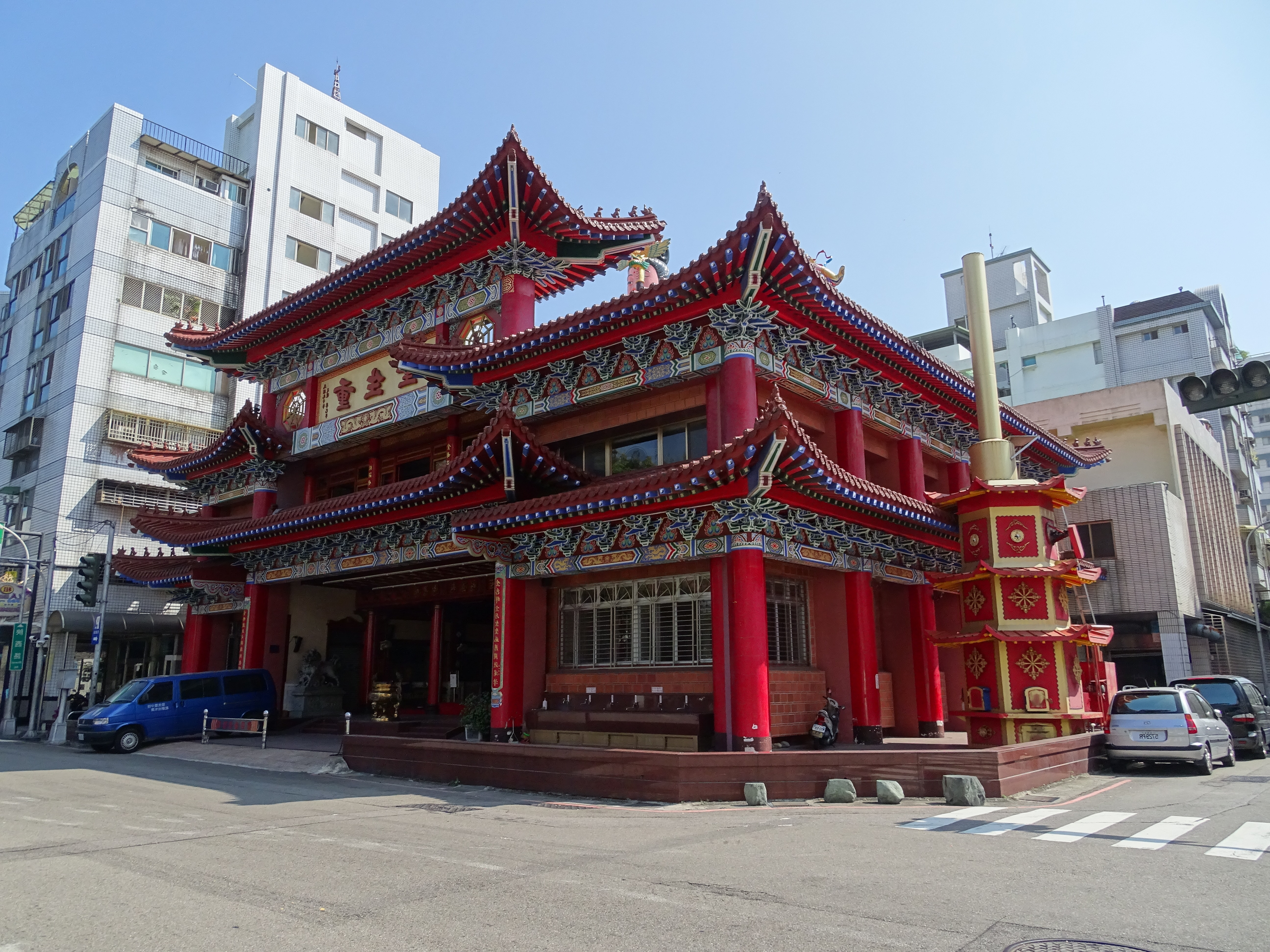
② The Luanist Rebirth Church (重生堂; Chóngshēngtáng) in Taichung, Taiwan.

Two influential and competing folk sectarian currents: ① Yiguandao focusing on personal salvation through inner work, considers itself the most valid "Way of Heaven" (天道; Tiāndào) and its own a "Way of Former Heaven" (先天道; Xiāntiāndào), that is a cosmological definition of the state of things prior to creation, in unity with God; it regards ② Luanism, a cluster of churches which focus on social morality through refined (儒; rú) Confucian ritual to worship the gods, as the "Way of Later Heaven" (后天道; Hòutiāndào), that is the cosmological state of created things.

"Chinese salvationist religions" (救度宗教; jiùdù zōngjiào) is a contemporary neologism coined as a sociological category and gives prominence to folk religious sects' central pursuit that is the salvation of the individual and the society, in other words the moral fulfillment of individuals in reconstructed communities of sense. Chinese scholars traditionally describe them as "folk religious sects" (民間宗教; mínjiān zōngjiào, 民間教門; mínjiān jiàomén or 民間教派; mínjiān jiàopài) or "folk beliefs" (民間信仰; mínjiān xìnyǎng).

They are distinct from the Chinese folk religion consisting in the worship of gods and ancestors, although in English language there is a terminological confusion between the two. The 20th-century expression for these salvationist religious movements has been "redemptive societies" (救世團體; jiùshì tuántǐ), coined by scholar Prasenjit Duara.

A collective name that has been in use possibly since the latter part of the Qing dynasty is huìdàomén (會道門; "churches, ways and gates"), as their names interchangeably use the terms huì (會; "church, society, association, congregation"), dào (道; "way"), or mén (門; "gate[way], door") when referring to their corporate form.

Their congregations and points of worship are usually called táng (堂; "church, hall") or tán (坛; "altar"). Western scholars often treat them as a "Protestant" stream in Chinese religion.

The Vietnamese religions of Minh Đạo and Caodaism emerged from the same tradition of Chinese folk religious movements.

=== Secret religions ===
A category overlapping with that of the salvationist movements is that of the "secret societies" (秘密社會; mìmì shèhuì, or 秘密結社; mìmì jiéshè), religious communities of initiatory and secretive character, including rural militias and fraternal organisations which became very popular in the early republican period, and often labeled as "heretical doctrines" (宗教异端; zōngjiào yìduān).

Recent scholarship has begun to use the label "secret sects" (秘密教門; mìmì jiàomén) to distinguish the peasant "secret societies" with a positive dimension of the Yuan, Ming and Qing periods, from the negatively viewed "secret societies" of the early republic that became instruments of "anti-revolutionary forces" (the Kuomintang or Japan).

=== New Religious Movements ===
Conceptual overlap exists with New religious movements. New religious movements have teachings and practices distinct from established religions and do not adhere to those religions' established authorities.

In the Chinese context, Falun Gong and Eastern Lightning are typical examples of new religious movements.

== Origin and history ==
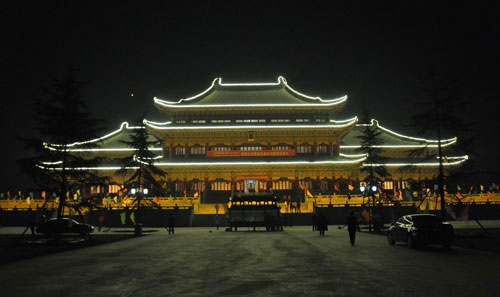
Temple of the Founding Father (师祖殿; Shīzǔdiàn) of the principal holy see (圣地; shèngdì) of the Plum Flower sect, related to Baguadao, in Xingtai, Hebei.

=== Imperial China ===
Many of these religions are traced to the White Lotus tradition ("Chinese Maternism", as mentioned by Philip Clart) that was already active in the Song dynasty; others claim a Taoist legacy and are based on the recovery of ancient scriptures attributed to important immortals such as Lü Dongbin and Zhang Sanfeng, and have contributed to the popularisation of neidan; other ones are distinctively Confucian and advocate the realisation of a "great commonwealth" (大同; dàtóng) on a world scale, as dreamt of in the Book of Rites. Some scholars even find influences from Manichaeism, Mohism and shamanic traditions.

Ming dynasty (and later, Qing dynasty) authorities collectively characterized the new religious societies as "White Lotus teachings", although actual beliefs and practices of the groups varied substantially. Practices so characterized in these periods included Pure Land Buddhism, Luo teaching, Yellow Heaven teaching, Great Yang teaching, the inner alchemy of the Eight Trigrams tradition, and the Three-in-One teachings.

In the 16th to 17th century many folk religious movements were outlawed by the imperial authorities as "evil religions" or "heterodox sects" (邪教; xiéjiào). Imperial authorities regarded their teachings as inherently heretical because in teaching that existing human affairs were corrupt, those teachings amounted to denial of Confucian values of political order and social harmony.

Small, local new religious movements tended to be tolerated by the state during the Ming and Qing periods, in part because of the state's limited capacity to exercise effective control at the local levels. The Qing elite condemned salvationist groups as improper cults or heretical sects, but attempts to suppress the groups were only sporadic. Opposition from the state contributed to new religious movements engaging in rebellions (such as the White Lotus and the Taiping Heavenly Kingdom) as did the sects' millenarian beliefs. Most of new religious movements did not actively seek to confront the state.

=== Republic of China ===
With the collapse of the Qing state in 1911 the sects enjoyed an unprecedented period of freedom and thrived, and many of them were officially recognised as religious groups by the early republican government. In the Beiyang period, political disunity and fragmentation resulted in the decline of old institutions. New religious movements found opportunities to register with the government as religious, philanthropic, or public interest associations. During this time, some new religious movements like Tongshanshe became modern organizations with national headquarters, local chapters, and the like.

By the Republic of China period, religious societies developed certain common aspects, though they continued to have major variation in ritual and belief. Common aspects included an emphasis on salvation, which distinguished the societies from traditional family temple based religious practice. Many societies expressed belief in a female deity, the Unborn Venerable Mother. The Unborn Venerable Mother was asserted to have given birth to a man and woman who in turn produced the human race; after being sent to live in the world, the human race fell into wrongdoing and confusion. The Unborn Venerable Mother had sent the Lamplighter Buddha, then the Sakyamuni Buddha, and was preparing to send the Maitreya Buddha, who would guide believers to a paradise on earth, the Homeland of True Emptiness.

The Republic of China viewed new religious movements less favorably over time. After the Northern Expedition, the Nationalist government banned several major new religious movements, deeming them superstitious and as presenting an infiltration risk. The popularity of new religious movements continued to grow during the Nationalist era despite the state's disfavor. Redemptive societies modeled their organizations on civic associations of the late Qing period, writing constitutions, bylaws, and publishing their precepts and doctrines. Their writings emphasized the moral and social value of the organization, including charitable projects. Sociologist Yanfei Sun attributes the success of new religious movements during this period their effective harnessing of nationalist sentiment, their ability to take advantage of diverse social networks, and their "eclectic blending of messages from various deep-seated religious traditions [which] resonated with the Chinese people."

The Nationalist government's efforts to constrain new religious movements was also limited in regions governed by local strongmen and in areas that Japanese forces occupied. Additionally, lobbying efforts on behalf of some new religious movements resulted in them being allowed to exist and develop in the form of charitable organizations.

In the 1920s and 1930s, economic insecurity contributed to the major growth of new religious movements. The largest groups in this period were Yiguandao, Society for the Common Good, Xiantiandao (the Way of Former Heaven), and Jiugongdao (the Nine Palaces Way).

In 1928, the ROC government banned the Daoyuan, the Wushanshe, and the Fellowship of Goodness.

From 1931 to 1945, Japan encouraged the growth of new religious movements in Manchuria and other occupied areas, believing that this would advance Japanese interests.

During the Second Sino-Japanese War, both the Nationalists and the Communists sought to mobilize new religious movements to help achieve wartime objectives.

Yiguandao became the largest new religious movement of the era, in part because of its effective use of opportunities during the war. Its founder Zhang Guangbi developed a close relationship with the Japanese and Yiguandao included officials of the Wang Jingwei government in its membership. As a result, both the Nationalists and the Communists condemned Yiguandao; at the end of the Second Sino-Japanese War, Zhang was arrested and the society was banned. As the Communists came into power, some networks of Yiguandao engaged in armed conflict with the Communists, interpreting the Communist victory in the civil war as showing that the "three disasters and eight difficulties" as the beginning of the third kalpa.

=== People's Republic of China ===
The founding of the People's Republic in 1949 saw increased suppression of new religious movements. The PRC began a campaign to suppress the new religious movements that had developed during the Republic of China era, deeming them reactionary secret societies (fandong huidaomen) that may have been infiltrated by Nationalist elements and which could engage in sabotage. These efforts eliminated new religious movements from public practice.

The impacts of the Cultural Revolution on new religious movements varied. Especially because of the attack on the Four Olds, some disbanded or became covert. Others were able to take advantage of the fact that the Public Security Bureau apparatus was in disarray.

From 1983 to 1986 (and later in some areas), the government implemented a "strike hard" campaign against these movements.

In the mid-1990s, the Chinese state began to adopt Western anti-cult discourse and terminology, influenced by the global media coverage of groups like the Branch Davidians, Aum Shinrikyo, and the Order of the Solar Temple. It stopped using the Mao-era term "reactionary secret society" to refer to such groups, and instead began using the term "evil cult" (邪教, xiejiao) or "cultic organization". From 1995 to 1999, the Ministry of State Security, the State Council, and the CPC Central Committee designated 14 new religious movements as evil cults.

Scholar Benjamin Penny noted that Li Hongzhi, Falun Gong's leader, presents himself as the sole transmitter of teachings that promises his adherents salvation. Penny explains that, in Li's usage, salvation refers to "escaping the cataclysms" that occurs at "the end of the kalpa" and "entering the next age". Li had taught that humanity is currently living in the "last days of Last Havoc" and that he chose this time to make Falun Gong's teachings public.

In 1999, the state engaged in an anti-Falun Gong campaign. As part of this effort, it created the Central Leading Group on Preventing and Dealing with Cults (the executive office of which is referred to as the 610 Office) and which in 2003 was expanded to cover other "cultic groups". On 30 October 1999, the National People's Congress passed the Resolution on Banning Cults, Preventing and Punishing Cultic Activities. The Supreme People's Court and the Supreme People's Procuratorate promulgated instructions on how to apply existing criminal law to people involved in "evil cults," which it defined as "illegal groups that are founded by using religion, qigong, or other pretenses; deify their leaders; produce and spread superstitious ideas and heretical teachings to deceive and swindle people' recruit and control their members; and pose a danger to society." With some revisions, these continue to be the basic legal framework for new religious movements which the state deems as cults, as of 2026.

Since the 1990s and 2000s the climate was relaxed and some of these sects have received some form of official recognition. In Taiwan all the still existing restrictions were rescinded in the 1980s.

Folk religious movements began to rapidly revive in mainland China in the 1980s, and now if conceptualised as a single group they are said to have the same number of followers of the five state-sanctioned religions of China taken together. Scholars and government officials have been discussing to systematise and unify this large base of religious organisations; in 2004 the State Administration of Religious Affairs created a department for the management of folk religions. In the late 2015 a step was made at least for those of them with a Confucian identity, with the foundation of the Holy Confucian Church of China which aims to unite in a single body all Confucian religious groups.

In 2014, proselytizing members of a new religious movement murdered a woman named Wu Shuoyan at a McDonald's restaurant in Zhaoyuan when she refused to provide them her phone number. Different views of the murderers' affiliations exist: they were either members of Eastern Lightning (itself an offshoot of The Shouters), or a further offshoot of Eastern Lightning. The murder prompted a wave of government campaigns to crack down on what the state deems as "evil cults".

Many of the movements of salvation of the 20th and 21st century aspire to become the repository of the entirety of the Chinese tradition in the face of Western modernism and materialism, advocating an "Eastern solution to the problems of the modern world", or even interacting with the modern discourse of an Asian-centered universal civilisation.

== Geography and diffusion ==
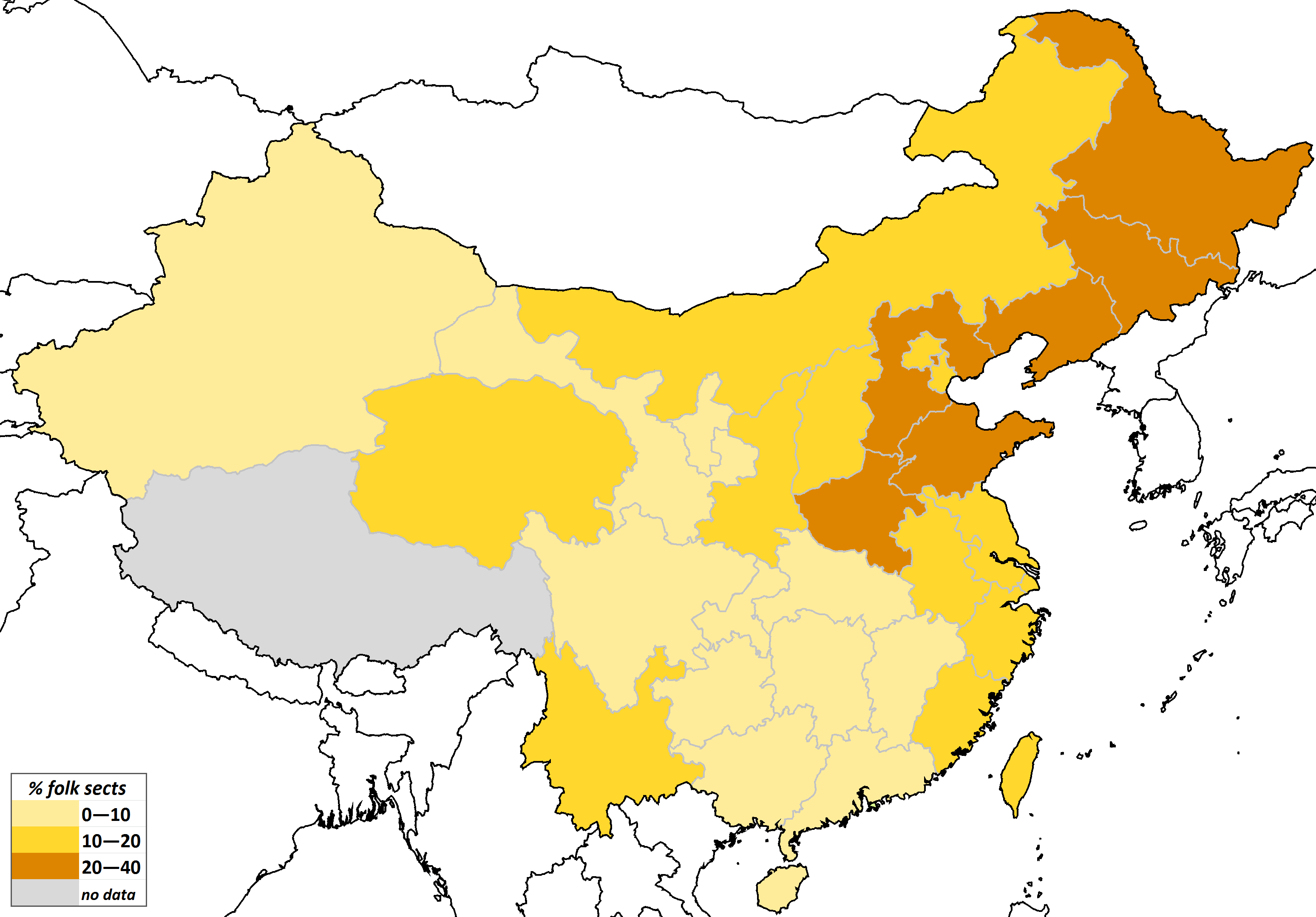
Geographic distribution of influence of China's popular religious sects.

The Chinese folk religious movements of salvation are mostly concentrated in northern and northeastern China, although with a significant influence reaching the Yangtze River Delta since the 16th century. The northern provinces have been a fertile ground for the movements of salvation for a number of reasons: firstly, popular religious movements were active in the region already in the Han dynasty, and they deeply penetrated local society; secondly, northern provinces are characterised by social mobility around the capital and weak traditional social structure, thus folk religious movements of salvation fulfill the demand of individual searching for new forms of community and social network.

According to the Chinese General Social Survey of 2012, approximately 2.2% of the population of China, which is around 30 million people, claim to be members of folk religious sects. The actual number of followers may be higher, about the same as the number of members of the five state-sanctioned religions of China if counted together. In Taiwan, recognised folk religious movements of salvation gather approximately 10% of the population as of the mid-2000s.

== Chronological record of major sects ==
=== 1277–1367 ===
- White Lotus (白蓮教; Báiliánjiào)
- Maitreya teachings (弥勒教; Mílèjiào)

=== 1367–1911 ===
- Baguadao (八卦道 "Way of the Eight Trigrams") networks
- Denghua (燈花教 "Flower of Light") sect
- Hongyang (弘阳 "Great Sun") or Hunyuan (混元 "Original Undetermined") sect
- Huangtiandao (黃天道 "Way of the Yellow Sky") or Xuangu (悬鼓 "Dark Drum") sect
- Luo teaching (罗教; Luójiào, "Luo (Menghong)'s tradition"): Patriarch Luo was reportedly polemical towards the Bailian, Maitreyan, and Huangtian sects
  - Dacheng (大乘教 "Great Vehicle") or Yuandun (圆顿教 "Sudden Stillness") sect, the eastern branch of Luoism
    - Sects requiring fasting (斋教; zhāijiāo), including Xiantiandao dubbed the Qinglian (青莲教 "Black [Blue, or Green] Lotus") sect during the Qing
      - Mohou Yizhu (末後一著教 "Final Salvation") sect founded by Wang Jueyi in the 1870s, renamed Yiguandao in 1905
  - Dacheng teaching of Mount Jizu (鸡足山大乘教; Jīzúshān dàchéngjiào), a western branch of Luoism founded by Zhang Baotai in Yunnan
- Church of the Highest Supreme (太上会; Tàishànghuì; also known as 太上门; Tàishàngmén, the "Gate of the Highest Supreme")
  - This sect has many schools, one of them is Xiao Yao Pai (逍遥派; Xiāoyáo Pài)
- Church of the Heaven and the Earth (天地会; Tiāndìhuì) or 天地門; Tiandimen "Gate of the Heaven and the Earth")
- Sanyi teaching (三一教 "Three-One"), founded by Lin Zhao'en on the base of Confucian principles

=== 1911–1949 ===
- Zaili teaching (在理教; Zàilǐjiào, "Abiding Principle")—registered in 1913
- Daode Xueshe (道德学社 "Community for the Study of the Way and its Virtue")—1916
- Xiantiandao (先天道 "Way of the Former Heaven") networks
  - Shengdao (圣道 "Holy Way"), best known by its incorporate name of Tongshanshe (同善社 "Community of the Goodness")—1917
  - Guiyidao (皈依道, "Way of the Return to the One"), best known by its corporate name of School of the Way of the Return to the One or simply School of the Way (道院; Dàoyuàn)—1921–27
  - Yiguandao (一貫道 "Consistent Way")—registered in 1947
    - Haizidao (亥子道 "Way of the Children")—branched out in the 1980s
    - Miledadao (弥勒大道 "Great Way of Maitreya")—branched out in the 1980s
  - Dragon Flower Church of the Heart-bound Heavenly Way (一心天道龙华会; Yīxīn Tiāndào Lónghuá Huì)—1932
  - Yuanmingdao (圆明道 "Way of the Bright Circle")
  - Yaochidao (瑤池道 "Way of the Jasper Lake")
  - Guigendao (归根道 "Way of the Return to the Root")
- Jiushi (救世教 "Life Healing") sect, also known by its corporate name Wushanshe (悟善社; "Community of the Awakening to the Goodness")—1919
- Universal Church of the Way and its Virtue (万国道德会; Wànguó Dàodéhuì)—1921
- Jiugongdao (九宫道, "Way of the Nine Palaces")—1926
- Holy Church of the Heavenly Virtue (天德圣教; Tiāndé shèngjiào)—early form of Tiandiism, recognised in 1930
- Church of Virtue (德教会; Déjiàohuì)—started in 1945
- Zhenkongdao (真空道 "Way of the True Emptiness")—1948
- Confucian Church (孔教会; Kǒngjiàohuì)—founded by Kang Youwei
- Xixinshe (洗心社 "Community of the Pure Heart")—another organisation of Kang Youwei's idea of a Confucian church
- Yellow Sand Society—rural secret society and millenarian sect

=== Late 20th century ===
- Xuanyuandao (轩辕道 "Way of the Mysterious Origin")—founded in 1952
- Confucian Way of the Gods (儒宗神教; Rúzōng Shénjiào)—started in 1853, formally established in 1979
- Lord of Universe Church (天帝教; Tiāndìjiào)—branch of Tiandiism established in 1979
- Qigong (气功 "Cultivation of the Spirit")
  - Falun Gong (法轮功 "Cultivation of the Wheel of Law")
- Zishen Nation (子申国) — led by the self-proclaimed emperor Li Guangchang, the sect ruled a small area in Zhejiang from 1981 to 1986
- Weixinism (唯心教; Wéixīnjiào, "Only Heart") or "Holy Church of the Heart-Only" (唯心聖教; Wéixīn Shèngjiào)
- Church of Almighty God (also known as Eastern Lightning) — founded in 1991, the movement teaches that Jesus only partially completed the work of salvation and has come back to earth as a Chinese woman to complete his unfinished work.

=== 21st century ===
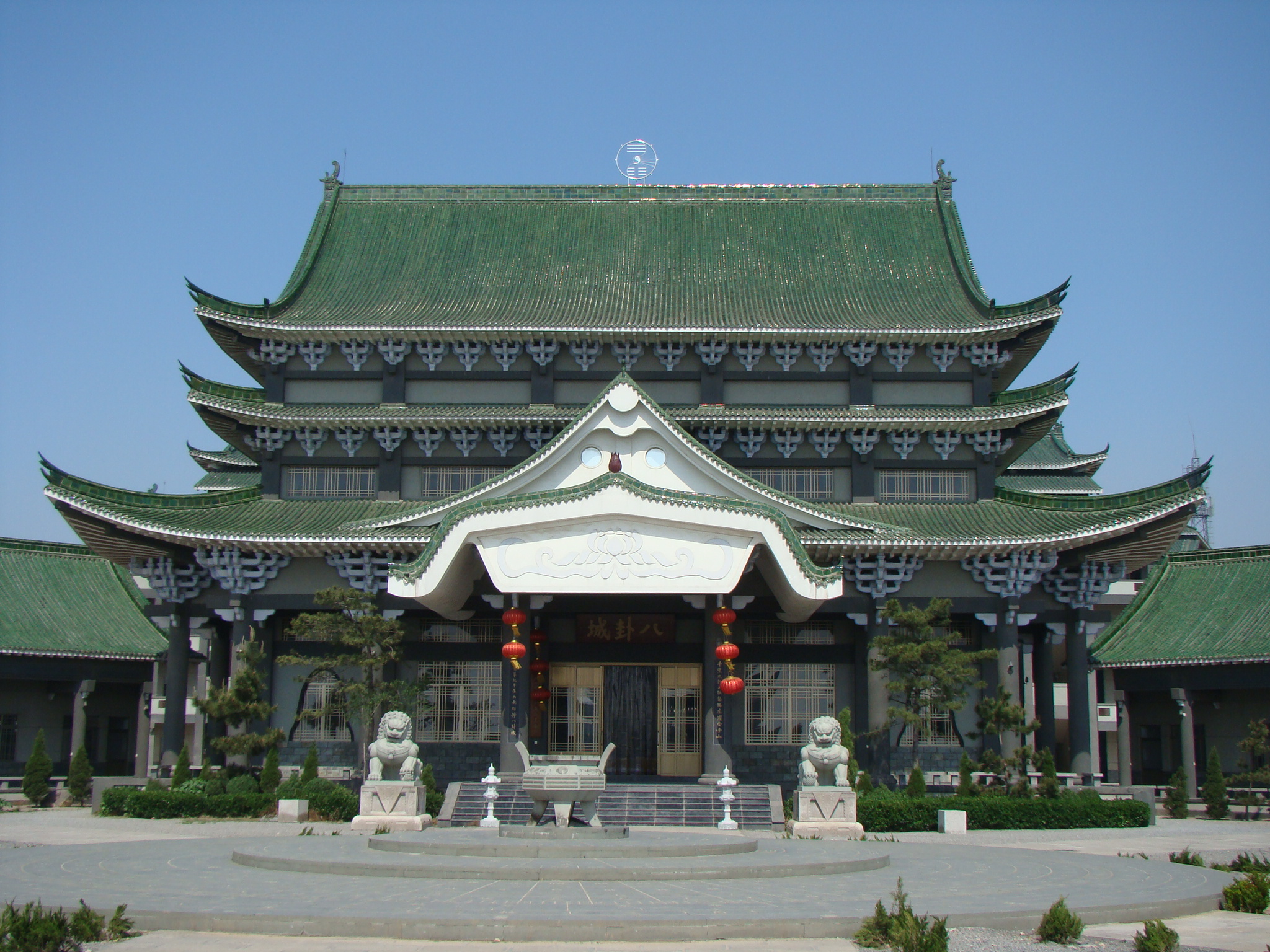
The City of the Eight Symbols in Qi, Hebi, is the headquarters of the Weixinist Church in Henan.

- Confucian religious groups in China mainland (Confucian churches)

== Other sects ==
- Changshandao
- Church of Maitreya the King of the Universe (宇宙弥勒皇教; Yǔzhòu mílè huáng jiào)
- Dadao Hui (大刀会 "Church of the Big Sword")
- Dashengdao (大圣道; "Way of the Great Sage")
- Datong Hui (大同会 "Church of the Great Harmony")
- Dayiism (大易教; Dàyì jiào, "Great Simplicity")
- Dongyue Hui
- Gengshen Hui
- Guixiangdao (跪香道 "Way of the Kneeling to Incense")
- Holy Church of China (中华圣教; Zhōnghuá shèngjiào)
- Hongsanism (红三教; Hóngsān jiào, "Red Three")
- Hongyangjiao (紅陽教, "Red sun sect")
- Huangjidao (皇极道 "Way of the Imperial Pole")
- Huangxiandao (黄仙道 "Way of the Yellow Immortal")
- Huazhaidao (华斋道 "Way of Flowers and Fasting")
- Jiugendao (旧根道 "Way of the Old Source")
- Laojundao (老君道 "Way of the Venerable Master")
- Laorendao (老人道 "Way of the Venerable Men")
- Mount Li Maternism (骊山老母教; Líshān Lǎomǔ jiào)
- Puhuamen (普化门 "Gate of the Universal Change")
- Pujidao (普济道 "Way of the Universal Help")
- Puduism (普度教; Pǔdù jiào, "Universal Judgement"), Pududao (普度道 "Way of the Universal Judgment")
- Qixingism
- Qiugongdao
- Renxuehaodao (人学好道 "Way of Men Learning the Goodness")
- Sanfengdao (三峰道 "Way of the Three Peaks")
- Shengxiandao (圣仙道 "Way of the Sages and the Immortals")
- Shenmendao (神门道 "Way of the Godly Gate")
- Sifangdao (四方道 "Way of the Four Manifestations")
- Suibiandao
- Tianguangdao (天光道 "Way of the Heavenly Light")
- Tianhuadao (天花道 "Way of the Heavenly Flower")
- Tianmingdao (天明道 "Way of the Heavenly Bright")
- Tianxianmiaodao (天仙庙道 "Way of the Temple of the Heavenly Immortals")
- Wanquandao (万全道 "Way of the Endless Whole" or "Surefire Way")
- Wugong Hui
- Xiaodao Hui (小刀会 "Church of the Small Sword")
- Xuanmen Zhenzong (玄门真宗, "True School of the Mysterious Gate")
- Yinjiezhi Hui
- Yuanshuai Hui
- Yuxumen (玉虚门 "Gate of the Jade Vacuity")
- Zhongfangdao (中方道 "Way of the Middle Abode")
- Zhongjiao Daoyi Hui
- Zhongyongdao (中庸道 "Way of the Golden Mean")
- Zhongxiao Tianfu (忠孝天府 "Heavenly House of Filial Loyalty")
- Zhutian Hui
- Zishenguo ("Zishen nation")

== See also ==
- Ancestor veneration in China
- Chinese Buddhism
- Chinese folk religion in Southeast Asia
- Japanese new religions, some of which are related to Chinese sects
- Northeast China folk religion
- Daoist schools

In Philippines

- Bell Church

In Japan

- Japanese new religions

In Korea

- Cheondoism
