= Tiandi teachings =

Group of Chinese salvationist sects

Tiandiism Heavenly Deity religions 天帝教 Tiāndìjiào
- Both churches use, as their symbol, variations of the ancient Tian 天 character to resemble a human figure and a flame.
- Type: Chinese salvationist religion
- Distinct fellowships: ① Holy Church of the Heavenly Virtue (天德聖教) ② Lord of Universe Church (天帝教)
- Founder: Xiao Changming (1900s); Li Yujie (1978)
- Origin: 20th century Anhui, Taiwan
- Members: 2005, combined membership in Taiwan: 500.000 (2.2%)

Tiandiism (Note: Religion of the "Heavenly Deity" or "Universal Lord" (Tiāndì 天帝)) is a group of Chinese salvationist sects, namely the Holy Church of the Heavenly Virtue (Note: 天德聖教 Tiāndé shèngjiào) and the Lord of Universe Church, (Note: 天帝教 Tiāndì jiāo) which emerged respectively from the teachings of Xiao Changming and Li Yujie, disseminated in the early 20th century. The Lord of Universe Church is actually a later development of the former, established in the 1980s.

These religions focus on the worship of the "Heavenly Deity" or "Heavenly Emperor" (Tiāndì 天帝), on health through the proper cultivation of qi, and teach a style of qigong named Tianren qigong. According to scholars, the doctrines of Li Yujie are traceable to the Taoist tradition of Huashan, where he studied for eight years. The Lord of Universe Church is active both in Taiwan and mainland China, where it has high-level links.

== Tiandiist bodies ==
=== Holy Church of the Heavenly Virtue ===
The origins of the Holy Church of the Heavenly Virtue (天德聖教 Tiāndé shèngjiào) go back to Sichuan in 1899, with the alleged resurrection of a young boy named Xiao Changming (蕭昌明, 1896–1943) who had apparently died three days earlier. After his revival, he declared that he had received Heaven's mandate (tianming) to save humanity from suffering. He embarked on a successful religious career and attracted a large following.

In 1937 he established his headquarters on Mount Huang in southern Anhui province where he died in 1943. Like other sects, Xiao Changming's movement was suppressed in China after 1949, but survives in Taiwan and Hong Kong. In Taiwan, one of Xiao's disciples, Li Yujie, eventually decided to walk his own path and founded a new group called the Lord of Universe Church in 1978, which diverges doctrinally in several aspects from the mother group, yet also sees itself in the tradition of Xiao Changming's teachings.

Currently, there exist two regional organizations for this religion. Its Hong Kong headquarters is located at Castle Peak in the New Territories. In Taiwan the religion's situation is characterized by disunity, with several separate organizations claiming to continue original Xiao's teachings.

=== Lord of Universe Church ===
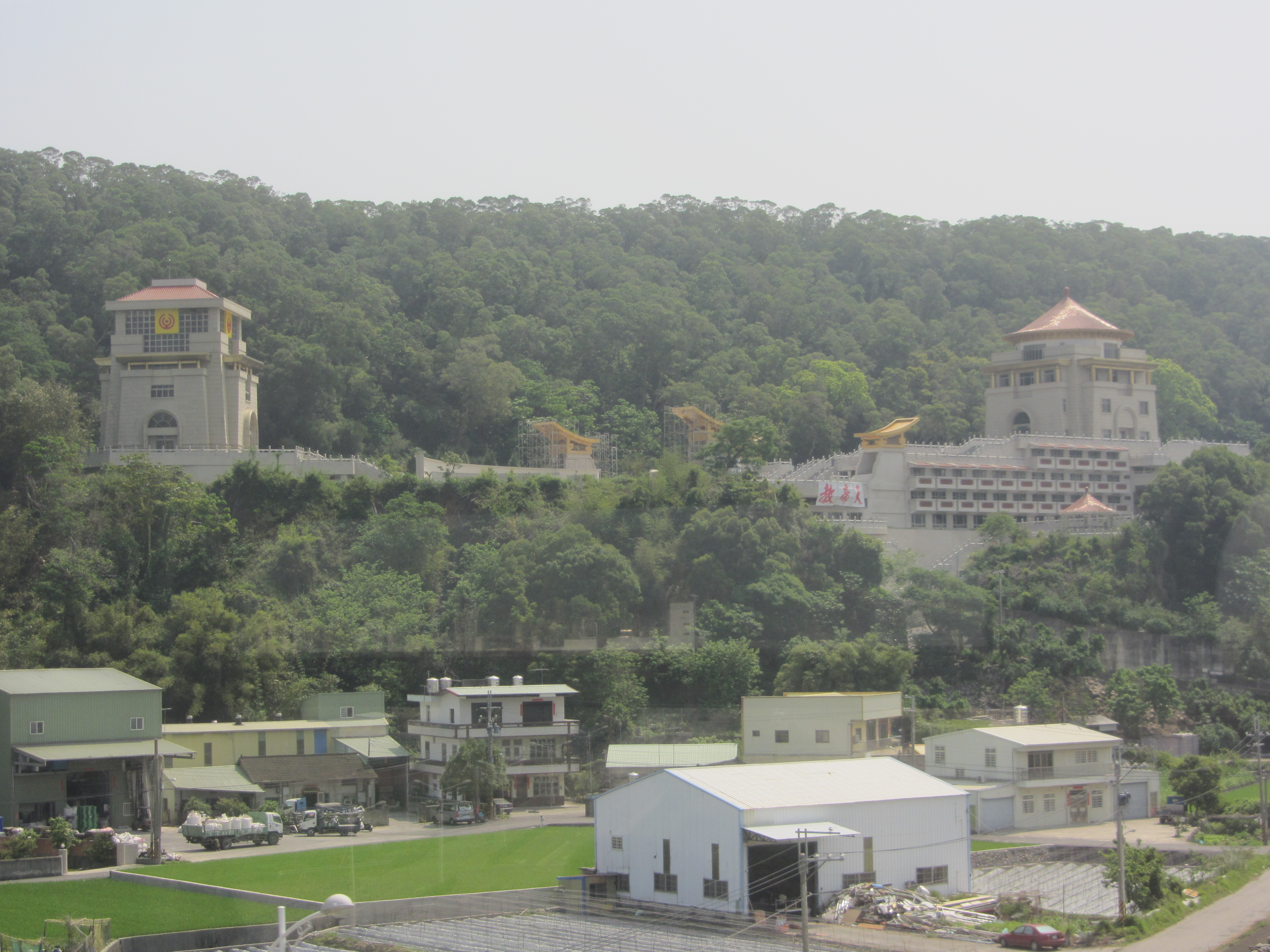
Tiandi church under construction in Miaoli County, Taiwan.

The Lord of Universe Church (天帝教 Tiāndì jiāo) is based in Taiwan and is devoted to the Tiandiist beliefs as proclaimed by Li Yujie. It is an offshoot of the Holy Church of the Heavenly Virtue and it emphasizes chanting, traditional medicine, and a form of meditation which it calls "quiet sitting" in English.

Li Yujie (1901–1994) was born in Suzhou. He worked in the Kuomintang but left in 1958 to ensure political independence for his fledgling newspaper. In 1980 he claimed he was given permission by God to retransmit the message of the Heavenly Deity, which emphasize nuclear disarmament and Chinese unification. His book, The Ultimate Realm, was translated into Japanese and English under his guidance.

== See also ==
- Tian
- Xiantiandao
- Chinese folk religion
- Taoism
- Confucianism

== Bibliography ==
- "An introduction to the Lord of Universe Church". eRenlai.
- Palmer, D. A. (2011). "Chinese Redemptive Societies and Salvationist Religion: Historical Phenomenon or Sociological Category?" (PDF). Journal of Chinese Ritual, Theatre and Folklore. 172: 21–72.
- Vermander, Benoit (1999). "Christianity and the Taiwanese Religious Landscape" (PDF). The Way. 39. London Society of Jesus: 129–139.
- Micollier, Evelyne (1998). "Realignments in Religion and Health Practices: An Approach to the "New Religions" in Taiwanese Society". China Perspectives. 16: 34–40.
- Ju, Keyi; Lu, Xianlong (2014). "Tiandi jiao: The Daoist Connection". Journal of Daoist Studies. 7.
- Ownby, David (2020). "Text and Context: A Tale of Two Masters". In Clart, Philip; Ownby, David; Wang, Chien-chuan (eds.). Text and Context in the Modern History of Chinese Religions: Redemptive Societies and Their Sacred Texts. Leiden: Brill. pp. 173–216.
