= Tianxian miaodao =

Chinese salvationist religious sect

The Tianxian miaodao (天仙庙道 "Way of the Temple of the Heavenly Immortals"), incorporated as the Church of the Way of the Temple of the Heavenly Immortals (天仙庙道会 Tiānxiān miàodào huì), is a Chinese salvationist religious sect centered in Henan. It was founded in the mid-19th century and flourished in the early republic, and was known for its rebellious aptitude towards the state. Despite systematic efforts of the later communist republic to suppress it in the 1950s and 1960s, it has persisted to the present day.

== See also ==
- Chinese salvationist religions
- Chinese folk religion

== Sources ==
- Ownby, David (1996). "Scriptures of the Way of the Temple of the Heavenly Immortals". Chinese Studies in History. 29 (3): 5–14. doi:10.2753/CSH0009-463329035.
