= Li Guangchang =

Chinese self-declared emperor and salvationist sect leader

- Born: Changxiang Village, Cangnan County, China
- Other name: Zheng Min
- Occupation: Emperor of the Zishen Nation
- Years active: 1981–1986
- Known for: Leading a sect and de facto independent statelet in Cangnan County

Li Guangchang (Chinese: 李光長; pinyin: Lǐ Guāngchǎng, fl. 1980s), also known as Zheng Min (Chinese: 鄭民; pinyin: Zhèng Mín), was a self-declared Chinese emperor and leader of a salvationist sect. He ruled a small territory in Cangnan County, called the "Zishen Nation" (子申国), from 1981 to 1986 in de facto independence from China. His reign was eventually brought to an end by Chinese security forces who captured him and dismantled his statelet as well as his sect. Li was tried in court, and probably sentenced to death for leading a counter-revolutionary movement.

== Biography ==
Li was native to Changxiang Village, Cangnan County, and born into a poor family. He received a primary school education via the anti-illiteracy classes implemented by the Communist government after the Chinese Civil War's end in 1949. From an early age, he dreamed of becoming emperor. Skilled as an orator, he rose to leader of his village's farm production team. At some point, he was arrested for alleged crimes in corruption, and sentenced to five years in prison. He attempted unsuccessfully to break out from prison, resulting in an extension of his sentence by another five years. After ten years in prison, Li was released. His desire to oppose the government and to become emperor remained strong. He became a wandering preacher and a “swindler”, repeatedly clashing with the law.

By 1981, he was already rather old. In that year, he travelled under the name "Zheng Min" (鄭民) to Shuitou, Pingyang County, Zhejiang, claiming that he intended to reconnect with his old friend Wei Zhijian (魏志健). The latter had become locally notorious for illegal behavior of various kinds as well as his ambition to become an official one day. The two met and discussed various issues for several days until Li eventually convinced Wei to help organizing a sect termed the "Zishen Nation". According to a later official report by Chinese authorities, Li convinced Wei that he had been appointed emperor by two individuals, "Zhu Gang" (朱綱) from the United States and "Wulinbietuo" (烏林別托) from the Soviet Union. These two had allegedly founded the "Zishen Nation" in secret in accordance with the dying wishes of Sun Yat-sen, China's provisional first president, and had built an underground nuclear weapons factory in Tongling. As per these claims, Li believed that a nuclear war would soon break out, resulting in the collapse of China's Communist government and the takeover by his own empire. Li appointed Wei "General of the Third Army Corps" of Zishen, and urged him to gather local anti-communists for their cause. Li's project was not uncommon by itself, as hundreds of people have proclaimed themselves emperors or empresses in China since 1949; however, most of these pretenders gathered only very small groups of followers and were quickly arrested by government forces. In contrast, Li's group would prove surprisingly successful.

Li and Wei moved to Changxiang Village, proclaiming the establishment of Zishen and convincing the locals of their cause. They set up an actual government including various officials, created a state flag featuring a double planet in black, white, yellow, blue, vermillion; a war flag; and a uniform for their army. The center of the statelet was a Buddhist temple. From 1981, Li ruled his miniature empire in de facto independence, while his sect spread among the rural population of Zhejiang and Fujian. He promised wealth and government positions to those willing to follow him, appointing ministers, generals, and magistrates. To raise funds to support his government, Li encouraged donations and issued his own currency. According to researchers Yu Chen and Shenghua Zhang, Wei went to Fujian where he attempted to forge connections to the anti-Communist government on Taiwan, although without success. Instead, Wei encountered a man named Xu in Mingxi who claimed to possess an "imperial jade seal"; he and Li procured the alleged heirloom, cementing the latter's authority as self-proclaimed emperor.

In August 1984, Wei recruited Lin Bingqi, an ex-militiaman, for Zishen; as he had military experience, Li appointed Lin as general. Lin proved to have a talent in leading people, and managed to recruit several more people for his emperor's cause in Qingliu County. In early 1985, Li and Wei travelled to Shanxi, where the former gained the contract-rights for a coal mine, intending to turn it into a "major enterprise" as well as provisional headquarters for the movement. By 1986, his forces had become active in many counties, including Jiangle, Mingxi, Ninghua, Songxi, and Jianning. Many villagers believed in Li's rhetoric and prepared for dynastic change; others were terrorized by Li's followers. Researcher S.A. Smith described Li as "monarch of impressive longevity", finding it interesting that no public security bureau (PSB) crushed his statelet for five years despite Zishen's leadership making no secret of its aims. Li and his ministers spread several claims, arguing that they already controlled large parts of China, had access to nuclear weapons, foretold the arrival of heavenly soldiers, and promised their followers safety when the awaited nuclear apocalypse came to be.

The PSB later claimed that the sect had intended to launch an armed uprising in Ninghua on Chinese New Year of 1986, allegedly producing a potion to render people unconscious for this purpose. The uprising was reportedly inspired by the diviner Zhang Ruifang who had promised Li that he would be invincible in battle on a very specific date. The police raided Zishen's headquarters before the planned rebellion took place, and arrested 33 leaders of Zishen in spring 1986. Li initially escaped, but was arrested two months later in Shandong. He was subsequently charged with founding and leading a "reactionary secret sect for counterrevolutionary purposes". The sentences of Li and his companions remain unclear, but researchers Robin Munro and Mickey Spiegel considered it likely that the self-proclaimed emperor was sentenced to death.
