= Luo Menghong =

Religious figure; founder of Luoism (1443–1527)

- 罗梦鸿

Personal life
- Born: 1443
- Died: 1527 (aged 85)
- Known for: Founder of Luoism
- Other names: Luo Qing; Luo Jing; Luo Yin

Religious life
- Religion: Luoism

Senior posting
- Reincarnation: Lao Gu Fo

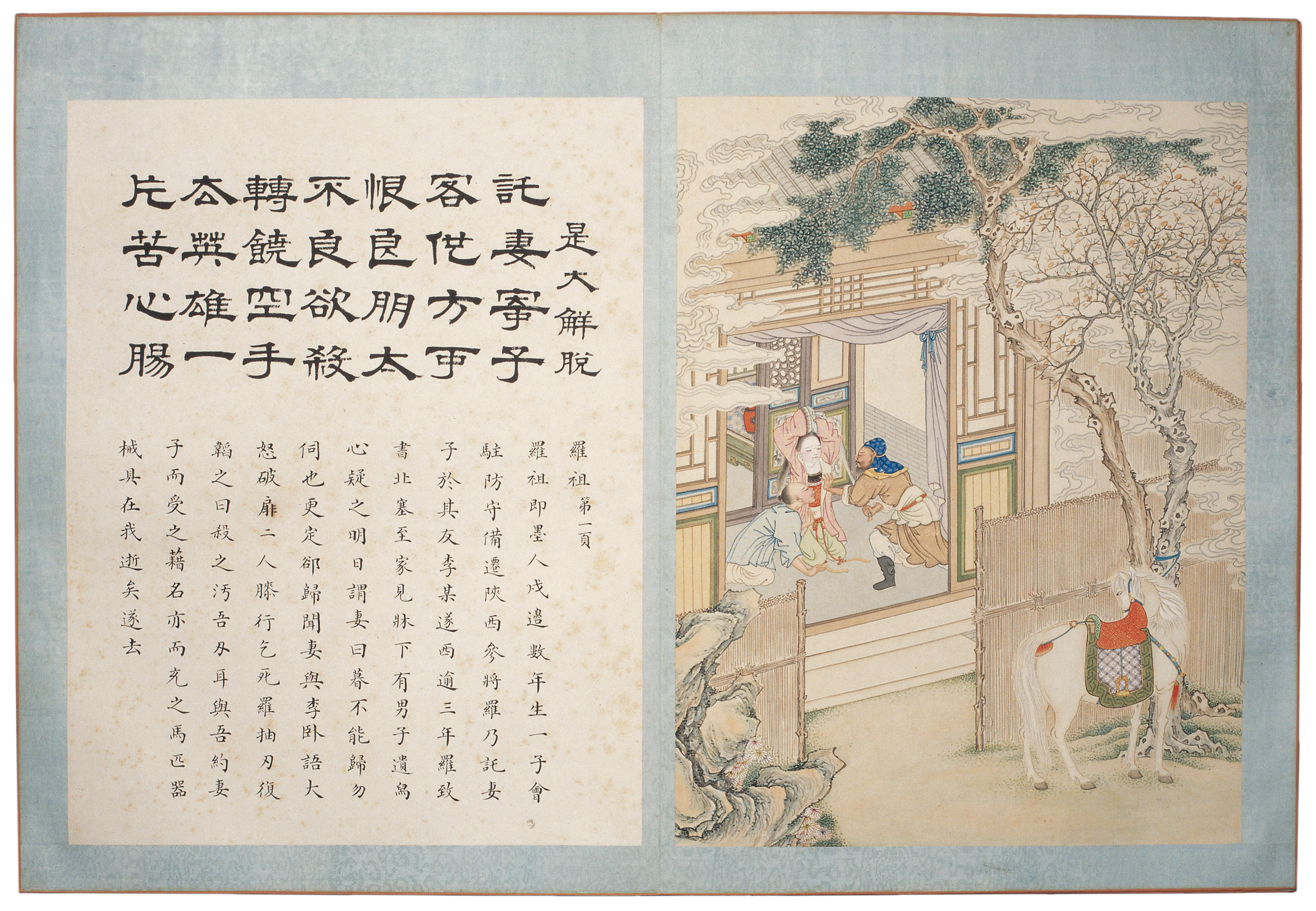

Luo Menghong (Chinese: 羅夢鴻 / 羅孟鴻; pinyin: Luómènghóng; 1443–1527), also written as “羅孟洪”, “羅孟鴻” or “羅梦宏”. He was also known as Patriarch Luo (羅祖) and his religious title was Luo Qing (羅清) or Non-Action Hermit (無為居士). Luo was the most important and most frequently venerated as founding patriarch figure by religious groups in the Ming and Qing dynasties. His teachings and scriptures became the model for countless new religious groups. No other popular sectarian religious teacher can compare to Patriarch Luo in stimulating the belief and knowledge of the common and educated peoples. Patriarch Luo is believed by his followers to be the direct successor of the 6th patriarch, Huineng and is an incarnation of the Venerable Ancient Buddha (老古佛) or Wuji Shengzu (無極聖祖).

A wide range of religious organizations of traditional Chinese religion either led by his descendants, disciples or totally independent groups whose teachings are derived from the teachings and scriptures of the Luo patriarch are known as Luoism/Luojiao (羅教).

== Early life ==
Luo Menghong was born in 1443 in Zhumao Township in Jimo County, Laizhou, Shandong. He was born into a hereditary soldier's family, and lost his mother when he was 3 years old and lost his father when he was 5 years old. After growing up in his uncle's family, he joined the army at Miyun Guard Post in Zhili, about 70 km northeast of Peking. After he joined the army in Zhili, Patriarch Luo served at Miyun, Gubeikou, Simatai, Wulingshan, and Jiangmaoyu Guard Posts. In the period between the Jingtai and Jiajing years, the Mongols frequently invaded the Ming borders. Therefore, Ming troops gathered in the area of Miyun Guard Post, making Miyun an important guard point.

== Religious career ==
At the age of 28, Luo began his spiritual journey to find a way to escape the cyclical path of samsara by studying Taoism. He learn from many spiritual masters and studied Buddhism at the Zen Buddhism school in Linji Zong. According to records written in Wubuliuce, patriarch Luo mentioned that he took Bodhisattva vows and lived the life of a monk in his home. The first book of the Wubuliuce (Five Books in Six Volumes), the Bitter Practice Scroll (苦功悟道卷) describes patriarch Luo's journey to enlightenment. At first patriarch Luo followed a teacher who told him to recite Amitabha's name. After eight years, he was frustrated by not being able to understand how he could ascend to the Pure Land, so he left his teacher in search of answers. Subsequently, he studied the Diamond Sutra (金刚經) for three years and also meditated but still felt dissatisfied with what he achieved. He continued to search for a way to avoid the path of rebirth and after thirteen years of trying everything, he finally realized that he was not satisfied. After thirteen years of trying everything, he finally realized that everything was empty and claimed to have achieved enlightenment by seeing the light from the Southwest.

Luo Menghong started to propagate his teachings in 1482. What happened next was that he had many disciples and became famous in Shandong and in the capital area. In the Zhengde emperor's reign years, the Luo patriarch established a hall for preaching in the Simatai area and the people who attended his preaching were mostly soldiers. He later called himself Luo Way (羅道) and moved his family to Shixia (石匣). Luo Menghong and his teachings exerted great influence on the troops and the local population. The teachings of Luo Qing became known as Luoism/Luojiao (羅教).

Patriarch Luo's popularity aroused the suspicion of the government, and he was eventually thrown into prison in Peking. Patriarch Luo spent 13 years in prison during which time he wrote Wubuliuce. His group of followers created a hagiographic narrative of Patriarch Luo's life in “The Initial transfer in Shandong” (山東初度) of the Overall Record of the Circumstances under Which the Three Patriarchs On High Traveled around and Taught (太上三祖行教因由總錄), portraying him as an outstanding teacher and hero of the Chinese empire who was able to resist the barbarians invading from outside during the period. Thanks to the help of court eunuchs who were among his followers, he was finally released from prison in 1482. In 1509, the Five Books in Six Volumes written by patriarch Luo were first printed, indicating that he was supported by influential people.

== Death ==
Luo died in 1527 and was buried in Wuwei Pagoda, Shixiaying, Tanzhou, Beijing. Near his grave a dome and an inscription were built in his honor. His grave became an object of worship by his followers until it was destroyed by order of the Qing empire in the early 18th century. Luo's death led to the fragmentation and diversification of his teachings. His teachings influenced almost all regions of China and many of the new and old religious sects and groups began to adopt his teachings.

== Sources ==
- Ma, Xisha; Huiying Meng (2011), Popular Religion and Shamanism, Brill, ISBN 978-9004174559
- Seiwert, Hubert Michael (2003), Popular Religious Movements and Heterodox Sects in Chinese History, Brill, ISBN 9004131469
- ter Haar, Barend (2015), Practicing Scripture: A Lay Buddhist Movement in Late Imperial China, Brill, ISBN 9780824853389
