= Sanyi teaching =

Chinese folk religious tradition of Fujian

Church of the Three-in-One 三一教协会 Sānyī jiào xiéhuì
- Type: Chinese folk religious sect
- Founder: Lin Zhao'en
- Origin: 16th century Putian, Fujian
- Other name(s): Sanyiism (三一教), Xiaism (夏教)
- Official website: http://www.31jiao.com/

The Harmonious Church of the Three-in-One (Chinese: 三一教协会; pinyin: Sānyī jiào xiéhuì (Note: translated as "Harmonious Church of the Three-in-One", "Harmonious Church of the Three-One" and "Harmonious Church of the Trinity".)), or Sanyiism (Chinese: 三一教; pinyin: Sānyī jiào) and Xiaism (Chinese: 夏教; pinyin: Xià jiào (Note: literally the "Summertime Transmission")), is a Chinese folk religious sect of Confucian character founded in the 16th century by Lin Zhao'en, in Putian. In 2011, it was officially recognised by the government of Fujian.

The religion is based on Confucian moral ideas and ancestral worship, and includes meditation techniques modeled after neidan (Chinese: 內丹术; pinyin: nèidān shù) and pursuit of enlightenment. Differently from other Chinese folk religious sects, the Sanyi philosophy is not expounded in the sentimental vernacular language but in the elaborate language of the Confucian literary tradition. The "Three in One" is a philosophical concept expressing the original trinity proceeding from the Tao, the two principles, yin and yang, of the Great Pole. The Great Pole is the One that contains yin and yang, the Two, in the Three.

== History ==
Sanyiism was founded by Lin Zhao'en (1517–98), in Putian, Fujian. Lin was born in an upper-class family, and among his ancestors and relatives were many officials and scholars. He started the usual career for the son of an influential family and passed the first civil examinations in 1534, but after failing the higher exams he forsook the career of an official to become a master of religion and philosophy according to the Confucian tradition. Given this background, Lin Zhao'en doctrines show little influence from the vernacular folk religious tradition of the baojuan literature.

Lin Zhao'en was instructed by other religious leaders, including a Confucian who taught him the true meaning of the Confucian classics and Taoists from whom he learnt neidan techniques.

In 1585 the regional official Yang Sizhi wrote a proclamation of heterodoxy against Lin, upset by his claim to be the true interpreter of the Confucian tradition, rejecting Zhu Xi, and to continue the teachings of the sages of antiquity. Despite the accusation of heterodoxy, the strength of the sect remained unshaken.

In Sanyi holy scriptures Lin Zhao'en is portrayed as a supernatural savior of cosmic significance. After Lin died, he was deified as the "Lord of the Three-in-One", and is worshipped in over a thousand temples in Fujian, and also in Taiwan and Southeast Asia's Chinese communities.

The religious community split into a number of schools and spread beyond the borders of Fujian up to Anhui, and then reaching Beijing. The community in Nanjing developed as an influential centre of gravitation for the religion. In Fujian, the religion developed into two major competing branches led by two direct disciples of Master Lin, namely Lu Wenhui and Lin Zhenming (alias Lin Zhijing). Through the Qing dynasty the religion survived strong in Fujian but declined elsewhere, and at the end of the 19th century it started to strongly revive.

As of 1998 the Church of the Three-in-One had approximately 500,000 adherents in Putian, which is 17% of the total population. In 2011 it was officially recognised as a legal religion by the government of Fujian.

== Rituals ==
Three-in-One practices include the "heart method" of self-cultivation, which is still widely practised in Putian today. The religion has its independent ritual tradition, similar to those of Taoism and Buddhism. Its ritual specialists perform communal offerings (jiao 醮) and merit-making funeral services (gongde 功德), along with individual rites.

In some communities in the Putian region, the Sanyi temple has become the primary village temple, the centre of collective life. Annual pilgrimages are made to the religion's central temple in Putian, Fujian.

== See also ==
- Chinese folk religion
- Chinese salvationist religions
- Confucianism
- Three Teachings

== Bibliography ==
- Kenneth Dean. Lord of the Three in One: The Spread of a Cult in Southeast China. Princeton University Press, 1998. ISBN 0691028818
- Edward L. Davis. Encyclopedia of Contemporary Chinese Culture. Routledge, 2005. ISBN 0415241294
- Hubert Michael Seiwert. Popular Religious Movements and Heterodox Sects in Chinese History. Brill, 2003. ISBN 9004131469
