= Buddhism in Taiwan (book) =

1999 non-fiction book by Charles Brewer Jones

Buddhism in Taiwan: Religion and the State, 1660 - 1990
- Author: Charles Brewer Jones
- Publisher: University of Hawaiʻi Press
- Publication date: 1999
- ISBN: 978-0-8248-6170-4
- OCLC: 40061228

Buddhism in Taiwan: Religion and the State, 1660-1990 is a non-fiction book by Charles Brewer Jones. It was published in 1999 by the University of Hawaiʻi Press.

== General references ==
- Barrett, T. H. (2000). "Review of Buddhism in Taiwan: Religion and the State, 1660-1990". The China Quarterly (161): 322–323. ISSN 0305-7410.
- Branch, Robert (2001). "Review of Buddhism in Taiwan: Religion and the State, 1660-1990". Buddhist-Christian Studies. 21: 133–134. ISSN 0882-0945.
- Goossaert, Vincent (2002). Goldfuss, Gabriele; Pittman, Don A.; Jones, Charles Brewer; Bianchi, Ester (eds.). "Review: Les Sciences sociales découvrent le bouddhisme chinois du XXe siècle". Archives de sciences sociales des religions (in French). 47 (120): 33–45. ISSN 0335-5985.
- Jorgensen, John (2000). "Review of Buddhism in Taiwan : Religion and the State 1660-1990 (glossary of Chinese characters)". Revue Bibliographique de Sinologie. 18: 415–416. ISSN 0080-2484.
- Wank, David L. (2001). "Review of Buddhism in Taiwan: Religion and the State, 1660-1990". China Review International. 8 (1): 150–153. ISSN 1069-5834.
- Weller, Robert P. (July 2000). "Buddhism in Taiwan: Religion and the State 1660-1990. Charles Brewer Jones". The China Journal. 44: 220–222. doi:10.2307/2667515. ISSN 1324-9347.
