= Huangtiandao =

Chinese folk religion

Huangtiandao (黃天道 "Way of the Yellow Sky / Heaven", also written with the homophonous characters 皇天道 "Way of the Kingly Sky"), also known as Huangtianism (黄天教 Huángtiān jiào) or Xuanguism (悬鼓教 Xuángǔ jiào, "Dark Drum teaching"), is a Chinese folk religious sect of northern China. It was founded by Li Bin (李賓), a former soldier who retired after losing an eye, in 1553 in Xuanhua, Hebei.

== See also ==
- Chinese folk religion
- Chinese salvationist religions

== Sources ==
- Shek, Richard (1982). "Millenarianism without rebellion: the Huangtiandao in north China". Modern China. 8 (3): 305–36. doi:10.1177/009770048200800302. S2CID 143817787.
- Cao, Xinyu (2013). "明清民間教門的地方化：鮮為人知的黃天道歷史 (Localized redemption: Unknown stories of the Yellow Heaven Way)". 清史研究 Qingshi Yanjiu. 2: 1–25.
- Seiwert, Hubert Michael (2003). Popular Religious Movements and Heterodox Sects in Chinese History. Brill. ISBN 9004131469.
