= Xuanyuan teaching =

Confucian folk religion founded in Taiwan

Church of Xuanyuan 軒轅教會 Xuānyuánjiàohuì
- Type: Confucian church
- Classification: Chinese salvationist religion
- Scripture: Four Books and Five Classics
- Founder: Wang Hansheng
- Origin: 1952; Taiwan
- Other name(s): Way of Xuanyuan (軒轅道), Huangdiism (黄帝教)
- Official website: http://huangdi-culture.org/

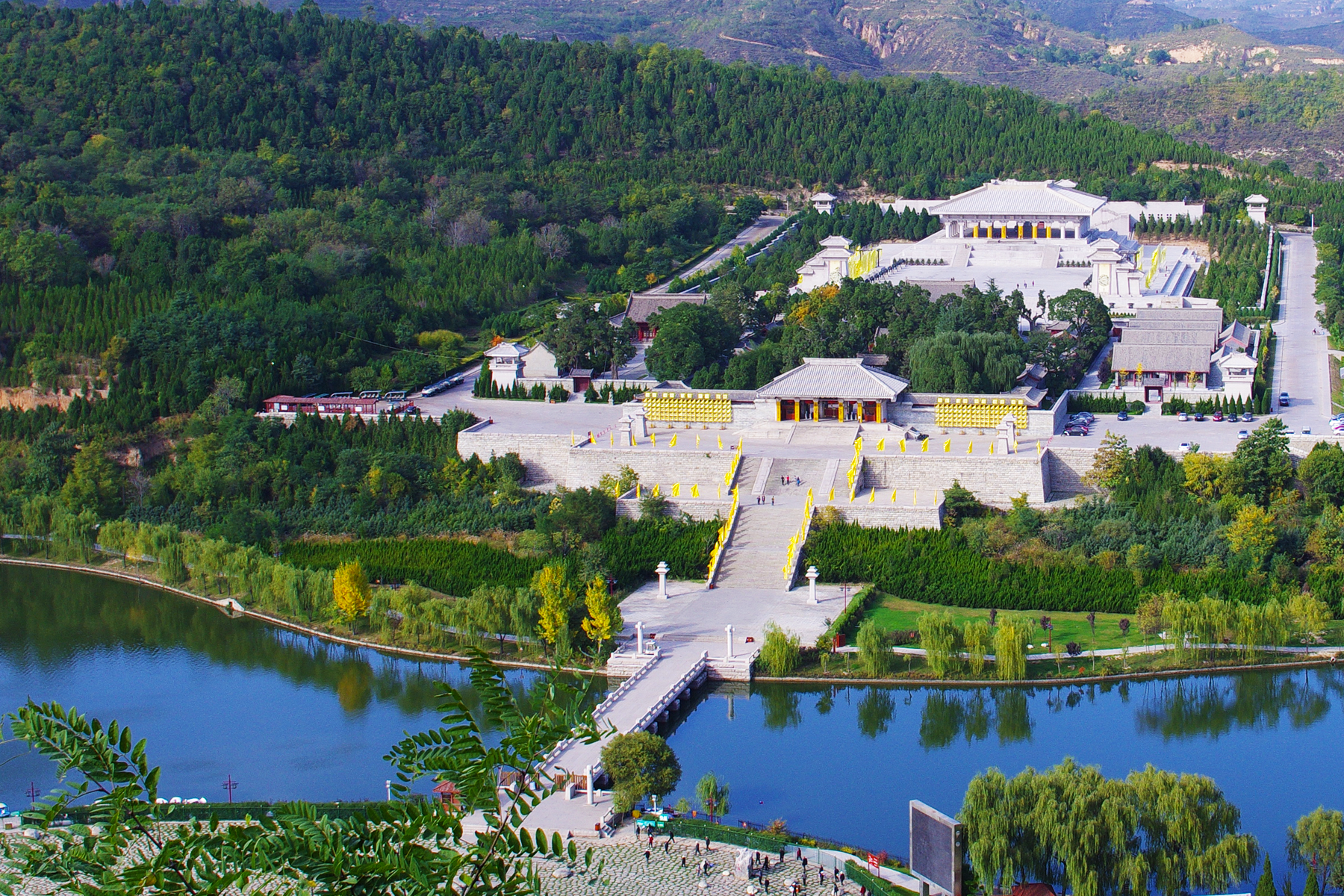
Xuanyuan Temple in Huangling, Yan'an, Shaanxi, at the ideal sacred centre of China

Xuanyuandao (軒轅道 "Way of Xuanyuan") (Note: 軒轅道 Xuānyuándào, traditional characters: 軒轅道. Xuanyuan is said to have been the Yellow Emperor's personal name.), also known as Xuanyuanism (軒轅教 (Note: 軒轅教 Xuānyuánjiào)) or Huangdiism (黄帝教 (Note: 黄帝教 Huángdìjiào, traditional characters: 黃帝教; "faith in the Yellow Deity")), is a Confucian folk religion of China which was founded in Taipei, Taiwan, in 1952. The founder was Wang Hansheng (王寒生) (1899–1989), a legislator. The Church of Xuanyuan aims to restore the "national religion" of archaic (pre-Han dynasty) China, with Huangdi as the universal God.

== Theology and practices ==
The Church of Xuanyuan subsumes all the ways of worship to local deities under one national god, Xuanyuan Huangdi (軒轅黄帝 "Xuanyuan the Yellow Deity" (Note: The color yellow [huáng 黄] represents earth, the dragon, and the centre of the universe [Shangdi] in Chinese cosmologies, and is used as a revelative character for the homophone huáng 皇 "august, generative".)). According to the Shiji, Xuanyuan was the name of Huangdi, and he is traditionally considered the thearch (progenitor god) of the Han Chinese race.

Xuanyuanism is based on Confucian rationalism, and therefore rejects practices it considers superstitious that are found in other sects of Chinese folk religion, such as scripture writing through god mediumship.

== Diffusion ==
As of 2013 the Xuanyuandao has 200,000 adherents in Taiwan and is also active in China, where it runs temples, schools, and members take part in the sacrifices celebrated at the Xuanyuan Temple, the largest temple dedicated to Huangdi in the world. Huangdi is also worshipped in Chinese folk religion by millions of people who do not necessarily belong to the Church of Xuanyuan.

== See also ==
- Chinese salvationist religions
- Confucian church

== Sources ==
- Christian Jochim, "Carrying Confucianism into the Modern World: The Taiwan Case". In Philip Clart, Charles Brewer Jones. Religion in Modern Taiwan: Tradition and Innovation in a Changing Society. University of Hawaii Press, 2003. ISBN 0824825640), pp. 48–83.
- Goossaert, Vincent, David Palmer. The Religious Question in Modern China. University of Chicago Press, 2011. ISBN 0226304167
- Patricia Eichenbaum Karetzky. Journal of Chinese Religions. Fall 1997, No. 25.
