= Haizidao =

Taoist new religious movement in Taiwan

- 亥子道
- Formation: 1984
- Type: New religious movement
- Location: Taiwan
- Affiliations: Taoism

Haizidao (Chinese: 亥子道; pinyin: Hàizi Dào; Wade–Giles: Hai Tze Tao) is a new religious movement in Taiwan, based on Taoism. The organisation was formed in 1984 for the purpose of saving human beings.
