= Chinese religions of fasting =

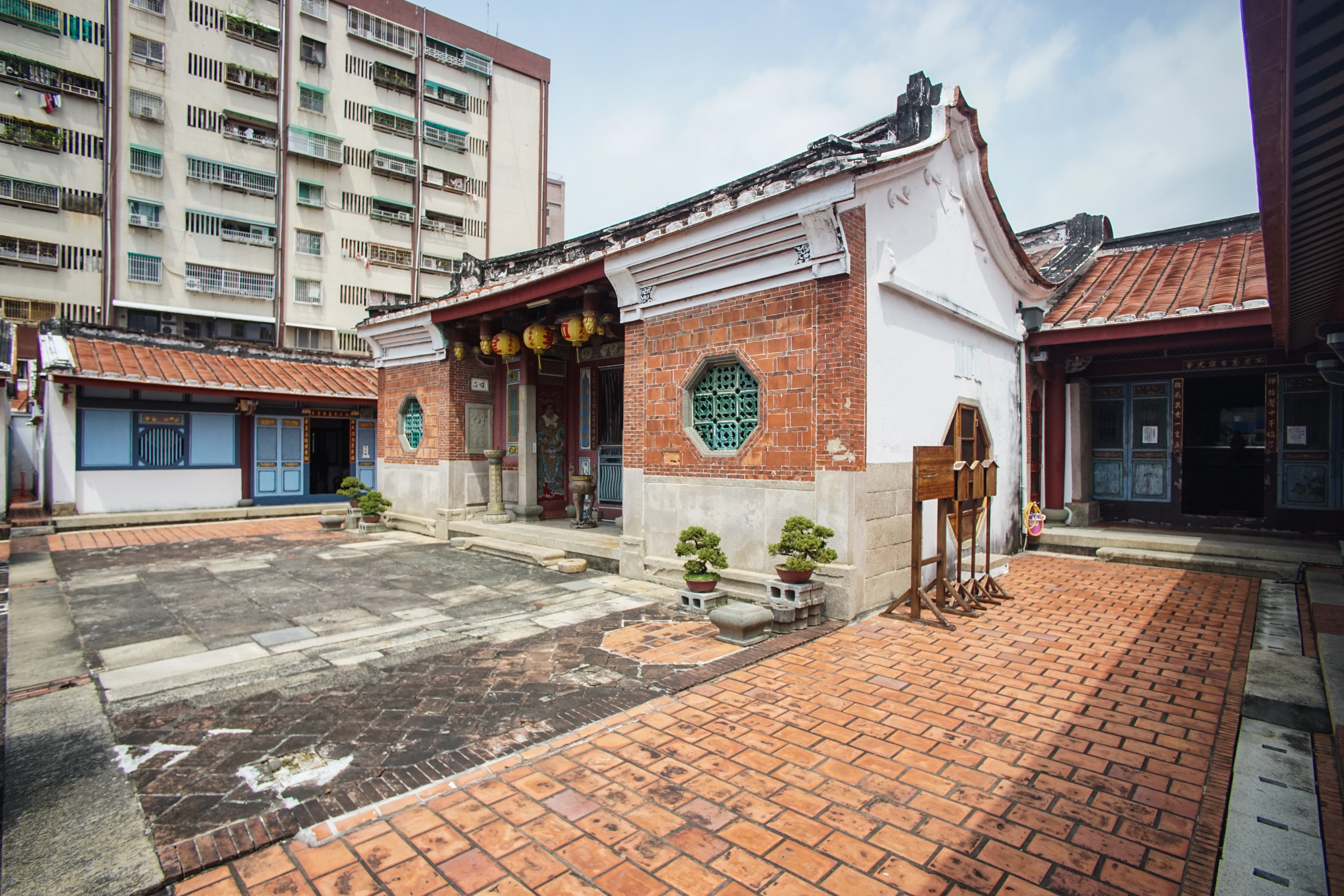
Sihuatang, a vegetarian temple (zhaitang 齋堂) in Tainan, Taiwan

The Chinese religions of fasting (simplified Chinese: 斋教; traditional Chinese: 齋教; pinyin: zhāijiāo; Pe̍h-ōe-jī: chai-kàu) are a subgroup of the Chinese salvationist religions. Their name refers to the strict vegetarian fasting diet that believers follow. This subgroup originated as the Lǎoguān zhāijiào (老官齋教 "Venerable Officials' teaching of fasting") sect that departed from the eastern "Great Vehicle" proliferation of Luoism in the 16th century and adopted features of the White Lotus tradition.

The Chinese religions of fasting are the following three:

- the Longhua sect (龍華教 "Dragon Flower");
- the Jintong sect (金幢教 "Golden Flag"); and
- the Xiantiandao (先天道 "Way of Former Heaven") tradition.

In the 1890s, a zhaijiao group assumed the functions of government in Gutian County, leading to the Kucheng Massacre.

== See also ==
- Chinese folk religion
- Chinese salvationist religions
- Luoism
- White Lotus

== Sources ==
- Seiwert, Hubert (1992). "Popular Religious Sects in Southeast China: Sect Connections and the Problem of the Luo Jiao/Bailian Jiao Dichotomy" (PDF). Journal of Chinese Religions. 20. doi:10.1179/073776992805307610. Archived from the original (PDF) on 2015-07-21.
- Philip Clart. University of British Columbia. The Phoenix and the Mother: The Interaction of Spirit Writing Cults and Popular Sects in Taiwan. On: Journal of Chinese Religions, n. 25, Fall 1997.
- Xisha Ma, Huiying Meng. Popular Religion and Shamanism. Brill, 2011. ISBN 9004174559
