= Baojuan =

Baojuan (Chinese: 宝卷; pinyin: bǎojuàn; lit. 'precious scrolls') are a genre of prosimetric texts (texts written in an alternation of prose and verse) of a religious or mystical nature, produced within the context of Chinese folk religion and individual Chinese folk religious sects. They are often written in vernacular Chinese and recount the mythology surrounding a deity or a hero, or constitute the theological and philosophical scriptures of organized folk sects. Baojuan is a type of performative text or storytelling found in China that emphasizes worship of ancient deities from Buddho-Daoist sects often recounting stories concerning suffering or apocalyptical scenarios. Because Baojuan was not considered a serious art-form for most of its existence, nonlinear records of baojuan make it difficult to credit writers, actors, and other contributors to the genre as very little, if any, mark of these individuals exist.

== Background ==
The modern study of “precious scrolls” (寶卷; baojuan) can be said to begin with the publication by Zheng Zhenduo 鄭振鐸 of his Foqu xulu (佛曲敘錄), which is a catalogue of Buddhist songs published in 1927 in Zhongguo wenxue yanjiu (中國文學研究; "Studies on Chinese Literature"). An explicit start date for Baojuan is not known, but scholars generally place it on a timeline in three parts: a first (early), second (middle), and third (late) period with each period corresponding to a new development within the genre. The date range looked at by scholars begins in the 13th century (Ming) and ends in the early 20th century (Qing) with the three periods separated as follows: 13th-15th being designated as the early period, the 16th-18th date range being designated as the middle period, and ending finally with the 19th-20th centuries being designated as the late period. Within each period, there were notable developments within Baojuan literature, from its earliest inception during the early period as simply "propagating" Buddhist beliefs to the late period where it takes on a new and secular foothold within the culture of areas where it was most practiced (Jiangsu Province).

Baojuan is still found today in parts of China - most notably Changshu city located in Jiangsu Province - sometimes called "telling scriptures." "Telling scriptures" refers to special groups of actors or individuals who may perform Baojuan stories as plays or recitations to common folk of the town in temples or other places. This type of storytelling emphasizes Buddhist teachings and morals but has also been known to highlight historical figures.

== List ==
- The Precious Scroll of the Immortal Maiden Equal to Heaven
- The Precious Scroll of Mulian Rescuing his Mother in Three Rebirths
