= Robin Munro =

British legal scholar, author, and human rights advocate (1952–2021)

Robin Munro (1 June 1952 – 19 May 2021) was a British legal scholar, author, and human rights advocate. He received his PhD from the Department of Law, School of Oriental & African Studies, University of London.

== Career ==
From 1989 to 1998, he served as the principal China researcher and Director of the Hong Kong office of Human Rights Watch, during which he witnessed firsthand the Tiananmen Square protests of 1989 and their suppression by the government. He was also one of the foreigners who remained at the square until the students left, stating that he did not see a massacre at that location and emphasizing that the real casualties were not students at the Square, but rather workers and ordinary people.

In his 1993 book, “Black Hands of Beijing", Munro wrote, "There was no massacre in Tiananmen Square.. But on the western approach roads... there was a blood bath that claimed hundreds of lives. To insist on this distinction is not splitting hairs. What took place was the slaughter not of students but of ordinary workers and residents—precisely the target that the Chinese government had intended.”

From 1999 to 2001, he was the Sir Joseph Hotung Senior Research Fellow at the Law Department and Centre of Chinese Studies, University of London’s School of Oriental and African Studies. He also worked for Amnesty International.

Munro served as the Research Director of the China Labour Bulletin, a Hong Kong–based organisation which promotes labour rights in China. He extensively wrote about the psychiatric abuse of the Falun Gong sect and other groups in China. In 2008 he testified before the United States Congress on the impact of the 2008 Olympic Games on human rights and the rule of law in China.

He died on 19 May 2021 at the age of 68.

== Bibliography ==
Below is a partial list of works. A full bibliography with links to most items can be found at https://git.io/Jn2Hv.

- China’s Psychiatric Inquisition: Dissent, Psychiatry and the Law in Post-1949 China, (London: Wildy Simmonds and Hill, 2006)
- Dangerous Minds: Political Psychiatry in China Today and its Origins in the Mao Era (New York: Human Rights Watch and Geneva Initiative on Psychiatry, 2002)
- (with Jeff Rigsby) Death By Default: A Policy of Fatal Neglect in China’s State Orphanages (New York: Human Rights Watch, 1996)
- Detained in China and Tibet: a directory of political and religious prisoners (New York: Human Rights Watch, 1994) ISBN 1-56432-105-3, ISBN 978-1-56432-105-3
- (with George Black) Black Hands of Beijing: Lives of Defiance in China’s Democracy Movement (New York: John Wiley and Sons, 1993)
- (with Tang Baiqiao) Anthems of Defeat: Crackdown in Hunan Province, 1989-92 (New York: Human Rights Watch, 1992)
- Punishment season: human rights in China after martial law (New York: Human Rights Watch, 1990) ISBN 0-929692-51-9, ISBN 978-0-929692-51-7
- Syncretic sects and secret societies: revival in the 1980s (Armonk, NY: M.E. Sharpe, 1989)
