= Chen Hongzhen =

Teacher Bodhisattva Chen Hongzhen
- 陳鴻珍
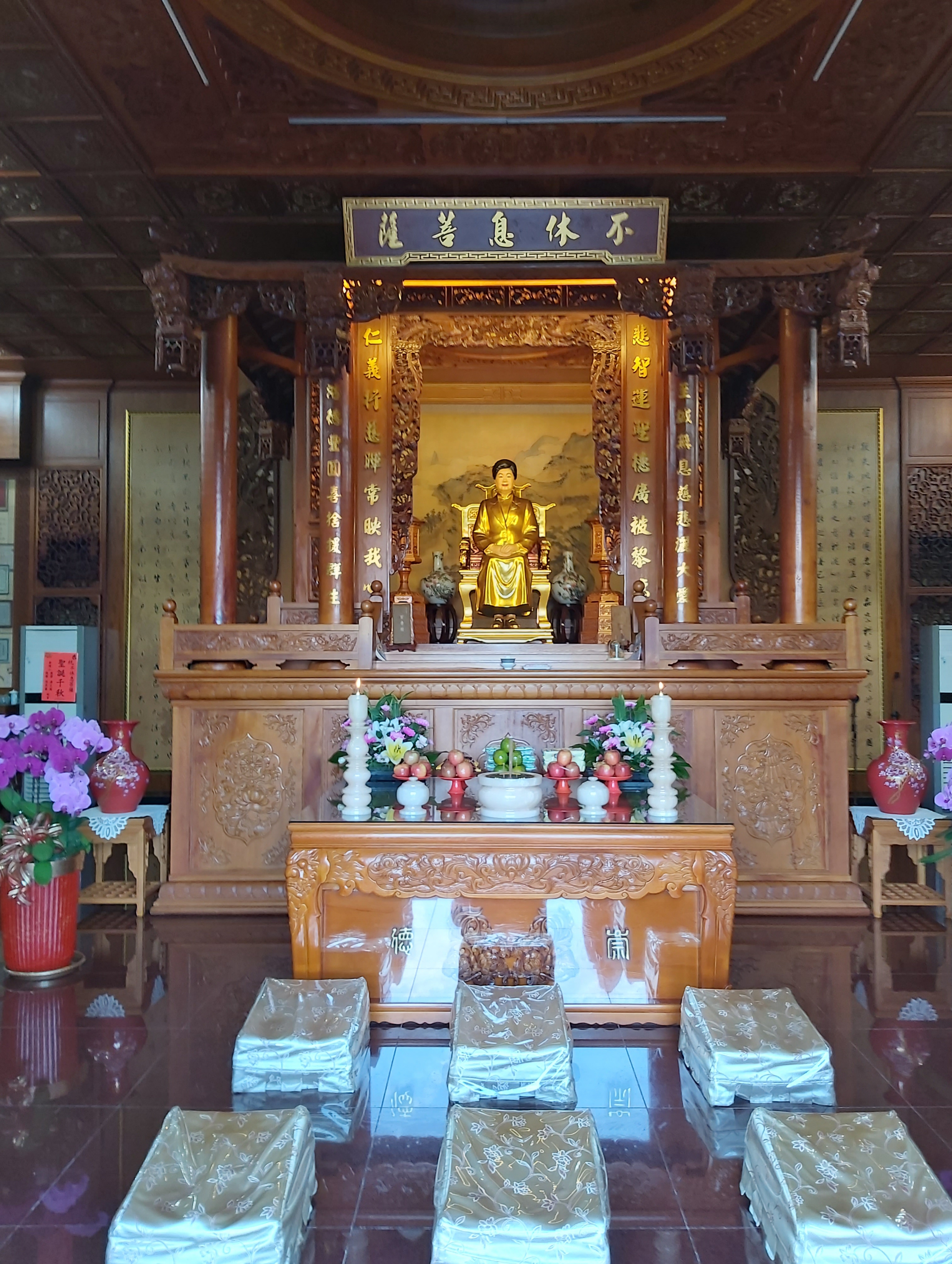
- Statue of Chen Hongzhen at Wufeng District, Taichung.
- Title: Chairman of the Chongde Cultural and Educational Foundation

Personal life
- Born: 30 November 1923 Tianjin, Zhili Province, Republic of China
- Died: 6 January 2008 (aged 84) Taiwan
- Resting place: Chongde Memorial Park, Wufeng District, Taichung,Taiwan
- Parents: Chen Fengming (father); Lady Yan (mother)
- Other name: 陳大姑
- Posthumous name: Never-resitng Bodhisattva (不休息菩薩)

Religious life
- Religion: Yiguandao
- School: Fayi Group (發一組)
- Sect: Fayi Chongde (發一崇德)

Senior posting
- Teacher: Sun Suzhen, Han Yulin
- Successor: Han Wannian
- Awards: Order of Brilliant Star, third rank

Chen Hongzhen was born in Tianjin in the 12th year of the Republic of China calendar (1923) on the 23rd day of the 10th lunar month, November 30 in the Gregorian calendar. Her family became rich through business. Her father, Chen Fengming, was the Tianjin Grocery Merchant Association president and was enthusiastic about public welfare. It is said that before Chen Hongzhen was born, her grandmother and mother, Lady Yan, dreamed of Guanyin sending her son to the Chen family ancestral hall. Her parents named her "Hongzhen" because they hoped she would have a bright future under the protection of Guanyin Bodhisattva. There are two younger brothers and four younger sisters in his family.

In 1940, Yiguandao was introduced to Gong Penngling, the disciple of Jingdian Temple in Tianjin Mingde Tan. Later, it was mainly practiced in the Tongxing Tan Taoist temple, founded by Han Yulin. In 1947, he went to Taiwan to preach on the instructions of Zhang Tianran. Half a year later, he returned to Tianjin for treatment due to acclimatization. In 1948, he participated in the "confession class" after Zhang Tianran's death and decided to make a vow of purity (celibacy for life). In August of the same year, he went to Taiwan to preach again with Han Yulin. In 1950, Han Yulin awarded him the position of Bianchi and founded a group of disciples affiliated with the fa group. Chongde Dojo.

1985, the Little Angel Class was established to care for Taoist children. She successfully established five cultural and educational foundations in Taiwan: Chongde, Chongren, Chongyi, Chongli, and Guanghui, as well as a Chongde Charitable Foundation, and promoted filial piety.

After her death on January 6, 2008, Yiguandao announced that Queen Mother of the West had named her the "Never-resting Bodhisattva". During the farewell ceremony, Ma Ying-jeou knelt and kowtowed three times. The then President of the Republic of China, Chen Shui-bian, also issued a commendation order.

Chen Hongzhen, chairman of the Chongde Cultural and Educational Foundation and vice-chairman of the Yiguandao World Federation, has a chaste and persevering nature and a bright and bright mind. She practiced diligently in his early years and came to Taiwan to open a wasteland and explain his teachings. She did not avoid the difficulties and achieved great success. Daily, she enjoys teaching about ancient times and has a heart to benefit the public. She is the chairman of the Chongde Cultural and Educational Foundation, Puli Guangming Charity Home and Xiluo Xinyi Kindergarten. She promotes ethics and morals and is committed to caring for disadvantaged groups, promoting religious exchanges, Expanding the mission of spreading Dharma overseas, being benevolent and sound, and benefiting all living beings. She has been awarded the National Good People and Good Deeds Award, the Ministry of Education's Social Education Promotion Individual Award, the Ministry of Home Affairs' Social Service Medal, the Thai Royal Social Welfare Medal, and the Third Class Medal of Stars. His achievements are outstanding, and all admire her. To sum up his life, she benefited the people for some time, promoted Taoism and Shushi for sixty years, cultivated herself and settled people, and helped Yongjia. I heard that she passed away and mourned deeply. She should be commended explicitly for showing the government's sincere memory of Xin Xian.

— Chen Shui-bian, Chen Shui-bian, Presidential Order (Hua Zong Er Rong Zi No. 09710004161)
