= Maitreya teachings =

Aspect of Buddhist teachings

The Maitreya teachings or Maitreyanism (Chinese: 弥勒教; pinyin: Mílèjiào; lit. 'Maitreya teachings'), also called Mile teachings, refers to the beliefs related to Maitreya (彌勒 Mílè in Chinese) practiced in China together with Buddhism and Manichaeism, and were developed in different ways both in the Chinese Buddhist schools and in the sect salvationist traditions of Chinese folk religion.

Maitreya was the central deity worshipped by the first folk salvation religions, but in later developments of the sects he was gradually replaced by the Limitless Ancient Mother (無生老母 Wúshēng Lǎomǔ), although Maitreyan eschatology continued to have a place in their doctrines.

Folk Buddhist movements that worshipped and awaited Maitreya are recorded at least back to the years between 509 and 515 (6th century). A notorious event was the rebellion led by monk Faqing from Jizhou City, then Northern Wei, in the name of a "new Buddha". Later, Maitreyan beliefs developed conspicuously outside the boundaries of Buddhism. By 715, as testified by an edict, wearing white clothes, that was originally a practice common to lay Buddhist congregations, had become a distinctive feature of Maitreyan sects.

== Belief ==
Generally, the belief of these Maitreya sects is that Maitreya, as a Bodhisattva, has descended from Tusita Heaven and has come to the world and attained Buddhahood. With the descent of Maitreya Buddha, they believe that the time of Sakyamuni Buddha has passed and the time of Maitreya Buddha has begun and expect the world to change into a world filled with happiness and prosperity everywhere.

Maitreyanism proposes the salvific idea of “Three Buddhas answering to Three Periods (Ages)”, and classifies human history into three eras, the Qingyang (Green-sun) Period led by Dipankara Buddha, the Hongyang (Red-sun) Period led by Sakyamuni Buddha, and the Baiyang (White-sun) Period led by Maitreya Buddha after his descent into the world. For this sect, the chaos of society signaled a new phase of social development, and strongly conveyed the idea of “the decline of Sakyamuni Buddha and the leadership of the world by Maitreya Buddha.”

Maitreya was the main figure worshipped in the early days of the Maitreya sects, however, in their development, the role was gradually replaced by the Eternal Venerable Mother (無生老母 Wúshēng Lǎomǔ), although Maitreya's eschatology continued in their doctrines. Lao Mu was placed as the supreme deity who orchestrated the descent of the Three Buddhas in three periods to save the world."

== History ==
The belief in Maitreya began in the late Han Dynasty. Buddhist texts about Maitreya in China come from translations by the monks An Shiao (安世高), Lokaksema in the 2nd century, Dharmaraksa (竺法護) in the 3rd century, Dao-An (道安) in the 4th century, and Kumarajiva in the 5th century. The belief in being reborn in Maitreya's place, the Tusita realm, originated from these translated texts. Mahayana Buddhism has two concepts of holy land, the pure land of Amitabha and the holy land of Maitreya. The concept of Maitreya's holy land was so popular that in the 4th-6th centuries, the belief in Maitreya spreads throughout China. This belief was mixed with the folk belief in the heaven of Xi Wang Mu, which had been believed for hundreds of years.

During the Northern and Southern Dynasties (420-589), a large number of Maitreyan “pseudo-scriptures” emerged. The emergence of the pseudo-scriptures was closely related to the difficult conditions of society at that time. In other words, when difficult living conditions prevailed and criminals were rampant in society, people in general yearned for a “messiah”, like Maitreya, who could vanquish all the villains and stabilize the world. At that time, there began to be people claiming to be incarnations of Maitreya Buddha who would be the savior and change the world.

During the reign of Emperor Wu of Liang, Fu Dashi (傅大士), a native of Yiwu in Wuzhou, was a famous Buddhist monk who referred to himself as the “Wise and Benevolent Master who had been enlightened under the Shuanglin Tree”, and who had attained the Samadhi of Shurangama and Anasravajnana, began to spread belief in Maitreya. At that time, belief in Maitreya was very popular and a group was born that believed in and worshiped Maitreya. This is one of the early traces of the Maitreya sect (彌勒教). Forty years after Fu Dashi's death, there is a movement called Jianguomenzhibian (建國門之變) emerged, a political movement that used Maitreya Buddha of Maitreya sect to carry out a rebellious movement to overthrow the government and establish a new state.

During the reign of Emperor Xuanwu of the Northern Wei, Faqing (法庆), a monk from Jizhou, proclaimed himself the “New Buddha” (新佛), with Li Gueibe (李歸伯) as the “Tenth-Level Bodhisattva” (十住菩薩), claiming to attain Buddhahood through the Bodhisattva path thus calling himself the “Great Vehicle Buddha” (大乘佛) and founded the Mahayana sect (大乘教), also known as the Mahayana Maitreya sect (彌勒大乘教). He quotes from Buddhist scriptures saying that Maitreya is the next Buddha and states that “Maitreya Buddha has descended to save the world replacing Sakyamuni Buddha”. Contrary to Buddhism, he created the doctrine of “killing people to create chaos” and believed that killing one person would become a Bodhisattva of first-stage, killing ten people would become a Bodhisattva of the tenth stage. He and his followers destroyed Buddhist temples, beheaded monks and nuns, and burned sutras and statues while proclaiming “The new Buddha has appeared who will eradicate the old demons.” He also used illegal drugs and drove those who took them mad so that parents, children and siblings did not know each other, and would only kill and maim each other.“ This rebellion came to be known as the "Faqing Rebellion” (法慶之亂), which was later suppressed by Yuan Yao (元遙). From then on, there were many rebellions with “Maitreya Buddha has descended to the world” as the main slogan. Rebellions also occurred in the Wuchengjun region of eastern Shanxi, where two sect leaders from the “mountain barbarians” attracted a large following characterized by dressing in white and using white umbrellas and banners. The teachings also involved wishing upon Maitreya.

In the ninth year of Emperor Yang's reign, Song Zixian (宋子賢), a native of Gaoyang, Hebei, was a skilled sorcerer who “could transform himself into a Buddha” and claimed to be an “emanation of Maitreya Buddha”, and gathered people to start a rebellion. According to the Book of Sui (隋书), two more rebellions took place in 613 under the pretext of Maitreya's birth. In both rebellions, the number of people involved reached tens of thousands, and Maitreya was even more intense.“ In the Tang Dynasty, there were many movements that arose in the lower society with Maitreya's concept of salvation for the next life, such as the uprising of all-white Maitreya sect followers led by Xiang Haiming (向海明) in 613 and the turmoil initiated by Wang Huaigu (王怀古), a native of Beizhou, in the early years of the Tang Dynasty (713) with the slogan "The time of Sakyamuni has ended, a new Buddha has been born".

In the 10th century, there was an eccentric monk named Qici (契此), who lived during the Liang Dynasty (907-923 AD) in China. This monk was known as Budai, which is often referred to as Hotei in Japanese culture. He became a popular figure in the Buddhist tradition, especially in Mahayana Buddhism and East Asian culture. Budai is often associated with Maitreya Buddha (the future Buddha) in some Buddhist traditions. Budai has since been used as a figurehead by those who believe that Maitreya was born.

In the seventh year of Qingli's reign of the Northern Song Dynasty (1047), Wang Ze (王則), a farmer from Beizhou (present-day Qinghe, Hebei), who originally from Zhuozhou went to Beizhou to work as a sheepherder for a landowner, rebelled against the government and claimed to be the ruler of Dongping (东平郡主), with the slogan, “The time of Sakyamuni Buddha has passed, now Maitreya Buddha rules”. In addition, Gao Tancheng (高曇晟), a Buddhist monk from Huaizhou, and Liu Ningjing (劉凝靜), a woman from Wannian County in Sichuan, all claimed that Maitreya had descended to the world and rebelled." A novel titled The Three Sui Quash the Demons' Revolt (三遂平妖傳) by Luo Guanzhong in its content reflects the general public's view of Maitreya at that time.

From the Northern Wei Dynasty to Song Dynasty, popular riots based on belief in Maitreya and with the slogan of Maitreya's incarnation reflected the strong desire of the people for the arrival and salvation of the savior in this world. This desire was rooted in the internal structure of society, and manifested in the form of Maitreya belief, which became an ideological expression and action guide for conflicts between the social classes of society. From the Song Dynasty onwards, there was a tendency for a syncretism between Maitreya and Manichaeism. Legends that Maitreya Buddha had descended to save the world were widespread in society, and the White Lotus Sect was the most famous. The White Lotus Sect absorbed the belief in Maitreya and called for saving the world by claiming that Maitreya Buddha would be born and start a rebellion, which naturally led to the start of the rebellion against the Yuan Dynasty's rule. In the spring of the 17th year of Kublai Khan's reign, Du Keyong (杜可用) from Duchang, Jiangxi province, who called himself “Du Shengren (杜聖人)”, started a rebellion with the White Lotus Sect and later called himself “King of Heaven (天王)”, and changed his name to “Wanshan (萬乘)”. This was the first civil uprising instigated by the White Lotus Sect after its formation; however, as the historical distinction between the White Lotus faction (白蓮宗) and the White Lotus sect (白蓮教) is unclear, this could also be considered the White Lotus Sect's first civil uprising.

During the reign of the Yuan dynasty, Külüg Khan banned the White Lotus faction and the Maitreya Sect. At that time, there was a man named Shi Pudu (釋普度) from Donglin Temple in Lushan, who had inherited the millenarian teachings left by Huiyuan (慧遠), and was committed to reviving the White Lotus faction. As a result, the White Lotus faction rose in 1312, during the reign of Emperor Renzong. Pudu was appointed head of the sect, and became known as You Tan Zhongzu (優曇宗主). During the period when policies against religious groups were not that strict, the White Lotus faction flourished freely, the White Lotus faction preached the “Birth of Maitreya Buddha” and the “Birth of Light King”, and spread as far as Henan, Jianghuai, and the Yangtze River Valley area. However, conditions were not very good at the time, and due to some social unrest, the sect was banned again after the second year of Emperor Yingzong's reign (1322).

Afterward, the monks of the White Lotus faction gradually abandoned “White Lotus school” and returned to orthodox Buddhism, while there were still many members of the group who secretly spread the teachings. The White Lotus faction (白蓮宗教) at that time began to merge with the Maitreya Sect (彌勒教) and Ming Sect (明教) and called their group the White Lotus Sect (白蓮教), and became a secret religion that secretly spread the teachings. In the second year of the Taiding era (1325), Zhao Chousi (趙丑廝) and Guo Pusa (郭菩薩) of the White Lotus Sect in Xizhou, Henan Province, preached that “Maitreya Buddha will rule the world” and gathered many people to rebel. In the third year of Emperor Shun's reign (1337), the White Lotus Sect in Chenzhou, Henan Province, claimed that Maitreya Buddha had been born and gathered to burn incense. In the fourth year of Emperor Shun's reign (1338), Peng Yingyu (彭瑩玉) who was the head of the Maitreya Sect and Zhou Ziwang (周子旺), a monk from Yuanzhou, Jiangxi Province (now Yichun, Hubei Province), persuaded the people to recite the name of Maitreya Buddha, burning torches and incense at night, and holding rituals, and organized a rebellion of the White Lotus Sect, which was based on the Manichaean belief of “Belief in the Bright Light” (崇尚光亮信仰).

In the 11th year of Emperor Shun's reign (1351), the Yuan Dynasty blocked the Yellow River, which sparked the Red Turban Rebellion across the country. The Red Turban was closely associated with the White Lotus, and at the end of the Yuan Dynasty, the reign of Emperor Hongwu, after the Han Shantong (韓山童) Rebellion of the White Lotus Sect, proclaimed that “darkness will soon pass, and light will soon arrive.“ At this point, the Maitreya sect had officially blended and merged into the White Lotus Sect and blended its teachings with Manichaean and Confucian traditions." The Red Turban Movement originated with Peng Yingyu (彭瑩玉), a Buddhist monk, who led a rebellion in Yuanzhou (present-day Jiangxi) in 1338. A rebel leader, Zhou Ziwang (周子旺), was proclaimed emperor, but he was quickly arrested by local authorities and executed. Peng fled north and spread the teachings about the coming of Maitreya, the Buddha of fortune and his rays of light illuminating all humanity, who would end suffering. The influence of the Red Turban appeared in many places along the Huai River from 1340 onwards."

In 1362, Ming Yuzhen (明玉珍) established the state of Daxia (明夏; 1363–1371), in Sichuan, which banned Taoism and orthodox Buddhism, and established Maitreya Buddhism as the state religion by building various Maitreya Buddhist Temples. From the end of the Yuan dynasty, reports of the Maitreya sect appeared frequently and were well documented during the Ming and Qing dynasties to the present day.

A Second White Lotus Rebellion broke out in 1796 among impoverished settlers in the mountainous region that separates Sichuan from Hubei and Shaanxi as a protest against heavy taxes imposed by the Manchu rulers of the Qing Dynasty. It was initially a protest against tax collection but quickly escalated into a widespread armed uprising. The rebels used guerrilla tactics, exploiting the mountainous terrain to evade Qing forces. The rebellion was eventually suppressed in 1804.

In 1813, there was a major uprising in the late Qing Dynasty started by the religious sect Tianli Sect (天理教) known as the Eight Trigrams Rebellion (八卦教). The movement was closely related to the teachings of the Maitreya sect, mainly due to the ideological beliefs of its followers who believed in the coming of Maitreya as the savior of the world and the creation of a new age and world. Lin Qing, who was one of the leaders of the rebellion, declared himself the reincarnation of Maitreya, the prophesied future Buddha in Buddhism, using banners with the inscription "Entrusted by Heaven to Prepare the Way", a reference to the popular novel Water Margin.

In the 20th century, the Maitreya sect in its original form had undergone many changes or declined in popularity, especially in mainland China due to the heavy suppression of many religious sects in 1949. However, the teachings of the Maitreya sect or elements of it still live on and influence some religious or spiritual sects to this day. Taiwan is home to various religious traditions that include elements of the Maitreya sect. Among the popular religions that are considered to share the same ideology and characteristics as the Maitreya sect are Xiantiandao (先天道) and Yiguandao (一貫道), which combines the teachings of Confucianism, Taoism, and Buddhism.

== See also ==
- White Lotus
- Chinese salvationist religions
- Three Suns (eschatology)
- Yiguandao
- Xiantiandao
- Luo teaching
- Miledadao

== Sources ==
- Seiwert, Hubert Michael (2003). Popular Religious Movements and Heterodox Sects in Chinese History. Brill. ISBN 9004131469.
- Ma, Xisha; Meng, Huiying (2011). Popular Religion and Shamanism. BRILL. ISBN 9004174559.
- Zhuo, Xinping; Zhao, Dong (2019), Religious Faith of the Chinese, Springer, ISBN 9789811348679
- Ritzinger, Justin (2017), Anarchy in the Pure Land Reiventing the Cult of Maitreya in Modern Chinese Buddhism, Oxford University Press, ISBN 0190491167
