= Lu Zhongyi =

Chinese religious leader (1849–1925)

- 路中一
- Title: 17th Taoist Patriarch (Yiguandao)

Personal life
- Born: 18 May 1853 Jining, Qing dynasty
- Died: 26 February 1925 (aged 71)
- Other names: Tung Li Zu; Jin Gong Zu Shi

Religious life
- Religion: Yiguandao
- Sect: Yiguandao

Senior posting
- Period in office: 1905 – 1925
- Predecessor: Liu Qingxu
- Successor: Lu Zhongjie (Acting, 1925-1930) Since 1930: Zhang Tianran; Sun Suzhen
- Reincarnation: Maitreya
- Years&nsbp;of&nsbp;service: 1861 – 1895

Chinese name
- Traditional Chinese: 路中一
- Simplified Chinese: 路中一
Transcriptions
Standard Mandarin
- Hanyu Pinyin: Lù Zhōngyī
- Wade–Giles: Lu Chung I

Lu Zhongyi (Chinese: 路中一; 18 May 1849 – 26 February 1925) was the seventeenth patriarch of Yiguandao. His religious titles were Tung Li Zu and Jin Gong Zu Shi (金公祖師; Golden Elder). Lu is, according to Yiguandao doctrine, the incarnation of Maitreya.

== Early life ==
He was born on May 18, 1853 (the 24th day of the 4th Lunar month) in 1853, in Jining, in China's Shandong province. (Note: There is differences regarding the year of birth in some reference sources. The book The Flying Phoenix: Aspects of Chinese Sectarianism in Taiwan by David K. Jordan & Daniel L. Overmyer wrote year of birth as 1953, in line with the explanation in the journal published in 中國評論學術出版社 that Lu Zhongyi was born during the Taiping Revolution (1851-1864). Meanwhile, Yiguandao groups have written different years in their brief biographical explanations of Luzhongyi in their respective books and websites. Some wrote 1948, some wrote 1949, some wrote 1952 and some wrote 1953.) He was said to be illiterate, his father died when he was young, left with his mother and sister Lu Zhongjie (路中節). He joined the army at age 22 and became an officer in the Manzhou Dongbei (Manchuria) government.

== Yiguandao leadership ==
In 1895, he was said to have a dream from the Heavenly Mother for three days continuously instructing him to become the student of the 16th patriarch Liu Qingxu (Wang Jueyi's successor) and became Liu's household servant for several years. (Note: In some references from Yiguandao, it is mentioned that Lu Zhongyi had a dream in 1895 and had just followed patriarch Liu in that year. While texts from academic books (Jordan, 1985, p215 & Ma, 2011, p309) mention that Lu became patriarch Liu's servant in 1883.) In 1905, in Qingzhou, there is instruction from the Heavenly Mother through spirit writing wrote that Lu Zhongyi was appointed to be the next patriarch and the "celestial mandate" was given to him in that year. (Note: There are several versions of the year in which Lu Zhongyi took over the leadership, Yiguandao and some historical documents write Lu took over the leadership and became the 17th patriarch on the instructions from Lao Mu based on spirit writing in 1905. While according to academic books (Jordan, 1985 & Ma, 2011), Lu took over the leadership after Liu had a dream of receiving instructions in 1886. While certain references (Lu, 2008 & DuBois, 2005), Lu is written to have taken over the leadership after patriarch Liu died in 1919.) Since then he became the 17th patriarch of Yiguandao. Yiguandao followers believe that he is the first leader of the "White Sun" Era, the last era of the Three Stages Final Kalpa, thus he is the incarnation of savior Maitreya or Hotei.

At first he tried to spread the teachings in patriarch Liu's hometown of Qingzhou, but it did not go well as many people did not believe in his preaching. In 1919, after patriarch Liu died, Lu Zhongyi brought his teaching to his hometown, Jining, and succeeded in recruiting many followers. He established an altar there and used the “three talents” (三才) for spirit writing ritual to spread the teachings on the lower class of the people, resulting in the great development in the countryside. Within a few years, Lu had attracted several hundred followers, based around a small core of twenty-five disciples, some of whom went to the neighboring provinces of Henan, Hebei, and Shanxi to spread the teachings. Lu has 8 main disciples namely Hao Baoshan (郝寶山), Chu Jingfu (褚敬福), Liang Zhaogong (梁兆功), Zhao Huaizhong (趙懷中), Chen Liyue (陳禮月), Zheng Zhenchang (鄭振昌), Nie Xijun (聶錫鈞) and Zhang Tianran (張天然).

== Death ==
Lu died on February 26 (the 2nd day of the 2nd lunar month) in 1925. On March 3rd of the following year, Patriarch Lu's borrowed the body of a person named Yang Chun-Ling to chant the “True Sutra of Maitreya Buddha Saving from Suffering” (彌勒救苦真經). Thus, Lu's younger sister Lu Zhongjie (also known as Lao Gu Nai Nai, Mistress of the Old Cave) who was believed to be the incarnation of bodhisattva Guanyin (known by Yiguandao followers as Nan Hai Gu Fo (南海古佛), Ancient Buddha of the Southern Sea), temporarily took over the leadership for twelve years, but later reduced to six years by heavenly instruction.

Zhang and Sun became the successors through spirit writing by the Heavenly Mother. However, the other seven major disciples of Lu refused his succession. In 1930, Zhang officially was bestowed the leadership as the 18th patriarch of Yiguandao in Jinan.

== See also ==
- Zhang Tianran
- Sun Suzhen
- Yiguandao
- Budai
- List of Buddha claimants

== Sources ==
- Lu, Yunfeng (2008), The Transformation of Yiguan Dao in Taiwan: Adapting to a Changing Religious Economy, Lexington Books, ISBN 978-0739117194
- Ma, Xisha; Huiying Meng (2011), Popular Religion and Shamanism, Brill, ISBN 978-9004174559
- Jordan, David; Daniel Overmyer (1985), The Flying Phoenix: Aspects of Chinese Sectarianism in Taiwan, Princeton University Press, ISBN 069107304X
- 林, 榮澤 (2009), 一貫道藏, 一貫義理編輯苑, ISBN 9789868383128
- Billioud, Sébastien (2020), Reclaiming the Wilderness: Contemporary Dynamics of the Yiguandao, Oxford University Press, ISBN 978-0197529133
- DuBois, Thomas David (2005), The Sacred Village: Social Change and Religious LIfe in Rural North China, University of Hawaii Press, ISBN 0824828372
- Soo, Khin Wah (1997), A study of the Yiguan Dao (Unity Sect) and its development in Peninsular Malaysia, University of British Columbia, doi:10.14288/1.0088243
