= Liu Qingxu =

16th Patriarch of Yiguandao

- 劉清虛

Personal life
- Born: Liu Shichang; 1848 Qingzhou, Shandong, Qing Dynasty
- Died: 1918 (aged 70)
- Known for: 16th Yiguandao Patriarch
- Other names: Liu Huapu; Liu Zhigang

Religious life
- Religion: Yiguandao

Senior posting
- Period in office: 1886–1905
- Predecessor: Wang Jueyi
- Successor: Lu Zhongyi
- Reincarnation: Jiang Ziya

Liu Qingxu (Hanzi: 劉清虛; Pinyin: Liú qīngxū) or Liu Huapu (Hanzi: 劉化普; Pinyin: Liúhuàpǔ) or Liu Zhigang (Hanzi: 劉至剛; Pinyin: Liúzhìgāng, 1848–1918), was the 16th patriarch in the Yiguandao lineage. He was the one who gave the name Yiguandao (一貫道) to the religious group he led in 1886.

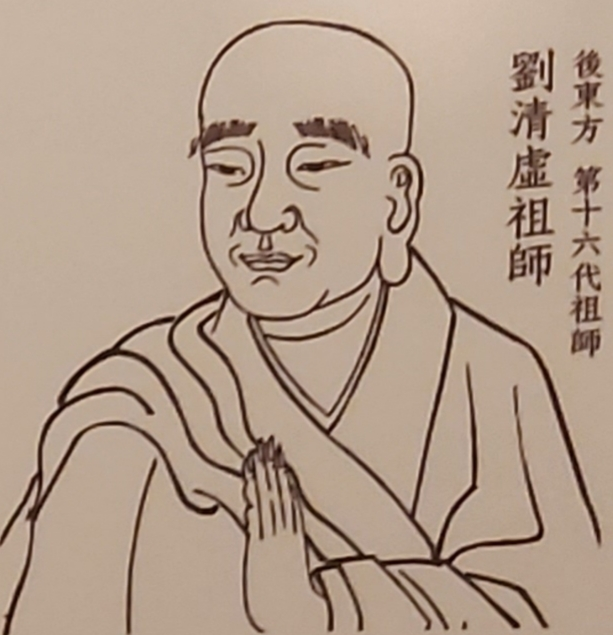
Liu Qingxu's paintings

== Early life ==
He was born in 1949 and is a native of Liujiajing, Qingzhou, Shandong, named Shichang (世昌), known as old man Xu (虚老人), his father was an official in the imperial court, and he himself was a feudal intellectual who was deeply influenced by Confucianism.

== Yiguandao Leadership ==
Liu Zhigang was one of the special disciples of Wang Jueyi (王覺一). During Wang's lifetime, Liu became the leader of the Mohou Yizhu Jiao (末后一着教) group in Hankou. According to Wang Jitai (王继泰), the son of Wang Jueyi, in 1883, he and his father went to Hankou to meet Liu Zhigang, Zhao Yunshan and Xiong Dingguo and were told that there had been a great number of followers in Wuhan and Jingzhou. Therefore, Liu together with Wang Jueyi and Wang Jitai came to the understanding that they should call on the followers to stage a rebellion in Wuhan. Unexpectedly, the authorities in Wuchang seemed became aware of the plan and raided the organization. Wang then fled to Sichuan. The following year, Wang Jitai and other sect leaders were caught and executed. Before his death in 1884, Wang Jueyi passed the leadership to Liu Qingxu and he has since become the 16th patriarch to continue the Taoist lineage.

In 1883, he was visited by Lu Zhongyi who would later become his successor. For three years Lu worked as a servant of patriarch Liu. In 1886, patriarch Liu changed the name of the Mohou Yizhu Jiao group to Yiguandao (一貫道). The naming of Yiguandao itself directly refers to a quote from the Analects of Confucius: "The path I follow is the path that unites all" (吾道一以貫之). In 1905, patriarch Liu received revelation from Lao Mu through spirit writing that Lu Zhongyi was appointed to be the next patriarch that time. (Note: There are several versions regarding the year Lu Zhongyi took over the leadership. Based on Yiguandao scripture and some historical documents it's written that Lu took over the leadership and became the 17th patriarch after Lao Mu instruction through spirit writings in 1905. While according to academic books (Jordan, 1985 & Ma, 2011), Lu took over the leadership after Liu had a dream revealed Lu as his successor in 1886. While in some reference (Lu, 2008 & DuBois, 2005), Lu was said to have taken over the leadership after patriarch Liu died in 1919.)

During Liu Qingxu's period, preaching was limited to Shandong, much less than what Wang Jueyi did. Liu Qingxu changed the way the Tao was transmitted by previous patriarchs who only do one-line direct transmission. He also changed the approach of the group he led by no longer opposing the then ruling government like his predecessors and do mass global transmission (大开普度) in Qingzhou as far north as Dezhou, Zhili. It is said that he had around 48,000 followers. Due to Liu Qingxu's background, many of the followers she recruited belonged to the intellectual class, and although her preaching began to shift to the countryside, her teachings were not as widespread and not as large as in Wang Jueyi's time.

== Death ==
Liu died in 1918.

== Source ==
- Billioud, Sébastien (2020), Reclaiming the Wilderness: Contemporary Dynamics of the Yiguandao, Oxford University Press, ISBN 0197529135
- Jordan, David; Daniel Overmyer (1985), The Flying Phoenix: Aspects of Chinese Sectarianism in Taiwan, Princeton University Press, ISBN 069107304X
- DuBois, Thomas David (2005), The Sacred Village: Social Change and Religious Life in Rural North China, University of Hawaii Press, ISBN 0824828372
- Lu, Yunfeng (2008), The Transformation of Yiguan Dao in Taiwan Adapting to a Changing Religious Economy, Lexington Books, ISBN 9780739117194
- Ma, Xisha; Huiying Meng (2011), Popular Religion and Shamanism, Brill, ISBN 978-9004174559
