= Bhuikhel =

Bhuikhel भुइखेल
- Historic site
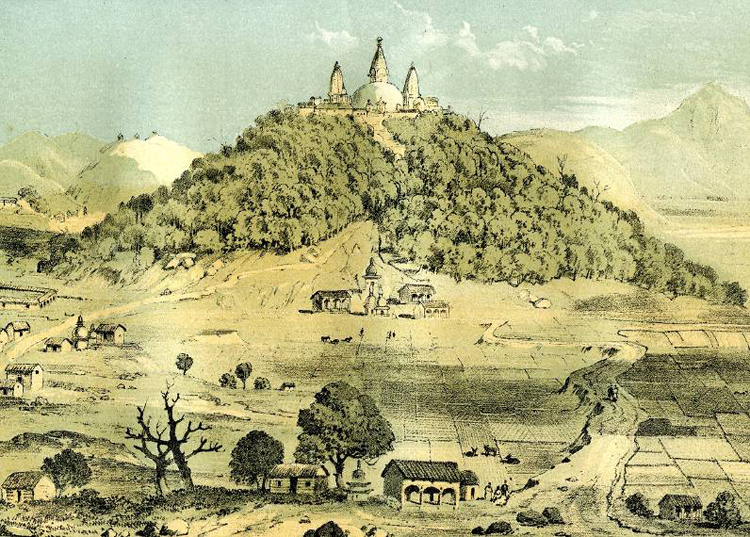
- Sketch of Swayambhu stupa and Bhuikhel plain in Kathmandu, Nepal made by Daniel Wright in 1877
- Interactive map of Bhuikhel
- Coordinates: 27.7102°N 85.2910°E
- Country: Nepal
- Province: Bagmati Province
- District: Kathmandu District
- Municipality: Kathmandu Metropolitan City
- Time zone: UTC+5:45 (Nepal Time)
- Website: www.kathmandu.gov.np

Bhuikhel (Nepali: भुइखेल) is a large plain located in the western part of Kathmandu at the foot of Swayambhu hill. Also known as Bhukhel (भुखेल), it is famed for the Buddhist Samyak festival held here.

The field is one of the city's landmarks and the hallowed venue of Samyak, a spectacular celebration when hundreds of images of Dīpankara Buddha are assembled for an alms-giving ceremony. Bhuikhel's area has shrunk over the years due to construction on its edges.

== Religious significance ==
Bhuikhel is of sacred significance because it is the site of the Samyak ceremony of Kathmandu. This alms-giving festival is held in all the three cities of the Kathmandu Valley at differing intervals. In Bhaktapur, Samyak is celebrated annually, in Patan it occurs every five years, and in Kathmandu it takes place once every 12 years. The most recent one was held in 2005. Samyak celebrates the practice of giving to the Buddhas and monks in the Newar Buddhist tradition.

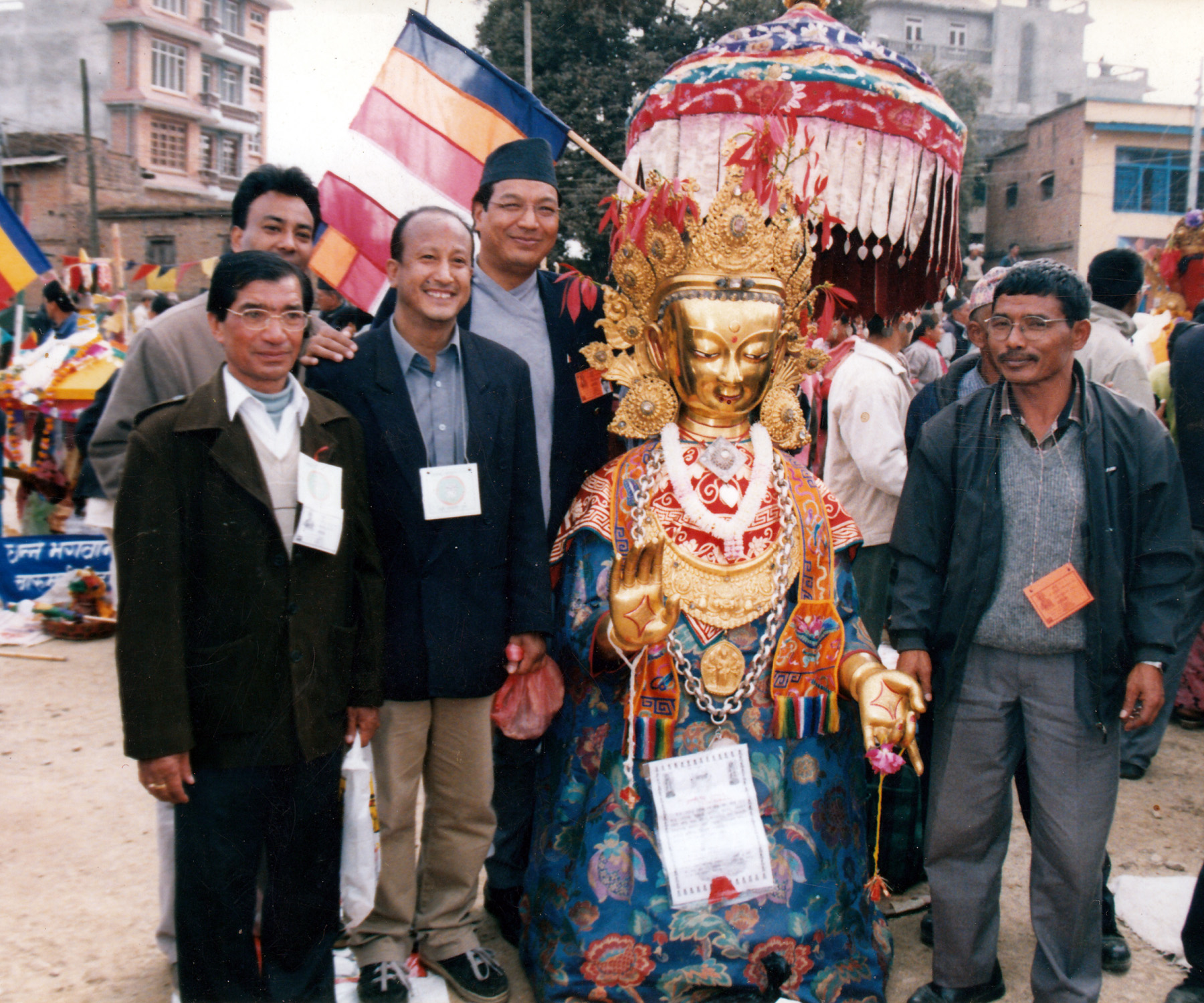
Samyak 2002 at Bhuikhel

The festival in Kathmandu is observed for three days. On the first day, large images of Dipankar Buddha are brought out of sacred courtyards and private homes and displayed in a row at Kathmandu Durbar Square to receive offerings from devotees. On the second day, the statues are carried in procession to Bhuikhel and assembled on the field. During the main ceremony attended by the head of state, priests receive alms consisting of different kinds of sacred foods.

The third day is known as Misā Samyak, which means Women's Samyak. On this day, the image of Goddess Ajimā Dyah is brought down from her shrine at Swayambhu for the ceremony.

== Historical references ==
This was the place where British traveller Colonel William Kirkpatrick set up his camp when he visited Kathmandu in 1793 as the envoy of Charles Cornwallis, the governor-general of British India. Kirkpatrick has written in his account of the visit, "Our camp, during the single week we resided in Nepaul, was pitched on a rising but broken spot of ground, close to the east foot of Sumbhoo-nath, and not quite a mile distance from Khatmanda."
