= Three Suns (eschatology) =

End of time in some Chinese religions

The doctrine of the Three Suns (Chinese: 三阳; pinyin: sānyáng) or three stages of the end-time (Chinese: 三期末劫; pinyin: sānqímòjié), or Three Ages, is a teleological and eschatological doctrine found in some Chinese salvationist religions and schools of Confucianism.

According to the doctrine, the absolute principle, in many salvationist sects represented as the Wusheng Laomu, divides the end time into three stages, each of which is governed by a different Buddha sent by the Mother to save humanity: the "Green Sun" (qingyang) governed by Dīpankara Buddha, the "Red Sun" (hongyang) by Gautama Buddha, and the current "White Sun" (baiyang) by Maitreya. In different sects the three periods are known by slightly different names, variations originated by oral transmission of the teaching. The doctrine is especially important in the Xiantiandao group of sects, the most notable one being Yiguandao.

== Origins ==
The belief in Maitreya arose and has spread throughout China thanks to the translation of Buddhist scriptures from India starting in the 2nd century. During the Northern and Southern Dynasties (420–589), a large number of Maitreyan “pseudoscriptures” emerged. The messianic idea of “Three Buddhas answering Three Ages” (三佛应劫) was compiled based on these pseudo-scriptures. The messianic idea divides human history into 3 ages: the Blue Sun Epoch (Qingyang jie 青阳劫), the Red Sun Epoch (Hongyang jie 红阳劫 or 红羨劫), and the White Sun Epoch (Baiyang jie 白阳劫). The catastrophic occurrence at the end of each great kalpa that will happen millions of years in the future in Buddhist scriptures is interpreted in the context of the millenarianism of popular sects to be something that will happen in the near future. The emergence of many figures claiming to be Maitreya created a new belief in societies that Maitreya Buddha had been born into the world. The emergence of the Maitreya teachings has given some idea of the idea of the division of time, with the time of Sakyamuni Buddha considered as the past and the time of Maitreya Buddha as the new one. The main doctrine of the Mahayana Maitreya sect (彌勒大乘教) at that time was the salvation theory of Maitreya Buddha, and it was this sect that popularized the idea of “Three Buddhas answering the three ages” and “New Buddha coming to the world to eliminate the old demons”.

Evidence of the concept of the three ages theory is found in the Yunji Qiqian (雲笈七籤), a text written in the early 11th century by Zhang Junfang (張君房 ) for his emperor. The content of the text is about the three periods ruled by the Green Sun Emperor (日中青蒂), the Red Sun Emperor (日中紅蒂), and the White Sun Emperor (日中白帝).

The Three Suns doctrine places itself in a sect tradition ("Sanyangism", 三阳教 Sānyángjiào, "teaching of the Three Suns") flourishing at least since the Ming dynasty. It can be traced back to a Taoist school named Hunyuan, from the concept of hunyuan ("original chaos") that existed before hundun ("still chaos") and is the beginning of primordial qi (yuanqi) according to some Taoist cosmologies. Other possible origins go back to the entry of Maitreya beliefs into China. These concepts became part of the folk tradition and were incorporated in the sect milieu.

In the earliest sects of the Ming period, the Lord of Original Chaos (Hunyuan Zhu) represents the origin of the universe developing through three stages, yang, or cosmic periods. The earliest written evidence of this doctrine can be found in the Huangji jieguo baojuan (皇极结果宝卷), published in 1430. In this text the three stages are already associated to the three Buddhas: Dipankara, Gautama and Maitreya. The Green Sun Assembly was held at the end of the first period, the Red Sun Assembly in the second one and the White Sun Assembly will be held in the third one.

The three sun period theory is also found “The Treasure Scroll of the Emperor's Supreme Golden Elixir, the Nine Lotuses and the Correct Belief in the Truth, and the Return to Heaven” (皇極金丹九蓮正信歸真還鄉寶卷), a scripture that was used by Green Lotus sect (青蓮教) as the basis of the sect's doctrine. It is the theoretical basis of this book that later became the basis of the religions that stemmed from this sect, one of the most famous of which is Yiguandao.

The three stages of end-time are also contained in the book “A Complete Guide to Answering the Three Buddha Periods” (三教應劫總觀通書). This book was used by the White Lotus sect Rebellion in the late 18th century and was again used as the main doctrine by the religious sect Tianli sect (天理教) who carried out the Eight Trigrams Rebellion (八卦教).

== Confucian doctrine ==
The doctrine of the Three Ages is discussed in Neo-Confucian and New Confucian teachings, the Gongyang Commentary and the Datong shu of Kang Youwei. The Confucian interpretation is comparable to the doctrine of the Spirit in Hegelian thought. Ren ("humaneness", the essence of human being) develops and matures progressively to higher stages in history.

Kang saw history as progressing from an Age of Disorder to the Age of Approaching Peace, and ending at the Age of Universal Peace. In the third age humankind attains Datong, ren is fully realised as people transcend their selfishness and become one with "all under Heaven".

== Yiguandao doctrine ==
Currently, Yiguandao doctrine about Three Ages is as follows:

| Period | Duration (years) | Governing Buddhas | True Sutras | Hand Seals | Numbers of Disasters | Target Audience | Handler(s) of the Tao | Assemblies | Number of Enlightened Souls |
| Green Sun | 1886 (3,086-1,200 BC) | Dīpankara | Wú Liàng Shòu Fó (無量壽佛) | Single-handed (Lotus Leaf) gesture | 9 | Ruling class | Fuxi | Cherry Assembly (櫻桃會) | 200 million |
| Red Sun | 3,114 (1,200 BC - 1912 AD) | Shakyamuni | Namo Amitābha (南無阿彌陀佛) | Lotus Flower gesture | 18 | Intelligentsia | King Wu of Zhou, Jiang Ziya, Duke of Shao, and Shi Yi | Peach Assembly (蟠桃會) | 200 million |
| White Sun | 10,800 (1912–present) | Maitreya | Wú Tài Fó Mí Lè (無太佛彌勒) | Lotus root (Zi-Hai(子亥, lit. Child)) gesture | 81 | Commoners | Ji Gong | Nagapushpa Assembly (龍華會) | 9.6 billion |

== See also ==
- Chinese salvationist religions
- Eschatology
- Xiantiandao
- Joachim of Fiore
- Five Suns

== Sources ==
- Seiwert, Hubert Michael (2003), Popular Religious Movements and Heterodox Sects in Chinese History, Brill, ISBN 9004131469
- Tay, Wei Leong (2010), Kang Youwei: The Martin Luther of Confucianism and His Vision of Confucian Modernity and Nation (PDF)
- Ma, Xisha; Huiying, Meng (2011), Popular Religion and Shamanism, BRILL, ISBN 978-9004174559
- Jordan, David; Daniel Overmyer (1985), The Flying Phoenix: Aspects of Chinese Sectarianism in Taiwan, Princeton University Press, ISBN 069107304X
- 馬, 國棟 (1996), 天道五教(一贯道)的真相讲义, 香港基督徒短期宣教訓練中心
