= Yao Hetian =

14th Patriarch of Yiguandao

- 姚鶴天

Personal life
- Born: Taiyuan, Shanxi, Qing Dynasty
- Died: 1874
- Known for: 14th Yiguandao Patriarch
- Other names: Yang Mingchi

Religious life
- Religion: Xiantiandao
- Sect: Xiantiandao

Senior posting
- Predecessor: Xu Haiwu; Yang Haixu
- Successor: Wang Jueyi
- Reincarnation: Yao Chi Jin Mu

Yao Hetian (Chinese: 姚鶴天; pinyin: Yáohètiān) or Yang Mingchi (Chinese: 姚明池; pinyin: Yáomíng chí) is regarded as the 14th Patriarch by Yiguandao and became the first patriarch to be exclusively in their patriarchal lineage. It is from Yao Hetian that the patriarchal lineage between Xiantiandao and Yiguandao diverges.

== Early life ==
He was born in during the Qing Dynasty and was originally from Taiyuan, Shanxi. According to the Yiguandao scriptures, he is believed to be an incarnation of Yaochi Jinmu.

== Religious leadership ==
During the Tongzhi period, religious rebellions such as the Green Lotus Sect, Taiping Heavenly Kingdom, and Nian Rebellion were suppressed by the Qing government. However, the conflicts in society did not subside but became more acute and complex. Due to the turbulent hearts of the people, religious sects had the opportunity to flourish. The Green Lotus sect was once again divided. The 15th Patriarch of Xiantiandao, whose name was Lin Yimi (林依秘) / Li Zhuguan (林祝官) established the Western Hall of Heaven (西乾堂) as a shelter for the members of the Green Lotus sect.

In 1873, Yao Hetian was appointed as the superintendent of the Western Heaven Hall. Yao Hetian became one of the preachers there, and later claimed that he had been given the Mandate of Heaven and founded a new sect. After Yao Hetian took over the leadership, he made some reforms to the teachings, such as for example the main veneration originally aimed at Yaochi Jinmu, reverted to veneration of Wusheng Laomu as it was during the Great Vehicle sect (大乘教). According to the record of the Origin of Elders in Every Generation (歷代祖師源流道脈) it is said that Wang Jueyi was a disciple of elder Yao of the Hall of Western Heaven.

== Death ==
Yao died in 1874.

== Source ==
- Lu, Yunfeng (2008), The Transformation of Yiguan Dao in Taiwan Adapting to a Changing Religious Economy, Lexington Books, ISBN 9780739117194
- Ma, Xisha; Huiying Meng (2011), Popular Religion and Shamanism, Brill, ISBN 978-9004174559
