= Faqing =

Chinese Buddhist monk (died c. 515)

Faqing (Chinese: 法慶; pinyin: Fǎ qìng) also known as Shi Faqing (释法庆) was a monk living during the Northern Wei Dynasty, who was the founder of the Mahayana Maitreya Sect (彌勒大乘教) that formed an army to fight against the Northern Wei Dynasty, slaughtering many peoples, known as the Faqing Rebellion (法慶之亂).

== Life ==
=== The massacre ===
Fa Qing lived in the Northern Wei dynasty. He was a monk who did not follow the monastic rules of Buddhism and had a wife named Huihui (惠暉). Fa Qing proclaimed himself as the “new Buddha”, and founded the “Mahayana sect” (大乘教), that also known as Mahayana Maitreya Sect (彌勒大乘教). The so-called “new Buddha” was to quote Buddhist scriptures that “Maitreya descended to become a Buddha”, and “Maitreya Buddha replaced Shakyamuni Buddha to save the world”. Fa Qing revised the doctrines of the Wisdom Perfection School in Mahayana Buddhism.

At that time the śramaṇa Faqing from Jizhou started to propagate strange and illusive things. He attracted Li Guibo (李歸伯) from Bohai who followed him with his whole family and furthermore brought the people from his home region. Thus, [Li Guibo] supported Faqing as leader. Faqing [in return] declared Guibo to be a bodhisattva of the tenth stage (shizhu pusa 十住菩薩), appointed him as "Demon Pacifying General" (pingmo junsi 平摩軍司) and "King who Establishes the Han" (dinghan wang 定漢王). Himself he called Dacheng (大乘) (Great Vehicle, Mahāyāna).

[Faqing taught his followers] that one who has killed one man will be a bodhisattva of the first stage, while killing ten men will make him a bodhisattva of the tenth stage. He also mixed narcotic drugs and ordered his followers to take them. [As a result the minds of his followers became disturbed such that] fathers, sons, and brothers did not recognize each other and had nothing in mind but killing.

— Book of Wei (c. 554)

=== Rebellion and death ===
In June of 515, Fa Qing, with the support of Li Guibo, gathered an army in Jizhou (present-day Hebei) to rebel against the rule of the Northern Wei Dynasty in the name of Buddhism. The number of his followers at that time reached more than 50,000.

Thus, his crowd killed the magistrate of Fucheng, devastated the district of Bohai and killed the officials. When the regional inspector Xiao Baoyin (蕭寶夤) and the administrator Cui Bolin (崔伯麟) made a punitive expedition and arrived on the scene, they were defeated at Zhuzao where [Cui] Bolin fell in the battle. Thereupon the evil hordes became even stronger. Everywhere they slaughtered and destroyed monasteries and cloisters. They butchered the monks and nuns, and burned the sacred scriptures and images declaring: "The new Buddha has appeared who will eradicate the old demons."

To subdue this rebellion [Yuan] Yao (元遙) was given full powers as commander of the northern expedition. He led an army of hundred thousand men infantry and cavalry. Faqing attacked the forces of Yao, but Yao smashed him. Then Yao charged general Zhang Qiu (張虯) and others to pursue him with the cavalry and to destroy the rebels. They caught Faqing and his wife, the nun Huihui, and others and decapitated them. Their heads were sent to the capital. Later Guibo was equally caught and killed in the capital.

— Book of Wei (c. 554)

== Sources ==
- Ma, Xisha; Huiying Meng (2011), Popular Religion and Shamanism, Brill, ISBN 978-9004174559
- Seiwert, Hubert Michael (2003), Popular Religious Movements and Heterodox Sects in Chinese History, Brill, ISBN 9004131469
- Zhuo, Xinping, Dong Zhao (2019), Religious Faith of the Chinese, Springer, ISBN 9789811348679
