= Samyak =

Important Newar Buddhist festival in Nepal

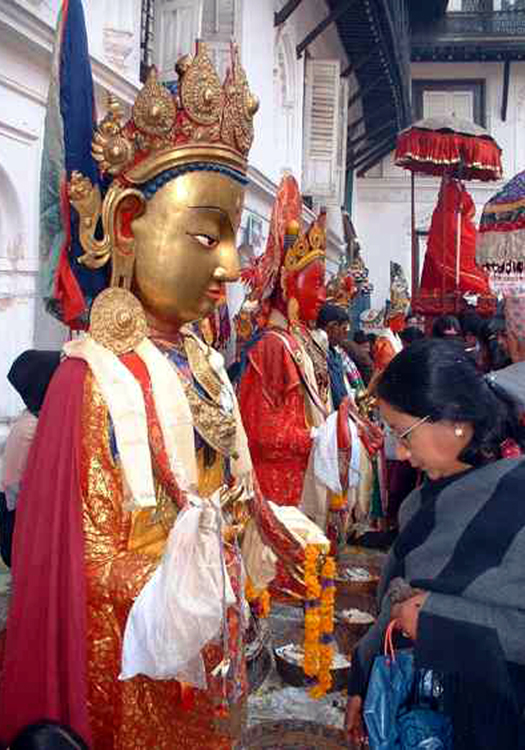
Images of Dipankar Buddha at Kathmandu Durbar Square during Samyak

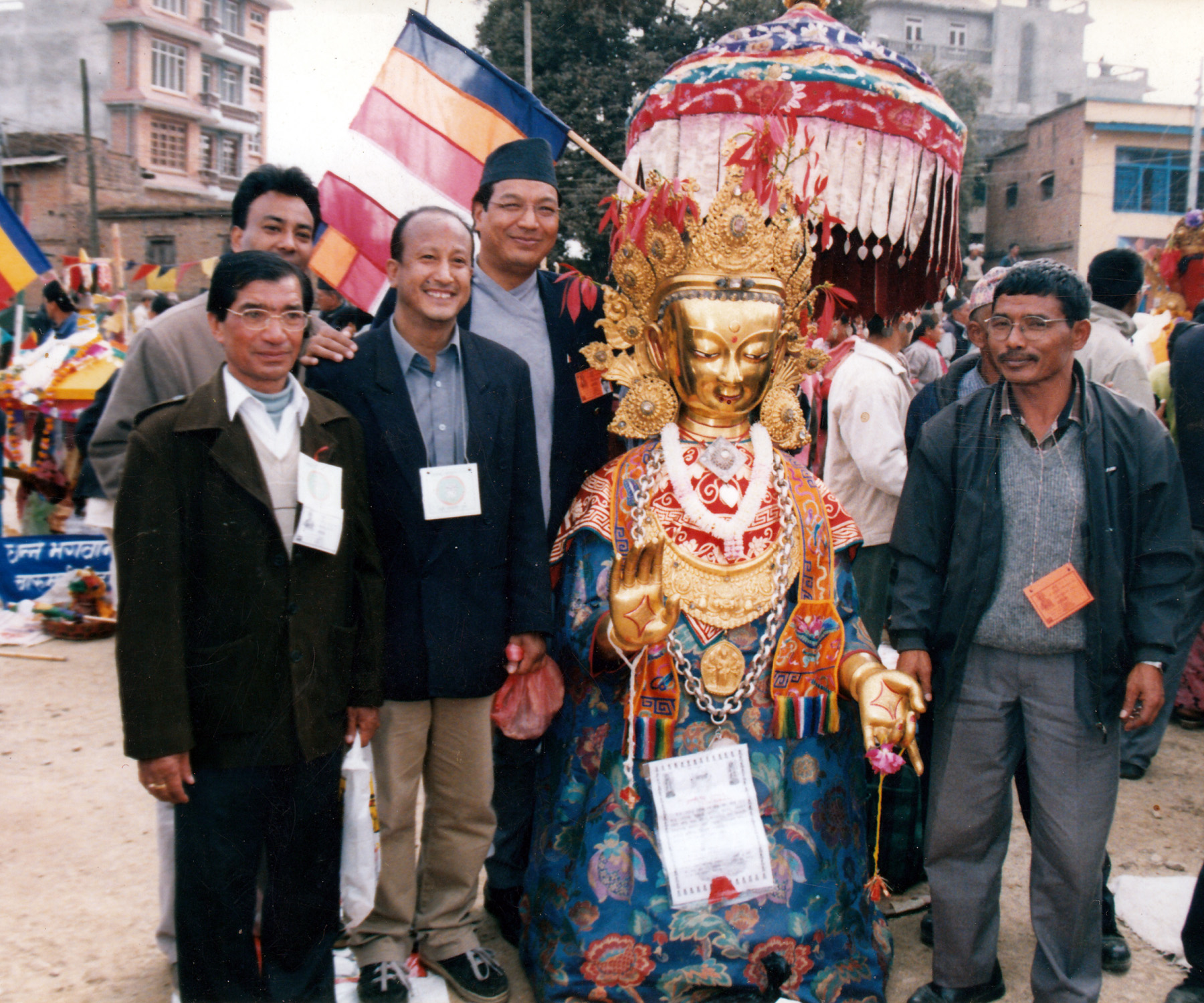
Samyak 2002 at Bhuikhel

Samyak (Nepali: सम्यक) is an almsgiving Buddhist festival celebrated in the Kathmandu Valley in Nepal. During the ceremony which is held on a large open ground, hundreds of Dīpankara Buddha images are assembled, and gifts of different types of food are made to the Buddha images and the Buddhist community.

Samyak is the most spectacular Newar Buddhist celebration. It is observed at different intervals in the three cities of the valley -- every 12 years in Kathmandu, every five years in Lalitpur and annually in Bhaktapur. The first documented Samyak festival in Kathmandu took place in 1015 AD (135 Nepal Era).

The festival brings together a wide cross-section of Newar society, including priests, artisans, traders, musicians and farmers. Each group has a defined role designed to highlight social harmony. The ceremony celebrates the practice of giving to the Buddhas and monks in the Newar Buddhist tradition. The Samyak festival in Kathmandu is held at Kathmandu Durbar Square and the field of Bhuikhel at the foot of Swayambhu hill.

== Day One ==
On the first day, large images of Dipankar Buddha are brought out of sacred courtyards and private homes and displayed at Durbar Square in a row to receive offerings from devotees.

== Day Two ==
On the second day, the statues are carried in procession to Bhuikhel and assembled on the field. Priests receive alms consisting of different kinds of sacred foods in a ceremony held in the presence of the king.

The offerings are made by members of the Uray caste group. Each subgroup performs a task that has been assigned by tradition.

- Tuladhars of Asan sew and distribute leaf plates
- Tuladhars of Nyata cook and serve rice
- Sthapits build the wooden viewing stand
- Tamrakars play the trumpet
- Kansakars prepare and serve five types of foods
- Sikhrakars supply clay pots
- Banias serve a sweet drink
- Selaliks serve confections

== Misā Samyak ==
Misā Samyak, which means Women's Samyak, is held on the third day. The image of Goddess Ajimā Dyah is brought down from her shrine at Swayambhu for the ceremony.

== Timetable ==
The regular Samyak ceremony is held at intervals of 12 years. However, a special one can be called between the scheduled occurrences by a sponsor. The most recent one took place in 2005.

In Lalitpur, the Samyak festival is held at Nagbahal every five years. The latest one occurred in 2020.

In Bhaktapur, Samyak is celebrated annually on the feast day of Ghyah Chāku Sanlhu (Maghe Sankranti) which usually falls on January 15.
