= Wang Hao-te =

- Chinese: 王好德
Transcriptions
Standard Mandarin
- Hanyu Pinyin: Wáng Hǎodé
- Wade–Giles: Wang Hao-te

Courtesy name
- Chinese: 高山
Transcriptions
Standard Mandarin
- Hanyu Pinyin: gāoshān

Pseudonym
- Chinese: 高山愚人
Transcriptions
Standard Mandarin
- Hanyu Pinyin: gāoshān yúrén

Wang Hao-te, also known as Wang Hao Demir, was the founder of the Great Way of Maitreya (Chinese: 彌勒大道; pinyin: Mílè Dà Dào). Wang was born on August 31, 1921, in a small village called Zhang Gu in Shandong. He went to Taiwan when he was 17 years old during the Second World War, and he was introduced to Yiguandao in 1948. He was the only person appointed to take care of Sun Su Zhen, or "Shi Mu" (Chinese: 師母), the great mistress of Yiguandao, for 11 years until her death on April 4, 1975. Wang died of CO_{2} poisoning on December 25, 1999, during his mission to Chiang Mai.

In 1987, Wang set up the Providence Maitreya Buddha Institute (Chinese: 天恩彌勒佛院; pinyin: Tiān'ēn Mílè Fó Yuàn) in Hsinchu, Taiwan. According to a survey done in 2004, this religion has 1,000,000 members and 2,000 temples all over the world.

== See also ==
- Yiguandao
- Zhang Tian Ran
- Sun Su Zhen

== Sources ==
- Clart, Philip. 2000. Opening the Wilderness for the Way of Heaven: A Chinese New Religion in the Greater Vancouver Area. Journal of Chinese Religions 28: 127–144
- Soo, Khin Wah. 1997. A Study of the Yiguan Dao (Unity Sect) and its Development in Peninsular Malaysia. Ph.D. dissertation, University of British Columbia.
- 台灣地區宗教簡介: 彌勒大道 Introduction to religions in the Taiwan territory: Maitreya Great Tao, Department of Civil Affairs, Ministry of Interior, Republic of China. 2001. Accessed February 7, 2006.
