= Wang Jueyi =

Chinese religious leader (1821–1884)

- 王覺一
- Title: 15th Taoist Patriarch (Yiguandao)

Personal life
- Born: Wang Ximeng; 1833 Qingzhou, Qing dynasty
- Died: 1884 (aged 51)
- Other names: Wang Yanghao; Beihai Laoren

Religious life
- Religion: Yiguandao
- Sect: Mohou Yizhaojiao

Senior posting
- Period in office: 1877 – 1884
- Predecessor: Yao Hetian
- Successor: Liu Qingxu

Chinese name
- Traditional Chinese: 王覺一
- Simplified Chinese: 王觉一
Transcriptions
Standard Mandarin
- Hanyu Pinyin: Wáng Juéyī
- Wade–Giles: Wang Chüeh I

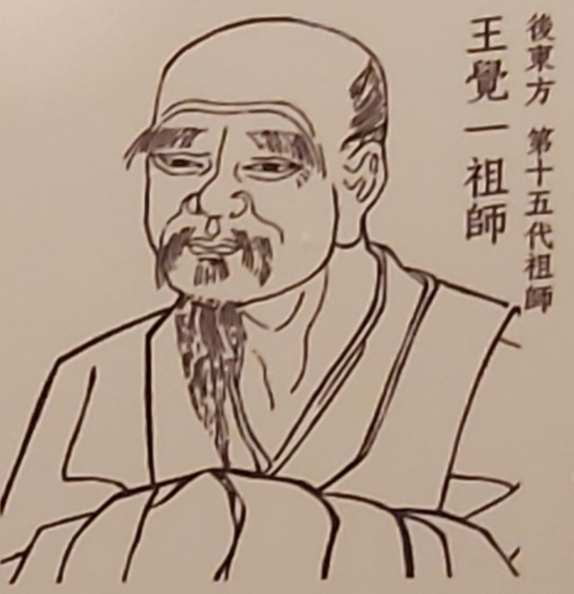
Wang Jeuyi drawing

Wang Jueyi (Chinese: 王覺一; 1821–1884), or Wang Yanghao (王养浩), born Wang Ximeng (王希孟) or also referred to as Beihai Laoren (北海老人) was the founder of the sect “Religion for Final Salvation” / Mohou Yizhaojiao (末后一着教) which later changed its name to Yiguandao "Unity Sect" and claimed the 15th Taoist patriarchate (道統)

== Early life ==
Wang Jueyi was born Wang Ximeng in 1833 (Note: According to some reference books, Wang Jueyi's birth year was 1821. The birth year in those books are based on Lin Wanchuan's (林万传) “Studies on Xiantiandao” (先天道研究) which turned out to be a speculation. The latest evidence from the appendix of the arrest warrant issued by the Governor of Henan states that Wang Jueyi was 52 years old (lunar calendar age) when he hid from the government in 1884. There is also other evidence from Wang Jueyi's son's confession when he was arrested that confirms this. Therefore, the correct year of birth should be 1833.) in Qingzhou, Yidu province under the Qing dynasty. On account of his orphanhood in very young age, Wang was brought up in his uncle's family. When he was thirteen years old, he went to Liufu to herd cattle. He had studied Taoism, Confucianism and Buddhism. At the age of 17, Wang was initiated by the 14th patriarch Yao Hetian in Taiyuan, Shanxi. At the age of 27, he followed the Yao patriarch to spread the teachings. Xiantiandao, the Yao patriarch's group at the time was in a state of turmoil and was being divided due to oppression and suppression by the Qing government. Wang worked as a fortune teller in his home. At the age of over 40, he saw the shape of an Ancient Buddhist letter (古佛) in the palm of his hand, and claimed to be an emanation of Ancient Buddha. Wang eventually founded his own group which was officially established in 1877.

== Founding of Yiguandao ==
In 1877, according to Yiguandao's account, Lao Mu through spirit writing passed him the Mandate of Heaven and appointed Wang Jueyi as the 15th patriarch of Taoism (with Zen Patriarch Bodhidharma as the first such patriarch) of Dongzhentang (東震堂). Dongzhentang was the new name given at the direction of the revelation replacing the previous name of the Western Hall of Heaven (西乾堂) and Wang was appointed as its leader. From then on, Wang Jueyi changed the name of the group he led to Mohou Yizhaojiao (末后一着教) which a few years later was changed by Liu Qingxu as Wang's successor to Yiguandao." (Note: According to Wang Jueyi's son Wang Jitai, the sect was originally to be named Xiantian Wusheng Jiao (先天无生教), but was later changed to Moho Yizhao Jiao.) Due to his important contributions, Wang is considered the true founder of modern Yiguandao by some historians.

The Xiantian Dao sect under Wang's leadership was significantly confucianized. He introduced the concept of the Path of Li Tian/Eternal Heaven (理天法) which is higher than the Path of Qi Tian/Eve Realm (氣天法) while removing the requirements of “being vegetarian” (茹素) and “observing abstinence” (絕慾) to join his sect. Wang wrote books such as Explanation of the Great Teachings (大学解), Explanation of the Doctrine of the Mean (中庸解), Study of the Three Changes (三易探原), Study of the Unity One (一贯探原), Explanation for Eliminating Doubts (理性释疑) and many other books that later served as the sect's doctrinal guidelines, while Taoist practices such as meditation and medicine were abolished. Wang changed the initiation method from pointing out of the adherent mysterious door (玄關) to pointing on the adherent's mysterious door. He also abolished the jiujie neigong (九节内功) tradition created by the 9th patriarch Huang Dehui.

Under Wang's leadership, the Mohou Yizhaojiao sect managed to become a countrywide sect within a few years. Wang had special disciples, Zhang Daofu (張道符) and Liu Zhigang (劉至剛). Zhang Daofu, also known as Zhang Xiangru (張相如), led missionary affairs in Haizhou, Shuyang, Andong, and Taoyuan. While Liu Zhigang became the leader in Hankou.

The sect had been rapidly spread throughout the country until the Qing governmental crackdown against it in 1883. Many followers of Wang, including his son, were killed during this situation.

== Rebellion ==
In 1883, Wang Jueyi planned a rebellion to be carried out on the 8th of the 3rd month simultaneously in several cities. The plan was discovered by the Qing government and immediately arrested the leaders of the Mohou Yizhao Jiao group. The planned rebellion in Jiangshu was also crushed before it even began. Wang and his son Wang Jitai (王继泰) fled to Hankou. They discussed with Liu Zhigang (who later became the 16th patriarch of I Kuan Tao) and planned to start a night attack on the 28th of the 3rd month simultaneously in Wuchang and Hankou. Liu was asked to gather followers and prepare weapons for the uprising. Unexpectedly, the authorities in Wuchang seemed to be aware of the plan and arrested Wan Daqi who was one of the leaders along with about 30 other people. The arrest hit Wang hard. Wang then fled to Sichuan. In the following year, Wang Jitai and other sect leaders were caught and executed. From then on, Wang Jueyi was forced to live in hiding until his death, at which point the sect he founded also decline.

== Later life and death ==
Wang Jueyi died in Tianjin in the third month of 1884. His son Wang Jitai was also executed by the government that year. After Mohou Yizhaojiao was destroyed, besides the group led by Liu Qingxu, there were other groups that survived. The group in Henan was still active in the early 20th century, despite having suffered heavy losses at the beginning of the seventh year of Guangxu's reign (1881). The group later changed its name to the Amitabha Sect (彌陀教) also known as the Dragon Flower Community (龍華會) in 1899 and later participated in the Yihetuan movement that wanted to overthrow the Qing dynasty and root out foreigners.

== See also ==
- Luo Teaching
- Xiantiandao
- Yiguandao

== Sources ==
- Lu, Yunfeng (2008), The Transformation of Yiguan Dao in Taiwan Adapting to a Changing Religious Economy, Lexington Books, ISBN 9780739117194
- Ma, Xisha; Huiying Meng (2011), Popular Religion and Shamanism, Brill, ISBN 978-9004174559
- Soo, Khin Wah (1997), A study of the Yiguan Dao (Unity Sect) and its development in Peninsular Malaysia, University of British Columbia, doi:10.14288/1.0088243
- Seiwert, Hubert Michael (2003), Popular Religious Movements and Heterodox Sects in Chinese History, Brill, ISBN 9004131469
