= Sun Suzhen =

Chinese religious leader (1895–1975)

Venerable Teacher Bodhisattva Sun Suzhen 師母
- 孫素真
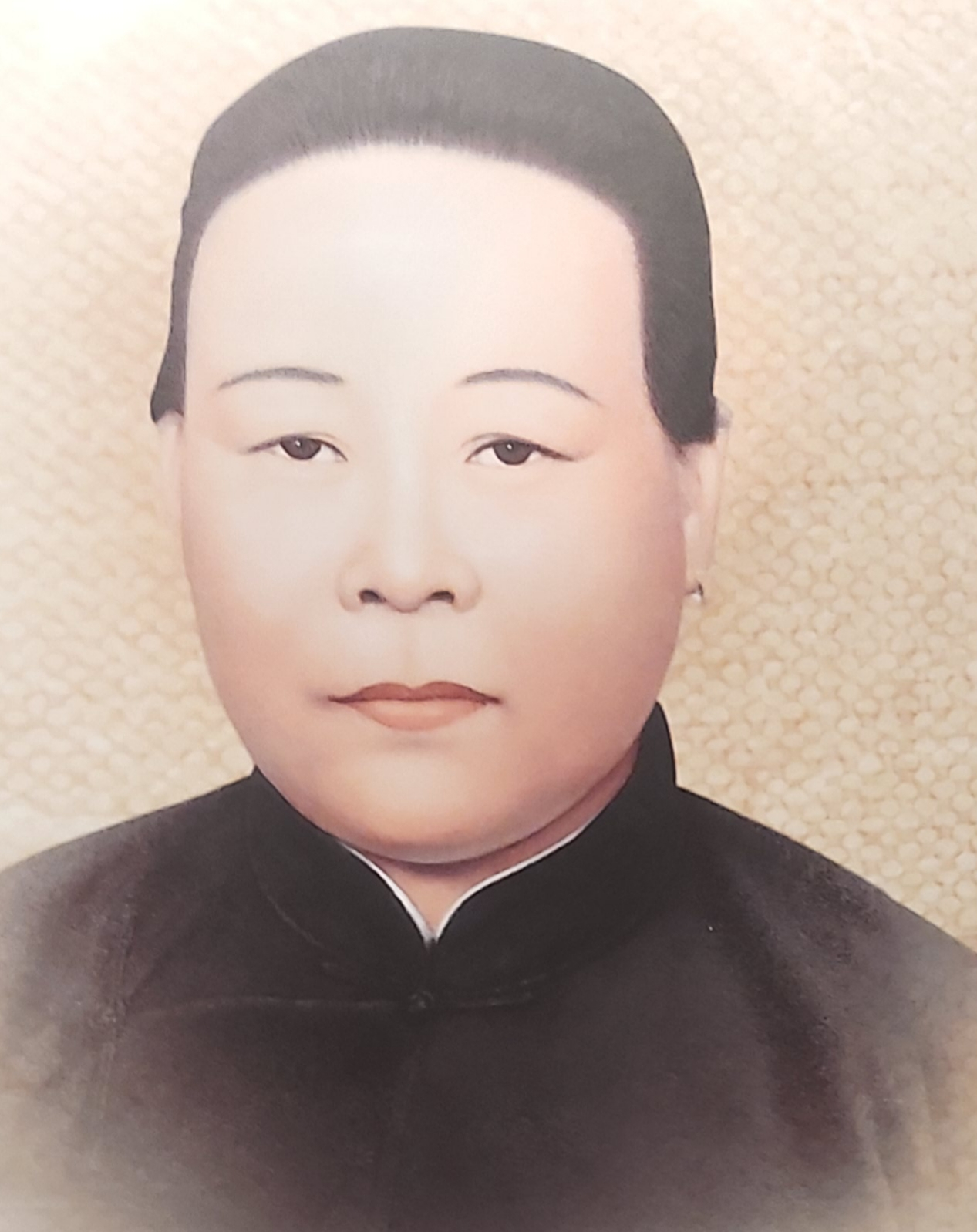
- Title: 18th Taoist Matriarch (Yiguandao, disputed)

Personal life
- Born: 16 October 1895 Shan County, Qing dynasty
- Died: 4 April 1975 (aged 79) Taichung, Taiwan
- Resting place: Taoyuan, Taiwan
- Partner: Zhang Tianran
- Children: 12
- Other names: Ming Shan (明善); Hui Ming (慧明)
- Posthumous name: Holy Mother of the Chinese (中華聖母)

Religious life
- Religion: Taoism
- Sect: Yiguandao

Senior posting
- Period in office: 1930 – 1975 (alongside Zhang Tianran until 1947) (disputed)
- Predecessor: Lu Zhongyi; Zhang Tianran
- Reincarnation: Yuehui Bodhisattva

Chinese name
- Traditional Chinese: 孫素真
- Simplified Chinese: 孙素真
Transcriptions
Standard Mandarin
- Hanyu Pinyin: Sūn Sùzhēn
- Wade–Giles: Sun Su Chen

Sun Suzhen (Chinese: 孫素真; 16 October 1895 – 4 April 1975) was the 18th matriarch of Yiguandao. She was the successor of Zhang Tianran.

== Early life ==
Sun Suzhen was born in Shan County, Shandong on the 28th day of the eighth lunar month in 1895. She was introduced to Yiguandao in 1908 and became a student of Lu Zhongyi. She was regarded by Yiguandao's followers as the incarnation of the Yuehui "Moon Wisdom" Bodhisattva, the counterpart of Ji Gong. She became the 18th matriarch of Yiguandao, together with Zhang Tianran (the reincarnation of Ji Gong), in 1930.

== Yiguandao leadership ==
After the death of Zhang in 1947, she took control of Yiguandao. Many of Zhang's followers followed her leadership. Only a small fraction stayed on with Madame Liu.

When the communists took over China in 1949, Sun moved to Hong Kong. She then went to Kuala Lumpur, Malaysia for a short period (1951–52) then returned to Hong Kong.

In Hong Kong, she was said to have left behind a large number of "heavenly mandates" (天命). To this day, there are a few elders in Hong Kong who are believed to be the keepers of these heavenly mandates.

== Later life and death ==
In 1954, she moved to Taiwan. Because Yiguandao was illegal in both mainland China and Taiwan and was categorized as a cult by both authorities, she kept a low profile and was kept under seclusion. She was sick in her last years and under the care of a nun surnamed Zhou in Taichung. Later she was under the care of Wang Hao De until her death. She died on the 23rd day of the second lunar month in 1975 (4 April 1975), one day before the death of Chiang Kai-shek.

The location of her gravesite is unknown, but it is likely that she was buried in an unmarked grave in Daxi, Taoyuan. She was given the title Zhonghua Shengmu (中華聖母) (Holy Mother of the Chinese) by her followers.
