= Zhang Tianran =

Chinese religious leader (1889–1947)

Venerable Teacher Zhang Tianran 師尊
- 張天然
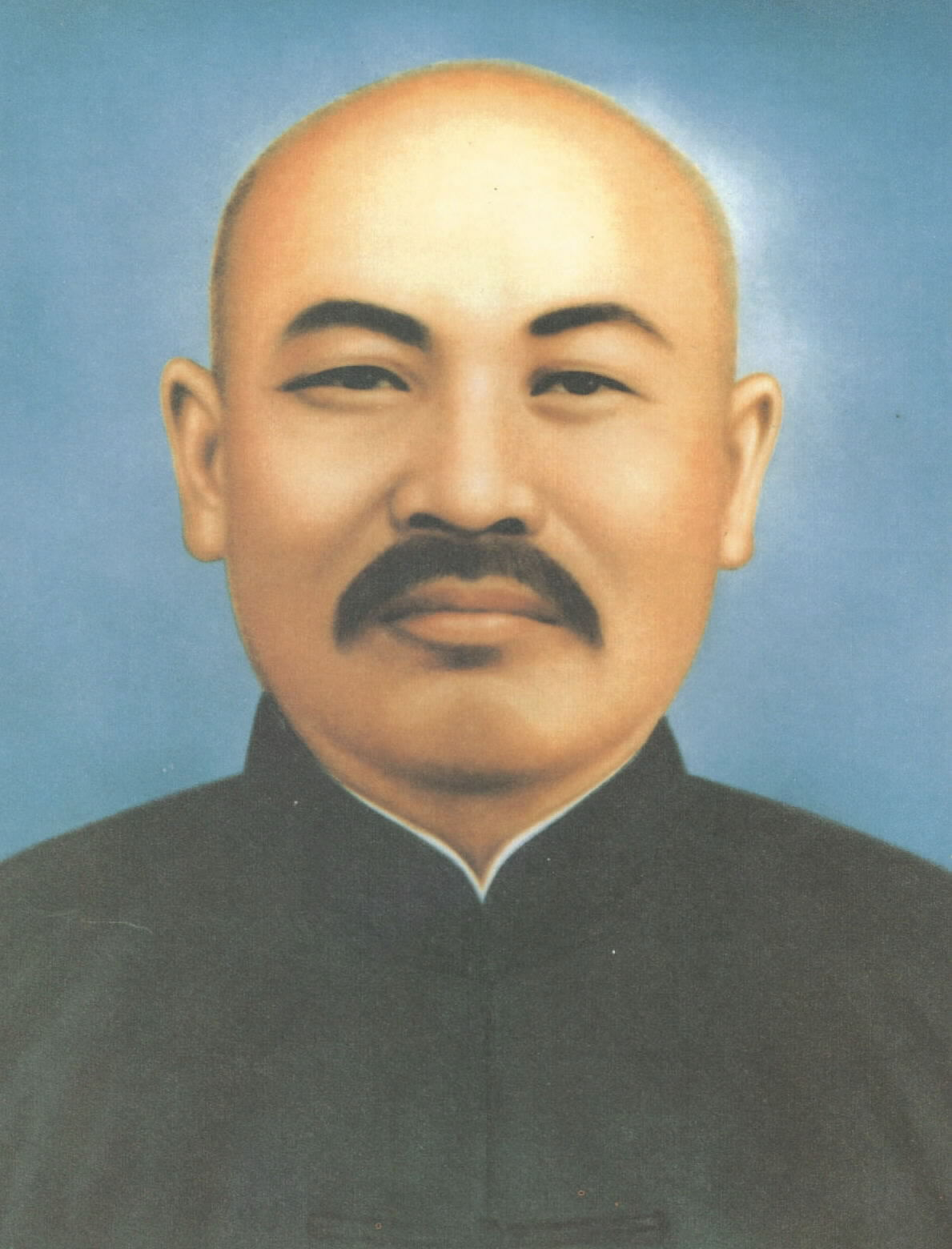
- Title: 18th Taoist Patriarch (Yiguandao)

Personal life
- Born: Kui Sheng; 8 August 1889 Jining, Qing dynasty
- Died: 29 September 1947 (aged 58) Chengdu, Republic of China
- Resting place: Nanping Hill, Hangzhou
- Partner: Zhu Shuzhen (m. 1906; died 1907) Liu Lǜzhen (m. 1908) Sun Suzhen (m. 1930)
- Children: 12, including: Zhang Ruizhen; Zhang Maomeng; Zhang Maotian; Zhang Maoming
- Posthumous name: Ancient Buddha Tianran (天然古佛)

Religious life
- Religion: Taoism
- Sect: Yiguandao

Senior posting
- Teacher: Lu Zhongyi
- Period in office: 1930 – 1947
- Predecessor: Lu Zhongyi
- Successor: Sun Suzhen (disputed by Tiandao association)
- Reincarnation: Ji Gong

Chinese name
- Traditional Chinese: 張天然
- Simplified Chinese: 张天然
Transcriptions
Standard Mandarin
- Hanyu Pinyin: Zhāng Tiānrán
- Wade–Giles: Chang T'ien Jan

Zhang Tianran (Chinese: 張天然; 8 August 1889 – 29 September 1947), born Kui Sheng (Chinese: 奎生), was the eighteenth patriarch of the Yiguandao religious sect. He is usually referred to as the Father of Yiguandao, or as Shi Zun (師尊), meaning the Honored Teacher.

== Early life ==
Zhang Tianran (the religious name he would later be known for) was born under the name Kui Sheng, and also as Zhang Guangbi (張光壁). He was also known as Kung Chang (弓長; Kung and Chang are the two readings of the character Zhang). Zhang was born on the 19th day of the 7th lunar month in 1889, in Jining, a city in the northern Shandong province.

He left home and traveled to Nanjing and Shanghai. At age 24, Zhang joined the army as a low ranking military officer. Zhang was then initiated into Yiguandao in 1914. The 17th patriarch, Lu Zhongyi, heard the conduct of Zhang and told him to join the organisation in Jining. Lu died in 1925, and was succeeded by his sister, Lu Zhongjie who temporarily looked after the Yiguandao for six years. In 1930, Zhang Tianran became the 18th patriarch, alongside Sun Suzhen.

== Yiguandao leadership ==
There are various accounts concerning the transfer of the 18th patriarch and the meeting of Zhang Tianran with Sun Suzhen. The most simple account states that the Venerable Mother transferred the 18th patriarchs to both Zhang and Sun, which was disputed and not recognised by followers of Zhang's son, Zhang Yingyu, citing the spirit writing done . The most widely accepted version in Western literature states that Zhang took Sun Suzhen as his second wife in 1930. She was already a member of Yiguandao and it was believed that Zhang married her after a "divine message". The Eastern account, however, states that both parties initially rejected the marriage, since it was inappropriate at the time for an unmarried woman and a man to be seen traveling around alone together apart from the fact that Zhang had already married, which they often did to carry forth their mission. The duo plead to the Venerable Mother but the Venerable Mother rejected their appeals by sending calamities at the surrounding area, which left them no choice but to marry. Hence, their "marriage" was to quell rumours and societal taboos. In truth, they were never married.

Zhang was considered as the incarnation of Ji Gong, a Buddhist monk who was revered as an incarnation of an Arhat by Buddhists and also Taoists. Sun was then considered as the reincarnation of Yue Hui (Bodhisattva of Moon Wisdom). Yet, it is noted that Zhang and Sun were husband and wife in name without intimate relationship. Sun was only responsible for leading and propagating Tao. He didn't have much time for his kids but he had exactly 12. He would make time to spend with them.

Zhang moved out of Jining, and in 1931 traveled to Jinan, the capital of Shandong, to spread his teachings. He founded the Hall of Lofty Splendor (Chong Hua Tang) and attracted many followers. These first followers later become Zhang's apostles. From Jinan, Yiguandao spread quickly throughout northern China. Within a year, four more temples were established. In 1934, Zhang went to Tianjin, and established another temple, which became the base of the propagation. By 1937, Tianjin had more than 100 temples. From the city, Zhang's disciples propagated his teachings to various parts of China.

Under the Second Sino-Japanese War, Yiguandao survived and spread rapidly in central China, the cult's apocalyptic beliefs and strong mystical elements attracting many. The politically-chaotic situation during this period helped Yiguandao grow more rapidly. The apocalyptic teaching promised that by following Yiguandao, one would be spared from calamity. By 1940, Yiguandao reached the southern province of Jiangxi. Yiguandao also attracted a number of officials of the Wang Jingwei regime. During 1950, it was estimated there were about 178,000 followers in Beijing and 140,000 followers in Tianjin.

== Death ==
Following the war's end, Zhang was sick. He died on the 15th day of the 8th Lunar Month, during the Mid-Autumn Festival, on 29 September 1947, in the city of Chengdu in Sichuan province while the fuji ceremony is ongoing. It was said that Zhang himself felt ill when the ceremony is ongoing, and decided to leave earlier to meditate alone. It is only the divine revelation from the Venerable Mother that the audience present realized about Zhang's imminent death later. His remains were transported via air to Hongqiao Airport, Shanghai and was later buried in Nanping Hill, Hangzhou. He was given the title Tianran Gufo (天然古佛) (Ancient Buddha Tianran) by the Eternal Mother, and the title Wanguo Jiaozhu (萬國教主) (The Lord of All Nations) by his followers.

== See also ==
- Yiguandao
- Lu Zhongyi
- Sun Suzhen
