= Dipankara =

Figure of Buddhist mythology

Dipankara Buddha
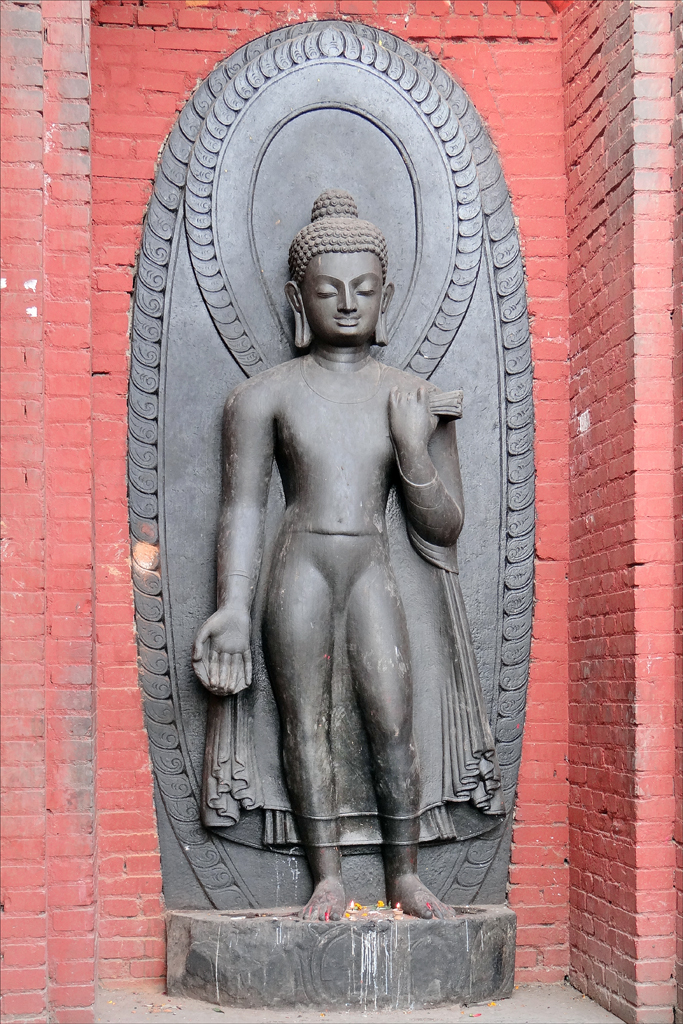
- 7th century statue in a niche of Swayambhunath, Kathmandu, Nepal
- Sanskrit: Dīpaṃkara
- Pāli: Dīpaṅkara
- Burmese: ဒီပင်္ကရာ ([dìpɪ̀ɰ̃kəɹà])
- Chinese: 燃燈佛 (Pinyin: Rándēng Fó)
- Japanese: 燃燈仏(ねんとうぶつ) (romaji: Nentō Butsu)
- Khmer: ព្រះពុទ្ធ ទីបង្ករៈ "Preah Puth Dipankara"
- Korean: 연등불 (RR: Yeondeung Bul)
- Mongolian: ᠵᠣᠯᠠ ᠢᠢᠨ ᠵᠥᠬᠢᠶᠠᠭᠴᠢ᠂ ᠳᠢᠸᠠᠩ᠋ᠭᠠᠷ; Зулын Зохиогч, Дивангар; Zula yin Zohiyagci, Divangar
- Sinhala: දීපඞ්කර බුදුන් වහන්සේ Dipankara Budun Wahanse
- Thai: พระทีปังกรพุทธเจ้า; Phra Thipangkon Phutthachao
- Tibetan: མར་མེ་མཛད་ Wylie: mar me mdzad THL: Marmedzé
- Vietnamese: Nhiên Đăng Phật

Information
- Venerated by: Theravada, Mahayana, Vajrayana
- Attributes: Causer of Light

Dipankara (Pali: Dīpaṅkara; Sanskrit: Dīpaṃkara, "Lamp bearer") or Dipankara Buddha is one of the Buddhas of the past. He is said to have lived on Earth four asankheyyas and one hundred thousand kalpas ago. According to Buddhists, Dipankara was a previous Buddha who attained Enlightenment eons prior to Gautama Buddha, the historical Buddha.

Generally, Buddhists believe that there has been a succession of many Buddhas in the distant past and that many more will appear in the future. Dipankara was one of these previous Buddhas, while Gautama Buddha was the current and most recent Enlightened one, and Maitreya will be the next Buddha in the distant future.

Chinese Buddhism honors Dipankara as one of many Buddhas of the past. Dipankara, Gautama, and Maitreya are "the Buddhas of Three Times" in Yiguandao.

== Iconography ==
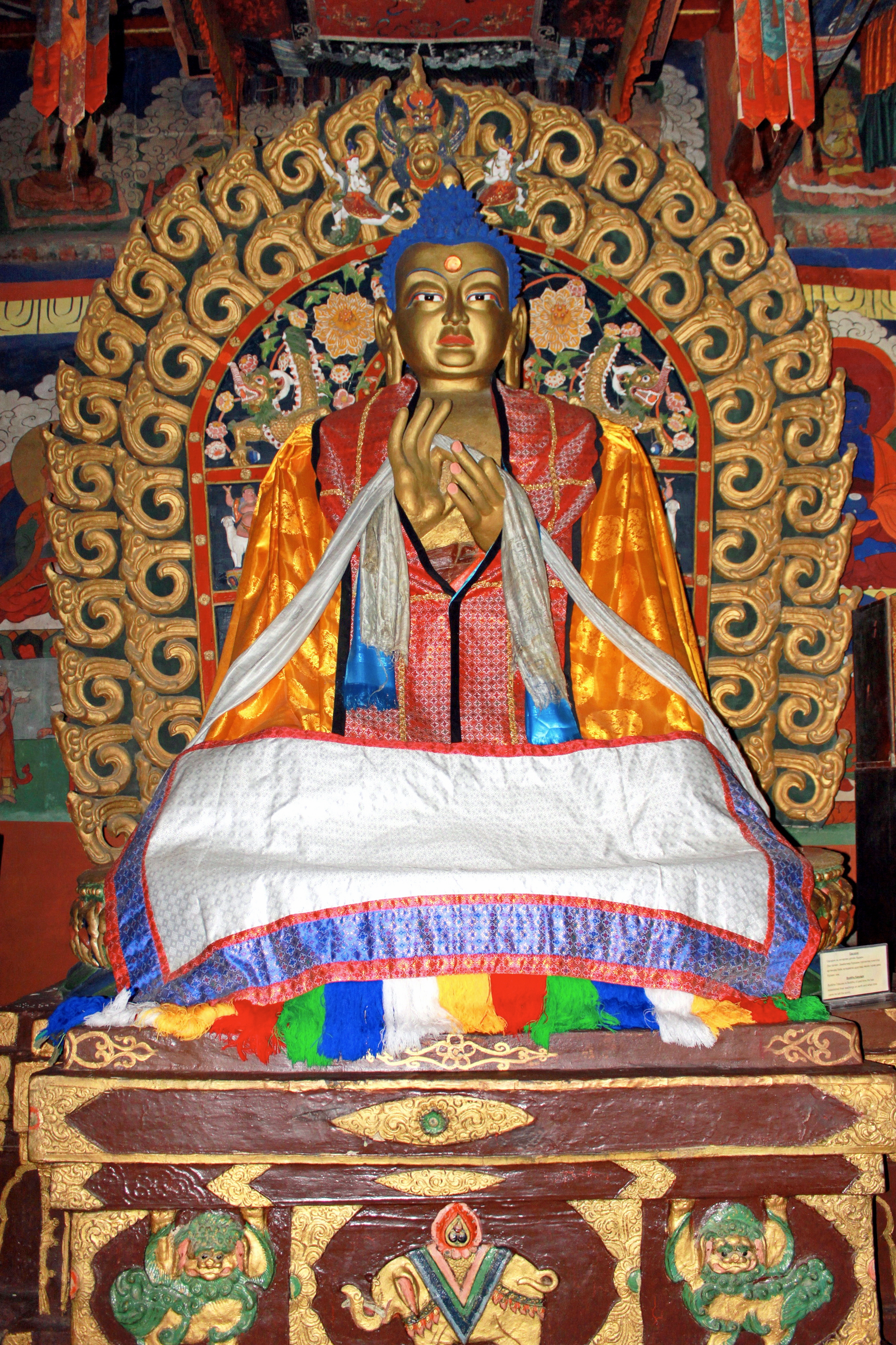
Sanjaa (Dipankara) inside Western Temple in the Erdene Zuu Monastery, Mongolia.

Dipankara is generally represented as a sitting Buddha, but his depictions as a standing Buddha are common in China, Thailand, and Nepal; with the right hand he generally forms a protection mudra (abhaya mudra), and often he forms it with both hands.

Dipankara is rarely depicted alone; He is generally depicted with two bodhisattvas, Manjusri and Vajrapani (common in Java) or Avalokiteśvara and Vajrapani (common in Sri Lanka); or with the Buddhas who come after him, Gautama and Maitreya.

One of the Buddhas of Bamiyan, destroyed by the Taliban government in Afghanistan in 2001, was said to portray Dipankara. Statues of Dipankara can also be found in the Longmen and Yungang Grottoes in China.

== Prediction ==
One story shown in Buddhist art has Gautama Buddha in a former incarnation known as Sumedha, a rich Brahmana turned hermit kneeling and laying his long black hair on the ground, in an act of piety that the Dipankara Buddha could cross a puddle of mud without soiling his feet.

This meeting between Dipankara and Sumedha occurred many lifetimes before Sumedha's eventual enlightenment as Gautama Buddha (Shakyamuni). From this act, Dipankara told Sumedha "In the ages of the future you will come to be a Buddha called 'Shakyamuni'", to which Sumedha replied, "I am to become a Buddha, awakened to enlightenment; may you tread with your feet on my hair - on my birth, old age, and death."

Dipankara then said, "Freed from human existence, you will become an effective teacher, for the sake of the world. Born among the Shakyas, as the epitome of the Triple World, the Lamp of all Beings, you will be known as Gautama. You will be the son of King Suddhodana and Queen Maya. Sariputta and Moggallana will be your chief disciples. Your caretaker will be named Ananda."

In the 40-plus years of his life after enlightenment, Gautama Buddha is said to have recounted almost 554 past life stories, (called Jataka tales) of his prior existences. Gautama Buddha is quoted as saying a person starts the journey to become a Buddha filling 10 Paramita or "perfections". Some sources and scriptures recount that the Bodhisattva Gautama was born as Prince Sumedha in the time of Dipankara, and was rich and gave away all his wealth to become a monk. It is said that Gautama Bodhisattva received his first Niyatha Vivarana, (or definite foresighting by a Buddha) from Dipankara. This encounter, among many other predictions of Gautama Buddha's future enlightenment, can be found in the Mahayana text Sangatha Sutra.

== Veneration ==
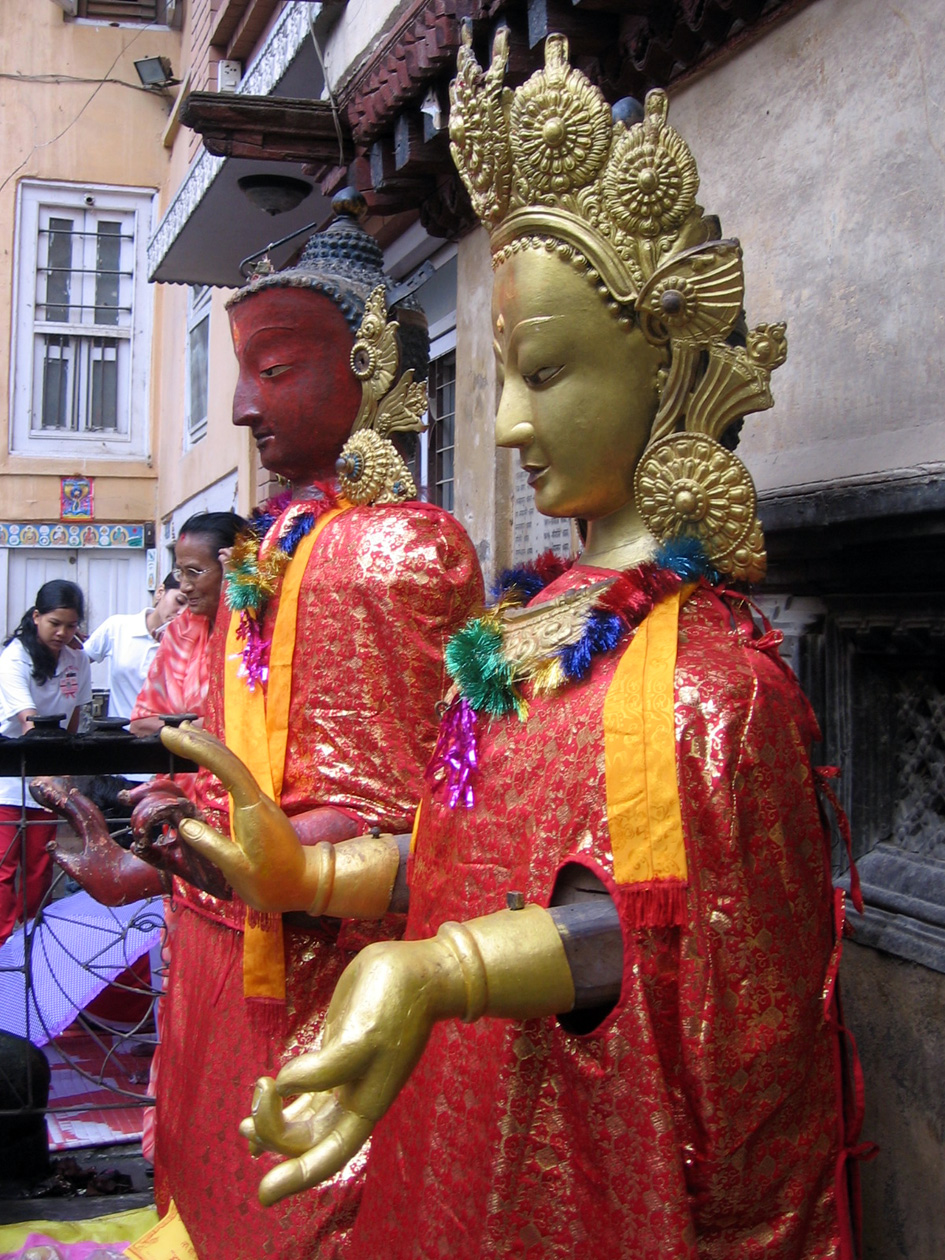
Statues of Dipankara in Kathmandu.

By the 17th century, Dipankara had become a figure of veneration in Nepalese Buddhist communities. These followers consider him a protector of merchants and associate him with alms-giving. He is also considered the protector of sailors, and sometimes statues of Dipankara are found on the coastline to guide and protect the ships in their route.

Some Chinese folk religionists in Taiwan and Chinese overseas communities also worshipped Dipankara Buddha.

The Buddhavamsa says that Dipankara achieved Nirvana in Nandarama, where a stupa was built which was thirty six yojanas high.

== See also ==
- List of the twenty-eight Buddhas
- Randeng Daoren
- Samyak
