= Yiguandao =

Chinese salvationist religious sect

- 一貫道
- Type: Way of Former Heaven sect
- Classification: Chinese salvationist religion
- Scripture: Maitreya salvation sutra (弥勒救苦真经) Divine writings of deities (仙佛慈语); Hundred Fillais Sutra (百孝经); Provisional Rituals (暂订佛规) Yiguandao Canon (一貫道藏)
- 17th Patriach: Lu Zhongyi
- 18th Patriach: Zhang Tianran
- Language: Chinese
- Founder: Wang Jueyi
- Origin: late 19th century Shandong
- Members: China, 1940s: 12 million Japan: ~50,000; South Korea, 2015: 1.3 million Taiwan, 2005: 810,000
- Other names: Zhenli Tiandao (眞理天道), Tiandao (天道)
- Logo: Three sun rays followed by green, red and white suns on the middle, surrounded by blue paddy wreaths

Oracle bone script

Chinese bronze inscriptions

Regular script

The character 母 mu, meaning "mother", in different ancient Chinese scripts. It is used as the symbol of Yiguandao, mostly in a style derivative of oracle bone or bronzeware scripts. According to the religion, the character also means "fire".

Yiguandao / I-Kuan Tao (traditional Chinese: 一貫道; simplified Chinese: 一贯道; pinyin: Yīguàn Dào; Wade–Giles: I^{1}-Kuan^{4} Tao^{4}), (Note: Japanese: 一貫道, romanized: Ikkandō; Korean: 일관도, romanized: Ilgwando; Thai: อนุตตรธรรม, RTGS: Anuttharatham.) meaning the Consistent Way or Persistent Way, is a Chinese salvationist religious sect that emerged in the late 19th century, in Shandong, to become China's most important redemptive society in the 1930s and 1940s, especially during the Japanese invasion. In the 1930s, Yiguandao spread rapidly throughout China led by Zhang Tianran, who is the eighteenth patriarch of the Latter Far East Tao Lineage, and Sun Suzhen, the first matriarch of the Lineage.

Yiguandao started off with a few thousand followers in Shandong in the 1930s, but under the Patriarch and Matriarch's leadership and with missionary work the group grew to become the biggest movement in China in the 1940s with millions of followers. In 1949, Yiguandao was proscribed in mainland China as an illegal secret society and heretical cult as part of the greater antireligious campaign that took place. Yiguandao has since flourished in Taiwan, despite decades of persecution by the Kuomintang that officially ended in 1987 with the legalization of Yiguandao and a government apology. Yiguandao is still not able to be officially promoted in the mainland, but there are many members who live and practice there.

According to Sebastien Billioud, Yiguandao can be viewed as a synthesis between an updated version of the unity of the three teachings (Confucianism, Taoism, and Buddhism) that also incorporated Christianity, Islam (becoming a unity of the five teachings) and millenarianism's eschatology that emphasizes end-time catastrophes and salvation missions.

Yiguandao is characterized by an eschatological and soteriological doctrine, presenting itself as a way to salvation. It also encourages adherents to engage in missionary activity. Yiguandao is the worship of the source of the universal reality personified as the Eternal Venerable Mother, or the Splendid Highest Deity (Chinese: 明明上帝; pinyin: Míngmíng Shàngdì). The highest deity is the primordial energy of the universe, identified in Yiguandao thought with the Tao in the wuji or "unlimited" state and with fire. The name used in contemporary Yiguandao scriptures is the "Infinite Mother" (Chinese: 無極母; pinyin: Wújímǔ) and the "lantern of the Mother" (Chinese: 母燈; pinyin: mǔdēng)—a flame representing the Mother—is the central focus of Yiguandao shrines.

== Beliefs ==
=== Eternal Venerable Mother ===
Yiguandao theology is based on the worship of a figure known as Infinite Mother (Wujimu) and the Eternal Venerable Mother (Wusheng Laomu), a feature shared with other Chinese folk religions. The source of all things, it is neither male nor female, despite its feminine name. It is the primordial force of the universe, the fire that animates all things. It is the Tao, as Yiguandao doctrines explain.

In the 16th century, the Eternal Mother began to take the place of the Holy Patriarch. A mythology surrounding the Mother began to form, integrating beliefs about Maitreya that had been widespread since the Yuan dynasty. The Maitreya belief is millenarian, claiming that the world would soon come to an end and that Maitreya would incarnate on the physical plane to save humanity.

In the Mother belief, Maitreya is one of the three enlightened beings sent by the Mother herself to bring salvation. Further myths explained the creation of the world and humankind: the Eternal Venerable Mother gave birth to yin and yang and two children, Fuxi and Nüwa, who begot auspicious stars and all sentient beings. The human beings were sent to the east and lost their memory of the Mother. The myth of Fuxi and Nüwa is also found in orthodox Chinese mythology.

The figure of the Eternal Mother derives from that of Xiwangmu, the "Queen Mother of the West", the ancient mother goddess of China, related to the mythical Kunlun, the axis mundi, and thus to the Hundun. The Infinite Mother is thought of as omnipotent, and regarded by Yiguandao followers as merciful, worried by her sons and daughters who lost their true nature, and for this reason trying to bring them back to the original heaven. Through its development, the Eternal Mother belief has shown the qualities of the three goddesses Xiwangmu, Nüwa and Guanyin.

=== Rituals, Gods and teachers ===
In all Yiguandao temples, there are three lamps situated on an altar. The central lamp represents the Eternal Mother, while the two side lamps, both known as the Sun and Moon lamps, evenly situated at a lower level, represent Yin and Yang. Generally, in larger public temples, a statue of Maitreya is placed in the central position, accompanied by the Holy Teachers, Jigong on the right, and Yue Hui Bodhisattva on the left, while in Tiandao temples, the statue of Maitreya is flanked by Guanyin on the right and Jigong on the left. In private temples, there is no required configuration. Members can choose statues of other deities, such as Guanyin, Guangong or Lu Dongbin, or they can even choose to have none at all. To invoke rituals, the Welcoming of the Deities (恭迎佛駕) ritual marks the beginning of the ritual by lightening the three lamps using a lighter or incense torch, and concluded by the Departure of the Deities (恭送佛駕) by extinguishing the lamps using a candle snuffer or a hand fan, depending on the sect's requirement.

As Yiguandao's written material explains:

The important thing to keep in mind is that these deities ... serve as reminders for us to always keep their teachings in mind, and we honor them for the virtues they embody, such as tolerance, open-mindedness, cheerfulness and generosity (Maitreya); justice, fairness, honor, courage and loyalty (Guangong); compassion, giving, caring and nurturing (Guanyin).

The patriarchs of the faith are Zhang Tianran and Sun Suzhen. They are considered the final patriarchs of the divine revelation and are revered as divine entities, despite a minority faction (Tiandao) only recognizing Zhang's patriarchy and disputing Sun's patriarchy.

=== Cosmology ===
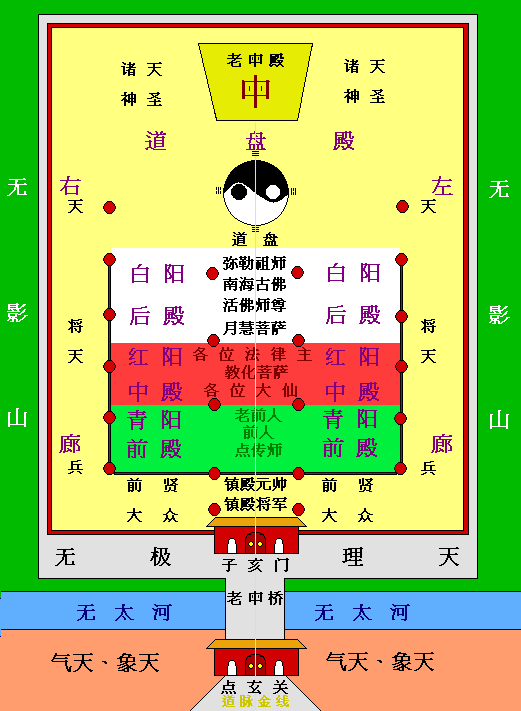
Diagram showing Yiguandao cosmology (in Chinese).

Yiguandao conceives the cosmos as tripartite, consisting of litian (the right heaven), qitian (the spiritual heaven) and xiangtian (the material plane). Litian is the heaven of the Eternal Mother, where there's no cycle of rebirth; qitian is the plane imbued by the gods and spirits who, despite being in a higher realm than human beings, can still incarnate as matter. Xiangtian is the physical world that is composed of all visible things, with colors and shapes, including all the stars and the sky. Only litian is eternal, and qitian and xiangtian will be re-absorbed into litian.

=== Salvation ===
Yiguandao involves an eschatological—soteriological belief: Grieving over the loss of her children, the Eternal Mother sent three enlightened beings to the material world over the "Three Eras". Accordingly, human history is divided into "Three Eras": Qingyang Qi or Green Yang Era, Hongyang Qi or Red Yang Era, and Baiyang Qi or White Yang Era. Dipankara Buddha presided over salvation in the Green Yang Era, Gautama Buddha in the Red Yang Era, and Maitreya Buddha will preside over the third period of salvation, the White Yang Era, which began in 1912 and continues even now.

Extreme ruthlessness and craftiness in human behavior and disasters are associated with the end of the third period and final salvation. Cultivation of the Tao is the opportunity for repentance and purification during the White Yang Era. Those who devote their efforts to the spread of the Tao will be repaid for their merits, regardless of their societal status.

=== Vegetarianism ===
Vegetarianism is one of the core teachings of Yiguandao. Vegetarianism is taught from a variety of perspectives including health, ecology, environmental sustainability, reducing animal suffering and spiritual development. Yiguandao followers are said to operate 90% of Taiwan's vegetarian restaurants.

== Practices and writings ==
=== Three Treasures ===
The rite of initiation involves the "offering of the Three Treasures" (chuan Sanbao；傳三寶), which are the xuanguan (玄關, the heavenly portal), the koujue (口訣, a mantra), and hetong (合同, the hand gesture). The Three Treasures are the saving grace offered by the Eternal Mother to people who received the initiation. They enable Yiguandao members to transcend the circle of birth and death and directly ascend to Heaven after they die.

Yiguandao followers regard the initiation ceremony as the most important ritual. The full meaning of the Three Treasures is a secret of Yiguandao followers and is strictly prohibited from being spread openly to those who have not gone through the initiation process. The Three Treasures are also used in daily life as a form of meditation.

=== Yiguandao Canon ===
A unitary anthology of Yiguandao's writings, the Yiguandao Canon (一貫道藏 Yīguàndào zàng), was published in the 2010s with the purpose of offering a systematic overview of the religious doctrines.

== History ==
=== 19th century origins ===
Yiguandao originated in the late 19th century in Shandong as a branch of Xiantiandao (先天道; "Way of Former Heaven"), which in turn was founded in Jiangxi as an offshoot of the Venerable Officials' teaching of fasting (老官齋教 Lǎoguān zhāijiào), a branch of the Dacheng (大乘 "Great Vehicle") or Yuandun (圓頓 "Sudden Stillness") eastern proliferation of Luoism. It has also been traced to the White Lotus tradition.

In the 1870s, under persecutions from the Qing, Xiantiandao fragmented into several independent groups. One branch led by the Shandong native Wang Jueyi later developed into Yiguandao. According to Yiguandao records, Wang Jueyi was designated as the 15th patriarch of Xiantiandao through a divine revelation through writing. Wang renamed his sect the "Final Salvation" (Mohou Yizhao) and deeply contributed to the development of its theology and ritual, now being regarded as the real founder of modern Yiguandao. In Yiguandao belief, Wang is viewed as an avatar of Maitreya Buddha.

After a persecution started in 1883 because the Qing suspected that the sect intended to organize a rebellion, Wang was forced to live secretly until his death. Liu Qingxu succeeded the leadership becoming the 16th patriarch. In 1905, borrowing a Confucius saying that "the way that I follow is the one that unifies all" (wudao yiyiguanzhi), he gave the religion the name Yiguandao ("Unity Way").

Under Liu the Yiguandao remained small. Things changed after Lu Zhongyi became the 17th patriarch in 1919. Claiming to be the incarnation of Maitreya, Lu gathered thousands of members in Shandong. When Lu died in 1925 one group of the followers he left was led by Zhang Tianran, the man who became the 18th patriarch in following years.

=== Zhang Tianran's leadership and spread in the 1930s ===
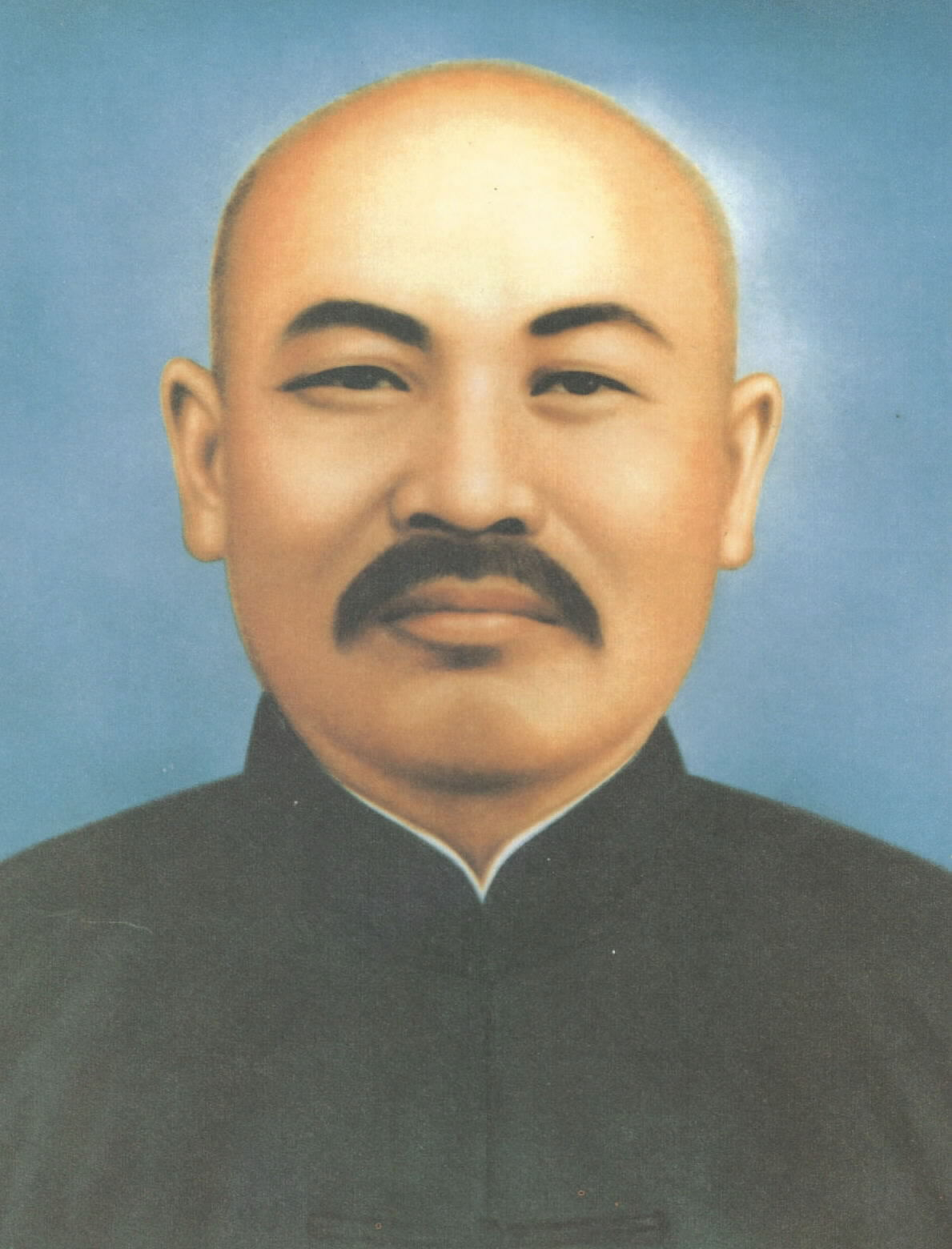
Zhang Tianran.

Between the late years of Qing regime and 1945, China went through a period of crisis, civil unrest and foreign invasion. The Confucian orthodoxy and the empire crumbled quickly. In the republican China between 1912 and 1949 folk religious sects mushroomed and expanded rapidly.

Zhang Tianran, whose secular name was Zhang Guangbi, was born in 1889 in Jining, Shandong. In 1915, he was initiated into Yiguandao by Lu Zhongyi, the 17th patriarch of the sect. After the death of Lu in 1925 the movement fragmented due to strife over the leadership. One of the subgroups that formed was led by Zhang Tianran.

In the late 1920s, Yiguandao became a registered organization with the civil authorities and set up altars, usually in homes, and usually semipublic. During this period, Yiguandao spread its message through the practice of spirit writing, in which a medium (typically a boy), would commune with the gods and write messages in sand which others interpreted. Initiation in Yiguandao was typically informal.

In 1930, Zhang Tianran became the 18th patriarch of Yiguandao. He took Sun Suzhen as his partner, proclaiming that their marriage was a message from the Eternal Mother, and that he was the incarnation of Jigong, a deified miracle monk that lived between the late 12th and the 13th century. However, few members welcomed the new claims; many challenged the validity of the revelation and left the group. For this reason, Zhang Tianran and his wife moved to Jinan in 1931. There, different religious groups were competing with each other, and Zhang Tianran began preaching Yiguandao himself.

Zhang Tianran recruited hundreds of followers, and Jinan became the main base of Yiguandao. Many initiated members began preaching in other big cities, where Yiguandao was well received. From 1934 Yiguandao missionaries were sent to Tianjin and Qingdao. To facilitate the spread Zhang Tianran restructured Yiguandao, that since then had preserved the nine-levels structure (jiupin liantai) of Xiantiandao. The new structure had four levels, Zhang as the patriarch, and below him the leaders of the way (daozhang), the initiators (dianchuan shi), and further below the masters of the altars (tanzhu). The initiators functioned as missionaries, while the masters of altars were managers of administrative units composed of multiple congregations.

With the rapid growth of Yiguandao, Zhang Tianran's status as a divine patriarch (shizun) was strengthened, with a large number of pamphlets published to justify his divinity.

=== Fuji, shanshu and rituals ===
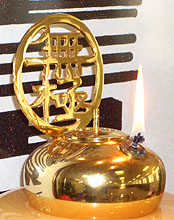
An oil lamp is an element at the center of a Yiguandao shrine, below the effigy of Maitreya.

With its centralized authority and highly degree of organization, Yiguandao had an extraordinary power of mobilization. At first, fuji, the practice of receiving direct revelations from the gods which is closely linked to the Chinese intellectual tradition since the Song dynasty, contributed to the dynamism of the movement.

Divine revelations were published in "morality books" (shanshu), and distributed to the general public for moral edification of the society. Divine writing was also used to offer oracles for everyday problems.

Fuji was introduced into Yiguandao despite Wang Jueyi, the 15th patriarch of the lineage, discouraging it. Zhang Tianran distinguished between "innate writing" (xiantian ji), received by juvenile media and considered superior to "acquired writing" (houtian ji), received by old media. Youth purity is considered more conductive of divine revelation. Zhang stressed that only Yiguandao fuji is xiantian ji (revealing the original Heaven).

Divinely inspired writing was later rejected by some branches of Yiguandao, as new scriptures produced new schisms, and gradually declined within the religion as a whole.

Yiguandao also spread and gathered financial support through the performance of "rituals of salvation of the ancestors". Rules and practices for the followers were also systematized. Zhang Tianran also gave much importance to aggressive missionary work, contrasting with the Chinese tradition of peaceful coexistence. In 1938 he held missionary workshops named "stove meetings" (lu hui) to train missionaries in Tianjin. Hundreds of missionaries were trained in these workshops, and they were sent all over the country. Many became influential leaders of Yiguandao.

=== Rapid growth in the 1940s ===
Through missionary activity, in the political and social turmoil caused by the Japanese invasion of China in the 1940s, that made Yiguandao's millenarian beliefs more convincing to the masses, the religion grew rapidly, reaching an estimated membership of 12 million.

Zhang developed a close relationship with the Japanese occupiers. A number of top officials of the Japanese puppet government of Wang Jingwei converted to Yiguandao. As a result, both the Nationalists and the Communists condemned Yiguandao; at the end of the Second Sino-Japanese War, Zhang was arrested and the society was banned. During the Chinese Civil War, Yiguandao became increasingly anti-communist. As the Communists came into power, some networks of Yiguandao engaged in armed conflict with the Communists, interpreting the Communist victory in the civil war as showing that the "three disasters and eight difficulties" as the beginning of the third kalpa.

=== Suppression in China after 1949 ===
With the rise of the Chinese Communist Party in 1949, Yiguandao was suppressed, being viewed as the biggest reactionary huidaomen. In December 1950, The People's Daily published the editorial "Firmly Banning Yiguandao" (Jianjue Qudi Yiguandao), proclaiming that the movement had been used as a counterrevolutionary tool by imperialists and the Kuomintang. The article claimed that Yiguandao members were traitors collaborating with the Japanese invaders, Kuomintang spies, and reactionary landlords.

The editorial marked the beginning of the nationwide campaign of eradication of Yiguandao. The main target of the campaign was to destroy the movement's organization and leadership. The top leaders were executed or sent to prison, the members were forced to undergo political re-education and they were kept under close surveillance.

An exhibition denouncing Yiguandao was held in Beijing in January 1951. In 1952, the communists released "The Way of Persistently Harming People" (Yiguan Hairen Dao), a film against Yiguandao. A number of Yiguandao believers, including Sun Suzhen, fled to Hong Kong and later to Taiwan, where the religion currently thrives.

=== Spread to other regions and return to the mainland ===
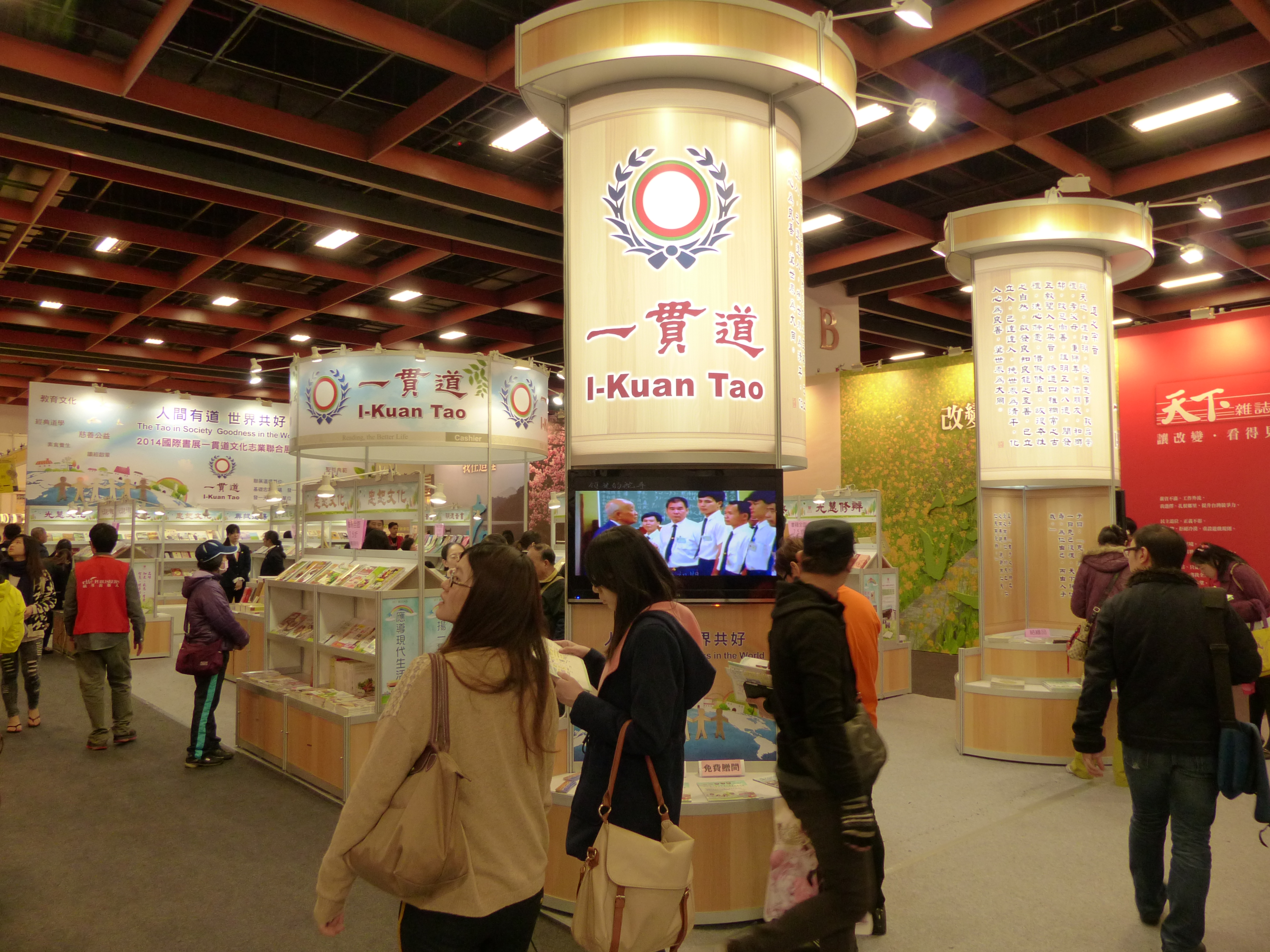
Yiguandao advocated stand at the 22nd Taipei International Book Fair (2014), near the Taipei World Trade Center.

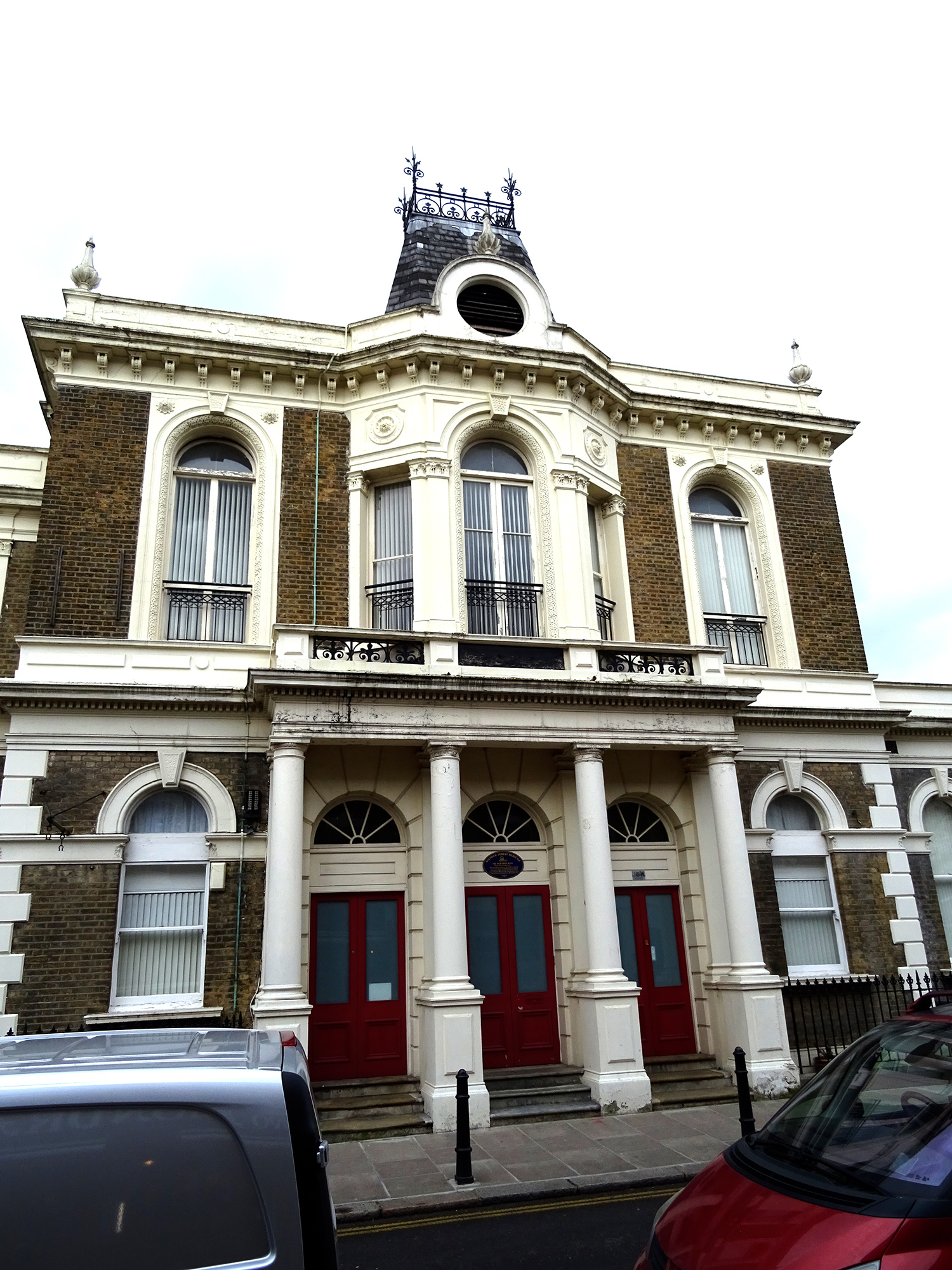
Yiguandao UK headquarters in Walthamstow, London.

==== Taiwan ====
In Kuomintang-governed Taiwan after 1949, there was initially a climate of restrictions of Chinese traditional religions and Yiguandao was attacked as immoral, politically charged, and suspect of cooperation with communists of mainland China. Yiguandao was officially outlawed in 1952 and driven underground. The Buddhist circles of Taiwan denounced it as heterodox "White Lotus" and called for its suppression, and succeeded in opposing the government when there was a proposal for lifting the ban in 1981. The effort to legalize Yiguandao came from Chou Lien-hua and Chu Hai-yuan of the Institute of Ethnology at Academia Sinica, who lobbied on its behalf.

In the period of rapid economic growth of Taiwan, starting in the 1960s and proceeding through the 1980s and 1990s, Yiguandao spread its influence by entering business and industrial development. Many members became important businessmen, for instance Chang Yung-fa, the founder of the Evergreen Marine Corporation, was the chief initiator of a Yiguandao subdivision and in the 1990s almost all the managers of his corporation were Yiguandao members. The same strategy of "combining missionary work and business" facilitates the development of Yiguandao in mainland China, where Yiguandao businessmen began reestablishing the religion since the 1980s by means of investment. Another mean by which Yiguandao expanded in Taiwan was that of charity.

Through the years of the ban Yiguandao persisted as an underground phenomenon. In 1963 it was reported that the religion had about fifty thousand members, and grew rapidly through the 1970s and the 1980s, counting more than 324,000 members in 1984. Five years later in 1989 Yiguandao had 443,000 members or 2.2% of Taiwan's population. Recognizing the social power of the religion, the Kuomintang officially gave Yiguandao legal status on 13 January 1987. As of 2005 Yiguandao has 810,000 members in Taiwan (3.5% of the population) and tens of thousands of worship halls. Its members operate many of Taiwan's vegetarian restaurants.

The Republic of China I-Kuan Tao Association was formed in 1988 as an umbrella organisation bringing together the majority of lineages.

==== Korea ====
Yiguandao was transmitted in the Korean peninsula (Hanja: 일관도 Ilgwando) in the 1940s through the pioneering work of Dukbuk Lee, Sujeun Jang, Buckdang Kim and Eunsun Kim. Korean Ilgwando is incorporated as the International Moral Association which was founded in the 1960s by Buckdang Kim (1914-1991), and as of 2015 it has 1.3 million members in South Korea (2.5% of the population).

==== Japan ====
In the 1950s, Yiguandao spread to Japan (where its name is Ikkandō), during the persecutions in mainland China. In Japan, it has attracted about fifty thousand members from both Chinese minorities and Japanese ethnic groups. It is articulated into two main branches: ① Kōmōseidōin (孔孟聖道院 Kǒng Mèng Shèngdào Yuàn, "School of the Holy Way of Confucius and Mencius") and Sentendaidōnihonsoōtendan (先天大道日本総天壇 Xiāntiāndàdào Rìběn Zǒng Tiāntán, "Japan Headquarters of the Great Way of Former Heaven") with 8000 members each; and ② Tendō (天道 Tiāndào, "Heavenly Way") and Tendo Sotendan (天道総天壇 Tiāndào Zǒng Tiāntán, "Headquarters of the Heavenly Way") respectively with 300 and 30,000 members.

==== Southeast Asia ====
Since the 1970s, Yiguandao spread to Southeast Asia. In Thailand (where it is named อนุตตรธรรม Anuttharatham) it has grown so strong in recent decades to come into conflict with Buddhism; as of 2009, there were over 7000 worship halls, and it is reported that 200.000 Thais each year convert into the religion. In Singapore, all branches of the Yiguandao are active, the Baoguang-Jiande branch being the most successful. The Yiguandao has three great public halls (white multiple-storied buildings with traditional Chinese architectural features) and more than 2,000 house churches in Singapore. In Indonesia, in order to gain legal recognition, followers of Yiguandao have registered under the label of Buddhism as a movement known as Maitreya Buddhism.

==== Mainland China ====
The relationship between the government of mainland China and Yiguandao began to change by the mid-1980s. In those years, Yiguandao was spreading secretly back to mainland China from Taiwan; entrepreneurs belonging to Yiguandao were building temples, networks and factories. According to scholar Philip Clart, missionaries from Taiwan have been particularly active in proselytization in Fujian, where there is strong presence of Taiwanese-owned companies and joint ventures. According to a 1996 report, the movement can be found in every province of China. In 1978, there was one of the biggest cases of government suppression against the "Fraternal Army of the Soldiers of Heaven" (天兵弟子軍 Tiānbīng Dìzǐjūn), which has been formed by thousands of Yiguandao members. As of 1999, the Japanese publication Tokyo Sentaku reported that there were 2 million Tiandao members in Sichuan, equal to 2.4% of the province's population.

In the 1990s, backroom meetings between Chinese government officials and representatives of Yiguandao were held; by the mid-2000s these meetings had become public. Between 2000 and 2005, Yiguandao was removed from the Chinese government's official list of "evil cults", and branches of the organization were tacitly allowed to return to China. Yiguandao also cooperates with academic and non-governmental organizations in mainland China. In an attitude of growing interest for the movement on the mainland, by the 2010s a Yiguandao text was published in the People's Republic.

However, Yiguandao remains illegal in China in common with the majority of Chinese salvationist religions which relocated to Taiwan in 1949. Human rights and religious freedom groups have noted ongoing harassment of Yiguandao followers in China. In December 2023, a Taiwanese member of Yiguandao was arrested in China on suspicion of spreading Yiguandao teachings. Further arrests occurred in December 2024.

Recent reports have fuelled speculation that authorities in China have renewed and intensified their persecution of Yiguandao and other Taiwan-linked religions movements.

== Structure and schisms ==
Yiguandao is a collection of at least nineteen divisions (subsects). Generally all of them share the rule to not proselytize among members of other branches of the "golden line" of Yiguandao. Since the 1980s some denominations of Yiguandao have established a professionalized clergy. The majority of subsects affiliated with the Republic of China I-Kuan Tao Association upon its formation in 1988. The World I-Kuan Tao Headquarters, encompassing federations throughout the world, was established in Alhambra, California in 1996.

The primary organization unit of Yiguandao are local worship halls (佛堂 fótáng, literally "halls of awakening"). Although some of them may develop into elaborate complexes of public buildings, they are in most cases private house churches (the gatherings are held in private homes of Yiguandao members), a type of organism which provides Yiguandao the ability to blossom in the private sphere circumventing states' definitions and management of "religion".

Following the death of Zhang Tianren in 1947, the majority faction followed Sun Suzhen while a minority faction followed Zhang's widow Liu Shuaizhen. The latter group is now known as Tien Tao or Tiandao (天道) under the auspices of the Republic of China Tiandao Association (中華民國天道總會).

There are a number of divisions which are no longer considered to be part of Yiguandao; some of them are: the Miledadao founded by Wang Hao-te in 1982, the Haizidao founded by Lin Jixiong in 1984, the Holy Church of China (Zhonghua Shengjiao) founded by Ma Yongchang in 1980, the Guanyindao founded by Chen Huoguo in 1984, the Yuande Shentan founded by Wu Ruiyuan, and the Jiulian Shengdao founded by Lin Zhenhe in 1992.

== See also ==
- Maitreya teachings
- Caodaism
- New religious movement

== Sources ==
- Billioud, Sébastien; Joel Thoraval (2015), The Sage and the People: The Confucian Revival in China, Oxford University Press, ISBN 978-0190258146
- Billioud, Sébastien (2017). "Yiguandao's Patriarch Zhang Tianran: Hagiography, Deification and Production of Charisma in a Modern Religious Organization". In Ownby, David; Goossaert, Vincent; Zhe, Ji (eds.). Making Saints in Modern China. Oxford University Press. pp. 209–240. ISBN 978-0190494568.
- Billioud, Sébastien (2020), Reclaiming the Wilderness, Contemporary Dynamics of the Yiguandao, Oxford University Press, ISBN 9780197529133
- Brown, Iem (1990), "Agama Buddha Maitreya: A Modern Buddhist Sect in Indonesia", Southeast Asian Anthropology (9)
- Goossaert, Vincent; Palmer, David A. (2012), The Religious Question in Modern China, University of Chicago Press, ISBN 9780226005331
- Guangyu, Song (2010), "Religious Propagation, Commercial Activities, and Cultural Identity: The Spread and Development of the Yiguandao in Singapore", Chinese Studies in History, 44 (1–2): 91–120, doi:10.2753/CSH0009-4633440104
- Haar, B. J. ter (1992), The White Lotus Teachings in Chinese Religious History, University of Hawaii Press, ISBN 9780824822187
- Kim, David William (2015). A Chinese New Religious Movement in Modern Korea. XXI. World Congress of the International Association for the History of Religions. Erfurt, Germany.
- Kuo, Cheng-Tian (2017), Religion and nationalism in Chinese societies, Amsterdam University Press, ISBN 978-9048535057
- Lu, Yunfeng (2008), The Transformation of Yiguan Dao in Taiwan Adapting to a Changing Religious Economy, Lexington Books, ISBN 9780739117194
- Ma, Xisha; Huiying Meng (2011), Popular Religion and Shamanism, Brill, ISBN 978-9004174559
- Munro, Robin; Mickey Spiegel (1994). Detained in China and Tibet: A Directory of Political and Religious Prisoners. Human Rights Watch. ISBN 978-1564321053.
  - List first published in: "Appendix: Sects and Societies Recently or Currently Active in the PRC". Chinese Sociology & Anthropology. 21 (4): 103–104. 1989. doi:10.2753/CSA0009-46252104102.
- Ownby, David (2015). "Redemptive Societies in Twentieth Century China". In Goosaert, Vincent; Kiely, Jan; Lagerway, John (eds.). Modern Chinese Religion, 1850-1950. Brill. pp. 685–730. ISBN 9789004304642.
- Palmer, David (2011), "Redemptive Societies in Cultural and Historical Context", Journal of Chinese Theatre, Ritual and Folklore / Minsu Quyi (173): 1–12
- Topley, Marjorie; DeBernardi, Jean (2011), Cantonese Society in Hong Kong and Singapore: Gender, Religion, Medicine and Money, Hong Kong University Press, ISBN 9789888028146
