= Xiantiandao =

Current of Chinese folk religion

Xiantiandao 先天道
- Classification: Chinese salvationist religions
- Founder: Huang Dehui
- Origin: late 17th century Shandong
- Other names: Green / Blue Lotus Sect (青蓮教), Xiantianmen (先天門), Xiantianxuanguandacheng (先天玄關大道), Tiandao (天道), Golden Elixir Way/ Jindandao (金丹道), Sanhuang Shengzujiao (三皇聖祖教), Yuandun Dachengjiao (圓墩大乘教), Jiuliantang (九連堂), Baiyanghui (白陽會)

The Xiantiandao (Chinese: 先天道; pinyin: Xiāntiān Dào; lit. 'Way of Former Heaven', or "Way of the Primordial"; Vietnamese: Tiên Thiên Đạo, Japanese: Sentendō), or known as Blue/Green Lotus sect (青蓮教), also simply Tiandao (天道; Tiāndào; 'Way of Heaven'; Vietnamese: Thiên Đạo, Japanese: Tendō), is one of the most productive currents of Chinese folk religious sects such as the White Lotus Sect, characterised by representing the principle of divinity as feminine and by a concern for salvation (moral completion) of mankind.

Xiantiandao was founded in Jiangxi in the 17th-century Qing dynasty as an offshoot of the Venerable Officials' teaching of fasting (老官齋教; Lǎoguān zhāijiào), a branch of the Dacheng (大乘 "Great Vehicle") or Yuandun (圆顿 "Sudden Stillness") eastern proliferation of Luoism. It has also been traced to the earlier Wugongdao (五公道 "Way of the Five Lords"), a Yuan dynasty offshoot of the White Lotus tradition.

The Xiantiandao religions were considered heterodox and suppressed throughout the history of China; they are still mostly forbidden in Mainland China, yet they thrive in Taiwan where at least 7% of the population adheres to some sect derived from the Xiantiandao.

The Xiantiandao movement is not limited only to Chinese-speaking countries, with at least one sect, the Tendō (天道; "Way of Heaven" or "Heavenly Path"), active in Japan. In Vietnam, "Tiên Thiên Đạo" doctrines ultimately influenced the rise of the Minh Đạo sects since the 17th century.

Sects that are or have been considered as part of the Xiantiandao stream are:

- Guigendao (归根道 "Way of the Return to the Root")
- Guiyidao (皈依道, "Way of the Return to the One"), best known by its corporate name of School of the Way of the Return to the One or simply School of the Way (道院 Dàoyuàn)
- Shengdao (圣道 "Holy Way"), best known by its corporate name of Tongshanshe (同善社 "Community of the Goodness")
- Jiugongdao (九宫道 "Way of the Nine Palaces")
- Tiandi teachings (天帝教 "Heavenly Deity")
- Yaochidao (瑤池道 "Way of the Jasper Lake")
- Yiguandao (一貫道 "Complete Way")
  - Haizidao (亥子道 "Way of the Children")
  - Miledadao (弥勒大道 "Great Way of Maitreya")
  - Jiulian Shengdao (九莲圣道)
- Yixin Tiandao Longhua Hui (一心天道龙华会 "Dragon Flower Church of the Heart-bound Heavenly Way")
- Yuanmingdao (圆明道 "Way of the Bright Circle")

== History ==
The differentiation of the Xiantiandao subtradition out of the general field of Chinese popular sects is commonly attributed to the so-called ninth patriarch Huang Dehui. The Yiguandao and the Tongshanshe sects legitimize themselves by tracing their patriarchal lines through Huang Dehui to the mythical patriarchs of early Chinese history. Huang Dehui was the successor of Luo Weiqun (羅蔚群) or sometime known as Luo Weixing (罗维行), one of the descendants of Luo Qing of the Eastern Great Vehicle sect (東大乘教) who spread the teachings in Jiangxi. One of the sect led by Huang Dehui was later known as Xiantiandao (先天道). Official documents of the Qing dynasty (清代官书) refer to this sect as the Green/Blue Lotus sect (青蓮教) or by another name the Golden Herb Road/Jindandao (金丹道). This sect unites the three religions by practicing Confucian manners, Daoist practices, and Buddhist precepts. It was named Green Lotus to compete with the then-popular White Lotus sect. It was very popular in Sichuan, Yunnan-Guizhou and Hubei, and staged many rebellions to overthrow the Qing dynasty and restore the Ming dynasty, but was successfully suppressed by the Qing Dynasty government.

In 1690, Huang Dehui was arrested and executed by the Qing government. The leadership of the sect was continued several decades later by Wu Zixiang (吳紫祥). Wu changed the name of his group to Wupanjiao (五盤教). He was also arrested and sentenced to death. Leadership continued to the eleventh patriarch, He Ruo (何若) / He Liaoku (何了苦). In 1790, as the group leader, He Liaoku was sent to Longli, Guizhou to serve in the army as a punishment from the government, thus the Green Lotus sect spread to Guizhou. He Liao Ku's disciple Yuan Zhiqian (袁志謙, known as the 12th patriarch) spread the teachings from Guizhou to Yunnan, Sichuan, and Hubei, where it flourished. In 1823 he founded Xigang Tang (西港堂) in Chengdu and worked actively to spread the teachings in the Yangtze River valley. In 1826, the leadership was continued by Xu Ji'nan (徐吉南) and Yang Shouyi (楊守一) who became the 13th patriarchs. Shortly after, patriarchs Xu and Yang were arrested and executed by the Qing government in 1828. History shows that several new sub-sects were born after this era including Yuanming Dao (圆明道), Guiyi Dao (皈依道), Tongshan She (同善社) and the most important for Taiwan's religious history is Yiguandao (一貫道). The patriarchal lines of these sects are largely identical down to the thirteenth patriarch Yang Shouyi and Xu Ji'nan, after whom the lines split and ultimately lead to the development of some group as separate sects. The other groups maintain a different model of linear patriarchal succession.

In 1834, Xiantiandao elected five preaching leaders, known as the 'Five Elders' (五老). At colloquy of seven deities (七聖) held in 1843 in Yuncheng (雲城), it was decided that the sect would henceforth be divided into five branches headed by patriarchs named after the Five Elements (water, fire, wood, metal and earth). Xiantiandao texts often refer to the "Precious register of Cloud City", according to the Yuncheng Precious Mantra (雲城寶籙), the Seven Saints are "the patriarchs in charge of universal salvation in the three world ages" (開辦三期普度之祖). In that period, the Green Lotus sect later united with parties and armed groups to fight the officers and soldiers, and became a secret religious group, causing much unrest." In 1845, the Green Lotus sect staged a rebellion in Wuchang but failed.

Later, An Tianjue (安天爵) of the Wood, Chen Yijing (陈依精) of the Fire, Song Chaozhen 宋潮真) of the Earth were arrested by the Qing government and put to death. Pang Chaofan (彭超凡) / Peng Yifa (彭依法) of the Water, and Lin Zhuguan (林祝官) / Lin Yimi (林依秘) of the Metal escaped and evaded being arrested. These Peng Chaofan and Lin Zhuguan were later regarded as the 14th patriarch and 15th patriarch by many Xiantiandao groups. At the end of the Daoguang period, Peng Chaofan continued to preach in Sichuan under the banner of Xiantiandao. Meanwhile, Li Zhuguan founded the Hall of Western Heaven (西乾堂) as a shelter for members of the Green Lotus sect which was later renamed Dongzhentang (東震堂) by Wang Jueyi (the 15th patriarch of Yiguandao). Yao Hetian who became the 14th patriarch of Yiguandao was probably also one of the successors of Li Zhuguan."

In the beginning, the main centers of Xiantiandao development were in Jiangxi and Sichuan provinces. In 1860, the sub-sect headed by Peng Yifa was introduced to Guangdong from Hubei province by his follower Chen Fushi 陳復始. Chen convert Lin Fashan 林法善 in Qingyuan, before going into retirement in Yichang 宜昌 in Hubei. In 1863, Lin Fashan founded the Cangxia Gudong (藏霞古洞) temple on Yuxia Mountain (嵎峽山) in Qingyuan county, which is the starting point of the Cangxia sub-branch and the starting point of Xiantiandao in Guangdong." Lin Fashan had two main disciples: Huang Benyuan 黃本源 (aka Daochu 道初) and Li Zhigen 李植根 (aka Jingquan Xiansheng 淨泉先生). While Huang took over the leadership of the Cangxia branch from Lin Fashan, Li in 1871 founded the Jinxiadong (錦霞洞) temple in Qingyuan. For the future regional development of Xiantiandao, Cangxiadong and Jinxiadong were both very important, with Huang spreading the teachings to the north and Li spreading the teachings to the south."

In 1873, the last of the Five Elders (15th patriarch), Lin Zhuguang died from illness in Mukou. Lin Zhuguang was the last patriarch of Xiantiandao who is still agreed upon by many Xiantiandao sub-groups. Afterwards, because Xiantiandao split into so many small groups, there was no agreement from each group on who the next patriarch should be, so each sub-group had its own Taoist lineage. After that, Xiantiandao spread throughout China and some parts of Southeast Asia."

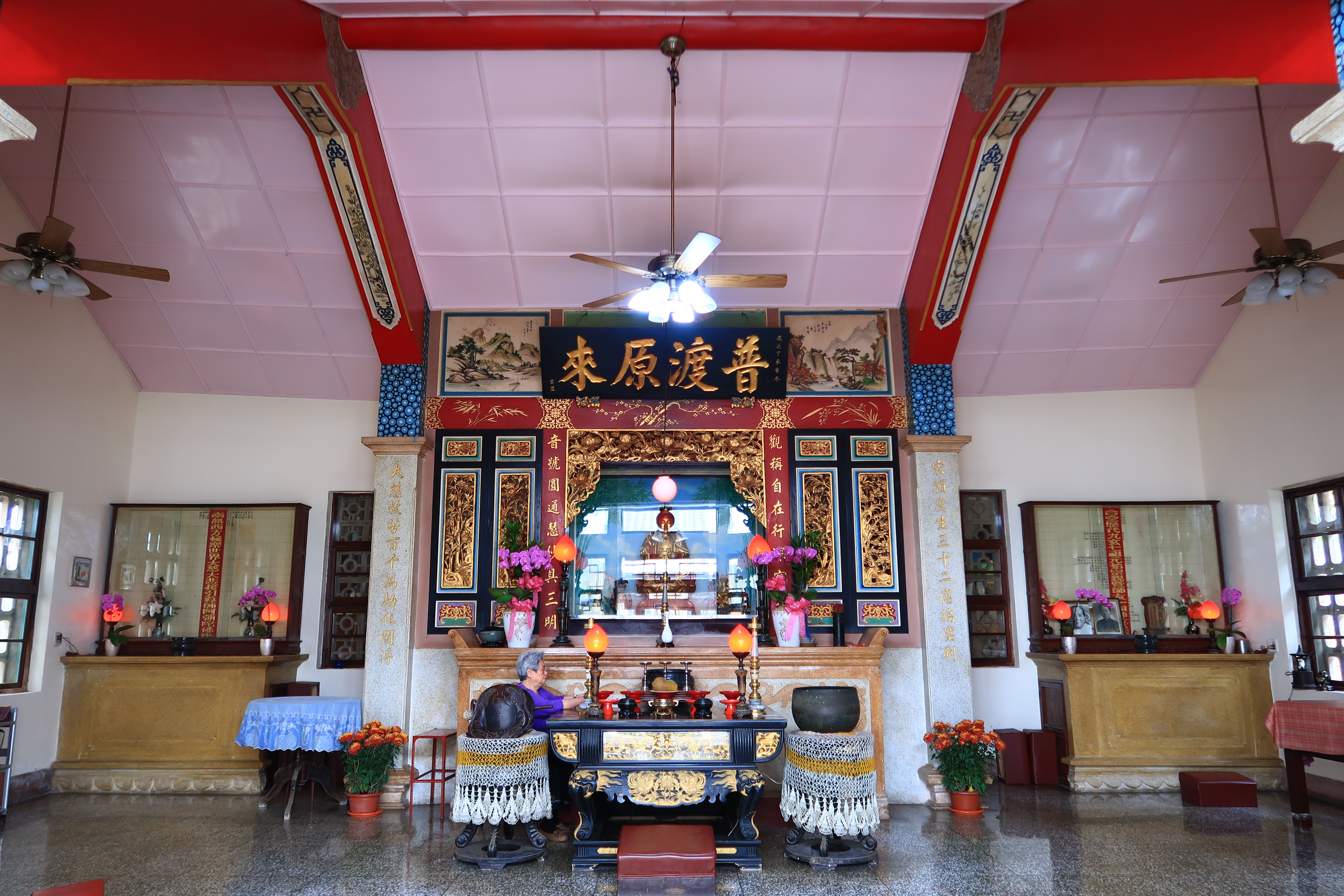
Cheng-Yuan Temple (澄源堂), in Penghu, Taiwan, one of the temples following the Xiantiandao (先天道) tradition, founded in 1879.

In the first half of the 20th century, there was tremendous growth in one of the Xiantiandao-rooted groups, Yiguandao. However, most of the other Xiantiandao groups did not develop into large organizations. Although some Xiantiandao groups joined forces to register Zhongguo Sanjiao Shengdao Zonghui (中國三教聖道總會) with the Beiyang regime in 1923, in reality Xiantiandao seems to have remained just a collection of independent temples and networks running on their own."

Tianyuangong, a temple of Yiguandao in Tamsui District, New Taipei City, Taiwan.

== Belief ==
=== Eschatology ===
The theory of the three sun periods is contained in Huangji jindan (皇極金蛋), the central scripture of Xiantiandao written by Huang Dehui. The Huangji jindan is created based on the "Precious Scroll of the Golden Herb and the Nine-leaf Lotus for Rectifying Faith, Restoring Perfection Back to the Hometown" (皇極金丹九蓮正信歸真還鄉寶卷) or Jiulian Baojuan for short (九蓮寶卷) which later became the main basis of the doctrine of the Xiantiandao sect. These three periods are known as the Green sun (清陽; qingyang), Red sun (紅陽; hongyang), and White sun (白陽; baiyang) Periods. In Xiantiandao's scheme of things, the first messenger was Dipankara Buddha in the green sun period, whose preaching brought 200 million lost children back home, the second was Sakyamuni Buddha in the red sun period, who saved another 200 million children. This leaves another 9.2 billion souls still trapped and in need of saving. The next savior figure is Maitreya who is considered to be the last Buddha of the white sun period.

=== Mysterious Door ===
The Jiulian Baojuan (九蓮寶卷) describes secret jewel called the holy mysterious door (玄關) during initiation as a way to return to heaven. This tradition is a salvation tradition carried over from the Luoist group led by the patriarch Yin Ji'nan and became an important ritual of the Xiantiandao led by Huang Dehui. The transmission process is believed to free initiated followers from the gates of hell and the demons that escort the recently deceased to the afterlife (無常). The transmission of secret mantra and the opening of mysterious door are part of initiation. Proper initiation by a master is an important key to the path to salvation. Salvation here means returning to Eternal Heaven where Laomu reside. One of the quotes from the Jiulian Baojuan is as follows:

Those who are destined by their karma will board the golden boat and leave the sea of suffering together. They will meet the wuwei Patriarch (無為生祖) who transmits the mantra and the dots [of the Mysterious Way]. Thus they will return to their origin and return to their source. The teaching of the Golden Herb (金丹法) continues through the three cosmic periods, opening the [gates] of heaven and closing the [doors] of earth. If they have penetrated the Mysterious Path (玄關), the holy body becomes real and together they will reach the Native Place. One must meet a teacher who dots and opens the aperture of the Mysterious Door to manifest the future purple golden body.

=== Vegetarianism ===
A distinctive trait of all the sects under the Green Lotus rubric is their vegetarianism, a practice that gained support from Chinese society at the time, particularly in certain areas. According to records, Xiantiandao was the strictest in observing a vegetarian diet, and did not allow its members to marry. Japanese researchers in the field noted that the requirements for entry into the sect were the most difficult to meet. For the sect, vegetarianism was just one part of an overall regimen of physical and spiritual purification that would enable its followers to survive the turmoil of the coming millennium (in the process making them immune to government weapons), and prepare them for the "life to come" (來生).

== Theological and practical differences ==
Along with the written works of the founding patriarchs, spirit-writing provides a distinct corpus of scriptures for each individual sect, that develops the shared themes in different directions and serves to differentiate the individual group from related sects. The variations on the central theme are many: for example, different sects use different names for the supreme deity, the Yiguandao and the Tongshanshe calling her "Venerable Mother of Limitless Pole" (Wuji Laomu) and the Yaochidao the "Mother of the Jasper Lake" (Yaochimu).

The Daoyuan diverges from the common maternal pattern by describing the supreme deity as male, naming him "Holiest Venerable Patriarch of the Primordial Heaven" (Zhisheng Xiantian Laozu). Despite these and many other differences in liturgy, organization, and doctrine, ultimately each Xiantiandao sect represents a variation on a central theme. Other movements have significantly departed: the Tiandi teachings movements have shifted to a focus on the Tian.

== See also ==
- Chinese folk religion
- Chinese salvationist religions
- Fuji (planchette writing)
- Heterodox teachings (Chinese law)
- Tiandihui
- Xi Wang Mu

== Sources ==
- Clart, Philip (2014). Religious Publishing and Print Culture in Modern China: 1800–2012. Brill. ISBN 978-1-61451-499-2.
- Goossaert, Vincent; Palmer, David A. (2011). The Religious Question in Modern China. University of Chicago Press. ISBN 0-226-00533-X.
- Haar, Bernard J. ter (1999). The White Lotus Teachings in Chinese Religious History. University of Hawaii Press. ISBN 0-8248-2218-8.
- Haar, Bernard J. ter (2015). A Lay Buddhist Movement in Late Imperial China. University of Hawai Press. ISBN 978-0-8248-5338-9.
- 馬 (Ma), 國棟 (Guodong) (1996). 天道五教(一贯道)的真相讲义. 香港基督徒短期宣教訓練中心.
- Ma, Xisha; Huiying Meng (2011). Popular Religion and Shamanism. Brill. ISBN 978-90-04-17455-9.
- Palmer, David A. (October–December 2008). "Les mutations du discours sur les sectes en Chine moderne". Archives de sciences sociales des religions (144).
- Palmer, David (2011). "Redemptive Societies in Cultural and Historical Context". Journal of Chinese Theatre, Ritual and Folklore / Minsu Quyi (173): 1–12.
- Seiwert, Hubert Michael (2003). Popular Religious Movements and Heterodox Sects in Chinese History. Brill. ISBN 90-04-13146-9.
- Topley, Marjorie (2011). Cantonese Society in Hong Kong and Singapore: Gender, Religion, Medicine and Money. Hong Kong University Press. ISBN 988-8028-14-6.
- William, T. Rowe (1992). Hankow: Conflict and Community in a Chinese City, 1796–1895. Stanford University Press. ISBN 0-8047-2160-2.
- Zhuo, Xinping (2017). Religious Faith of the Chinese. China Insights. Springer. doi:10.1007/978-981-10-6379-4. ISBN 978-981-10-6378-7.
