= Xu Chuanyin =

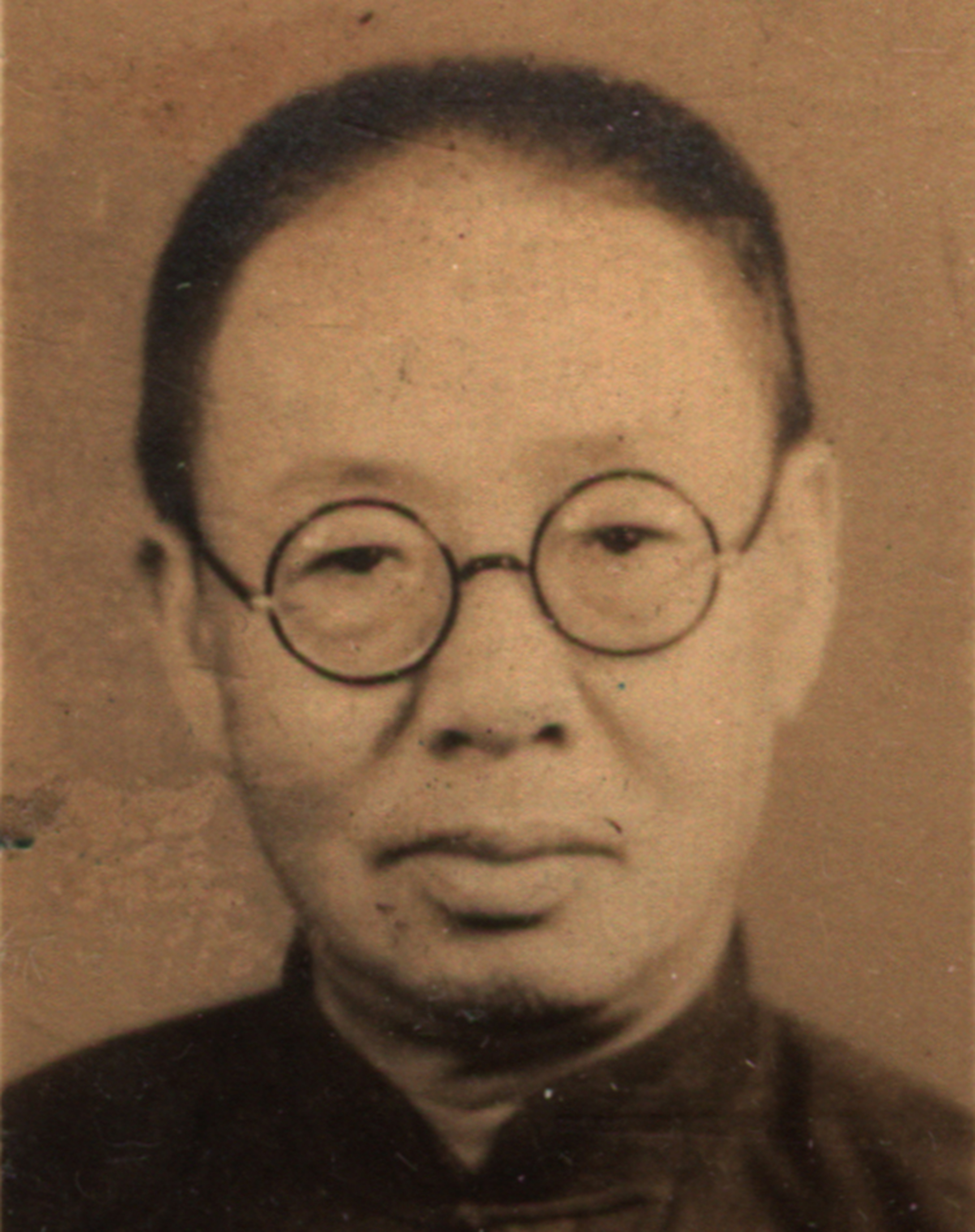
Xu Chuanyin

Xu Chuanyin (Chinese: 许传音, November 23, 1884 – September 24, 1971), or Hsu Tsuan-ing, hailed from Guichi, Anhui Province. During the Nanjing Massacre, he served as a member of the International Committee for the Nanjing Safety Zone and held the position of vice president of the Nanjing branch of the World Red Swastika Society.

== Biography ==
Xu journeyed to Nanjing in 1897 to further his education and obtained a bachelor's degree in agriculture from Nanking University in 1905. Following graduation, he remained in the school to teach and obtained a master's degree from Jinling University in 1915. In that year, he was funded by the Boxer Indemnities to pursue his studies at the University of Illinois Urbana-Champaign, where he obtained a Ph.D. in economics in 1917. He returned to Beijing in 1919 to serve in the Ministry of Railways of the Beiyang government and relocated to Nanjing in 1928 to work in the Ministry of Railways of the Republic of China.

During the Nanjing Massacre, he was appointed as the head of the Housing Committee of the International Committee for the Nanking Safety Zone, overseeing housing arrangements for evacuees and documenting Japanese atrocities. Due to his fluency in English, he was appointed as the vice president of the Nanjing branch of the World Red Swastika Society to facilitate communication with foreigners and assist in the burial of bodies. In early 1938, he assumed the role of advisor to the "Nanjing Municipal Autonomy Committee" to enhance support for the refugees. After the forced dissolution of the Safety Zone, he became a member of the International Relief Committee of the Nanjing Refugee Zone. Subsequent to 1945, he assumed the role of deputy director at Gulou Hospital. In 1946, he traveled to Tokyo to provide testimony in the International Military Tribunal for the Far East. During the 1947 trial of Hisao Tani, he aided in exhuming the skeletons from the mass graves and provided testimony in court.

Post-1949, Xu Chuanyin faced a challenging life due to his role in the Japanese Army's puppet committee (i.e. "Nanjing Municipal Autonomy Committee") and succumbed to shock. He was interred in the Huangjinshan Cemetery and subsequently relocated to the Yuhuatai Gongdeyuan Cemetery (Chinese: 雨花台功德园).
