= Huang Dehui =

Founder of Xiantiandao

- 黃德輝

Personal life
- Born: 1684 Taiyuan, Shanxi, Qing Dynasty
- Died: 1750 (age 66)
- Known for: 9th Patriarch of Xian Tian Dao and Yiguandao
- Other names: Yang Mingchi, Huang Jiuzu, Huang Tingchen, Qiaowan Xianshi

Religious life
- Religion: Xiantiandao
- Sect: Xiantiandao

Senior posting
- Predecessor: Luo Weiqun
- Successor: Wu Zixiang
- Reincarnation: Yuanshi Tianzun

Huang Dehui (Chinese: 黃德輝; pinyin: Huángdéhuī) is the founder of the Green Lotus sect (青蓮教) or also known as Xiantiandao (先天教). He is recognized as the 9th patriarch in the lineage of patriarchs of the Xiantiandao and Yiguandao and is an important figure who created and shaped the foundations of the doctrines and teachings.

== Early life ==
Huang was born on the 8th day of the 2nd month of 1684 in the Kangxi period of the Qing Dynasty. He was from Rao Prefecture, Poyang County, Jiangxi. He was originally a Taoist Quanzhen monk, who later joined the followers of Luo Weiqun (羅蔚群).

== Religious career ==
One branch of Luoism is Yuandun Jiao (圆顿教), founded by Zhang Hao (张豪) of Zhili. It was introduced to Jiangxi in the sixth year of Kangxi (1667) by Luo Weixing (罗维行) or Luo Weiqun (羅蔚群) of Zhili. Luo Weixing is known in Xiantiandao and Yiguandao lineage as the 8th patriarch. Luo Weixing had a successor named Huang Dehui. (Note: In the Yiguandao 道派源流, it is mentioned that in 1662, in Lushan, patriarch Huang claimed to have received a Tao transmission from the spirit of patriarch Luo through telepathy. The Luo patriarch referred to in this text is Luo Menghong, the founder of Luoism. Meanwhile, according to the historical archives presented by Ma Xisha in his book, Luo Weiqun is a descendant of Luo Menghong and they are two different people.)

Then he created and organized a complete system of doctrines, Buddhist halls, and ritesand wrote the Huangji jindan (皇極金蛋) based on “The Treasure Scroll of the Emperor's Supreme Golden Elixir, the Nine Lotuses and the Correct Belief in the Truth, and the Return to Heaven” (皇极金丹九莲正信归真还乡宝卷) or Jiulian Baojuan (九莲宝卷) for short, a classic work that describes the existence of a secret jewel for returning to heaven and contains a detailed explanation of the msyterious door (玄關). This book, which is the central scripture of Xiantiandao, also explains the theory of three-sun eschatology. Some historians think that the contents of this book originated from Jiulianjing (九蓮經) used by the Mahayana sect (大乘教) led by Wang Sen's family because of the similarity in the content of its teachings. In addition, Huang also wrote the Basic Ritual (礼本), Repentance Script (愿懺), the Pledge (愿忏), the Lightning Sutra (雷经), the Om Sutra (唵经) which became the basis and standard reference for the future development of the Xiantiandao group.

Huang's teachings are based on a mixture of Luo teachings and other popular religious traditions circulating in southern China. As is commonly the case with leaders of sects banned by the government, Huang is known by many different names, one of which is Huang Tingchen (黃廷臣) and Qiaowan Xianshi (橋灣仙師). Huang propagated the doctrine that in order to survive the final apocalypse and return to home, he had specially opened the global initiation mission to save human from misery.

In the Yiguandao book, Huang Dehui is designated as the 9th patriarch and is believed to be an incarnation of Yuanshi Tianzun (元始天尊).

== Death and Afterward ==
He was executed in 1690 by Qing government.

== See also ==
- Xiantiandao
- Yiguandao
- Luo Teaching

== Sources ==
- Ma, Xisha; Huiying Meng (2011), Popular Religion and Shamanism, Brill, ISBN 978-9004174559
- Seiwert, Hubert Michael (2003), Popular Religious Movements and Heterodox Sects in Chinese History, Brill, ISBN 9004131469
- Jones, Charles B (1999), Buddhism In Taiwan Religion And The State 1660-1990, Univ of Hawaii Pr, ISBN 0824820614
- Antony, Robert J. (2023), Rats, Cats, Rogues, and Heroes: Glimpses of China's Hidden Past, Rowman & Littlefield Publishers, ISBN 9781538169346
