= Guiyidao =

Chinese salvationist folk religious movement

Way of the Return to the One 皈依道 Guīyīdào
- Type: Way of Former Heaven sect
- Classification: Chinese salvationist religion
- Founder: Liu Shoji
- Origin: 1916; Shandong
- Members: 1937: 7–10 million
- Other names: Daodeshe, Guiyi Daoyuan, Daoyuan, Precosmic Salvationism

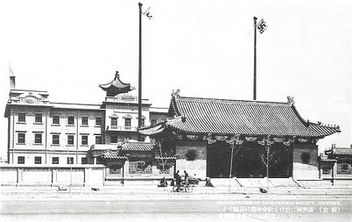
Red Swastika's headquarters of Manchuria (before 1949).

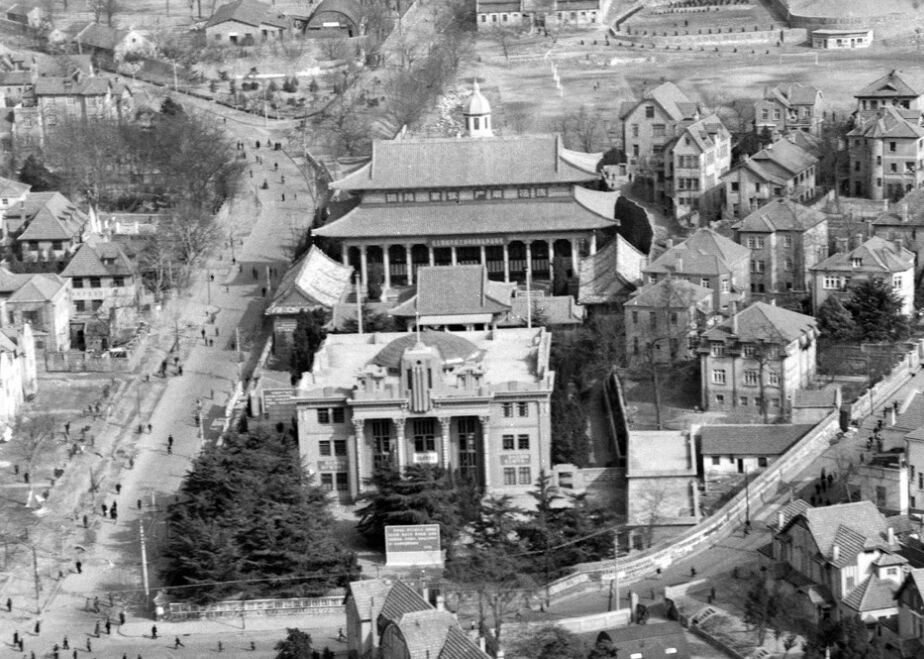
The original headquarters of Guiyidao in Qingdao, Shandong (c. 1950).

Guiyidao (Note: Chinese: 皈依道; lit. 'Way of the Return to the One') is a Chinese folk religious movement of salvation belonging to the Xiantiandao ("Way of Former Heaven") tradition. It is better known as Precosmic Salvationism (Note: Chinese: 先天救教; pinyin: Xiāntiān jiùjiào; lit. 'Former Heaven Salvationism') in contemporary Taiwan, and historically also known by the name of its institutions as Daodeshe, (Note: Chinese: 道德社; lit. 'Community of the Way and its Virtue') Guiyi Daoyuan (Note: Chinese: 皈依道院; lit. 'School of the Way of the Return to the One') or later Daoyuan. (Note: Chinese: 道院; lit. 'School of the Way')

Similarly to other Xiantiandao sects, Guiyidao is focused on the worship of the universal God (Tian), which it defines as the Holiest Venerable Patriarch of the Primordial Heaven (Zhisheng Xiantian Laozu), as the source of salvation.

Guiyidao is related to the Japanese Shinto sect of Oomoto (大本 "Great Source") and is a proscribed religion in the People's Republic of China, thereafter being active as an underground church. The charitable branch of Daoyuan is known as the Red Swastika Society (世界红卍字会 Hóngwànzìhuì).

== History ==
Guiyidao was founded in 1916 in the Pin County of Shandong as a fuji group. It was led by Liu Shoji (劉紹基). The following year the association moved to the provincial capital Jinan where it interacted with the Tongshanshe, another Xiantiandao sect. Adopting the organisation structure and meditation techniques of the Tongshanshe, the Guiyi Daoyuan was created in 1921.

The association formally established itself in Beijing with the support of premier Xiong Xiling (1870–1937, premier in 1913–14) and the American Christian missionary Gilbert Reid, and between 1922 and 1928 it expanded throughout China. The Daoyuan also set up a nationwide charity organisation, the Red Swastika Society (世界红卍字会 Hóngwànzìhuì), which was China's largest relief organisation during the Sino-Japanese War.

The Daoyuan had a separate organisational structure managed by and for women, which oversaw their religious activity, education and child care, both affirming traditional virtues and valorising women's public service. Western missionaries were fascinated by Daoyuan, which drew members among the Christians, given its inclusion and interpretation of Jesus' teaching.

In 1928, the Republic of China banned the Daoyuan, among other redemptive societies. It then sought to re-brand itself as a charitable body, relying on the reputation of its World Red Swastika Society charitable branch.

Reports of Guiyidao-Red Swastika strength during the 1920s and 1930s seem to vary widely, with citations of 30,000 "members" in 1927 to 7–10 million "followers" in 1937.

=== Japanese developments ===
After an earthquake in Japan in 1923, a Guiyidao relief mission was sent there, leading to the creation of a Japanese branch of the sect and ties with Shinto sects given the strong resonance of their beliefs. The first president of Japanese Daoyuan was Deguchi Onisaburo (1871–1948), the cofounder of the Oomoto (大本 "Great Source") Shinto sect.

Other members included Ueshiba Morihei (1883–1969), founder of the Aikido style of martial arts; Okada Mokichi (1882–1955), who in 1955 founded the Church of World Messianity; Nakano Yonosuke (1887–1974), founder in 1949 of the Ananai sect of Oomoto; and Goi Masahisa, founder of the White Light sect.

=== After 1949 ===
Suppressed by the communist regime after 1949, Guiyidao has persisted as an underground religion in the People's Republic of China. Branches of the sect are present in Hong Kong, Taiwan, Japan, Malaysia, Singapore, Canada, and the United States of America. Since 1950, the Hong Kong Daoyuan has served as the world headquarters of Guiyidao outside of mainland China.

== The Red Swastika Society ==
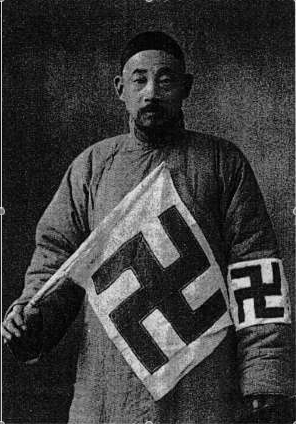
A member of the Red Swastika, circa 1937.

The Red Swastika Society is the philanthropic branch of Guiyi Daoyuan founded in 1922 by Qian Nengxun (錢能訓), Du Bingyin (杜秉寅) and Li Jiabai (李佳白). The establishment of the federation was set up in Beijing together with the organization's president Li JianChiu (李建秋) drawing on Western examples such as the Red Cross to build charitable institutions grounded in Chinese religion. The swastika (卍 wàn; "infinity", "all") in Chinese and other cultures is a symbol of the manifestation of God or its creation.

Red Swastika's mission was a broad based effort of philanthropy and moral education. It ran poorhouses and soup kitchens, as well as modern hospitals and other relief works. It had an explicit international focus, extending relief efforts to Tokyo after earthquakes and also in response to natural disasters in the Soviet Union. In addition, it had offices in Paris, London, and Tokyo and professors of Esperanto within its membership.

Perhaps the best reported event of its history was its role in the Nanking Massacre. The rampage of the occupying Japanese forces through the city left thousands of bodies in the streets, and the Red Swastika stepped in to assist in burials. Records of these activities from the Red Swastika have provided important primary resources for research into the scale of the atrocity and the location of mass graves.

Although it was suppressed during the Maoist rule in mainland China, the Red Swastika continues today as a religious organization focused on charity. It has branches in areas of the Chinese diaspora, with headquarters in Taiwan. Besides charity work, the Red Swastika runs two schools in Hong Kong (Tuen Mun and Tai Po) and one in Singapore (Red Swastika School).

== See also ==
- Chinese folk religion
- Chinese salvationist religions
- Xiantiandao

== General sources ==
- Goossaert, Vincent; David Palmer (2011). The Religious Question in Modern China. University of Chicago Press. ISBN 978-0226005331.
- Munro, Robin; Mickey Spiegel (1994). Detained in China and Tibet: A Directory of Political and Religious Prisoners. Human Rights Watch. ISBN 978-1564321053.
  - List first published in: "Appendix: Sects and Societies Recently or Currently Active in the PRC". Chinese Sociology & Anthropology. 21 (4): 103–104. 1989. doi:10.2753/CSA0009-46252104102.
