= Sungmo =

Sungmo (崇母, "Holy Mother"), also called Daemo ("Great Mother"), Jamo ("Benevolent Mother"), Sinmo ("Divine Mother"), Nogo ("Ancient Lady"), Chungkyun Moju ("Empress Mother of the Rightful View") and by other names, is a mother goddess in Korean shamanism. She is regarded as the mother or daughter of the Heavenly King and, in some myths, as the mother of all shamans. In other myths, the shamans are rather explained as descendants of Dangun.

== Relation to the shamans ==
In a collection of myths, the origin of the shamans is linked to Sungmo, who is associated with a mountain and presented as either the mother or the spiritual daughter of the "Heavenly King". In some myths, she is a mortal princess who is later turned into a goddess. The investiture of the shamans, according to such myths, is believed to pass down through female lineage.

These myths usually tell of a man, Pobu Hwasang, who encountered the "Holy Mother [of the Heavenly King]" on the top of a mountain. The Holy Mother then became a human being and married the man who met her, giving birth to eight girls, the first mudang. According to some scholars, this myth was first elaborated in the Silla period, when Buddhism and influences from China had already penetrated the Korean peninsula.

The myth of the princess is the most popular, and it differs from region to region. In one of the versions, the princess is Ahwang Kongju of the Yao kingdom, located on the Asian mainland. The princess had a strong link with divinity, granting welfare to her people. Her father sent the princess among the people, who began to worship her for her healing powers. The first mudang were established as her successors. The princess is worshipped with seasonal offerings in Chungcheong. The yellow and red clothes worn by the mudang are regarded as Ahwang Kongju's robes.

In the north of the Korean peninsula, the princess is known as Chil Kongju (the "Seventh Princess"), seventh amongst the daughters of the king. The myth tells that she was rejected by her father, who sealed her in a stone coffin and cast it into a pond, but she was rescued by a Dragon King sent by the Heavenly King, and ascended to the western sky becoming the goddess of healing waters. Names of the goddess in other local traditions Pali Kongju and Kongsim. In the tradition of Jeju Island, where there are more male baksu than female mudang, the myth tells of a prince as the ancestor of all shamans.

== See also ==
- Xiwangmu
- Amaterasu
- Muism
