= Yaochidao =

Yaochidao (瑤池道 "Way of the Mother-of-Pearl Lake"), also known by the name of its corporate form the Holy Church of the Mother-of-Pearl Lake, Taiwan Yauchi Holy Church (台灣瑤池聖教會) or by the older name of Cihuitang (慈惠堂 "Church of the Loving Favour"), is a Chinese folk religious sect related to the Xiantiandao lineage, with a strong following in Taiwan and active as an underground church in the People's Republic of China, where it is theoretically a proscribed sect.

It existed before the 20th century and it is focused on the worship of Xiwangmu (the "Queen Mother of the West").

== Practices ==
Members of Yaochidao wear blue uniforms and perform a variety of rituals and practices, including the divination of inspired scriptures, chanting of scriptures, exercises of body cultivation, gods' mediumship, and other forms of charismatic religious praxis.

== See also ==
- Chinese salvationist religions
- Chinese folk religion

== Sources ==
- Munro, Robin; Mickey Spiegel (1994). Detained in China and Tibet: A Directory of Political and Religious Prisoners. Human Rights Watch. ISBN 1564321053.
