= Lake Heihai =

Lake in Qinghai, China

- 黑海 (Chinese)
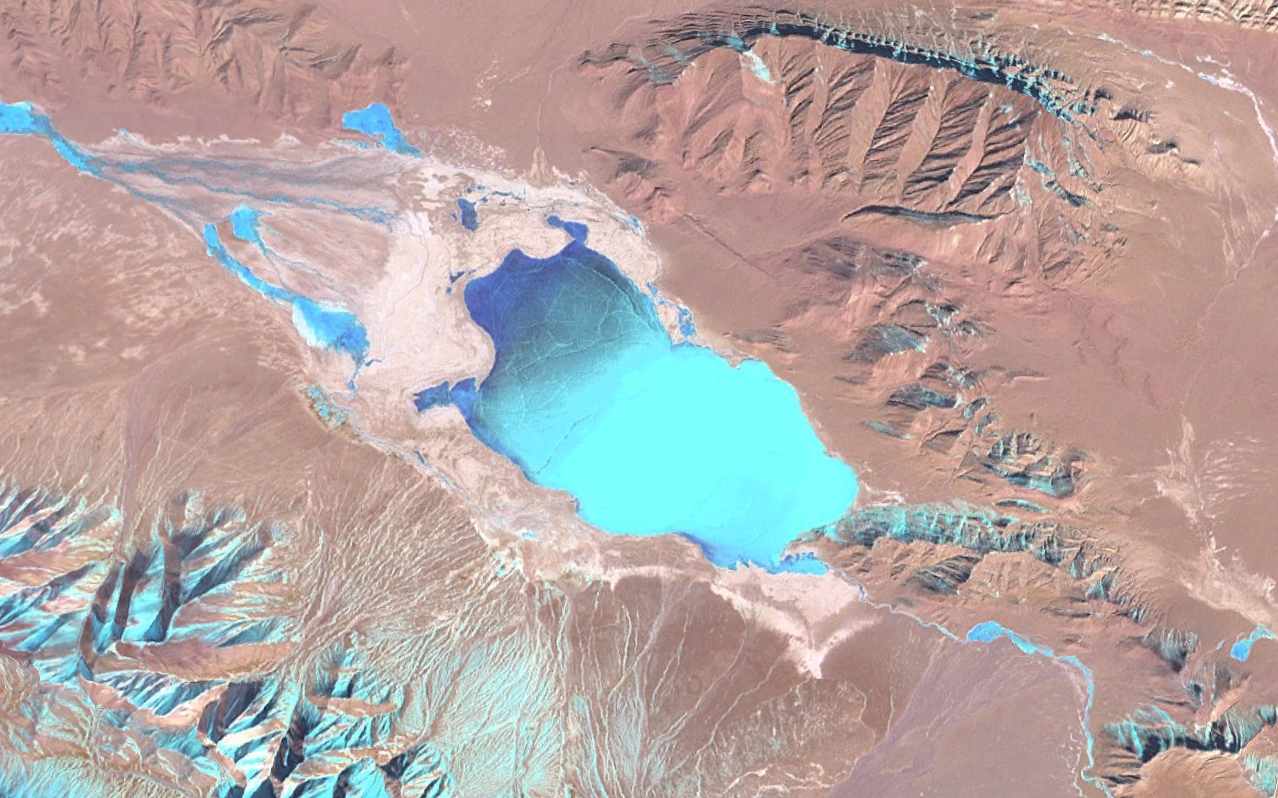
- False-color satellite photograph of Lake Heihai

- Location of Lake Heihai in Qinghai
- Location: Golmud County; Haixi Prefecture; Qinghai Province; China
- Coordinates: 36°00′00″N 93°15′00″E
- Etymology: "Black Sea"
- Primary outflows: Kunlun River
- Catchment area: 1,600 km^{2} (620 sq mi)
- Max. length: 12 km (7.5 mi)
- Max. width: 5 km (3 mi)
- Surface area: 38.3 km^{2} (14.8 sq mi)
- Max. depth: 22.5 m (74 ft)
- Salinity: Mesohaline
- Surface elevation: 4,420–4,446 m (14,501–14,587 ft)

Lake Heihai
- Chinese: 黑海
- Literal meaning: Black Sea; Dark Sea
Transcriptions
Standard Mandarin
- Hanyu Pinyin: Hēi Hǎi
- Wade–Giles: Hei Hai

Alternative names
- Traditional Chinese: 西王母瑤池
- Simplified Chinese: 西王母瑶池
- Literal meaning: The Jade Pond of the Queen Mother of the West
Transcriptions
Standard Mandarin
- Hanyu Pinyin: Xīwángmǔ Yáochí
- Wade–Giles: Hsi Wang Mu Yao Ch'i; Hsi-wang-mu-yao-ch'i

Lake Heihai is a small mesosaline lake in Golmud County, Haixi Prefecture, Qinghai Province, in western China.

== Names ==
"Lake Heihai" is an English clarification of the pinyin romanization of the Chinese name Hēi Hǎi, meaning "Black Sea". (As with Qinghai Lake, the Chinese word for "sea" is sometimes used to translate the Mongolian naɣur (ᠨᠠᠭᠤᠷ), which was once used ambiguously for all large bodies of water.) The lake is also known as Xīwángmǔ Yáochí ("Jade Pond of the Queen Mother of the West") from an old legendary location in the Kunlun Mountains and sometimes confused with Lake Hala in the Qilian Mountains.

== Geography ==
Lake Heihai is located about 200 km (120 mi) south of the city of Golmud in Golmud County, Haixi Prefecture, Qinghai Province, at an elevation of 4,420 m (14,500 ft) or 4,446 m (14,587 ft) above sea level in western China. It lies in a valley roughly 50 km (31 mi) long and 15 km (9 mi) wide between the Kunlun Mountains (highest elevation about 5,700 m or 18,700 ft) to the south and the Burhan Buda (highest elevation about 5,400 m or 17,700 ft) to the north. Earthquakes are common, as the lake lies near the major 1,600 km (990 mi) long Kunlun Fault.

Covering 38.3 km^{2} (14.8 sq mi), it stretches about 12 km (7.5 mi) from east to west and 5 km (3 mi) north to south. The deepest point is around 22.5 m (74 ft) below its surface. Two main streams feed into the lake, with a catchment of around 1,600 km^{2} (620 sq mi). Meltwater flows from two small glaciated areas in the Kunluns. The west is about 38 km^{2} (15 sq mi), the east about 24 km^{2} (9.3 sq mi); both appear to have retreated roughly 100 m (330 ft) since 1970. The outflow to the east is the source of the Kunlun River, the upper stretch of the Golmud River.

With mean annual precipitation of 250 mm (10 in) and high evaporation rates, the lake's water is mesohaline. The mean annual temperature is −8 °C (18 °F), so much of the surrounding countryside is permafrost alpine grassland, supporting dwarf cinquefoil and winterfat shrubs and sparse sedges and grasses. Polygonum sibiricum occupies moist saline sites close to the lake; drier land further from shore is characterized by Kobresia robusta on the sandier north side and Poa pachyantha on the south side.

== History ==
During the Pleistocene, sediment from glaciers in the Kunlun temporarily blocked outflow of the valley's main meltwater stream, forming the present lake. Particularly strong winds weathered and shaped the surrounding rocks from 100–80,000 years ago. At its maximum extent, an Ice Age glacier filled most of the present valley, which increased its catchment about 200 km^{2} (77 sq mi). At times, probably around 50 kya, 13 kya, and 11.6 kya, Lake Heihai overflowed the present 10 m (33 ft) elevation difference to join with the smaller lake to its west, increasing its catchment by another 230 km^{2} (89 sq mi) and leaving lacustrine sediments across 28 km^{2} (11 sq mi) of now-dry land. During the mid-Holocene, from around 8–4,000 years ago, the climate was wetter and warmer, possibly from increased influence from the Indian or East Asian monsoon. By the late Holocene, the monsoon was no longer able to reach the lake and its environment became drier and windier again.

== Culture ==
As the largest present lake in the Kunlun Mountains, it has become identified with the "Jade Pond" (also translated as the "Nacre" or "Turquoise Pond" and "Lake of Gems") important in various myths involving the Queen Mother of the West. Lake Heihai has a stone temple to the Queen Mother and a large slab reading "Xiwangmu Yaochi" (西王母瑤池).

== See also ==
- List of lakes in China
