= Dragon Flower Church of the Heart-bound Heavenly Way =

Dragon Flower Church of the Heart-bound Heavenly Way 一心天道龙华会 Yīxīn tiāndào lónghuá huì
- Type: Way of Former Heaven lineage sect
- Classification: Chinese salvationist religion
- Founder: Ma Shiwei
- Origin: 1913; Zouping County, Shandong
- Other name(s): One-Heart Church, Black Church (黑会 Hēi huì), Church of the Ninety-nine Returning to One (九九归一会 Jiǔjiǔguīyī huǐ), Ancient Honesty Church (古敦会 Gǔdūn huì), and others

The Holy Dragon Flower Church of the Heart-bound Heavenly Way (一心天道龙华圣教会 Yīxīn tiāndào lónghuá shèng jiàohuì), also known simply as Yixin Tiandao (一心天道 "Heart-bound Heavenly Way"), Yizhendao (一真道 "Way of the One Truth") or the Holy Church of the One Truth (一真圣教会 Yīzhēn shèng jiàohuì), or Changmaodao (长毛道 "Way of the Long Hair"), is a Chinese folk religious sect part of the Xiantiandao tradition.

The first hall of the religion (一心堂 yīxīn táng, "one-heart hall") was founded in 1913 by Ma Shiwei (马士伟) in the Zouping County of Shandong.

In 1917 the One-Heart movement expanded opening a branch in Shanxi, and in 1922 it started a branch in Hebei. Its headquarters were located in Wutai County (Shanxi) and Jinan (Shandong). In 1937 the first congregation was established in Shanghai.

== See also ==
- Chinese folk religion
- Chinese salvationist religions
- Xiantiandao

== Sources ==
- Palmer, David A.; Katz, Paul R.; Wang, Chien-chuan (2011). "Redemptive Societies in Cultural and Historical Context" (PDF). Journal of Chinese Theatre, Ritual and Folklore / Minsu Quyi. 173: 1–12.
- DuBois, Thomas David (2011). "The Salvation of Religion? Public Charity and the New Religions of the Early Republic" (PDF). Journal of Chinese Theatre, Ritual and Folklore / Minsu Quyi. 172: 73–126.
