= Queen Mother of the West =

Mother goddess in Chinese religion and mythology

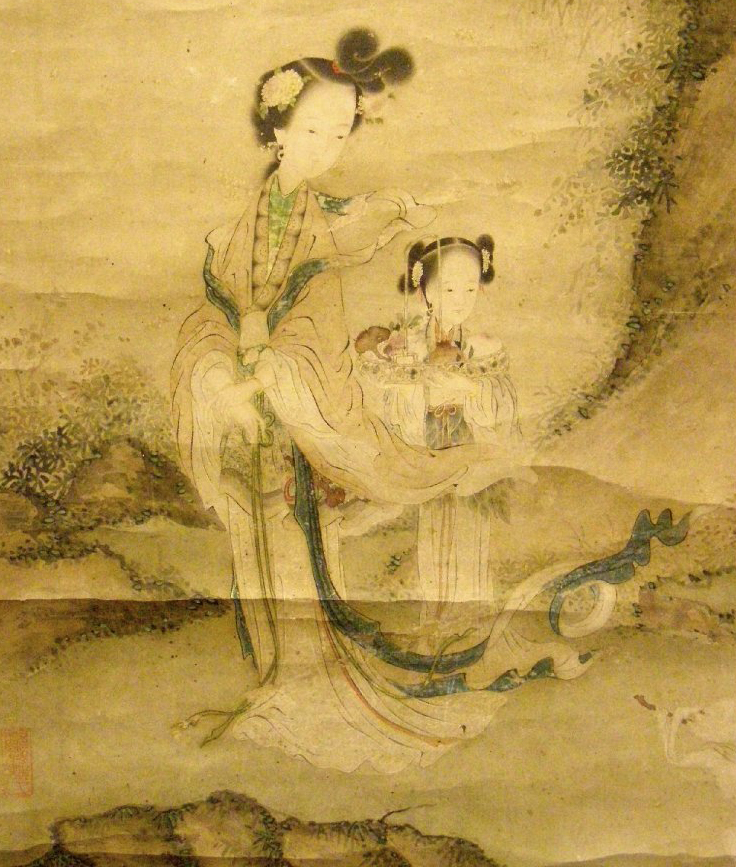
- The Queen Mother of the West in a detail from a painting by Xie Wenli
- Abode: Mount Kunlun, or Tortoise Mountain
- Consort: Jade Emperor, Dongwanggong

Chinese name
- Chinese: 西王母
Transcriptions
Standard Mandarin
- Hanyu Pinyin: Xīwángmǔ
- Wade–Giles: Hsi Wang-mu

Golden Mother of the Jade Pond
- Traditional Chinese: 瑤池金母
- Simplified Chinese: 瑶池金母
Transcriptions
Standard Mandarin
- Hanyu Pinyin: Yáochí Jīnmǔ
- Wade–Giles: Yao-chih Chin-mu

Golden Mother the First Ruler
- Chinese: 金母元君
Transcriptions
Standard Mandarin
- Hanyu Pinyin: Jīnmǔ Yuánjūn

Lady Queen Mother
- Chinese: 王母娘娘
Transcriptions
Standard Mandarin
- Hanyu Pinyin: Wángmǔ Niángniáng
- Wade–Giles: Wang-mu Niang-niang

The Queen Mother of the West, known by various local names, is a mother goddess in Chinese religion and mythology, also worshipped later in neighbouring countries. She is attested from ancient times.

The first historical information on her can be traced back to Shang dynasty oracle bone inscriptions that record sacrifices to a "Western Mother". Even though these inscriptions illustrate that she predates organized Taoism, she is most often associated with Taoism. The growing popularity of the Queen Mother of the West, as well as the beliefs that she was the dispenser of prosperity, longevity, and eternal bliss, took place during Han dynasty, in the 2nd century BCE, when the northern and western parts of China became more accessible through the opening of the Silk Road.

== Names ==
Queen Mother of the West is a calque of Xiwangmu in Chinese sources, Seiōbo in Japan, Seowangmo in Korea, and Tây Vương Mẫu in Vietnam. She has numerous titles, one being Yaochi Jinmu (瑤池金母), the "Golden Mother of the Jade Pond (瑤池)" (also translated "Turquoise Pond"). She is also known in contemporary sources as the Lady Queen Mother.

In Chinese salvationist religions, she is believed to be the same being as their main deity, Wusheng Laomu (Chinese: 無生老母; lit. 'unborn old mother'), also known as Wujimu (無極母; lit. 'infinite mother'). The title, Wujimu, signifies the absolute principle of reality, or the creational origin of all things.

Tang writers called her "Golden Mother the First Ruler", the "Golden Mother of Tortoise Mountain", "She of the Nine Numina and the Grand Marvel", and the "Perfected Marvel of the Western Florescence and Ultimate Worthy of the Cavernous Darkness". Commoners and poets of the era referred to her more simply as the "Queen Mother", the "Divine Mother", or simply "Nanny" (Amah).

== Iconography and representation ==
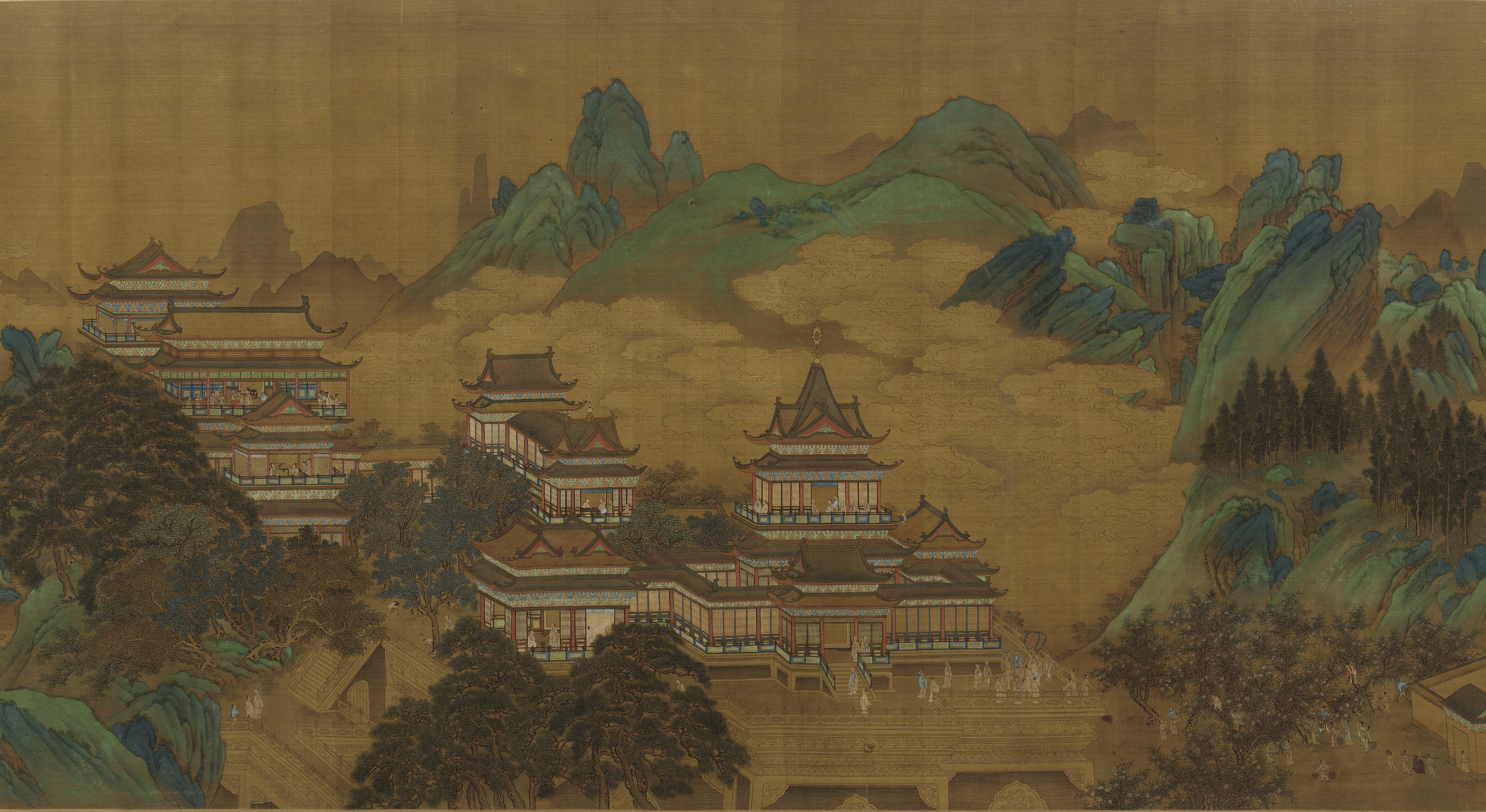
Peach Festival of the Queen Mother of the West, Ming dynasty painting, early 17th century

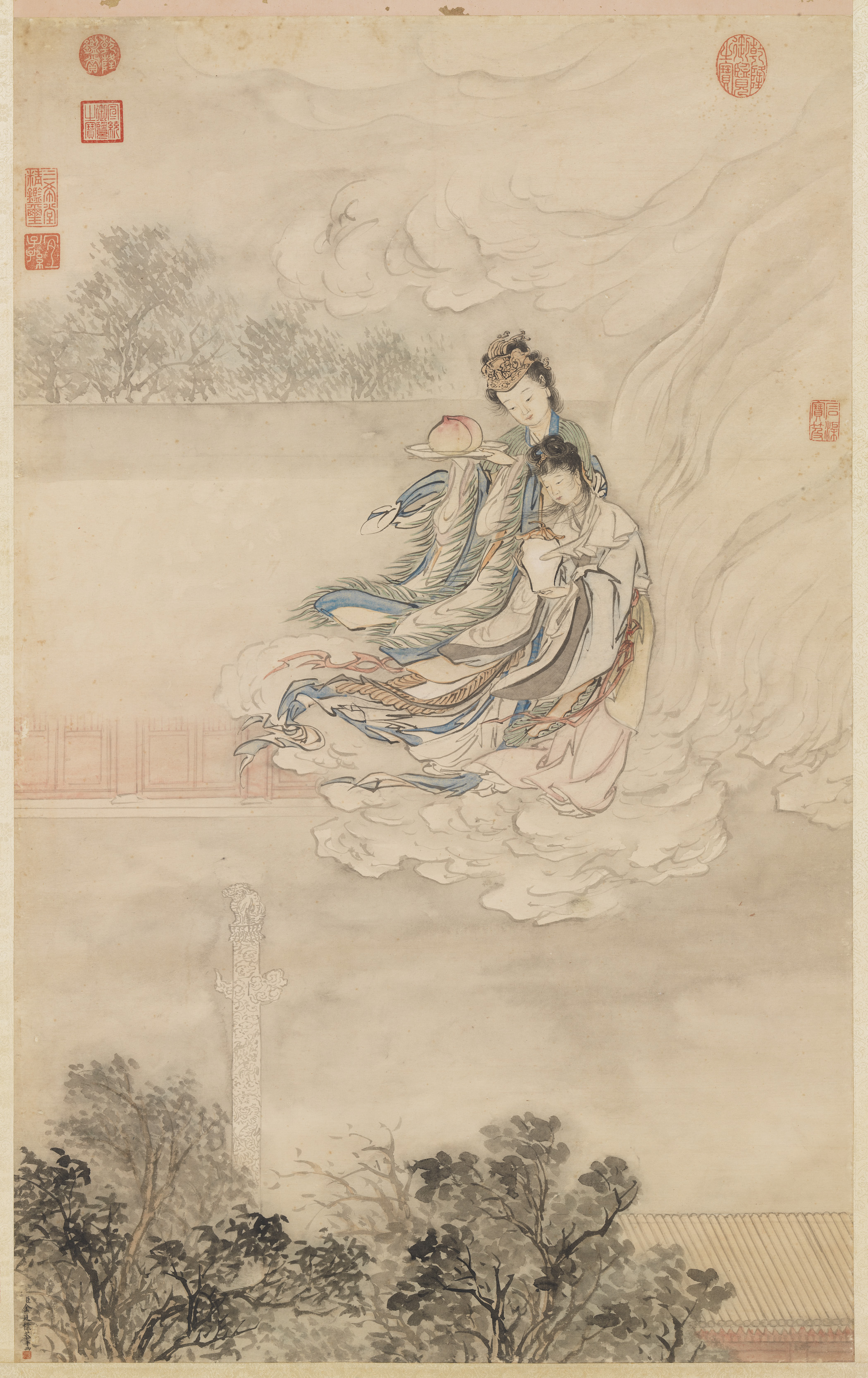
Jade Pond Birthday greeting, by Jin Tingbiao, Qing dynasty

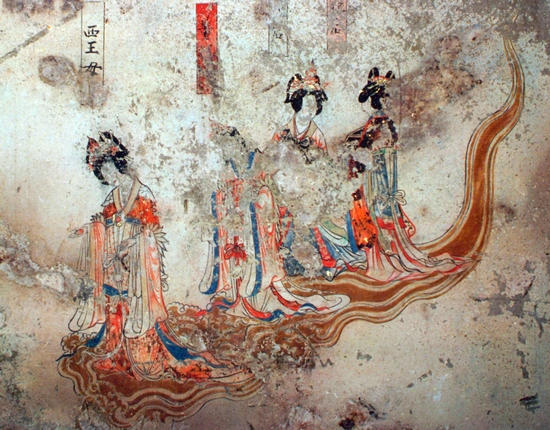
Liao dynasty fresco from the tomb on mount Pao. The first figure from left is Xiwangmu

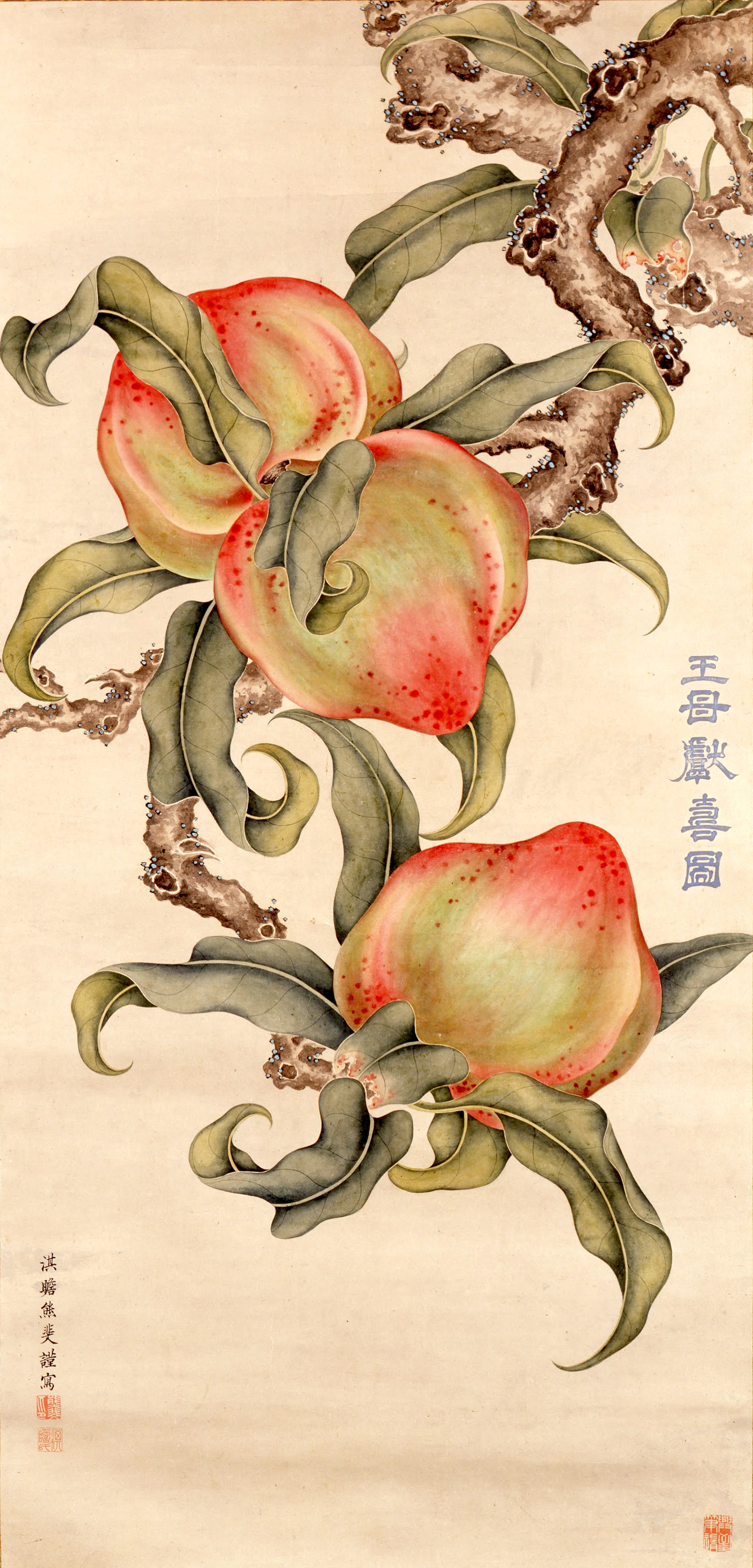
Xiwangmu's Peaches of Immortality, Japanese painting by Kumashiro Yūhi, circa 1750

The Queen Mother of the West is most often depicted holding court within her palace on the mythological Mount Kunlun, usually supposed to be in western China (a modern Mount Kunlun is named after this). Her palace is believed to be a perfect and complete paradise, where it was used as a meeting place for the deities and a cosmic pillar where communications between deities and humans were possible. At her palace she was surrounded by a female retinue of prominent goddesses and spiritual attendants. One of her symbols is the Big Dipper.

Although not definite there are many beliefs that her garden had a special orchard of longevity peaches which would ripen once every three thousand years, others believe though that her court on Mount Kunlun was nearby to the Peach Garden of Immortality. No matter where the peaches were located, the Queen Mother of the West is widely known for serving peaches to her guests, which would then make them immortal. She normally wears a distinctive headdress with the Peaches of Immortality suspended from it.

Flourishing parasols, we reach the chronograms' extremity;
Riding on the mist, I wander to Lofty Whirlwind Peak.
The Lady of the Supreme Primordial descends through jade interior doors;
The Queen Mother opens her Blue-gem Palace.
Celestial people—What a Crowd!
A lofty meeting inside the Cyan Audience Hall.
Arrayed Attendants perform Cloud Songs;
Realized intonations fill the Grand Empty Space.
Every thousand years, her purple crabapple ripens;
Every four kalpas, her numinous melon produces abundantly.
This music differs from that at the feast in the wilderness—
So convivial, and certainly infinite.

— Wu Yun (Complete Tang Poems 1967, line 4942)

Representations of Xiwangmu
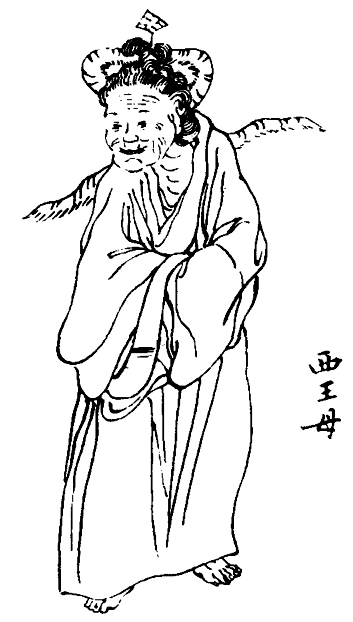
Xi Wangmu in Shanhaijing

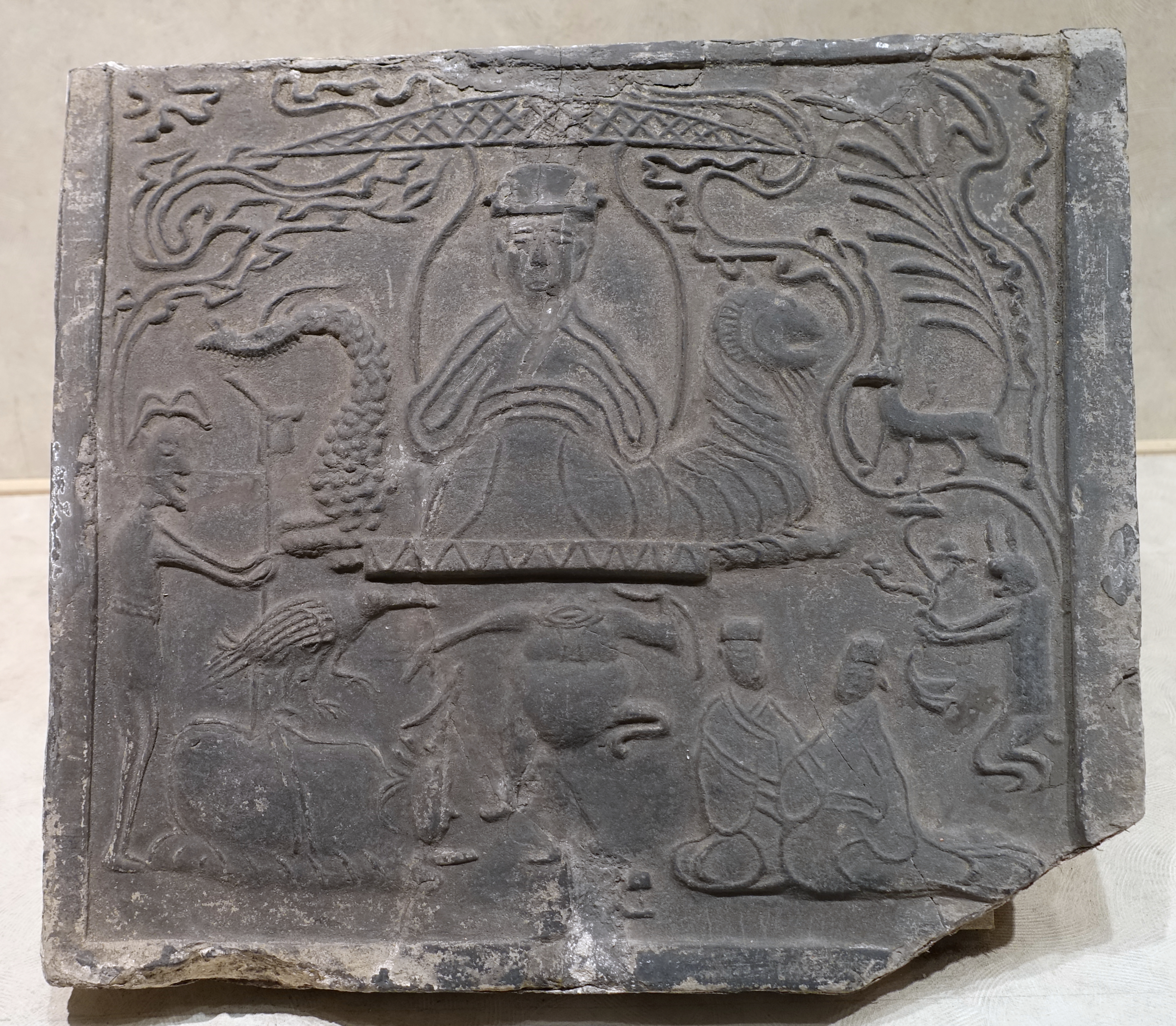
Han Dynasty stone-relief from Sichuan

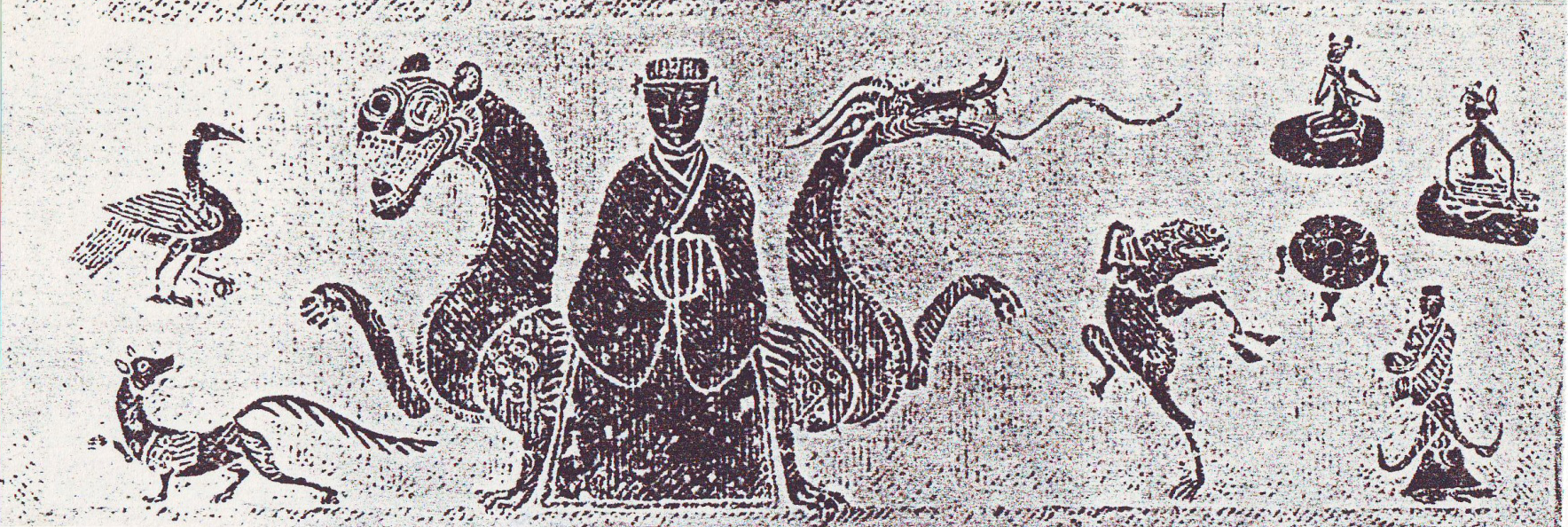
Han Dynasty stone-relief (Xiwangmu sitting in between tiger and dragon)

Xiwangmu in the celestial court, from the murals of Yongle Temple, Yuan dynasty

Xiwangmu from Ming dynasty Imperial Encyclopaedia - Spirits and the Supernatural

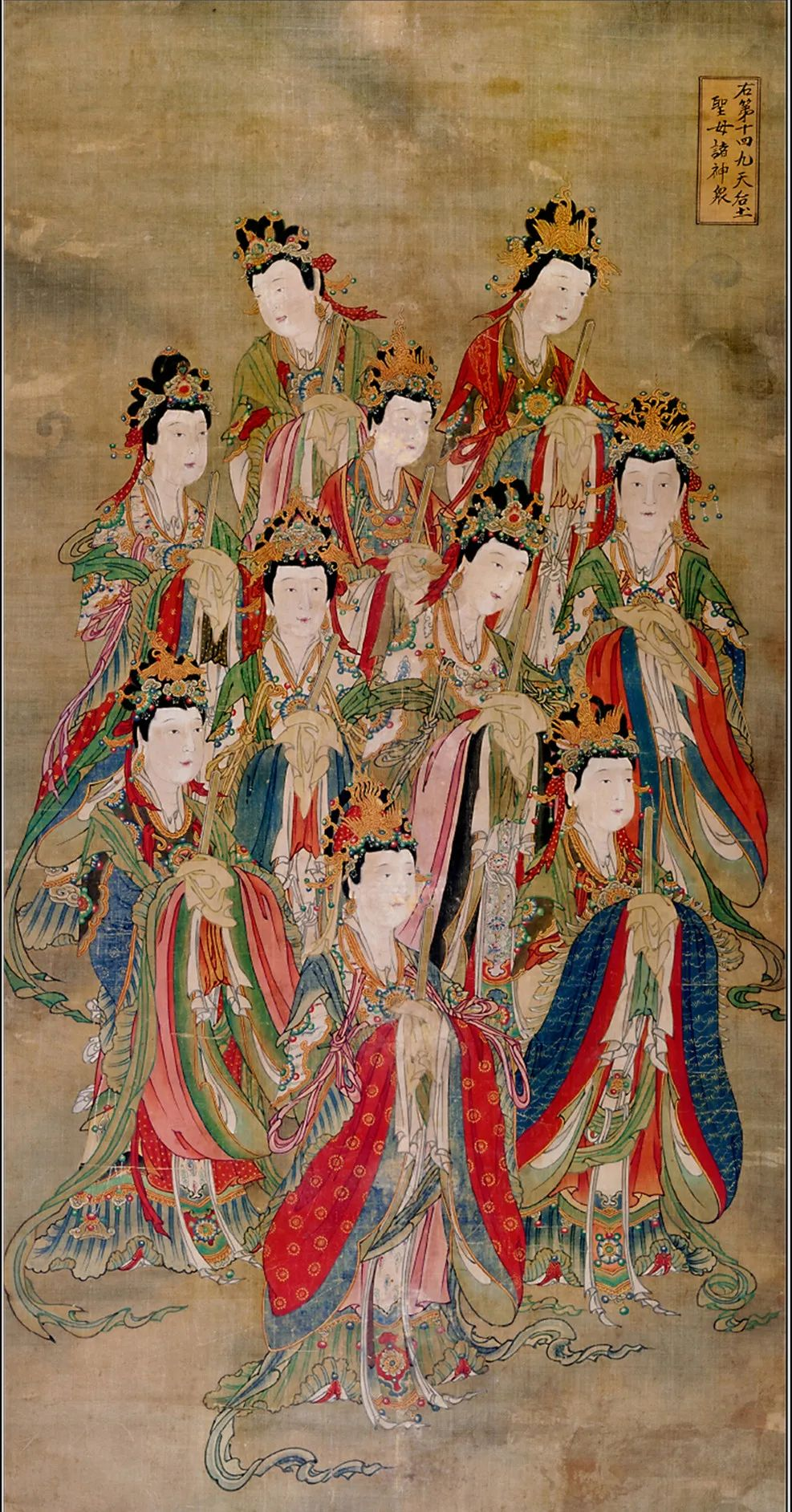
Ming Dynasty Shuilu ritual painting of Xiwangmu with Jiutian, an Houtu from Baoning Temple.

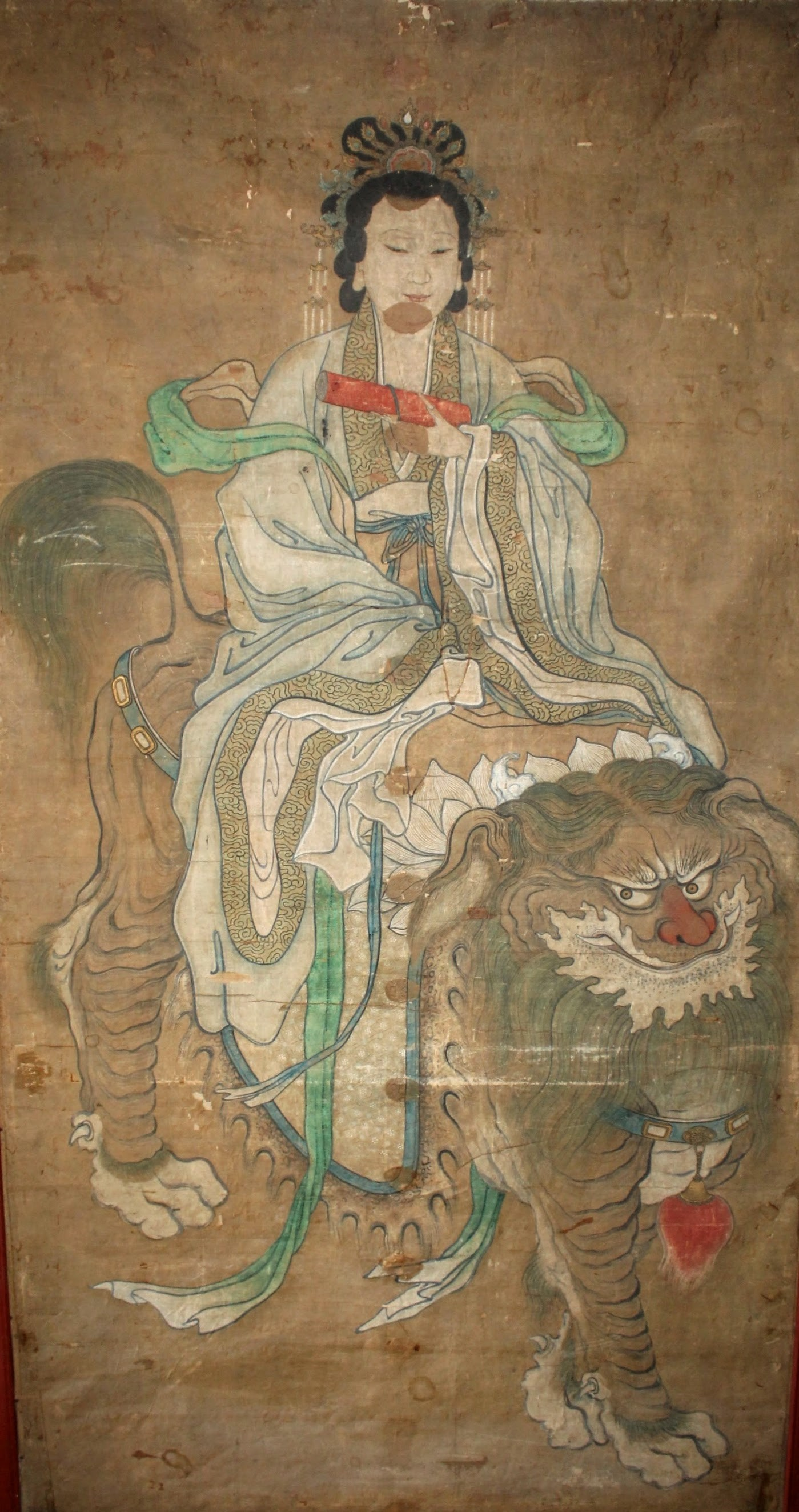
Chinese painting of Xiwangmu riding a foo dog

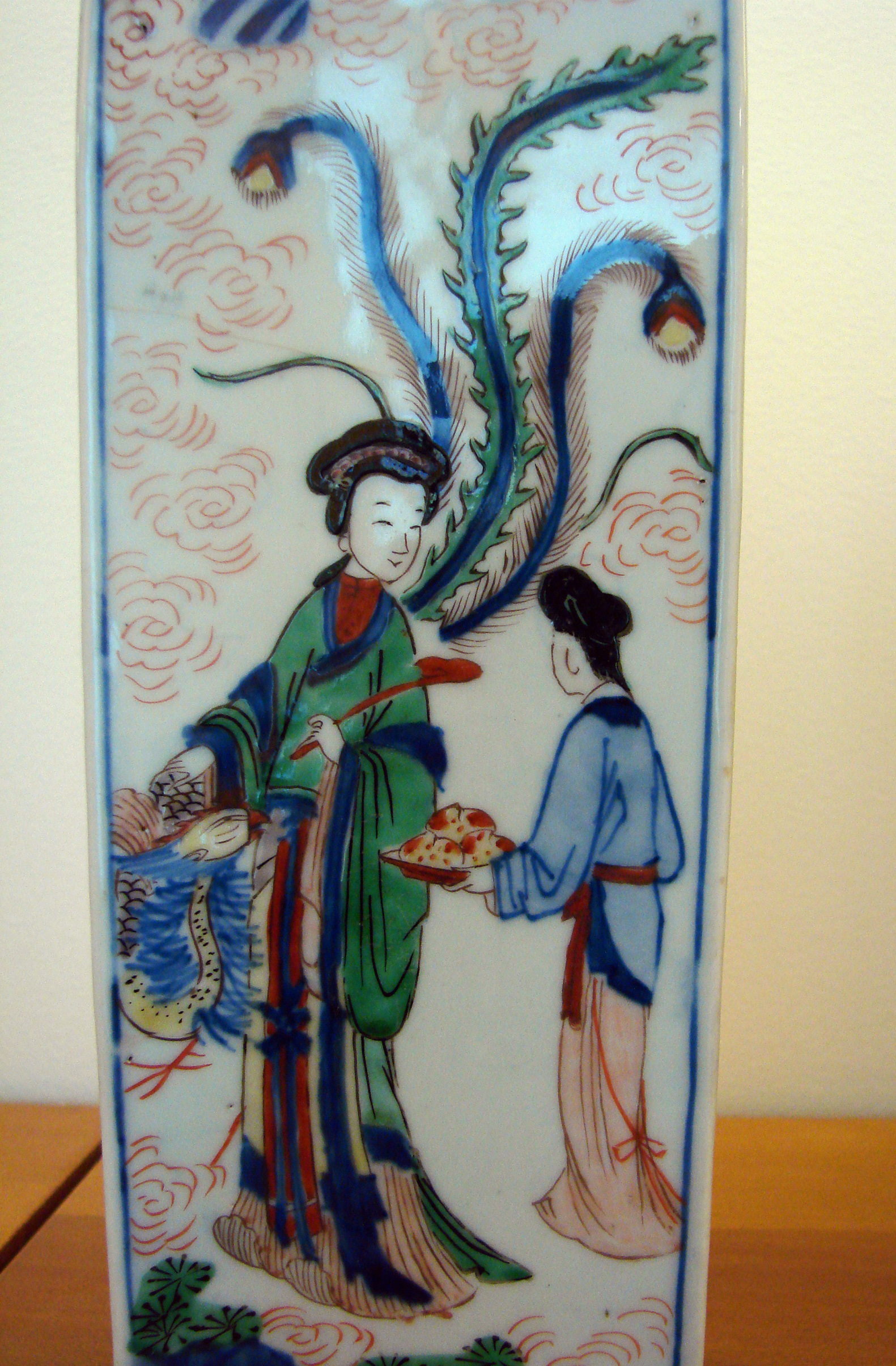
Xiwangmu on porcelain, Qing dynasty

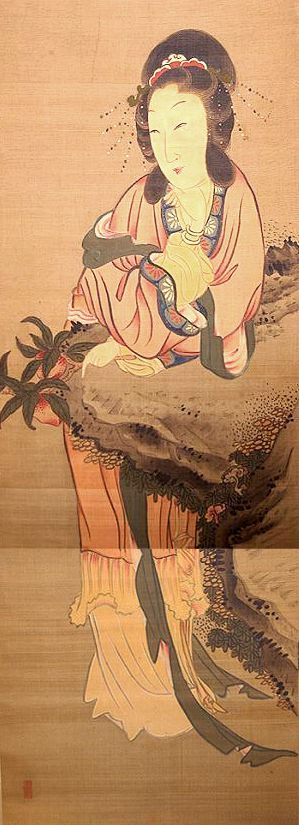
Seiōbo in painting, Japanese

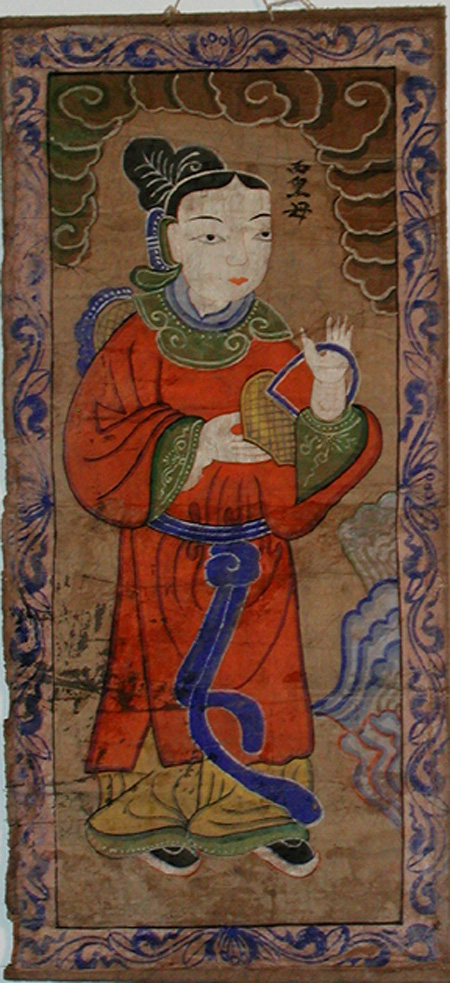
Tây Vương Mẫu on drape, Vietnamese, c. 1800

== History ==
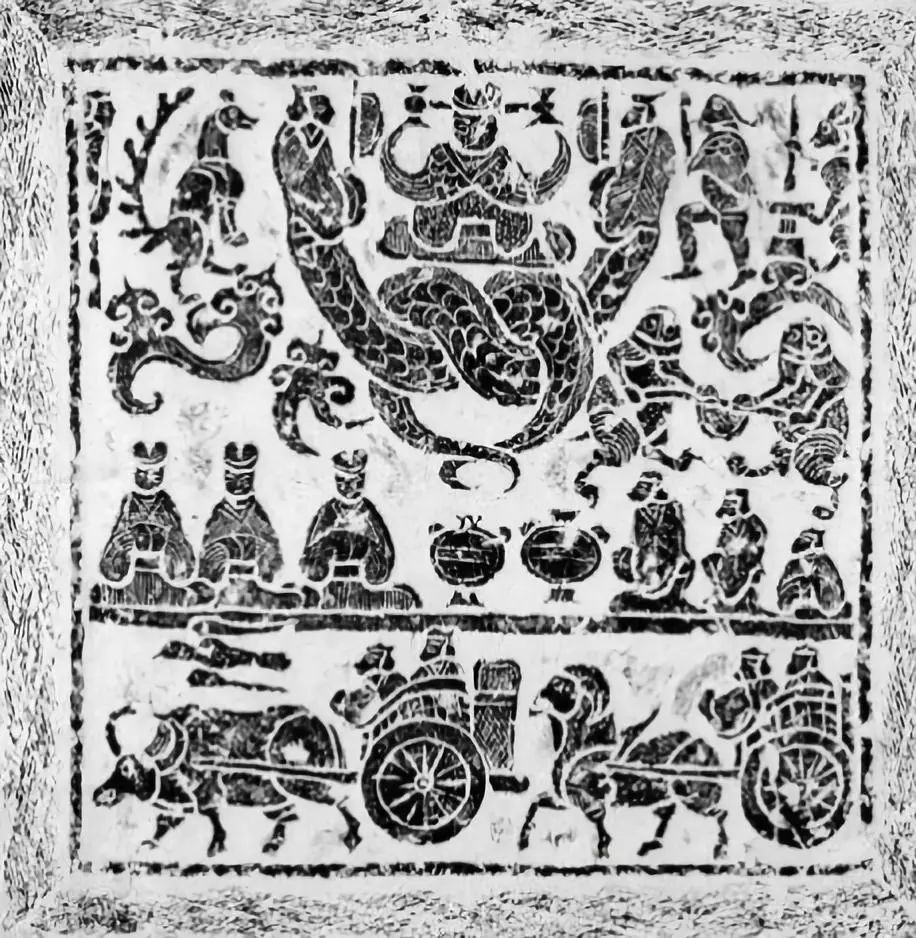
Han Dynasty stone-relief of Xiwangmu found in Tengzhou, Shandong.

The first mentions of the Queen Mother date back to the oracle bone inscriptions of the Shang dynasty (1766–1122 BCE).

One inscription reads:

Crack-making on day IX (9th day), we divined. If we make offering to the eastern mother and the western mother, there will be approval.

Western Mother refers to an archaic divinity residing in the west. The exact nature of the Mother divinities in the Shang dynasty is unclear, but they were seen as powerful forces deserving of ritual by the people of the Shang dynasty.

Originally, from the earliest known depictions of her in accounts like the Classic of Mountains and Seas during the Zhou dynasty, she was a ferocious goddess of death with the teeth of a tiger, who rules over wild beasts and sends down heavenly punishments such as pestilences. She was also mentioned as an authority ruling over other divinities such as Jiutian Xuannü, a goddess of war and sex.

Other stories hold that she is a mountain goddess or a divine tigress. She is also popularly thought to have blessed the Eight Immortals with their supernatural abilities.

After her integration into the Taoist pantheon, she gradually took on associations with other aspects, such as immortality, as well as being the god of stars, directions, profit, and the sun and moon.

The worship of the Queen Mother is organised today in Taiwan as Yaochidao.

== Literary accounts ==
=== Zhuangzi ===
One of the earliest written references to the Queen Mother comes from the writings of the Taoist writer Zhuangzi (c. 4th century BCE):

The Queen Mother of the West obtained it [the Dao] ... and took up her seat at Shao kuang. No one knows her beginning; no one knows her end.

Zhuangzi describes the Queen Mother as one of the highest of the deities, meaning she had gained immortality and celestial powers. Zhuangzi also states that Xiwangmu is seated upon a spiritual western mountain range, suggesting she is connected to not only the heavens, but also to the west.

=== Legendary encounters ===
In Tu Kuang-ting's text, he includes narrative accounts of the Queen Mother's encounters with legendary Chinese heroes. One such account narrates an encounter between the Queen Mother and Laozi (Lord Lao):

In the 25th year of King Chao of the Chou dynasty (1028 BCE) ...

... Lord Lao and the realized person Yin Hsi went traveling ...

... on their behalf, the Queen Mother of the West explicated the Scripture of Constant Purity and Quiet.

In this account, the Queen Mother plays the role of Laozi's superior and is credited with the ultimate authorship of the Dao De Jing. This dichotomy of the Queen Mother as the superior is a characteristic of Shangqing Taoism, a goddess worshiping sect of Taoism of which Tu Kuang-ting was a master. There is also an account of a meeting between the Queen Mother and Laozi in Tang poetry. This account however, being of traditional Taoist thought, has the Queen Mother taking an inferior role to Laozi, calling him "Primordial Lord" (the title of his highest manifestation) and pays homage to the sage.

=== Mythological accounts in the Tang dynasty ===
During the Tang dynasty (June 18, 618 – June 4, 907) poetry flourished throughout China (this period is commonly known as the "Golden age of Chinese poetry"). It was during this period that the Queen Mother became an extremely popular figure in poetry. Her mythology was recorded in the poems of the Complete Tang Poems, a collection of surviving poems (of an estimated 50,000 written during the period) from the Tang dynasty.

After the fall of the Tang dynasty, (c. 910 – c. 920) a Shang-ching Taoist master and court chronicler named Du Guangting wrote a hagiographical biography of the queen mother as part of his text "Yung ch'eng chi hsien lu" ("Records of the Assembled Transcendents of the Fortified Walled City"). This account represents the most complete source of information about Tang society's perceptions of Xiwangmu.

==== Women of the Tang ====
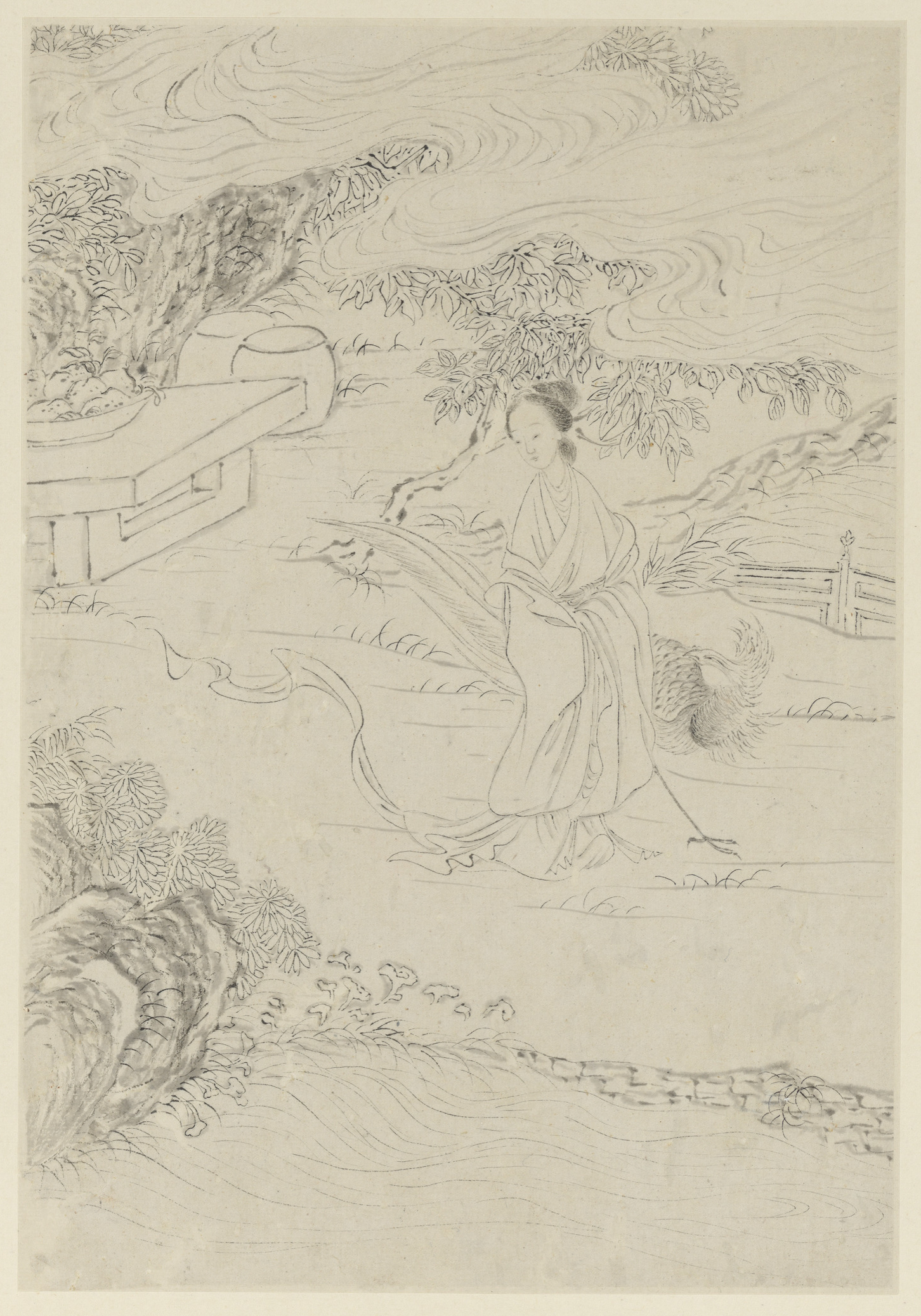
As depicted in the album Famous Women, 1799

Because she was the highest goddess of the Taoist religion and ruler of female Transcendents, The Queen Mother was seen to have had a special relationship with all women. In the beginning section of Tu Kuang-ting's hagiography, he lists the most important functions of the Queen Mother:

In heaven, beneath heaven, in the three worlds, and in the ten directions
all women who ascend to transcendence and attain the way are her dependents.

The Queen Mother of the West was said to care for all woman Daoists in the universe, both perfected and aspirants. Tang writers frequently refer to her in poems about Daoist women. In accordance with the Shang Ch'ing vision expressed by Tu, she appears as teacher judge, registrar, and Guardian of female believers. Her forms reflect Tu's definitions.

The Queen Mother was held in especially high regard by Chinese women who did not represent the societal norm of the submissive woman. To these women, The Queen Mother of the West was seen as "a powerful, independent deity representing the ultimate yin controlling immortality and the afterlife".

=== Description in sectarian scriptures ===
Wusheng Laomu is described in many ways in the scriptures of some Chinese folk religious sects. For instance, an excerpt from the Precious Scripture of the Dragon Flower (c. 1654), pertaining to the Dragon Flower sect, says:

After the emergence of the Ancient Awakened, heaven and earth were established; after the rise of the Eternal Venerable Mother, Former Heaven was established. The Eternal Venerable Mother conceives from herself and begets yin and yang. The yin is the daughter and the yang is the son. Their names are Fuxi and Nüwa respectively.

From another section of the Dragon Flower, "It is required that all male and female members gather with neither difference nor discrimination". Equality of men and women is a characteristic element of the Chinese sectarian tradition, for both males and females are equally children of the Eternal Mother, and both of them are the same in the "Former Heaven", the original state of birth from the goddess.

The aim of every follower of the Wusheng Laomu is to return to her. For example, an excerpt of the "Precious Scroll Explaining the Great Vehicle" says:

After preaching the wonderful message with an enlightened mind and manifested nature, they return home in complete pleasure. ... All children are redeemed and reunited ... and they will resume a long life. They see the Mother sitting on the Lotus Throne, surrounded by golden light. They are received and led to their original place.

In the sect tradition, for example as explained in the "Precious Repentance of Blood Lake" of Hongyangism (弘阳敎), the condition of suffering is inherent to the human being in the world, necessary to creation itself. The material world is likened to a "Blood Lake", filthy and dirty waters that necessarily flow out of women's bodies when a child is born.

== Chinese rulers ==
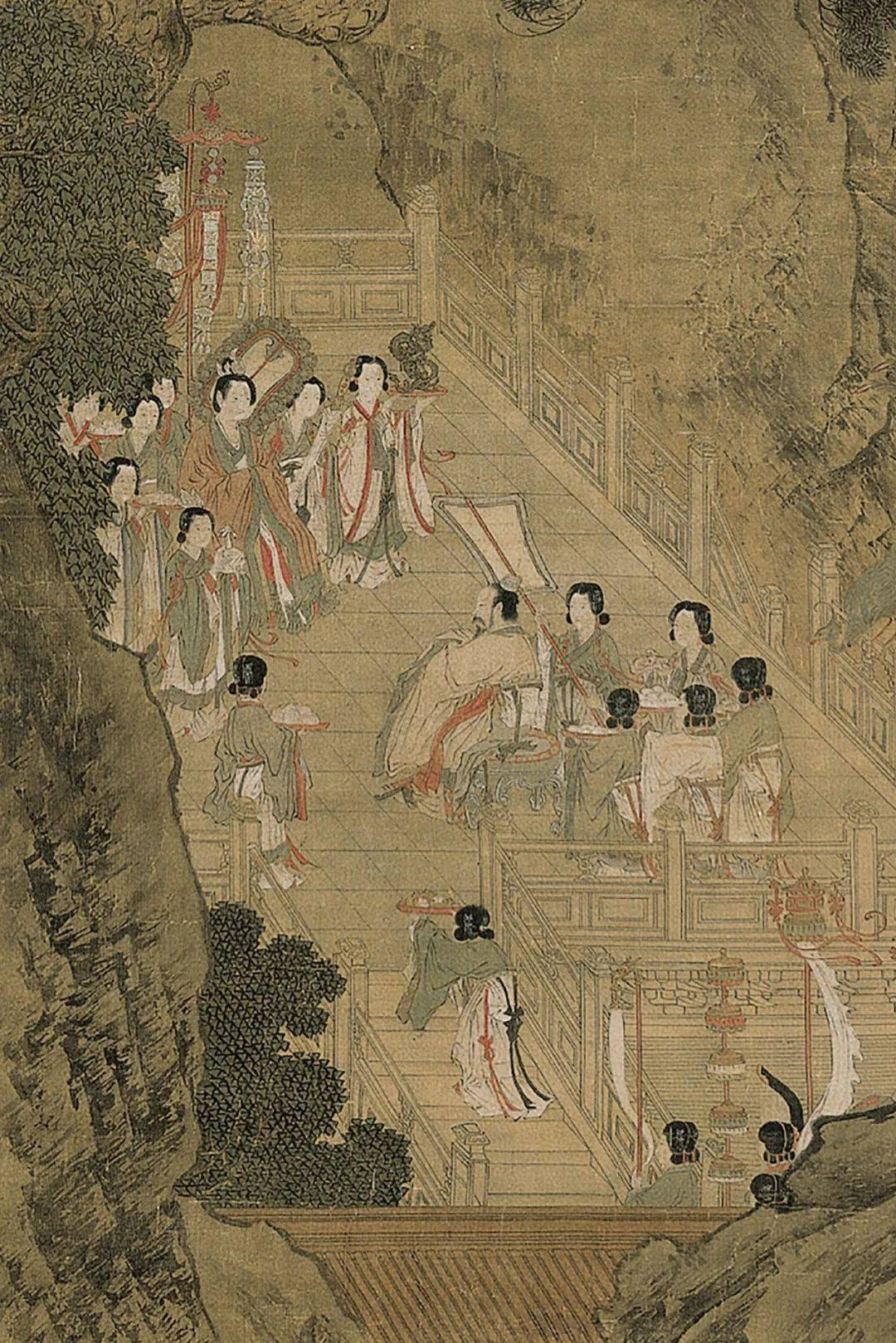
Xiwangmu meeting with a Chinese regent, likely King Mu of Zhou or Emperor Wu of Han

=== Shun ===
The Bamboo Annals record that in the 9th year of reign of the legendary sage king Emperor Shun, "messengers from the western Wang-mu (Queen Mother) came to do him homage." It further notes that "the coming to court from the Western Wang-mu was to present white stone rings and archers' thimbles of gem." Shun's immediate successor was Yu the Great, who was Shun's prime minister and already present in the court at this time.

=== Yu the Great ===
The Xunzi, a 3rd-century BCE classic of statecraft written by Xun Kuang, wrote that "Yu studied with the Queen Mother of the West". This passage refers to Yu the Great, the legendary founder of the Xia dynasty, and posits that the Queen Mother of the West was Yu's teacher. It is believed that she grants Yu both legitimacy, and the right to rule, and the techniques necessary for ruling. The fact that she taught Yu gives her enormous power, since the belief in Chinese thinking is that the teacher automatically surpasses the pupil in seniority and wisdom.

=== King Mu of the Zhou dynasty ===
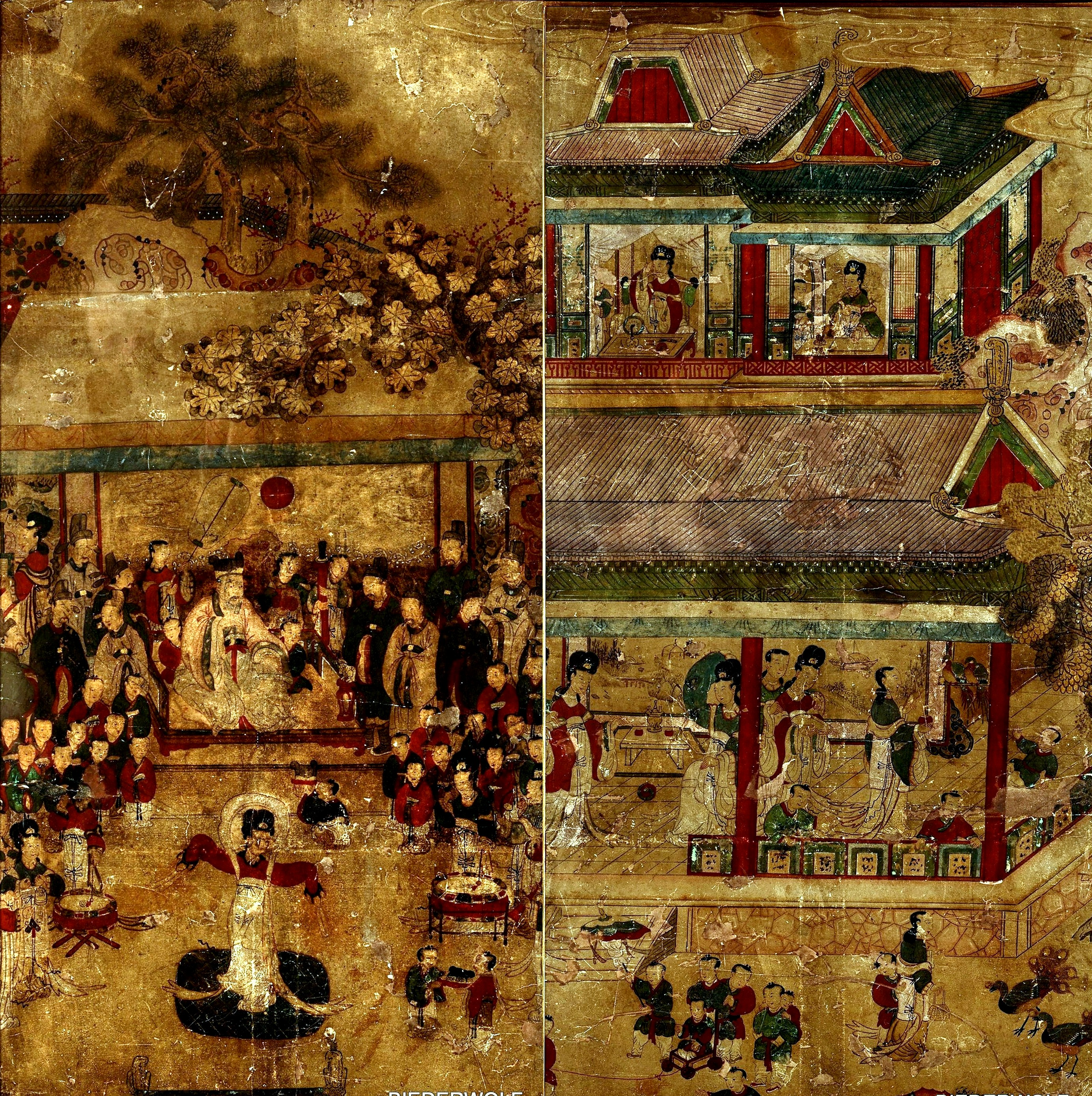
Joseon dynasty Korean painting "Yoji yeondo" (요지연도(瑤池宴圖)), depicting King Mu of Zhou visiting the Queen Mother at the Yaochi (Yoji) in the mythical Kunlun Mountain.

Probably one of the best known stories of contact between a goddess and a mortal ruler is between King Mu of Zhou and the Queen Mother of the West. There are several different accounts of this story but they all agree that King Mu, one of the greatest rulers of the Zhou, set out on a trip with his eight chargers to the far western regions of his empire. As he obtains the eight chargers and has the circuit of his realm, it proves that he has the Mandate of Heaven. On his journey he encounters the Queen Mother of the West on the mythical Mount Kunlun. They then have a love affair, and King Mu, hoping to obtain immortality, gives the Queen Mother important national treasures. In the end he must return to the human realm, and does not receive immortality. The relationship between the Queen Mother of the West and King Mu has been compared to that of a Taoist master and disciple. She passes on secret teachings to him at his request and he, the disciple, fails to benefit, and dies like any other mortal.

=== The first emperor of the Qin dynasty ===
The first emperor of the Qin dynasty, Qin Shi Huang, united the Warring States of China through brilliant military strategy and diplomacy to control the greatest territory yet seen in China. It was also under his command that workers joined pre-existing sections of wall to create the Great Wall of China. Even after these accomplishments he is known in history as a failure both as a king and as a seeker of immortality. Qin had the opportunity to meet the Queen Mother of the West and attain greatness from her, but instead wasted it and died without the Mandate of Heaven or a dynasty. His story of not jumping at the chance to meet the Queen Mother serves as a warning to later men, as despite huge and costly efforts to pursue immortality, he died and speaks no more. The 9th century poet Zhuang Nanjie wrote:

His flourishing breath once departed, he never more will speak;

His white bones buried deep, the evening mountains turn cyan.

=== Emperor Wu of the Han dynasty ===
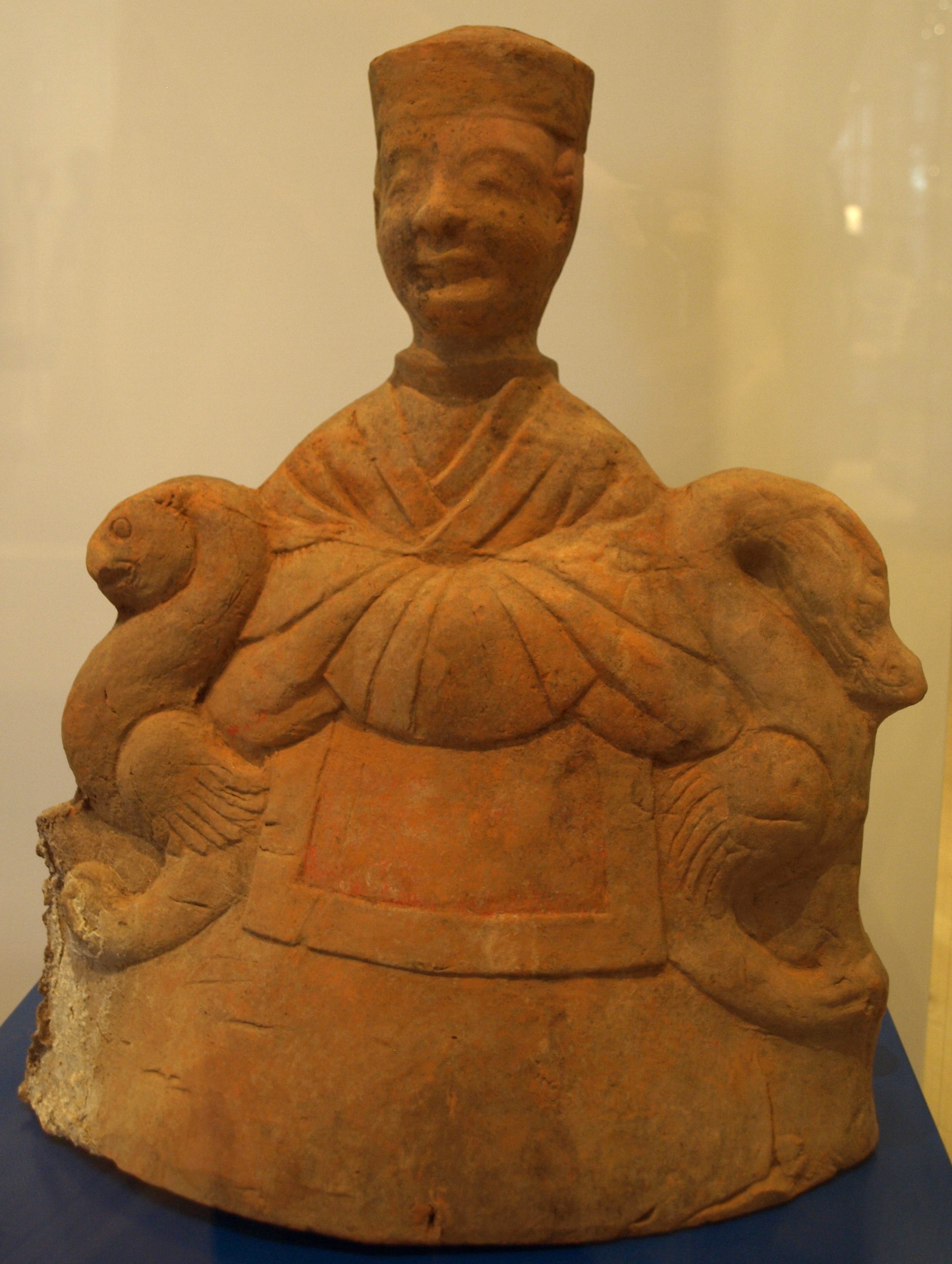
Queen Mother of the West, earthenware, 2nd century, Han dynasty

According to legend, Emperor Wu of the Han dynasty and the Queen Mother of the West met during the height of Wu's reign, when she visited him during the night of Double Seven, the night for encounters between mortal men and divine women. When the Queen Mother of the West visits Emperor Wu she shares a banquet with him, grants him special teachings, and then departs. Emperor Wu just like King Mu before him fails to follow her teachings, and fails to put them into practice, and therefore he inevitably dies. The whole story of their meeting is described in Li Qi's long work "Songs of the Queen Mother":

The Martial Illustrious One fasted and observed abstinence in his Basilica for Receiving Florescence;
As he stood upright with folded hands, instantly the Queen Mother came to grant him an audience.
Rainbow standards numinously flashing: her qilin-drawn chariots,
With feathered parasols streaming and pheasant fans.
Her fingers holding intertwined pears, she sent them along for the emperor to eat;
By means of them one can prolong life and preside over the cosmos.
On top of her head she wore the nine-starred crown;
She led a flock of jade lads, then sat facing south.
"Do you want to hear my essential words? Now I'll report them to you."
The emperor thereupon burned incense and requested such a discussion.
"If you can rarefy your earth soul and dispatch the three corpses,
Afterward you will certainly have an audience with me at the Celestial Illustrious One's palace."
Turning her head back, she told the servant girl, Dong Shuangcheng,
"The wind is finished; you may perform on the Cloud Harmony Mouth Organ."
Red auroral clouds and the white sun, in strict attendance, did not move;
Seven dragons and five phoenixes in variegated disarray greeted them.
How regrettable! He was too ambitious and arrogant; the divinities were not satisfied,
But sighed and lamented over his horses' hooves and chariots' wheel tracks.
In his covered walkways, song bells became hard to discern in the approaching evening;
In the deep palace, peach and plum flowers turned snowy.
Now I just look at my blue jade five-branched lamp;
Its coiled dragon spits fire as the light is about to be severed.

== In popular culture ==
- Lake Heihai in the Kunlun Mountains has been associated with the Jade Pond of the Queen Mother of the West and a temple has been erected in her honor on its shore.
- Si Wang-mu, named after the goddess, is a character in Orson Scott Card's Xenocide and Children of the Mind.
- Xiwangmu is a character in Carrie Vaughn's Kitty's Big Trouble.
- Xiwangmu appears in several of the Shin Megami Tensei games. Her latest appearance was in Shin Megami Tensei IV.
- Xiwangmu is the name of a city on the planet T'ien Shan based on oriental religions in the book The Rise of Endymion by Dan Simmons, part of the Hyperion Cantos series. The planet is mountainous and therefore likely named after Tian Shan.
- Xiwangmu appears as one of the heroes of Emperor: Rise of the Middle Kingdom: in the game, she boosts monument construction and can capture animals on the map.
- Part Four of Amy Tan's The Joy Luck Club is titled "Queen Mother of the Western Skies". In its prologue, a grandmother addresses her infant granddaughter, teasingly suggesting the child is the reincarnation of the Queen Mother of the West, come to share the secret of eternal happiness.
- In 2004 Hong Kong drama TV series My Date with a Vampire III, Yaochi Shengmu is one of the antagonists from the Pangu clan.
- In The League of Extraordinary Gentlemen: Black Dossier, Orlando was an intimate acquaintance of hers, she was later usurped by a reincarnate of Ayesha.

== See also ==
- Dongwanggong "King Father of the East" – her male counterpart
- Bixia
- Doumu
- Houtu
- Huxian
- Jiutian Xuannü, goddess of war, sex, and longevity as well as disciple of Xiwangmu
- Kunlun Mountain (mythology)
- Qingniao
- Sungmo
- Xian or Immortal
- Yaochidao
- Yumjao Leima, queen mother goddess
