= Shengdao =

New religious movement originating in China

圣道 Shèngdào 同善社 Tóngshànshè
- Classification: Confucian folk religious sect
- Founder: Peng Tairong the Ruzun
- Origin: early 20th century Sichuan
- Members: 1929: 30 million
- Official website: http://tongshanshe.com/

Shengdao (圣道 "Holy Way" or "Way of the Hallows"), best known by its corporate name Tongshanshe (Chinese: 同善社; pinyin: Tóngshàn Shè; Wade–Giles: T'ung-shan She; lit. 'Society of the Goodness') is a Confucian salvation sect part of the Xiantiandao ("Way of Former Heaven") lineage.

Amongst the Way of Former Heaven sects, the Tongshanshe has been one of the most widespread and influential. Yanshengdao (言圣道 "Way of the Holy Word") is a branch of Shengdao.

== History ==
It was founded at the start of the 20th century by Peng Tairong (1873–1950), styled Ruzun, in Sichuan. The sect attracted the local gentry and in 1910 it was introduced to the Qing court. In 1917 the Tongshanshe was established in Beijing with the sponsorship of Duan Qirui (1865–1936) and general Cao Kun (1862–1938), later to become president of the Republic of China in 1923–24.

The Ministry of the Interior supported the establishment of a Tongshanshe branch in every province, municipality and county of China. By the early 1920s, Shengdao had a national membership of over 1 million. In 1920 a second administrative centre, the "Unity Church" (合一会 Héyī Huì) was established in Hankou, which was to relieve the Beijing headquarters of some of its responsibilities.

Tongshanshe's close alliance with reactionary political circles caused it to be viewed with some disfavour by the later republican government, and in 1927 it was proscribed. This only fitfully enforced prohibition did not lead to the sect's immediate demise, but it did put a stop to its previous phase of rapid expansion. It was effectively suppressed only after the communist rise to power in 1949. Today, Shengdao "halls of enlightenment" (佛堂 fótáng) remain operational in Taiwan, Hong Kong and Southeast Asia. Shengdao is still proscribed in the People's Republic of China, but nonetheless it is active as an underground church.

=== Post-1949, Taiwanese and Southeast Asian developments ===
After the loss of its mainland headquarters, there currently appears to be no central governing body that would embrace all Shengdao local churches. However, the situation is far from clear, as no extended study has been made of the sect's present state of affairs. There do seem to exist regional hierarchies in which one Shengdao church, often the oldest, claims seniority over the others, and acts as a sort of primus inter pares.

For instance, the first Taiwanese enlightenment hall was founded in 1947 and in 1949 it created the "Chinese Confucian Studies Association" (中国孔学会 Zhōngguó Kǒngxué Huì). This earliest hall is designated as the "provincial church" (省会 shěnghuì), while its later offshoots in other parts of Taiwan are called "branch bodies" (分社 fēnshè). The picture is complicated by a schism that occurred in the Taiwanese section of the sect in 1978, leading to the establishment of a competing organization, the "National Association of Godly Cultivation" (国民修神协会 Guómín Xiūshén Xiéhuì).

In Singapore is based the "Southeast Asian General Church of Shengism" (南洋圣教总会 Nányáng Shèngjiào Zǒnghuì), which is the head of the Shengdao local churches in Singapore and Malaysia.

== Praxis ==
Rituals, sitting meditation, and inner alchemy directly based on orthodox Taoist neidan are part of Shengdao practice and were widely disseminated among the general population in the 1920s. The Shengdao press house in Beijing, the Tianhuaguan, published self-cultivation and morality books. The Tongshanshe engaged in charitable work and ran schools of traditional learning (guoxue) and foreign languages courses.

== See also ==
- Chinese folk religion
- Chinese salvationist religions
- Confucian church
- Xiantiandao

== Sources ==
- Goossaert, Vincent; David Palmer (2011). The Religious Question in Modern China. University of Chicago Press. ISBN 978-0226005331.
- Munro, Robin; Mickey Spiegel (1994). Detained in China and Tibet: A Directory of Political and Religious Prisoners. Human Rights Watch. ISBN 978-1564321053.
  - List first published in: "Appendix: Sects and Societies Recently or Currently Active in the PRC". Chinese Sociology & Anthropology. 21 (4): 103–104. 1989. doi:10.2753/CSA0009-46252104102.
- Ownby, David (2008). "Sect and Secularism in Reading the Modern Chinese Religious Experience". Archives de sciences sociales des religions. 144 (144). doi:10.4000/assr.17633.
